= Deng Chuna =

Deng Chuna (Chinese: 鄧處訥; died 894), courtesy name Chongyun (沖韞), was a warlord in the late Tang dynasty China, who controlled Wu'an Circuit (武安, headquartered in modern Changsha, Hunan) as its military governor (Jiedushi) from 893 to 894, when he was defeated and killed by Liu Jianfeng, who took over the circuit.

== Background and service under Min Xu ==
It is not known when Deng Chuna was born, but it is known that he was from Shao Prefecture (邵州, in modern Shaoyang, Hunan). In his youth, he became a soldier under Min Xu, an officer from Jiangxi Circuit (江西, headquartered in modern Nanchang, Jiangxi), on a deployment to Annan (安南, i.e., modern northern Vietnam). In 881, when Min and his soldiers were returning from Annan, they went through Tan Prefecture (in modern Changsha, Hunan), and Min expelled the governor of Hunan Circuit (湖南, headquartered at Tan Prefecture) and took over the circuit. Min thereafter claimed the title of acting governor and made Deng the prefect of Shao Prefecture.

== Takeover of Wu'an ==
In 886, when Tan Prefecture was under attack by Zhou Yue the prefect of Heng Prefecture (衡州, in modern Hengyang, Hunan), Min Xu welcomed one Huang Hao (黃皓), an officer under Qin Zongquan, who had declared himself emperor of a new state centered around Cai Prefecture (蔡州, in modern Zhumadian, Henan), to help him defend against Zhou's attack. Once inside the city walls of Tan Prefecture, however, Huang assassinated Min. Zhou subsequently defeated and killed Huang, and took over the circuit (which had been renamed Qinhua Circuit by that point), eventually being commissioned as its military governor (Jiedushi).

Hearing of Min's death and blaming Zhou for it, Deng Chuna mourned Min bitterly, and stated to his officers:

I, along with you, gentlemen, have benefited from the great grace of the Puye [(僕射, i.e., Min)]. Zhou You killed him for no reason. I would like to, with you, gentlemen, expend our prefecture's strength to avenge the Puye. Can we not do it?

The officers agreed with him. He trained his forces for seven years, and, in 893, in alliance with Lei Man the prefect of Lang Prefecture (朗州, in modern Changde, Hunan), attacked Tan Prefecture. He captured it and executed Zhou, claiming for himself the title of acting military governor of Wu'an Circuit (as Qinhua had been renamed Wu'an by that point). In spring 894, then-reigning Emperor Zhaozong commissioned him full military governor.

== Defeat and Death ==
However, later that year, an army commanded by Liu Jianfeng and Ma Yin approached Wu'an. Deng sent his officers Jiang Xun (蔣勛) and Deng Jichong (鄧繼崇) with the Shao Prefecture troops to resist the attack at Longhui Pass (龍回關, in modern Shaoyang). Ma persuaded Jiang and Deng Jichong that Liu's success was prophesied and irresistible, and they disbanded their army. Ma took over the uniforms they wore and headed directly for Tan Prefecture. The Tan Prefecture defense forces, believing that these were soldiers from Shao Prefecture, took no precautions. Ma marched directly into the city and the circuit headquarters, capturing Deng Chuna, who was holding a feast, and executed him, allowing Liu to take over the circuit.

== Notes and references ==
- New Book of Tang, vol. 186.
- Zizhi Tongjian, vol. 259.
