= Zhou Yue =

Zhou Yue (周岳) (died 893), courtesy name Junzhao (峻昭), was a warlord late in the Chinese dynasty Tang dynasty, who controlled Wu'an Circuit (武安, headquartered in modern Changsha, Hunan) from 886 to 893.

== Background and takeover of Heng Prefecture ==
It is not known when Zhou Yue was born, and not much is known about his background, as there was no biography for him in either of the official histories of the Tang dynasty (the Old Book of Tang and the New Book of Tang). It is known that he was from Zouxi (陬溪, in modern Changde, Hunan), and likely of non-Han extraction, for he was an associate of the non-Han Lei Man and hunted with Lei. On one occasion when they hunted together, they fought over the distribution of the meat, and he tried to kill Lei but could not.

In 881, Lei gathered a group of men and attacked and captured Lang Prefecture (朗州, in modern Changde), which Zouxi belonged to. Zhou, hearing this news, gathered a group of men as well and attacked Heng Prefecture (modern Hengyang in Hunan), expelling the prefect Xu Hao (徐顥). Then-reigning Emperor Xizong, then facing the major rebellion of the agrarian rebel Huang Chao, commissioned Zhou as the prefect of Heng.

== Takeover of Wu'an Circuit ==
In 886, Zhou Yue attacked Tan Prefecture (in modern Changsha), which was then the capital of Qinhua Circuit. The military governor (jiedushi) of Qinhua, Min Xu, invited Huang Hao (黃皓), a general of the warlord Qin Zongquan, who had claimed imperial title at Cai Prefecture (蔡州, in modern Zhumadian, Henan), into Tan Prefecture to help him defend it. Instead, Huang killed Min and took over Tan Prefecture. Zhou then arrived, defeated Huang, and executed him, taking over Tan Prefecture. Emperor Xizong then commissioned Zhou as military governor and changed the name of the circuit from Qinhua to Wu'an. In 891, Emperor Xizong's brother and successor Emperor Zhaozong commissioned Zhou to be the military governor of Lingnan West Circuit (嶺南西道, headquartered in modern Nanning, Guangxi). (It is not clear whether the commission was intended to give Zhou an extra circuit, or for him to transfer to Lingnan West; in any case, it appeared that Zhou never actually went to Lingnan West.)

== Death ==
Zhou Yue's rule of Wu'an Circuit was not uncontested, however. Deng Chune the prefect of Shao Prefecture (邵州, in modern Shaoyang, Hunan) had long claimed that Zhou was responsible for Min Xu's death and called for his soldiers to follow him in avenging Min's death. In 893, Deng allied with Lei, and they attacked Tan Prefecture together. They captured it and killed Zhou. Deng then took over as acting military governor.
