= Alex Fontana =

Swiss racing driver (born 1992)

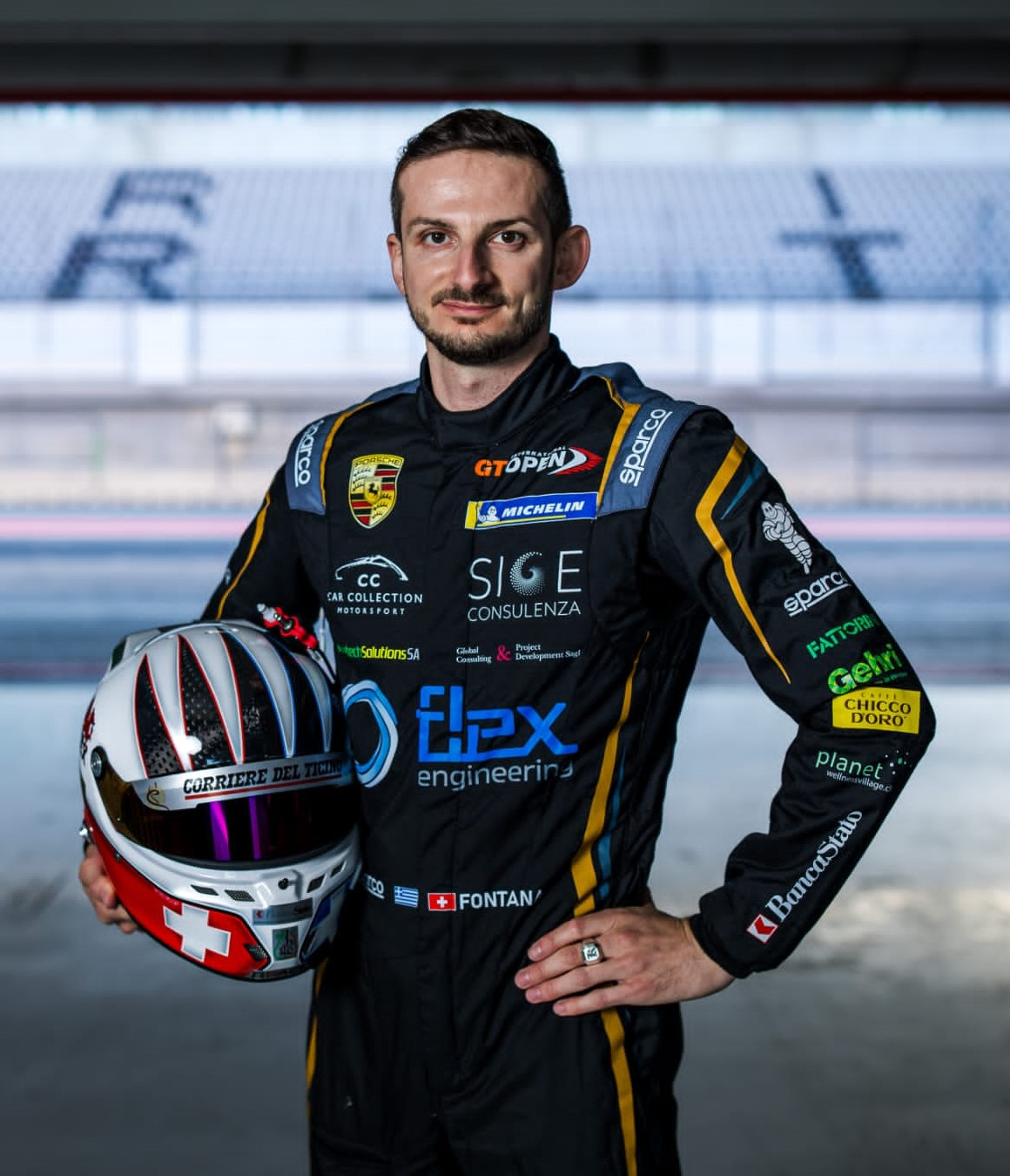
- Nationality: (Switzerland) Swiss (Greece) Greek
- Born: Alex Renato Ioannis Fontana; 5 August 1992 (age 34) Lugano, Switzerland

2025 International GT Open career
- Current team: Car Collection Motorsport
- Categorisation: FIA Silver (until 2018, 2020–2021); FIA Gold (2019, 2022–)
- Former teams: Centri Porsche Ticino, Emil Frey Racing, Dongfeng Yueda Kia Racing Team, Adrenaline Motorsport, Akka ASP Team, Zun Motorsport Crew, Phantom Pro Racing

Previous series
- GT4 European Series, GT World Challenge Europe, China Touring Car Championship, VLN, China GT Championship

Championship titles
- 2023 GT World Challenge Pro-Am Cup; 2021 GT World Challenge Silver Cup; 2019 China GT Championship GT4; 2018 Blancpain Endurance Silver Cup; 2011 European F3 Open Championship

Alex Renato Ioannis Fontana (born 5 August 1992) is a Greek-Swiss professional racing driver competing in GT World Challenge Europe for Lionspeed GP and the International GT Open for ZRS Motorsport. A freelancer, he regularly switches between different teams and manufacturers, and is a three-time GT World Challenge Europe Endurance Cup class champion. He won the European F3 Open Championship in 2011.

When not racing, Fontana works as a coach and driving instructor in Europe, America, and China, while commentating the Formula 1 Grands Prix for Swiss television RSI.

== Career ==
=== Karting ===
Fontana's passion for racing began in 1996 when he was three and a half years old in the Greek island of Rhodes, driving his first baby Puffo Kart. Until 2008, he raced in the Swiss National Championships and international events as a factory driver for Swiss Hutless and PCR International. Highlights include the Swiss Karting Championship 2007 KF3 title, the 2006 Biland 4 Stroke World Final win in Dubai, the Bridgestone Cup 2008 KF2 title win, and the Italian Open Master 2008 Runner Up, as well as qualifying for the World Karting Championship 2008 in La Conca, Italy.

=== Single seaters ===
2009 came the switch to single-seaters after making it into the BMW Talent Scout event at Valencia in 2008. That year, Fontana raced in Formula Azzurra with MG Motorsport taking two wins and one additional podium. In 2010, there was the switch to Formula 3 with Corbetta Competizioni in the Italian Championship, before moving up in 2011 with the same team in the European Formula 3 Open. 2011 was a successful year for Fontana with two wins and nine podiums, allowing him to take the overall championship title. At the end of the year, he had the opportunity to test the Mercedes DTM for the HWA Team.

In August 2011, Fontana made his debut in the Formula One–supporting GP3 Series, replacing Vittorio Ghirelli at Jenzer Motorsport for the penultimate round of the season at Spa–Francorchamps. After finishing 14th in the first race, he took the final championship point in race two by finishing in sixth place.

In 2012, Fontana joined the FIA Formula 2 Championship with three podiums and a win, being selected at the end of the year by Lotus F1 Junior Team, thanks also to other points finish in GP3 Series in fourth place, again as a wild card entry and again with Jenzer Motorsport.

2013 was Fontana's first season with Lotus F1 Junior Team and his first full season with Jenzer Motorsport in the GP3 Series. He finished 17th in the standings with one podium finish. He also had his first Formula 1 test with Lotus F1 Team on 30 September at Circuit Paul Ricard.

In 2014, Fontana continued with Lotus F1 Junior Team in GP3 Series but switched to ART Grand Prix. He finished on the podium twice, but with only four races in the points out of eighteen, he finished 11th in the championship. At the end of the year, he joined the World Series 3.5 by Renault's official test in Jerez with Lotus Charouz signing the second best lap time.

2015 was a bit of a special year. Lotus was sold to Renault and this caused the exit from the Junior Program. Fontana raced again in GP3 Series with Status GP, with the Canadian team having some difficulties throughout the year and eventually exit the series. In the same year came the call from Pons Racing to replace Roberto Merhi in Monte Carlo, where he raced with Marussia F1. The first race in World Series 3.5 by Renault, the first race in the streets of Monaco, finished in the points with ninth place. At the end of the year, he was called by Jarno Trulli to compete in the FIA Formula E Championship last double-round of London Battersea Park, and with the best result in ninth place in the second qualifying. After that, the last single-seater experience to date was the official GP2 Series test in Abu Dhabi, with Status GP and Rapax Team, with the highest result of eighth in the standings.

=== GT and touring cars ===
In 2016, Fontana switched GT cars, joining McLaren GT Academy for a Blancpain GT Endurance campaign and 24 Hours of Spa in PRO class. At the end of the year, it was called by KIA Motors to develop the new Super Production car for China Touring Car Championship, collecting a podium and a pole position in the debut weekends.

2017 was again in Blancpain GT Endurance and 24 Hours of Spa but in PRO-AM, with the Mercedes AMG supported car of AKKA ASP and his Chupa-Chups livery. A highlight of the year is the overall best lap time in the two days of official testing in Paul Ricard on a field of 55 cars. He was signed by KIA Motors for the maximum number of rounds a foreign driver could complete, four, taking two pole positions, two wins, and one more podium.

In 2018, Fontana raced for Emil Frey Jaguar Racing winning the Blancpain GT Series Endurance Cup - Silver Cup and also placing the car in the top-five in the overall standings two times out of five. In China, he was confirmed for the third year by KIA Motors in China Touring Car Championship. As a foreign driver, he disputed the four mandatory races on eight where, thanks to two victories, he allowed Kia to win the constructors' championship. He also took part in two VLN races to achieve the Permit A for the Nordschleife.

2019 was opened by taking part in the first round of the VLN with the official Nissan KCMG team at the "65. ADAC Westfalenfahrt". In this year, Fontana was chosen as a driver for the official AMG team - Phantom Pro Racing in the China GT Championship, GT4 class, where, after an intense championship, he managed to win the title. He also raced for the fourth year in a row as an official Kia motors driver for Dongfeng Yueda Kia Racing Team in the China touring car championship for the maximum number of races allowed for a foreign driver. Thanks to his 84 points, the Dongfeng Yueda Kia Racing Team won the manufacturers' title for the second year in a row. Lastly, he has been involved in other motorsports competitions during the year including the China Endurance Championship as a driver for Lamborghini in GT3 class and as a coach for Volkswagen in TCR class. 2019 also saw Fontana engaged in collaborations with the Swiss television RSI for the events of Formula 1 and other motorsport shows. In recognition for this year, Fontana was awarded by the Swiss Automobile Club an award for sports merit and a trophy in memory of Loris Kessel.

In 2020, Fontana was meant to join three different competitions in Asia, as well as a comeback in the European competitions. However, due to the COVID-19 pandemic, many competitions were canceled, and Fontana didn't take part in any of the competitions in Asia.

Fontana was confirmed to race with Adderly Fong in the Silver-Pro class of the GT World Challenge Asia behind the wheel of a Mercedes-AMG GT3 of the Zun Motorsport Crew. He, also, was still in contract to continue to race in the China GT Championship, that year in two classes: in a Mercedes-AMG GT3 in the GT3 class with Chris Chia and the Phantom Pro Racing Team, and, after the success of 2019, in the Mercedes-AMG GT4 in GT4 class.

Furthermore, after a long stop of the activities, Fontana was called to compete in the GT World Challenge Europe Endurance Cup 2020, driving the new Mercedes-AMG GT3 EVO of the AKKA ASP Team. The year was concluded with 11th place in the Endurance Cup.

In 2021, Fontana competed again in Europe behind the wheel of the consolidated Emil Frey's Lamborghini Huracán GT3 Evo. This comeback was announced three years after his success in the Endurance Silver Cup with the Swiss Team. Fontana won the 2021 championship title in the Endurance Silver Cup, with his teammates Rolf Ineichen and Ricardo Feller, and he was the sole champion of the Sprint Silver Cup. At the end of the season, he was the unique winner of the combined Silver Championship title, with a gap of 28 points on the second placed, his teammate Ricardo Feller. Even if he was racing in the Silver category, Fontana also finished the year in fifth place overall among Pro drivers in the Sprint Championship. In addition, the endurance team was the protagonist of a record in this competition during the debut race in Monza, managing to become the first Silver cup team to finish the race on the overall podium, other than winning in their category.

In June 2021, Fontana had taken part in his first 24 hours of Nürburgring, racing in the main class with the Konrad Motorsport's Lamborghini Huracán GT3 Evo.

Fontana returned to the Fanatec GT World Challenge Europe in 2023 after a year away, competing for his 2022 GT4 European Series employers Centri Porsche Ticino alongside Ivan Jacoma and Nicolas Leutwiler. With the new German team "Car Collection Motorsport", the line-up won the class title in the Endurance Cup with one race to spare, adding another championship to Fontana's palmarès.

== Racing record ==
=== Career summary ===
Season	Series	Team	Races	Wins	Poles	F/laps	Podiums	Points	Position
2009	Formula Azzurra	MG Motorsport	16	2	0	0	3	49	7th
2010	Italian Formula 3 Championship	Corbetta Competizioni	16	0	0	0	0	0	27th
2011	European F3 Open	Corbetta Competizioni	16	2	1	1	7	120	**1st**
2011	GP3 Series	Jenzer Motorsport	2	0	0	0	0	1	24th
2012	FIA Formula Two Championship	Motorsport Vision	16	1	0	1	3	115	7th
2012	GP3 Series	Jenzer Motorsport	4	0	0	0	0	8.5	18th
2013	GP3 Series	Jenzer Motorsport	16	0	0	0	1	18	17th
2014	GP3 Series	ART Grand Prix	18	0	0	1	2	43	11th
2014–15	Formula E	Trulli GP	2	0	0	0	0	0	33rd
2015	GP3 Series	Status Grand Prix	18	0	0	0	0	16	16th
2015	Formula Renault 3.5 Series	Pons Racing	1	0	0	0	0	2	24th
2016	Blancpain GT Series Endurance Cup	Garage 59	5	0	0	0	0	0	NC
2016	Intercontinental GT Challenge	Garage 59	1	0	0	0	0	0	NC
2016	China Touring Car Championship	Dongfeng Yueda Kia Racing Team	4	0	1	0	1	21	22nd
2017	China Touring Car Championship	Dongfeng Yueda Kia Racing Team	8	2	2	0	3	85	10th
2017	Intercontinental GT Challenge	AKKA ASP	1	0	0	0	0	0	NC
2017	Blancpain GT Series Endurance Cup - Pro-Am	AKKA ASP	4	0	0	0	0	2	47th
2017	Blancpain GT Series Endurance Cup	AKKA ASP	4	0	0	0	0	0	NC
2017	Blancpain GT Series Endurance Cup	Emil Frey Racing	1	0	0	0	0	0	NC
2018	China Touring Car Championship	Dongfeng Yueda Kia Racing Team	6	2	0	0	3	70.5	11th
2018	Blancpain GT Series Endurance Cup	Emil Frey Racing	5	0	0	0	0	22	21st
2018	Blancpain GT Series Endurance Cup - Silver Cup	Emil Frey Racing	5	2	4	3	3	103	**1st**
2018	Blancpain GT Series Sprint Cup	Emil Frey Racing	2	0	0	0	0	3	23rd
2018	Blancpain GT Series Sprint Cup - Silver Cup	Emil Frey Racing	2	0	0	0	2	21.5	11th
2018	European Le Mans Series - LMP3	Racing For Poland	1	0	0	0	0	0.5	36th
2018	V de V Endurance Series - LMP3	Team Virage	1	0	0	0	0	0	NC
2019	China Touring Car Championship	Dongfeng Yueda Kia Racing Team	8	1	0	0	3	84	9th
2019	China GT Championship - GT4	PhantomPro Racing	12	4	0	0	6	178.5	**1st**
2020	GT World Challenge Europe Endurance Cup	AKKA ASP	4	0	0	0	0	0	NC
2020	GT World Challenge Europe Endurance Cup - Silver Cup	AKKA ASP	4	0	1	1	0	32	11th
2020	Intercontinental GT Challenge	AKKA ASP	1	0	0	0	0	0	NC
2020	European Le Mans Series - LMP3	BHK Motorsport	1	0	0	0	0	4	28th
2021	GT World Challenge Europe - Silver Cup	Emil Frey Racing	15	5	6	1	8	194	**1st**
2021	GT World Challenge Europe Endurance Cup - Silver Cup	Emil Frey Racing	5	2	2	1	3	91	**1st**
2021	GT World Challenge Europe Sprint Cup	Emil Frey Racing	10	1	1	0	2	45	5th
2021	GT World Challenge Europe Sprint Cup - Silver Cup	Emil Frey Racing	10	3	4	0	5	103	**1st**
2021	Intercontinental GT Challenge	Emil Frey Racing	1	0	0	0	0	0	NC
2021	24 Hours of Nürburgring - SP9	Konrad Motorsport	1	0	0	0	0	N/A	17th
2022	GT4 European Series - Pro-Am	Centri Porsche Ticino	12	1	1	0	5	139	4th
2023	GT World Challenge Europe Endurance Cup	Car Collection Motorsport	5	0	0	0	0	0	NC
2023	GT World Challenge Europe Endurance Cup - Pro-Am Cup	Car Collection Motorsport	5	1	0	1	3	102	**1st**
2023	Intercontinental GT Challenge - Pro-Am	Car Collection Motorsport	0	0	0	0	0	0	NC
2023	24H GT Series - GT3	Car Collection Motorsport	0	0	0	0	0	0	NC
2023	GT4 European Series - Pro-Am	Centri Porsche Ticino	3	0	0	0	0	5	25th
2024	International GT Open	Car Collection Motorsport	14	0	0	0	0	4	29th
2024	24H Series - GT3	Car Collection Motorsport	2	0	0	0	0	0	NC
2024	Nürburgring Langstrecken-Serie - SP9	Car Collection Motorsport	1	0	0	0	0	0	NC
2024	GT World Challenge America - Pro-Am	Car Collection Motorsport	1	0	0	0	0	0	NC
2024	GT World Challenge Australia - Pro-Am	Car Collection Motorsport	2	0	0	0	0	2	15th
2024	Italian GT Endurance Championship - GT Cup Am Division 2	Centri Porsche Ticino	4	2	1	2	4	84	**2nd**
2024	GT World Challenge Europe Endurance Cup	Kessel Racing	1	0	0	0	0	0	NC
2024–25	Asian Le Mans Series - GT	Car Collection Motorsport	4	0	0	0	0	0	31st
2025	Middle East Trophy - GT3	Car Collection Motorsport							
2025	Nürburgring Langstrecken-Serie - SP9	Car Collection Motorsport							
2025	International GT Open	Car Collection Motorsport	9	0	1	1	0	12	20th
2025	International GT Open	Tsunami RT	1	0	0	0	0	12	20th
2025–26	24H Series Middle East - GT3	Tsunami RT							
2026	Nürburgring Langstrecken-Serie - SP9	Goroyan RT by Car Collection							
2026	24 Hours of Nürburgring - SP9 Pro-Am	Goroyan RT by Car Collection	1	0	0	0	0	N/A	5th
2026	GT World Challenge Europe Endurance Cup	Lionspeed GP	5	0	0	0	0	0	NC
2026	GT World Challenge Europe Endurance Cup - Bronze	Lionspeed GP	5	0	0	0	1	13th	31
2026	International GT Open	ZRS Motorsport	13	3	2	1	9	136	4th
2026	GT4 Italian Series - Pro-Am	Centri Porsche Ticino	6	0	3	2	1	39	10th
2026	GT World Challenge America - Pro-Am	Tsunami RT	1	0	0	0	0	0	NC†
2026	Intercontinental GT Challenge	Tsunami RT; Goroyan RT by Car Collection; Lionspeed GP	4	0	0	0	0	0	NC

^{*} Season still in progress.

=== Complete GP3 Series results ===
(key) (Races in bold indicate pole position) (Races in italics indicate fastest lap)

Year	Entrant	1	2	3	4	5	6	7	8	9	10	11	12	13	14	15	16	17	18	DC	Points
2011	Jenzer Motorsport	IST; FEA	IST; SPR	CAT; FEA	CAT; SPR	VAL; FEA	VAL; SPR	SIL; FEA	SIL; SPR	NÜR; FEA	NÜR; SPR	HUN; FEA	HUN; SPR	SPA; FEA; 14	SPA; SPR; 6	MNZ; FEA	MNZ; SPR			24th	1
2012	Jenzer Motorsport	CAT; FEA	CAT; SPR	MON; FEA	MON; SPR	VAL; FEA	VAL; SPR	SIL; FEA	SIL; SPR	HOC; FEA	HOC; SPR	HUN; FEA; 17	HUN; SPR; 15	SPA; FEA; 10^{‡}	SPA; SPR; 4	MNZ; FEA	MNZ; SPR			18th	8.5
2013	Jenzer Motorsport	CAT; FEA; 10	CAT; SPR; 9	VAL; FEA; 14	VAL; SPR; 11	SIL; FEA; 7	SIL; SPR; 3	NÜR; FEA; Ret	NÜR; SPR; 17	HUN; FEA; 10	HUN; SPR; 19	SPA; FEA; 21	SPA; SPR; 12	MNZ; FEA; Ret	MNZ; SPR; Ret	YMC; FEA; 13	YMC; SPR; 10			17th	18
2014	ART Grand Prix	CAT; FEA; 11	CAT; SPR; 19	RBR; FEA; Ret	RBR; SPR; 17	SIL; FEA; 15	SIL; SPR; Ret	HOC; FEA; 11	HOC; SPR; 13	HUN; FEA; 14	HUN; SPR; 13	SPA; FEA; 6	SPA; SPR; 3	MNZ; FEA; Ret	MNZ; SPR; 10	SOC; FEA; 3	SOC; SPR; Ret	YMC; FEA; 6	YMC; SPR; 15	11th	43
2015	Status Grand Prix	CAT; FEA; 9	CAT; SPR; 16	RBR; FEA; 10	RBR; SPR; 6	SIL; FEA; 19	SIL; SPR; 18	HUN; FEA; 14	HUN; SPR; 13	SPA; FEA; 10	SPA; SPR; 6	MNZ; FEA; 8	MNZ; SPR; 16	SOC; FEA; 19	SOC; SPR; 11	BHR; FEA; 19	BHR; SPR; 19	YMC; FEA; 15	YMC; SPR; 13	16th	16

^{‡} Half points awarded as less than 75% of race distance was completed.

=== Complete FIA Formula Two Championship results ===
(key) (Races in bold indicate pole position) (Races in italics indicate fastest lap)

Year	1	2	3	4	5	6	7	8	9	10	11	12	13	14	15	16	Pos	Points
2012	SIL; 1; 3	SIL; 2; 3	ALG; 1; 7	ALG; 2; 10	NÜR; 1; 6	NÜR; 2; 5	SPA; 1; 8	SPA; 2; 5	BRH; 1 Ret	BRH; 2; 7	LEC; 1; 14	LEC; 2 Ret	HUN; 1; 1	HUN; 2; 5	MNZ; 1; 9	MNZ; 2; 6	7th	115

=== Complete Formula Renault 3.5 Series results ===
(key) (Races in bold indicate pole position; races in italics indicate fastest lap)

Year	Team	1	2	3	4	5	6	7	8	9	10	11	12	13	14	15	16	17	Pos	Points
2015	Pons Racing	ALC; 1	ALC; 2	MON; 1; 9	SPA; 1	SPA; 2	HUN; 1	HUN; 2	RBR; 1	RBR; 2	SIL; 1	SIL; 2	NÜR; 1	NÜR; 2	BUG; 1	BUG; 2	JER; 1	JER; 2	24th	2

=== Complete Formula E results ===
(key) (Races in bold indicate pole position; races in italics indicate fastest lap)

Year	Team	Chassis	Powertrain	1	2	3	4	5	6	7	8	9	10	11	Pos	Points
2014–15	Trulli Formula E Team	Spark SRT01-e	SRT01-e	BEI	PUT	PDE	BUE	MIA	LBH	MCO	BER	MSC	LDN; Ret	LDN; 14	33rd	0

=== Complete GT World Challenge Europe results ===
==== GT World Challenge Europe Endurance Cup ====
Year	Team	Car	Class	1	2	3	4	5	6	7	Pos	Points
2016	Garage 59	McLaren 650S GT3	Pro	MNZ; 36	SIL; 22	LEC; 14	SPA; 6H; 18	SPA; 12H; 61	SPA; 24H; Ret	NÜR; Ret	NC	0
2017	AKKA ASP	Mercedes-AMG GT3	Pro-Am	MNZ; Ret	SIL; 32	LEC; Ret	SPA; 6H; 56	SPA; 12H; 50	SPA; 24H; Ret		47th	2
2017	Emil Frey Jaguar Racing	Jaguar XK Emil Frey GT3	Pro							CAT; 11	NC	0
2018	Emil Frey Jaguar Racing	Jaguar XK Emil Frey GT3	Silver	**MNZ**; 5	**SIL**; 44	**LEC**; 16	SPA; 6H; 29	SPA; 12H; 35	**SPA**; **24H**; 28	CAT; 4	1st	103
2020	AKKA ASP Team	Mercedes-AMG GT3	Silver	IMO; 38	NÜR; 38	SPA; 6H; 27	SPA; 12H; 39	**SPA**; **24H**; 29	LEC; 21		11th	32
2021	Emil Frey Racing	Lamborghini Huracán GT3	Silver	MNZ; 3	LEC; 13	SPA; 6H; 14	SPA; 12H; 38	**SPA**; **24H**; 31	NÜR; 8	CAT; 20	1st	91
2023	Car Collection Motorsport	Porsche 911 GT3 R (992)	Pro-Am	MNZ; Ret	LEC; 31	SPA; 6H; 35	SPA; 12H; 36	SPA; 24H; 23	NÜR; 42	CAT; 41	1st	102
2024	Kessel Racing	Ferrari 296 GT3	Bronze	LEC	SPA; 6H	SPA; 12H	SPA; 24H	NÜR	MNZ; Ret	JED	NC	0
2026	Lionspeed GP	Porsche 911 GT3 R (992.2)	Bronze	LEC; Ret	MNZ; 21	SPA; 6H; 41	SPA; 12H; 27	SPA; 24H; 20	NÜR; 44	ALG; 46	13th	31

==== GT World Challenge Europe Sprint Cup ====
Year	Team	Car	Class	1	2	3	4	5	6	7	8	9	10	Pos	Points
2018	Emil Frey Racing	Jaguar XK Emil Frey G3	Silver	ZOL; 1	ZOL; 2	BRH; 1	BRH; 2	MIS; 1; 7	MIS; 2; 11	HUN; 1	HUN; 2	NÜR; 1	NÜR; 2	11th	21.5
2021	Emil Frey Racing	Lamborghini Huracán GT3	Silver	MAG; 1; 3	**MAG**; **2**; 8	ZAN; 1; 1	ZAN; 2; 2	MIS; 1; 9	MIS; 2; 11	BRH; 1; 14	BRH; 2; 8	VAL; 1; 18	VAL; 2; 13	1st	103

=== Complete China Touring Car Championship results ===
Year	Team	Car	Class	1	2	3	4	5	6	7	8	9	10	11	12	13	14	15	16	Pos	Points
2017	Dongfeng Yueda Kia Racing Team	Kia K3 2.0T	Super Cup	ZUN; 1	ZUN; 2	**GUA**; **1**; **Ret**	**GUA**; **2**; **10**	GUI; 1	GUI; 2	STC; 1	STC; 2	SHA; 1; 4	SHA; 2; 11	NIN; 1; 12	NIN; 2; 1	WUH; 1	WUH; 2	**SHA**; **1**; **1**	**SHA**; **2**; **3**	10th	85
2018	Dongfeng Yueda Kia Racing Team	Kia K3 2.0T	Super Cup	SHA; 1; 2	SHA; 2 Ret	ZUN; 1	ZUN; 2	GUA; 1	GUA; 2	STC; 1	STC; 2	NIN; 1	NIN; 2	WUH; 1	WUH; 2	STC; 1; 1	STC; 2; 5	SHA; 1; 9	SHA; 2; 1	11th	70.5
2019	Dongfeng Yueda Kia Racing Team	Kia K3 2.0T	Super Cup	GUA; 1; 5	GUA; 2; 3	SHA; 1	SHA; 2	STC; 1	STC; 2	ZUN; 1	ZUN; 2	NIN; 1; 3	NIN; 2; 10	ZHE; 1	ZHE; 2	SHA; 1 Ret	SHA; 2; 5	WUH; 1; 1	WUH; 2; 4	9th	84

=== Complete European Le Mans Series results ===
Year	Entrant	Class	Chassis	Engine	1	2	3	4	5	6	Rank	Points
2018	Racing For Poland	LMP3	Ligier JS P3	Nissan VK50VE 5.0 L V8	LEC	MNZ; 14	RBR	SIL	SPA	ALG	36th	0.5
2020	BHK Motorsport	LMP3	Ligier JS P320	Nissan VK56DE 5.6L V8	LEC	SPA	LEC	MNZ	ALG; 8		28th	4

=== Complete China GT Championship results ===
Year	Team	Car	Class	1	2	3	4	5	6	7	8	9	10	11	12	Pos	Points
2019	PhantomPro Racing	Mercedes-AMG GT4	GT4	SEP; 1; 1	SEP; 2; 3	NIN; 1; 5	NIN; 2; 1	SHA; 1; 11*	SHA; 2; 2	SHO; 1; 4	SHO; 2; 6	TIA; 1; 1	TIA; 2; 6	SHA; 1; 1	SHA; 2; 4	**1st**	178.5

^{*} Half points awarded due to red flag.

=== Complete 24 Hours of Nürburgring results ===
Year	Team	Co-Drivers	Car	Class	Laps	Pos.	Class Pos.
2021	(Austria) Konrad Motorsport	(Zimbabwe) Axcil Jefferies (Germany) Michele Di Martino (Germany) Tim Zimmermann	Lamborghini Huracán GT3	SP9	56	18th	17th

=== Complete GT4 European Series results ===
Year	Team	Car	Class	1	2	3	4	5	6	7	8	9	10	11	12	Pos	Points
2022	Centri Porsche Ticino	Porsche 718 Cayman GT4 RS CS	Pro-Am	IMO; 1; 3	IMO; 2; 1	PRI; 1; 5	PRI; 2; 4	MIS; 1; 5	MIS; 2; 9	SPA; 1; 2	SPA; 2 Ret	HOC; 1; 7	HOC; 2 Ret	CAT; 1; 2	CAT; 2; 2	4th	139

Sporting positions
Preceded by Marco Barba	European F3 Open Championship; Champion; 2011	Succeeded by Niccolò Schirò
Preceded by Inaugural	Blancpain GT Series Endurance Cup - Silver Cup; Champion; 2018; With: Adrian Zaugg & Mikaël Grenier	Succeeded by Nico Bastian; Timur Boguslavskiy; Felipe Fraga
Preceded by Jack Mitchell	China GT Championship - GT4; Champion; 2019; With: Chris Chia	Succeeded by Suspended
Preceded by Ezequiel Pérez Companc	GT World Challenge Europe - Silver Cup; Champion; 2021	Succeeded by Thomas Neubauer, Benjamin Goethe
Preceded by Louis Machiels, Andrea Bertolini, Stefano Costantini	GT World Challenge Europe Endurance Cup - Pro-Am; Champion; 2023; With: Ivan Jacoma & Niki Leutwiler	Succeeded by Incumbent
