= 2018 Blancpain GT Series Endurance Cup =

Sports season

The 2018 Blancpain GT Series Endurance Cup was the eighth season of the Blancpain GT Series Endurance Cup. The season began on 22 April at Monza and ended on 30 September in Barcelona. The season featured five rounds, with each race lasting for a duration of three hours besides the 24 Hours of Spa and the 1000 km Paul Ricard events.

== Calendar ==
At the annual press conference during the 2017 24 Hours of Spa on 28 July, the Stéphane Ratel Organisation announced the first draft of the 2018 calendar. No changes were made to the schedule compared to 2017. On 17 September 2017, it was announced the race at Silverstone was moved a week to avoid a clash with the Nürburgring 24 Hours.

Round	Race	Circuit	Date	Report
1	3 Hours of Monza	Autodromo Nazionale Monza, Monza, Italy	22 April	Report
2	3 Hours of Silverstone	(United Kingdom) Silverstone Circuit, Silverstone, Great Britain	20 May	Report
3	Circuit Paul Ricard 1000km	Circuit Paul Ricard, Le Castellet, France	2 June	Report
4	Total 24 Hours of Spa	Circuit de Spa-Francorchamps, Stavelot, Belgium	28–29 July	Report
5	3 Hours of Barcelona	Circuit de Barcelona-Catalunya, Montmeló, Spain	30 September	Report

== Entry list ==
On 2 October 2017, it was announced grids would be limited to 26 Pro class entries, in an effort to make the championship more attractive to Pro-Am and Am class competitors. The entry cap was in place for all races except for the 24 Hours of Spa.

Team	Car	No.	Drivers	Class	Rounds
(Belgium) / Belgian Audi Club Team WRT (Note: Car No. 1 entered as Belgian Audi Club Team WRT at Rounds 1 to 3 and 5 and as Audi Sport Team WRT at Round 4. Car No. 2 entered as Audi Sport Team WRT. Car No. 17 entered as Belgian Audi Club Team WRT.); (Belgium) / Audi Sport Team WRT	Audi R8 LMS	1	(Germany) Christopher Mies	P	All
(Belgium) / Belgian Audi Club Team WRT; (Belgium) / Audi Sport Team WRT	Audi R8 LMS	1	(Spain) Alex Riberas	P	All
(Belgium) / Belgian Audi Club Team WRT; (Belgium) / Audi Sport Team WRT	Audi R8 LMS	1	(Belgium) Dries Vanthoor	P	All
(Belgium) / Belgian Audi Club Team WRT; (Belgium) / Audi Sport Team WRT	Audi R8 LMS	2	(Netherlands) Robin Frijns	P	4
(Belgium) / Belgian Audi Club Team WRT; (Belgium) / Audi Sport Team WRT	Audi R8 LMS	2	(Switzerland) Nico Müller	P	4
(Belgium) / Belgian Audi Club Team WRT; (Belgium) / Audi Sport Team WRT	Audi R8 LMS	2	(Germany) René Rast	P	4
(Belgium) / Belgian Audi Club Team WRT; (Belgium) / Audi Sport Team WRT	Audi R8 LMS	17	(United Kingdom) Stuart Leonard	P	All
(Belgium) / Belgian Audi Club Team WRT; (Belgium) / Audi Sport Team WRT	Audi R8 LMS	17	(South Africa) Sheldon van der Linde	P	1–3, 5
(Belgium) / Belgian Audi Club Team WRT; (Belgium) / Audi Sport Team WRT	Audi R8 LMS	17	(Netherlands) Robin Frijns	P	1, 5
(Belgium) / Belgian Audi Club Team WRT; (Belgium) / Audi Sport Team WRT	Audi R8 LMS	17	(Switzerland) Marcel Fässler	P	2, 4
(Belgium) / Belgian Audi Club Team WRT; (Belgium) / Audi Sport Team WRT	Audi R8 LMS	17	(Belgium) Frédéric Vervisch	P	3
(Belgium) / Belgian Audi Club Team WRT; (Belgium) / Audi Sport Team WRT	Audi R8 LMS	17	(Brazil) Daniel Serra	P	4
(Germany) / Mercedes-AMG Team Black Falcon (Note: Car No. 4 entered as Mercedes-AMG Team Black Falcon and cars No. 5 and 6 entered as Black Falcon.); (Germany) / Black Falcon	Mercedes-AMG GT3	4	(Netherlands) Yelmer Buurman	P	All
(Germany) / Mercedes-AMG Team Black Falcon; (Germany) / Black Falcon	Mercedes-AMG GT3	4	(Germany) Maro Engel	P	All
(Germany) / Mercedes-AMG Team Black Falcon; (Germany) / Black Falcon	Mercedes-AMG GT3	4	(Germany) Luca Stolz	P	All
(Germany) / Mercedes-AMG Team Black Falcon; (Germany) / Black Falcon	Mercedes-AMG GT3	5	(Portugal) Rui Águas	PA	All
(Germany) / Mercedes-AMG Team Black Falcon; (Germany) / Black Falcon	Mercedes-AMG GT3	5	(Saudi Arabia) Saud Al Faisal	PA	All
(Germany) / Mercedes-AMG Team Black Falcon; (Germany) / Black Falcon	Mercedes-AMG GT3	5	(Greece) Kriton Lendoudis	PA	All
(Germany) / Mercedes-AMG Team Black Falcon; (Germany) / Black Falcon	Mercedes-AMG GT3	5	(United Kingdom) Tom Onslow-Cole	PA	4
(Germany) / Mercedes-AMG Team Black Falcon; (Germany) / Black Falcon	Mercedes-AMG GT3	6	(Saudi Arabia) Abdulaziz Al Faisal	S	All
(Germany) / Mercedes-AMG Team Black Falcon; (Germany) / Black Falcon	Mercedes-AMG GT3	6	(Germany) Hubert Haupt	S	All
(Germany) / Mercedes-AMG Team Black Falcon; (Germany) / Black Falcon	Mercedes-AMG GT3	6	(Italy) Gabriele Piana	S	All
(Germany) / Mercedes-AMG Team Black Falcon; (Germany) / Black Falcon	Mercedes-AMG GT3	6	(Germany) Manuel Metzger	S	4
(United Kingdom) Bentley Team M-Sport	Bentley Continental GT3 (2018)	7	(France) Jules Gounon	P	All
(United Kingdom) Bentley Team M-Sport	Bentley Continental GT3 (2018)	7	(United Kingdom) Steven Kane	P	All
(United Kingdom) Bentley Team M-Sport	Bentley Continental GT3 (2018)	7	(United Kingdom) Guy Smith	P	1–2
(United Kingdom) Bentley Team M-Sport	Bentley Continental GT3 (2018)	7	(South Africa) Jordan Pepper	P	3–5
(United Kingdom) Bentley Team M-Sport	Bentley Continental GT3 (2018)	8	(Monaco) Vincent Abril	P	All
(United Kingdom) Bentley Team M-Sport	Bentley Continental GT3 (2018)	8	(Spain) Andy Soucek	P	All
(United Kingdom) Bentley Team M-Sport	Bentley Continental GT3 (2018)	8	(Belgium) Maxime Soulet	P	All
(Italy) Target Racing	Lamborghini Huracán GT3	9	(Italy) Stefano Costantini	Am	4
(Italy) Target Racing	Lamborghini Huracán GT3	9	(France) Sylvain Debs	Am	4
(Italy) Target Racing	Lamborghini Huracán GT3	9	(Belgium) Bernard Delhez	Am	4
(Italy) Target Racing	Lamborghini Huracán GT3	9	(Italy) Alberto Di Folco	Am	4
(Switzerland) Kessel Racing	Ferrari 488 GT3	11	(Poland) Michał Broniszewski	PA	1, 5
(Switzerland) Kessel Racing	Ferrari 488 GT3	11	(Italy) Alessandro Pier Guidi	PA	1, 5
(Italy) Ombra Racing	Lamborghini Huracán GT3	12	(Italy) Alex Frassineti	S	All
(Italy) Ombra Racing	Lamborghini Huracán GT3	12	(France) Romain Monti	S	All
(Italy) Ombra Racing	Lamborghini Huracán GT3	12	(Italy) Andrea Rizzoli	S	All
(Italy) Ombra Racing	Lamborghini Huracán GT3	12	(China) Kang Ling	S	4
(Switzerland) / Emil Frey Lexus Racing (Note: Cars No. 14 and 114 entered as Emil Frey Lexus Racing and car No. 54 entered as Emil Frey Jaguar Racing.); (Switzerland) / Emil Frey Jaguar Racing	Lexus RC F GT3	14	(Spain) Albert Costa	P	All
(Switzerland) / Emil Frey Lexus Racing; (Switzerland) / Emil Frey Jaguar Racing	Lexus RC F GT3	14	(Austria) Christian Klien	P	All
(Switzerland) / Emil Frey Lexus Racing; (Switzerland) / Emil Frey Jaguar Racing	Lexus RC F GT3	14	(Germany) Marco Seefried	P	All
(Switzerland) / Emil Frey Lexus Racing; (Switzerland) / Emil Frey Jaguar Racing	Emil Frey GT3 Jaguar	54	(Switzerland) Alex Fontana	S	All
(Switzerland) / Emil Frey Lexus Racing; (Switzerland) / Emil Frey Jaguar Racing	Emil Frey GT3 Jaguar	54	(Canada) Mikaël Grenier	S	All
(Switzerland) / Emil Frey Lexus Racing; (Switzerland) / Emil Frey Jaguar Racing	Emil Frey GT3 Jaguar	54	(South Africa) Adrian Zaugg	S	All
(Switzerland) / Emil Frey Lexus Racing; (Switzerland) / Emil Frey Jaguar Racing	Lexus RC F GT3	114	(Monaco) Stéphane Ortelli	P	All
(Switzerland) / Emil Frey Lexus Racing; (Switzerland) / Emil Frey Jaguar Racing	Lexus RC F GT3	114	(Finland) Markus Palttala	P	All
(Switzerland) / Emil Frey Lexus Racing; (Switzerland) / Emil Frey Jaguar Racing	Lexus RC F GT3	114	(Austria) Norbert Siedler	P	All
(Italy) Antonelli Motorsport	Lamborghini Huracán GT3	18	(Italy) Giacomo Altoè	PA	4
(Italy) Antonelli Motorsport	Lamborghini Huracán GT3	18	(Italy) Gianluca Giraudi	PA	4
(Italy) Antonelli Motorsport	Lamborghini Huracán GT3	18	(United States) Juan Perez	PA	4
(Italy) Antonelli Motorsport	Lamborghini Huracán GT3	18	(Italy) Loris Spinelli	PA	4
(Austria) GRT Grasser Racing Team	Lamborghini Huracán GT3	19	(Italy) Raffaele Giammaria	P	All
(Austria) GRT Grasser Racing Team	Lamborghini Huracán GT3	19	(Argentina) Ezequiel Pérez Companc	P	All
(Austria) GRT Grasser Racing Team	Lamborghini Huracán GT3	19	(Italy) Marco Mapelli	P	1, 3–5
(Austria) GRT Grasser Racing Team	Lamborghini Huracán GT3	19	(Italy) Giovanni Venturini	P	2
(Austria) GRT Grasser Racing Team	Lamborghini Huracán GT3	63	(Italy) Mirko Bortolotti	P	All
(Austria) GRT Grasser Racing Team	Lamborghini Huracán GT3	63	(Italy) Andrea Caldarelli	P	All
(Austria) GRT Grasser Racing Team	Lamborghini Huracán GT3	63	(Germany) Christian Engelhart	P	All
(Austria) GRT Grasser Racing Team	Lamborghini Huracán GT3	82	(Switzerland) Rolf Ineichen	P	All
(Austria) GRT Grasser Racing Team	Lamborghini Huracán GT3	82	(United Kingdom) Phil Keen	P	All
(Austria) GRT Grasser Racing Team	Lamborghini Huracán GT3	82	(France) Franck Perera	P	All
(United Kingdom) GT SPORT MOTUL Team RJN	Nissan GT-R Nismo GT3 (2017)	22	(United Kingdom) Struan Moore	S	All
(United Kingdom) GT SPORT MOTUL Team RJN	Nissan GT-R Nismo GT3 (2017)	22	(Mexico) Ricardo Sánchez	S	All
(United Kingdom) GT SPORT MOTUL Team RJN	Nissan GT-R Nismo GT3 (2017)	22	(United Kingdom) Jordan Witt	S	1–4
(United Kingdom) GT SPORT MOTUL Team RJN	Nissan GT-R Nismo GT3 (2017)	22	(United Kingdom) Sean Walkinshaw	S	4
(United Kingdom) GT SPORT MOTUL Team RJN	Nissan GT-R Nismo GT3 (2017)	22	(United Kingdom) Colin Noble	S	5
(United Kingdom) GT SPORT MOTUL Team RJN	Nissan GT-R Nismo GT3 (2018)	23	(United Kingdom) Alex Buncombe	P	All
(United Kingdom) GT SPORT MOTUL Team RJN	Nissan GT-R Nismo GT3 (2018)	23	(United Kingdom) Matt Parry	P	All
(United Kingdom) GT SPORT MOTUL Team RJN	Nissan GT-R Nismo GT3 (2018)	23	(Spain) Lucas Ordóñez	P	1–4
(United Kingdom) GT SPORT MOTUL Team RJN	Nissan GT-R Nismo GT3 (2018)	23	(United Kingdom) Jann Mardenborough	P	5
(Germany) Reiter Young Stars	Lamborghini Gallardo R-EX	24	(Germany) Lennart Marioneck	S	1–3, 5
(Germany) Reiter Young Stars	Lamborghini Gallardo R-EX	24	(Switzerland) Patric Niederhauser	S	1–3, 5
(Germany) Reiter Young Stars	Lamborghini Gallardo R-EX	24	(Norway) Mads Siljehaug	S	1–3, 5
(France) / Saintéloc Racing (Note: Car No. 25 entered as Saintéloc Racing at Rounds 1 to 3 and 5 and as Audi Sport Team Saintéloc at Round 4. Car No. 26 entered as Saintéloc Racing.); (France) / Audi Sport Team Saintéloc	Audi R8 LMS	25	(Germany) Christopher Haase	P	All
(France) / Saintéloc Racing; (France) / Audi Sport Team Saintéloc	Audi R8 LMS	25	(France) Simon Gachet	P	1–3, 5
(France) / Saintéloc Racing; (France) / Audi Sport Team Saintéloc	Audi R8 LMS	25	(France) Antoine Jung	P	1–2
(France) / Saintéloc Racing; (France) / Audi Sport Team Saintéloc	Audi R8 LMS	25	(Germany) Markus Winkelhock	P	3–4
(France) / Saintéloc Racing; (France) / Audi Sport Team Saintéloc	Audi R8 LMS	25	(Belgium) Frédéric Vervisch	P	4
(France) / Saintéloc Racing; (France) / Audi Sport Team Saintéloc	Audi R8 LMS	25	(Switzerland) Ricardo Feller	P	5
(France) / Saintéloc Racing; (France) / Audi Sport Team Saintéloc	Audi R8 LMS	26	(France) Marc Rostan	PA	1–2, 5
(France) / Saintéloc Racing; (France) / Audi Sport Team Saintéloc	Audi R8 LMS	26	(France) Nyls Stievenart	PA	1–2, 5
(France) / Saintéloc Racing; (France) / Audi Sport Team Saintéloc	Audi R8 LMS	26	(Germany) Markus Winkelhock	PA	1–2, 5
(France) / Saintéloc Racing; (France) / Audi Sport Team Saintéloc	Audi R8 LMS	26	(Belgium) Christian Kelders	Am	3–4
(France) / Saintéloc Racing; (France) / Audi Sport Team Saintéloc	Audi R8 LMS	26	(France) Marc Rostan	Am	3–4
(France) / Saintéloc Racing; (France) / Audi Sport Team Saintéloc	Audi R8 LMS	26	(France) Nyls Stievenart	Am	3–4
(France) / Saintéloc Racing; (France) / Audi Sport Team Saintéloc	Audi R8 LMS	26	(France) Simon Gachet	Am	4
(Italy) Daiko Lazarus Racing	Lamborghini Huracán GT3	27	(Italy) Giuseppe Cipriani	PA	1–3, 5
(Italy) Daiko Lazarus Racing	Lamborghini Huracán GT3	27	(Italy) Fabrizio Crestani	PA	1–3, 5
(Italy) Daiko Lazarus Racing	Lamborghini Huracán GT3	27	(Portugal) Miguel Ramos	PA	1–3, 5
(Italy) Daiko Lazarus Racing	Lamborghini Huracán GT3	28	(France) Arno Santamato	S	All
(Italy) Daiko Lazarus Racing	Lamborghini Huracán GT3	28	(Italy) Stefano Gattuso	S	1–4
(Italy) Daiko Lazarus Racing	Lamborghini Huracán GT3	28	(Italy) Federico Leo	S	1–3
(Italy) Daiko Lazarus Racing	Lamborghini Huracán GT3	28	(Italy) Fabrizio Crestani	S	4
(Italy) Daiko Lazarus Racing	Lamborghini Huracán GT3	28	(Germany) Nicolas Pohler	S	4
(Italy) Daiko Lazarus Racing	Lamborghini Huracán GT3	28	(United Kingdom) Toby Sowery	S	5
(Germany) Montaplast by Land-Motorsport	Audi R8 LMS	29	(South Africa) Kelvin van der Linde	P	4
(Germany) Montaplast by Land-Motorsport	Audi R8 LMS	29	(South Africa) Sheldon van der Linde	P	4
(Germany) Montaplast by Land-Motorsport	Audi R8 LMS	29	(Switzerland) Jeffrey Schmidt	P	4
(Italy) Castrol Honda Racing	Honda NSX GT3	30	(Belgium) Bertrand Baguette	PA	4
(Italy) Castrol Honda Racing	Honda NSX GT3	30	(France) Loïc Depailler	PA	4
(Italy) Castrol Honda Racing	Honda NSX GT3	30	(Argentina) Esteban Guerrieri	PA	4
(Italy) Castrol Honda Racing	Honda NSX GT3	30	(Italy) Riccardo Patrese	PA	4
(United Kingdom) Team Parker Racing	Bentley Continental GT3 (2016)	31	(United Kingdom) Seb Morris	PA	All
(United Kingdom) Team Parker Racing	Bentley Continental GT3 (2016)	31	(United Kingdom) Derek Pierce	PA	All
(United Kingdom) Team Parker Racing	Bentley Continental GT3 (2016)	31	(United Kingdom) Rob Smith	PA	All
(United Kingdom) Team Parker Racing	Bentley Continental GT3 (2016)	31	(United Kingdom) Andy Meyrick	PA	4
(Slovakia) ARC Bratislava	Mercedes-AMG GT3	33	(Slovakia) Miroslav Konôpka	PA	1
(Slovakia) ARC Bratislava	Mercedes-AMG GT3	33	(Poland) Andrzej Lewandowski	PA	1
(Slovakia) ARC Bratislava	Mercedes-AMG GT3	33	(China) Kang Ling	PA	1
(Germany) Walkenhorst Motorsport	BMW M6 GT3	34	(United Kingdom) Tom Blomqvist	P	4
(Germany) Walkenhorst Motorsport	BMW M6 GT3	34	(Austria) Philipp Eng	P	4
(Germany) Walkenhorst Motorsport	BMW M6 GT3	34	(Norway) Christian Krognes	P	4
(Germany) Walkenhorst Motorsport	BMW M6 GT3	36	(Germany) Immanuel Vinke	Am	All
(Germany) Walkenhorst Motorsport	BMW M6 GT3	36	(Germany) Henry Walkenhorst	Am	1–2, 4–5
(Germany) Walkenhorst Motorsport	BMW M6 GT3	36	(Norway) Anders Buchardt	Am	1, 3–4
(Germany) Walkenhorst Motorsport	BMW M6 GT3	36	(Germany) Andreas Ziegler	Am	2
(Germany) Walkenhorst Motorsport	BMW M6 GT3	36	(Germany) Ralf Oeverhaus	Am	3–5
(Russia) / SMP Racing by AKKA ASP (Note: Car No. 35 entered as SMP Racing by AKKA ASP, running a Mercedes-AMG GT3. Cars No. 72 entered as SMP Racing, running a Ferrari 488 GT3.); (Russia) / SMP Racing	Mercedes-AMG GT3	35	(Russia) Denis Bulatov	P	All
(Russia) / SMP Racing by AKKA ASP; (Russia) / SMP Racing	Mercedes-AMG GT3	35	(United Kingdom) Michael Meadows	P	All
(Russia) / SMP Racing by AKKA ASP; (Russia) / SMP Racing	Mercedes-AMG GT3	35	(Russia) Vitaly Petrov	P	1–4
(Russia) / SMP Racing by AKKA ASP; (Russia) / SMP Racing	Mercedes-AMG GT3	35	(Russia) Aleksey Korneev	P	5
(Russia) / SMP Racing by AKKA ASP; (Russia) / SMP Racing	Ferrari 488 GT3	72	(Russia) Mikhail Aleshin	P	All
(Russia) / SMP Racing by AKKA ASP; (Russia) / SMP Racing	Ferrari 488 GT3	72	(Spain) Miguel Molina	P	All
(Russia) / SMP Racing by AKKA ASP; (Russia) / SMP Racing	Ferrari 488 GT3	72	(Italy) Davide Rigon	P	All
(United Kingdom) / Strakka Racing (Note: Car No. 42 entered as Strakka Racing. Car No. 43 entered as Strakka Racing at Rounds 1 to 3 and as Mercedes-AMG Team Strakka Racing at Rounds 4 and 5. Car No. 44 entered as Strakka Racing.); (United Kingdom) / Mercedes-AMG Team Strakka Racing	Mercedes-AMG GT3	42	(United Kingdom) Chris Buncombe	PA	All
(United Kingdom) / Strakka Racing; (United Kingdom) / Mercedes-AMG Team Strakka Racing	Mercedes-AMG GT3	42	(United Kingdom) Nick Leventis	PA	All
(United Kingdom) / Strakka Racing; (United Kingdom) / Mercedes-AMG Team Strakka Racing	Mercedes-AMG GT3	42	(United Kingdom) Lewis Williamson	PA	All
(United Kingdom) / Strakka Racing; (United Kingdom) / Mercedes-AMG Team Strakka Racing	Mercedes-AMG GT3	42	(Italy) David Fumanelli	PA	4
(United Kingdom) / Strakka Racing; (United Kingdom) / Mercedes-AMG Team Strakka Racing	Mercedes-AMG GT3	43	(Germany) Maximilian Buhk	P	All
(United Kingdom) / Strakka Racing; (United Kingdom) / Mercedes-AMG Team Strakka Racing	Mercedes-AMG GT3	43	(Germany) Maximilian Götz	P	All
(United Kingdom) / Strakka Racing; (United Kingdom) / Mercedes-AMG Team Strakka Racing	Mercedes-AMG GT3	43	(Portugal) Álvaro Parente	P	1, 3–5
(United Kingdom) / Strakka Racing; (United Kingdom) / Mercedes-AMG Team Strakka Racing	Mercedes-AMG GT3	43	(Italy) David Fumanelli	P	2
(United Kingdom) / Strakka Racing; (United Kingdom) / Mercedes-AMG Team Strakka Racing	Mercedes-AMG GT3	44	(France) Adrien Tambay	P	1–3
(United Kingdom) / Strakka Racing; (United Kingdom) / Mercedes-AMG Team Strakka Racing	Mercedes-AMG GT3	44	(Italy) David Fumanelli	P	1, 3
(United Kingdom) / Strakka Racing; (United Kingdom) / Mercedes-AMG Team Strakka Racing	Mercedes-AMG GT3	44	(Austria) Lucas Auer	P	1
(United Kingdom) / Strakka Racing; (United Kingdom) / Mercedes-AMG Team Strakka Racing	Mercedes-AMG GT3	44	(United Kingdom) Oliver Rowland	P	2, 5
(United Kingdom) / Strakka Racing; (United Kingdom) / Mercedes-AMG Team Strakka Racing	Mercedes-AMG GT3	44	(Germany) Thomas Jäger	P	2
(United Kingdom) / Strakka Racing; (United Kingdom) / Mercedes-AMG Team Strakka Racing	Mercedes-AMG GT3	44	(Brazil) Felipe Fraga	P	3–5
(United Kingdom) / Strakka Racing; (United Kingdom) / Mercedes-AMG Team Strakka Racing	Mercedes-AMG GT3	44	(Germany) Christian Vietoris	P	4–5
(United Kingdom) / Strakka Racing; (United Kingdom) / Mercedes-AMG Team Strakka Racing	Mercedes-AMG GT3	44	(Brazil) Rubens Barrichello	P	4
(United Kingdom) Ram Racing	Mercedes-AMG GT3	49	(United Kingdom) Euan Hankey	PA	1–4
(United Kingdom) Ram Racing	Mercedes-AMG GT3	49	(Turkey) Salih Yoluç	PA	1–4
(United Kingdom) Ram Racing	Mercedes-AMG GT3	49	(United Kingdom) Darren Burke	PA	2–4
(United Kingdom) Ram Racing	Mercedes-AMG GT3	49	(Sweden) Felix Rosenqvist	PA	4
(United Kingdom) Ram Racing	Mercedes-AMG GT3	49	(United Kingdom) Tom Onslow-Cole	PA	5
(United Kingdom) Ram Racing	Mercedes-AMG GT3	49	(Netherlands) Remon Vos	PA	5
(Italy) AF Corse (Note: Cars No. 51 and 53 entered as AF Corse under Italian licence, car No. 72 entered as SMP Racing under Russian licence, car No. 75 entered as T2 Motorsports under Singaporean licence and car No. 961 entered as 961 Corse under Swiss licence.) (Singapore) T2 Motorsports (Switzerland) 961 Corse	Ferrari 488 GT3	51	(United Kingdom) Duncan Cameron	PA	All
(Italy) AF Corse (Singapore) T2 Motorsports (Switzerland) 961 Corse	Ferrari 488 GT3	51	(Republic of Ireland) Matt Griffin	PA	All
(Italy) AF Corse (Singapore) T2 Motorsports (Switzerland) 961 Corse	Ferrari 488 GT3	51	(Italy) Gianluca de Lorenzi	PA	3
(Italy) AF Corse (Singapore) T2 Motorsports (Switzerland) 961 Corse	Ferrari 488 GT3	51	(Italy) Lorenzo Bontempelli	PA	4–5
(Italy) AF Corse (Singapore) T2 Motorsports (Switzerland) 961 Corse	Ferrari 488 GT3	51	(United Kingdom) Aaron Scott	PA	4
(Italy) AF Corse (Singapore) T2 Motorsports (Switzerland) 961 Corse	Ferrari 488 GT3	53	(Italy) Andrea Bertolini	PA	All
(Italy) AF Corse (Singapore) T2 Motorsports (Switzerland) 961 Corse	Ferrari 488 GT3	53	(Netherlands) Niek Hommerson	PA	All
(Italy) AF Corse (Singapore) T2 Motorsports (Switzerland) 961 Corse	Ferrari 488 GT3	53	(Belgium) Louis Machiels	PA	All
(Italy) AF Corse (Singapore) T2 Motorsports (Switzerland) 961 Corse	Ferrari 488 GT3	53	(Italy) Marco Cioci	PA	4
(Italy) AF Corse (Singapore) T2 Motorsports (Switzerland) 961 Corse	Ferrari 488 GT3	75	(Italy) Christian Colombo	Am	4
(Italy) AF Corse (Singapore) T2 Motorsports (Switzerland) 961 Corse	Ferrari 488 GT3	75	(Italy) Matteo Cressoni	Am	4
(Italy) AF Corse (Singapore) T2 Motorsports (Switzerland) 961 Corse	Ferrari 488 GT3	75	(Singapore) Gregory Teo	Am	4
(Italy) AF Corse (Singapore) T2 Motorsports (Switzerland) 961 Corse	Ferrari 488 GT3	75	(Indonesia) David Tjiptobiantoro	Am	4
(Italy) AF Corse (Singapore) T2 Motorsports (Switzerland) 961 Corse	Ferrari 488 GT3	961	(Italy) Lorenzo Bontempelli	PA	1
(Italy) AF Corse (Singapore) T2 Motorsports (Switzerland) 961 Corse	Ferrari 488 GT3	961	(Lebanon) Alex Demirdjian	PA	1
(Italy) AF Corse (Singapore) T2 Motorsports (Switzerland) 961 Corse	Ferrari 488 GT3	961	(Italy) Giancarlo Fisichella	PA	1
(Germany) Attempto Racing	Audi R8 LMS	55	(Germany) Pierre Kaffer	P	1–4
(Germany) Attempto Racing	Audi R8 LMS	55	(Switzerland) Jeffrey Schmidt	P	1–3
(Germany) Attempto Racing	Audi R8 LMS	55	(Germany) Nicolas Pohler	P	1–2
(Germany) Attempto Racing	Audi R8 LMS	55	(Germany) Kim-Luis Schramm	P	3–5
(Germany) Attempto Racing	Audi R8 LMS	55	(Austria) Clemens Schmid	P	4–5
(Germany) Attempto Racing	Audi R8 LMS	55	(Denmark) Anders Fjordbach	P	5
(Germany) Attempto Racing	Audi R8 LMS	66	(Netherlands) Pieter Schothorst	P	All
(Germany) Attempto Racing	Audi R8 LMS	66	(Netherlands) Steijn Schothorst	P	All
(Germany) Attempto Racing	Audi R8 LMS	66	(South Africa) Kelvin van der Linde	P	1–3, 5
(Germany) Attempto Racing	Audi R8 LMS	66	(United Kingdom) Jamie Green	P	4
(Germany) Attempto Racing	Lamborghini Huracán GT3	666	(Austria) Sven Heyrowsky	Am	4
(Germany) Attempto Racing	Lamborghini Huracán GT3	666	(Germany) John-Louis Jasper	Am	4
(Germany) Attempto Racing	Lamborghini Huracán GT3	666	(Switzerland) Jürgen Krebs	Am	4
(Germany) Attempto Racing	Lamborghini Huracán GT3	666	(Switzerland) Tim Müller	Am	4
(Germany) Attempto Racing	Lamborghini Huracán GT3	666	(Finland) Rory Penttinen	Am	4
(United Kingdom) Garage 59	McLaren 650S GT3	58	(United Kingdom) Ben Barnicoat	P	All
(United Kingdom) Garage 59	McLaren 650S GT3	58	(France) Côme Ledogar	P	All
(United Kingdom) Garage 59	McLaren 650S GT3	58	(United Kingdom) Andrew Watson	P	1–3, 5
(United Kingdom) Garage 59	McLaren 650S GT3	58	(France) Olivier Pla	P	4
(United Kingdom) Garage 59	McLaren 650S GT3	188	(United Kingdom) Chris Goodwin	Am	All
(United Kingdom) Garage 59	McLaren 650S GT3	188	(United Kingdom) Chris Harris	Am	All
(United Kingdom) Garage 59	McLaren 650S GT3	188	(Sweden) Alexander West	Am	All
(United Kingdom) Garage 59	McLaren 650S GT3	188	(United Kingdom) Andrew Watson	Am	4
(Switzerland) R-Motorsport	Aston Martin V12 Vantage GT3	62	(Germany) Marvin Kirchhöfer	P	All
(Switzerland) R-Motorsport	Aston Martin V12 Vantage GT3	62	(Belgium) Maxime Martin	P	All
(Switzerland) R-Motorsport	Aston Martin V12 Vantage GT3	62	(United Kingdom) Alex Brundle	P	1–3
(Switzerland) R-Motorsport	Aston Martin V12 Vantage GT3	62	(Austria) Dominik Baumann	P	4–5
(Switzerland) R-Motorsport	Aston Martin V12 Vantage GT3	76	(United Kingdom) Jake Dennis	P	All
(Switzerland) R-Motorsport	Aston Martin V12 Vantage GT3	76	(Denmark) Nicki Thiim	P	All
(Switzerland) R-Motorsport	Aston Martin V12 Vantage GT3	76	(France) Matthieu Vaxivière	P	All
(United Kingdom) Barwell Motorsport	Lamborghini Huracán GT3	77	(Switzerland) Adrian Amstutz	Am	All
(United Kingdom) Barwell Motorsport	Lamborghini Huracán GT3	77	(Russia) Leo Machitski	Am	All
(United Kingdom) Barwell Motorsport	Lamborghini Huracán GT3	77	(Portugal) Francisco Guedes	Am	1, 3
(United Kingdom) Barwell Motorsport	Lamborghini Huracán GT3	77	(United Kingdom) Jon Minshaw	Am	2
(United Kingdom) Barwell Motorsport	Lamborghini Huracán GT3	77	(United Kingdom) Richard Abra	Am	4–5
(United Kingdom) Barwell Motorsport	Lamborghini Huracán GT3	77	(Finland) Patrick Kujala	Am	4
(United Kingdom) Barwell Motorsport	Lamborghini Huracán GT3	78	(Italy) Michele Beretta	S	All
(United Kingdom) Barwell Motorsport	Lamborghini Huracán GT3	78	(Croatia) Martin Kodrić	S	All
(United Kingdom) Barwell Motorsport	Lamborghini Huracán GT3	78	(United Kingdom) Sandy Mitchell	S	All
(United Kingdom) Barwell Motorsport	Lamborghini Huracán GT3	78	(Netherlands) Rik Breukers	S	4
(Germany) (Australia) / Mercedes-AMG Team MANN-FILTER (Note: Car No. 84 entered as Mercedes-AMG Team MANN-FILTER under German licence and car No. 175 entered as SunEnergy1 Team HTP Motorsport under Australian licence..); (Germany) (Australia) / SunEnergy1 Team HTP Motorsport	Mercedes-AMG GT3	84	(Switzerland) Edoardo Mortara	P	4
(Germany) (Australia) / Mercedes-AMG Team MANN-FILTER; (Germany) (Australia) / SunEnergy1 Team HTP Motorsport	Mercedes-AMG GT3	84	(United Kingdom) Gary Paffett	P	4
(Germany) (Australia) / Mercedes-AMG Team MANN-FILTER; (Germany) (Australia) / SunEnergy1 Team HTP Motorsport	Mercedes-AMG GT3	84	(Netherlands) Renger van der Zande	P	4
(Germany) (Australia) / Mercedes-AMG Team MANN-FILTER; (Germany) (Australia) / SunEnergy1 Team HTP Motorsport	Mercedes-AMG GT3	175	(Australia) Kenny Habul	PA	4
(Germany) (Australia) / Mercedes-AMG Team MANN-FILTER; (Germany) (Australia) / SunEnergy1 Team HTP Motorsport	Mercedes-AMG GT3	175	(Germany) Thomas Jäger	PA	4
(Germany) (Australia) / Mercedes-AMG Team MANN-FILTER; (Germany) (Australia) / SunEnergy1 Team HTP Motorsport	Mercedes-AMG GT3	175	(Austria) Martin Konrad	PA	4
(Germany) (Australia) / Mercedes-AMG Team MANN-FILTER; (Germany) (Australia) / SunEnergy1 Team HTP Motorsport	Mercedes-AMG GT3	175	(Germany) Bernd Schneider	PA	4
(France) / Mercedes-AMG Team AKKA ASP (Note: Cars No. 87, 89 and 90 entered as AKKA ASP Team and car No. 88 entered as Mercedes-AMG Team AKKA ASP.); (France) / AKKA ASP Team	Mercedes-AMG GT3	87	(France) Jean-Luc Beaubelique	PA	1–3, 5
(France) / Mercedes-AMG Team AKKA ASP; (France) / AKKA ASP Team	Mercedes-AMG GT3	87	(France) Nico Jamin	PA	1–3, 5
(France) / Mercedes-AMG Team AKKA ASP; (France) / AKKA ASP Team	Mercedes-AMG GT3	87	(Italy) Mauro Ricci	PA	1–3, 5
(France) / Mercedes-AMG Team AKKA ASP; (France) / AKKA ASP Team	Mercedes-AMG GT3	88	(Italy) Raffaele Marciello	P	All
(France) / Mercedes-AMG Team AKKA ASP; (France) / AKKA ASP Team	Mercedes-AMG GT3	88	(France) Tristan Vautier	P	1–2, 4–5
(France) / Mercedes-AMG Team AKKA ASP; (France) / AKKA ASP Team	Mercedes-AMG GT3	88	(Spain) Daniel Juncadella	P	1, 4–5
(France) / Mercedes-AMG Team AKKA ASP; (France) / AKKA ASP Team	Mercedes-AMG GT3	88	(United Kingdom) Adam Christodoulou	P	2–3
(France) / Mercedes-AMG Team AKKA ASP; (France) / AKKA ASP Team	Mercedes-AMG GT3	88	(Germany) Thomas Jäger	P	3
(France) / Mercedes-AMG Team AKKA ASP; (France) / AKKA ASP Team	Mercedes-AMG GT3	89	(France) Fabien Barthez	Am	All
(France) / Mercedes-AMG Team AKKA ASP; (France) / AKKA ASP Team	Mercedes-AMG GT3	89	(France) Eric Debard	Am	All
(France) / Mercedes-AMG Team AKKA ASP; (France) / AKKA ASP Team	Mercedes-AMG GT3	89	(Switzerland) Philippe Giauque	Am	1–4
(France) / Mercedes-AMG Team AKKA ASP; (France) / AKKA ASP Team	Mercedes-AMG GT3	89	(France) Nico Jamin	Am	4
(France) / Mercedes-AMG Team AKKA ASP; (France) / AKKA ASP Team	Mercedes-AMG GT3	90	(Germany) Nico Bastian	S	All
(France) / Mercedes-AMG Team AKKA ASP; (France) / AKKA ASP Team	Mercedes-AMG GT3	90	(United Kingdom) Jack Manchester	S	All
(France) / Mercedes-AMG Team AKKA ASP; (France) / AKKA ASP Team	Mercedes-AMG GT3	90	(Netherlands) Jules Szymkowiak	S	All
(France) / Mercedes-AMG Team AKKA ASP; (France) / AKKA ASP Team	Mercedes-AMG GT3	90	(Germany) Fabian Schiller	S	4
Oman Racing with TF Sport	Aston Martin V12 Vantage GT3	97	(Republic of Ireland) Charlie Eastwood	S	All
Oman Racing with TF Sport	Aston Martin V12 Vantage GT3	97	(Oman) Ahmad Al Harthy	S	All
Oman Racing with TF Sport	Aston Martin V12 Vantage GT3	97	(United Kingdom) Euan McKay	S	All
Oman Racing with TF Sport	Aston Martin V12 Vantage GT3	97	(United Kingdom) Ross Gunn	S	4
(Germany) Rowe Racing	BMW M6 GT3	98	(United Kingdom) Ricky Collard	P	1–4
(Germany) Rowe Racing	BMW M6 GT3	98	(Finland) Jesse Krohn	P	1, 3–4
(Germany) Rowe Racing	BMW M6 GT3	98	(Germany) Jens Klingmann	P	1, 5
(Germany) Rowe Racing	BMW M6 GT3	98	(United Kingdom) Nick Yelloly	P	2–3
(Germany) Rowe Racing	BMW M6 GT3	98	(United States) John Edwards	P	2
(Germany) Rowe Racing	BMW M6 GT3	98	(Germany) Marco Wittmann	P	4
(Germany) Rowe Racing	BMW M6 GT3	98	(United Kingdom) Tom Blomqvist	P	5
(Germany) Rowe Racing	BMW M6 GT3	98	(Netherlands) Nick Catsburg	P	5
(Germany) Rowe Racing	BMW M6 GT3	99	(United Kingdom) Alexander Sims	P	1, 4–5
(Germany) Rowe Racing	BMW M6 GT3	99	(Netherlands) Nick Catsburg	P	1, 4
(Germany) Rowe Racing	BMW M6 GT3	99	(Germany) Marco Wittmann	P	1
(Germany) Rowe Racing	BMW M6 GT3	99	(Germany) Jens Klingmann	P	2–4
(Germany) Rowe Racing	BMW M6 GT3	99	(Finland) Jesse Krohn	P	2, 5
(Germany) Rowe Racing	BMW M6 GT3	99	(United States) Connor De Phillippi	P	2
(Germany) Rowe Racing	BMW M6 GT3	99	(United Kingdom) Tom Blomqvist	P	3
(Germany) Rowe Racing	BMW M6 GT3	99	(Australia) Chaz Mostert	P	3
(Germany) Rowe Racing	BMW M6 GT3	99	(Austria) Philipp Eng	P	5
(Belgium) Brussels Racing	Aston Martin V12 Vantage GT3	100	(Belgium) Sam Dejonghe	PA	4
(Belgium) Brussels Racing	Aston Martin V12 Vantage GT3	100	(Belgium) Nicolas Vandierendonck	PA	4
(Belgium) Brussels Racing	Aston Martin V12 Vantage GT3	100	(Belgium) Tim Verbergt	PA	4
(Belgium) Brussels Racing	Aston Martin V12 Vantage GT3	100	(Belgium) Koen Wauters	PA	4
(Germany) Aust Motorsport	Audi R8 LMS	111	(Germany) Tobias Dauenhauer	S	4
(Germany) Aust Motorsport	Audi R8 LMS	111	(Switzerland) Philipp Frommenwiler	S	4
(Germany) Aust Motorsport	Audi R8 LMS	111	(Netherlands) Loris Hezemans	S	4
(Germany) Aust Motorsport	Audi R8 LMS	111	(Switzerland) Nikolaj Rogivue	S	4
(Germany) KÜS Team75 Bernhard	Porsche 911 GT3 R	117	(New Zealand) Earl Bamber	P	4
(Germany) KÜS Team75 Bernhard	Porsche 911 GT3 R	117	(Germany) Timo Bernhard	P	4
(Germany) KÜS Team75 Bernhard	Porsche 911 GT3 R	117	(Belgium) Laurens Vanthoor	P	4
(Germany) Rinaldi Racing	Ferrari 488 GT3	333	(Germany) Alexander Mattschull	PA	All
(Germany) Rinaldi Racing	Ferrari 488 GT3	333	(Russia) Rinat Salikhov	PA	All
(Germany) Rinaldi Racing	Ferrari 488 GT3	333	(Germany) Dominik Schwager	PA	1
(Germany) Rinaldi Racing	Ferrari 488 GT3	333	(Germany) Daniel Keilwitz	PA	2, 4–5
(Germany) Rinaldi Racing	Ferrari 488 GT3	333	(Germany) Luca Ludwig	PA	3
(Germany) Rinaldi Racing	Ferrari 488 GT3	333	(South Africa) David Perel	PA	4
(Germany) Rinaldi Racing	Ferrari 488 GT3	488	(Germany) Pierre Ehret	Am	All
(Germany) Rinaldi Racing	Ferrari 488 GT3	488	(South Korea) Rick Yoon	Am	All
(Germany) Rinaldi Racing	Ferrari 488 GT3	488	(Finland) Rory Penttinen	Am	1–3, 5
(Germany) Rinaldi Racing	Ferrari 488 GT3	488	(United States) Nicholas Boulle	Am	4
(Germany) Rinaldi Racing	Ferrari 488 GT3	488	(Germany) Murad Sultanov	Am	4
(United States) Black Swan Racing	Porsche 911 GT3 R	540	(Netherlands) Jeroen Bleekemolen	PA	4
(United States) Black Swan Racing	Porsche 911 GT3 R	540	(Germany) Marc Lieb	PA	4
(United States) Black Swan Racing	Porsche 911 GT3 R	540	(United States) Marc Miller	PA	4
(United States) Black Swan Racing	Porsche 911 GT3 R	540	(United States) Tim Pappas	PA	4
(Austria) HB Racing	Ferrari 488 GT3	777	(Germany) Jens Liebhauser	PA	5
(Austria) HB Racing	Ferrari 488 GT3	777	(Germany) Luca Ludwig	PA	5
(Austria) HB Racing	Ferrari 488 GT3	777	(Germany) Florian Scholze	PA	5
(Germany) Car Collection Motorsport	Audi R8 LMS	888	(Spain) Toni Forné	PA	1, 3, 5
(Germany) Car Collection Motorsport	Audi R8 LMS	888	(Germany) Frank Stippler	PA	1, 3, 5
(Germany) Car Collection Motorsport	Audi R8 LMS	888	(Germany) Dimitri Parhofer	PA	1, 5
(Germany) Car Collection Motorsport	Audi R8 LMS	888	(Germany) Mike Hansch	PA	3
(Germany) Manthey Racing	Porsche 911 GT3 R	911	(France) Romain Dumas	P	All
(Germany) Manthey Racing	Porsche 911 GT3 R	911	(France) Frédéric Makowiecki	P	All
(Germany) Manthey Racing	Porsche 911 GT3 R	911	(Germany) Dirk Werner	P	All
(Germany) Herberth Motorsport	Porsche 911 GT3 R	991	(Germany) Edward Lewis Brauner	Am	All
(Germany) Herberth Motorsport	Porsche 911 GT3 R	991	(Germany) Jürgen Häring	Am	All
(Germany) Herberth Motorsport	Porsche 911 GT3 R	991	(Germany) Wolfgang Triller	Am	All
(Germany) Herberth Motorsport	Porsche 911 GT3 R	991	(Germany) Alfred Renauer	Am	4
Group N entries are ineligible to score points
(Italy) GDL Racing	Lamborghini Huracán LP 620-2 Super Trofeo	67	(Belgium) Sarah Bovy	N	4
(Italy) GDL Racing	Lamborghini Huracán LP 620-2 Super Trofeo	67	(Italy) Beniamino Caccia	N	4
(Italy) GDL Racing	Lamborghini Huracán LP 620-2 Super Trofeo	67	(Indonesia) Andrew Haryanto	N	4
(Italy) GDL Racing	Lamborghini Huracán LP 620-2 Super Trofeo	67	(Argentina) Andrés Josephsohn	N	4
(Belgium) SpeedLover	Porsche 911 GT3 Cup	70	(Belgium) Grégory Paisse	N	4
(Belgium) SpeedLover	Porsche 911 GT3 Cup	70	(Belgium) Pierre-Yves Paque	N	4
(Belgium) SpeedLover	Porsche 911 GT3 Cup	70	(France) Gilles Petit	N	4
(Belgium) SpeedLover	Porsche 911 GT3 Cup	70	(Luxembourg) Bob Wilwert	N	4

Icon	Class
P	Pro Cup
S	Silver Cup
PA	Pro-Am Cup
Am	Am Cup
N	Group N

== Race results ==
Bold indicates overall winner.

Round	Circuit	Pole position	Pro Winners	Silver Winners	Pro-Am Winners	Am Winners
1	(Italy) Monza	(Russia) No. 72 SMP Racing	**(Belgium) No. 1 Belgian Audi Club Team WRT**	(Switzerland) No. 54 Emil Frey Jaguar Racing	(Germany) No. 333 Rinaldi Racing	(France) No. 89 AKKA ASP Team
1	(Italy) Monza	(Russia) Mikhail Aleshin (Spain) Miguel Molina (Italy) Davide Rigon	**(Germany) Christopher Mies** **(Spain) Alex Riberas** **(Belgium) Dries Vanthoor**	(Switzerland) Alex Fontana (Canada) Mikaël Grenier (South Africa) Adrian Zaugg	(Germany) Alexander Mattschull (Russia) Rinat Salikhov (Germany) Dominik Schwager	(France) Fabien Barthez (France) Eric Debard (Switzerland) Philippe Giauque
2	(United Kingdom) Silverstone	(Switzerland) No. 76 R-Motorsport	**(Switzerland) No. 76 R-Motorsport**	(Germany) No. 6 Black Falcon	(United Kingdom) No. 49 Ram Racing	(United Kingdom) No. 188 Garage 59
2	(United Kingdom) Silverstone	(United Kingdom) Jake Dennis (Denmark) Nicki Thiim (France) Matthieu Vaxivière	**(United Kingdom) Jake Dennis** **(Denmark) Nicki Thiim** **(France) Matthieu Vaxivière**	(Saudi Arabia) Abdulaziz Al Faisal (Germany) Hubert Haupt (Italy) Gabriele Piana	(United Kingdom) Darren Burke (United Kingdom) Euan Hankey (Turkey) Salih Yoluç	(United Kingdom) Chris Goodwin (United Kingdom) Chris Harris (Sweden) Alexander West
3	(France) Paul Ricard	(Switzerland) No. 76 R-Motorsport	**(Switzerland) No. 14 Emil Frey Lexus Racing**	(United Kingdom) No. 78 Barwell Motorsport	(Italy) No. 51 AF Corse	(United Kingdom) No. 188 Garage 59
3	(France) Paul Ricard	(United Kingdom) Jake Dennis (Denmark) Nicki Thiim (France) Matthieu Vaxivière	**(Spain) Albert Costa** **(Austria) Christian Klien** **(Germany) Marco Seefried**	(Italy) Michele Beretta (Croatia) Martin Kodrić (United Kingdom) Sandy Mitchell	(United Kingdom) Duncan Cameron (Republic of Ireland) Matt Griffin (Italy) Gianluca de Lorenzi	(United Kingdom) Chris Goodwin (United Kingdom) Chris Harris (Sweden) Alexander West
4	(Belgium) Spa-Francorchamps	(Switzerland) No. 62 R-Motorsport	**(Germany) No. 34 Walkenhorst Motorsport**	(Italy) No. 12 Ombra Racing	(Germany) No. 333 Rinaldi Racing	(United Kingdom) No. 77 Barwell Motorsport
4	(Belgium) Spa-Francorchamps	(Austria) Dominik Baumann (Germany) Marvin Kirchhöfer (Belgium) Maxime Martin	**(United Kingdom) Tom Blomqvist** **(Austria) Philipp Eng** **(Norway) Christian Krognes**	(Italy) Alex Frassineti (China) Kang Ling (France) Romain Monti (Italy) Andrea Rizzoli	(Germany) Daniel Keilwitz (Germany) Alexander Mattschull (South Africa) David Perel (Russia) Rinat Salikhov	(United Kingdom) Richard Abra (Switzerland) Adrian Amstutz (Finland) Patrick Kujala (Russia) Leo Machitski
5	(Spain) Barcelona-Catalunya	(Germany) No. 4 Mercedes-AMG Team Black Falcon	**(Germany) No. 4 Mercedes-AMG Team Black Falcon**	(Switzerland) No. 54 Emil Frey Jaguar Racing	(Italy) No. 27 Daiko Lazarus Racing	(United Kingdom) No. 77 Barwell Motorsport
5	(Spain) Barcelona-Catalunya	(Netherlands) Yelmer Buurman (Germany) Maro Engel (Germany) Luca Stolz	**(Netherlands) Yelmer Buurman** **(Germany) Maro Engel** **(Germany) Luca Stolz**	(Switzerland) Alex Fontana (Canada) Mikaël Grenier (South Africa) Adrian Zaugg	(Italy) Giuseppe Cipriani (Italy) Fabrizio Crestani (Portugal) Miguel Ramos	(United Kingdom) Richard Abra (Switzerland) Adrian Amstutz (Russia) Leo Machitski

== Championship standings ==
Scoring system

Championship points were awarded for the first ten positions in each race. The pole-sitter also received one point and entries were required to complete 75% of the winning car's race distance in order to be classified and earn points. Individual drivers were required to participate for a minimum of 25 minutes in order to earn championship points in any race.

Race points

Position	**1st**	**2nd**	**3rd**	**4th**	**5th**	**6th**	**7th**	**8th**	**9th**	**10th**	**Pole**
Points	25	18	15	12	10	8	6	4	2	1	1

1000 km Paul Ricard points

Position	**1st**	**2nd**	**3rd**	**4th**	**5th**	**6th**	**7th**	**8th**	**9th**	**10th**	**Pole**
Points	33	24	19	15	12	9	6	4	2	1	1

24 Hours of Spa points

Points were awarded after six hours, after twelve hours and at the finish.

Position	**1st**	**2nd**	**3rd**	**4th**	**5th**	**6th**	**7th**	**8th**	**9th**	**10th**	**Pole**
Points after 6hrs/12hrs	12	9	7	6	5	4	3	2	1	0	1
Points at the finish	25	18	15	12	10	8	6	4	2	1	1

=== Drivers' championships ===
==== Overall ====
Pos.	Driver	Team	MNZ (Italy)	SIL (United Kingdom)	LEC (France)	SPA (Belgium)			CAT (Spain)	Points
Pos.	Driver	Team	MNZ (Italy)	SIL (United Kingdom)	LEC (France)	6hrs	12hrs	24hrs	CAT (Spain)	Points
1	(Netherlands) Yelmer Buurman (Germany) Maro Engel (Germany) Luca Stolz	(Germany) Mercedes-AMG Team Black Falcon	3	6	Ret	5	2	5	**1**	73
2	(Italy) Raffaele Marciello	(France) Mercedes-AMG Team AKKA ASP	11	2	4	15	3	6	2	66
3	(France) Tristan Vautier	(France) Mercedes-AMG Team AKKA ASP	11	2		15	3	6	2	51
4	(Austria) Philipp Eng	(Germany) Walkenhorst Motorsport				4	1	1		47
4	(Austria) Philipp Eng	(Germany) Rowe Racing							8	47
5	(United Kingdom) Tom Blomqvist	(Germany) Rowe Racing			11				9	45
5	(United Kingdom) Tom Blomqvist	(Germany) Walkenhorst Motorsport				4	1	1		45
6	(Norway) Christian Krognes	(Germany) Walkenhorst Motorsport				4	1	1		43
7	(Germany) Christopher Mies (Spain) Alex Riberas (Belgium) Dries Vanthoor	(Belgium) Belgian Audi Club Team WRT	1	4	Ret				15	37
7	(Germany) Christopher Mies (Spain) Alex Riberas (Belgium) Dries Vanthoor	(Belgium) Audi Sport Team WRT				24	15	40		37
8	(South Africa) Kelvin van der Linde	(Germany) Attempto Racing	6	19	Ret				DNS	36
8	(South Africa) Kelvin van der Linde	(Germany) Montaplast by Land-Motorsport				1	9	3		36
9	(Spain) Albert Costa (Austria) Christian Klien (Germany) Marco Seefried	(Switzerland) Emil Frey Lexus Racing	17	9	1	31	20	13	Ret	35
10	(South Africa) Sheldon van der Linde	(Belgium) Belgian Audi Club Team WRT	7	12	12				Ret	34
10	(South Africa) Sheldon van der Linde	(Germany) Montaplast by Land-Motorsport				1	9	3		34
11	(United Kingdom) Adam Christodoulou	(France) Mercedes-AMG Team AKKA ASP		2	4					33
12	(Spain) Daniel Juncadella	(France) Mercedes-AMG Team AKKA ASP	11			15	3	6	2	33
13	(United Kingdom) Jake Dennis (Denmark) Nicki Thiim (France) Matthieu Vaxivière	(Switzerland) R-Motorsport	Ret	**1**	**31**	13	11	9	40	29
14	(France) Jules Gounon (United Kingdom) Steven Kane	(United Kingdom) Bentley Team M-Sport	24	21	2	11	5	25	21	29
14	(South Africa) Jordan Pepper	(United Kingdom) Bentley Team M-Sport			2	11	5	25	21	29
15	(United Kingdom) Alexander Sims	(Germany) Rowe Racing	Ret			7	6	2	8	29
16	(Switzerland) Jeffrey Schmidt	(Germany) Attempto Racing	13	22	Ret					28
16	(Switzerland) Jeffrey Schmidt	(Germany) Montaplast by Land-Motorsport				1	9	3		28
17	(Germany) Jens Klingmann	(Germany) Rowe Racing	Ret	13	11	7	6	2	9	27
17	(Netherlands) Nick Catsburg	(Germany) Rowe Racing	Ret			7	6	2	9	27
18	(Germany) Christopher Haase	(France) Saintéloc Racing	14	Ret	6				45	27
18	(Germany) Christopher Haase	(France) Audi Sport Team Saintéloc				16	4	4		27
18	(Germany) Markus Winkelhock	(France) Saintéloc Racing	27	35	6				24	27
18	(Germany) Markus Winkelhock	(France) Audi Sport Team Saintéloc				16	4	4		27
19	(Germany) Maximilian Buhk (Germany) Maximilian Götz	(United Kingdom) Strakka Racing	2	8	9					24
19	(Germany) Maximilian Buhk (Germany) Maximilian Götz	(United Kingdom) Mercedes-AMG Team Strakka Racing				21	12	11	17	24
20	(Russia) Mikhail Aleshin (Spain) Miguel Molina (Italy) Davide Rigon	(Russia) SMP Racing	**44**	7	33	22	14	10	3	23
21	(Switzerland) Alex Fontana (Canada) Mikaël Grenier (South Africa) Adrian Zaugg	(Switzerland) Emil Frey Jaguar Racing	5	44	16	29	35	28	4	22
22	(United Kingdom) Alex Buncombe (United Kingdom) Matt Parry	(United Kingdom) GT SPORT MOTUL Team RJN	42	16	5	9	8	7	23	21
22	(Spain) Lucas Ordóñez	(United Kingdom) GT SPORT MOTUL Team RJN	42	16	5	9	8	7		21
23	(Portugal) Álvaro Parente	(United Kingdom) Strakka Racing	2		9					20
23	(Portugal) Álvaro Parente	(United Kingdom) Mercedes-AMG Team Strakka Racing				21	12	11	17	20
24	(United Kingdom) Ben Barnicoat (France) Côme Ledogar	(United Kingdom) Garage 59	15	15	3	41	28	22	26	19
24	(United Kingdom) Andrew Watson	(United Kingdom) Garage 59	15	15	3	45	39	42	26	19
25	(Belgium) Frédéric Vervisch	(Belgium) Belgian Audi Club Team WRT			12					18
25	(Belgium) Frédéric Vervisch	(France) Audi Sport Team Saintéloc				16	4	4		18
26	(Monaco) Vincent Abril (Spain) Andy Soucek (Belgium) Maxime Soulet	(United Kingdom) Bentley Team M-Sport	43	14	36	3	32	Ret	5	17
27	(Monaco) Stéphane Ortelli (Finland) Markus Palttala (Austria) Norbert Siedler	(Switzerland) Emil Frey Lexus Racing	21	3	35	28	53	Ret	Ret	15
28	(Germany) Thomas Jäger	(United Kingdom) Strakka Racing		38						15
28	(Germany) Thomas Jäger	(France) Mercedes-AMG Team AKKA ASP			4					15
28	(Germany) Thomas Jäger	(Germany) SunEnergy1 Team HTP Motorsport				23	25	20		15
29	(Netherlands) Robin Frijns	(Belgium) Belgian Audi Club Team WRT	7						Ret	14
29	(Netherlands) Robin Frijns	(Belgium) Audi Sport Team WRT				6	10	8		14
30	(Italy) David Fumanelli	(United Kingdom) Strakka Racing	8	8	8	8	16	17		14
31	(Italy) Mirko Bortolotti (Italy) Andrea Caldarelli (Germany) Christian Engelhart	(Austria) GRT Grasser Racing Team	4	10	13	55	59	Ret	13	13
32	(Germany) Marvin Kirchhöfer (Belgium) Maxime Martin	(Switzerland) R-Motorsport	9	5	38	17	17	**35**	19	13
33	(Finland) Jesse Krohn	(Germany) Rowe Racing	Ret	13	Ret	2	55	Ret	8	13
34	(United Kingdom) Alex Brundle	(Switzerland) R-Motorsport	9	5	38					12
35	(Brazil) Felipe Fraga	(United Kingdom) Strakka Racing			8	57	58	Ret	7	10
36	(United Kingdom) Ricky Collard	(Germany) Rowe Racing	Ret	Ret	Ret	2	55	Ret		9
36	(Germany) Marco Wittmann	(Germany) Rowe Racing	Ret			2	55	Ret		9
37	(France) Simon Gachet	(France) Saintéloc Racing	14	Ret	6	63	63	Ret	45	9
38	(Italy) Raffaele Giammaria (Argentina) Ezequiel Pérez Companc	(Austria) GRT Grasser Racing Team	Ret	30	17	19	19	14	6	8
38	(Italy) Marco Mapelli	(Austria) GRT Grasser Racing Team	Ret		17	19	19	14	6	8
38	(Netherlands) Pieter Schothorst (Netherlands) Steijn Schothorst	(Germany) Attempto Racing	6	19	Ret	20	18	44	DNS	8
39	(Switzerland) Nico Müller (Germany) René Rast	(Belgium) Audi Sport Team WRT				6	10	8		8
40	(France) Adrien Tambay	(United Kingdom) Strakka Racing	8	38	8					8
41	(United Kingdom) Stuart Leonard	(Belgium) Belgian Audi Club Team WRT	7	12	12	60	60	Ret	Ret	6
41	(Russia) Denis Bulatov (United Kingdom) Michael Meadows	(Russia) SMP Racing by AKKA ASP	Ret	Ret	7	36	23	16	14	6
41	(Russia) Vitaly Petrov	(Russia) SMP Racing by AKKA ASP	Ret	Ret	7	36	23	16		6
41	(United Kingdom) Oliver Rowland	(United Kingdom) Strakka Racing		38					7	6
41	(Germany) Christian Vietoris	(United Kingdom) Strakka Racing				57	58	Ret	7	6
42	(Austria) Lucas Auer	(United Kingdom) Strakka Racing	8							4
43	(New Zealand) Earl Bamber (Germany) Timo Bernhard (Belgium) Laurens Vanthoor	(Germany) KÜS Team75 Bernhard				10	7	Ret		3
44	(United Kingdom) Chris Buncombe (United Kingdom) Nick Leventis (United Kingdom) Lewis Williamson	(United Kingdom) Strakka Racing	25	24	26	8	16	17	39	2
45	(France) Romain Dumas (France) Frédéric Makowiecki (Germany) Dirk Werner	(Germany) Manthey Racing	45	11	10	12	41	29	10	2
46	(Saudi Arabia) Abdulaziz Al Faisal (Germany) Hubert Haupt (Italy) Gabriele Piana	(Germany) Black Falcon	10	18	15	33	29	23	44	1
47	(Austria) Dominik Baumann	(Switzerland) R-Motorsport				17	17	**35**	19	1
	(Germany) Kim-Luis Schramm	(Germany) Attempto Racing			Ret	46	36	24	11	0
	(Austria) Clemens Schmid	(Germany) Attempto Racing				46	36	24	11	0
	(Australia) Chaz Mostert	(Germany) Rowe Racing			11					0
	(Denmark) Anders Fjordbach	(Germany) Attempto Racing							11	0
	(Switzerland) Edoardo Mortara (United Kingdom) Gary Paffett (Netherlands) Renger van der Zande	(Germany) Mercedes-AMG Team MANN-FILTER				27	13	12		0
	(Germany) Nico Bastian (United Kingdom) Jack Manchester (Netherlands) Jules Szymkowiak	(France) AKKA ASP Team	12	Ret	27	39	30	Ret	16	0
	(Italy) Alex Frassineti (France) Romain Monti (Italy) Andrea Rizzoli	(Italy) Ombra Racing	39	Ret	Ret	25	26	18	12	0
	(Switzerland) Marcel Fässler	(Belgium) Belgian Audi Club Team WRT		12		60	60	Ret		0
	(Germany) Pierre Kaffer	(Germany) Attempto Racing	13	22	Ret	46	36	24		0
	(Germany) Nicolas Pohler	(Germany) Attempto Racing	13	22						0
	(Germany) Nicolas Pohler	(Italy) Daiko Lazarus Racing				34	57	Ret		0
	(United States) Connor De Phillippi	(Germany) Rowe Racing		13						0
	(Switzerland) Rolf Ineichen (United Kingdom) Phil Keen (France) Franck Perera	(Austria) GRT Grasser Racing Team	20	17	39	14	27	Ret	Ret	0
	(Italy) Michele Beretta (Croatia) Martin Kodrić (United Kingdom) Sandy Mitchell	(United Kingdom) Barwell Motorsport	Ret	40	14	26	24	19	18	0
	(France) Antoine Jung	(France) Saintéloc Racing	14	Ret						0
	(Russia) Aleksey Korneev	(Russia) SMP Racing by AKKA ASP							14	0
	(Germany) Alexander Mattschull (Russia) Rinat Salikhov	(Germany) Rinaldi Racing	18	41	Ret	18	21	15	27	0
	(Germany) Daniel Keilwitz	(Germany) Rinaldi Racing		41		18	21	15	27	0
	(South Africa) David Perel	(Germany) Rinaldi Racing				18	21	15		0
	(Germany) Lennart Marioneck (Switzerland) Patric Niederhauser (Norway) Mads Siljehaug	(Germany) Reiter Young Stars	16	23	Ret				36	0
	(United Kingdom) Jamie Green	(Germany) Attempto Racing				20	18	44		0
	(China) Kang Ling	(Slovakia) ARC Bratislava	34							0
	(China) Kang Ling	(Italy) Ombra Racing				25	26	18		0
	(United Kingdom) Chris Goodwin (United Kingdom) Chris Harris (Sweden) Alexander West	(United Kingdom) Garage 59	Ret	25	18	45	39	42	37	0
	(Germany) Dominik Schwager	(Germany) Rinaldi Racing	18							0
	(Republic of Ireland) Charlie Eastwood (Oman) Ahmad Al Harthy (United Kingdom) Euan McKay	Oman Racing with TF Sport	19	39	19	61	61	Ret	22	0
	(Netherlands) Rik Breukers	(United Kingdom) Barwell Motorsport				26	24	19		0
	(United Kingdom) Duncan Cameron (Republic of Ireland) Matt Griffin	(Italy) AF Corse	30	26	20	35	33	21	25	0
	(Australia) Kenny Habul (Austria) Martin Konrad (Germany) Bernd Schneider	(Germany) SunEnergy1 Team HTP Motorsport				23	25	20		0
	(Italy) Fabrizio Crestani	(Italy) Daiko Lazarus Racing	40	27	32	34	57	Ret	20	0
	(Italy) Giuseppe Cipriani (Portugal) Miguel Ramos	(Italy) Daiko Lazarus Racing	40	27	32				20	0
	(United Kingdom) Euan Hankey (Turkey) Salih Yoluç	(United Kingdom) Ram Racing	DNS	20	37	54	50	33		0
	(United Kingdom) Darren Burke	(United Kingdom) Ram Racing		20	37	54	50	33		0
	(Italy) Gianluca de Lorenzi	(Italy) AF Corse			20					0
	(United Kingdom) Seb Morris (United Kingdom) Derek Pierce (United Kingdom) Rob Smith	(United Kingdom) Team Parker Racing	22	Ret	21	59	54	Ret	43	0
	(United Kingdom) Guy Smith	(United Kingdom) Bentley Team M-Sport	24	21						0
	(Italy) Lorenzo Bontempelli	(Switzerland) 961 Corse	28							0
	(Italy) Lorenzo Bontempelli	(Italy) AF Corse				35	33	21	25	0
	(United Kingdom) Aaron Scott	(Italy) AF Corse				35	33	21		0
	(Switzerland) Adrian Amstutz (Russia) Leo Machitski	(United Kingdom) Barwell Motorsport	33	42	22	32	34	27	29	0
	(France) Olivier Pla	(United Kingdom) Garage 59				41	28	22		0
	(Netherlands) Jeroen Bleekemolen (Germany) Marc Lieb (United States) Marc Miller (United States) Tim Pappas	(United States) Black Swan Racing				30	22	41		0
	(Portugal) Francisco Guedes	(United Kingdom) Barwell Motorsport	33		22					0
	(Italy) Andrea Bertolini (Netherlands) Niek Hommerson (Belgium) Louis Machiels	(Italy) AF Corse	23	43	Ret	40	37	26	Ret	0
	(Germany) Manuel Metzger	(Germany) Black Falcon				33	29	23		0
	(United Kingdom) Struan Moore (Mexico) Ricardo Sánchez	(United Kingdom) GT SPORT MOTUL Team RJN	Ret	29	23	44	38	37	42	0
	(United Kingdom) Jordan Witt	(United Kingdom) GT SPORT MOTUL Team RJN	Ret	29	23	44	38	37		0
	(United Kingdom) Jann Mardenborough	(United Kingdom) GT SPORT MOTUL Team RJN							23	0
	(France) Marc Rostan (France) Nyls Stievenart	(France) Saintéloc Racing	27	35	30	63	63	Ret	24	0
	(France) Fabien Barthez (France) Eric Debard	(France) AKKA ASP Team	32	31	24	62	62	Ret	33	0
	(Switzerland) Philippe Giauque	(France) AKKA ASP Team	32	31	24	62	62	Ret		0
	(Portugal) Rui Águas (Saudi Arabia) Saud Al Faisal (Greece) Kriton Lendoudis	(Germany) Black Falcon	29	28	25	48	45	31	35	0
	(Italy) Marco Cioci	(Italy) AF Corse				40	37	26		0
	(United Kingdom) Richard Abra	(United Kingdom) Barwell Motorsport				32	34	27	29	0
	(Finland) Patrick Kujala	(United Kingdom) Barwell Motorsport				32	34	27		0
	(France) Arno Santamato	(Italy) Daiko Lazarus Racing	31	34	Ret	34	57	Ret	28	0
	(Germany) Immanuel Vinke	(Germany) Walkenhorst Motorsport	41	36	28	51	46	38	34	0
	(Germany) Ralf Oeverhaus	(Germany) Walkenhorst Motorsport			28	51	46	38	34	0
	(Norway) Anders Buchardt	(Germany) Walkenhorst Motorsport	41		28	51	46	38		0
	(Lebanon) Alex Demirdjian (Italy) Giancarlo Fisichella	(Switzerland) 961 Corse	28							0
	(United Kingdom) Toby Sowery	(Italy) Daiko Lazarus Racing							28	0
	(Germany) Pierre Ehret (South Korea) Rick Yoon	(Germany) Rinaldi Racing	35	33	29	42	43	34	38	0
	(Finland) Rory Penttinen	(Germany) Rinaldi Racing	35	33	29				38	0
	(Finland) Rory Penttinen	(Germany) Attempto Racing				47	49	Ret		0
	(Italy) Stefano Costantini (France) Sylvain Debs (Belgium) Bernard Delhez (Italy) Alberto Di Folco	(Italy) Target Racing				38	40	30		0
	(Germany) Fabian Schiller	(France) AKKA ASP Team				39	30	Ret		0
	(Belgium) Christian Kelders	(France) Saintéloc Racing			30	63	63	Ret		0
	(Germany) Luca Ludwig	(Germany) Rinaldi Racing			Ret					0
	(Germany) Luca Ludwig	(Austria) HB Racing							30	0
	(Italy) Giovanni Venturini	(Austria) GRT Grasser Racing Team		30						0
	(Germany) Jens Liebhauser (Germany) Florian Scholze	(Austria) HB Racing							30	0
	(Belgium) Bertrand Baguette (France) Loïc Depailler (Argentina) Esteban Guerrieri (Italy) Riccardo Patrese	(Italy) Castrol Honda Racing				37	31	32		0
	(Italy) Stefano Gattuso	(Italy) Daiko Lazarus Racing	31	34	Ret	34	57	Ret		0
	(Italy) Federico Leo	(Italy) Daiko Lazarus Racing	31	34	Ret					0
	(Spain) Toni Forné (Germany) Frank Stippler	(Germany) Car Collection Motorsport	37		Ret				31	0
	(Germany) Dimitri Parhofer	(Germany) Car Collection Motorsport	37						31	0
	(United Kingdom) Tom Onslow-Cole	(Germany) Black Falcon				48	45	31		0
	(United Kingdom) Tom Onslow-Cole	(United Kingdom) Ram Racing							41	0
	(Germany) Edward Lewis Brauner (Germany) Jürgen Häring (Germany) Wolfgang Triller	(Germany) Herberth Motorsport	38	32	34	56	51	39	32	0
	(Sweden) Felix Rosenqvist	(United Kingdom) Ram Racing				54	50	33		0
	(Germany) Henry Walkenhorst	(Germany) Walkenhorst Motorsport	41	36		51	46	38	34	0
	(United States) Nicholas Boulle (Germany) Murad Sultanov	(Germany) Rinaldi Racing				42	43	34		0
	(Slovakia) Miroslav Konôpka (Poland) Andrzej Lewandowski	(Slovakia) ARC Bratislava	34							0
	(France) Nico Jamin	(France) AKKA ASP Team	36	37	Ret	62	62	Ret	Ret	0
	(France) Jean-Luc Beaubelique (Italy) Mauro Ricci	(France) AKKA ASP Team	36	37	Ret				Ret	0
	(Italy) Christian Colombo (Italy) Matteo Cressoni (Singapore) Gregory Teo (Indonesia) David Tjiptobiantoro	(Singapore) T2 Motorsports				53	47	36		0
	(Germany) Andreas Ziegler	(Germany) Walkenhorst Motorsport		36						0
	(United Kingdom) Sean Walkinshaw	(United Kingdom) GT SPORT MOTUL Team RJN				44	38	37		0
	(Germany) Alfred Renauer	(Germany) Herberth Motorsport				56	51	39		0
	(Netherlands) Remon Vos	(United Kingdom) Ram Racing							41	0
	(Italy) Giacomo Altoè (Italy) Gianluca Giraudi (United States) Juan Perez (Italy) Loris Spinelli	(Italy) Antonelli Motorsport				43	42	46		0
	(United Kingdom) Jon Minshaw	(United Kingdom) Barwell Motorsport		42						0
	(United Kingdom) Colin Noble	(United Kingdom) GT SPORT MOTUL Team RJN							42	0
	(Germany) Tobias Dauenhauer (Switzerland) Philipp Frommenwiler (Netherlands) Loris Hezemans (Switzerland) Nikolaj Rogivue	(Germany) Aust Motorsport				49	44	Ret		0
	(Belgium) Sam Dejonghe (Belgium) Nicolas Vandierendonck (Belgium) Tim Verbergt (Belgium) Koen Wauters	(Belgium) Brussels Racing				50	48	45		0
	(Switzerland) Ricardo Feller	(France) Saintéloc Racing							45	0
	(Germany) John-Louis Jasper (Switzerland) Jürgen Krebs (Switzerland) Tim Müller	(Germany) Attempto Racing				47	49	Ret		0
	(United Kingdom) Andy Meyrick	(United Kingdom) Team Parker Racing				59	54	Ret		0
	(Brazil) Rubens Barrichello	(United Kingdom) Strakka Racing				57	58	Ret		0
	(Brazil) Daniel Serra	(Belgium) Belgian Audi Club Team WRT				60	60	Ret		0
	(United Kingdom) Ross Gunn	Oman Racing with TF Sport				61	61	Ret		0
	(United Kingdom) Nick Yelloly	(Germany) Rowe Racing		Ret	Ret					
	(United States) John Edwards	(Germany) Rowe Racing		Ret						
	(Germany) Mike Hansch	(Germany) Car Collection Motorsport			Ret					
	(Poland) Michał Broniszewski (Italy) Alessandro Pier Guidi	(Switzerland) Kessel Racing	26^{1}						Ret	
	(Austria) Sven Heyrowsky	(Germany) Attempto Racing				DNS				
Drivers ineligible to score points
	(Belgium) Grégory Paisse (Belgium) Pierre-Yves Paque (France) Gilles Petit (Luxembourg) Bob Wilwert	(Belgium) SpeedLover				58	56	43		
	(Belgium) Sarah Bovy (Italy) Beniamino Caccia (Indonesia) Andrew Haryanto (Argentina) Andrés Josephsohn	(Italy) GDL Racing				52	52	47		
Pos.	Driver	Team	MNZ (Italy)	SIL (United Kingdom)	LEC (France)	6hrs	12hrs	24hrs	CAT (Spain)	Points
Pos.	Driver	Team	MNZ (Italy)	SIL (United Kingdom)	LEC (France)	SPA (Belgium)			CAT (Spain)	Points

Key
Colour	Result
Gold	Race winner
Silver	2nd place
Bronze	3rd place
Green	Points finish
Blue	Non-points finish
Blue	Non-classified finish (NC)
Purple	Did not finish (Ret)
Black	Disqualified (DSQ)
Black	Excluded (EX)
White	Did not start (DNS)
White	Race cancelled (C)
White	Withdrew (WD)
Blank	Did not participate

**Bold** – Pole
Italics – Fastest Lap

Notes

- ^{1} – The No. 11 Kessel Racing Ferrari remained in race results at Monza, but was considered invisible and ineligible for points in the Drivers' and Teams' championships. Alessandro Pier Guidi was forced to exceed his maximum driver time, due to an injury suffered by his co-driver Michał Broniszewski in the paddock.

==== Silver Cup ====
Pos.	Driver	Team	MNZ (Italy)	SIL (United Kingdom)	LEC (France)	SPA (Belgium)			CAT (Spain)	Points
Pos.	Driver	Team	MNZ (Italy)	SIL (United Kingdom)	LEC (France)	6hrs	12hrs	24hrs	CAT (Spain)	Points
1	(Switzerland) Alex Fontana (Canada) Mikaël Grenier (South Africa) Adrian Zaugg	(Switzerland) Emil Frey Jaguar Racing	**5**	**44**	**16**	**29**	35	28	4	103
2	(Saudi Arabia) Abdulaziz Al Faisal (Germany) Hubert Haupt (Italy) Gabriele Piana	(Germany) Black Falcon	10	18	15	33	29	23	44	97
3	(Italy) Michele Beretta (Croatia) Martin Kodrić (United Kingdom) Sandy Mitchell	(United Kingdom) Barwell Motorsport	Ret	40	14	26	24	19	18	92
4	(Italy) Alex Frassineti (France) Romain Monti (Italy) Andrea Rizzoli	(Italy) Ombra Racing	39	Ret	Ret	25	26	18	**12**	71
5	(Germany) Nico Bastian (United Kingdom) Jack Manchester (Netherlands) Jules Szymkowiak	(France) AKKA ASP Team	12	Ret	27	39	30	Ret	16	49
6	(United Kingdom) Struan Moore (Mexico) Ricardo Sánchez	(United Kingdom) GT SPORT MOTUL Team RJN	Ret	29	23	44	38	37	42	48
7	(Republic of Ireland) Charlie Eastwood (Oman) Ahmad Al Harthy (United Kingdom) Euan McKay	Oman Racing with TF Sport	19	39	19	61	61	Ret	22	47
8	(China) Kang Ling	(Italy) Ombra Racing				25	26	18		46
9	(United Kingdom) Jordan Witt	(United Kingdom) GT SPORT MOTUL Team RJN	Ret	29	23	44	38	37		44
10	(Netherlands) Rik Breukers	(United Kingdom) Barwell Motorsport				26	24	19		39
11	(Germany) Lennart Marioneck (Switzerland) Patric Niederhauser (Norway) Mads Siljehaug	(Germany) Reiter Young Stars	16	23	Ret				36	36
12	(France) Arno Santamato	(Italy) Daiko Lazarus Racing	31	34	Ret	34	57	Ret	28	35
13	(Germany) Manuel Metzger	(Germany) Black Falcon				33	29	23		28
14	(Italy) Stefano Gattuso	(Italy) Daiko Lazarus Racing	31	34	Ret	34	57	Ret		27
15	(Italy) Federico Leo	(Italy) Daiko Lazarus Racing	31	34	Ret					20
16	(United Kingdom) Sean Walkinshaw	(United Kingdom) GT SPORT MOTUL Team RJN				44	38	37		17
17	(Germany) Fabian Schiller	(France) AKKA ASP Team				39	30	Ret		10
18	(United Kingdom) Toby Sowery	(Italy) Daiko Lazarus Racing							28	8
19	(Italy) Fabrizio Crestani (Germany) Nicolas Pohler	(Italy) Daiko Lazarus Racing				34	57	Ret		7
20	(Germany) Tobias Dauenhauer (Switzerland) Philipp Frommenwiler (Netherlands) Loris Hezemans (Switzerland) Nikolaj Rogivue	(Germany) Aust Motorsport				49	44	Ret		5
21	(United Kingdom) Colin Noble	(United Kingdom) GT SPORT MOTUL Team RJN							42	4
22	(United Kingdom) Ross Gunn	Oman Racing with TF Sport				61	61	Ret		2
Pos.	Driver	Team	MNZ (Italy)	SIL (United Kingdom)	LEC (France)	6hrs	12hrs	24hrs	CAT (Spain)	Points
Pos.	Driver	Team	MNZ (Italy)	SIL (United Kingdom)	LEC (France)	SPA (Belgium)			CAT (Spain)	Points

==== Pro-Am Cup ====
Pos.	Driver	Team	MNZ (Italy)	SIL (United Kingdom)	LEC (France)	SPA (Belgium)			CAT (Spain)	Points
Pos.	Driver	Team	MNZ (Italy)	SIL (United Kingdom)	LEC (France)	6hrs	12hrs	24hrs	CAT (Spain)	Points
1	(United Kingdom) Chris Buncombe (United Kingdom) Nick Leventis (United Kingdom) Lewis Williamson	(United Kingdom) Strakka Racing	25	24	26	8	16	17	**39**	92
2	(United Kingdom) Duncan Cameron (Republic of Ireland) Matt Griffin	(Italy) AF Corse	30	26	20	35	33	21	25	89
3	(Germany) Alexander Mattschull (Russia) Rinat Salikhov	(Germany) Rinaldi Racing	18	**41**	Ret	18	21	15	27	85
4	(Germany) Daniel Keilwitz	(Germany) Rinaldi Racing		**41**		18	21	15	27	60
5	(Portugal) Rui Águas (Saudi Arabia) Saud Al Faisal (Greece) Kriton Lendoudis	(Germany) Black Falcon	29	28	25	48	45	31	35	51
6	(Italy) Giuseppe Cipriani (Italy) Fabrizio Crestani (Portugal) Miguel Ramos	(Italy) Daiko Lazarus Racing	40	27	32				20	49
7	(Italy) Lorenzo Bontempelli	(Switzerland) 961 Corse	28							45
7	(Italy) Lorenzo Bontempelli	(Italy) AF Corse				35	33	21	25	45
8	(South Africa) David Perel	(Germany) Rinaldi Racing				18	21	15		43
9	(United Kingdom) Seb Morris (United Kingdom) Derek Pierce (United Kingdom) Rob Smith	(United Kingdom) Team Parker Racing	22	Ret	21	59	54	Ret	43	43
10	(Italy) David Fumanelli	(United Kingdom) Strakka Racing				8	16	17		42
11	(United Kingdom) Euan Hankey (Turkey) Salih Yoluç	(United Kingdom) Ram Racing	DNS	20	**37**	**54**	50	33		40
11	(United Kingdom) Darren Burke	(United Kingdom) Ram Racing		20	**37**	**54**	50	33		40
12	(France) Marc Rostan (France) Nyls Stievenart (Germany) Markus Winkelhock	(France) Saintéloc Racing	27	35					24	36
13	(Italy) Gianluca de Lorenzi	(Italy) AF Corse			20					33
14	(Italy) Andrea Bertolini (Netherlands) Niek Hommerson (Belgium) Louis Machiels	(Italy) AF Corse	23	43	Ret	40	37	26	Ret	33
15	(Australia) Kenny Habul (Germany) Thomas Jäger (Austria) Martin Konrad (Germany) Bernd Schneider	(Germany) SunEnergy1 Team HTP Motorsport				23	25	20		28
16	(Germany) Dominik Schwager	(Germany) Rinaldi Racing	18							25
17	(United Kingdom) Aaron Scott	(Italy) AF Corse				35	33	21		21
18	(Italy) Marco Cioci	(Italy) AF Corse				40	37	26		16
19	(Netherlands) Jeroen Bleekemolen (Germany) Marc Lieb (United States) Marc Miller (United States) Tim Pappas	(United States) Black Swan Racing				30	22	41		15
20	(Belgium) Bertrand Baguette (France) Loïc Depailler (Argentina) Esteban Guerrieri (Italy) Riccardo Patrese	(Italy) Castrol Honda Racing				37	31	32		15
21	(United Kingdom) Tom Onslow-Cole	(Germany) Black Falcon				48	45	31		12
21	(United Kingdom) Tom Onslow-Cole	(United Kingdom) Ram Racing							41	12
22	(Germany) Luca Ludwig	(Germany) Rinaldi Racing			Ret					10
22	(Germany) Luca Ludwig	(Austria) HB Racing							30	10
22	(Germany) Jens Liebhauser (Germany) Florian Scholze	(Austria) HB Racing							30	10
23	(Spain) Toni Forné (Germany) Frank Stippler	(Germany) Car Collection Motorsport	37		Ret				31	8
23	(Germany) Dimitri Parhofer	(Germany) Car Collection Motorsport	37						31	8
23	(Lebanon) Alex Demirdjian (Italy) Giancarlo Fisichella	(Switzerland) 961 Corse	28							8
24	(France) Jean-Luc Beaubelique (France) Nico Jamin (Italy) Mauro Ricci	(France) AKKA ASP Team	36	37	Ret				Ret	7
25	(Sweden) Felix Rosenqvist	(United Kingdom) Ram Racing				**54**	50	33		5
26	(Italy) Giacomo Altoè (Italy) Gianluca Giraudi (United States) Juan Perez (Italy) Loris Spinelli	(Italy) Antonelli Motorsport				43	42	46		4
27	(Slovakia) Miroslav Konôpka (Poland) Andrzej Lewandowski (China) Kang Ling	(Slovakia) ARC Bratislava	34							2
27	(Netherlands) Remon Vos	(United Kingdom) Ram Racing							41	2
28	(Belgium) Sam Dejonghe (Belgium) Nicolas Vandierendonck (Belgium) Tim Verbergt (Belgium) Koen Wauters	(Belgium) Brussels Racing				50	48	45		1
29	(Poland) Michał Broniszewski (Italy) Alessandro Pier Guidi	(Switzerland) Kessel Racing	**26**^{1}						Ret	1
	(United Kingdom) Andy Meyrick	(United Kingdom) Team Parker Racing				59	54	Ret		0
	(Germany) Mike Hansch	(Germany) Car Collection Motorsport			Ret					
Pos.	Driver	Team	MNZ (Italy)	SIL (United Kingdom)	LEC (France)	6hrs	12hrs	24hrs	CAT (Spain)	Points
Pos.	Driver	Team	MNZ (Italy)	SIL (United Kingdom)	LEC (France)	SPA (Belgium)			CAT (Spain)	Points

Notes

- ^{1} – The No. 11 Kessel Racing Ferrari remained in race results at Monza, but was considered invisible and ineligible for points in the Drivers' and Teams' championships. Alessandro Pier Guidi was forced to exceed his maximum driver time, due to an injury suffered by his co-driver Michał Broniszewski in the paddock.

==== Am Cup ====
Pos.	Driver	Team	MNZ (Italy)	SIL (United Kingdom)	LEC (France)	SPA (Belgium)			CAT (Spain)	Points
Pos.	Driver	Team	MNZ (Italy)	SIL (United Kingdom)	LEC (France)	6hrs	12hrs	24hrs	CAT (Spain)	Points
1	(Switzerland) Adrian Amstutz (Russia) Leo Machitski	(United Kingdom) Barwell Motorsport	33	42	22	32	34	27	29	124
2	(United Kingdom) Chris Goodwin (United Kingdom) Chris Harris (Sweden) Alexander West	(United Kingdom) Garage 59	Ret	**25**	**18**	**45**	39	42	37	92
3	(France) Fabien Barthez (France) Eric Debard	(France) AKKA ASP Team	**32**	31	24	62	62	Ret	**33**	81
4	(Germany) Pierre Ehret (South Korea) Rick Yoon	(Germany) Rinaldi Racing	35	33	29	42	43	34	38	75
5	(United Kingdom) Richard Abra	(United Kingdom) Barwell Motorsport				32	34	27	29	74
6	(Germany) Immanuel Vinke	(Germany) Walkenhorst Motorsport	41	36	28	51	46	38	34	66
7	(Switzerland) Philippe Giauque	(France) AKKA ASP Team	**32**	31	24	62	62	Ret		65
8	(Germany) Edward Lewis Brauner (Germany) Jürgen Häring (Germany) Wolfgang Triller	(Germany) Herberth Motorsport	38	32	34	56	51	39	32	63
9	(Finland) Rory Penttinen	(Germany) Rinaldi Racing	35	33	29				38	56
9	(Finland) Rory Penttinen	(Germany) Attempto Racing				47	49	Ret		56
10	(Germany) Henry Walkenhorst	(Germany) Walkenhorst Motorsport	41	36		51	46	38	34	51
11	(Finland) Patrick Kujala	(United Kingdom) Barwell Motorsport				32	34	27		49
12	(Germany) Ralf Oeverhaus	(Germany) Walkenhorst Motorsport			28	51	46	38	34	46
13	(Norway) Anders Buchardt	(Germany) Walkenhorst Motorsport	41		28	51	46	38		44
14	(Portugal) Francisco Guedes	(United Kingdom) Barwell Motorsport	33		22					42
15	(Italy) Stefano Costantini (France) Sylvain Debs (Belgium) Bernard Delhez (Italy) Alberto Di Folco	(Italy) Target Racing				38	40	30		34
16	(United States) Nicholas Boulle (Germany) Murad Sultanov	(Germany) Rinaldi Racing				42	43	34		28
17	(United Kingdom) Andrew Watson	(United Kingdom) Garage 59				**45**	39	42		22
18	(Italy) Christian Colombo (Italy) Matteo Cressoni (Singapore) Gregory Teo (Indonesia) David Tjiptobiantoro	(Singapore) T2 Motorsports				53	47	36		19
19	(Germany) Alfred Renauer	(Germany) Herberth Motorsport				56	51	39		12
20	(Germany) Andreas Ziegler	(Germany) Walkenhorst Motorsport		36						10
21	(Belgium) Christian Kelders (France) Marc Rostan (France) Nyls Stievenart	(France) Saintéloc Racing			30	63	63	Ret		9
22	(United Kingdom) Jon Minshaw	(United Kingdom) Barwell Motorsport		42						8
23	(Germany) John-Louis Jasper (Switzerland) Jürgen Krebs (Switzerland) Tim Müller	(Germany) Attempto Racing				47	49	Ret		8
24	(France) Nico Jamin	(France) AKKA ASP Team				62	62	Ret		2
	(France) Simon Gachet	(France) Saintéloc Racing				63	63	Ret		0
	(Austria) Sven Heyrowsky	(Germany) Attempto Racing				DNS				
Pos.	Driver	Team	MNZ (Italy)	SIL (United Kingdom)	LEC (France)	6hrs	12hrs	24hrs	CAT (Spain)	Points
Pos.	Driver	Team	MNZ (Italy)	SIL (United Kingdom)	LEC (France)	SPA (Belgium)			CAT (Spain)	Points

=== Teams' championships ===
==== Overall ====
Pos.	Team	Manufacturer	MNZ (Italy)	SIL (United Kingdom)	LEC (France)	SPA (Belgium)			CAT (Spain)	Points
Pos.	Team	Manufacturer	MNZ (Italy)	SIL (United Kingdom)	LEC (France)	6hrs	12hrs	24hrs	CAT (Spain)	Points
1	(Germany) (Mercedes-AMG Team) Black Falcon	Mercedes-AMG	3	6	15	5	2	5	**1**	78
2	(France) (Mercedes-AMG Team) AKKA ASP (Russia) SMP Racing by AKKA ASP	Mercedes-AMG	11	2	4	15	3	6	2	72
3	(Switzerland) Emil Frey Jaguar/Lexus Racing	Jaguar; Lexus	5	3	1	28	20	13	4	70
4	(Belgium) Audi Sport/Belgian Audi Club Team WRT	Audi	1	4	12	6	10	8	15	51
5	(United Kingdom) Bentley Team M-Sport	Bentley	24	14	2	3	5	25	5	48
6	(Germany) Walkenhorst Motorsport	BMW	41	36	28	4	1	1	34	44
7	(Germany) Rowe Racing	BMW	Ret	13	11	2	6	2	8	41
8	(United Kingdom) (Mercedes-AMG Team) Strakka Racing	Mercedes-AMG	2	8	8	8	12	11	7	41
9	(Switzerland) R-Motorsport	Aston Martin	9	**1**	**31**	**13**	11	9	19	40
10	(France) (Audi Sport Team) Saintéloc Racing	Audi	14	35	6	16	4	4	24	32
11	(Russia) SMP Racing	Ferrari	**44**	7	33	22	14	10	3	26
12	(United Kingdom) GT SPORT MOTUL Team RJN	Nissan	42	16	5	9	8	7	23	26
13	(Austria) GRT Grasser Racing Team	Lamborghini	4	10	13	14	19	14	6	24
14	(United Kingdom) Garage 59	McLaren	15	15	3	41	28	22	26	20
15	(Germany) Manthey Racing	Porsche	45	11	10	12	41	29	10	10
16	(Germany) Attempto Racing	Audi; Lamborghini	6	19	Ret	20	18	24	11	9
	(Italy) Ombra Racing	Lamborghini	39	Ret	Ret	25	26	18	12	0
	(United Kingdom) Barwell Motorsport	Lamborghini	33	40	14	26	24	19	18	0
	(Germany) Rinaldi Racing	Ferrari	18	33	29	18	21	15	27	0
	(Germany) Reiter Young Stars	Lamborghini	16	23	Ret				36	0
	Oman Racing with TF Sport	Aston Martin	19	39	19	61	61	Ret	22	0
	(Switzerland) 961 Corse (Italy) AF Corse (Singapore) T2 Motorsports	Ferrari	23	26	20	35	33	21	25	0
	(Italy) Daiko Lazarus Racing	Lamborghini	31	27	32	34	57	Ret	20	0
	(United Kingdom) Ram Racing	Mercedes-AMG	DNS	20	37	54	50	33	41	0
	(United Kingdom) Team Parker Racing	Bentley	22	Ret	21	59	54	Ret	43	0
	(Austria) HB Racing	Ferrari							30	0
	(Germany) Car Collection Motorsport	Audi	37		Ret				31	0
	(Germany) Herberth Motorsport	Porsche	38	32	34	56	51	39	32	0
	(Slovakia) ARC Bratislava	Mercedes-AMG	34							0
	(Switzerland) Kessel Racing	Ferrari	26^{1}						Ret	
Teams ineligible to score points
	(Germany) Montaplast by Land-Motorsport	Audi				1	9	3		
	(Germany) KÜS Team75 Bernhard	Porsche				10	7	Ret		
	(Germany) Mercedes-AMG Team MANN-FILTER (Germany) SunEnergy1 Team HTP Motorsport	Mercedes-AMG				23	13	12		
	(United States) Black Swan Racing	Porsche				30	22	41		
	(Italy) Target Racing	Lamborghini				38	40	30		
	(Italy) Castrol Honda Racing	Honda				37	31	32		
	(Italy) Antonelli Motorsport	Lamborghini				43	42	46		
	(Belgium) SpeedLover	Porsche				58	56	43		
	(Germany) Aust Motorsport	Audi				49	44	Ret		
	(Belgium) Brussels Racing	Aston Martin				50	48	45		
	(Italy) GDL Racing	Lamborghini				52	52	47		
Pos.	Team	Manufacturer	MNZ (Italy)	SIL (United Kingdom)	LEC (France)	6hrs	12hrs	24hrs	CAT (Spain)	Points
Pos.	Team	Manufacturer	MNZ (Italy)	SIL (United Kingdom)	LEC (France)	SPA (Belgium)			CAT (Spain)	Points

Notes

- ^{1} – The No. 11 Kessel Racing Ferrari remained in race results at Monza, but was considered invisible and ineligible for points in the Drivers' and Teams' championships. Alessandro Pier Guidi was forced to exceed his maximum driver time, due to an injury suffered by his co-driver Michał Broniszewski in the paddock.

==== Pro-Am Cup ====
Pos.	Team	Manufacturer	MNZ (Italy)	SIL (United Kingdom)	LEC (France)	SPA (Belgium)			CAT (Spain)	Points
Pos.	Team	Manufacturer	MNZ (Italy)	SIL (United Kingdom)	LEC (France)	6hrs	12hrs	24hrs	CAT (Spain)	Points
1	(Switzerland) 961 Corse (Italy) AF Corse	Ferrari	23	26	20	35	33	21	25	107
2	(United Kingdom) Strakka Racing	Mercedes-AMG	25	24	26	8	16	17	**39**	92
3	(Germany) Rinaldi Racing	Ferrari	18	**41**	Ret	18	21	15	27	85
4	(Germany) Black Falcon	Mercedes-AMG	29	28	25	48	45	31	35	67
5	(United Kingdom) Ram Racing	Mercedes-AMG	DNS	20	**37**	**54**	50	33	41	58
6	(United Kingdom) Team Parker Racing	Bentley	22	Ret	21	59	54	Ret	43	51
7	(Italy) Daiko Lazarus Racing	Lamborghini	40	27	32				20	50
8	(France) Saintéloc Racing	Audi	27	35					24	36
9	(Austria) HB Racing	Ferrari							30	10
10	(Germany) Car Collection Motorsport	Audi	37		Ret				31	10
11	(France) AKKA ASP Team	Mercedes-AMG	36	37	Ret				Ret	10
12	(Slovakia) ARC Bratislava	Mercedes-AMG	34							6
13	(Switzerland) Kessel Racing	Ferrari	**26**^{1}						Ret	1
Teams ineligible to score points
	(Germany) SunEnergy1 Team HTP Motorsport	Mercedes-AMG				23	25	20		
	(United States) Black Swan Racing	Porsche				30	22	41		
	(Italy) Castrol Honda Racing	Honda				37	31	32		
	(Italy) Antonelli Motorsport	Lamborghini				43	42	46		
	(Belgium) Brussels Racing	Aston Martin				50	48	45		
Pos.	Team	Manufacturer	MNZ (Italy)	SIL (United Kingdom)	LEC (France)	6hrs	12hrs	24hrs	CAT (Spain)	Points
Pos.	Team	Manufacturer	MNZ (Italy)	SIL (United Kingdom)	LEC (France)	SPA (Belgium)			CAT (Spain)	Points

Notes

- ^{1} – The No. 11 Kessel Racing Ferrari remained in race results at Monza, but was considered invisible and ineligible for points in the Drivers' and Teams' championships. Alessandro Pier Guidi was forced to exceed his maximum driver time, due to an injury suffered by his co-driver Michał Broniszewski in the paddock.

==== Am Cup ====
Pos.	Team	Manufacturer	MNZ (Italy)	SIL (United Kingdom)	LEC (France)	SPA (Belgium)			CAT (Spain)	Points
Pos.	Team	Manufacturer	MNZ (Italy)	SIL (United Kingdom)	LEC (France)	6hrs	12hrs	24hrs	CAT (Spain)	Points
1	(United Kingdom) Barwell Motorsport	Lamborghini	33	42	22	32	34	27	29	124
2	(United Kingdom) Garage 59	McLaren	Ret	**25**	**18**	**45**	39	42	37	95
3	(France) AKKA ASP Team	Mercedes-AMG	**32**	31	24	62	62	Ret	**33**	83
4	(Germany) Rinaldi Racing	Ferrari	35	33	29	42	43	34	38	81
5	(Germany) Walkenhorst Motorsport	BMW	41	36	34	51	46	38	34	70
6	(Germany) Herberth Motorsport	Porsche	38	32	28	56	51	39	32	67
7	(Singapore) T2 Motorsports	Ferrari				53	47	36		24
8	(France) Saintéloc Racing	Audi			30	63	63	Ret		11
9	(Germany) Attempto Racing	Lamborghini				47	49	Ret		10
Teams ineligible to score points
	(Italy) Target Racing	Lamborghini				38	40	30		
Pos.	Team	Manufacturer	MNZ (Italy)	SIL (United Kingdom)	LEC (France)	6hrs	12hrs	24hrs	CAT (Spain)	Points
Pos.	Team	Manufacturer	MNZ (Italy)	SIL (United Kingdom)	LEC (France)	SPA (Belgium)			CAT (Spain)	Points

== See also ==
- 2018 Blancpain GT Series
- 2018 Blancpain GT Series Sprint Cup
- 2018 Blancpain GT Series Asia
