= Min Xu =

Min Xu (閔勗) (d. 886), courtesy name Gongjin (公謹), was a warlord late in the Chinese dynasty Tang dynasty, who controlled a substantial part, as well as Tan Prefecture (in modern Changsha, Hunan), the capital of Hunan Circuit (湖南), first as its governor (觀察使, Guanchashi) and then as the military governor (jiedushi), from 882 to 886. He was assassinated in 886.

== Background and takeover of Hunan region ==
Little is known about Min Xu's background, as neither of the official histories of the Tang dynasty (the Old Book of Tang and the New Book of Tang) contained a biography for him. It is known that he was originally an officer from Jiangxi Circuit (江西, headquartered in modern Nanchang, Jiangxi), whose soldiers were stationed at neighboring Hunan Circuit as of 881. Around the new year 882, when Min's assignment was apparently completed and he was set to return to Jiangxi with his soldiers, he went through Hunan's capital Tan Prefecture. While there, he expelled Hunan's governor Li Yu (李裕) and seized power himself, claiming the title of acting governor.

== Rule of Hunan and death ==
As of summer 882, the imperial government under then-reigning Emperor Xizong must have confirmed Min Xu's takeover, for he was referred to by that point as full governor. After being made governor, he made numerous requests for the post to be upgraded to the more prestigious position of military governor, but the imperial government rejected the overture, believing that granting Min's request would lead to other circuits not yet at military governor status making the requests. However, around the same time, the agrarian rebel leader Zhong Chuan, whom the imperial government had previously tried to enlist into the imperial camp by making him the prefect of Fu Prefecture (撫州, in modern Fuzhou, Jiangxi), had taken over Jiangxi's capital Hong Prefecture (洪州) and expelled Jiangxi's governor Gao Maoqing (高茂卿). The imperial government wanted to put Min and Zhong into conflict with each other, and therefore upgraded Jiangxi to Zhennan Circuit (鎮南) as a military governor post and commissioned Min as the military governor of Zhennan, ordering him to return to Zhennan to expel Zhong. Min, knowing the imperial government's intent, refused to launch his forces.

In fall 883, Emperor Xizong promoted Hunan to the military governor–level Qinhua Circuit and made Min its military governor.

In summer 886, Zhou Yue the prefect of Heng Prefecture (modern Hengyang in Hunan), formally a subordinate of Min's, attacked Tan Prefecture. At that time, Huang Hao (黃皓), one of the generals under Qin Zongquan, who had claimed imperial title at Cai Prefecture (蔡州, in modern Zhumadian, Henan), was in the region. Min, for reasons unclear to history, invited Huang into Tan Prefecture to assist in defending against Zhou's attack. Once Huang entered Tan Prefecture, however, he killed Min and seized control. Zhou, soon thereafter, captured Tan Prefecture and put Huang to death, taking over control of the circuit (which was then renamed Wu'an (武安)).
