= Qinhua Circuit =

Tang dynasty administrative district

Qinhua Circuit (traditional Chinese: 欽化軍; simplified Chinese: 钦化军; pinyin: Qīnhuàjūn) was a fangzhen (lit. 'region town') of China during the Tang dynasty. Its capital was Tanzhou (modern Changsha).

== History ==
Qinhua Circuit was a promotion of the earlier Hunan Circuit for Min Xu. Following his death and its expansion, it was later renamed the Wu'an Circuit.

== See also ==
- Tang dynasty
- Administration of territory in dynastic China
