= Wu'an Circuit =

Tang dynasty administrative district

Wu'an Circuit (traditional Chinese: 武安軍; simplified Chinese: 武安军; pinyin: Wǔ'ānjūn) was a fangzhen (lit. 'region town') of China during the Tang dynasty. It was formed by the expansion and renaming of the Qinhua Circuit.

== See also ==
- Tang dynasty
- Administration of territory in dynastic China
