= Fanzhen =

Tang Chinese system of military government

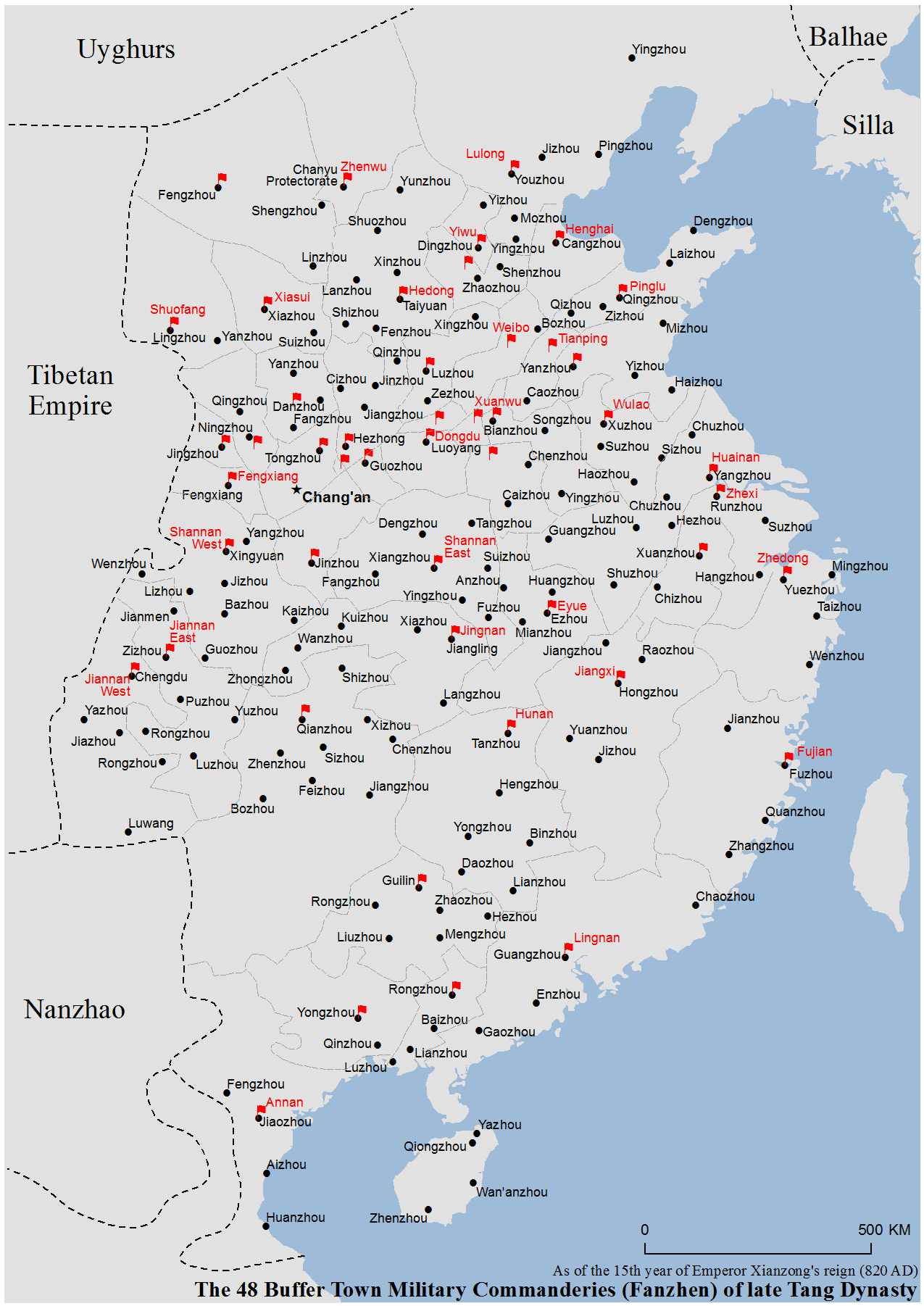
The 48 fanzhen (Military Districts under Buffer Towns) of late Tang dynasty, as of the 15th year of Emperor Xianzong's reign (820 CE).

Fanzhen (simplified Chinese: 藩镇; traditional Chinese: 藩鎮; pinyin: fānzhèn; lit. 'barrier town'), also called fangzhen (simplified Chinese: 方镇; traditional Chinese: 方鎮; lit. 'region town'), was a system of decentralized governance in Medieval China that involved strategic military districts and commanderies along the empire's borderland areas administered through highly autonomous regional governors known as jiedushi during the Tang dynasty (618–907 CE). Primarily designed to be buffer regions shielding the politically and economically vital heartlands, these districts came under the control of increasingly influential provincial military commissioners, who became ambitious warlords, rebels and even usurpers during the late Tang period. The phenomenon of fanzhen domination has been termed fanzhen geju (simplified Chinese: 藩镇割据; traditional Chinese: 藩鎮割據; pinyin: fānzhèn gējù; lit. "secessionist occupation of barrier towns") by historians.

Parallels have been made between the rise of the fanzhen in Tang China and the rise of self-ruling feudalist states in Medieval Europe following the decline of the Carolingian Empire.

== History ==
Precursors of fanzhen started at least as early as the Western Han dynasty, during which trusted members of the Liu royal family were given fiefs around the Guanzhong region, known as fanguo (Chinese: 藩国; lit. 'barrier state'), to guard strategic land corridors into the crownland. However, due to the Rebellion of the Seven States, since the reign of Emperor Wu the Han court started to replace the royal feudal lords with centrally sanctioned bureaucrats (who were selected via recommendations from local administrators) as regional governors. During the latter half of Eastern Han dynasty, prefectural governors and military leaders known as zhoumu (州牧) and taishou (太守) gained political power and autonomy, especially after long-running power struggles between consort kins and eunuchs significantly weakened the imperial court, causing the emperors to rely increasingly upon local administrators to help suppress growing grassroot insurgencies such as the Yellow Turban Rebellion. These regional prominence led to the rise of overambitious warlords such as Dong Zhuo, Yuan Shao, Cao Cao and Sun Ce, who allied and fought each other, eventually toppling the Han dynasty and led to the Three Kingdoms period. Such arrangement and circumstance of decentralization continued into the subsequent Jin and Sui dynasty, although the governance of key regions were given soly to centrally appointed officials instead of royalties, especially during the Tang dynasty, where examination- or merit-selected personnels were promoted into administrative positions in large numbers.

During the late reign of Emperor Xuanzong of Tang, control of the fanzhen devolved from central authority into the hands of long-term local officials and military leaders, who often passed down their position to kins and at times became clans powerful enough to overshadow the imperial court. The regional garrisons gradually turned into de facto private armies of regional governors, many of whom outright ignored central authority, particularly during and after the An Lushan Rebellion. An Lushan, the provincial governor-general of the Hebei and Shanxi prefectures who started the rebellion in 755 CE, went so far as to proclaim himself Emperor of the Yan dynasty in 756 CE and forced the Tang court to flee the capital Chang'an, but was usurped and killed in the following year by his own son, who was later overthrown and killed by his general Shi Siming. Tang loyalists eventually defeated the Yan rebellion by 763 CE, but the chaos allowed many more jiedushi on the periphery of the Tang Empire to gain significant autonomy with many becoming warlords in all but name. Subsequent Tang emperors were met with lukewarm success in curtailing the power of these fanzhen, in particular, the Emperor Dezong (r. 779–805 CE) who was driven from the capital after an unsuccessful attempt to subjugate them. The subsequent Emperor Xianzong (r. 805–820 CE) was able to suppress some fanzhen but at the cost of further empowering the eunuchs who had come to dominate the life of the imperial court. Xianzong died in 820 CE, possibly as a result of assassination, and his successors were unable to stop the dynasty's decline. The ambitions of the jiedushi, in tandem with the corruption of the imperial court eunuchs who dominated the central civil administration and even attained high military command during the late Tang, contributed to the disintegration of the Tang Empire. A brief resurgence under the emperors Wuzong and Xuānzong failed to halt the decentralization of state power, and the Tang Empire decayed further following a further series of major peasant uprisings such as the Wang Xianzhi and Huang Chao rebellions, eventually collapsing in 907 CE after a military governor named Zhu Wen (who was a defected commander from the Huang Chao Rebellion) murdered the last emperior of Tang and usurped the throne.

After the collapse of the Tang dynasty, fanzhen that did not wish to submit to the new Later Liang dynasty declared independence, thereby forming several of the Ten Kingdoms during the chaotic Five Dynasties and Ten Kingdoms period. The Song dynasty, which arose out of a military coup in Later Zhou and were thus fearful of repeating the chaos of its preceding dynasties, overcorrected by emphasizing royal guards and oppressing any prominent borderland commanders, even when threatened by hostile foreign states such as Liao, Western Xia, Jin and Mongol.

== See also ==
- Three Fanzhen of Hebei
