= Tan Prefecture (Hunan) =

Historical administrative division in Hunan, China

Tanzhou or Tan Prefecture (潭州) was a zhou (prefecture) in imperial China centering on modern Changsha, Hunan, China. In the Yuan dynasty it was known as Tanzhou Route (潭州路) and in the Ming dynasty as Tanzhou Fu (潭州府). It existed (intermittently) from 589 to 1372.

== Geography ==
The administrative region of Tanzhou in the Tang dynasty falls within modern eastern Hunan. It probably includes modern:

- Under the administration of Changsha:
  - Changsha
  - Liuyang
  - Changsha County
  - Ningxiang
- Under the administration of Zhuzhou:
  - Zhuzhou
  - Zhuzhou County
  - Liling
- Under the administration of Xiangtan:
  - Xiangtan
  - Xiangxiang
  - Xiangtan County
- Under the administration of Yiyang:
  - Yiyang
