= Zhao Huang =

Zhao Huang (趙鍠) (died 889) was a warlord late in the Chinese Tang dynasty, who ruled Xuanshe Circuit (宣歙, headquartered in modern Xuancheng, Anhui) as its governor (觀察使, Guanchashi) from 887 to his death at the hands of rival Yang Xingmi in 889.

== Background ==
Little is known about Zhao Huang's background, as there was no biography of his in either of the official histories of Tang, the Old Book of Tang and the New Book of Tang. What was known that he, at an early age, formed a friendship with Zhu Wen — who would later be a major warlord.

As of 887, Zhao was the prefect of Chi Prefecture (池州, in modern Chizhou, Anhui), which belonged to Xuanshe Circuit, when the much larger Huainan Circuit (淮南, headquartered in modern Yangzhou, Jiangsu), ruled by the military governor (Jiedushi) Gao Pian, fell into internecine warfare between Gao's favorite sorcerer Lü Yongzhi and Gao's officer Bi Shiduo. Bi, who put Huainan's capital Yang Prefecture (揚州) under siege but was unable to capture it quickly, decided to seek aid from Qin Yan the governor of Xuanshe, offering the Huainan military governorship to Qin if they could jointly prevail. Before Qin's forces arrived, however, Yang Prefecture fell to Bi. Bi nevertheless still offered the military governorship to Qin, who went to Yang Prefecture to assume the post. Qin made Zhao the acting governor of Xuanshe to replace him.

== Rule of Xuanshe Circuit ==
Qin Yan and Bi Shiduo, however, were then defeated by the joint forces of Yang Xingmi the prefect of Lu Prefecture (廬州, in modern Hefei, Anhui) and Lü Yongzhi. They fled Yang Prefecture and joined forces with Sun Ru, but Sun subsequently executed them, leaving Zhao Huang without an ally to the north. In 888, Sun defeated Yang Xingmi, causing Yang to flee back to Lu Prefecture. Yang was fearful that Sun would attack him there, too, and pondered an attack against Zhong Chuan the military governor of Zhennan Circuit (鎮南, headquartered in modern Nanchang, Jiangxi) to try to take over Zhennan. Yang's strategist Yuan Xi (袁襲), however, convinced him that Zhao was an easier target — as, according to Yuan, Zhao had not ruled the circuit for long and had governed it violently and arbitrarily, causing his soldiers to be alienated. Yuan further suggested that Yang persuade Sun Duan (孫端) the prefect of He Prefecture (和州, in modern Chaohu, Anhui) and Zhang Xiong, who ruled Shangyuan (上元, in modern Nanjing, Jiangsu), to attack Zhao first, and then attack Zhao when Zhao was concentrating on repelling Zhao and Zhang. Yang agreed.

Yang was able to persuade Sun and Zhang to attack Zhao, and Zhao initially was able to repel their attacks. Yang took this opportunity to attack Zhao's officers Sun Tang (孫塘) and Qi Lang (漆朗) at Mount He (曷山, in modern Xuancheng); after he defeated them, he put Xuanshe's capital Xuan Prefecture under siege. Zhao Huang's older brother Zhao Qianzhi (趙乾之) was then the prefect of Chi Prefecture, and he tried to come to Zhao Huang's aid, but Yang's officer Tao Ya (陶雅) defeated Zhao Qianzhi, forcing Zhao Qianzhi to flee to Zhennan, leaving Zhao Huang without aid.

By summer 889, Xuan Prefecture was so desperate for food under Yang's siege that people had resorted to cannibalism. Zhao's officer Zhou Jinsi (周進思) then expelled Zhao. Zhao tried to flee to Yang Prefecture to join Sun Ru, but was captured in flight by Yang Xingmi's officer Tian Jun. Subsequently, Zhou himself was arrested by other officers, who surrendered Xuan Prefecture to Yang.

After Yang took Zhao captive, Zhu Wen, who by that point was the military governor of Xuanwu Circuit (宣武, headquartered in modern Kaifeng, Henan) and one of the most powerful warlords of the Tang realm, sent an emissary to Yang, asking for Yang to deliver Zhao to him. Yang consulted Yuan, who instead advocating executing Zhao and then delivering his head to Zhu. Yang did so.

== Notes and references ==
- Zizhi Tongjian, vols. 257, 258.
