= Zhang Xiong =

Chinese military general and politician

Zhang Xiong (張雄) (d. September 18, 893) was a Chinese military general and politician during the Tang dynasty. He from 886 and on, controlled an army that initially roved in the lower Yangtze River region and became a key player in the power struggles between various warlords for the control of Huainan (淮南, headquartered in modern Yangzhou, Jiangsu) and Zhenhai (鎮海, headquartered in modern Zhenjiang, Jiangsu) Circuits. Zhang eventually settled in at Shangyuan (上元, in modern Nanjing, Jiangsu) in 887 and controlled the area until his death in 893.

== Background ==
Zhang Xiong was originally from Lianshui (漣水, in modern Huai'an, Jiangsu), and he served as an officer at Ganhua Circuit (感化, headquartered in modern Xuzhou, Jiangsu), which Lianshui belonged to. Once, when fellow officer Feng Hongduo, who was also from Lianshui, was accused of impropriety by circuit administrators, Zhang spoke on his behalf, and Zhang's doing so caused Ganhua's military governor (jiedushi) Shi Pu to suspect both of them. In 886, knowing that Shi suspected them, Zhang and Feng gathered 300 men and left Ganhua with them, crossing the Yangtze River to attack Su Prefecture (蘇州, in modern Suzhou, Jiangsu), which then belonged to Zhenhai Circuit. They captured it, and Zhang claimed the title of prefect. Eventually, he was able to gather an army reaching the size of 50,000, with 1,000 ships, and called his army Tiancheng Army (天成軍).

== Roving campaigns ==
Zhang Xiong's occupation of Su Prefecture drew the displeasure and apprehension of Zhenhai's military governor Zhou Bao. As Zhou had heard that Xu Yue (徐約), an officer under Zhou's rival Gao Pian the military governor of Huainan, had a strong army, he induced Xu to attack Su Prefecture, promising to give the prefecture to him if Xu were successful. In summer 887, Xu attacked Zhang; Zhang was unable to withstand the attack, and he took his army east out to the East China Sea. He sent his officer Zhao Hui (趙暉) with part of the army and part of the fleet west on the Yangtze to take over Shangyuan, and Zhao was able to do so.

Meanwhile, Huainan's capital Yang Prefecture (揚州) had become embroiled in internecine warfare, as the officer Bi Shiduo, fearful that Gao's trusted sorcerer Lü Yongzhi was about to kill him, mutinied and captured Yang Prefecture, taking Gao under his control. Zhang used this opportunity to approach it, stopping his army at Dongtang (東塘, in modern Yangzhou), near Yang Prefecture. Subsequently, war again erupted between Bi and his ally Qin Yan the governor (觀察使, Guanchashi) of Xuanshe Circuit (宣歙, headquartered in modern Xuancheng, Anhui) (whom Bi offered the military governorship of Huainan to) and Yang Xingmi the prefect of Lu Prefecture (廬州, in modern Hefei, Anhui), who put Yang Prefecture under siege. Qin and Bi wanted Zhang's aid, as they were running low on food supplies, and they exchanged the wealths of the city for food supplies from Zhang. However, Zhang's army, after they received the wealths of the city, refused to engage in battle on Qin's and Bi's behalf. Thereafter, Yang Xingmi captured the city, and Qin and Bi fled. They initially tried to join Zhang, but Zhang refused to receive them, and they instead joined forces with Qin Zongheng (秦宗衡), the brother of Qin Zongquan, who had proclaimed himself emperor at Fengguo Circuit (奉國, headquartered in modern Zhumadian, Henan). (Qin Zongheng was subsequently assassinated by his lieutenant Sun Ru, who then executed Qin Yan and Bi, defeated Yang Xingmi, and took over Yang Prefecture.)

Meanwhile, with Zhou having himself lost control of Zhenhai Circuit in a mutiny, many of Zhou's soldiers fled to Zhao. Zhao thus became arrogant, and he rebuilt Tai Castle (臺城), a major defense mechanism for Jiankang, the ancient capital of the Southern Dynasties, as his residence, and began to live luxuriously. He also stopped communicating with Zhang. When Zhang left Dongtang and advanced west on the Yangtze, Zhao further tried to stop him. In anger, Zhang attacked Shangyuan and captured it. Zhao fled but was killed by his own subordinates. Zhang killed all of Zhao's soldiers who surrendered, and settled in at Shangyuan.

== Control of Shangyuan ==
Meanwhile, Yang Xingmi had returned to Lu Prefecture and was plotting to attack Zhao Huang the governor of Xuanshe (whom Qin Yan had left in charge of Xuanshe when he left to contend for control of Huainan). Yang persuaded Zhang Xiong and Sun Duan (孫端) the prefect of He Prefecture (和州, in modern Chaohu, Anhui) to first attack Zhao, forcing Zhao to engage them. While Zhao was able to defeat Zhang and Sun, Yang then himself attacked Zhao and defeated him, eventually capturing his capital Xuan Prefecture (宣州) and taking over Xuanshe as its governor.

In 890, then-reigning Emperor Zhaozong established a new Sheng Prefecture (昇州) at Shangyuan and made Zhang its prefect. Zhang died in 893, and Feng Hongduo succeeded him as prefect. It was said that Zhang's soldiers missed him for his leadership skills, and they built a temple to worship him.

== Notes and references ==
- New Book of Tang, vol. 190.
- Zizhi Tongjian, vols. 256, 257, 258, 259.
