= Tian Jun =

Chinese military general, politician and warlord

Tian Jun (Chinese: 田頵; 858 – December 30, 903), courtesy name Dechen (德臣), was a Chinese military general, politician, and warlord during the late medieval Tang dynasty, who ruled Ningguo Circuit (寧國, headquartered in modern Xuancheng, Anhui) at its military governor (jiedushi) from 892 to his death in 903. He was a childhood friend of the major warlord Yang Xingmi the military governor of Huainan Circuit (淮南, headquartered in modern Yangzhou, Jiangsu), served under Yang during various campaigns, and continued to be Yang's vassal after he became a military governor. However, he eventually became angry at Yang's refusal to support him in his own campaigns of expansion. In 903, he rebelled against Yang in conjunction with An Renyi (安仁義) the military prefect of Run Prefecture (潤州, in modern Zhenjiang, Jiangsu) and, for some time, posed a major threat to Yang's continued rule of Huainan, but was soon defeated by Yang's officer Tai Meng (臺濛) and killed in battle.

== Background ==
Tian Jun was born in 858, during the reign of Emperor Xuanzong. He was from Lu Prefecture (廬州, in modern Hefei, Anhui), and, in his youth, established a deep friendship with Yang Xingmi, such that they agreed to become blood brothers. He was said to be somewhat capable at reading and understanding written works, and was said to be calm and ambitious. At one point, he became a soldier in the Lu Prefecture militia, and gradually became an officer.

== Initial service under Yang Xingmi ==
In 884, by which time Yang Xingmin had become the prefect of Lu Prefecture, under Gao Pian the military governor of Huainan Circuit, Qin Zongquan, a rebel general then ruling Fengguo Circuit (奉國, headquartered in modern Zhumadian, Henan), sent his brother to attack Lu Prefecture. Yang sent Tian to repel the attack, and Tian did so.

In 886, Zhang Ao (張翱) the prefect of Shou Prefecture (壽州, in modern Lu'an, Anhui) sent his officer Wei Qian (魏虔) to attack Lu Prefecture. Yang sent Tian, Li Shenfu, and Zhang Xun (張訓) to resist Wei. Together, they defeated Wei at Chucheng (褚城, in modern Hefei). (Also in 886, at Gao's order, Yang changed his name from Xingmin to Xingmi.)

In 887, with Gao's favorite sorcerer Lü Yongzhi controlling the governance of Huainan, an officer who feared Lü would kill him, Bi Shiduo, rose in rebellion against Gao/Lü. Bi and his ally Qin Yan the governor (觀察使, Guanchashi) of Xuanshe Circuit (宣歙, i.e., the circuit that would eventually become Ningguo) were able to capture Huainan's capital Yang Prefecture (揚州); Lü fled, while Qin, who claimed the title of military governor of Huainan, and Bi put Gao under house arrest (and later executed him). At Lü's summons, Yang Xingmi arrived at Yang Prefecture, joining forces with Lü; they, in turn, defeated Qin and Bi, who fled. Yang Xingmi claimed the title of acting military governor of Huainan. After the victory, Yang Xingmi arrested Lü (under the reason that Lü had promised silver to Yang Xingmi's soldiers but failed to deliver) and had Tian interrogate him; under Tian's interrogation, Lü admitted to a plot that he had wanted to murder Gao and replace Gao as the military governor of Huainan; as a result, Lü was executed.

However, soon thereafter, with Qin Zongquan's general Sun Ru arriving in the vicinity to try to fight for control over Huainan, Yang Xingmi vacated Yang Prefecture and returned to Lu Prefecture. In 889, he attacked Xuanshe Circuit, which Qin Yan had left for his officer Zhao Huang to govern. When Zhao fled during a flood—believing that the floodwaters would protect him from pursuing Lu soldiers—it was Tian who got on a light vessel, chased him down, and captured him. Yang was able to take over Xuanshe and became its governor (and later, military governor, with the circuit renamed to Ningguo).

Thereafter, Yang sent Tian to attack Chang Prefecture (常州, in modern Changzhou, Jiangsu), which was then under the control of Du Leng (杜稜), a follower of Qian Liu the prefect of Hang Prefecture (杭州, in modern Hangzhou, Zhejiang). Tian put Chang Prefecture under siege and dug a tunnel into the city, catching Du by surprise and capturing both him and the city. However, late in 889, Sun attacked Chang Prefecture and expelled Tian, leaving it in control of Sun's subordinate Liu Jianfeng.

In 891, Sun launched a major assault on Xuanshe, intending to destroy Yang. His initial attacks were very successful, as he defeated Tian and An Renyi, advancing all the way to Xuanshe's capital Xuan Prefecture (宣州). However, his army became bogged down in the siege and ran out of food supplies, forcing Sun to send Liu and Ma Yin out of his camp to pillage for food. Further, Sun himself was suffering from malaria at the time. Yang used the opportunity to launch a major counterstrike. His forces defeated Sun's, and Tian captured Sun and executed him on the battlefield. In the aftermaths of the battle, Sun's remnants coalesced under Liu and Ma and fled south, while Yang advanced back to Yang Prefecture and again took it over. Subsequently, the imperial government commissioned Yang as the military governor of Huainan, and, at Yang's request, made Tian the acting military governor of Ningguo and An the prefect of Run Prefecture.

== As military governor of Ningguo ==
It was said that Tian Jun was good at governing his territory; he was also lenient and promoted commerce, and was loved by his people. He was also said to be welcoming to those with knowledge, and such individuals as Yang Kui (楊夔), Kang Peng (康軿), Xiahou Shu (夏侯淑), Yin Wengui (殷文圭), and Wang Xiyu (王希羽) became his guests. Yin, in particular, had an excellent reputation, and had been invited by both Qian Liu and the major warlord Zhu Quanzhong the military governor of Xuanwu Circuit (宣武, headquartered in modern Kaifeng, Henan) to join them, but had refused them both. Tian took a different tack, by finding a country estate and welcoming Yin's mother to the estate to live, treating her as an aunt, so Yin thereafter served Tian faithfully.

While by this point Tian had a separate command, he continued to be a vassal of Yang Xingmi's. For example, when Yang and Li Shenfu attacked Lu Prefecture (which was then ruled by Yang's former subordinate Cai Chou (蔡儔), who had rebelled against Yang) in 893, Tian brought his forces to join the battle. Later in the year, also at Yang's order, he attacked She Prefecture (歙州, in modern Huangshan, Anhui), eventually getting She's prefect Pei Shu to surrender the prefecture to Yang's officer Tao Ya (陶雅).

In 895, by which point Tian was referred to as full military governor of Ningguo, Qian, who then carried the title of military governor of Zhenhai Circuit (鎮海, headquartered at Hang Prefecture by that point), was attacking Qian's former superior Dong Chang the military governor of Weisheng Circuit (威勝, headquartered in modern Shaoxing, Zhejiang), under the reason that Dong had rebelled against the emperor by claiming imperial title himself earlier in the year. Dong sought aid from Yang, and Yang sent Tian and An Renyi (whose title had been promoted to military prefect (團練使, Tuanlianshi) by that point) to attack Hang Prefecture to try to divert Qian's attention. Their efforts (and the efforts of other Huainan officers), however, were unsuccessful, and by 896, Qian had defeated and killed Dong.

In 897, when the Huainan officer Wei Yue (魏約) was sieging the Zhenhai city of Jiaxing (嘉興, in modern Jiaxing, Zhejiang), Tian was providing Wei support by stationing at nearby Yiting Dam (驛亭埭). However, the Zhenhai officer Gu Quanwu (顧全武) defeated Wei and captured him, and then also attacked Tian. Tian, hearing that Wei had been captured, withdrew, but still suffered more than 1,000 casualties.

In 899, Wang Tan (王檀) the prefect of Wu Prefecture (婺州, in modern Jinhua, Zhejiang), a former follower of Sun Ru's, was under siege by Zhenhai forces under Wang Qiu (王球), and he sought aid from Tian. Tian sent his officer Kang Ru (康儒) to aid Wang Tan. Kang subsequently was able to defeat and capture Wang Qiu, and then take over Wu Prefecture.

Meanwhile, wedged between Huainan and Ningguo remained an independent warlord—Feng Hongduo, who then ruled Sheng Prefecture (昇州, in modern Nanjing, Jiangsu) but who claimed the title of military governor of Wuning Circuit (武寧, headquartered in modern Xuzhou, Jiangsu) remotely—whose territory was small but whose military might was based on his having a powerful fleet of large ships, known as the "tower ships" (樓船), at one point allowing him to threaten Yang with attack if Yang refused to yield Run Prefecture to him. Tian planned to attack him, and therefore began to build a fleet of his own. He hired the same shipbuilders who built Feng's fleet, and when the shipbuilders pointed out that Feng used the best wood possible to build durable ships (and that Ningguo lacked such wood), Tian responded that he only planned to use his fleet once. Quickly, his fleet was built. Feng, realizing Tian's intentions, decided to act preemptively, and in 902 he attacked Ningguo, despite Yang's attempts to dissuade Feng from attacking. Tian defeated him, and he then surrendered to Yang. After Feng's defeat, Tian went to Yang Prefecture to thank Yang Xingmi, and also to request that Chi (池州, in modern Chizhou, Anhui) and She Prefectures, which previously were a part of Xuanshe Circuit, be given to him. Yang refused. Tian was further aggravated by the fact that the attendants around Yang, including jailers, demanded bribes from Tian—stating, in anger, "Is it that the jailer knows that I am about to be imprisoned?" As he left Yang Prefecture, he vowed never to visit it again.

Later in 902, Tian had another opportunity to expand his territory. That year, Qian was faced with a major mutiny by his officers Xu Wan and Xu Zaisi (許再思), whose forces were able to capture the outer parts of Hang Prefecture and force Qian to hold his defense within the inner city. Xu Wan and Xu Zaisi were unable to capture the inner city, and therefore requested aid from Tian. Tian thus arrived at Hang Prefecture. His suggestion to Qian—that Qian evacuate Hang Prefecture and retain Dong's old capital of Yue Prefecture (越州)—was summarily rejected by Qian, so he put Hang's inner city under siege. Meanwhile, Qian, at Gu's suggestion, sent Gu and his son Qian Chuanliao (錢傳璙) to Huainan to seek Yang's help in forcing Tian to withdraw, arguing to Yang that if Tian took over Zhenhai, his strength would be so much increased that he would become a threat to Yang. Yang, after retaining Qian Chuanliao as a hostage (and giving a daughter to Qian Chuanliao in marriage), agreed. He sent orders to Tian to withdraw, under the threat that if Tian did not, he would send someone else to govern Ningguo. Tian, after extracting a cash payment from Qian and forcing Qian to surrender a son (Qian Chuanguan) as a hostage (with Tian giving a daughter to Qian Chuanguan in marriage), withdrew, taking Xu Wan and Xu Zaisi with him. It was said that after this incident, he further resented Yang for holding back on his expansion plans, which he had wanted to carry out because, at that time, he felt he had a strong army and plenty of monetary resources to finance the campaigns.

== Rebellion against Yang Xingmi and death ==
Tian Jun thus considered rebelling against Yang Xingmi, and he reached agreements with An Renyi and Yang's brother-in-law Zhu Yanshou, who then carried the title of military governor of Fengguo and was stationed at Shou Prefecture, to rise against Yang together. However, Tian's plans were hastened when Yang promoted Kang Ru to be the prefect of Lu Prefecture—which led Tian to believe that Kang had betrayed him and therefore slaughter Kang and his whole family. He then rose simultaneously with An. (Zhu was initially set to rise against Yang as well, but Yang, realizing that Zhu was in contact with Tian and An, instead, pretending to his wife (Zhu's sister) Lady Zhu that he was going blind and was ready to entrust Huainan to Zhu, summoned Zhu back to Yang Prefecture. Zhu believed in the order after Lady Zhu confirmed it, and therefore went to Yang Prefecture, where Yang executed him and his brothers and then divorced Lady Zhu.) He also sent messengers to Zhu Quanzhong, offering to be a vassal; Zhu Quanzhong was pleased, and dispatched an army to Su Prefecture (宿州, in modern Suzhou, Anhui) to prepare to aid Tian.

Tian quickly captured Sheng Prefecture and took Li Shenfu's family captive. He tried to use them as hostage to force Li to join his rebellion, but Li, who had been attacking Du Hong the military governor of Wuchang Circuit (武昌, headquartered in modern Wuhan, Hubei) under Yang's orders, rejected his overture; instead, Li quickly lifted the siege against Du and headed back east to engage Tian. Tian initially sent Wang Tan and Wang Jian (汪建) to face Li, but Li defeated them at Jiyang Rock (吉陽磯, in modern Chizhou) and then again at Wankou (皖口, in modern Anqing, Anhui). Hearing of Wang Tan's and Wang Jian's defeats, Tian decided to take his remaining fleet, head upstream on the Yangtze River, and engage Li himself. Meanwhile, Yang sent Tai Meng and Wang Maozhang to attack Ningguo from the northeast.

Hearing that Tai was about to arrive in Ningguo, Tian changed plans and headed back downstream to engage Tai, while leaving Guo Xingcong (郭行悰), along with Wang Tan and Wang Jian, at Wuhu (蕪湖, in modern Wuhu, Anhui), to defend against Li's advance. Tian and Tai engaged each other at Guangde (廣德, in modern Xuancheng), but Tai distributed letters from Yang to Tian's officers, causing Tian's army's morale to fail. Tai then defeated Tian at Guangde, and then against at Huangchi (黃池, in modern Wuhu). Tian fled back to Xuan Prefecture and took up defense, with Tai then putting Xuan Prefecture under siege. Tian tried to summon the army stationed at Wuhu to return to aid him, but, after Tai repelled them, Guo, Wang Tan, and Wang Jian, as well as the officers that Tian stationed at Dangtu (當塗, in modern Ma'anshan, Anhui) and Guangde, all surrendered to Tai. With Tai sieging Xuan Prefecture, Yang then diverted Wang Maozhang's forces back to Run Prefecture to attack An.

Late in 903, Tian took several hundred soldiers and tried to launch a surprise attack on Tai's camp. Tai pretended to withdraw, and as Tian chased after him, Tai struck back. Tian tried to flee back into the city, but his path was cut off; he fell off his horse, and was then decapitated. Tian's soldiers continued to fight Tai's soldiers, until Tai showed Tian's head to them, at which point they disbanded, allowing Tai to capture Xuan Prefecture. When Tian's head was delivered to Yang, Yang wept, and buried Tian with the ceremony for a common citizen. Yang spared Tian's mother Lady Yin, whom he continued to honor as if she were an honored family member. Meanwhile, Qian Chuanguan returned to Qian Liu's domain, along with Tian's brother-in-law Guo Shicong (郭師從, the brother of Tian's wife Lady Guo), who, along with Lady Yin, had protected Qian Chuanguan from Tian's wrath during the sequence of defeats (during which Tian contemplated executing Qian Chuanguan), although it is not recorded what the fates of Tian's daughter or other family members were.

== Notes and references ==
- New Book of Tang, vol. 189.
- History of the Five Dynasties, vol. 17.
- Spring and Autumn Annals of the Ten Kingdoms, vol. 13.
