= Liu Jianfeng (Tang dynasty) =

Chinese military general and politician

Liu Jianfeng (Chinese: 劉建鋒; died May 17, 896), courtesy name Ruiduan (銳端), was a Chinese military general and politician during the Tang dynasty. He controlled Wu'an Circuit (武安, headquartered in modern Changsha, Hunan) from 894 to his death in 896.

== Background ==
It is not known when Liu Jianfeng was born, but it is known that he was from Langshan (朗山, in modern Zhumadian, Henan). At some point, he became an officer at Zhongwu Circuit (忠武, headquartered in modern Xuchang, Henan) and was stationed at Cai Prefecture (蔡州, in modern Zhumadian), which Langshan belonged to, as part of the effort to resist the major agrarian rebel Huang Chao, serving alongside his Zhongwu Circuit colleague Sun Ru, and both served under Qin Zongquan the military governor of Fengguo Circuit (奉國, headquartered at Cai Prefecture). They continued to serve under Qin after Qin had rebelled against the rule of Emperor Xizong and declared himself emperor.

== Service under Sun Ru ==
In 886, Qin Zongquan put Sun Ru in command of an army to attack Tang's Heyang Circuit (河陽, headquartered in modern Jiaozuo, Henan); Sun prevailed over the acting military governor of Heyang, Zhuge Zhongfang (諸葛仲方), and took over the circuit. Despite the victory, Zhang Ji (張佶), who also served under Sun, secretly stated to Liu Jianfeng, "Lord Qin is harsh and paranoid, and will soon be destroyed. We have to find a way to avoid this fate ourselves." Liu, who saw the wisdom in Zhang's words, befriended him.

Sun subsequently withdrew from Heyang after Qin suffered a major defeat at the hands of Zhu Quanzhong the Tang military governor of Xuanwu Circuit (宣武, headquartered in modern Kaifeng, Henan). Later in the year, Qin sent his brother Qin Zongheng (秦宗衡), with Sun as his deputy, to advance into Huainan Circuit (淮南, headquartered in modern Yangzhou, Jiangsu), to contend for control of the circuit, which by that point had fallen into an internecine struggle between Qin Yan and Bi Shiduo on one side, and Yang Xingmi on the other. Liu, Zhang, and Ma Yin were all in this army commanded by Qin Zongheng. When they arrived at Huainan's capital Yang Prefecture (揚州), Yang Xingmi had captured it and forced Qin Yan and Bi to flee. Qin Yan and Bi then joined forces with Qin Zongheng as well. Soon thereafter, when Qin Zongquan, himself facing military pressure from Zhu, tried to recall Qin Zongheng's army, Sun assassinated Qin Zongheng and took over the army, thereafter executing Qin Yan and Bi. Sun soon defeated Yang Xingmi and took over Yang Prefecture, claiming the title of military governor of Huainan. (Yang subsequently took Ningguo Circuit (寧國, headquartered in modern Xuanzhou, Anhui and became its military governor.) In 889, Sun had Liu attack and capture Chang (常州, in modern Changzhou, Jiangsu) and Run (潤州, in modern Zhenjiang, Jiangsu) from Yang Xingmi's subordinate Tian Jun and Cheng Ji (成及), a subordinate of Qian Liu (who then controlled Hang Prefecture (杭州, in modern Hangzhou, Zhejiang), respectively. In 890, by which time Chang Prefecture had again been taken by Yang Xingmi and was defended by Yang Xingmi's subordinate Zhang Xingzhou (張行周), Liu again captured it and killed Zhang, and then put Su Prefecture (蘇州, in modern Suzhou, Jiangsu), then under the control of Yang Xingmi's subordinate Li You (李友), under siege. Sun subsequently captured Su Prefecture himself and killed Li.

In spring 891, Sun launched the initial phase of an ambitious plan to first destroy Yang Xingmi and then Zhu. He took all of the army available to him and headed for Xuanshe's capital Xuan Prefecture (宣州). Liu was part of Sun's army. Sun's army was initially victorious, and by spring 892 had put Xuan Prefecture under siege. However, Sun was unable to capture Xuan, and soon got bogged down, with Yang sending raiders to cut off his food supplies. Further, his army was soon troubled by torrential floods and illnesses, and Sun himself was suffering from malaria. He was forced to send Liu and Ma out to raid the nearby regions for food. Meanwhile, Yang, hearing that Sun was suffering from malaria, attacked. He crushed Sun's army and killed Sun. Most of Sun's soldiers surrendered to Yang. Liu and Ma took 7,000 soldiers and headed south, toward Zhennan Circuit (鎮南, headquartered in modern Nanchang, Jiangsi); the soldiers supported Liu as their leader, with Ma as his forward commander and Zhang Ji as his strategist. The army's size eventually ballooned to over 100,000.

== Seizure of Wu'an Circuit ==
Instead of attacking Zhennan Circuit, Liu Jianfeng's army continued to head southwest, toward Wu'an Circuit, which was then ruled by Deng Chuna. When Liu reached Liling (醴陵, in modern Zhuzhou, Hunan) in summer 894, Deng sent his subordinates Jiang Xun (蔣勛) and Deng Jichong (鄧繼崇) to defend Longhui Pass (龍回關, in modern Shaoyang, Hunan) against Liu's advance. Ma Yin advanced to the pass and sent a messenger to Jiang and Deng Jichong. The messenger persuaded Jiang and Deng Jichong that Liu's arrival was foretold by the stars and that their army would be unable to resist his. At the suggestion of the messenger, Jiang and Deng Jichong disbanded their army. Liu then had his soldiers put on the uniforms that Jiang's and Deng Jichong's army wore, and then quickly advanced to Wu'an's capital Tan Prefecture (in modern Changsha, Hunan). When they arrived there, the Tan Prefecture's defenders mistook them for Jiang's and Deng Jichong's army, and therefore took no precautions. Liu's army directly headed for the headquarters, where Deng Chuna was holding a feast. They captured Deng Chuna, and Liu executed him and claimed the title of acting military governor. In summer 895, then-reigning Emperor Zhaozong commissioned Liu as the military governor of Wu'an.

== Death ==
In winter 895, after Jiang Xun's request to be the prefect of Shao Prefecture (邵州, in modern Shaoyang) was rebuffed by Liu Jianfeng, he and Deng Jichong rose to oppose Liu. They quickly captured Shao Prefecture and tried to pressure Tan Prefecture. In spring 896, Liu sent Ma Yin to attack Jiang and Deng, and Ma had initial successes.

However, while this campaign was still going on, it was said that Liu had become arrogant and alcoholic after he took over the circuit. He also carried on an affair with the beautiful wife of his officer Chen Shan (陳赡). Chen, angry, used a hammer to assassinate Liu. The soldiers initially supported Zhang Ji to succeed Liu, but Zhang declined and eventually supported Ma.

== Notes and references ==
- New Book of Tang, vol. 190.
- Zizhi Tongjian, vols. 256, 257, 258, 259, 260.
