= Xu Wan =

- Traditional Chinese: 徐綰
- Simplified Chinese: 徐绾
Transcriptions
Standard Mandarin
- Hanyu Pinyin: Xú Wǎn

Xu Wan (died 902) was a general during the late Tang dynasty who served and later turned against the warlord Qian Liu.

== Early life ==
Xu Wan initially followed warlord Sun Ru, but after Sun Ru was destroyed by warlord Yang Xingmi in 892, Xu Wan took many of his soldiers east to join warlord Qian Liu.

== Rebellion ==
In fall 902, Xu along with Xu Zaisi (許再思) rebelled against Qian, put Qian's home base Hang Prefecture under siege, and with the support of opportunist warlord Tian Jun almost destroyed Qian. Qian had to send a son to rival warlord Yang Xingmi as hostage in exchange for military assistance. Yang agreed, and Yang's general Li Shenfu defeated and captured Xu. Xu was delivered to Qian, who executed him.
