= Liu Jianfeng =

Liu Jianfeng may refer to:

- Liu Jianfeng (Tang dynasty) (劉建鋒; died 896), Tang dynasty warlord
- Liu Jianfeng (PRC) (刘剑锋; born 1936), PRC Governor of Hainan
