= Feng Hongduo =

Feng Hongduo (馮弘鐸) was a warlord late in the Chinese Tang dynasty, who controlled the Sheng Prefecture (昇州, in modern Nanjing, Jiangsu) region from 893 to 902.

== Background ==
Feng Hongduo was originally from Lianshui (漣水, in modern Huai'an, Jiangsu), and he served as an officer at Ganhua Circuit (感化, headquartered in modern Xuzhou, Jiangsu), which Lianshui belonged to. Once, when Feng was accused of impropriety by circuit administrators, fellow officer Zhang Xiong, who was also from Lianshui, spoke on his behalf, and Zhang's doing so caused Ganhua's military governor (jiedushi) Shi Pu to suspect both of them. In 886, knowing that Shi suspected them, Zhang and Feng gathered 300 men and left Ganhua with them, crossing the Yangtze River to attack Su Prefecture (蘇州, in modern Suzhou, Jiangsu), which then belonged to Zhenhai Circuit. They captured it, and Zhang claimed the title of prefect. Eventually, he was able to gather an army reaching the size of 50,000, with 1,000 ships, and called his army Tiancheng Army (天成軍).

== Service under Zhang Xiong ==
Zhang Xiong was eventually dislodged from Su Prefecture by Xu Yue (徐約) and roved down the Yangtze River to East China Sea and then back up the Yangtze; Feng followed him. Zhang eventually settled in at Shangyuan (上元, in modern Nanjing, Jiangsu), and was given the title of prefect of a new Sheng Prefecture, with its seat at Shangyuan, by then-reigning Emperor Zhaozong. After Zhang's death in 893, Feng succeeded him as the prefect of Sheng.

== As ruler of Sheng Prefecture ==
It was said that Feng Hongduo, as the prefect of Sheng, was capable in riding and archery, and was also a good speaker, speaking as if he were a learned Confucian scholar. He also possessed the strongest fleet of the region, constructed from good, durable wood that he obtained from afar; the ships were massive and known as "tower ships" (樓船). He made peace with Yang Xingmi, who by that point had taken control of Huainan. However, at one point, he sent his follower Shang Gongnai (尚公乃) to Yang, demanding that Yang turn over control of Run Prefecture (潤州, in modern Zhenjiang, Jiangsu) to him. When Yang refused, Shang made the comment to Yang, "Lord, you reject our demand, but can you withstand the tower ship fleet?" Still, it appeared that no major conflict between Yang and Feng resulted from this incident.

In 902, Emperor Zhaozong, who was then under the controls of the eunuch Han Quanhui and the warlord Li Maozhen at Li Maozhen's Fengxiang Circuit (鳳翔, headquartered in modern Baoji, Shaanxi), which was then under siege by another major warlord, Zhu Quanzhong the military governor of Xuanwu Circuit (宣武, headquartered in modern Kaifeng, Henan), sent the imperial emissary Li Yan to the southeastern circuits to encourage the warlords there to join under Yang's command and attack Zhu. As part of the edicts that Li Yan promulgated, Feng was given the title of military governor of Wuning (武寧, i.e., Ganhua).

Meanwhile, by this point, Feng had felt trapped between Yang and Yang's vassal, Tian Jun the military governor of Ningguo Circuit (寧國, headquartered in modern Xuancheng, Anhui), but as he felt that he could depend on his tower ship fleet, he did not join the Huainan power bloc. Tian decided to try to conquer Feng's territory, so he hired the shipbuilders who had previously built Feng's ships to build ships for him, despite those shipbuilders' objections that Tian's territory lacked the type of wood that Feng used and therefore resultant ships would not be as durable. (Tian's response to them was, "Just build them; all I need to do is to use them once.") Tian thus quickly had a fleet built, ready to engage Tian.

Feng realized Tian's intentions, and his subordinates Feng Hui (馮暉) and Yan Jian (顏建) suggested that he attack Tian first. He therefore activated his fleet and headed southwest on the Yangtze, claiming to be readying to attack Zhong Chuan the military governor of Zhennan Circuit (鎮南, headquartered in modern Nanchang, Jiangxi), but was instead intending to attack Tian. When Yang sent emissaries to try to stop him from attacking Tian, he refused to listen. However, when he engaged Tian's fleet at Geshan (葛山, in modern Xuancheng), Tian dealt him a major defeat.

Having been defeated by Tian, Feng Hongduo gathered the remnants of his fleet and planned to head down the Yangtze to East China Sea. Yang was concerned that he might be able to rebuild his forces and become a threat later, and therefore sent messengers to assure him that if he submitted, he and his army would be well-treated. Feng's army wanted to accept the offer, and when Yang, unarmed, thereafter went to Dongtang (東塘, in modern Yangzhou) to meet Feng, Feng and his army was impressed, and therefore joined Yang's army at Huainan. Yang made him the deputy military governor of Huainan. He thereafter served Yang without failure. That was the last historical record on Feng, and it is not known when he died.

== Notes and references ==
- Spring and Autumn Annals of the Ten Kingdoms (十國春秋), vol. 8.
- New Book of Tang, vol. 190.
- Zizhi Tongjian, vols. 256, 257, 259, 263.
