= Sun Ru =

Chinese military general and politician

Sun Ru (Chinese: 孫儒; died July 3, 892), formally the Prince of Le'an (樂安王), was a Chinese military general, rebel and politician during the Tang dynasty. He initially served as a general under the pretender emperor Qin Zongquan. After Qin's defeat, he nominally submitted to Tang imperial authority and contended for control of the central-lower Yangtze River region with Yang Xingmi; he was eventually defeated by Yang and executed. His subordinate Ma Yin was the eventual founder of the Five Dynasties and Ten Kingdoms period state Chu.

== Background and service under Qin Zongquan ==
It is not known when Sun Ru was born. His family was from Henan County, one of the two counties making up the Tang dynasty eastern capital Luoyang. At some point, he became a low-level officer at Zhongwu Circuit (忠武, headquartered in modern Xuchang, Henan), where he befriended fellow officer Liu Jianfeng. Later, during the rebellion by the major agrarian rebel Huang Chao, Sun served under the command of Qin Zongquan.

By 884, Huang had been defeated and killed, but Qin, who then controlled Fengguo Circuit (奉國, headquartered in modern Zhumadian, Henan) as its military governor (Jiedushi), then became a rebel himself against Emperor Xizong of Tang. As of late 884, Qin was sending a number of his officers to attack or seize territory around his. As part of Qin's campaigns, Sun seized Luoyang, Meng Prefecture (孟州, in modern Jiaozuo, Henan), Shan Prefecture (陝州, in modern Sanmenxia, Henan), and Guo Prefecture (虢州, in modern Sanmenxia). In summer 885, however, he was again battling the Tang defender of Luoyang, Li Hanzhi, for control of Luoyang. It was said that while Li initially abandoned Luoyang after running out of food supplies, Sun only occupied Luoyang for about a month, before burning the palaces, government offices, and houses, and leaving Luoyang after plundering it, allowing Li to again occupy Luoyang.

In late 886, Qin sent Sun to capture Zheng Prefecture (鄭州, in modern Zhengzhou, Henan), and Sun did so, forcing the Tang prefect of Zheng, Li Fan (李璠), to flee to Daliang (大梁, in modern Kaifeng, Henan), then under control of the Tang general Zhu Quanzhong. Sun then attacked and seized Heyang (河陽, in modern Luoyang), forcing the acting military governor of Heyang, Zhuge Zhongfang (諸葛仲方), to flee to Daliang as well. Sun claimed the title of military governor of Heyang, but Tang generals Zhang Quanyi and Li, in alliance with each other, stationed themselves at Huai Prefecture (懷州, in modern Jiaozuo, Henan) and Ze Prefecture (澤州, in modern Jincheng, Shanxi), respectively, and continued to resist Sun.

In summer 887, Qin gathered his forces and made an attempt to destroy Zhu once and for all, but was defeated by Zhu and his allies Zhu Xuan and Zhu Jin. Upon hearing of Qin's defeat, most of the officers he sent to the various surrounding regions abandoned their posts and fled. Sun also abandoned Heyang, and it was said that he slaughtered its people and burned its houses. Heyang Circuit came under the joint control of Li and Zhang.

== Seizure of Yang Prefecture ==
In fall 887, with Huainan Circuit (淮南, headquartered in modern Yangzhou, Jiangsu) recently thrown into a state of confusion and war due to internecine battles between the military governor Gao Pian and Gao's officers Lü Yongzhi, Qin Yan, Yang Xingmi, and Bi Shiduo, among others, which resulted in a Yang Xingmi victory but the capital Yang Prefecture (揚州) and surrounding regions being laid waste, Qin Zongquan sent his brother Qin Zongheng (秦宗衡) and Sun Ru southeast to try to wrest the control of Huainan from Yang Xingmi. (Serving under them were, among others, Liu Jianfeng, Zhang Ji (張佶), Ma Yin, and Qin Zongquan's cousin Qin Yanhui (秦彥暉). They quickly advanced on Yang Prefecture and seized the food supplies that Yang Xingmi had brought to Yang Prefecture during his recent siege against Qin Yan and Bi, and they put Yang Prefecture under siege. However, with Qin Zongquan recently having been defeated by Zhu Quanzhong, Qin Zongheng was ordered by Qin Zongquan to return to Cai Prefecture to aid Qin Zongquan and tried to do so. Sun, believing that Qin Zongquan was nearing defeat, refused to do so. Upon further orders by Qin Zongheng to prepare to do so, Sun killed him and took over the army. Qin Zongheng's officer An Renyi (安仁義), instead of submitting to Sun, surrendered to Yang Xingmi.

Sun invited Qin Yan and Bi to join his army, and they did so. Together, they attacked and seized Gaoyou (高郵, in modern Yangzhou), forcing Yang Xingmi's ally Zhang Shenjian (張神劍) to flee to Yang Xingmi. However, Sun then began to strip Qin Yan and Bi of their troops, in spring 888, Sun, believing in accusations that Qin Yan's and Bi's subordinate Tang Hong (唐宏) laid against them that they were in communications with Zhu and were encouraging him to attack Sun, killed Qin Yan and Bi. Meanwhile, Yang Xingmi, believing that he could not contend with Sun for control of Yang Prefecture at this point, began to evacuate his own troops back to his original base at Lu Prefecture (廬州, in modern Hefei, Anhui), and when Sun finally attacked Yang Prefecture in summer 888, he captured it fairly easily as Yang Xingmi fled. Sun thereafter claimed the title of military governor of Huainan.

== Subsequent campaign against Yang Xingmi, defeat, and death ==
Yang Xingmi, instead of returning to Lu Prefecture, captured Xuan Prefecture (宣州, in modern Xuancheng, Anhui), the capital of Xuanshe Circuit (宣歙); he was subsequently named the governor (觀察使, Guanchashi) of Xuanshe by then-emperor Emperor Zhaozong (Emperor Xizong's younger brother and successor). As he was doing so, Sun Ru attacked Lu Prefecture, and Yang's subordinate Cai Chou (蔡儔), whom Yang left in charge of Lu, surrendered it. Meanwhile, in late 889, Zhu Quanzhong, who had been named the military governor of Huainan by the imperial government in addition to the circuits that he already held, sent his officer Pang Shigu (龐師古) to attack Huainan, but after Sun defeated him in spring 890 at Lingting (陵亭, in modern Taizhou, Jiangsu), Pang withdrew. Still, fearing a joint attack by Zhu and Yang, Sun sought peaceful relations with Zhu, and Zhu initially agreed; at Zhu's recommendation, Emperor Zhaozong named Sun the military governor of Huainan, but soon thereafter, Zhu broke off the relations and killed Sun's emissaries.

At this time, Yang still held some of prefectures southeast of Yang Prefecture—Chang (常州, in modern Changzhou, Jiangsu), Run (潤州, in modern Zhenjiang, Jiangsu), and Su (蘇州, in modern Suzhou, Jiangsu). In fall 890, Sun, while himself attacking Run Prefecture, had Liu Jianfeng capture Chang Prefecture, killing Yang's subordinate Zhang Xingzhou (張行周). Around the new year 891, Sun further took Su Prefecture and killed Yang's subordinate Li You (李友). Upon hearing that Su had fallen, An Renyi, whom Yang had put in charge of Run Prefecture, abandoned it, and Sun took control of the region.

In spring 891, Sun continued to pursue his campaign against Yang, pushing closer to Xuan Prefecture and defeating Yang's forces under An and Tian Jun multiple times, although his advances were briefly thwarted by Li Shenfu. Sun advanced to Huangchi (黃池, in modern Wuhu, Anhui), and Yang's forces, under Liu Wei (劉威) and Yang's brother-in-law Zhu Yanshou, were defeated when they tried to attack Sun there. However, in summer 891, floods greatly damaged Sun's camp, and Sun withdrew back to Yang Prefecture. However, he sent his officers Kang Wang (康暀) and An Jingsi (安景思) to seize He (和州, in modern Chaohu, Anhui) and Chu (滁洲, in modern Chuzhou, Anhui) Prefectures, respectively. However, Li Shenfu soon counterattacked and recaptured those prefectures.

Meanwhile, as Sun had previously feared, Zhu Quanzhong and Yang Xingmi entered into a pact against him, but by this point, encouraged by his own battlefield successes, he decided to pool his forces together and destroy Yang first before heading back north to face Zhu, so he burned Yang Prefecture, forced the adults to cross the Yangtze River south, and slaughtered the old and the young, while taking all of his troops and again headed toward Xuan Prefecture. Yang Xingmi, whose officers Zhang Xun (張訓) and Li Decheng then entered and took Yang Prefecture, tried to intercept him at Guangde (廣德, in modern Xuancheng), but Sun surrounded Yang's camp and put it under siege; only through the efforts of Yang's officer Li Jian (李簡) was Yang able to fight out of the siege. Meanwhile, another warlord, Qian Liu, then in control of the Hang Prefecture (杭州, in modern Hangzhou, Zhejiang) region, seized Su Prefecture and sent food aid to Yang. Yang, nevertheless, in fear of Sun's much larger army, considered abandoning Xuan in spring 892. At Liu Wei's and Li Shenfu's urging that doing so would mean disaster and that he should wear Sun's forces out by defending Xuan, he remained at Xuan and defended it. Further, at the suggestion of Dai Yougui (戴友規), Yang sent the refugees from Yang Prefecture back to Yang Prefecture, hoping that if they settled back in, the news would destroy the morale among Sun's soldiers by making them miss Yang Prefecture.

Sun put Xuan Prefecture under siege, but with all of his forces at Xuan, Yang's officers retook Chang and Run Prefectures. Yang then repeatedly defeated Sun in battles, while Zhang Xun cut off Sun's food supply routes. Sun was forced to send out some of his forces, under Liu Jianfeng and Ma Yin, to pillage the surrounding areas for food. In summer 892, after Sun contracted malaria and Yang received news of this, Yang decided to make one decisive raid against Sun's camp. On July 3, with it raining hard at the time and the sky dark, Yang launched his attack, crushing Sun's forces. Tian captured Sun, and Yang beheaded Sun and sent his head to the imperial capital Chang'an. Liu Jianfeng and Ma, hearing of the defeat, took the remnants and fled south to Hong Prefecture (洪州, in modern Nanchang, Jiangxi), allowing Yang to take control of the entire Huainan region. Years later, after Ma eventually took control of the Hunan region, he petitioned the imperial government to posthumously honor Sun and create Sun the Prince of Le'an. He also built a temple dedicated to Sun.

== Notes and references ==
- New Book of Tang, vol. 188.
- Zizhi Tongjian, vols. 256, 257, 258, 259.
