= Pang Shigu =

Chinese warlord during Tang Dynasty

- Born: Unknown, mid 800s
- Died: 897 AD, Qingkou
- Occupation: General

Pang Shigu
- Traditional Chinese: 龐師古
- Simplified Chinese: 庞师古
Transcriptions
Standard Mandarin
- Hanyu Pinyin: Páng Shīgǔ
- Wade–Giles: Pʻang Shih-ku

Pang Shigu, né Pang Cong (庞从), was a general of the warlord Zhu Wen (future emperor Taizu of Later Liang) in the period preceding the collapse of the Tang Dynasty of China.

Pang first distinguished himself during Zhu Wen's campaigns against the rebels Huang Chao and later Qin Zongquan. Following this, he gained more important positions and eventually shared the leadership of a full army with general Ge Congzhou. He successfully defeated and killed Shi Pu, governor of Ganhua and a powerful enemy of Zhu Wen. However, when given command of an invasion of the territory of warlord Yang Xingmi he was defeated and killed by Yang at the Battle of Qingkou.
