= Yang Xingmi =

Prince of Wu from 902 to 905

Yang Xingmi 楊行密
- Prince of Wu

Prince of Wu (吳王)
- Reign: 902 – 905
- Predecessor: Proclaimed the Prince of Wu
- Successor: Yang Wo as Commandery Prince of Hongnong

Commandery Prince of Hongnong (弘農郡王)
- Reign: 895 – 902
- Successor: Proclaimed the Prince of Wu

jiedushi of Huainan Circuit (淮南節度使)
- Tenure: 887 – 888
- Predecessor: Qin Yan
- Successor: Sun Ru
- Tenure: 892 – 905
- Predecessor: Sun Ru
- Successor: Yang Wo
- Born: 852
- Died: December 24, 905 (aged 52–53)
- Burial: Xingling Mausoleum (興陵, in modern Yizheng, Jiangsu)
Full name
- Family name: Yáng (楊); Given name: Xingmi (行密)
Era dates
- Tiānyòu (天祐): 904–905
Posthumous name
- Initially Prince Wuzhong (武忠王) (honored by Tang dynasty), later Prince Xiaowu (孝武王) (honored by Yang Longyan), finally Emperor Wu (武皇帝) (honored by Yang Pu)
Temple name
- Taizu (太祖) (honored by Yang Pu)
- Dynasty: Wu

Yang Xingmi (Chinese: 楊行密; 852 – December 24, 905), né Yang Xingmin (楊行愍, name changed 886), courtesy name Huayuan (化源), formally Prince Wuzhong of Wu (吳武忠王, "martial and faithful"), later posthumously honored King Xiaowu of Wu (吳孝武王, "filial and martial") then Emperor Wu of Wu (吳武帝) with the temple name of Taizu (太祖), was a Chinese military general, monarch, and politician. He was the military governor (jiedushi) of Huainan Circuit (淮南, headquartered in modern Yangzhou, Jiangsu) late in the Chinese Tang dynasty, whose takeover of Huainan and several nearby circuits allowed him and his family to rule over territory that would eventually become the Five Dynasties and Ten Kingdoms state Wu (although Yang Xingmi would be the first ruler in his line to receive the title of Prince of Wu, it was a Tang-bestowed title and did not denote independence of the state), including most of modern Jiangsu and Anhui and parts of modern Jiangxi and Hubei.

== Background ==
Yang Xingmin was born in 852, during the reign of Emperor Xuānzong of Tang. He was from Lu Prefecture (廬州, in modern Hefei, Anhui). His ancestors, including his father Yang Fu (楊怤), were farmers for generations. In youth, Tian Jun and he became close friends, and they came to refer to each other as brother. It was said that he was physically strong in his youth, and during the Qianfu era (874–879) of Emperor Xuānzong's grandson Emperor Xizong, Yang Xingmin became a bandit. He was captured, but the prefect of Lu Prefecture, Zheng Qi, was impressed by his appearance, and stated to him, "You will be rich and honored one day. Why be a bandit?" Zheng then released him. Yang later became a soldier of the Lu Prefecture militia, and he distinguished himself in battles. However, as a result, his commander was apprehensive of him, and persuaded then-prefect Lang Youfu (郎幼復) to send Yang on an away mission. When Yang subsequently met his commander to bid farewell, and the commander, wanting to pretend to favor Yang, asked Yang what favors Yang would want him to do, if any; Yang responded, "I need your head!" and then killed him. Yang then took control of the militia and declared himself the commander. Lang was unable to control him, and so submitted a report to Gao Pian the military governor (jiedushi) of Huainan Circuit, which Lu Prefecture belonged to, recommending that Gao commission Yang the new prefect to replace Lang himself. Gao agreed, and Emperor Xizong subsequently, at Gao's recommendation, issued such a commission.

== As prefect of Lu Prefecture ==
Also in 883, two of Gao Pian's officers, Yu Gongchu (俞公楚) and Yao Guiili (姚歸禮), failed in an assassination attempt against Gao's favored sorcerer Lü Yongzhi, who had in effect taken over Huainan's governance due to Gao's trust in him. Lü thus made accusations against them, and Gao sent them out to combat agrarian rebels. Lü then secretly informed Yang (falsely) that Yu and Yao's intent was to attack Lu Prefecture. Yang responded by laying an ambush for Yu and Yao, killing them, and then informing Gao that they had planned a mutiny. Gao, not knowing that Lü put this incident into motion, rewarded Yang for putting down the "mutiny."

In 884, when Gao's nephew Gao Yu (高澞), then the prefect of nearby Shu Prefecture (舒州, in modern Anqing, Anhui), came under the attack of the local agrarian rebel Chen Ru (陳儒), Gao Yu sought aid from Yang. Yang did not have enough soldiers to respond, but sent his officer Li Shenfu, who tricked Chen into believing that a large army was arriving from Lu. As a result, Chen fled. Subsequently, when Qin Zongquan, who was previously the Tang military governor of Fengguo Circuit (奉國, headquartered in modern Zhumadian, Henan) but who had rebelled against Tang by this point, sent a brother to attack Lu, Yang sent Tian Jun to repel Qin's attack. Meanwhile, when other agrarian rebels Wu Jiong (吳迥) and Li Ben (李本) attacked Shu, Gao Yu abandoned it (and was subsequently executed by Gao Pian). Yang then sent his officers Tao Ya (陶雅) and Zhang Xun (張訓) to attack Wu and Li; after Tao and Zhang subsequently captured and executed Wu and Li, Yang commissioned Tao as the prefect of Shu.

In 886 — by which point the prefects of Huainan appeared to be attacking each other at will to enlarge their spheres of influence — Zhang Ao (張翱) the prefect of Shou Prefecture (壽州, in modern Lu'an, Anhui) sent his officer Wei Qian (魏虔) to attack Lu. Yang sent Tian, Li Shenfu, and Zhang Xun to resist, and they repelled Wei's attack. Meanwhile, though, Xu Qing (許勍) the prefect of Chú Prefecture (滁洲, in modern Chuzhou, Anhui) attacked Shu; Tao was unable to resist, and fled back to Lu, allowing Xu to take Shu. Also in 886, under Gao's order, for reasons unclear, Yang changed his name from Xingmin to Xingmi.

== War for control of Huainan Circuit ==
=== War against Qin Yan and Bi Shiduo ===
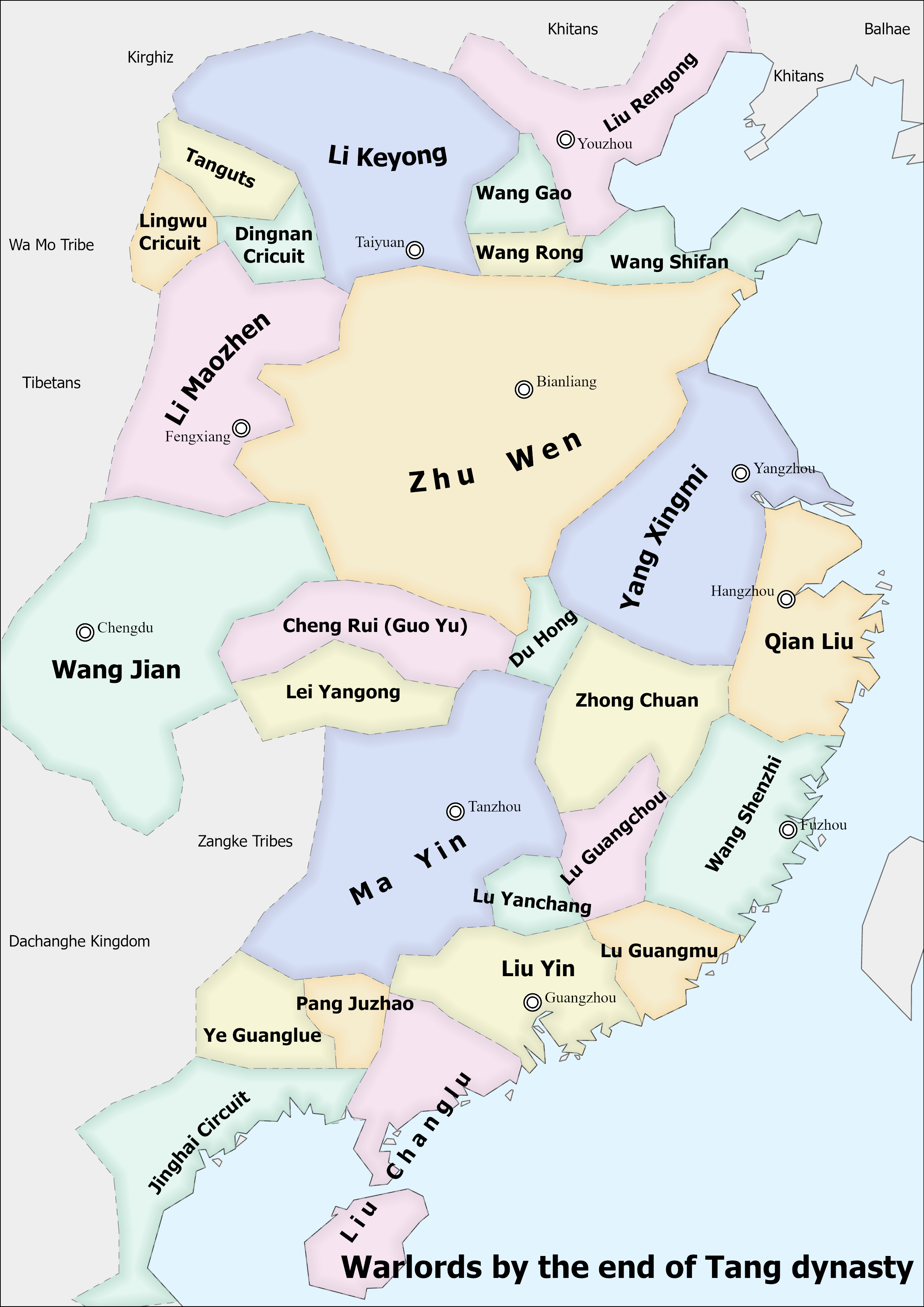
Map of Tang warlords as of 902 CE

In 887, Gao Pian's officer Bi Shiduo, fearing that Lü Yongzhi would have him killed, rebelled and put Huainan's capital Yang Prefecture (揚州) under siege. Lü, who then had a fallout with Gao himself (as Gao wanted to compromise with Bi while Lü opposed), sent Yang Xingmi an order in Gao's name requesting that he come to Yang Prefecture's aid. Yang, under the advice of his strategist Yuan Xi (袁襲), decided to act. He gathered his own forces and requested additional forces from Sun Duan (孫端) the prefect of neighboring He Prefecture (和州, in modern Chaohu, Anhui), and headed for Yang Prefecture. Before he got there, Lü, with Gao and Gao's nephew Gao Jie (高傑) turning against him, already fled Yang Prefecture, and they rendezvoused at Tianchang (天長, in modern Chuzhou), along with Bi's one-time ally Zhang Shenjian (張神劍), who had turned against Bi due to Bi's refusal to give him the spoils he wanted. (By this point, Bi, who had received aid from Qin Yan the governor of Xuanshe Circuit (宣歙, headquartered in modern Xuancheng, Anhui), had offered the military governorship to Qin, so he informed Zhang that any division of spoils had to await Qin's decision, drawing Zhang's anger.)

Yang Xingmi then took these joint forces and put Yang Prefecture under siege. Qin and Bi initially defended the city against the siege, but their attempts to counterattack were repelled by Yang Xingmi, who inflicted heavy losses on their troops. Meanwhile, under siege, Yang Prefecture was running out of food supplies, leaving to severe famine and cannibalism. (During the siege, Qin put Gao to death, and Yang Xingmi responded by a great display of mourning.) After several months, Yang Xingmi, unable to capture the city, considered withdrawing, but one night, Lü's former subordinate Zhang Shenwei (張審威) opened the city gates and allowed Yang Xingmi's forces in. Qin and Bi fled, allowing Yang Xingmi to capture the city. He claimed the title of acting military governor, while putting Lü and several other officers whose loyalty he considered suspect to death, including Zhang Shenjian.

However, by this point, Qin Zongquan's general Sun Ru had arrived in the vicinity, having been sent earlier in the year by Qin Zongquan to vie for control of Huainan Circuit. (When Qin Zongquan subsequently tried to recall Sun, Sun killed Qin Zongquan's brother Qin Zongheng (秦宗衡), who was theoretically the commander of the army, and refused the recall, effectively acting independently from this point on.) Qin Yan and Bi joined forces with Sun, who immediately put up a threatening posture against Yang Xingmi. Yuan believed that with Yang Xingmi's forces worn out by the lengthy siege and the people of Yang Prefecture facing starvation, Yang Xingmi was in no shape to confront Sun. He suggested that Yang Xingmi abandon the city. Yang Xingmi agreed, and he prepared for an evacuation and return to Lu Prefecture, but did not carry it out immediately.

Meanwhile, the Tang imperial government, which was also weary of the developments at Huainan Circuit, had commissioned Zhu Quanzhong the military governor of Xuanwu Circuit (宣武, headquartered in modern Kaifeng, Henan) the military governor of Huainan as well. Zhu announced that he was making Yang Xingmi deputy military governor, while announcing his own officer Li Fan (李璠) as acting military governor. He sent his advisor Zhang Yanfan (張延範) to Yang Prefecture to convey his good will and decisions to Yang Xingmi. Yang Xingmi initially welcomed Zhang, but upon hearing that Zhu was sending Li Fan as acting military governor, turned angry. Zhang, in fear, fled back to Xuanwu. Meanwhile, Li Fan, on his way south, was ambushed by Shi Pu the military governor of Ganhua Circuit (感化, headquartered in modern Xuzhou, Jiangsu), who was angry that Zhu, not he, was given Huainan. With both Yang Xingmi and Shi turning against him, Zhu abandoned his plans of taking control of Huainan. He subsequently recommended to the imperial government that Yang be made acting military governor. In spring 888, Sun (who by this point had put Qin Yan and Bi to death and taken over their forces) finally attacked Yang Prefecture, capturing it easily. Sun claimed the title of military governor. Yang Xingmi fled, and per Yuan's suggestion, returned to Lu Prefecture to prepare his next step.

=== War against Sun Ru ===
Yang Xingmi, however, believed that Sun Ru would eventually attack him, and in fall 888, he considered heading south to attack Zhong Chuan the military governor of Zhennan Circuit (鎮南, headquartered in modern Nanchang, Jiangxi) to try to take over Zhong's territory. Yuan Xi, however, pointed out that Zhong had possessed Zhennan for years and was well-prepared for an attack; instead, he suggested that Yang attack Zhao Huang the governor of Xuanshe (who had been commissioned by Qin Yan when Qin left Xuanshe to head for Huainan). Yang agreed, and also persuaded Sun Duan and Zhang Xiong, an independent general who was then at Shangyuan (上元, in modern Nanjing, Jiangsu), to attack Zhao as well. With Zhao's main forces distracted by Sun's and Zhang's attacks, Yang was able to cross the Yangtze River easily and put Xuanshe's capital Xuan Prefecture (宣州) under siege. When Zhao's brother Zhao Qianzhi (趙乾之) the prefect of Chi Prefecture (池州, in modern Chizhou, Anhui) tried to come to aid Zhao Huang, Yang sent Tao Ya to face him, and Tao defeated him, forcing him to flee to Zhennan. By 889, With Xuan Prefecture running out of food, Zhao Huang's officer Zhou Jinsi (周進思) expelled him; he tried to flee to Yang Prefecture, but Tian Jun captured him. After Yang reported what occurred to Emperor Xizong's brother and successor Emperor Zhaozong, Emperor Zhaozong commissioned Yang as the governor of Xuanshe. Meanwhile, Zhu Quanzhong, who was an old friend of Zhao Huang's, sent emissaries to request that Yang release Zhao to him. However, Yang, accepting Yuan's suggestion that doing so might leave Zhao as a threat, instead executed Zhao and gave Zhao's head to Zhu's emissaries. Meanwhile, he sent Tian to attack Chang Prefecture (常州, in modern Changzhou, Jiangsu), then held by Du Leng (杜稜), a subordinate of Qian Liu; Tian surprised Du and captured him, taking Chang Prefecture. Yang also sent Ma Jingyan (馬敬言) to capture Run Prefecture (潤州, in modern Zhenjiang, Jiangsu), and Ma did so. Subsequently, Emperor Zhaozong upgraded Xuanshe to a circuit with a military governor, renamed it Ningguo, and made Yang its military governor. Yang then also sent Li You (李友) to capture Sū Prefecture (蘇州, in modern Suzhou, Jiangsu), but subsequently, Sun Ru attacked and took Su, killing Li You; Yang's officer An Renyi (安仁義), who was then at Run, then abandoned Run as well, allowing Sun to take Run. When Sun attacked Lu, Cai Chou (蔡儔), whom Yang had left in defense of Lu, also surrendered it to Sun.

In spring 891, Sun pressed his attack, repeatedly defeating An and Tian, pushing toward Xuan Prefecture. It was said that the morale of Yang's army fell low in light of the defeats, rebounding only somewhat after some successes by Li Shenfu and Tai Meng (臺濛). Sun pushed forward to Huangchi (黃池, in modern Wuhu, Anhui) and defeated Yang's officers Liu Wei (劉威) and Zhu Yanshou (a younger brother of Yang's wife Lady Zhu). However, Sun's army was thereafter stricken by a flood, forcing him to withdraw and return to Yang Prefecture. He nevertheless was able to send his officers Kang Wang (康暀) and An Jingsi (安景思) to capture He and Chú Prefectures, respectively, although Li Shenfu soon recaptured them.

Subsequently, Yang and Zhu Quanzhong entered into an alliance against Sun. When Sun heard this, he decided that he would destroy Yang first and then attack Zhu. He thus forced the mature men and women of Yang Prefecture across the Yangtze to accompany his army, while killing the old and the weak. (As Sun left Yang Prefecture, Yang sent Zhang Xun and Li Decheng into Yang Prefecture to take control of the remaining food supplies in the city and to comfort those who escaped Sun's massacre, effectively allowing him to take the city without a fight.) Sun subsequently surrounded Yang Xingmi at Guangde (廣德, in modern Xuancheng), and Yang Xingmi only escaped through the efforts of his officer Li Jian (李簡). Sun then advanced toward Xuan Prefecture. Yang Xingmi sought aid from Qian, who then possessed the Hang Prefecture (杭州, in modern Hangzhou, Zhejiang) region; Qian did not launch troops, but did aid Yang's army with food.

In spring 892, With Sun's numerically superior army pressuring him, Yang considered abandoning Xuan Prefecture and withdrawing to Tongguan (銅官, in modern Tongling, Anhui). Liu, Li Shenfu, and Dai Yougui (戴友規) dissuaded him, pointing out that Sun believed that he could destroy Yang quickly and therefore carried a minimal amount of food, and if Yang could simply refuse to engage Sun and wear Sun's army down, he could be destroyed. Dai further persuaded Yang to send the Yang Prefecture refugees who had fled to Ningguo back to Yang Prefecture to settle down, to try to see if that would cause Sun's army to miss Yang Prefecture. Meanwhile, Zhang and Yang's other officers also retook Chang and Run Prefectures. When Shi Pu also wanted to use this opportunity to advance south, Zhang and Li Decheng repelled his forces and further took Chǔ Prefecture (楚州, in modern Huai'an, Jiangsu, note different tone from the prefecture in modern Chuzhou).

By summer 892, Sun's army had been worn down sufficiently that Yang's army was beginning to have successes, and Zhang cut off Sun's army's food supply routes. Further, Sun's army was suffering from diseases, and Sun himself was stricken with malaria. With food supplies running low, he sent his officers Liu Jianfeng and Ma Yin to the nearby countryside to pillage for food. Yang, after hearing that Sun had fallen ill, made a final attack against Sun, defeating him. Tian captured Sun on the battlefield, and Yang executed Sun, sending his head to Emperor Zhaozong. Most of Sun's army surrendered to Yang, although Liu Jianfeng and Ma Yin took some of the remnants and advanced south. (They eventually reached the Hunan region and took it over.) Yang then marched victoriously to Yang Prefecture and made it his headquarters again, while stationing Tian at Xuan Prefecture and An Renyi at Run Prefecture. Emperor Zhaozong, receiving Yang's report, made him the military governor of Huainan, while making Tian the acting military governor of Ningguo and An the prefect of Run.

== Rule over Huainan and nearby territory ==
=== Early rule ===
It was said that due to years of warfare, Huainan Circuit was stripped of its population and wealth. Yang Xingmi was frugal, promoted farming, decreased the tax burden, and encouraged commerce with nearby circuits. It was said that within several years, Huainan was restored to what it was before the war began. He organized 5,000 of Sun Ru's soldiers who submitted to him into an elite corp known as the Heiyun Corps (黑雲都), and had them serve as his advance corps in battles against other circuits.

Meanwhile, although Sun's subordinates largely submitted to Yang (other than the escaped Liu Jianfeng and Ma Yin), Cai Chou the prefect of Lu Prefecture, who had previously been Yang's subordinate but had surrendered to Sun, started a campaign to resist Yang at Lu Prefecture, along with Ni Zhang (倪章) the prefect of Shu Prefecture. Cai, in order to show resolve, dug open the graves of Yang's ancestors, and further had an emissary offer his prefect seal to Zhu Quanzhong, seeking aid from Zhu. Zhu, however, despised Cai for his treachery, and refused to aid Cai; instead, he informed Yang of what Cai had done. Yang thanked Zhu and sent Li Shenfu to attack Cai, and commanded a follow-up army himself. Cai's subordinate Zhang Hao surrendered to Yang. Lu Prefecture fell in fall 893, and Yang executed Cai — but refused to accept the suggestion that Cai's ancestral tombs be dug up, stating: "Because of what Cai Chou did, the people under heaven despised him. Why should I follow his example?" Thereafter, he also sent Tian Jun to attack She Prefecture (歙州, in modern Huangshan, Anhui); when the people of She offered to surrender if Yang would make Tao Ya, who was known for kindness to the people, prefect, Yang did so, and She surrendered. Yang treated the imperially-commissioned prefect Pei Shu with respect, and sent him back to the imperial government. Meanwhile, Ni abandoned Shu and fled, and Yang sent Li Shenfu to be its prefect.

In spring 894, Wu Tao (吳討) the prefect of Huang Prefecture (黃州, in modern Wuhan, Hubei) — which belonged to neighboring Wuchang Circuit (武昌, headquartered in modern Wuhan) — submitted to Yang. When Wuchang's military governor Du Hong subsequently attacked Huang, Yang sent Zhu Yanshou to aid Wu Tao, starting years of warfare with Wuchang. (Wu subsequently offered to resign since he feared further attack from Du; Yang then had Ju Zhang (瞿章) take over as prefect.) Meanwhile, the relationship between Yang and Zhu Quanzhong also broke down over two disputes — when an emissary of Zhu's insulted Zhang Jian (張諫) the prefect of Si Prefecture (泗州, in modern Huai'an), Zhang responded by submitting to Yang, and when Yang sent his officer Tang Linghui (唐令回) to Xuanwu's capital Bian Prefecture (汴州) with a large supply of tea to try to sell it for profit, Zhu had Tang detained and seized all of the tea. In spring 895, Yang submitted a petition to Emperor Zhaozong accusing Zhu of crimes, requesting that Emperor Zhaozong order the military governors to the north to attack Zhu with him; Emperor Zhaozong's court, which was extremely weak by that point, was not recorded as having taken any actions on Yang's petition. Yang subsequently attacked Shou Prefecture and captured it; he made Zhu Yanshou its military prefect (團練使, Tuanlianshi), and Zhu Yanshou was subsequently able to beat back a Xuanwu counterattack and able to hold Shou.

Meanwhile, Dong Chang the military governor of Yisheng Circuit (義勝, headquartered in modern Shaoxing, Zhejiang) had misjudged his strength and declared himself the emperor of a new state of Luoping (羅平). Qian Liu (who carried the title of military governor of Zhenhai Circuit (鎮海, previously headquartered at Run Prefecture but now was headquartered at Qian's base Hang Prefecture)), who had previously been Dong's subordinate, used this as the excuse to attack Dong, seeking to conquer Dong's Yisheng Circuit. Yang, not wanting to see Qian conquer Dong, tried to dissuade Qian, and also sent emissaries to Dong urging him to immediately cancel any use of imperial title and resume offering tributes to Emperor Zhaozong. Qian would not relent in his attack, however, so Yang sent Tai Meng to attack Sū Prefecture to divert Qian's attention, while submitting petitions in Dong's defense. However, while Yang, who later went to Su himself to command the siege, was able to capture Su, additional attacks by Tian and An Renyi against other officers of Qian's were repelled, and Qian's attacks against Dong did not abate. By summer 896, Dong was forced to surrender to Qian, who executed him and took over Yisheng (which was subsequently renamed Zhendong). Meanwhile, Qian, Du Hong, and Zhong Chuan, all fearing that they would be the next target of Yang's expansion, entered into an alliance with Zhu Quanzhong. Around this time, Emperor Zhaozong also gave Yang the honorary titles of acting Taifu (太傅) and Tong Zhongshu Menxia Pingzhangshi (同中書門下平章事) and created him the Prince of Hongnong.

By spring 897, Zhu Quanzhong had achieved final victory against two military governors that he had waged war against for years — Zhu Xuan the military governor of Tianping Circuit (天平, headquartered in modern Tai'an, Shandong) and Zhu Xuan's cousin Zhu Jin the military governor of Taining Circuit (泰寧, headquartered in modern Jining, Shandong) — capturing and executing Zhu Xuan, forcing Zhu Jin to flee, and taking control of both circuits, allowing him full control of the region between the Yellow River and the Huai River. (Shi Pu's Ganhua Circuit had fallen to him in 893.) Zhu Jin fled to Huainan, along with the Hedong Circuit (河東, headquartered in modern Taiyuan, Shanxi) officers Shi Yan (史儼) and Li Chengsi (李承嗣), whom Hedong's military governor Li Keyong had previously sent to aid Zhu Xuan and Zhu Jin. Yang personally went to Gaoyou (高郵, in modern Yangzhou) to welcome them. It was said that previously, the Huainan forces were only capable at water welfare, and now with the injection of the field soldiers from Tianping, Taining, and Hedong, their field fighting capabilities were greatly improved. Li Keyong subsequently sent emissaries to Yang, requesting that Shi and Li Chengsi be returned to him; Yang agreed, but as Yang treated Shi and Li Chengsi well and awarded them with much treasure, neither Shi nor Li Chengsi actually ever returned to Hedong, and they served Huainan thereafter.

Later in spring 897, Yang resumed his attacks against Wuchang. At Du's request for assistance, Zhu Quanzhong sent his adoptive son Zhu Yougong (朱友恭) to attack Huang Prefecture. Ju Zhang abandoned Huang in response to Zhu Yougong's attack, but was subsequently captured by Zhu Yougong. Meanwhile, Zhu Quanzhong, having conquered Tianping and Taining, decided to make Huainan his next target, so he gathered his available forces and sent his major general Pang Shigu (龐師古) with 70,000 soldiers from Xuanwu and Ganhua Circuits to Qingkou (清口, in modern Huai'an), posturing to head to Yang Prefecture; another major general Ge Congzhou with the forces from Tianping and Taining Circuits to Anfeng (安豐, in modern Lu'an), posturing to head to Shou Prefecture; and Zhu Quanzhong himself with his main forces to Sù Prefecture (宿州, in modern Suzhou, Anhui, note different tone from the prefecture in modern Jiangsu). The people of Huainan Circuit were greatly shocked and dismayed by Zhu's forces. However, Pang, because he had such an impressive force, underestimated Yang Xingmi's army. Yang Xingmi had Zhu Jin serve as his advance commander, and Zhu constructed a dam on the Huai River. When Yang Xingmi attacked Pang, Zhu released the waters to flood Pang's army, and then attacked Pang with Yang. Pang's army was crushed by the waters and the Huainan forces, and Pang was killed. Zhu Yanshou also defeated Ge's army. Hearing that both of his generals had been defeated, Zhu Quanzhong also retreated. The Battle of Qingkou thus affirmed Yang's control of the territory between the Huai and the Yangtze Rivers.

In spring 898, Qian Liu, Zhong Chuan, Du Hong, and Wang Shifan, the military governor of Pinglu Circuit (平盧, headquartered in modern Weifang, Shandong), all submitted petitions to Emperor Zhaozong, requesting that the imperial government declare a general campaign against Yang, with Zhu Quanzhong as the campaign commander; Emperor Zhaozong refused. Meanwhile, hearing of Zhu Quanzhong's defeat, Zhao Kuangning the military governor of Zhongyi Circuit (忠義, headquartered in modern Xiangfan, Hubei) secretly entered into an alliance with Yang, but after Zhu Quanzhong found out and attacked Zhongyi, capturing Zhao's brother Zhao Kuanglin (趙匡璘), Zhao Kuangning agreed to abandon his alliance with Yang. Similarly, Cui Hong (崔洪) the military governor of Fengguo Circuit, a vassal of Zhu's, also had secret communications with Yang, and when Zhu discovered this, Zhu sent Zhang Cunjing (張存敬) to attack Cui. Cui warded off the attack by sending his brother Cui Xian (崔賢) to Zhu as a hostage and promised to contribute 2,000 soldiers to Zhu's campaigns. Subsequently, when Zhu sent Cui Xian back to Fengguo and demanded that he return with the 2,000 promised soldiers, Cui Hong's officer Cui Jingsi (崔景思) assassinated Cui Xian and seized Cui Hong, fleeing to Yang's domain with him and the soldiers.

=== Late rule ===
In spring 899, Yang Xingmi and Zhu Jin attacked Ganhua's capital Xu Prefecture (徐州). Zhu Quanzhong, after first sending his officer Zhang Guihou (張歸厚) to try to relieve Xu, also personally led a relief force that trailed. When Yang heard of Zhu's impending arrival, he withdrew.

In 900, Emperor Zhaozong bestowed on Yang the honorary chancellor title of Shizhong (侍中).

In fall 901, rumors arrived at Yang's headquarters that Qian Liu had been assassinated. Believing the rumors to be true and believing that this would be his opportunity to seize Qian's capital Hang Prefecture, he sent Li Shenfu to attack Qian's Zhenhai Circuit. Qian sent his general Gu Quanwu (顧全武) to resist, but Li Shenfu defeated and captured him. However, Li soon realized that Qian had not been assassinated and that he would not be able to capture more of Qian's territory. To ward off a Qian counterattack, he, who had captured Qian's hometown Lin'an (臨安, in modern Hangzhou) by this point, protected Qian's ancestral tombs and allowed Gu, whom Qian valued greatly, to write home; he also pretended a large Huainan reinforcement was on the way. After extracting a large amount of monetary award from Qian, he then withdrew. (Yang later returned Gu to Zhenhai in return for Qin Pei (秦裴), a Huainan officer who was captured when Qian recaptured Sū Prefecture.)

By late 901, the powerful palace eunuchs, upon learning of a plot between Emperor Zhaozong and the chancellor Cui Yin to slaughter them, planned to kill Cui. In response, Cui summoned Zhu Quanzhong to the imperial capital Chang'an with an army. Upon hearing of Zhu's impending arrival, the eunuchs, led by Han Quanhui, seized Emperor Zhaozong and fled to the domain of Han's ally Li Maozhen the military governor of Fengxiang Circuit (鳳翔, headquartered in modern Baoji, Shaanxi). Zhu soon arrived in Chang'an's vicinity and, at Cui's urging, put Fengxiang's capital Fengxiang Municipality under siege. With Fengxiang under siege, Emperor Zhaozong issued an edict (possibly under the eunuchs' duress) in spring 902 to Yang, commissioning him as the overall commander of the circuits to the east, bestowing him the honorary chancellor title of Zhongshu Ling (中書令), and created him the Prince of Wu. The edict ordered Yang to attack Zhu from the east. (The edict was delivered by Li Yan, the son of the retired chancellor Zhang Jun, on whom Emperor Zhaozong bestowed the imperial surname of Li. Li Yan would subsequently remain in Yang's domain to serve as the Tang emperor's representative, although after Li Yan's arrival Yang also himself began exercising imperial authority, as the edict that Li Yan delivered authorized him to do so.) Yang thereafter prepared a campaign against Zhu.

While Yang was preparing the campaign against Zhu, Tian Jun, who was by this point the military governor of Ningguo, was preparing an attack against Feng Hongduo, an officer of Zhang Xiong's who had continued to occupy Sheng Prefecture (昇州, i.e., Shangyuan) after Zhang's death, who had an impressive fleet. (Because of his fleet, Feng had refused to submit to Yang.) Tian built a fleet himself in preparation, and Feng decided to preempt him by attacking Ningguo's capital Xuan Prefecture with his fleet, despite Yang's sending messengers to urge him not to. When Feng engaged Tian, however, Tian defeated him and crushed his fleet. Feng, in light of his defeat, considered heading east out onto the East China Sea, but Yang persuaded him that he would be treated well if he submitted to Yang. Feng did so, and Yang commissioned him as deputy military governor of Huainan. Yang then sent Li Shenfu to serve as the prefect of Sheng.

With the Feng threat over, Yang launched his attack on Zhu's domain, leaving Li Chengsi in charge at Huainan's headquarters. However, his army ran into food supply problems, as the large ships that he used to ship food supplies got stuck in the canals. (Xu Wen had suggested supplying the army with small ships instead, to no avail, but after this incident Yang began to value Xu's advice and began to promote him.) Subsequently, when the Huainan army attacked but could not capture Sù Prefecture quickly, Yang withdrew. (With Yang's campaign having failed, by 903 Li Maozhen was forced to kill Han and other eunuchs who followed Han and surrender Emperor Zhaozong to Zhu, to sue for peace. Zhu subsequently slaughtered the remaining eunuchs and took Emperor Zhaozong back to Chang'an and kept him under effective control.)

In fall 902, Qian's officers Xu Wan and Xu Zaisi (許再思) mutinied against him and tried to take Hang Prefecture for themselves. When their initial attempt failed, they enticed Tian from coming to their aid. When Tian arrived at Hang Prefecture, he put it under siege and offered that if Qian would surrender it, he would be allowed to withdraw to Zhendong Circuit without further pursuit from Tian. Qian refused and, under Gu's suggestion, decided to enlist Yang's aid in stopping Tian (who was still Yang's vassal at this point). He sent Gu, with his son Qian Chuanliao (錢傳璙), to Huainan as emissaries. Gu pointed out to Yang that if Tian captured Zhenhai, his power would increase greatly and would threaten Yang's; instead, he offered that if Yang would order Tian to withdraw, Qian Liu would leave Qian Chuanliao as a hostage. Yang accepted the proposal and gave a daughter to Qian Chuanliao in marriage. Yang subsequently ordered Tian to withdraw, threatening that if he did not, Yang would send someone else to take over Ningguo. Faced with the threat, Tian withdrew after extracting a monetary payment from Qian and forcing Qian to surrender a son (Qian Chuanguan) as hostage.

In spring 903, Yang sent Li Shenfu, assisted by Liu You (劉有), to attack Du Hong's Wuchang Circuit. Meanwhile, Wang Shifan, who had similarly received an edict from Emperor Zhaozong to attack Zhu during the Fengxiang siege and who had acted on it, was now facing the overwhelming attack of Zhu's, and he sought aid from Yang. Yang sent Wang Maozhang to aid him and launched an attack on Sù Prefecture, but soon withdrew his attack from Sù. In addition, while Wang Maozhang initially had successes in conjunction with Wang Shifan in repelling the Xuanwu attack, soon, Wang Maozhang, determining that it would be impossible to indefinitely hold off the Xuanwu attack, withdrew from Pinglu, leaving Wang Shifan without further aid. By winter 903, Wang Shifan was forced to resubmit to Zhu.

Meanwhile, it was said that Tian had become deeply resentful against Yang for forcing him to abandon Zhenhai. His resentment was furthered when he went to Yang Prefecture to meet Yang Xingmi to request that Chi and She Prefecture, both of which had previously belonged to Ningguo, be returned to Ningguo, and Yang refused. In summer 903, Tian and An Renyi (who was then still at Run Prefecture as its military prefect) together rose in rebellion against Yang; they eventually enticed Zhu Yanshou, who was then at Shou Prefecture and who carried the title of military governor of Fengguo, to join them as well (although Zhu Yanshou did not initially publicly state his intentions), and sent emissaries to Zhu Quanzhong, who also postured to attack Huainan to aid them. In face of the threat, Yang recalled Li Shenfu (who had been attacking Wuchang) to attack Tian and sent Wang Maozhang and Xu Wen to attack An. Yang, realizing that Zhu Yanshou was about to turn against him, pretended to have suffered a stroke and stated to his wife Lady Zhu that he would be entrusting the headquarters to Zhu Yanshou; she wrote Zhu Yanshou relaying Yang's remarks. Yang then summoned Zhu Yanshou to Yang Prefecture; believing Yang's sincerity, Zhu Yanshou went and was seized and executed by Yang, who then also executed Zhu Yanshou's brothers and divorced Lady Zhu.

Meanwhile, Li Shenfu had initial successes against Tian's officers Wang Tan (王壇) and Wang Jian (汪建). Tian therefore decided to depart Xuan Prefecture and engage Li Shenfu himself. At Li Shenfu's suggestion, Yang then sent Tai Meng to attack Xuan after Tian left Xuan. Upon hearing that Tai was about to arrive, Tian turned back to Xuan and engaged Tai. Tai sent letters in Yang's name to Tian's officers, who still bore allegiance to Yang, and then attacked, defeating Tian, who then fled back to Xuan Prefecture. Tai put Xuan under siege, and when Tian tried to counterattack, Tai defeated him and killed him. Yang, remembering his friendship with Tian, pardoned Tian's mother Lady Yin and continued to honor her as she was a mother. Further, he incorporated Tian's staff into his despite their earlier opposition to him. (An continued to hold out and would not be defeated and executed until spring 905.)

With Tian defeated, Yang commissioned Li Shenfu as the new military governor of Ningguo, but Li Shenfu declined and resumed the campaign against Wuchang. Instead, Yang commissioned Tai as governor (not military governor). Yang also sent Gu and Qian Chuanliao, along with Qian Chuanliao's wife (his daughter) back to Qian Liu. Meanwhile, Zhu Quanzhong had destroyed the city of Chang'an and forced Emperor Zhaozong to move the capital to Luoyang. On the journey to Luoyang, Emperor Zhaozong sent one final secret communique to Yang, Li Keyong, and Wang Jian the military governor of Xichuan Circuit (西川, headquartered in modern Chengdu, Sichuan) to ask for them to make an attempt to rescue him; none of the three did. Still, when Zhu Quanzhong sent emissaries to try to persuade Yang to abandon the campaign against Wuchang, Yang sent back the response, "I will do so and rebuild my relationship with you if the Son of Heaven were restored to Chang'an."

In summer 904, Li Shenfu fell ill and died while attacking Wuchang; Yang replaced him with Liu Cun (劉存). Meanwhile, Tai also died, and Yang replaced Tai with his oldest son Yang Wo.

In winter 904, Zhu Quanzhong himself led an army to try to aid Wuchang and sent other officers to raid Huainan territory. He also sent Cao Yanzuo (曹延祚) to Wuchang's capital E Prefecture (鄂州) to help Du defend it in light of Liu's siege. However, by spring 905, Liu had captured E Prefecture and taken Du and Cao prisoner; he sent them to Yang Prefecture, where they were executed, allowing Yang to incorporate Wuchang into his domain.

Through the years, Zhao Kuangning remained in communications with both Yang and Wang Jian, a situation that eventually drew Zhu's anger. In summer 905, he launched a major attack against both Zhao Kuangning and his brother Zhao Kuangming, the military governor of Jingnan Circuit (荊南, headquartered in modern Jingzhou, Hubei). The Zhao brothers were crushed; Zhao Kuangning fled to Huainan, and Zhao Kuangming fled to Xichuan. Zhu incorporated their domains into his. After his success, he decided to head east to attack Huainan, but after running into storms, withdrew.

Meanwhile, Yang grew ill, and faced a succession problem. The natural successor would be his son Yang Wo, but the Huainan staff members all had low opinions of Yang Wo. When Yang Xingmi brought up the matter with his secretary Zhou Yin (周隱) and told Zhou to issue an order summoning Yang Wo back from Xuan Prefecture, Zhou opposed the idea, stating that he viewed Yang Wo as an inappropriate successor due to his love for drinking and games. Instead, Zhou suggested that Yang entrust the circuit to Liu Wei with the direction that after Yang's younger sons grew older that the circuit be given to one of them — a proposal that Xu Wen and Zhang Hao attacked as unworkable. When Yang again told Zhou to summon Yang Wo, Zhou drafted such an order but then delayed sending it. However, Xu and Zhang found the order and sent it, and Yang Wo arrived in Yang Prefecture in winter 905. Yang Xingmi commissioned him as the acting military governor of Huainan and soon thereafter died. At the Huainan staff members' request, Li Yan issued an order under Tang imperial authority making Yang Wo the new military governor of Huainan and overall commander of the eastern circuits, succeeding Yang Xingmi.

== Personal information ==
=== Father ===
- Yang Fu (楊怤)

=== Wife ===
- Lady Zhu, the Lady of Yan, sister of Zhu Yanshou (divorced 903)

=== Major Concubines ===
- Lady Shi, mother of Yang Wo and Yang Longyan, the Lady of Wuchang, later honored Lady Dowager (honored 905), later Queen Dowager (honored 919)
- Lady Wang, mother of Yang Pu, honored Queen Dowager (honored 920), later Empress Dowager (honored 927, died 929)

=== Sons ===
- Yang Wo (楊渥), later Prince Wei of Hongnong, posthumously honored Prince Wei of Wu, then King Jing of Wu, then Emperor Jing of Wu (with temple name of Liezu)
- Yang Longyan (楊隆演), also known as Yang Wei (楊渭), later King Xuan of Wu, posthumously honored Emperor Xuan of Wu (with temple name of Gaozu)
- Yang Meng (楊濛), initially Duke of Lujiang (created 919), later Prince of Changshan (created 927), later Prince of Linchuan (created 928), later Duke of Liyang (demoted 934, executed 937), posthumously demoted to commoner rank, later title restored to Prince Ling of Linchuan
- Yang Pu (楊溥), later Emperor Rui of Wu
- Yang Xun (楊潯), Duke of Xin'an (created 919, died 919?)
- Yang Che (楊澈), initially Duke of Poyang (created 919), later Prince of Pingyuan (created 927), later Prince of Dehua (created 930)

=== Daughter ===
- Princess Xunyang
- Daughter, wife of Qian Chuanliao (錢傳璙, later known as Qian Yuanliao (錢元璙)), son of Qian Liu
- Daughter, wife of Jiang Yanhui (蔣延徽)
- Daughter, wife of son of Li Yu, later wife of Xu Jie
- Daughter, wife of Liu Rengui (劉仁規)

Chinese nobility
New creation	Prince of Wu; 902–905	Succeeded by Yang Wo (Prince Wei of Hongnong)
