= Qin Yan =

Chinese military general and politician

Qin Yan (秦彥) (died March 2, 888), né Qin Li (秦立), was a Chinese military general, warlord and politician during the medieval Tang dynasty, who seized control of Xuanshe Circuit (宣歙, headquartered in modern Xuancheng, Anhui), and thereafter briefly seized control of Yang Prefecture (揚州, in modern Yangzhou, Jiangsu), the capital of Huainan Circuit (淮南), before being defeated by warlord Yang Xingmi. He joined forced with Sun Ru thereafter against Yang, but was killed by Sun.

== Background and participation in Huang Chao's rebellion ==
It is not known when Qin Yan was born, but it is known that he was from Xu Prefecture (徐州, in modern Xuzhou, Jiangsu), where he served as a soldier, and that he was originally named Qin Li. During the Qianfu era (874–879) of Emperor Xizong, there was an occasion when he was accused of theft and imprisoned, set to be sentenced to death. One night, he dreamed of someone telling him, "You may follow me." Once he woke up, he broke out of jail. He changed his name to Qin Yan, and he gathered a group of 100 men. With these men, he surprised and killed the magistrate of Xiapei County (下邳, in modern Xuzhou), seizing the supplies of the county government. He then took these men and joined the army of the agrarian rebel Huang Chao.

In 879, the Tang military governor (jiedushi) of Zhenhai Circuit (鎮海, headquartered in modern Zhenjiang, Jiangsu), Gao Pian, sent his officers Zhang Lin (張璘) and Liang Zuan (梁纉) to attack Huang, and they repeatedly defeated Huang. Qin, along with several other key Huang followers, including Bi Shiduo, Li Hanzhi, and Xu Qing (許勍), surrendered to Gao. Gao made him the prefect of He Prefecture (和州, in modern Chaohu, Anhui).

== Seizure of Xuanshe Circuit ==
In 882, Qin Yan had his son take several thousand soldiers to make a surprise attack on Xuanshe Circuit's capital Xuan Prefecture (宣州). Qin's forces expelled the governor (觀察使, Guanchashi) of Xuanshe, Dou Jue (竇潏), who was ill at that time, allowing Qin to take his place. The imperial government, unable to take any other action, allowed Qin to remain as governor. Dou's staff member Zhang Ji (張佶), despising Qin, left Xuan Prefecture.

== Seizure of Yang Prefecture ==
In summer 887, Bi Shiduo, fearing that he would be targeted for execution by Lü Yongzhi, a sorcerer whom Gao Pian, who was then the military governor of Huainan Circuit, trusted and who had taken effective control of the governance of Huainan, rebelled and put Huainan's capital Yang Prefecture under siege. With Lü defending the city, however, Bi could not quickly capture the city, so he sent messengers to Qin Yan, seeking aid and offering to support Qin to be the military governor of Huainan if they were victorious. Qin Yan sent his officer Qin Chou (秦稠) to aid Bi in the siege. With Gao and his nephew Gao Jie (高傑) turning against Lü inside the city, Lü abandoned it and fled, allowing Bi to seize the city and put Gao and his family under house arrest. Bi welcomed Qin to Yang Prefecture and supported him as Huainan's military governor.

== Defeat and death ==
However, Yang Xingmi the prefect of Lu Prefecture (廬州, in modern Hefei, Anhui) refused to recognize Qin. He joined forces with Sun Duan (孫端) the prefect of He Prefecture, Lü, and Bi's erstwhile ally Zhang Shenjian (張神劍) (who was angry that Bi was not sharing the spoils of war with him) and put Yang Prefecture under siege. Qin sent Bi and Zheng Hanzhang (鄭漢章) to counterattack, but Bi and Zheng were crushed by Yang Xingmi. The city fell into a deep famine, and the Xuanshe soldiers resorted to cannibalism. Nevertheless, Yang Xingmi was unable to capture the city and considered withdrawal. However, on November 18, Lü's former associate Zhang Shenwei (張審威) opened the city gates and welcomed Yang Xingmi's forces in. Hearing the news, Qin and Bi consulted the Buddhist nun Wang Fengxian (王奉仙), whom they believed to have prophetic abilities; Wang urged them to flee, and they did so, allowing Yang Xingmi to take over the city.

Qin and Bi initially tried to flee to Dongtang (東塘, near Yang Prefecture), but the general Zhang Xiong, who then occupied Dongtang, refused to receive them. They considered heading south back to Xuanshe's headquarters Xuan Prefecture (宣州). However, by that point, Qin Zongquan's army, commanded by his brother Qin Zongheng (秦宗衡), had arrived in the vicinity, and Qin Zongheng sent messengers to Qin Yan and Bi, inviting them to join forces against Yang Xingmi. They then joined Qin Zongheng.

Soon thereafter, Qin Zongheng was assassinated by his deputy Sun Ru, who took over the army. Sun, along with Qin Yan and Bi, then attacked Gaoyou, capturing it, forcing Zhang Shenjian to flee to Yang Prefecture, where Yang Xingmi killed him. However, Sun did not trust Qin Yan and Bi, and gradually stripped them of their soldiers. Their officer Tang Hong (唐宏), believing that Sun would eventually kill them, decided to save himself by falsely accusing Qin Yan and Bi of working in concert with Zhu Quanzhong the military governor of Xuanwu Circuit (宣武, headquartered in modern Kaifeng, Henan). In early 888, Sun put Qin Yan, Bi, and Zheng to death.

== Notes and references ==
- Old Book of Tang, vol. 182.
- Zizhi Tongjian, vols. 253, 255, 256, 257.
