= Qin Zongquan =

Chinese military and political figure during Tang dynasty

- Reign: 885 – 888/889
- Born: Unknown
- Died: April 1, 889
Full name
- Family name: Qín (秦); Given name: Zōngquán (宗權)
- Occupation: Military general, monarch, politician, rebel, warlord

Qin Zongquan (simplified Chinese: 秦宗权; traditional Chinese: 秦宗權; pinyin: Qín Zōngquán; died April 1, 889) was a Chinese military general, monarch, politician, rebel, and warlord during the Tang dynasty. He was later a claimant to the imperial throne, in competition with Emperor Xizong of Tang and, later, Emperor Xizong's brother Emperor Zhaozong, with his capital at Cai Prefecture (蔡州, in modern Zhumadian, Henan). At Qin's prime, he controlled most of modern Henan and parts of modern Hubei, Anhui, and Jiangsu, but he was eventually repeatedly defeated by the Tang general and warlord Zhu Quanzhong. His subordinates turned against him and delivered him to the Tang capital Chang'an, where he was executed.

== Background and seizure of Cai Prefecture ==
It is not known when Qin Zongquan was born. His family was from Cai Prefecture, which, at the start of his known career, was part of Zhongwu Circuit (忠武, headquartered in modern Xuchang, Henan), and Qin served as an officer at Zhongwu's capital Xu Prefecture (許州). In late 880, when the major agrarian rebel Huang Chao was poised to cross the Huai River north to attack the center of Tang dynasty territory, then-military governor (Jiedushi) of Zhongwu, Xue Neng (薛能), sent Qin to try to contain Huang's advance. However, Xue was then killed in a mutiny led by Zhou Ji. Hearing of Xue's death, Qin expelled the prefect of Cai Prefecture and seized it. When Emperor Xizong subsequently commissioned Zhou as Zhongwu's military governor (jiedushi), Zhou made Qin the prefect of Cai Prefecture.

Subsequently, Huang captured the Tang imperial capital Chang'an, forcing Emperor Xizong to flee to Chengdu. Huang established a new state of Qi as its emperor. Zhou initially submitted to Huang, but by summer 881 had been persuaded by the Tang eunuch general Yang Fuguang into redeclaring allegiance to Tang. Yang also persuaded Qin to send forces to participate in the campaign against Huang, and Qin sent 3,000 men, under the command of his officer Wang Shu (王淑) to join Yang's army. (Finding Wang insubordinate, however, Yang executed Wang and seized his troops.) Under Yang's suggestion, later in the year, Emperor Xizong created a new Fengguo Circuit out of Cai Prefecture and made Qin its defender (防禦使, Fangyushi). At a later point, Emperor Xizong gave Qin the greater title of military governor.

== As military governor and renegade ==
In 883, Huang Chao, under attack from a group of Tang Shatuo generals led by Li Keyong, was forced to abandon Chang'an and flee east. He had his general Meng Kai (孟楷) attack Cai Prefecture. Qin Zongquan engaged Meng but was defeated, and reacted by opening the city gates and submitting to Huang. He thereafter joined his forces to Huang's. They put Chen Prefecture (陳州, in modern Zhoukou, Henan) under siege, but were unable to capture it due to the defense by Chen's prefect Zhao Chou. In winter 883, when Huang was still sieging Chen, Qin himself put Xu Prefecture under siege, but was also unable to capture it. In spring 884, he also sent one of his younger brothers to attack Lu Prefecture (廬州, in modern Hefei, Anhui), and occupied Shucheng (舒城, in modern Lu'an, Anhui) for some time, before the prefect of Lu, Yang Xingmin, sent his officer Tian Jun to expel Qin Zongquan's brother.

By summer 884, Huang had been defeated, and he was killed by his nephew Lin Yan (林言). However, Qin did not resubmit to Tang authority, and instead sent troops to pillage the surrounding circuits. In particular, he attacked Zhu Quanzhong the military governor of Xuanwu Circuit (宣武, headquartered in modern Kaifeng, Henan), but with Zhu Xuan the military governor of Tianping Circuit (天平, in modern Tai'an, Shandong) coming to Zhu Quanzhong's aid, Qin was defeated, and he withdrew. Meanwhile, in winter 884, when another renegade Tang general, Lu Yanhong, was set to attack Xiang Prefecture (襄州, in modern Xiangfan, Hubei), Qin sent his officers Qin Gao (秦誥) and Zhao Deyin to aid Lu, and they captured Xiang Prefecture. Lu subsequently attacked Xu Prefecture and captured it, forcing Zhou Ji to flee, while Qin's forces took over Xiang Prefecture.

Around the same time, Qin was also sending other officers to attack surrounding circuits, with Chen Yan (陳彥) attacking Huainan Circuit (淮南, headquartered in modern Yangzhou, Jiangsu); Qin Zongxian (秦宗賢) attacking Jiangxi Circuit (江西, headquartered in modern Nanchang, Jiangxi); Qin Gao capturing Shannan East Circuit (山南東道, headquartered at Xiang Prefecture); Sun Ru capturing the Tang eastern capital Luoyang, as well as Shanguo Circuit (陝虢, headquartered in modern Sanmenxia, Henan); Zhang Zhi (張晊) capturing Ru (汝州, in modern Pingdingshan, Henan) and Zheng (鄭州, in modern Zhengzhou, Henan) Prefectures; and Lu Tang (盧瑭) attacking Xuanwu. It was said that wherever Qin's army went, it slaughtered, burned, raped, and pillaged the territory, in even crueler ways than Huang's army did. Further, the army did not carry food supplies, and it committed numerous acts of cannibalism. As, at that time, Emperor Xizong was planning to return from Chengdu to Chang'an but feared the display of force that Qin was making, he issued an edict trying to get Qin to resubmit, but Qin took no action on it.

In spring 885, Qin ordered a nearby prefect, Wang Xu the prefect of Guang Prefecture (光州, in modern Xinyang, Henan), to pay taxes to him. Wang was unable to due so due to lack of funds, and Qin, in anger, attacked him. Wang, in fear, forced the people of Guang and Shou (壽州, in modern Lu'an) to follow him south of the Yangtze River. Qin also attacked Ying (潁州, in modern Fuyang, Anhui) and Bo (亳州, in modern Bozhou, Anhui), but Zhu Quanzhong repelled his attack.

== As emperor ==
In spring 885, Qin Zongquan declared himself emperor. (The name of his state, as well as any era names he might have been used, was lost to history.) Emperor Xizong, in response, commissioned Shi Pu the military governor of Wuning Circuit (武寧, headquartered in modern Xuzhou, Jiangsu) as the overall commander of the operations against him, although initially neither Shi nor any other Tang general took much action against him.

Qin, after declaring himself emperor, continued his campaign to increase his territory. He sent his brother Qin Zongyan (秦宗言) to attack Jingnan Circuit (荊南, headquartered in modern Jingzhou, Hubei), while he captured Xu Prefecture, killing Lu Yanhong. Of the 20 surrounding prefectures, only Chen Prefecture, defended by Zhao Chou, and Xuanwu's capital Bian Prefecture (汴州), defended by Zhu Quanzhong, continued to hold out against him. As of spring 887, Qin, angry that he was continuously unable to defeat Zhu, prepared for a decisive attack on Bian Prefecture. Zhu responded by sending his officer Zhu Zhen (朱珍) to recruit soldiers in the east; Zhu Zhen returned with reinforcements and horses, allowing Zhu Quanzhong to defeat Qin Zongxian. When Qin Zongquan launched his major attack in summer 887, Zhu Quanzhong gathered the troops of Xuanwu and Yicheng (義成, headquartered in modern Anyang, Henan, which Zhu had seized earlier in the year) Circuits, as well as the aid troops led by Zhu Xuan and Zhu Xuan's cousin Zhu Jin (who had seized Taining Circuit (泰寧, headquartered in modern Jining, Shandong) by that point). The four circuits' joint troops dealt Qin's troops a major defeat at Bianxiao Village (邊孝村) just outside Bian's walls, causing Qin to flee. Upon hearing that Qin had been defeated, his officers who had seized Luoyang, Heyang (河陽, in modern Luoyang), as well as Xu, Ru, Huai (懷州, in modern Xinyang), Zheng, Shan (陝州, in modern Sanmenxia), and Guo (虢州, in modern Sanmenxia), abandoned the cities and fled as well. It was said that from this point on, Qin's strength began to wane.

With Huainan recently thrown into a state of confusion and war due to internecine battles between the military governor Gao Pian and Gao's officers Lü Yongzhi, Qin Yan, Yang Xingmin (whose name had been changed to Yang Xingmi by this point), and Bi Shiduo, among others, which resulted in a Yang Xingmi victory but the capital Yang Prefecture (揚州) and surrounding regions being laid waste, Qin Zongquan sent his brother Qin Zongheng (秦宗衡) and Sun Ru southeast to try to wrest the control of Huainan from Yang Xingmi. Soon, hearing of Qin Zongquan's defeat at Zhu Quanzhong's hands, Qin Zongheng tried to return to Cai Prefecture to aid Qin Zongquan, but Sun killed him and took over the army, subsequently taking over Huainan for some time but no longer following Qin Zongquan's orders. Meanwhile, in winter 887, Qin Zongquan recaptured Zheng Prefecture, while Zhao Deyin, whom Qin had made the military governor of Shannan East Circuit, captured Jingnan and killed the Tang military governor Zhang Gui, leaving his officer Wang Jianzhao in control of Jingnan's capital Jiangling Municipality.

In fall 888, the Tang general Cheng Rui attacked Jiangling and recaptured it, forcing Wang to flee. Upon losing Jingnan and realizing that Qin was in trouble, Zhao decided to switch loyalty to Tang and to enter into an alliance with Zhu Quanzhong, who had been made overall commander of the operations against Qin by this point. At Zhu's recommendation, then-reigning Emperor Zhaozong (Emperor Xizong's brother, who had succeeded him in early 888 after Emperor Xizong's death) commissioned Zhao the military governor of Shannan East (which was renamed Zhongyi) and Zhu's deputy. Meanwhile, Zhu, after seizing Luoyang and Heyang earlier in the year, decided to launch a decisive operation against Qin. He defeated Qin in a battle just south of Cai Prefecture, and Qin withdrew into Cai Prefecture to defend it against Zhu's siege. With Zhu's food supplies running low, he withdrew. After Zhu's withdrawal, Qin's forces took Xu Prefecture again.

== Removal and death ==
However, shortly after, around the new year 889, Qin Zongquan's officer Shen Cong (申叢) carried out a coup against him, seizing him, breaking his legs, and putting him under arrest. Shen submitted to Zhu Quanzhong, who commissioned him acting military governor. However, in spring 889, another officer, Guo Fan (郭璠), killed Shen (claiming to Zhu that Shen had considered reinstalling Qin) and delivered Qin to Bian Prefecture.

Zhu then delivered Qin to Chang'an. On April 1, Qin was executed by decapitation under a lone willow, with the mayor of Jingzhao Municipality (京兆, i.e., the Chang'an region) Sun Kui (孫揆) overseeing the execution. Right before the execution, Qin yelled out to Sun, "Minister, I, Qin Zongquan, was not committing treason. It was just that my faithfulness was not expressed well." Hearing those remarks, those who gathered to witness the execution burst out in laughter. His wife Lady Zhao was either decapitated with him, or whipped to death.

== Notes and references ==
- Old Book of Tang, vol. 200, part 2.
- New Book of Tang, vol. 225, part 3.
- Zizhi Tongjian, vols. 254, 255, 256, 257, 258.

Preceded by Emperor Xizong of Tang	Emperor of China (Henan); 885–889	Succeeded by Emperor Zhaozong of Tang
