= Lü Yongzhi =

Lü Yongzhi (呂用之; died December 29, 887) was a Chinese magician, military general, and politician during the late medieval Tang dynasty, who became trusted by Gao Pian the military governor (Jiedushi) of Huainan Circuit (淮南, headquartered in modern Yangzhou, Jiangsu) and became very powerful at Huainan, at one point becoming more powerful than Gao himself. Subsequently, Gao's officer Bi Shiduo rose in resistance, plunging the circuit into intense internecine warfare. Lü, after Bi defeated him, aligned himself with Yang Xingmi, but after Yang's victory over Bi and Qin Yan, Yang executed him.

== Background ==
It is not known when Lü Yongzhi was born, but it is known that he was from Poyang (鄱陽, in modern Shangrao, Jiangxi) and that he came from a family of tea merchants. Because of the family's merchant tradition, he had visited and was familiar with Huainan Circuit's capital Guangling (廣陵). After his father's death, he became dependent on his maternal uncle, but at some point stole his uncle's money and fled to Mount Jiuhua, where he became a student of the sorcerer Niu Honghui (牛弘徽), who taught him magic. Lü subsequently returned to Guangling and peddled herbs and medicines on the street. He became acquainted with the army officer Yu Gongchu (俞公楚), who was a close associate of the military governor Gao Pian. After he convinced Yu that his magical abilities were genuine, Yu introduced him to Gao. Gao, who was himself dabbling in magic, came to believe in Lü's abilities as well, particularly since Lü also made a number of policy recommendations to him. He thus made Lü an officer in his army and became close to Lü.

== Rise to power ==
After Lü Yongzhi gained Gao Pian's trusts, he began to bribe Gao's attendants to keep Gao under surveillance, so that he could falsely claim to Gao that what he knew was based on his magical powers. He also alienated Gao from those officers that Gao had previously been close to — causing Gao to strip Liang Zuan (梁纘) of his command, kill Chen Gong (陳珙) and his household, and distance himself from Feng Shou (馮綬), Dong Jin (董瑾), Yu Gongchu, and Yao Guili (姚歸禮). He further introduced fellow sorcerers Zhang Shouyi (張守一), Zhuge Yin (諸葛殷), and Xiao Sheng (蕭勝) to Gao, grouping together to seize more and more of the actual power at Huainan's headquarters. He encouraged Gao to spend much of the army's wealth on building temples, and further established a group of secret police to spy on the people, using what they found as excuses to incriminate people and seize their wealth. Under Lü's suggestion, Gao established an elite Moxie Corps (莫邪), with Lü and Zhang in command. Lü lived luxuriously, and gained a group of over 100 concubines, such that even with the great amount of wealth that Gao was giving him, he still had insufficient funds to maintain his households, so he embezzled the funds that Gao had access to as the director of Tang's governmental monopolies on salt and iron, for his own use. It was said that due to Lü's urging that Gao spend his time on seeking divinity, Gao no longer paid any attention to governance and rarely met his staff members, and the people began to not know who he was any more.

As it was Yu who initially introduced Lü to Gao, many of Gao's officers blamed Yu for this situation. Yu thus periodically met with Lü to urge him to change his ways, drawing Lü's resentment. Lü was also resentful of Yao for often publicly rebuking him and trying, on one occasion, to assassinate him. In 883, Lü decided to eliminate Yu and Yao. He had Gao issue an order that they attack the agrarian rebels at Shen County (慎縣, in modern Hefei, Anhui), and then falsely informed Yang Xingmin (who would later change his name to Yang Xingmi) the prefect of Lu Prefecture (廬州, in modern Hefei) that Yu and Yao were going to attack him. Yang reacted by ambushing Yu and Yao, killing them, and then informing Gao that Yu and Yao were intending to rebel. Gao, not knowing that this was all Lü's treachery, rewarded Yang. In 884, when Gao Pian's nephew Gao Yu (高澞) met with Gao Pian and submitted a list of 20 crimes of Lü's, Gao Pian confronted Lü with them, but Lü managed to convince Gao Pian that Gao Yu had only accused him of crimes because Gao Yu had previously tried to borrow money from Lü but Lü declined. Gao Pian expelled Gao Yu from his household, made him the prefect of Shu Prefecture (舒州, in modern Anqing, Anhui), and later, after Gao Yu suffered defeats at the hands of agrarian rebels, executed Gao Yu.

In 886, when Gao supported the claim of the pretender Li Yun for the Tang throne (in competition with the commonly recognized Emperor Xizong), Li Yun, whose main proponent Zhu Mei then-controlled the imperial capital Chang'an and forced Emperor Xizong to flee, bestowed on Gao various honors, but also gave Lü the title of military governor of Lingnan East Circuit (嶺南東道, headquartered in modern Guangzhou, Guangdong). Because of this title, Lü, who made no attempts to report to Lingnan East, openly established his own headquarters, rivaling Gao's. Gao began to realize that Lü had too much power, but also was apprehensive that he no longer had enough power himself to eliminate Lü. However, Lü nevertheless realized Gao's loss of trust in him, and therefore began to plot to murder Gao and take over the circuit, although he did not carry out the plot at the time. Gao's officers have, by this point, all fearful of Lü's authority. Bi Shiduo, who had formerly been a follower of the agrarian rebel Huang Chao, was particularly anxious because of that fact. Further, Bi had a dispute with Lü over an incident involving one of Bi's concubines, who was known for being beautiful; because of her reputation of beauty, Lü had wanted to see her appearance, and Bi refused, but on one occasion when Bi was not at home, Lü went to see her anyway, and Bi, in anger, threw her out of the household.

== Battle against Bi Shiduo ==
In summer 887, the warlord Qin Zongquan, who had rebelled against Emperor Xizong's rule at Cai Prefecture (蔡州, in modern Zhumadian, Henan), was sending generals out to attack the nearby circuits. Gao, hearing news that Qin was sending an army his way, commissioned Bi to take the special Baiqi Corps (百騎) to Gaoyou to prepare to resist the Qin advance. As Bi was about to leave, Lü treated him especially well, which led Bi to fear that Lü was intending to get his guards down to act against him. Even Bi's mother was fearful, and she sent a messenger to him to state, "If something like that happens, you should strive for yourself. Do not worry about your mother or children." When Bi consulted the defender of Gaoyou, Zhang Shenjian (張神劍), whose daughter had married Bi's son, Zhang believed that Lü would not act against Bi. However, at that time, one of Gao's sons wanted Bi to act against Lü so that he could use this chance to show Lü's evil nature, intentionally sent Bi a message stating, "Lü Yongzhi had frequently met with the Chancellor [(i.e., Gao, who carried an honorary chancellor title)] and wants to act against you. An order has already been sent to Minister Zhang [(i.e., Zhang, who carried an honorary minister title)]. Be careful!" Bi confronted Zhang, who knew nothing about it, but subsequently agreed, along with Bi and Bi's friend Zheng Hanzhang (鄭漢章), to rise against Lü.

On May 1, 887, Bi and Zheng, after issuing public declarations denouncing Lü, departed Gaoyou and advanced toward Yang Prefecture. Lü oversaw the defense and was initially able to repel Bi's attacks. Bi, who believed that his army was not strong enough to capture Yang Prefecture, sent a letter to Qin Yan, who was then the governor (觀察使, Guanchashi) of Xuanshe Circuit (宣歙, headquartered in modern Xuancheng, Anhui), offering the military governorship of Huainan to him and asking for aid. Qin sent his officer Qin Chou (秦稠) to reinforce Bi. Meanwhile, Gao and Lü had a falling out inside the city, and Gao put up a defense at his headquarters, commanded by his nephew Gao Jie (高傑), to guard against Lü. Gao Pian subsequently sent the officer Shi E (石鍔) to meet with Bi, along with Bi's youngest son. Bi ordered his young son to return to Gao Pian, stating, "If the Chancellor executes Lü Yongzhi and Zhang Shouyi to show me his intent, I will surely not turn back on his grace, and I am willing to have my wife and children serve as hostages." Gao Pian, worried that Lü might preemptively slaughter Bi's family, put Bi's family under protective custody.

On May 17, Bi made a fierce attack on Yang Prefecture, but Lü's counterattack defeated him. However, at this juncture, Gao Jie launched an attack from Gao Pian's headquarters, intending to capture Lü to deliver to Bi. Lü, hearing the news, abandoned Yang Prefecture and fled. Bi took over Yang Prefecture, slaughtered Lü's associates, put Gao and his family under effective arrest, and welcomed Qin Yan to Yang Prefecture to take over as military governor.

After leaving Yang Prefecture, Lü attacked Zheng's base of Huaikou (淮口, in modern Huai'an, Jiangsu), where Zheng had left his wife in charge, but could not capture it. Meanwhile, during the siege, Lü had issued an order in Gao's name making Yang Xingmi the commander of the circuit forces and ordering him to come to Yang Prefecture's aid. Yang mobilized the troops of Lu Prefecture and that of neighboring He Prefecture (和州, in modern Chaohu, Anhui) and headed for Yang Prefecture. When Lü heard that Yang had arrived at Tianchang (天長, in modern Chuzhou, Anhui), he went there to rendezvous with Yang, as did Zhang, when he got into a dispute with Bi over the pillages and decided to join Yang as well.

== Alliance with Yang Xingmi and death ==
Yang Xingmi put Yang Prefecture under siege for months, but could not capture it, despite a terrible famine that developed inside the city. (During the siege, Qin Yan put Gao Pian and his family to death.) Yang thus considered withdrawing. However, on November 18, Lü Yongzhi's former subordinate Zhang Shenwei (張審威) opened the city gates and welcomed Yang's army in. The city thus fell to Yang; Qin and Bi Shiduo fled.

Meanwhile, during the siege, Lü had falsely claimed to Yang that he had a secret stash of silver that he would offer to Yang's soldiers as rewards when the city fell. After the city fell and Lü failed to come up with the silver, Yang put him under arrest and had Yang's subordinate and friend Tian Jun interrogate Lü. Lü confessed to previously planning to murder Gao and take over the circuit. On the same day (December 29), Yang had Lü put to death by cutting him in two at the waist and slaughtered his followers. It was said that those who hated Lü came to cut off the flesh off his bones and, quickly, only a skeleton was left.

== Notes and references ==
- Old Book of Tang, vol. 182.
- New Book of Tang, vol. 224, part 2.
- Zizhi Tongjian, vols. 254, 255, 256, 257.
