= Bi Shiduo =

Chinese military officer and rebel

- Traditional Chinese: 畢師鐸
- Simplified Chinese: 毕师铎
Transcriptions
Standard Mandarin
- Hanyu Pinyin: Bì Shīduó
- Wade–Giles: Pi Shih-tuo

Bi Shiduo (died March 2, 888) was a Chinese military officer and rebel of the late Tang dynasty. He initially was part of the agrarian rebellions of Wang Xianzhi and Huang Chao, but later became a Tang officer. His rebellion in 887 against Gao Pian the military governor (Jiedushi) of Huainan Circuit (淮南, headquartered in modern Yangzhou, Jiangsu) would be the start of sustained warfare that left the once-wealthy circuit in devastation.

== Life ==
=== Early life ===
It is not known when Bi Shiduo was born, but it is known that he was from Yuanqu (within modern Heze, Shandong), where Huang Chao was from as well.

=== Rebellion against the Tang ===
When Wang Xianzhi started a rebellion against the reign of Emperor Xizong in 874, Bi joined the rebellion. He was known for his abilities in horsemanship and archery, and his followers referred to him as "the Kestrel." After Wang Xianzhi's death in 878, it appeared that Bi followed Huang. In 879, when Gao Pian, who was then the military governor of Zhenhai Circuit (鎮海, headquartered in modern Zhenjiang, Jiangsu), sent the officers Zhang Lin (張璘) and Liang Zuan (梁纉) to attack Huang and repeatedly defeated Huang, Bi, along with several other key Huang followers, including Qin Yan, Li Hanzhi, and Xu Qing (許勍), surrendered to Gao, and thereafter became a follower to Gao.

=== Service under Gao Pian ===
It was said that in subsequent confrontations where Gao Pian had victories over Huang Chao, Bi Shiduo was a major contributor to the victories, along with Liang Zuan. Gao thus treated him well. After Gao was transferred to Huainan Circuit in 879, it appeared that Bi followed him there, as Bi was referred to as a Huainan officer in summer 880. By that point, the tide of war had turned against Gao, as Huang had killed Zhang Lin in battle and was advancing north, approaching Huainan's capital Yang Prefecture (揚州). Bi, warning him that Huang's intentions were to further advance north to ravage the center of the Tang state, suggested that Gao launch another attack to intercept Huang. However, Gao, distressed by Zhang's defeat and death, did not make any attempt to stop Huang, who subsequently continued his advance toward the eastern capital Luoyang and the imperial capital Chang'an.

=== Rebellion against Gao Pian ===
By 887, Gao Pian, who had trusted the sorcerer Lü Yongzhi, had effectively entrusted the affairs of the circuit to Lü, such that even his long-time officers Yu Gongchu (俞公楚) and Yao Guili (姚歸禮) were killed due to false accusations that Lü laid against them, and this led to the officers of the circuit becoming fearful of death. Bi Shiduo was particularly anxious, because of his own status as a former follower of Huang Chao's. Further, Bi had a dispute with Lü over an incident involving one of Bi's concubines, who was known for being beautiful; because of her reputation of beauty, Lü had wanted to see her appearance, and Bi refused, but on one occasion when Bi was not at home, Lü went to see her anyway, and Bi, in anger, threw her out of the household.

In summer 887, the warlord Qin Zongquan, who had rebelled against Emperor Xizong's rule at Cai Prefecture (蔡州, in modern Zhumadian, Henan), was sending generals out to attack the nearby circuits. Gao, hearing news that Qin was sending an army his way, commissioned Bi to take the special Baiqi Corps (百騎) to Gaoyou to prepare to resist the Qin advance. As Bi was about to leave, Lü treated him especially well, which led Bi to fear that Lü was intending to get his guards down to act against him. Even Bi's mother was fearful, and she sent a messenger to him to state, "If something like that happens, you should strive for yourself. Do not worry about your mother or children." When Bi consulted the defender of Gaoyou, Zhang Shenjian (張神劍), whose daughter had married Bi's son, Zhang believed that Lü would not act against Bi. However, at that time, one of Gao's sons wanted Bi to act against Lü so that he could use this chance to show Lü's evil nature, intentionally sent Bi a message stating, "Lü Yongzhi had frequently met with the Chancellor [(i.e., Gao, who carried an honorary chancellor title)] and wants to act against you. An order has already been sent to Minister Zhang [(i.e., Zhang, who carried an honorary minister title)]. Be careful!" Bi confronted Zhang, who knew nothing about it, but subsequently agreed, along with Bi and Bi's friend Zheng Hanzhang (鄭漢章), to rise against Lü.

On May 1, 887, Bi and Zheng, after issuing public declarations denouncing Lü, departed Gaoyou and advanced toward Yang Prefecture. Lü oversaw the defense and was initially able to repel Bi's attacks. Bi, who believed that his army was not strong enough to capture Yang Prefecture, sent a letter to Qin Yan, who was then the governor (觀察使, Guanchashi) of Xuanshe Circuit (宣歙, headquartered in modern Xuancheng, Anhui), offering the military governorship of Huainan to him and asking for aid. Qin sent his officer Qin Chou (秦稠) to reinforce Bi. Meanwhile, Gao and Lü had a falling out inside the city, and Gao put up a defense at his headquarters, commanded by his nephew Gao Jie (高傑), to guard against Lü. Gao Pian subsequently sent the officer Shi E (石鍔) to meet with Bi, along with Bi's youngest son. Bi ordered his young son to return to Gao Pian, stating, "If the Chancellor executes Lü Yongzhi and Zhang Shouyi [(張守一, a close association of Lü's and also a sorcerer that Gao trusted)] to show me his intent, I will surely not turn back on his grace, and I am willing to have my wife and children serve as hostages." Gao Pian, worried that Lü might preemptively slaughter Bi's family, put Bi's family under protective custody.

On May 17, Bi made a fierce attack on Yang Prefecture, but Lü's counterattack defeated him. However, at this juncture, Gao Jie launched an attack from Gao Pian's headquarters, intending to capture Lü to deliver to Bi. Lü, hearing the news, abandoned Yang Prefecture and fled. The next day, Bi made a show of force by having his troops plunder the city. Gao was forced to meet him and make him deputy military governor, and subsequently transferred all authority over the circuit to him. Bi subsequently sent a letter to Qin Yan, requesting that he come to Yang Prefecture quickly to take his post. (This was despite contrary advice given to Bi that he should instead honor Gao Pian as the titular military governor and refuse to let Qin take the post — pointing out that he would lose power if Qin arrived, and that the other prefects throughout Huainan would surely not willingly serve under Qin, thus leading to more warfare and bloodshed.) He also put Gao and Gao's entire household under house arrest. Upon Qin's arrival, he made Bi the commander of the Huainan forces, but moved his office outside the headquarters.

=== Defeat ===
Just as the advice rejected by Bi Shiduo predicted, Yang Xingmi the prefect of Lu Prefecture (廬州, in modern Hefei, Anhui) was not willing to accept Qin Yan, and he, with aid from Sun Duan (孫端) the prefect of He Prefecture (和州, in modern Chaohu, Anhui), headed toward Yang Prefecture. Lü joined forces with him, as did Zhang Shenjian (who had been angered by Bi's refusal to share the material plunders with him). Yang Xingmi put Yang Prefecture under siege, starting June 20.

Qin tried to have Bi and Zheng Hanzhang lead a counterattack against Yang Xingmi, but Yang Xingmi decisively defeated them, leading Qin not to dare to launch another counterattack against the siege afterwards. Concerned that Gao Pian might be using witchcraft to curse him and his army, he also put Gao and his entire family to death. The siege continued for months, such that the city fell into a massive famine, and Qin's soldiers from Xuanshe Circuit were eating human flesh as food. Nevertheless, Yang Xingmi was unable to capture the city and considered withdrawal. However, on November 18, Lü's associate Zhang Shenwei (張審威) opened the city gates and welcomed Yang Xingmi's forces in. Hearing the news, Qin and Bi consulted the Buddhist nun Wang Fengxian (王奉仙), whom they believed to have prophetic abilities; Wang urged them to flee, and they did so, allowing Yang Xingmi to take over the city.

Qin and Bi initially tried to flee to Dongtang (東塘, near Yang Prefecture), but the general Zhang Xiong, who then occupied Dongtang, refused to receive them. They considered heading south back to Xuanshe's headquarters Xuan Prefecture (宣州). However, by that point, Qin Zongquan's army, commanded by his brother Qin Zongheng (秦宗衡), had arrived in the vicinity, and Qin Zongheng sent messengers to Qin Yan and Bi, inviting them to join forces against Yang Xingmi. They then joined Qin Zongheng.

Soon thereafter, Qin Zongheng was assassinated by his deputy Sun Ru, who took over the army. Sun, along with Qin Yan and Bi, then attacked Gaoyou, capturing it, forcing Zhang Shenjian to flee to Yang Prefecture, where Yang Xingmi killed him. However, Sun did not trust Qin Yan and Bi, and gradually stripped them of their soldiers. Their officer Tang Hong (唐宏), believing that Sun would eventually kill them, decided to save himself by falsely accusing Qin Yan and Bi of working in concert with Zhu Quanzhong the military governor of Xuanwu Circuit (宣武, headquartered in modern Kaifeng, Henan). In early 888, Sun put Qin Yan, Bi, and Zheng to death.
