= Gao Pian =

Chinese general, poet, and politician during the Tang dynasty

Gao Pian (Chinese: 高駢; pinyin: Gāo Pián; 821? – 24 September 887), courtesy name Qianli (千里), formally the Prince of Bohai (渤海王), was a Chinese military general, poet, and politician of the Tang dynasty. He initially gained renown for defeating Nanzhao incursions, but later became known for his failure to repel the rebel army under Huang Chao and his mismanagement of Huainan Circuit (淮南, headquartered in modern Yangzhou, Jiangsu), which he governed as military governor (jiedushi). A rebellion against him in 887 resulted in intense internal warfare in Huainan Circuit and his imprisonment by Qin Yan, who eventually put him to death.

== Background ==
Gao Pian might have been born in 821. He was a grandson of the famed general Gao Chongwen, who had suppressed the rebellion of Liu Pi during the reign of Emperor Xianzong. Gao Pian's father was named Gao Chengming (高承明), and served as an officer of the imperial Shence Armies. It was said that, although Gao Pian's family had served for generations in the Shence Armies, he was good at writing in his youth and often had discussions with Confucian scholars. He was also considered intelligent, and was respected by the honored officers in the Shence Armies, including the eunuchs who commanded the Shence Armies. At some point, he became the discipline officer in the Right Shence Army. While he served at the Shence Armies, he had a friendship with fellow officer Zhou Bao, and he honored Zhou as an older brother.

Early in the reign of Emperor Xianzong's grandson Emperor Yizong, there was a Dangxiang rebellion. Gao was put in command of 10,000 men stationed at Changwu (長武, in modern Xianyang, Shaanxi). It was said that few officers distinguished themselves against the Dangxiang at the time, but Gao often took opportunities to attack the Dangxiang and was often successful. He was thereafter promoted to be the prefect and defender of Qin Prefecture (秦州, in modern Tianshui, Gansu), and was again successful there.

== Campaign against Dali at Annan ==
In 863, a major attack by Dali forces captured Annan District (安南, headquartered in modern Hanoi, Vietnam). Several successive Tang operations failed to make any headway against Dali forces. In 864, the chancellor Xiahou Zi recommended Gao Pian, who had by that point become a general of the imperial guards, to take over the Tang forces then under Zhang Yin (張茵) the military governor of Lingnan West Circuit (嶺南西道, headquartered in modern Nanning, Guangxi), to attack Annan. He was given the title of protector general of Annan.

As of fall 865, Gao was still training his army at Haimen (海門, in modern Hai Phong, Vietnam) and not yet attacking Annan's capital Jiaozhi (交趾, modern Hanoi). The eunuch monitor of his army, Li Weizhou (李維周) disliked Gao and wanted him to leave, so Li hurried Gao into action. Gao thus agreed to take 5,000 men to head west toward Annan and asked Li to follow up with the remaining forces, but after Gao departed, Li took over the remaining troops and did not render him any aid. Hearing that Gao was arriving, the Dali emperor Qiulong (酋龍) sent his general Yang Jisi (楊緝思) to aid the general defending Annan, Duan Qiuqian (段酋遷). Gao, meanwhile, was joined by the eunuch Wei Zhongzai (韋仲宰), and their joint forces repeatedly defeated Dali forces. When his reports of victory reached Haimen, however, Li Weizhou intercepted them and refused to relay them to the imperial capital Chang'an. As a result, Emperor Yizong was surprised that Gao was submitting no reports at all. Li then submitted a report stating that Gao was stopping at Feng Prefecture (峯州, in modern Vĩnh Phúc Province, Vietnam) and refusing to advance. Emperor Yizong was outraged, and in summer 866, sent the general Wang Yanquan (王晏權) to replace Gao, intending to summon Gao back to Chang'an to punish him.

Receiving the order to turn his command over to Wang, Gao left his army, which by this point was sieging Jiaozhi, with Wei, while heading back to Haimen to meet Wang and turn over the command. Meanwhile, though, the messengers that Gao and Wei had sent previously to submit reports to Emperor Yizong, the officer Zeng Gun (曾袞) and the eunuch Wang Huizan (王惠贊), believing that Li Weizhou would again intercept them, took a roundabout route and avoided Li's and Wang Yanquan's camp, and then headed for Chang'an. Upon Zeng's and Wang Huizan's arrival in Chang'an, Emperor Yizong was pleased by the reports, and issued another order promoting Gao and allowing him to keep his command. When Gao received the edict at Haimen, he returned to the Jiaozhi front—where Li Weizhou and Wang Yanquan had taken over but had lifted the siege. He resumed the siege, and finally captured it in winter 866, killing Duan and the local chieftain Zhu Daogu (朱道古), who was allied with Dali forces. Upon Gao's capture of Jiaozhi, Emperor Yizong converted Annan District to a new circuit, Jinghai Circuit, and commissioned him the military governor of Jinghai. It was said that Gao then rebuilt Jiaozhi's defenses such that Dali did not attack again. He further carried out a major project to remove obstacles for sea transportation between Jinghai and Lingnam East Circuit (嶺南東道, headquartered in modern Kwangzhou, Kwangdung), such that the difficulties for supplying Jiaozhi in the past were removed.

== As military governor of Tianping, Xichuan, and Jingnan Circuits ==
In 868, Gao Pian was recalled to Chang'an to serve as a general of the imperial guards. At his recommendation, his grandnephew Gao Xun (高潯), who fought in the campaign against Dali and had much contributions, was made the military governor of Jinghai to replace him. Gao Pian was subsequently made the military governor of Tianping Circuit (天平, headquartered in modern Tai'an, Shandong) and was said to have governed it well. In 873, when Emperor Yizong died and was succeeded by his son Emperor Xizong, Gao was still at Tianping, and was given the honorary chancellor title of Tong Zhongshu Menxia Pingzhangshi (同中書門下平章事).

In 874, Dali launched a major attack on Tang's Xichuan Circuit (西川, headquartered in modern Chengdu, Sichuan), and the Tang military governor of Xichuan, Niu Cong (牛叢), was unable to resist the attack. Dali forces reached Xichuan's capital Chengdu Municipality and withdrew, but Niu, in fear of another Dali attack, gathered the people of the surrounding regions into Chengdu. Emperor Xizong ordered several circuits to send forces to aid Xichuan, while ordering Gao to head to Xichuan to handle the matters involving Dali. He subsequently made Gao the military governor of Xichuan to replace Niu, as well as the mayor of Chengdu. Gao, realizing that he was looking at a potential major epidemic if the people were all confined to the city of Chengdu, ordered, even before he could reach Chengdu, that the city gates be opened and the people allowed to exit, and it was said that the people were initially very pleased by his arrival. Upon arrival in spring 875, Gao launched a minor retributive strike against Dali, and then built a number of key forts on the border with Dali. It was said that because of his defensive buildup, Dali did not further make attacks against Xichuan, although Gao's petition to launch a major attack against Dali was rejected by Emperor Xizong.

However, Gao soon precipitated a mutiny against him. When Dali had previously attacked Chengdu in 870, the officer Yang Qingfu (楊慶復) had recruited a group of soldiers known as the "Raiders" (突將) to aid in the defense of Chengdu. Upon Gao's arrival, he withdrew the commissions of the Raiders, and even stopped supplying them with food. He, a devout Taoist, further angered the soldiers by employing sorcery before battles and announcing the reason why sorcery was needed as that the Xichuan soldiers were weak and cowardly. He also withdrew commissions from officials who had initially served as non-commissioned administrators, and employed heavy punishment. In summer 875, the Raiders attacked Gao's headquarters, although Gao hid himself and was not injured in the attack. Gao thereafter issued a public apology restoring the Raiders' commissions and salaries. Later that month, at night, he had the Raiders and their families arrested and massacred. A woman, before she was executed, was said to have proclaimed thus against Gao:

Gao Pian, you, without good cause, stripped the officers and soldiers who accomplished much of their commissions, clothes, and food, and this angered everyone. You did not examine yourself, but instead used trickery to kill nearly 10,000 innocents. How would Heaven, Earth, the spirits, and the gods permit you to do so? I will make an accusation to Shangdi against you, so one day your family will be slaughtered like mine, you will be subjected to false accusations and humiliation like I, and you will be subjected to fear and distress like I!

Gao was said to have even considered executing Raiders who were not at Chengdu at the time of the mutiny, and he only stopped when his subordinate Wang Yin (王殷) pointed out that they could not have participated in the mutiny, and that he, as a Taoist, should be more merciful.

In 876, Gao built a ring of outer walls for Chengdu. He also sent the Buddhist monk Jingxian (景先) to Dali, assuring peace and that Tang would eventually give Qiulong a Tang princess to marry. It was said that because of these initiatives, Dali made no attempt to interfere with his defensive buildup.

In 878, Gao was transferred to be the military governor of Jingnan Circuit (荊南, headquartered in modern Jingzhou, Hubei). He was also made the director of the salt and iron monopolies and the food supplies for the two capitals (i.e., Chang'an and Luoyang).

== As military governor of Zhenhai Circuit ==
In 878, after the general Zeng Yuanyu (曾元裕) defeated and killed the agrarian rebel Wang Xianzhi, Wang's followers scattered, and a substantial portion pillaged Zhenhai Circuit (鎮海, headquartered in modern Zhenjiang, Jiangsu). Because many of Wang's followers were from Tianping Circuit, and Gao was respected by the Tianping people, Emperor Xizong transferred Gao to Zhenhai Circuit to serve as its military governor, as well as the prefect of its capital Run Prefecture (潤州). He was also given the honorific title of acting Sikong (司空, one of the Three Excellencies) and created the Duke of Yan, hoping that Wang's followers would submit to him. Most of Wang's followers, however, joined another rebel leader, Huang Chao. In 879, Gao sent his officers Zhang Lin (張璘) and Liang Zuan (梁纘) to attack Huang, and they had a victory over Huang. A number of Huang's followers surrendered to Zhang and Liang, including Qin Yan, Bi Shiduo, and Li Hanzhi. This defeat caused Huang to head south, toward Lingnan East Circuit.

With Huang approaching Lingnan East's capital Guang Prefecture (廣州), Gao submitted a petition to Emperor Xizong. He suggested that with Zhang stationed at Chen Prefecture (郴州, in modern Chenzhou, Hunan) and Wang Zhongren (王重任) at Xun (循州, in modern Huizhou, Guangdong) and Chao (潮州, in modern Chaozhou, Guangdong) Prefectures, he could take his own forces and head directly toward Guang Prefecture to face Huang. He further proposed that the chancellor Wang Duo, who had been put in charge of the operations against Huang, station his troops at Wu (梧州, in modern Wuzhou, Guangxi), Gui (桂州, in modern Guilin, Guangxi), Zhao (昭州, in modern Guilin), and Yong (永州, in modern Yongzhou, Hunan) Prefectures to intercept Huang when the latter flees. Emperor Xizong, however, declined Gao's proposal. Gao subsequently captured Guang Prefecture and held it for some time. Meanwhile, Emperor Xizong transferred Gao to Huainan Circuit to serve as its military governor; Gao also continued to serve as the director of the salt and iron monopolies and food supplies for the two capitals. Zhou Bao replaced him at Zhenhai.

== As military governor of Huainan Circuit ==
=== Campaign against Huang Chao ===
After Gao Pian was transferred to Huainan Circuit, Zhang Lin continued to have success against Huang Chao. As a result, the former chancellor Lu Xi, who had previously recommended Gao to serve as the overall commander against Huang, was again made chancellor. Meanwhile, Gao recruited 70,000 soldiers to add to the ranks of the soldiers under his command, and was much honored for his success against Huang.

In 880, with the imperial treasury drained by the campaigns against agrarian rebels, the director of finances suggested that the rich merchants and the foreign merchants be forced to loan 50% of their assets to the imperial treasury. Gao spoke against the proposal, pointing out that with the empire afflicted by widespread famine and the people joining the agrarian rebels in droves, only the merchants still supported the imperial government, and that this proposal would turn them against the imperial government as well. Emperor Xizong thus cancelled the plan.

In summer 880, Huang, who was returning north from Guang Prefecture, was stuck at Xin Prefecture (信州, in modern Shangrao, Jiangxi), and his troops were stricken by a plague. At that time, Zhang was set to attack him, and Huang was unable to resist such an attack. He therefore submitted much gold to Zhang, and further wrote Gao, offering to surrender to Gao. Gao, hoping to accept Huang's surrender as his accomplishment and further capture Huang by trickery, offered to recommend Huang as a military governor. Further, although reinforcements were arriving at Huainan from Zhaoyi (昭義, headquartered in modern Changzhi, Shanxi), Ganhua (感化, headquartered in modern Xuzhou, Jiangsu), and Yiwu (義武, headquartered in modern Baoding, Hebei) Circuits, Gao, not wanting to have his accomplishment be divided, submitted a petition stating that he no longer needed the assistance and returned the reinforcements. When Huang found out that Gao's reinforcements had left Huainan, he cut off relations with Gao and challenged Huainan forces to a battle. Gao, in anger, ordered Zhang to attack, but surprisingly, Huang prevailed over Zhang in the battle and killed Zhang, and his fortunes were revived.

In fall 880, Huang crossed the Yangtze River at Caishi (采石, in modern Ma'anshan, Anhui) and headed into Huainan territory. Despite Bi Shiduo's urging to engage Huang, Gao had become fearful of Huang after Zhang's death and refused to engage Huang. Gao, instead, sent urgent pleas to the imperial government for aid—disappointing the imperial government in that it was hopeful that Gao would be able to destroy Huang by himself. Emperor Xizong issued an edict rebuking Gao for returning the reinforcements, and Gao submitted another petition satirizing Emperor Xizong by pointing out that Emperor Xizong approved his offer to return the reinforcements. Gao thereafter claimed to be ill and refused to engage Huang. Thereafter, the relationship between the imperial government chilled considerably. Meanwhile, with Gao refusing to engage, the imperial general Cao Quanzhen (曹全晸), with only 6,000 men against Huang's 150,000 men, tried to hold off the Huang advance, but was unable to do so. Subsequently, when a mutiny occurred at Zhongwu Circuit (忠武, headquartered in modern Xuchang, Henan) and Zhongwu's military governor Xue Neng (薛能) was killed, imperial forces there scattered, leaving no defenses against Huang's advances toward Luoyang and Chang'an. Around the new year 881, Emperor Xizong, with Huang's forces approaching Chang'an, abandoned it and fled to Xichuan Circuit. Upon reaching there in spring 881, Emperor Xizong still was hopeful that Gao would launch an army to recapture the two capitals, and therefore issued an edict authorizing Gao to commission generals and officials as he saw fit, but this was not sufficient to entice Gao to launch his troops. Meanwhile, upon Huang's entry into Chang'an, Huang declared himself the emperor of a new state of Qi.

Meanwhile, with two wild pheasants flying into the offices of Huainan's capital county Guangling County (廣陵), the sorcerers that Gao trusted indicated that this was a sign of ill fortune, that the offices would soon be empty. Gao thus tried to dispel the misfortune by mobilizing his troops and claiming that he was ready to attack Huang. He exited the city with 80,000 men and stationed himself at Dongtang (東塘), just east of the city, but refused to advance further. He also ordered the nearby circuits' forces to join him, but Zhou Bao discovering that Gao had no actual intent to attack Huang, Zhou refused to mobilize Zhenhai troops and refused to join Gao, believing that Gao was intending to act against him. The two exchanged testy letters, and thereafter, their friendship was completely gone. Gao subsequently used Zhou's hostility as the excuse to demobilize.

=== Decline and death ===
With Gao Pian, while nominally serving as the overall commander against Huang Chao, refusing to act against Huang's Qi state, Wang Duo, who was then again chancellor and with Emperor Xizong at Xichuan, offered to lead the operations against Qi. Emperor Xizong agreed, and, in spring 882, made Wang the overall commander against Qi instead, stripping that title from Gao, but allowing him to remain the military governor of Huainan and the director of the monopolies. By this point, Gao had become very trusting of the sorcerer Lü Yongzhi, as well as Lü's associates Zhang Shouyi (張守一) and Zhuge Yin (諸葛殷), such that Lü was, in effect, taking over control of the circuit's governance, and anyone who dared to speak against Lü suffered death.

In summer 882, Emperor Xizong stripped Gao of his authorities as the director of the monopolies—thus depriving him of a major source of revenues—and although he bestowed on Gao the honorary chancellor title of Shizhong (侍中) and created Gao the Prince of Bohai, Gao was still incensed. He submitted an angry and rude petition, complaining that he was not given sufficient authority, complaining that Wang Duo and Wang's deputy Cui Anqian were incompetent, and comparing Emperor Xizong to such failed leaders as the Qin dynasty's Ziying and the Han dynasty's Gengshi Emperor. Emperor Xizong responded harshly, in an edict drafted by the chancellor Zheng Tian, and thereafter, Gao refused to submit any revenues to the imperial government.

In 885, with Huang destroyed and Emperor Xizong returned to Chang'an, the powerful eunuch Tian Lingzi, who controlled imperial governance and who had a dispute with Wang Chongrong the military governor of Hezhong Circuit (河中, in modern Yuncheng, Shanxi), tried to remove Wang by transferring him to Tianping Circuit. Wang, believing himself to be unjustly punished (as he had contributed much to Qi's destruction and the recapture of Chang'an) refused to be transferred to Tianping. When Wang and his ally Li Keyong the military governor of Hedong Circuit (河東, headquartered in modern Taiyuan, Shanxi) subsequently defeating Tian's allies Zhu Mei the military governor of Jingnan Circuit (靜難, headquartered in modern Xianyang, Shaanxi) and Li Changfu the military governor of Fengxiang Circuit (鳳翔, headquartered in modern Baoji, Shaanxi), the Hezhong and Hedong forces approached Chang'an, and Emperor Xizong was forced to flee to Xingyuan (興元, in modern Hanzhong, Shaanxi). With the imperial officials concluding that Tian was the root of all of the imperial government's troubles, most of them refused to follow Emperor Xizong to Xingyuan. Zhu took the opportunity to proclaim a distant relative of Emperor Xizong's, Li Yun the Prince of Xiang, regent. Zhu, hoping to turn Gao into an ally, had Li Yun issue an edict restoring the titles of overall commander and director of the monopolies to Gao. Gao, in response, submitted a petition requesting that Li Yun take the throne, and Li Yun subsequently did so.

Meanwhile, Gao was beginning to realize that Lü had, in effect, becoming the ruler of Huainan, and that he was unable to exercise his own power independently. He tried to curb Lü's powers, and Lü started planning to eventually remove Gao and replace Gao himself. Meanwhile, it was said that various signs of misfortune were appearing at Huainan's capital Yang Prefecture, but when Zhou Bao was forced to flee Run Prefecture after a mutiny against him in 887, Gao believed that the signs of misfortune pointed to Zhou, and believed himself to be safe.

In summer 887, though, with Qin Zongquan, a former Tang general who had proclaimed himself emperor at Cai Prefecture (蔡州, in modern Zhumadian, Henan), preparing an attack on Huainan Circuit, Gao prepared to defend against Qin's attack. At this time, though, Bi, who was one of the commanders commissioned to resist Qin, came to believe that Lü was going to act against him next, and therefore gathered his forces, along with fellow officers Zheng Hanzhang (鄭漢章) and Zhang Shenjian (張神劍) and rose against the headquarters forces then nominally under Gao but actually under Lü's control. Bi's forces put Yang Prefecture under siege. With Bi proclaiming that he would surrender himself if Gao put Lü and Zhang Shouyi to death, Gao, fearing that Lü would slaughter Bi's family and precipitate a further battle, took Bi's family under his own protection. From this point on, the battle for Yang Prefecture effectively became a three-way battle between Bi, Gao, and Lü.

With Bi's forces unable to capture Yang Prefecture quickly, however, Bi sought aid from Qin Yan, who was then the governor (觀察使, Guanchashi) of Xuanshe Circuit (宣歙, headquartered in modern Xuancheng, Anhui). Qin sent his officer Qin Chou (秦稠) to aid Bi. Soon, Yang Prefecture fell, and Lü fled. Bi briefly took control of the headquarters, before turning it over to Qin Yan as he promised. Qin Yan and Bi then put Gao and his family members under arrest at a Taoist temple.

Meanwhile, Lü, now outside Yang Prefecture, issued a letter in Gao's name summoning the officer Yang Xingmi, then the prefect of Lu Prefecture (廬州, in modern Hefei, Anhui) to aid him. Yang gathered the troops of Lu Prefecture and nearby He Prefecture (和州, in modern Chaohu, Anhui) and headed for Yang Prefecture. Yang and Lü joined their forces, and they were soon joined by several other officers, including Zhang Shenjian. While he could not capture Yang Prefecture quickly, Yang defeated every attack that Qin and Bi made against him, and Qin and Bi began to believe that Gao was using magic against their forces. A female sorcerer, Wang Fengxian (王奉仙), informed Qin that a famous person would need to die to end Yang Prefecture's misfortunes, and Qin therefore resolved to put Gao to death. On 24 September, he sent his officer Liu Kuangshi (劉匡時) to execute Gao, Gao's sons, brothers, nephews, and their families. The bodies were thrown into a single pit.

After Yang Xingmi captured Yang Prefecture later in the year and forced Qin Yan and Bi to flee, Yang bestowed on Gao's grandnephew Gao Yu (高愈) the honorary title of deputy military governor and had him be in charge of reburying Gao Pian and his family. Before Gao Pian could be reburied, however, Gao Yu himself died, and later, Gao Pian's old subordinate Guang Shiqian (鄺師虔) reburied Gao Pian.
