= Liang Zhen =

Founding Prince of the Chinese Five Dynasties and Strategist

Liang Zhen (Chinese: 梁震), né Liang Ai (梁靄), known as the Hermit of Jing Tower (荊臺隱士) after retirement, was the chief strategist for Gao Jixing (Gao Jichang), the founding prince of the Chinese Five Dynasties and Ten Kingdoms period state of Jingnan (Nanping).

== Background ==
It is not known when Liang Ai was born, but it is known that he was from Yizheng (依政, in modern Chengdu, Sichuan). During the time when Emperor Xizong of Tang was at Chengdu, fleeing from the agrarian rebellion led by Huang Chao, Liang had the chance to meet the imperial official Liu Xiang (劉象) and present his poetry to Liu. Liu complimented him on his poetry, but urged him to change his name as portending poor fortune in politics — pointing out that Ai (靄) was made up of the character parts "rain" (雨) and "meet" (謁), which suggested that he would be meeting people in the rain — in other words, not being very successful, politically. Liu suggested that Liang change his name to Zhen (震), made up of "rain" and "dragon" (辰), as dragons thrived in the rain. Liang agreed. Shortly after, Liang passed the imperial examinations in the Jinshi class, but apparently did not succeed in an official career, as he was said to be living in the imperial capital Chang'an (apparently after Tang imperial forces recaptured it) and not holding offices.

== Service under Gao Jixing ==
=== During Later Liang ===
In or around 908, by which time Tang had been destroyed and its central region been taken over by the succeeding Later Liang, Liang Zhen was trying to return to his homeland (which was then ruled by Later Liang's rival Former Shu). When he went through the city of Jiangling, the Later Liang military governor (Jiedushi) of Jingnan Circuit (荊南, headquartered at Jiangling), Gao Jichang, was impressed by his talent. Gao kept Liang at Jiangling and wanted to make Liang his secretary. Liang found this humiliating (as Gao, while a prominent general at the time, was of a low social station by birth and had served as a servant before) but did not dare to leave against Gao's wishes, fearful that Gao might get angry and kill him. He thus stated to Gao:

I, Liang Zhen, had long not wanted glory and titles. If you, Lord, do not consider me foolish and want me to participate in policy decisions, I can serve you wearing the white clothes of a civilian, and I do not need to serve on your staff.

Gao agreed. Therefore, for the rest of Liang's life, he referred to himself as "former Jinshi" and did not accept titles offered him by Gao. Gao valued him greatly and made him chief strategist, referring to him as "senior sir."

=== During Later Tang ===
In 923, Later Liang was conquered by its northern rival Later Tang. When Gao Jichang heard this, he was fearful, and he sent articles of submission to Later Tang's emperor Emperor Zhuangzong; he also changed his name to Gao Jixing (to observe naming taboo for Emperor Zhuangzong's grandfather Li Guochang). He further prepared to go to pay homage to Emperor Zhuangzong at the former Later Liang capital Daliang (where Emperor Zhuangzong was at that time). Liang advised against it, stating:

Tang has the ambitions of swallowing up all that is under heaven. Even if you prepare your troops and defend the passes, you still have to fear that you will not be protect yourself, and instead you go thousands of li to greet him! Further, you, Lord, are an old general of the Zhus [(i.e., the imperial family of the destroyed Later Liang)]. How do you know that he will not treat you as an enemy?

Gao did not listen, and he went to greet Emperor Zhuangzong. Emperor Zhuangzong treated him with great honor, but for months kept him at the imperial court and did not return him to Jingnan, and had him follow the emperor to the new Later Tang capital Luoyang. Emperor Zhuangzong further considered keeping him at Luoyang permanently. Emperor Zhuangzong's chief of staff, Guo Chongtao, however, argued that keeping Gao at the imperial court would discourage other former Later Liang subjects from fully devoting themselves to Later Tang, so Emperor Zhuangzong allowed Gao to leave to return to Jingnan around the new year 924. When Gao reached Jiangling, he held Liang's hands and stated, "I did not follow your words, sir, and I almost got stuck in the tiger's mouth."

Meanwhile, while Gao was at Emperor Zhuangzong's court, Emperor Zhuangzong had asked for Gao's advice on which of the two main rival states — Former Shu and Wu — he should target next. Gao, believing that Former Shu, well-protected by natural defenses, would be difficult to conquer, and not wanting Emperor Zhuangzong's empire to keep expanding, told Emperor Zhuangzong that he should attack Former Shu first. When the Later Tang army commanded by Guo and Emperor Zhuangzong's son Li Jiji the Prince of Wei conquered Former Shu in 925, Gao was shocked to hear the news while he was dining, such that he dropped his chopsticks on the ground. He stated, "This is this old man's fault!" Liang responded, "You need not worry. The Lord of Tang, after he conquered Shu lands, will be even more arrogant. He will surely be destroyed soon, and is this not going to be a blessing to us?" Subsequently, Emperor Zhuangzong's wife Empress Liu, believing that Guo had stripped the Shu territory of its wealth, ordered Guo killed, leading to the collapse of the Later Tang army morale and Emperor Zhuangzong's death in a mutiny. It was said that when this news arrived at Jiangling, Gao was impressed with and became even more respectful of Liang. It was also around this time that Liang recommended Sun Guangxian to Gao — and Sun would eventually serve as chief strategist to the rulers of Jingnan who would succeed Gao (Gao's son Gao Conghui, grandsons Gao Baorong and Gao Baoxu, and great-grandson Gao Jichong).

== Service under Gao Conghui ==
Around the new year 929, Gao Jixing, whose Jingnan Circuit was by that point a de facto independent state, died, and was succeeded by his son Gao Conghui. Gao Conghui continued to honor Liang Zhen, referring to Liang as an older brother, and Liang referred to him as master. By 935, though, Liang wanted to retire, and he stated,

The late prince treated me like a friend, and he entrusted the new prince to me. Now the new prince is capable to be on his own and will not destroy his heritage. I am old, and I do not want to serve anyone further.

Liang therefore firmly requested retirement. Gao Conghui could not keep him further, so he built a mansion for Liang on an island. Liang took up the habit of wearing coats made of crane feathers and referred to himself as the "Hermit of the Jing Tower." He still occasionally visited Gao Conghui at Gao's headquarters, and he would ride a yellow cow to get there. Gao also often visited his mansion and gave him many gifts. After Liang's retirement, Gao entrusted the matters of state to Sun Guangxian instead. It was said that Liang lived out his years in comfort, but it was not recorded when he died.

== Notes and references ==
- Spring and Autumn Annals of the Ten Kingdoms (十國春秋), vol. 102.
- Zizhi Tongjian, vols. 267, 272, 274, 275, 279.
