= Lei Yangong =

Lei Yangong (Chinese: 雷彥恭) was a Chinese warlord who controlled Wuzhen Circuit (武貞, headquartered in modern-day Changde, Hunan) as its military governor (Jiedushi) from about 903 to 908, late in the Tang dynasty and early in the subsequent Five Dynasties and Ten Kingdoms period. He later submitted to the state of Yang Wu.

== Background ==
It is not known when Lei Yangong was born. His father Lei Man had taken over the area of Lang Prefecture (朗州, in modern Changde, Hunan) and later became the military governor (Jiedushi) of Wuzhen Circuit, headquartered at Lang Prefecture. When Lei Man died in 901, Lei Yangong's older brother Lei Yanwei claimed the title of acting military governor, Lei Yanwei was full military governor as of 903, when he sacked Jiangling Municipality, the capital of neighboring Jingnan Circuit (荊南), in the absence of Jingnan's military governor Cheng Rui. Lei Yanwei apparently occupied Jiangling for some time, but Lei Yangong rose against him and, in coordination with Zhao Kuangning the military governor of Zhongyi Circuit (忠義, headquartered in modern Xiangyang, Hubei), expelled him from Jiangling and, apparently, from Wuzhen Circuit as well.

== Rule of Wuzhen ==
After overthrowing Lei Yanwei, Lei Yangong apparently occupied Jiangling for a short while, until Zhao Kuangning sent his brother Zhao Kuangming to expel Lei Yangong from Jiangling.

As of 906, by which time Lei Yangong was referred to as the military governor of Wuzhen, he was repeatedly pillaging Jingnan, which was then under the control of He Gui, a subordinate of the powerful warlord Zhu Quanzhong the military governor of Xuanwu Circuit (宣武, headquartered in modern Kaifeng, Henan). In 906, because He Gui was unable to stem the repeated pillages that Lei was carrying out, Zhu replaced him with Gao Jichang, who proceeded to build up Jiangling's defenses against future raids.

In 907 — by which time Zhu had taken over the Tang imperial throne and established a new Later Liang as its Emperor Taizu — Lei allied with Ma Yin the Prince of Chu to again attack Jiangling. (The attack was despite Chu's status as a Later Liang vassal, while Lei had submitted to Later Liang's rival Hongnong.) Gao stationed an army at Gong'an (公安, in modern Jingzhou) to cut off the Wuzhen forces' supply route, and then defeated them. Both Wuzhen and Chu forces withdrew. Apparently turning against his ally, Lei then attacked Chu's Yue Prefecture (岳州, in modern Yueyang, Hunan), but was unable to capture it.

Lei subsequently continued his pillage campaign against Jingnan. Emperor Taizu thereafter declared a general campaign against him and ordered Gao and Ma to attack him. Gao sent his general Ni Kefu (倪可福) to rendezvous with the Chu general Qin Yanhui (秦彥暉), and they put Lang Prefecture under siege. Lei sought aid from Hongnong's prince Yang Wo. Yang Wo sent the generals Ling Ye (泠業) and Li Rao (李饒) to try to save Lei, but they were defeated and captured by the Chu general Xu Dexun and never reached Lang Prefecture.

However, with waters that Lei Man had previously diverted to surround and protect Lang Prefecture serving as a defensive bulwark, Lang's defenses were initially holding. After Qin held off attacking for some time, Lei became less vigilant about defending the city. Qin then sent the officer Cao Dechang (曹德昌) with a group of soldiers to secretly cross the waters at night and get into the city, and then suddenly rise and set fires in the city. The city fell into panic, allowing Qin to march in with his soldiers. Lei Yangong took a small boat and fled to Hongnong's capital Guangling (廣陵, in modern Yangzhou, Jiangsu), where Yang Wo's brother and successor Yang Longyan made him the deputy military governor of Huainan Circuit (淮南, headquartered at Guangling). Qin captured Lei Yangong's younger brother Lei Yanxiong (雷彥雄) and delivered him to the Later Liang capital Daliang, where he, along with six other adherents of Lei Yangong's, were executed. It is not known when Lei Yangong himself died.

== Notes and references ==
- New Book of Tang, vol. 186.
- History of the Five Dynasties, vol. 17.
- New History of the Five Dynasties, vol. 41.
- Zizhi Tongjian, vols. 265, 266.
