= Gao Jixing =

Ruler of Jingnan (Nanping) from 924 to 929

Prince Wuxin of Nanping 南平武信王

Ruler of Jingnan (Nanping)
- Reign: April 14, 924 – January 28, 929
- Successor: Gao Conghui, Prince Wenxian of Nanping

Jiedushi of Jingnan Circuit (荊南節度使)
- Tenure: 906 – 929
- Predecessor: He Gui
- Successor: Gao Conghui
- Born: 858
- Died: January 28, 929
Full name
- Family name: Gāo (高), briefly Zhū (朱); Given name: Initially Jìchāng (季昌), later Jìxīng (季興) (changed 923)
Era dates
- Adopted the era names of Later Tang: Tongguang (同光): 924–926; Tiancheng (天成): 926–928; Adopted the era name of Yang Wu: Qianzhen (乾貞): 928–929
Regnal name
- 913–924: Prince of Bohai (渤海王); 924–926: Prince of Nanping (南平王); 926–929: Prince of Qin (秦王); 929 (posthumously): Prince of Chu (楚王)
Posthumous name
- Prince Wǔxìn (武信王, "martial and trustworthy")
- House: Gao
- Dynasty: Jingnan

Gao Jixing (Chinese: 高季興) (858 – January 28, 929), born Gao Jichang (高季昌), known for some time as Zhu Jichang (朱季昌), courtesy name Yisun (貽孫), also known by his posthumous name as the Prince Wuxin of Chu (楚武信王), was the founding prince of Jingnan during the Five Dynasties and Ten Kingdoms period of China.

== During Tang Dynasty ==
=== Background ===
Gao Jichang was born in 858, during the reign of Emperor Xuānzong. He was from Shanshi (陝石, in modern Sanmenxia, Henan), and, in his youth, became a servant of a rich man at Bian Prefecture (汴州, in modern Kaifeng, Henan) — although the identity of his master received divergent reports in traditional sources. According to the History of the Five Dynasties, which the Zizhi Tongjian also adopted, he became a servant of Li Qilang (李七郎), who later became an adoptive son of Zhu Quanzhong the military governor (Jiedushi) of Xuanwu Circuit (宣武, headquartered at Bian Prefecture) and had his name changed to Zhu Yougong (朱友恭). According to the New History of the Five Dynasties, which the Spring and Autumn Annals of the Ten Kingdoms (十國春秋) also adopted, he became a servant of Li Rang (李讓), who later loaned money to Zhu and became an adoptive son of Zhu's, with his name changed to Zhu Yourang (朱友讓); the Spring and Autumn Annals of the Ten Kingdoms further indicated that also serving as Zhu Yourang's servants then were later prominent military/political figures Dong Zhang and Kong Xun. Under both accounts, when Gao managed to meet Zhu, Zhu was impressed by his talent, and had his master adopt him as a son — thus making him Zhu's adoptive grandson and having him take on the surname of Zhu.

=== Service under Zhu Quanzhong ===
In 902, Zhu Jichang was serving as an officer under Zhu Quanzhong, who was then sieging his rival Li Maozhen the military governor of Fengxiang Circuit (鳳翔, headquartered in modern Baoji, Shaanxi), at Fengxiang's capital Fengxiang Municipality. (Zhu Quanzhong had initiated the siege after the powerful eunuchs, led by Han Quanhui, an ally of Li Maozhen's, forcibly seized then-reigning Emperor Zhaozong and took him from the imperial capital Chang'an to Fengxiang after they became apprehensive that Emperor Zhaozong and the chancellor Cui Yin were about to slaughter the eunuchs. Cui, an ally of Zhu Quanzhong's, then summoned Zhu Quanzhong to attack Fengxiang.) As of fall 902, Zhu Quanzhong had had Fengxiang under siege for about a year, but was unable to capture it, with his siege efforts hampered by rain and his soldiers becoming ill. He thus considered withdrawing to Huguo Circuit (護國, headquartered in modern Yuncheng, Shanxi), which he also possessed. Zhu Jichang and fellow officer Liu Zhijun, however, opposed, pointing out that Li Maozhen was in desperate straits. Zhu Quanzhong, however, was concerned about Li Maozhen's strategy of refusing to engage the Xuanwu troops and putting up a strong defense at Fengxiang. At Zhu Jichang's suggestion, Zhu Quanzhong decided to try trickery — and asked for a volunteer soldier to try to trick Li Maozhen into engaging the Xuanwu army. One Ma Jing (馬景) volunteered, and pretended to surrender to the Fengxiang army. Ma then informed Li Maozhen that Zhu Quanzhong had already left, leaving only about 10,000 ill soldiers to pretend to be still putting up a siege, and that even they would depart that night. He suggested that Li Maozhen attack the Xuanwu camp. Li Maozhen agreed and attacked — and his army immediately fell into a trap set by the Xuanwu army, suffering large losses. From this point on, Li Maozhen, while not surrendering immediately, began to negotiate with Zhu Quanzhong for peace, promising to give the emperor to him (which occurred eventually in spring 903). For Zhu Jichang's contributions to this victory, Zhu Quanzhong made him the military prefect (團練使, Tuanlianshi) of Song Prefecture (宋州, in modern Shangqiu, Henan). Zhu Jichang subsequently participated in the Xuanwu army's campaign against Wang Shifan the military governor of Pinglu Circuit (平盧, headquartered in modern Weifang, Shandong) and was made the defender (防禦使, Fangyushi) of Ying Prefecture (潁州, in modern Fuyang, Anhui). His surname was changed back to Gao.

In 905, Zhu Quanzhong had conquered Zhongyi (忠義, headquartered in modern Xiangyang, Hubei) and Jingnan (荊南, headquartered in modern Jingzhou, Hubei) Circuits, then ruled by brothers Zhao Kuangning and Zhao Kuangming, respectively. Zhu initially made his officer He Gui the acting military governor of Jingnan. However, later in the year, when Lei Yangong the military governor of Wuzhen Circuit (武貞, headquartered in modern Changde, Hunan) repeatedly made incursions into Jingnan territory and He Gui reacted by merely defending Jingnan's capital Jiangling Municipality without engaging Lei, Zhu believed He to be fearful. He sent Gao to replace He Gui, while sending the officer Ni Kefu (倪可福) to Jingnan as well to help defend against Lei. Lei then withdrew.

== During Later Liang ==
=== During Emperor Taizu's reign ===
In 907, Zhu Quanzhong had Emperor Zhaozong's son and successor Emperor Ai yield the throne to him, ending Tang and starting a new Later Liang as its Emperor Taizu. He commissioned Gao Jichang as the full military governor of Jingnan. By this point, Jingnan, which formerly consisted of eight prefectures (counting Jiangling Municipality as a prefecture), had suffered much through warfare, and most of its prefectures had been taken by warlords ruling other circuits. Even Jiangling itself had its walls and buildings in disrepair, and its population greatly reduced. When Gao arrived at Jiangling, he comforted the people and encouraged them to return, and it was said that the people's lives began to return to normal.

In fall 907, Lei Yangong, with aid from Ma Yin the Prince of Chu (even though that Ma was formally a Later Liang vassal), attacked Jiangling. Gao stationed troops at Gong'an (公安, in modern Jingzhou) to cut off Lei's food supply route, and then defeated him. He withdrew, as did Chu troops. Later, Lei attacked Cenyang (涔陽, also in modern Jingzhou) and Gong'an, but could not capture them.

After these attacks by Lei, Emperor Taizu resolved to destroy him, as he was then often pillaging the nearby circuits, and also was a vassal to one of Later Liang's rival states, Hongnong. Emperor Taizu therefore ordered that his titles be stripped, and ordered Gao and Ma to attack him. In winter 907, Gao sent Ni Kefu to rendezvous with the Chu general Qin Yanhui (秦彥暉) to attack Wuzhen's capital Lang Prefecture (朗州). Lei sought aid from Hongnong, and Yang Wo the Prince of Hongnong sent his generals Ling Ye (泠業) and Li Rao (李饒) to try to aid him. Ling and Li, however, were intercepted by the Chu general Xu Dexun, who captured them; Ma subsequently executed them. Subsequently, Yang, apparently again trying to save Lei, sent troops to attack Later Liang's Zhongyi and Jingnan Circuits, but both attacks were repelled, with Gao defeating the Hongnong general Li Hou (李厚). By summer 908, Lang Prefecture fell to Qin, and Lei fled to Hongnong. Wuzhen was absorbed into Chu territory. Apparently in response, Gao stationed troops at Hankou to cut off the tributary route between Chu and Later Liang's capital Luoyang. Ma subsequently sent Xu to attack the Jingnan troops stationed there, but before Xu could arrive, Gao sued for peace. Later that year, Emperor Taizu bestowed the honorary chancellor designation of Tong Zhongshu Menxia Pingzhangshi on Gao.

Also in 908, one Liang Zhen, who had passed the imperial examinations in the Jinshi (進士) class in the late Tang years, was returning from Luoyang to his home region, then ruled by Former Shu. When he went through Jiangling, Gao met him and was impressed by him, and so wanted to keep him at Jingnan to be secretary. Because of Gao's low birth, Liang considered it a humiliation to serve on Gao's staff, but did not dare to leave without Gao's permission, as he feared that Gao would kill him if he did. He therefore stated to Gao:

I, Liang Zhen, had never wanted glory and honor. If you, Lord, do not consider me foolish and want me to participate in providing suggestions, I can serve you while wearing white [(i.e., in civilian clothes)]. I need not serve you on your staff.

Gao agreed. For the rest of Liang's life, he referred himself as "former Jinshi" and did not accept title positions offered to him by Gao (and later, by Gao's son Gao Conghui). Gao valued Liang's advice greatly and effectively made Liang his chief strategist.

In 909, the soldiers at Zhongyi mutinied and killed the acting military governor Wang Ban (王班), supporting one of their own, Li Hong (李洪), to be acting military governor. Li Hong submitted to and sought aid from Former Shu. He also subsequently attacked Jingnan, but Gao sent Ni to repel him. Emperor Taizu subsequently sent the officer Chen Hui (陳暉) to rendezvous with Jingnan troops to attack Li Hong. They soon captured Zhongyi's capital Xiang Prefecture (襄州), taking Li Hong captive and sending him to Luoyang to be executed.

In 910, Ma sent an army to attack Jingnan, but Gao defeated it and repelled it.

By 912, it was said that Gao was beginning to contemplate making Jingnan his own personal possession, and therefore, after receiving approval to do so, added a second layer to Jiangling's city walls to add to its defensive capabilities.

=== After Emperor Taizu's reign ===
In summer 912, Emperor Taizu was assassinated by his son Zhu Yougui the Prince of Ying, who, after blaming the assassination on his adoptive brother Zhu Youwen the Prince of Kang and killing Zhu Youwen, took the throne.

In late 912, Chen Zhang (陳璋), a general of Wu — i.e., formerly Hongnong but now known as Wu — attacked Chu's Yue Prefecture (岳州, in modern Yueyang, Hunan) and captured it. Chen then attacked Jingnan, but could not capture it and so withdrew. Jingnan and Chu troops then converged at the mouth of where Han River flowed into the Yangtze River, trying to intercept him, but he went past them during the night and escaped their attempt to stop him.

Around the same time, Gao Jixing, announcing that he was joining the campaign of Later Liang forces then fighting against Later Liang's archenemy Jin to the north, took his army and advanced north, but instead was attacking Xiang Prefecture (襄州), the capital of Zhongyi — which by this time had reverted to its older name of Shannan East Circuit. Kong Qing (孔勍) the military governor of Shannan East repelled him. It was said that after this battle, Gao stopped submitting tributes to the Later Liang imperial government.

In 913, Zhu Yougui's younger brother Zhu Youzhen the Prince of Jun overthrew Zhu Yougui and took the throne himself (and then changed his name to Zhu Zhen). He tried to placate Gao by creating Gao the Prince of Bohai. However, Gao still began to build a fleet that eventually grew to 500 ships, and further enhanced his defenses and the soldiers' armors and weapons. Further, he began to enter into diplomatic communications with Former Shu and Wu, with the Later Liang imperial government unable to stop him.

In 914, Gao launched his fleet and headed west on the Yangtze, trying to capture four prefectures that were previously part of Jingnan but which had become Former Shu territory — Kui (夔州), Wan (萬州), Zhong (忠州), and Fu (涪州, all in modern Chongqing). However, when he attacked Kui first, he was defeated by the Former Shu prefect of Kui, Wang Chengxian (王成先), and withdrew with heavy losses. In light of Gao's attack, there was suggestions made to the Former Shu emperor Wang Jian that Former Shu destroy a dam on the Three Gorges to let the water destroy Jiangling, but Wang, listening to the advice of his official Mao Wenxi that doing so would kill innocent civilians, did not do so.

In 917, Gao and Kong repaired their relationship, and he resumed submitting tributes to the Later Liang imperial government.

In 919, a Chu army attacked Jingnan. Gao sought aid from Wu. Wu sent the general Liu Xin (劉信) to head toward the Chu capital Tan Prefecture (in modern Changsha, Hunan) while the general Li Jian (李簡) attacked Fu Prefecture (復州, in modern Tianmen, Hubei). With Liu heading toward Tan Prefecture, the Chu army attacking Jingnan withdrew, but Li Jian still was able to capture Fu Prefecture.

In 921, Gao ordered Ni, whose son Ni Zhijin (倪知進) had married a daughter of Gao's by this point, to oversee a project to repair Jiangling's outer walls. When Gao himself went to review the project, he blamed Ni Kefu for the project's slow pace and publicly caned him. However, he stated to his daughter, "Go back to your home and tell your father-in-law: all I wanted to do was to display my authority in front of the people." He also secretly gave her a large amount of platinum for her to give to Ni Kefu.

== During Later Tang ==
=== During Emperor Zhuangzong's reign ===
In 923, Li Cunxu the Prince of Jin declared himself emperor of a new Later Tang (as Emperor Zhuangzong). Shortly after, he made a surprise attack on the Later Liang capital Daliang, catching the city defenseless. Zhu Zhen committed suicide, ending Later Liang. The Later Liang-commissioned military governors, including Gao Jichang subsequently all submitted petitions to him pledging loyalty. Gao further changed his name to Gao Jixing to observe naming taboo (as Emperor Zhuangzong's grandfather was Li Guochang). To show his faithfulness to the new Later Tang emperor, he further wanted to go to Daliang to pay homage to the new emperor. Liang Zhen tried to stop him, stating:

Tang is showing its ambition to swallow up all territory under heaven. Even if you set up strong defenses, you should still be fearful of being unable to stop it. Instead, you are throwing yourself at it, going thousands of li to pay homage! Further, you, Lord, are an old officer of the Zhus. How do you know that you would not be treated as an enemy?

When Gao arrived at Daliang, Emperor Zhuangzong bestowed the greater honorary chancellor title of acting Zhongshu Ling (中書令) on him. On one occasion, the emperor asked him, "We would like to attack Wu and Shu. Which one should be first?" Gao, not actually wanting Emperor Zhuangzong to succeed and believing that Former Shu would be more difficult to conquer due to the geographical barriers, responded, "Wu has infertile lands and poor people; conquering it would do no good. Shu should be attacked first. Its lands are rich; its ruler (Note: Wang Jian's son and successor Wang Zongyan) is frivolous; and its people are discontented. You will surely be able to conquer it if you attack it. After conquering it, go down the river [(i.e., the Yangtze)], and it would be easy to conquer Wu." Emperor Zhuangzong was pleased with his suggestion.

Shortly after, Emperor Zhuangzong set his capital at Luoyang, and Gao followed him there. Gao soon became disenchanted that Emperor Zhuangzong's favorite performers and eunuchs were demanding gifts from him, and wanted to return to Jingnan. Emperor Zhuangzong, however, was considering detaining Gao at Luoyang. The emperor's chief of staff Guo Chongtao urged against it, pointing out that the other military governors, at most, had only sent sons, brothers, or staff members to pay homage, and that only Gao had come himself; Guo believed that detaining Gao would send the wrong message. Emperor Zhuangzong therefore allowed him to leave. When Gao reached Xu Prefecture (許州, in modern Xuchang, Henan), he commented, "This trip contained two mistake: The first mistake was that I came; the second mistake was that he let me leave." When he went through Xiang Prefecture, Kong Qing held a feast for him, but at night, Gao cut open the lock on the city gate and escaped. When he reached Jiangling, he held Liang Zhen's hands and said, "I did not accept your suggestion, and I was almost caught in a tiger's mouth." He further spoke with his staff members and criticized Emperor Zhuangzong:

The new dynasty fought 100 battles to win the territory south of the Yellow River, but he raised his hands to his contributors and stated, "I gained the empire through my 10 fingers." When he is this arrogant, he is denying the contributions of all others. The morale will fail. Further, he is frivolously spending time on hunting and women. He will not last long, and we should not worry.

Gao then further built up the city's defenses and food storage, and he welcomed old Later Liang soldiers into his army, preparing for an eventual defensive war.

In 924, Emperor Zhuangzong bestowed the even greater honorary chancellor title of Shangshu Ling (尚書令) on Gao and created him the Prince of Nanping.

In fall 925, Emperor Zhuangzong launched a major attack on Former Shu, intending to destroy it. He made his son Li Jiji the Prince of Wei the titular commander of the operations, with Guo as Li Jiji's deputy and the one in actual charge of the military operations. As part of the division of responsibilities among Later Tang vassals, Emperor Zhuangzong gave Gao the title of commander of southeastern operations and ordered him to attack and take Kui, Zhong, and Wan Prefectures to add to his own territory. Gao left his son Gao Conghui in charge of Jiangling and headed west on the Yangtze. He thereafter was hampered by a large iron chain that the Former Shu general Zhang Wu (張武) set up to defend the Three Gorges. He tried to send soldiers to destroy the chain, but Zhang attacked and defeated him, forcing him to retreat back to Jiangling. However, soon thereafter, Zhang heard news that Li Jiji and Guo had crushed the main Former Shu resistance force, and so send messengers to submit to Li Jiji. When, soon thereafter, Gao heard news that Wang Yan surrendered to Li Jiji, he, who was eating at that time, dropped his chopsticks, stating, "This is the fault of this old man." Liang Zhen instead stated, "You need not worry. The ruler of Tang, after receiving Shu lands, would surely become even more arrogant and soon be destroyed. How do you know that this would not be to our benefit?"

Subsequently, after Emperor Zhuangzong, believing in false rumors of their planning to rebel against him, had Guo and another major general, Zhu Youqian, killed, many rebellions started against him. By summer 926, even the army at Luoyang mutinied, and he was killed in the mutiny. When Gao received this news, he became even more respectful of Liang.

=== During Emperor Mingzong's reign ===
In the aftermaths of Emperor Zhuangzong's death, Emperor Zhuangzong's adoptive brother Li Siyuan claimed imperial title (as Emperor Mingzong). Meanwhile, Gao Jixing prepared his fleet and wanted to attack Chu. His official Sun Guangxian, whom Liang Zhen had recommended to him to be his scribe, pointed out that Jingnan had barely recovered from the wars, and if it were engaged in a war with Chu, other states might take advantage and attack Jingnan. Gao agreed and stopped his plans to attack Chu. Meanwhile, he requested that Jingnan be given control of Kui, Zhong, and Wan Prefectures; Emperor Mingzong agreed.

However, soon thereafter Gao began a series of actions that provoked Emperor Mingzong's administration. He had requested, after Emperor Mingzong gave him Kui, Zhong, and Wan Prefectures, that the imperial government not commission prefects for those prefectures, but allow him to commission his own family members; Emperor Mingzong refused. Soon thereafter, when Pan Kang (a former Former Shu official) left his post as prefect of Kui, Gao sent an army to Kui, killed the soldiers already stationed there, and took direct control, and when Emperor Mingzong subsequently commissioned the officer Xifang Ye (西方鄴) to be the prefect, Gao refused to allow Xifang to take office. He also launched a surprise attack on Fu Prefecture, but was unable to capture it. Further, when Han Gong (韓珙), an officer that Li Jiji (who committed suicide after his own soldiers refused to follow his orders after Emperor Zhuangzong's death) had sent to escort Former Shu treasures down the Yangtze to Luoyang, went through the Three Gorges, Gao sent an army to surprise and kill Han, and he took over the treasures. When Emperor Mingzong sent an emissary to question Gao about what happened to Han, Gao responded: "Han Gong and the others took ships down the Gorges and had to go thousands of li. If you want to know why their ships overturned and they drowned, you should question the river god." In anger, Emperor Mingzong stripped Gao of his titles and commissioned Liu Xun (劉訓) the military governor of Shannan East to attack Gao from the north, with Xia Luqi (夏魯奇) the military governor of Zhongwu Circuit (忠武, headquartered in modern Xuchang) as Liu's deputy; Dong Zhang the military governor of Dongchuan Circuit (東川, headquartered in modern Mianyang, Sichuan) to attack him from the west, with Xifang as Dong's deputy; and Ma Yin to attack from the south.

Liu quickly put Jiangling under siege, but as Jiangling was humid, and it happened to be rainy season, the siege was hampered, with many of Liu's soldiers and Liu himself becoming ill. Emperor Mingzong sent Kong Xun, who had become his chief of staff, to Jiangling to oversee the siege. Kong, who was also unable to capture Jiangling, sent emissaries into the city to try to persuade Gao to submit. Gao not only refused to do so, but was rude to Kong's emissaries. Meanwhile, despite Emperor Mingzong's sending much gifts to Ma, Ma found excuses not to attack Jiangling. With the siege unsuccessful, Emperor Mingzong ordered Liu to withdraw. However, Xifang was able to defeat Jingnan forces stationed at Kui, Zhong, and Wan, and recapture those three prefectures for the Later Tang imperial government. Emperor Mingzong created a Ningjiang Circuit (寧江), with its headquarters at Kui, and made Xifang its military governor. Despite Xifang's victory, Emperor Mingzong blamed the approval of Gao's petition to take the three prefectures on the former chancellors Doulu Ge and Wei Yue, and ordered them to commit suicide. Around the same time, Gao intercepted and captured Ma's tributary emissary to Emperor Mingzong, Shi Guangxian (史光憲), as well as the awards that Emperor Mingzong was sending Ma via Shi. He thereafter submitted a petition requesting to be a Wu vassal. However, the Wu regent Xu Wen believed that it would be ill-advised for Wu to accept Gao as a vassal, pointing out that Jiangling was much closer to the Later Tang capital Luoyang than to Wu's capital Guangling (廣陵, in modern Yangzhou, Jiangsu) and therefore it would be difficult Wu to aid Jingnan if Later Tang attacked again; he therefore accepted Gao's tributes but refused to accept him as a vassal.

In spring 928, Xifang captured Jingnan's Gui Prefecture (歸州, in modern Yichang, Hubei), but soon Jingnan forces recaptured it.

Also in spring 928, Ma sent Yuan Quan (袁詮), Wang Huan (王環), and his son Ma Xizhan (馬希瞻) to attack Jingnan. Gao himself engaged the Chu forces, but Ma Xizhan was able to lay a trap for him at Liulang Ford (劉郎袱, in modern Jingzhou) and defeat him. The Chu forces then approached Jiangling. In fear, Gao sued for peace and returned Shi to Chu. (When Ma Yin subsequently questioned Wang why the Chu army did not go ahead and try to capture Jiangling, Wang pointed out that Jingnan served as a buffer zone between Chu and Later Tang, Wu, and the Shu region. Ma understood Wang's point and did not question him further.)

In summer 928, the Wu generals Miao Lin (苗璘) and Wang Yanzhang (王彥章) were attacking Chu's Yue Prefecture, and they were set to rendezvous with Jingnan forces. Xu Dexun defeated and captured them, however, and it is not clear whether Jingnan forces actually participated in the battle.

Soon thereafter, Gao again requested to be a Wu vassal. With Xu Wen's having died and his adoptive son Xu Zhigao now regent, Wu agreed to accept Gao as a vassal and created him the Prince of Qin. Emperor Mingzong thereafter ordered Ma Yin to attack Gao. Ma sent Xu and his son Ma Xifan to advance to Shatou (沙頭, in modern Jingzhou). When the armies engaged, Gao's nephew Gao Congsi (高從嗣) challenged Ma Xifan to a one-on-one combat, but the Chu officer Liao Kuangqi (廖匡齊) instead took the challenge and killed Gao Congsi in the one-on-one combat. Gao Jixing then sued for peace, and Ma Yin agreed, recalling Xu and Ma Xifan.

In fall 928, Emperor Mingzong commissioned the general Fang Zhiwen (房知溫) to attack Jingnan, and he summoned the troops from many circuits to converge at Xiang Prefecture to prepare to attack Jiangling. However, before the Later Tang forces could converge and attack, Gao himself died around the new year 929. The Wu emperor Yang Pu commissioned Gao Conghui as the new military governor of Jingnan. Subsequently, Gao Conghui, who had not been supportive of Gao Jixing's resistance against Later Tang, submitted a petition to Later Tang's Emperor Mingzong, asking to again be a vassal of Later Tang. In spring 929, Emperor Mingzong agreed and ended the campaign against Jingnan. Emperor Mingzong subsequently posthumously created Gao Jixing the Prince of Chu.

== Personal information ==
- Wife?/Concubine?
  - Lady Zhang, mother of Gao Conghui
- Children
  - Gao Conghui (高從誨), later Prince Wenxian
  - Gao Congxu (高從诩)
  - Gao Congshen (高從詵)
  - Gao Congrang (高從讓)
  - Gao Congqian (高從謙)
  - Four other sons
  - Daughter, wife of Ni Zhijin (倪知進), son of the general Ni Kefu (倪可福)
  - Five other daughters

== Notes and references ==
- Mote, F.W. (1999). Imperial China (900-1800). Harvard University Press. pp. 11, 16. ISBN 0-674-01212-7.
- History of the Five Dynasties, vol. 133.
- New History of the Five Dynasties, vol. 69.
- Spring and Autumn Annals of the Ten Kingdoms, vol. 100.
- Zizhi Tongjian, vols. 263, 265, 266, 267, 268, 269, 270, 271, 272, 273, 274, 275, 276.

Regnal titles
New creation	Prince of Nanping; 924–928	Succeeded by Gao Conghui (Prince Wenxian)
Preceded by He Gui	Ruler of China (Jingzhou region) (de facto); 906–928	Succeeded by Gao Conghui (Prince Wenxian)
