= He Gui =

Chinese general (858–919)

- Traditional Chinese: 賀瓌
- Simplified Chinese: 贺瓌
Transcriptions
Standard Mandarin
- Hanyu Pinyin: Hè Guī
- Wade–Giles: Ho^{4} Kuei^{1}
Middle Chinese
- Middle Chinese: /ɦɑ^{H} kuʌi/

Courtesy name
- Traditional Chinese: 光遠
- Simplified Chinese: 光远
Transcriptions
Standard Mandarin
- Hanyu Pinyin: Guāngyuǎn
- Wade–Giles: Kuang^{1}yüan^{3}
Middle Chinese
- Middle Chinese: /kwɑŋ ɦʉɐn^{X}/

He Gui (Chinese: 賀瓌; 858 – 28 August 919), courtesy name Guangyuan (光遠), was a major general in the service of the Later Liang state during the Chinese Five Dynasties and Ten Kingdoms period. He served as Later Liang's overall commander of its operations against its archrival Jin from 917 to his death in 919.

== Background ==
He Gui was born in 858, during the reign of Emperor Xuānzong of Tang. It is known that he was from Puyang, but all that is known about his family were the names of several male-line ancestors—great-grandfather He Yan (賀延), grandfather He Hua (賀華), and father He Zhongyuan (賀仲元). It was said that He Gui was ambitious in his youth and became a soldier during the late Tang dynasty disturbance, becoming an officer under Zhu Xuan the prefect of Pu Prefecture (Chinese: 濮州) in modern Heze, Shandong.

== Service under Zhu Xuan ==
In 882, when Han Jian the military governor (jiedushi) of Weibo Circuit (魏博)(headquartered in modern Handan, Hebei) attacked Tianping Circuit (天平) (headquartered in modern Tai'an, Shandong), which Pu Prefecture belonged to, Tianping's military governor Cao Cunshi (曹存實) was killed in battle. Zhu took over the army and subsequently successfully defended Tianping's capital Yun Prefecture (鄆州) against Han's attack. Then-reigning Emperor Xizong (Emperor Xuānzong's grandson) commissioned Zhu as the acting military governor, and later the military governor, of Tianping. Zhu made He Gui the commander of the cavalry and infantry.

By 887, Zhu Xuan was at war with erstwhile ally Zhu Quanzhong the military governor of Xuanwu Circuit (宣武)(headquartered in modern Kaifeng, Henan). He Gui often commanded the Tianping army in battles between Zhu Xuan's and Zhu Quanzhong's armies. In late 895, Zhu Quanzhong's army had Zhu Xuan's cousin Zhu Jin the military governor of Taining Circuit (泰寧)(headquartered in modern Jining, Shandong) under siege at Taining's capital Yan Prefecture (兗州), when Zhu Xuan sent He Gui and another officer, Liu Cun (柳存), as well as He Huaibao (何懷寶), an officer of his ally Li Keyong the military governor of Hedong Circuit (河東, headquartered in modern Taiyuan, Shanxi), to attack Cao Prefecture (曹州, in modern Heze), to try to see if that attack could help lift the siege on Yan. However, they encountered the main army under Zhu Quanzhong's own command and were soundly defeated, with He Gui, Liu, and He Huaibao all captured by the Xuanwu army. Zhu Quanzhong took them to Yan and showed them to Zhu Jin, hoping that their capture would help convince Zhu Jin to surrender, but subsequently Zhu Jin used trick to kill his cousin Zhu Qiong (朱瓊), who had previously surrendered to Zhu Quanzhong, which caused a morale failure in Zhu Quanzhong's army and forced Zhu Quanzhong to withdraw. Zhu Quanzhong executed Liu and He Huaibao, but, having heard of He Gui's abilities, spared He Gui and made He Gui an officer in his own army. It was said that because Zhu Quanzhong spared him, He Gui privately swore an oath to be faithful to Zhu Quanzhong.

== Service under Zhu Quanzhong during the Tang dynasty ==
In 903, when Zhu Quanzhong's ally Wang Shifan the military governor of Pinglu Circuit (平盧, headquartered in modern Weifang, Shandong) turned against Zhu (believing that he was doing so under the order of Emperor Xizong's brother and successor Emperor Zhaozong), He Gui participated in Zhu's campaign against Wang, and after the victory, he was made the prefect of Cao Prefecture. He also followed Zhu in his campaign against Zhao Kuangning the military governor of Zhongyi Circuit (忠義, headquartered in modern Xiangyang, Hubei) and Zhao's brother Zhao Kuangming the military governor of Jingnan Circuit (荊南, headquartered in modern Jingzhou, Hubei) in 905, and after Zhu's conquest of those circuits was made the acting military governor of Jingnan. Subsequently, when Lei Yangong the military governor of Wuzhen Circuit (武貞, headquartered in modern Changde, Hunan) attacked Jingnan's capital Jiangling Municipality, He Gui withdrew within the city to defend it, and Zhu considered this a display of weakness; he therefore recalled He Gui and replaced him with Gao Jichang.

== Service during Later Liang ==
=== During Emperor Taizu's reign ===
In 907, Zhu Quanzhong, who had the imperial court under his control at that point, had Emperor Zhaozong's son and successor Emperor Ai yield the throne to him, ending Tang and starting a new Later Liang as its Emperor Taizu. He Gui continued to serve in Xuanwu army and received continued promotions. In 909, he was made the military prefect (團練使, Tuanlianshi) of Xing Prefecture (邢州, in modern Xingtai, Hebei). In 910, he was made the prefect of Ze Prefecture (澤州, in modern Jincheng, Shanxi) and the acting military governor of Zhaoyi Circuit (昭義)—which Ze Prefecture belonged to but the capital of which, Lu Prefecture (潞州, in modern Changzhi, Shanxi), was then under the control of Later Liang's archrival Jin—and was also created a marquess. In 912, he was made the prefect of Xiang Prefecture (相州, in modern Handan). He was soon recalled to the Later Liang imperial government to serve as the commander of the Left Longhu Army (左龍虎軍).

=== During Zhu Zhen's reign ===
In 916, by which time Emperor Taizu's son Zhu Zhen was emperor, Weibo Circuit, which had long been in Later Liang's hands, rebelled against Later Liang over Zhu Zhen's plan to weaken the circuit by dividing it into two circuits, and surrendered to Jin. Jin's prince Li Cunxu was able to take over the circuit despite Later Liang's attempts to recapture it, although in one of the battles, He Gui and another general, Wang Tan (王檀), were able to recapture one of Weibo's prefectures, Chan Prefecture (澶州, in modern Puyang), and the prefect that Li Cunxu commissioned, the Weibo officer Li Yan (李巖), and deliver Li Yan to Zhu Zhen at the capital Daliang.

Later in 916, Qing Prefecture (慶州, in modern Qingyang, Gansu) turned against Later Liang and surrendered to Qi's general Li Jizhi (李繼陟). Zhu Zhen ordered He Gui to command a Later Liang task force to counterattack, and He Gui's counterattack quickly captured Qi's Ning (寧州) and Yan (衍州) (both in modern Qingyang). After Qing also fell to him in fall 917, Zhu Zhen rewarded him by making him the military governor of Xuanyi Circuit (宣義, headquartered in modern Anyang, Henan) and giving him the honorary chancellor designation of Tong Zhongshu Menxia Pingzhangshi (同中書門下平章事). Shortly after, Zhu Zhen further made him overall commander of the Later Liang forces on the northern border with Jin. (The chancellor Jing Xiang, however, appeared to be dismayed over the choice, as he submitted petition in which he urged Zhu Zhen to pay more personal attention to the campaign against Jin rather than just leaving it to He Gui and other generals.)

Soon, He Gui was in conflict with one of the generals under him, Xie Yanzhang (謝彥章), as He Gui was known for his ability in commanding infantry soldiers and Xie was known for his ability in commanding cavalry soldiers, and He Gui did not like the fact that they had fairly equivalent reputation. In late 918, there was a time when He Gui and Xie were surveilling the potential battlefield, and He Gui pointed out a good spot to pitch camp—which, when the Jin army subsequently arrived, they used to pitch camp. He Gui thus suspected Xie of leaking the information to the Jin army. Meanwhile, He Gui wanted to directly confront the Jin army, while Xie argued for not engaging the Jin army directly but instead trying to take strategically advantageous positions to wait for the Jin army to make a mistake. He Gui thus further suspected Xie. After secretly reporting the suspicious to Zhu Zhen, He Gui and a general under him, Zhu Gui (朱珪), lay a trap for Xie and two other cavalry commanders, Meng Shencheng (孟審澄) and Hou Wenyu (侯溫裕), killing them and claiming that they had committed treason.

Hearing of He Gui's killing of Xie, Li Cunxu was very pleased at what he considered a self-defeating action by He Gui, and decided to try to launch a direct attack on Daliang, despite contrary advice by his major general Zhou Dewei. He thus abandoned the camp that he had pitched near He Gui's army and headed west. In response, He Gui also marched west. The armies met and fought at Huliu Slope (胡柳陂, in modern Heze), and initially, the Jin army was victorious, causing one of the generals under He Gui, Wang Yanzhang, to try to retreat to the west, but the Jin army, mistaking Wang's troops for their own, believed that they had been defeated, and went into a general panic, causing many casualties, including Zhou and his son. In the aftermaths of the initial victory, He Gui try to take advantage by taking a hill position. Li Cunxu, realizing that the hill was tactically important, personally fought and captured it. The Jin generals Li Sizhao and Li Jianji (李建及) subsequently led a charge of the Jin troops from the hill against the Later Liang troops, crushing them, before disengaging. (Overall, the Huliu Slope battle killed two-thirds of both the Later Liang and the Jin army.)

In summer 919, He Gui led another attack against the Jin city of Desheng (德勝, in modern Puyang), which was divided by the Yellow River into the northern city and the southern city. He Gui stationed his Yellow River fleet on the river, chaining the ships together to serve as a blockade to block access between the two halves of the city, and then put the southern city under siege. When Li Cunxu arrived at the northern city, he initially could not cross to try to save the southern city. Li Jianji, however, led a group of soldiers and volunteered to charge the Later Liang fleet. They reached the fleet and cut off the chains by axes and fire, causing the Later Liang fleet to disassemble. This allowed the Jin army to then cross the river and lift the siege on the southern city of Desheng. He Gui was forced to retreat. He died later in the year, without carrying out another attack on Jin. He was given posthumous honors.

== Notes and references ==
- History of the Five Dynasties, vol. 23.
- New History of the Five Dynasties, vol. 23.
- Zizhi Tongjian, vols. 260, 265, 269, 270.
