= Sun Guangxian =

Sun Guangxian (Chinese: 孫光憲; died 968), courtesy name Mengwen (孟文), self-styled Baoguangzi (葆光子), was an official of the Chinese Five Dynasties and Ten Kingdoms period Jingnan state (Nanping). He became the official who was most in charge of policies and governance after the retirement of Liang Zhen during the rule of Jingnan's second ruler Gao Conghui, and subsequently served in that role under Gao Conghui, his sons Gao Baorong and Gao Baoxu, and his grandson Gao Jichong.

== Background ==
It is unclear when Sun Guangxian was born. Both the History of Song and the Spring and Autumn Annals of the Ten Kingdoms indicated that he was from Guiping (貴平, in modern Meishan, Sichuan)—although the Spring and Autumn Annals of the Ten Kingdoms acknowledged that one of Sun's own works, the Beimeng Suoyan (北夢瑣言), stated that he was from Fuchun (富春, in modern Hangzhou, Zhejiang).

Sun's family was said to have been farmers for generations, but he himself was studious from his youth. During the time that Later Tang ruled Ling Prefecture (陵州, in modern Chengdu, Sichuan), Sun served as the assistant to the prefect of Ling and became known for his abilities. Early in the Tiancheng era (926–930) of Later Tang's second emperor Li Siyuan, apparently believing that warfare would overwhelm the region, Sun left the region and took up residence in Jingnan Circuit (荊南, headquartered in modern Jingzhou, Hubei), then ruled by Gao Jixing, who would be the first ruler of the Jingnan state. At that time, he was a Later Tang vassal but intending to effectively rule independently, and so was welcoming capable people to his realm. His chief strategist Liang Zhen recommended Sun to him, and he made Sun his secretary.

== At Jingnan ==
=== During Gao Jixing's rule ===
At that time, Gao Jixing was contemplating attacking another Later Tang vassal, Ma Yin the Prince of Chu. Sun pointed out that the Jingnan realm had long been suffering from warfare and had only gained a measure of respite recently under Gao's rule, and that if he engaged in warfare with Chu, he might draw attack from others who would take advantage. Gao agreed and called off the attack.

=== During Gao Conghui's rule ===
Gao Jixing died in 928 and was succeeded by his son Gao Conghui. Initially, Liang Zhen continued to serve as chief strategist, and Gao Conghui honored him as one would an older brother. In or around 935, there was a time when Gao Conghui, hearing of the prosperity of the Chu realm and the luxury living that Ma Yin's son and successor Ma Xifan was exhibiting, commented to his staff, "Prince Ma is truly a man." Sun responded, "There are differences in rank between the Son of Heaven and his vassals. That young, milk-stenched boy is arrogant and wasteful beyond his proper station. He only seeks to satisfy himself for a brief time and does not care about what happens in the future. His destruction will come soon, and he is not worthy of admiration." Gao Conghui did not initially agree, but after some time, realized what Sun said was right and stated to Sun, "You, Lord, are correct." He also stated to Liang, "I think about what I am enjoying in life, and I believe I already exceed what is proper." So he stopped indulgences and spent his time studying the Confucian classics and history, while decreasing punishments and taxes. This was said to calm the Jingnan realm. Liang thereafter stated his belief that Gao Conghui has matured to such a point that Gao can govern the state without him, and so sought retirement. After Liang's retirement, Gao entrusted the affairs of the state to Sun.

=== After Gao Conghui's rule ===
During the subsequent rules of Gao Conghui's sons Gao Baorong and Gao Baoxu, and Gao Baorong's son Gao Jichong, Sun Guangxian continued to serve as the chief strategist for the state, eventually reaching the rank of deputy military governor of Jingnan—i.e., deputy to the ruler himself, as the rulers of Jingnan continued to carry the title of military governor of Jingnan, as Jingnan remained vassal of the Five Dynasties ruling central China. It was said, though, that when he tried to correct Gao Baoxu's behavior—as Gao Baoxu was prone to building overly luxurious residences, drawing resentment from his people—Gao Baoxu did not listen.

In 963, by which time Gao Jichong was Jingnan's ruler and central China was ruled by the Song dynasty's Emperor Taizu, to which Jingnan remained a vassal—there was a disturbance in the Hunan region (the former territory of Chu), as the region's then-ruler Zhou Baoquan was facing a rebellion by his general Zhang Wenbiao. (Zhou Baoquan's father Zhou Xingfeng had seized control the region after years of disturbance after Chu was destroyed by Southern Tang.) Zhou, who was also the vassal of the Song dynasty, sought aid from Emperor Taizu. Emperor Taizu sent his generals Murong Yanzhao and Li Chuyun (李處耘) south, ostensibly to aid Zhou Baoquan against Zhang, but with the intent of seizing actual control of both the Hunan and Jingnan territories. As Li Chuyun's army headed south, he sent emissaries to Jingnan, asking Gao to allow his army to go through. Gao was apprehensive and initially considered refusing, and his general Li Jingwei (李景威) recommended ambushing the Song army. Gao, however, was also apprehensive of Li Jingwei's strategy. Sun pointed out that given the relative strengths between Song and Jingnan, resistance would bring disaster, and suggested that Gao instead surrender his realm to Li Chuyun. Gao agreed. Li Chuyun quickly arrived at Jingnan's capital Jiangling Municipality (江陵), and Gao surrendered. (Murong and Li Chuyun subsequently were able to seize Zhou's realm as well, allowing Song to take actual control of those two realms, although for some time Gao was allowed to remain as military governor of Jingnan.)

== During the Song dynasty ==
After Gao Jichong's surrender to Song, Sun Guangxian was made the prefect of Huang Prefecture (黃州, in modern Huanggang, Hubei). It was said that he governed the prefecture well, and the chancellors were recommending to the Song emperor that he be made an imperial scholar. However, before that could actually happen, Sun died in 968.

Sun was a prolific writer, writing many essays and historical writings, the most well-known of which was the Beimeng Suoyan (北夢瑣言), which modern historians use to supplement the official histories of the Five Dynasties and Ten Kingdoms period. His sons Sun Wei (孫謂) and Sun Dang (孫讜) were later able to pass the imperial examinations during Song.

== Notes and references ==
- History of Song, vol. 483.
- Spring and Autumn Annals of the Ten Kingdoms, vol. 102.
- Zizhi Tongjian, vols. 275, 279.
- Xu Zizhi Tongjian, vols. 2, 3.
