= Lei Yanwei =

Lei Yanwei (雷彥威) was a warlord of the late Chinese Tang dynasty, who controlled Wuzhen Circuit (武貞, headquartered in modern Changde, Hunan) as its military governor (jiedushi) from his father Lei Man's death in 901 to his overthrow by his younger brother Lei Yangong, probably in 903.

== Background ==
The first historical reference in traditional sources to Lei Yanwei was in 901, when his father Lei Man died, while serving as the military governor of Wuzhen. Upon Lei Man's death, Lei Yanwei claimed the title of acting military governor.

== As jiedushi of Wuzhen ==
By 903, he was referred to as full military governor. In 903, Du Hong, the military governor of nearby Wuchang Circuit (武昌, headquartered in modern Wuhan, Hubei) came under the attack of Li Shenfu, a general under Yang Xingmi the military governor of Huainan Circuit (淮南, headquartered in modern Yangzhou, Jiangsu). Du sought aid from his ally Zhu Quanzhong the military governor of Xuanwu Circuit (宣武, headquartered in modern Kaifeng, Henan). Zhu sent his general Han Qing (韓勍) to aid Du, but apparently judging that his army was not enough to save Du, also elicited aid from Lei Yanwei, as well as Cheng Rui the military governor of Jingnan Circuit (荊南, headquartered in modern Jingzhou, Hubei) and Ma Yin the military governor of Wu'an Circuit (武安, headquartered in modern Changsha, Hunan). Cheng, who was allied with Zhu as well, launched a large fleet and headed for Wuchang, intending to save Du. However, after he departed from Jingnan's capital Jiangling Municipality, Lei sent his officer Ouyang Si (歐陽思) to rendezvous with Ma's officer Xu Dexun, and together, they sacked Jiangling, capturing its population and wealth. This destroyed the morale of Cheng's soldiers, and Cheng was subsequently defeated by Li and committed suicide by drowning.

Lei apparently took over Jiangling for some time, and continuing the practice of his father Lei Man, often pillaged the nearby circuits, such that it was said that the region between Jiangling and Wuchang's capital E Prefecture (鄂州) was depleted of people. However, soon thereafter, Lei Yanwei's younger brother Lei Yangong rose against him and, in alliance with Zhao Kuangning the military governor of Zhongyi Circuit (忠義, headquartered in modern Xiangyang, Hubei), expelled him from Jiangling. That was the last historical reference to Lei Yanwei, and it is not clear based on the traditional sources where he went or what occurred to him afterwards. (As Lei Yangong himself was set to have taken control of Jiangling, and then was expelled by Zhao's brother Zhao Kuangming later in 903, Lei Yangong's rebellion against Lei Yanwei must be in 903 as well.)

== Notes and references ==
- New Book of Tang, vol. 186.
- Zizhi Tongjian, vols. 262, 264.
