= Gao Conghui =

Prince of Nanping from 929 to 948

Prince Wenxian of Nanping 南平文獻王
- Prince of Nanping

Ruler of Jingnan (Nanping)
- Reign: 929 – December 1, 948
- Predecessor: Gao Jixing, Prince Wuxin of Chu
- Successor: Gao Baorong, Prince Zhenyi of Nanping

Jiedushi of Jingnan Circuit (荊南節度使)
- Tenure: 929 – 948
- Predecessor: Gao Jixing
- Successor: Gao Baorong
- Born: 891
- Died: December 1, 948; Jingzhou
- Issue: Gao Baoxun (高保勳) (different person than below); Gao Baozheng (高保正); Gao Baorong (高保融), Prince Zhenyi of Nanping; Gao Baoshen (高保紳); Gao Baoyin (高保寅); Gao Baoxu (高保緒) (different person than below); Gao Baoxu (高保勗) (different person than above); Gao Baojie (高保節); Gao Baoxun (高保遜) (different person than above); Gao Baoheng (高保衡); Gao Baoying (高保膺); Four other sons
Names
- Gao Conghui (高從誨)
Era dates
- Adopted the era name of Yang Wu: Qianzhen (乾貞): 929; Adopted the era names of Later Tang: Tiancheng (天成): 929–930; Changxing (長興): 930–933; Yingshun (應順): 934; Qingtai (清泰): 934–936; Adopted the era names of Later Jin: Tianfu (天福): 936–944; Kaiyun (開運): 944 –946; Adopted the era names of Later Han: Tianfu (天福): 947; Qianyou (乾祐): 948
Regnal name
- 932–934: Prince of Bohai (渤海王); 936–948: Prince of Nanping (南平王)
Posthumous name
- Prince Wénxiàn (文獻王, "civil and wise")
- House: Gao
- Dynasty: Jingnan
- Father: Gao Jixing
- Mother: Lady Zhang

Gao Conghui (Chinese: 高從誨) (891 – December 1, 948), might have been born with or used the name Zhu Conghui (朱從誨), also known by his posthumous name as the Prince Wenxian of Nanping (南平文獻王), courtesy name Zunsheng (遵聖), was a ruler of Jingnan during the Five Dynasties and Ten Kingdoms period of China, reigning from 929 to 948.

== Background ==
Gao Conghui was born in 891, during the reign of Emperor Zhaozong of Tang. At that time, or shortly after his birth, he might have been known by the surname of Zhu—because his father Gao Jichang had become an adoptive son of Zhu Yourang (朱友讓), who in turn was an adoptive son of the major warlord Zhu Quanzhong the military governor of Xuanwu Circuit (宣武, headquartered in modern Kaifeng, Henan). (It was not until later in Gao Jichang's career that his name was changed back to Gao—sometime after 903.) Gao Conghui's mother was a Lady Zhang; it was not clearly stated in the historical accounts whether she was Gao Jichang's wife or concubine, although it was said that Gao Jichang favored her. He was Gao Jichang's oldest son.

Apparently sometime after Gao Jichang was made the military governor of Jingnan Circuit (headquartered in modern Jingzhou, Hubei), and sometime after Zhu Quanzhong had seized the Tang throne and established his own Later Liang as its emperor, Gao Jichang sent Gao Conghui to then-capital Luoyang to serve as an imperial attendant, and he later became the supervisor for cavalry supplies. On a later occasion, when he was given a vacation back to his father's post at Jingnan, Gao Jichang kept him at Jingnan and made him a commander of the Jingnan army. At some point, either during his service at the Later Liang capital or after his return to Jingnan, Gao Conghui successively carried the title of prefect of Hao Prefecture (濠州, in modern Chuzhou, Anhui—then under control of Wu) and prefect of Gui Prefecture (歸州, in modern Yichang, Hubei, one of the Jingnan prefectures).

In 925—by which time Later Liang had been conquered by Later Tang, which Gao Jichang then was a vassal of (and had, therefore, changed his name to Gao Jixing, to observe naming taboo for the Later Tang emperor Li Cunxu's grandfather Li Guochang (and Gao Jixing was carrying the Later Tang-created title of Prince of Nanping))—Li Cunxu launched a major attack to destroy Later Tang's southwestern neighbor Former Shu. As part of the attack, he assigned Gao the task of capturing three of Former Shu's eastern prefectures on the border with Jingnan Circuit, Kui (夔州), Zhong (忠州), and Wan (萬州) (all in modern Chongqing). Gao left Gao Conghui in charge of the Jingnan headquarters and attacked west, but was defeated by the Former Shu general Zhang Wu (張武) and forced to return to Jingnan's capital Jiangling Municipality. (Zhang later surrendered his territory to the overall Later Tang commander Li Jiji, not to Gao Jixing.)

In 926—by which time Former Shu had fallen to Later Tang, but Later Tang itself was then overrun with mutinies—Li Cunxu was killed in a mutiny at Luoyang, and his adoptive brother Li Siyuan succeeded him as emperor. Gao Jixing requested that Kui, Zhong, and Wan become part of his territory, and Li Siyuan initially agreed. However, when the imperial government would not agree to Gao's demand that he himself be allowed to commission those prefects without imperial agreement, Gao seized Kui by force—effectively rebelling against the Later Tang imperial government. Gao Conghui was said to have repeatedly urged Gao Jixing against rebelling against Later Tang, but Gao Jixing did not listen. Subsequently, during his (successful) resistance campaign against the Later Tang army sent against him, Gao instead submitted to Wu as a vassal—an overture that Wu initially rejected but later accepted. Apparently as part of Gao's submission to Wu, Gao Conghui was given the title by Wu's emperor Yang Pu of military governor of Zhongyi Circuit (忠義, headquartered in modern Xiangyang, Hubei, then under Later Tang control); Yang also gave him the honorary chancellor designation Tong Zhongshu Menxia Pingzhangshi (同中書門下平章事).

== Reign ==
=== During Later Tang ===
Around the new year 929, Gao Jixing fell ill, and put Gao Conghui in charge of Jingnan's headquarters. Gao Jixing died shortly after. Yang Pu thereafter gave him the title of military governor of Jingnan, and bestowed on him the greater honorary chancellor title of Shizhong (侍中).

Upon his assumption of Jingnan's governance, however, Gao Conghui believed that it was inadvisable to continue to be inimical to Later Tang and be a vassal to Wu, pointing out that Wu's main territory was much farther away than Later Tang. He therefore, through his southern neighbor Ma Yin the King of Chu, offered apologies to Li Siyuan, and later also made the same request by writing Later Tang's military governor of Shannan East Circuit (山南東道, i.e., the same circuit as Zhongyi), An Yuanxin (安元信). When An relayed his request to Li Siyuan, Li Siyuan agreed to his request to resubmit. He then submitted a petition, referring to himself to only to his former Later Tang-approved titles of commander of the Jingnan army and prefect of Gui Prefecture (i.e., not with the ones that Wu had conferred). Li Siyuan accepted his submission, gave him the titles of military governor of Jingnan and Shizhong, and formally terminated the campaign against Jingnan. (Later Tang had not pursued the campaign actively for several years, but had never formally terminated the campaign.) Gao also submitted a petition to Yang, apologizing for resubmitting to Later Tang, but asking that his decision be excused because he had been concerned that the tombs of the Gao ancestors, located within Later Tang territory, would be destroyed. Wu sent an army to attack Jingnan, but could not capture it.

In 931, Li Siyuan gave Gao the honorary chancellor title Zhongshu Ling (中書令). In 932, he created Gao the Prince of Bohai. In 934, he created Gao the Prince of Nanping—the same title that Gao Jixing had held previously.

It was said that Gao was intelligent, understanding, humble, and willing to listen to others. He particularly trusted Gao Jixing's chief strategist Liang Zhen, treating Liang as an older brother. There was an occasion when people relaying the news to him about the court of Ma Yin's son and successor Ma Xifan, who then carried the title of Prince of Chu, talking of the grandeurs of Ma Xifan's lifestyle. Initially, Gao, impressed, stated, "Prince Ma is truly a man." His staffer Sun Guangxian responded:

The Son of Heaven and his vassals have different rites. That young milk-stenched boy is arrogant and wasteful. He may enjoy it for some time, but he does not think about the future. His state will soon fall. There is no need to be jealous of him.

Gao initially did not realize the wisdom of Sun's words, but after some time, he did. He stated to Liang, "After I thought about my daily living, I believe that I am already excessive." He thus ended using luxurious items, and spent his time enjoying reading classical literature. He also was merciful in punishments and did not impose great tax burdens, so his people were comforted. Liang, believing that the state was in good hands, sought to retire, and after Gao could not dissuade him from the idea, allowed him to, but built a grand mansion for him on an island and would occasionally visited him to give him many gifts. Liang, in retirement, also still occasionally visited him and gave him advice. After Liang's retirement, he entrusted the affairs of the state to Sun.

In 936, believing that Wu's regent Xu Zhigao was interested in seizing the Wu throne, Gao wrote him to encourage him to do so. Xu eventually did so, in 937, ending Wu and establishing Southern Tang, and thereafter changing his name to Li Bian, as Li was his original family name. Subsequently, Gao requested to establish a liaison office at Southern Tang's capital Jinling, and Li Bian agreed.

=== During Later Jin ===
In 941—by which time Later Tang had fallen, and its former territory was ruled by Shi Jingtang (Li Siyuan's son-in-law) as the emperor of the succeeding Later Jin—Later Jin's military governor of Shannan East, An Congjin, was plotting to rebel against Later Jin, and he sent emissaries to ask for aid from both Gao Conghui and Later Shu's emperor Meng Chang. Meng declined the overture, and Gao wrote An, urging him not to rebel. An, in anger, instead reported to Shi that Gao was planning to rebel against Later Jin. At the urging of his commander of the army, Wang Baoyi (王保義), Gao submitted An's letters to Shi, and offered to aid the Later Jin imperial government in coming operations against An. Subsequently, when An did in fact rebel, both Gao and Ma Xifan sent fleets and food supplies to aid the Later Jin commander of the operations against An, Gao Xingzhou. Gao Xingzhou was subsequently able to defeat An, and An committed suicide. After An's defeat, Gao requested Shi's nephew and successor Shi Chonggui that Later Jin gave him Ying Prefecture (郢州, in modern Jingmen, Hubei); Shi Chonggui declined.

=== During Liao and Later Han ===
In a campaign in 946–947, Emperor Taizong of the Khitan Liao dynasty successfully captured Kaifeng and forced Shi Chonggui to surrender, ending Later Jin. Emperor Taizong claimed to also be the emperor of China, and, initially, the Later Jin regional governors submitted to him. Gao Conghui also did so, and offered tributes to him. At the same time, though, Gao also sent emissaries to one of the holdouts, Liu Zhiyuan the military governor of Hedong Circuit (河東, headquartered in modern Taiyuan, Shanxi), urging Liu to claim imperial title. He promised to support Liu if Liu would later give him Ying Prefecture, and Liu agreed.

After the Liao subsequently (in stages, both before and after Emperor Taizong's death later in 947) withdrew from Later Jin lands, Liu, who claimed the title of emperor of a new Later Han, entered Kaifeng. He notified Gao of this. Gao sent an emissary to congratulate the new emperor, and at the same time asked him to fulfill his promise of giving Gao Ying Prefecture. Liu refused, and subsequently, when Liu sent an emissary to bestow honors on Gao, Gao refused to accept the honors. When the Later Han general Du Chongwei later rebelled against Liu at Tianxiong Circuit (天雄, headquartered in modern Handan, Hebei), Gao took the opportunity to attack Shannan East Circuit, but was repelled by its military governor An Shenqi (安審琦). He then attacked Ying, but was repelled by its prefect Yin Shi (尹實). He thereafter cut off his relationship with Later Han, and instead submitted as a vassal to both Southern Tang and Later Shu.

Traditional histories used this incident to comment on the peculiar pattern of conduct that both Gao Conghui and his father Gao Jixing had demonstrated throughout Jingnan's existence. As put by the Song dynasty historian Ouyang Xiu in his New History of the Five Dynasties:

Jingnan's territory is small, and its army was weak. It was a small state wedged between Wu and Chu. At the time that Wu claimed imperial title, Southern Han, Min, and Chu all still followed the era names of Later Liang. Their annual tributary emissaries all would journey through Jingnan. Both Gao Jixing and Gao Conghui often detained the emissaries and seized their tributes. If these other circuits wrote rebuking declarations or attacked Jingnan, then they would return the tributes without showing signs of shame. Later, Southern Han, Min, and Shu all claimed imperial titles. Gao Conghui would refer to himself as "subject" to all of them, to take advantage of their bestowments. ... The other states thus all referred to him as "Scoundrel Gao."

However, cutting off relations with Later Han meant that the merchants and the travelers from Later Han stopped visiting Jingnan, which caused economic stress on the small state. In 948, Gao gave in and petitioned Liu's son and successor Liu Chengyou to again submit to Later Han. Liu Chengyou sent an emissary to comfort him.

In late 948, Gao fell ill, and had his son and deputy military governor Gao Baorong take over the affairs of the state. He died shortly after.

== Notes and references ==
- History of the Five Dynasties, vol. 133.
- New History of the Five Dynasties, vol. 69.
- Zizhi Tongjian, vols. 273, 276, 277, 278, 279, 280, 282, 286, 287, 288.

Regnal titles
Preceded by Gao Jixing (Prince Wuxin)	Ruler of Jingnan/Prince of Nanping; 929–948	Succeeded by Gao Baorong (Prince Zhenyi)
