= 江陵 =

江陵 may refer to:

- Gangneung (강릉), Gangwon province, South Korea
- Jiangling County, Jingzhou, Hubei province, China

== See also ==
- The dictionary definition of 江 at Wiktionary
- The dictionary definition of 陵 at Wiktionary
