= Zhao Kuangning =

Zhao Kuangning (趙匡凝), courtesy name Guangyi (光儀), formally the Prince of Chu (楚王), was a warlord late in the Chinese Tang dynasty, who ruled Zhongyi Circuit (忠義, headquartered in modern Xiangyang, Hubei) as its military governor (jiedushi) from 892 until his defeat in 905 by Zhu Quanzhong the military governor of Xuanwu Circuit (宣武, headquartered in modern Kaifeng, Henan).

== Background ==
It is not known when Zhao Kuangning was born. His father Zhao Deyin had been a general under Qin Zongquan, who was a Tang military governor of Fengguo Circuit (奉國, headquartered in modern Zhumadian, Henan) but who later submitted to the major agrarian rebel Huang Chao and Huang's state of Qi, and, after Huang's defeat, had declared himself emperor of a new state. As part of Zhao Deyin's service under Qin, he captured Shannan East Circuit (山南東道, the later Zhongyi Circuit). Later, knowing that Qin was on the verge of defeat, he submitted to Tang and allied himself with Zhu Quanzhong the Tang military governor of Xuanwu Circuit. At Zhu's recommendation, Zhao Deyin was allowed to remain as military governor of the circuit, which was then renamed Zhongyi. He later participated in the campaigns that led to Qin's destruction.

While Zhao Deyin was the military governor of Zhongyi, Zhao Kuangning was made the prefect of one of Zhongyi's prefectures, Tang Prefecture (唐州, in modern Nanyang, Henan). When Zhao Deyin died in 892, Zhao Kuangning declared himself the acting military governor of Zhongyi. Then-reigning Emperor Zhaozong subsequently commissioned him as the full military governor.

== As jiedushi of Zhongyi ==
It was said that within three years of becoming military governor, Zhao Kuangning had developed a reputation for both might and grace. He played close attention to his physical appearance, wanting to appear stern and well-dressed, and had many mirrors around.

In 898, hearing of Zhu Quanzhong's defeat at the Battle of Qingkou in late 897 during his failed attempt to conquer Yang Xingmi the military governor of Huainan Circuit (淮南, headquartered in modern Yangzhou, Jiangsu), Zhao secretly entered into an alliance with Yang, Cui Hong the military governor of Fengguo, and Li Keyong the military governor of Hedong Circuit (河東, headquartered in modern Taiyuan, Shanxi), against Zhu Quanzhong. Zhu discovered this when Zhao's officer Du Zhen (度軫) defected to Zhu and revealed the alliance. Zhu wrote Zhao to rebuke him, and sent his general Shi Shucong (氏叔琮) to attack Zhongyi. Shi quickly captured Tang, Deng (鄧州, also in modern Nanyang), and Sui (隨州, in modern Suizhou, Hubei) Prefectures, capturing Sui's prefect Zhao Kuanglin (趙匡璘, may be a brother or cousin to Zhao Kuangning) the prefect of Sui and Guo Xiang (國湘) of Deng, and forcing the surrender of Zhao Kuangfan (趙匡璠) the prefect of Tang (also may be a brother or cousin). Zhao Kuangning, in fear, sued for peace and agreed again to submit to Zhu. Zhu agreed.

In 899, Emperor Zhaozong bestowed the honorary chancellor title of Zhongshu Ling (中書令) on Zhao Kuangning.

In 903, when an ally of Zhu's, Cheng Rui the military governor of Jingnan Circuit (荊南, headquartered in modern Jingzhou, Hubei), was trying to, at Zhu's request, aid another ally of Zhu's, Du Hong the military governor of Wuchang Circuit (武昌, headquartered in modern Wuhan, Hubei) against the siege by Yang Xingmi's general Li Shenfu, Lei Yanwei the military governor of Wuzhen Circuit (武貞, headquartered in modern Changde, Hunan) and Ma Yin the military governor of Wu'an Circuit (武安, headquartered in modern Changsha, Hunan) jointly attacked Cheng's capital Jiangling Municipality, sacking it and pillaging it of its wealth and population. Cheng's army, which lost its morale, was subsequently crushed by Li, and Cheng committed suicide. Lei's army held Jiangling for some time, but Zhao then dispatched his brother Zhao Kuangming to attack Jiangling, and Zhao Kuangming was successful in expelling the Wuzhen army and taking over the city. Zhao Kuangning thereafter commissioned his brother as the acting military governor of Jingnan. It was said that at that time, with the imperial government being extremely weak, the warlords were refusing to submit tributes to it, but the Zhao brothers did so yearly.

In 904, Zhao sent an army to head upstream on the Yangtze River to attack Kui Prefecture (夔州, in modern Chongqing), then belonging to Wang Jian the military governor of Xichuan Circuit (西川, headquartered in modern Chengdu, Sichuan). His attack was repelled by Wang's adoptive son Wang Zongruan (王宗阮), and Wang's general Zhang Wu (張武) subsequently built a large iron chain across the Yangtze, apparently to ward off another attack by Zhao. Also in 904, Emperor Zhaozong, who had by that point been forcibly moved by Zhu from the imperial capital Chang'an to Luoyang, created Zhao the Prince of Chu. Despite this creation, Zhao, believing that Zhu was intending to seize the throne, was in communications with Li Keyong, Yang, Wang Jian, Li Maozhen the military governor of Fengxiang Circuit (鳳翔, headquartered in modern Baoji, Shaanxi), Li Maozhen's adoptive son Li Jihui the military governor of Jingnan Circuit (靜難, headquartered in modern Xianyang, Shaanxi, not the same circuit ruled by Zhao Kuangming), and Liu Rengong the military governor of Lulong Circuit (盧龍, headquartered in modern Beijing), declaring that the emperor's power should be restored. Zhu responded by having Emperor Zhaozong assassinated and replaced with his son Emperor Ai.

In 905, Zhao entered into an alliance with Wang, apparently sealing the alliance with a political marriage. This was not a situation that Zhu was willing to see, and when his emissaries to Zhao Kuangning and Zhao Kuangming hinted that he was about to seize the Tang throne, Zhao Kuangning responded by weeping and stating, "I have received much grace from Tang. I cannot have another allegiance." This further angered Zhu. Zhu thus sent his general Yang Shihou to attack Zhao Kuangning, and then followed Yang himself with a larger army. After Yang defeated Zhao on the banks of the Han River, Zhao set fire to his capital Xiang Prefecture (襄州) and fled to Yang Xingmi's domain. (His brother Zhao Kuangming also subsequently abandoned Jiangling and fled to Wang's domain.)

== After defeat ==
When Zhao Kuangning reached Huainan's capital Yang Prefecture (揚州), Yang Xingmi welcomed him, but joked with him, stating, "When you were at your circuit, you yearly delivered gold and silk to Zhu Quanzhong. Is it that now that you come to me only after defeat?" Zhao responded:

When we serve as vassals to the Son of Heaven, it is our responsibility to submit yearly tributes. It was not delivery to the bandit [(i.e., Zhu)]. I come to you today, Lord, precisely because I am not following the bandit.

Yang treated him with great respect, as a result. After Yang died later in the year, it was said that Yang's son and successor Yang Wo did not pay as much respect to Zhao. At a feast, Yang Wo happened to be eating quite a bit of green Chinese plums. Zhao commented, "Do not overeat, or otherwise you will get pediatric fevers." The other officers, hearing this, considered Zhao disrespectful. He was thereafter moved to Hailing (海陵, in modern Taizhou, Jiangsu), and was later executed by Yang Wo's officer Xu Wen.

== Notes and references ==
- New Book of Tang, vol. 186.
- History of the Five Dynasties, vol. 17.
- New History of the Five Dynasties, vol. 41.
- Spring and Autumn Annals of the Ten Kingdoms (十國春秋), vol. 8.
- Zizhi Tongjian, vols. 259, 261, 264, 265.
