= Zhao Kuangming =

Warlord

Zhao Kuangming (趙匡明), courtesy name Zanyao (讚堯), was a warlord late in the Chinese Tang dynasty who controlled Jingnan Circuit (荊南, headquartered in modern Jingzhou, Hubei) from 903 to 905 as its military governor (jiedushi) and formed a power bloc with his brother Zhao Kuangning the military governor of Zhongyi Circuit (忠義, headquartered in modern Xiangyang, Hubei), until both he and his brother were defeated by the major warlord Zhu Quanzhong the military governor of Xuanwu Circuit (宣武, headquartered in modern Kaifeng, Henan). They both fled, allowing Zhu to absorb their territory.

== Background and service under Zhao Kuangning ==
It is not known when Zhao Kuangming was born. His father Zhao Deyin had been a general under Qin Zongquan, who was a Tang military governor of Fengguo Circuit (奉國, headquartered in modern Zhumadian, Henan) but who later submitted to the major agrarian rebel Huang Chao and Huang's state of Qi, and, after Huang's defeat, had declared himself emperor of a new state. As part of Zhao Deyin's service under Qin, he captured Shannan East Circuit (山南東道, the later Zhongyi Circuit). Later, knowing that Qin was on the verge of defeat, he submitted to Tang and allied himself with Zhu Quanzhong the Tang military governor of Xuanwu Circuit. At Zhu's recommendation, Zhao Deyin was allowed to remain as military governor of the circuit, which was then renamed Zhongyi. He later participated in the campaigns that led to Qin's destruction. Zhao Kuangming, as a son of Zhao Deyin's, was given the title of literary officer at Jiangling Municipality (江陵, Jingnan's capital) even in his youth. After he reached adulthood, he had military accomplishments and served successively as the prefect of Xiu (繡州, in modern Guigang, Guangxi) and Xia (峽州, in modern Yichang, Hubei) Prefectures.

In 892, Zhao Deyin died. Zhao Kuangming's older brother Zhao Kuangning claimed the title of acting military governor of Zhongyi, and was later confirmed by then-ruling Emperor Zhaozong as full military governor. At one point, the major warlord Zhu Quanzhong, who had designs on seizing the Tang throne, was rebuffed by Zhao Kuangning when he inquired of Zhao Kuangning's thoughts on the matter. He was angered and sent an army to attack Zhongyi Circuit, but his army was defeated by Zhao Kuangming at Deng Prefecture (鄧州, in modern Nanyang, Henan). Thereafter, under the advice of Zhao Kuangming, Zhao Kuangning entered into an alliance with Wang Jian the military governor of Xichuan Circuit (西川, headquartered in modern Chengdu, Sichuan).

== As ruler of Jingnan ==
In 903, Zhu Quanzhong's ally Cheng Rui the military governor of Jingnan, attempting to save another ally of Zhu's, Du Hong the military governor of Wuchang Circuit (武昌, headquartered in modern Wuhan, Hubei), was defeated in battle by Li Shenfu, a general under Yang Xingmi the military governor of Huainan Circuit (淮南, headquartered in modern Yangzhou, Jiangsu). After Cheng's death, Jiangling was temporarily taken over by the army of Wuzhen Circuit (武貞, headquartered in modern Changde, Hunan), but Zhao Kuangning sent an army to expel the Wuzhen army, and then commissioned Zhao Kuangming as its acting military governor. Emperor Zhaozong (who was by this point under Zhu's physical control) initially commissioned Zhao Kuangming only as the commander of the Jingnan army (行軍司馬, Xingjun Sima) but gave him the honorary title of acting Situ (司徒, one of the Three Excellencies) as well. It was said that at that time, very few warlords were willing to offer tributes to the emperor, but the Zhao brothers regularly did so.

By 905, Zhao Kuangming was referred to as full military governor of Jingnan. That year, Zhu, angry that Zhao Kuangning was in alliance with both Wang Jian and Yang, attacked Zhongyi along with his general Yang Shihou. They defeated the Zhongyi army, and Zhao Kuangning abandoned Zhongyi and fled to Huainan territory. Believing that he could not stand by himself, Zhao Kuangming also planned to flee to Huainan. His son Zhao Chenggui (趙承規) pointed out that if he fled to Huainan as well, Yang might suspect him and Zhao Kuangning given the cumulative strengths of the two brothers in Huainan territory. Zhao Kuangming agreed, and fled to Xichuan instead. Wang Jian treated him as an honored guest and commissioned him as the military governor of Wuxin Circuit (武信, headquartered in modern Suining, Sichuan). Later, after Wang Jian founded Former Shu as its emperor, he made Zhao Kuangming the chief judge of the supreme court (大理卿, Dali Qing) and the minister of public works (工部尚書, Gongbu Shangshu). Zhao Kuangming eventually died at the Former Shu capital Chengdu, but the year is not known.

== Notes and references ==
- New Book of Tang, vol. 186.
- History of the Five Dynasties, vol. 17.
- New History of the Five Dynasties, vol. 41.
- Zizhi Tongjian, vols. 264, 265.
