= Zhao Deyin =

Zhao Deyin (Chinese: 趙德諲) (died 892), formally the Prince of Huai'an (Chinese: 淮安王), was a warlord late in the Chinese dynasty Tang dynasty, who initially served as a general under the pretender emperor Qin Zongquan. When Qin neared defeat, Zhao declared loyalty to Tang instead, and was able to retain control of Zhongyi Circuit (忠義, headquartered in modern Xiangyang, Hubei), which, after his death, was passed to his son Zhao Kuangning.

== Background and service under Qin Zongquan ==
It is not known when Zhao Deyin was born. His family was from Cai Prefecture (蔡州, in modern Zhumadian, Henan). At some point, he became an officer under Qin Zongquan, who was then the Tang military governor (Jiedushi) of Fengguo Circuit (奉國, headquartered at Cai Prefecture). When Qin was involved in the Tang forces' campaigns against the major agrarian rebel Huang Chao, Zhao had battlefield accomplishments and was rewarded by being made the prefect of Shen Prefecture (申州, in modern Xinyang, Henan).

By 884, Huang, whom Qin briefly submitted to, had been defeated and killed, but by that point Qin had become a renegade and was pillaging nearby circuits. When fellow renegade general Lu Yanhong attacked Shannan East Circuit (山南東道, headquartered in modern Xiangfan, Hubei) in winter 884, Qin sent Zhao and Qin Gao (秦誥) to join Lu in the attack, forcing the military governor of Shannan East, Liu Jurong (劉巨容) to abandon Shannan East's capital Xiang Prefecture (襄州) and flee to Chengdu. Lu subsequently took over Zhongwu Circuit (忠武, headquartered in modern Xuchang, Henan), apparently allowing Zhao to take over Shannan East.

In winter 887, by which time Qin had declared himself emperor with his capital at Cai Prefecture, Zhao, still then serving under Qin and whom Qin had made the acting military governor of Shannan East, attacked Jingnan Circuit (荊南, headquartered in modern Jingzhou, Hubei). Zhao captured it and killed the Tang military governor of Jingnan, Zhang Gui. He then left his officer Wang Jianzhao in control of Jingnan's capital Jiangling Municipality. It was said that after the battle, only several hundred households remained at Jiangling. However, in summer 888, the Tang general Guo Yu attacked Jiangling and expelled Wang, taking over Jingnan Circuit.

== Redeclaration of loyalty to Tang ==
After Guo Yu seized Jingnan from Zhao Deyin, Zhao, realizing by that point that Qin Zongquan, who had recently been repeatedly defeated by Zhu Quanzhong, the Tang military governor of Xuanwu Circuit (宣武, headquartered in modern Kaifeng, Henan), was nearing defeat, made overtures to then-reigning Tang emperor Emperor Zhaozong and Zhu, submitting his circuit to Tang. Zhu thus suggested to Emperor Zhaozong that Zhao's submission be accepted and that Zhao be made his own deputy in the operations against Qin. Emperor Zhaozong thus renamed Shannan East to Zhongyi (meaning "faithful and righteous") and made Zhao its military governor as well as the deputy commander of the overall operations against Qin (with Zhu being the commander). After Qin was deposed by his own officers and delivered to Zhu (and eventually delivered to the imperial capital Chang'an to be executed in spring 889), Zhao was given the honorary chancellor designation of Zhongshu Ling (中書令) and was created the Prince of Huai'an. He died in spring 892 and was succeeded by his son Zhao Kuangning.

== Notes and references ==
- New Book of Tang, vol. 186.
- Zizhi Tongjian, vols. 256, 257, 258, 259.
