= Zhu Yanshou =

Zhu Yanshou (朱延壽; 870–903) was an officer under, and the brother-in-law of, the major warlord Yang Xingmi the military governor (Jiedushi) of Huainan Circuit (淮南, headquartered in modern Yangzhou, Jiangsu) late in the Chinese Tang dynasty. He contributed to many of Yang's campaigns and eventually rose to the rank of military governor of Fengguo Circuit (奉國, headquartered in modern Zhumadian, Henan, although Zhu did not actually control it). In 903, angry that Yang had previously insulted him, he plotted to rebel against Yang, along with other vassals of Yang's, Tian Jun the military governor of Ningguo Circuit (寧國, headquartered in modern Xuancheng, Anhui) and An Renyi (安仁義) the military prefect of Run Prefecture (潤州, in modern Zhenjiang, Jiangsu). Their plot was discovered by Yang, who then tricked his wife (Zhu's sister) Lady Zhu into reporting to Zhu Yanshou that Yang was about to entrust Huainan Circuit to him. When Zhu reported to Huainan's capital Yang Prefecture (揚州) in response, Yang Xingmi executed him.

== Background ==
Zhu Yanshou was born in 870 and from Shucheng (舒城, in modern Lu'an, Anhui). He appeared to be the third son among his siblings — with descriptions suggesting that he had younger brothers as well — and he had at least one older sister, who married the Huainan Circuit army officer Yang Xingmi at some point.

== Service under Yang Xingmi ==
It was said that Zhu Yanshou had much contributions serving under Yang Xingmi in Yang's campaigns to eventually rule Huainan, against other contenders Qin Yan, Bi Shiduo, Zhao Huang, and Sun Ru, although the first concrete reference to Zhu's acts was in 891 when Sun, then in control of Huainan's capital Yang Prefecture (揚州), was set to attack Yang Xingmi, who was then at Xuan Prefecture (宣州, in modern Xuancheng, Anhui). Yang Xingmi sent Zhu and Liu Wei (劉威) to engage Sun at Huangchi (黃池, in modern Wuhu, Anhui), but Zhu and Liu were defeated by Sun. (Sun's advances were subsequently hampered by severe flooding, however, and he withdrew.)

In 892, Sun was again attacking Yang at Xuan Prefecture, but was defeated and killed on the battlefield, allowing Yang to finally take over Huainan Circuit. Yang kept Zhu under him at Yang Prefecture, where he developed a reputation for willingness to execute people for offenses. At that time, there was much banditry at Yang Prefecture, but Yang wanted to appear lenient, so whenever bandits were captured, he would release them and allow them to take their plunders, stating to them, "Do not let Zhu Yanshou know about this," but instead secretly informing Zhu himself so that Zhu would arrest and kill them.

In 894, Wu Tao (吳討) the prefect of Huang Prefecture (黃州, in modern Wuhan, Hubei), who was under Du Hong the military governor of Wuchang Circuit (武昌, headquartered in modern Wuhan), offered to submit to Yang Xingmi. In response, Du put Huang Circuit under siege. Yang sent Zhu to aid Wu. When another subordinate of Du's, Feng Jingzhang (馮敬章) the prefect of Qi Prefecture (蘄州, in modern Huanggang, Hubei) tried to intercept Zhu, Zhu put Qi Prefecture under siege but was initially unable to capture it. However, it appeared that subsequently, after Wu evacuated Huang Prefecture, Yang's forces were nevertheless able to hold it.

In 895, Yang was attacking Shou Prefecture (壽州, in modern Lu'an), whose previously deceased prefect Jiang Yanwen (江彥溫) had earlier submitted to Yang's rival Zhu Quanzhong the military governor of Xuanwu Circuit (宣武, headquartered in modern Kaifeng, Henan). The siege was initially unsuccessful, and Yang was set to withdraw, when Zhu requested that he be allowed one more opportunity to capture it, and he did, taking Jiang's son and successor Jiang Congxu (江從勗) captive. Yang made Zhu the deputy military governor of Huainan, and then the military prefect (團練使, Tuanlianshi) of Shou Prefecture. When Xuanwu forces subsequently counterattacked with several tens of thousands of soldiers, Zhu only had several thousand soldiers. He sent the officer Li Hou (李厚) with 250 cavalry soldiers to try to repel the Xuanwu soldiers, but Li was unable to do succeed. Zhu was set to execute him, but due to Li's own plea and those of fellow officer Chai Zaiyong (柴再用), agreed to give Li 125 more soldiers to try again. With Li fighting to the death, aided by Chai and Zhu himself, the Xuanwu army was repelled.

In 896, Zhu again put Qi Prefecture under siege, but was initially unable to capture it due to the efforts of Feng and Feng's officer Jia Gongduo (賈公鐸). Chai volunteered to try to persuade Jia to surrender, and after Chai analyzed the situation with Jia, both Jia and Feng surrendered. Zhu then further attacked and captured Guang Prefecture (光州, in modern Xinyang, Henan), killing its prefect Liu Cun (劉存).

In 897, Zhu Quanzhong launched a major attack on Huainan, having his general Pang Shigu (龐師古) head directly toward Yang Prefecture, while sending another general, Ge Congzhou, to attack Shou Prefecture. Zhu repelled Ge's initial attacks, and after Yang Xingmi and Zhu Jin defeated and killed Pang at the Battle of Qingkou (清口, in modern Huai'an, Jiangsu), Ge withdrew. Zhu gave chase and inflicted severe losses on Ge's army, although Ge himself escaped.

In 902, with then-reigning Emperor Zhaozong under siege by Zhu Quanzhong at Fengxiang Circuit (鳳翔, headquartered in modern Baoji, Shaanxi), (after having forcibly been taken there by the powerful eunuchs, led by Han Quanhui, in 901 and with the leading chancellor Cui Yin then encouraging Zhu to attack Fengxiang to retrieve the emperor), Emperor Zhaozong issued an edict creating Yang the Prince of Wu and making him the supreme commander of the southeastern circuits, ordering him to attack Zhu Quanzhong. As part of the order, Zhu Yanshou was made the military governor of Fengguo Circuit, even though he did not then possess Fengguo's traditional capital Cai Prefecture (蔡州).

Zhu was said to be a strict governor, who liked to be outnumbered on the battlefield. On one occasion, when he sent 200 men to engage Xuanwu forces, there was another soldier who was supposed to remain, but who asked to go to fight the Xuanwu forces. Zhu, stating that he had violated orders, executed him.

== Death ==
Over the years, Zhu Yanshou's anger toward his brother-in-law Yang Xingmi had grown, because Yang had repeatedly made fun of him. When two other vassals of Yang's, Tian Jun the military governor of Ningguo Circuit and An Renyi the military prefect of Run Prefecture, rebelled against Yang in 903, Tian sent messengers to Zhu to invite him to join the rebellion. Tian's initial messengers were intercepted (and killed) by Yang's officer Shang Gongnai (尚公乃), but eventually Tian's messenger Du Xunhe (杜荀鶴) arrived at Shou Prefecture and persuaded Zhu to join the rebellion.

However, Zhu's involvement soon became known by Yang. Yang pretended to be going blind in the presence of Zhu's messengers to him and also in the presence of Lady Zhu. He stated to Lady Zhu, "It is unfortunate that I'm going blind. The children are all young. I will entrust the headquarters to their third uncle [(i.e., Zhu Yanshou)]." Lady Zhu related this to Zhu Yanshou, and he believed this to be true. When Yang sent a messenger to summon him, then, he decided to report to Yang Prefecture, against the advice of his wife Lady Wang. Lady Wang, however, was able to persuade him to send a messenger to her daily so that she could be assured that he was still safe.

Meanwhile, Yang had his guard commander Xu Wen prepare for Zhu's arrival. When Zhu reached Yang Prefecture, Yang welcomed him into the bedroom, and then surprised and killed him there. His soldiers were initially panicking, but Xu comforted them, and they submitted to Xu. Yang then slaughtered Zhu's brothers and divorced Lady Zhu. Meanwhile, when Lady Wang saw one day that no messenger was arriving, she knew that something was wrong, and she armed her servants. When soldiers from Yang Prefecture arrived to arrest her and the other family members, she was able to defend the mansion for some time. She gathered the treasures and set fire to the mansion, stating, "I will not let my pure body be humiliated by the enemies." She then jumped into the fire and died.

== Notes and references ==
- New Book of Tang, vol. 189.
- History of the Five Dynasties, vol. 17.
- Zizhi Tongjian, vols. 258, 259, 260, 261, 263, 264.
- Spring and Autumn Annals of the Ten Kingdoms (十國春秋), vol. 13.
