= Gao Baoxu =

Ruler of Jingnan from 960 to 962

Gao Baoxu 高保勗
- Jiedushi of Jingnan Circuit

4th ruler of Jingnan (Nanping)
- Reign: 960–962
- Predecessor: Gao Baorong, Prince Zhenyi of Nanping
- Successor: Gao Jichong

Jiedushi of Jingnan Circuit (荊南節度使)
- Tenure: 960–962
- Predecessor: Gao Baorong
- Successor: Gao Jichong
- Born: 924
- Died: 962 (aged 37–38)
Names
- Gao Baoxu (高保勗)
- House: Gao
- Dynasty: Jingnan
- Father: Gao Conghui

Gao Baoxu (924–962), courtesy name Xinggong (省躬), was the fourth ruler of Jingnan during the Five Dynasties and Ten Kingdoms period of China, reigning from 960 to 962. He was the tenth son of Jingnan's second ruler Gao Conghui (Prince Wenxian), and the younger brother of Jingnan's third ruler Gao Baorong (Prince Zhenyi).

Gao Baoxu has been described as a profligate and licentious ruler. He would summon prostitutes and muscular soldiers to his palace for group orgies in broad daylight, while he and his concubines watched from behind a curtain. Wasteful construction projects also caused widespread resentment among the population and the army. He cared little about governance, and Sun Guangxian's advice largely fell on deaf ears. He became critically ill 2 years into his reign, and on his death bed he decided to pass the throne to his nephew, Gao Baorong's son Gao Jichong, after consulting Liang Yansi (梁延嗣).
