= Li Shenfu =

Military general from the Tang dynasty (died 904)

Li Shenfu (李神福; died 904) was a general who served under the major warlord Yang Xingmi the military governor (jiedushi) of Huainan Circuit (淮南, headquartered in modern Yangzhou, Jiangsu) late in the Chinese Tang dynasty.

== Background ==
It is not known when Li Shenfu was born, but it is known that he was from Ming Prefecture (洺州, in modern Handan, Hebei). He became a soldier in the army of Zhaoyi Circuit (昭義, headquartered in modern Changzhi, Shanxi), which Ming Prefecture belonged to, and was later posted to Huainan Circuit when Gao Pian the military governor of Huainan served as the overall commander of the operations against the agrarian rebel Huang Chao. He was later assigned to Lu Prefecture (廬州, in modern Hefei, Anhui) to serve under Gao's subordinate Yang Xingmin (who would later be renamed Yang Xingmi) the prefect of Lu.

== Service under Yang Xingmi ==
=== Initial service ===
In 884, there was an occasion when the agrarian rebel Chen Ru (陳儒) attacked Shu Prefecture (舒州, in modern Anqing, Anhui); Shu's prefect Gao Yu (高澞, Gao Pian's nephew) sought aid from Yang Xingmi. Yang consulted with Li Shenfu, who stated that he could repel Chen without fighting. Yang thus sent Li to aid Gao Yu. Li took many banners bearing the insignia of the Lu army and secretly got into Shu's main city. He then gave the banners to the Shu soldiers, and the Shu soldiers thereafter advanced out of the city bearing the Lu banners. The rebels under Chen, believing that a large detachment had arrived from Lu, fled.

In 886, Zhang Ao (張翱) the prefect of Shou Prefecture (壽州, in modern Lu'an, Anhui) sent his officer Wei Qian (魏虔) to attack Lu. Yang sent Li, Tian Jun, and Zhang Xun (張訓) to resist, and they repelled Wei's attack.

=== During the campaign against Sun Ru ===
In 887, a mutiny by the Huainan officer Bi Shiduo against Gao Pian and Gao's favorite sorcerer Lü Yongzhi triggered an internecine war that had Bi, Lü, Yang Xingmi, and Qin Yan contending for the control of Huainan, which eventually was taken by Sun Ru. Yang, in turn, advanced south and took Ningguo Circuit (寧國, headquartered in modern Xuancheng, Anhui) and became its military governor.

In 891, Sun took his army and advanced south, intending to destroy Yang. In an initial confrontation, Li Shenfu surprised Sun's advance troops and defeated them. Later in the year, Yang also sent Li to attack He (和州, in modern Chaohu, Anhui) and Chu (滁洲, in modern Chuzhou, Anhui) prefectures, defeating the Sun-commissioned prefects Kang Wang (康暀) and An Jingsi (安景思); Kang surrendered, and An fled.

By spring 892, however, with Sun's much larger army approaching Ningguo's capital Xuan Prefecture (宣州), Yang considered abandoning Xuan Prefecture and fleeing, but did not do so after Li and Liu Wei (劉威) advised against it. Yang thereafter was able to bog Sun's attack down and defeated and killed Sun in a decisive battle in fall 892.

=== Campaigns against Cai Chou ===
After Sun Ru's defeat, Cai Chou (蔡儔), whom Yang Xingmi had previously made the prefect of Lu but who then surrendered to Sun when Sun attacked, tried to submit to Zhu Quanzhong the military governor of Xuanwu Circuit (宣武, headquartered in modern Kaifeng, Henan). Zhu, however, considered Cai unreliable and refused to launch an army to aid Cai, and instead informed what Cai was doing to Yang. Yang thereafter sent Li Shenfu to attack Cai. Later, Tian Jun and Yang himself also joined Li's siege of Lu Prefecture. In fall 893, the city fell, and Yang executed Cai. Subsequently, Cai's ally Ni Zhang (倪章) the prefect of Shu Prefecture fled. Yang thus made Li the prefect of Shu.

=== Campaigns against Qian Liu ===
In fall 901, Yang received a (false) report that Qian Liu the military governor of Zhenhai (鎮海, headquartered in modern Hangzhou, Zhejiang) and Zhendong (鎮東, headquartered in modern Shaoxing, Zhejiang) Circuits had been assassinated. He thus sent Li to try to take Zhenhai's capital Hang Prefecture (杭州) in (what he thought to be) the confusion of Qian's death. Qian sent the general Gu Quanwu (顧全武) to resist him. They stalemated for some time. Li then allowed captives from Gu's army to overhear a conversation in which he stated that he was going to retreat that night due to the length of the stalemate, and then allowed the captives to flee. He then began what appeared to be a withdraw but had his subordinate Lü Shizao (呂師造) lay a trap for Gu. Gu, who did not respect Li, gave chase, and fell into the trap that Li and Lü had set. Li soundly defeated Gu's army and captured him. Li then attacked Lin'an (臨安, in modern Hangzhou, Qian's hometown), but could not capture it quickly. By this point, he had found out that Qian had not died, and so wanted to withdraw, but he feared that Qian would give chase. He therefore carefully protected the tombs of Qian's ancestors and allowed Gu, whom Qian valued greatly, to write letters to report that he was safe. Qian sent an emissary to thank Li. When Li pretended to have received a large reinforcement from Huainan, Qian sued for peace and sent gifts. Li, after receiving Qian's gifts, withdrew.

In 902, Yang made Li the prefect of Sheng Prefecture (昇州, in modern Nanjing, Jiangsu).

=== Campaigns against Du Hong ===
In spring 903, Yang Xingmi made Li Shenfu the commander (行軍司馬, Xingjun Sima) of the Huainan army and put him in command of an army to attack Du Hong the military governor of Wuchang Circuit (武昌, headquartered in modern Wuhan, Hubei), with Liu You (劉有) serving as his deputy. He quickly captured Yongxing (永興, in modern Huanggang, Hubei), cutting off the food supplies for Wuchang. He then put Wuchang's capital E Prefecture (鄂州) under siege.

Du sought aid from Zhu Quanzhong, but at that time, Zhu was only able to send a small detachment commanded by Han Qing (韓勍), who could not lift the siege. Zhu thereafter made requests to Cheng Rui the military governor of Jingnan Circuit (荊南, headquartered in modern Jingzhou, Hubei), Ma Yin the military governor of Wu'an Circuit (武安, headquartered in modern Changsha, Hunan), and Lei Yanwei the military governor of Wuzhen Circuit (武貞, headquartered in modern Changde, Hunan), asking them to save Du. Only Cheng launched a fleet to try to save Du, though. Further, as soon as Cheng left his capital Jiangling, Ma's officer Xu Dexun and Lei's officer Ouyang Si (歐陽思) rendezvoused and jointly attacked Jiangling, sacking it and taking its population and treasures before withdrawing. When the news arrived at Cheng's fleet, Cheng's soldiers' morale was destroyed. Li subsequently crushed him, and he committed suicide by drowning. When Han heard of Cheng's death, he also withdrew, leaving Du with no aid.

=== Campaigns against Tian Jun ===
However, another event would (for the time being) save Du. Tian Jun, who was the military governor of Ningguo at the time under Yang, had long wanted to expand his territory but was repeatedly curbed in that ambition by Yang, and therefore began to resent Yang. Li, seeing this, had warned Yang about Tian and urged Yang to react preemptively, but Yang refused, pointing out that Tian had great contributions and that acting against him first would destroy the army morale. In fall 903, Tian and An Renyi (安仁義) the military prefect of Run Prefecture (潤州, in modern Zhenjiang, Jiangsu) rose against Yang. In light of Tian's rebellion, Yang ordered Li to withdraw from Wuchang and attack Ningguo. Fearing that Du would attack him from the rear, Li announced to his soldiers that he was heading west to seize Jingnan, and only after he was out of E Prefecture's vicinity did, he informed the soldiers of Tian's rebellion and their actual mission.

Meanwhile, Tian had launched a surprise attack on Sheng Prefecture and taken Li's wife and children. He initially treated them well, and he sent an emissary to Li, stating, "If you, Lord, take this opportunity properly, I will divide the lands with you so that we can both be princes. If not, your wife and children will not survive." Li stated to his army,

Ever since I was a soldier I have served the Prince of Wu [(i.e., Yang)]. Now I have become a major general. I will surely not alter my allegiance on account of wife and children. Tian Jun has an elderly mother, but he does not care what would happen to her and rebelled anyway. He does not even know of the three proper relations [(i.e., the Confucian principles governing sovereign-subject, father-son, and husband-wife relationships)]. How can I even discuss these matters with him?

Li executed Tian's emissary and continued to advance toward Ningguo, encountering Tian's officers Wang Tan (王壇) and Wang Jian (汪建) at Jiyang Banks (吉陽磯, in modern Chizhou, Anhui). When Wang Tan and Wang Jian displayed Li's son Li Chengding (李承鼎) on the battlefield, Li ordered his soldiers to fire arrows anyway. He thereafter engaged Wang Tan and Wang Jian and pretended to suffer initial losses. He then pretended to retreat, inducing Wang Tan and Wang Jian to chase him, and then counterattacked, inflicting heavy losses on them. When Tian heard this, he personally led a fleet against Li. Li initially set up camps and refused to engage Tian, while sending suggestions to Yang that he use this opportunity to send another general to directly attack Xuan Prefecture. Yang thereafter sent Tai Meng (臺濛) and Wang Maozhang to do so.

Tian, hearing that Tai was heading directly toward Xuan Prefecture, withdrew to engage Tai, while leaving Wang Tan, Wang Jian, and Guo Xingcong (郭行悰) at Wuhu (蕪湖, in modern Wuhu, Anhui) to defend against Li. When Tai subsequently defeated him at Guangde (廣德, in modern Xuancheng) and forced him to flee back to Xuan Prefecture to defend it, Wang Tan, Wang Jian, and Guo surrendered to Li. Subsequently, when Tian made one final attempt to counterattack against Tai, Tai defeated him again and killed him on the battlefield. His soldiers surrendered, allowing the Huainan army to retake Ningguo. Yang commissioned Li as the new military governor of Ningguo, but Li, pointing out that he had not yet defeated Du, refused to accept the position, and instead headed west again to attack Du.

== Death ==
In summer 904, while sieging E Prefecture, Li fell ill and returned to Huainan's capital Guangling (廣陵). Yang sent Liu Cun to replace him as the commander of the operations against Du. Li died soon thereafter. (Liu would capture E Prefecture in spring 905, allowing Wuchang to come under Yang's control.)

== Notes and references ==
- Spring and Autumn Annals of the Ten Kingdoms (十國春秋), vol. 5.
- Zizhi Tongjian, vols. 255, 256, 258, 259, 262, 263, 264, 265.
