= Gao Jichong =

Ruler of Jingnan from 962 to 963

Gao Jichong 高繼沖
- Jiedushi of Jingnan Circuit

5th and last ruler of Jingnan (Nanping)
- Reign: 962–963
- Predecessor: Gao Baoxu
- Successor: None

Jiedushi of Jingnan Circuit (荊南節度使)
- Tenure: 962–963
- Predecessor: Gao Baoxu
- Successor: Wang Renshan

Jiedushi of Wuning Circuit (武寧軍節度使)
- Tenure: 963–973
- Predecessor: Guo Congyi
- Successor: Wang Quanbin
- Born: 943; Jingzhou
- Died: 973 (aged 29–30); Xuzhou
Names
- Surname: Gāo (高); Given name: Jìchōng (繼沖); Courtesy name: Chénghé (成和)
- House: Gao
- Dynasty: Jingnan
- Father: Gao Baorong

Gao Jichong (Chinese: 高繼沖) (943–973) was the last ruler of Jingnan during China's Five Dynasties and Ten Kingdoms period. He ruled from 962 to 963 until his country was overrun by Northern Song forces with little resistance.

In the year of 962, Jichong's predecessor Baoxu died. He was then appointed Jiedushi of Jingnan region by the Northern Song court. This was only a ceremonial act since the jiedushi realm of Jingnan remained de facto an independent country.

Later in the year of 962, Zhou Xingfeng, Jiedushi of Wuping died, leaving his son Zhou Baoquan in power. Zhang Wenbiao Prefecture of Heng, a general under Baoquan's command rebelled against Baoquan and consequently drew the attention of the central government. Armed forces were sent to put down Zhang's rebellion. When the Song army was passing through the Jingnan, it easily took control of the capital city of Jingnan, Jiangling. The Song forces did not meet much resistance since Jichong ordered his forces to surrender immediately knowing that it is impossible for him to keep his country any longer under such dire situations.

After the dissolution of the state of Jingnan, he worked as a local officer in Xuzhou. He died in the year 973.
