= Cheng Rui =

Warlord in the Chinese Tang dynasty

Cheng Rui (Chinese: 成汭; pinyin: Chéng Ruì; died 10 June 903), adoptive name Guo Yu (郭禹; Guō Yǔ, used until c. 888), formally the Prince of Shanggu (上谷王; Shànggǔ Wáng), was a warlord late in the Chinese Tang dynasty who ruled Jingnan Circuit (荊南 headquartered in modern Jingzhou, Hubei) from 888 to 903, until he was defeated in battle. He was known to be a capable administrator who treated his people well.

== Background ==
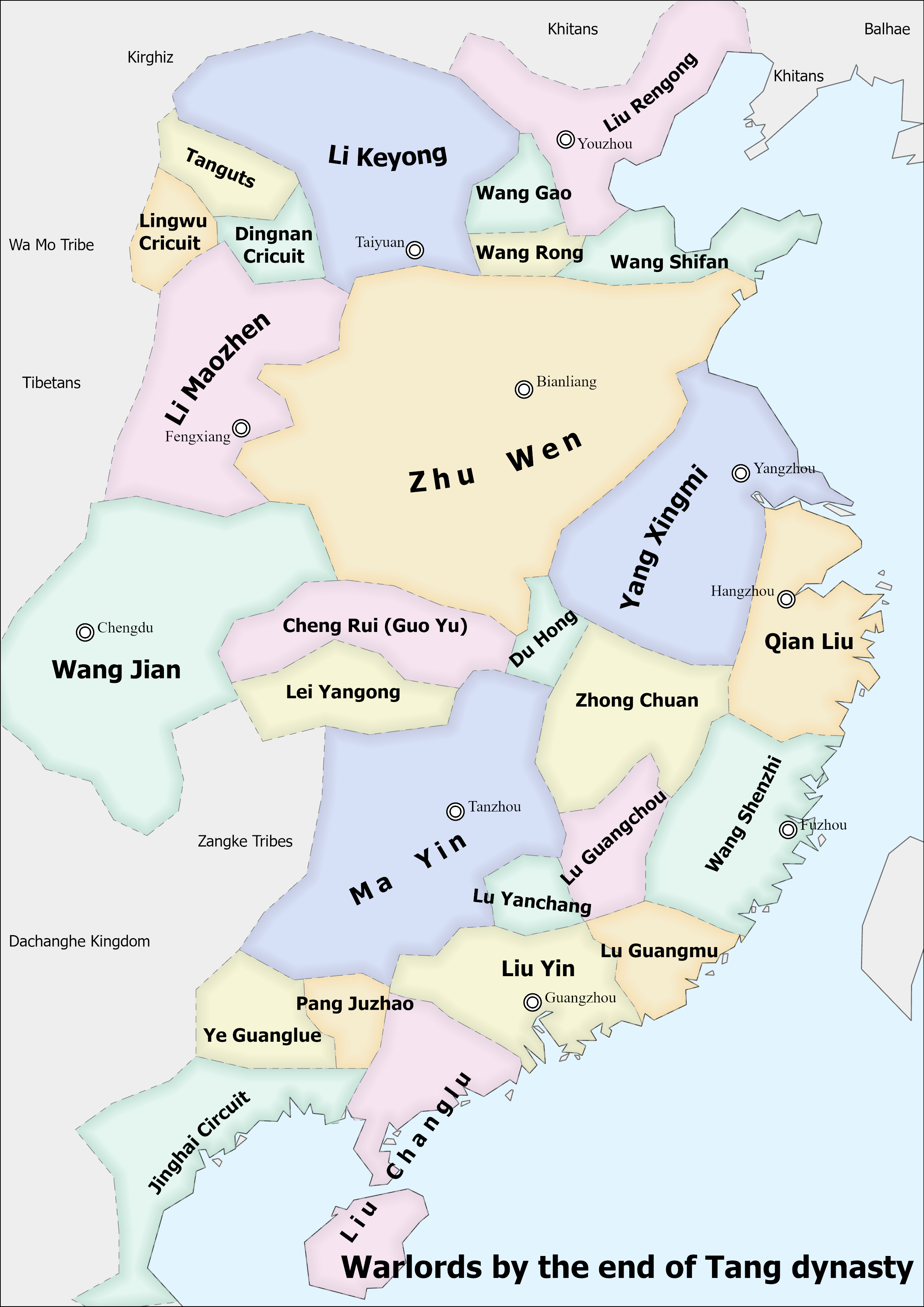
Map of warlords before the end of Tang dynasty, with the territory controlled by Cheng Rui

It is not known when Cheng Rui was born, but it is known that he was from Qing Prefecture (青州, in modern Weifang, Shandong). In his youth, he had once killed another person when drunk, and thereafter fled from his home prefecture in order to avoid vengeance. He became a Buddhist monk for a while, but later joined as a soldier under Tang rebel general Qin Zongquan at Cai Prefecture (蔡州, in modern Zhumadian, Henan). He was adopted by one of Qin's generals and thereafter changed his name to Guo Yu.

At a later point, Guo Yu left Qin's army and became a bandit in Huomen Mountain (火門山, in modern Tianmen, Hubei). He eventually surrendered to Chen Ru the military governor of Jingnan Circuit and became an officer there.

In 885, Chen Ru was overthrown by Zhang Gui, who took over the circuit and arrested Chen. Zhang was apprehensive of Guo's ferocity and wanted to kill him. When Guo realized this, he took some 1,000 men and fled from Jingnan's capital Jiangling. He attacked and captured Gui Prefecture (歸州, in modern Yichang, Hubei), claiming the title of prefect.

In 887, Qin's general Zhao Deyin attacked and captured Jingnan Circuit, executing Zhang. He left his officer Wang Jianzhao at Jiangling to defend it. In summer 888, Guo attacked Jiangling and expelled Wang, who fled to Qian Prefecture (黔州, in modern Chongqing). Then-reigning Emperor Zhaozong commissioned Guo as acting military governor and later full military governor. At Guo's request, Emperor Zhaozong also allowed him to change his name back to Cheng Rui.

== Early rule ==
It was said that at that time, after all the warfare and disturbances, there were only 17 households left in the once-prosperous city of Jiangling. Cheng ruled diligently, gathering the refugees back, encouraged them to farm and conduct business. As of a later point of his rule, the city had grown to having 10,000 households. (In this endeavor, he was compared to another warlord, Han Jian the prefect of Hua Prefecture (華州, in modern Weinan, Shaanxi), and they were referred to in the people's praises as "Han to the north and Guo to the south.") In 892, Emperor Zhaozong bestowed the honorary chancellor designation of Tong Zhongshu Menxia Pingzhangshi (同中書門下平章事) on him.

== Late rule ==
In 896, Cheng Rui and his officer Xu Cun (許存) headed upstream (west) on the Yangtze River and attacked Wang Jianzhao, whom Emperor Zhaozong had made the military governor of Wutai Circuit (武泰, headquartered at Qian Prefecture). He quickly defeated Wang, who abandoned Qian Prefecture and retreated to Fengdu (豐都, in modern Chongqing). Xu subsequently captured Yu (渝州) and Fu (涪州) Prefectures (both in modern Chongqing) as well. However, Cheng made another officer, Zhao Wu (趙武), the acting military governor of Wutai, while only making Xu the prefect of Wan Prefecture (萬州, in modern Chongqing). Later, believing that Xu was planning to rebel, Cheng sent an army to attack him; Xu fled to Chengdu and submitted to Wang Jian the military governor of Xichuan Circuit (西川, headquartered in modern Chengdu, Sichuan).

As the result of the Wutai campaign, Cheng seized control of the Yun'an salt mines (which, in peaceful times, would have been under the control of the imperial government's directorate of salt and iron monopolies). He was therefore able to enrich his circuit and build up an army of 50,000 men. In 897, Emperor Zhaozong bestowed the honorary chancellor title of Shizhong (侍中) on Cheng, and in 899 bestowed the honorary chancellor title of Zhongshu Ling (中書令) on Cheng. Eventually, the imperial government also bestowed him with the titles of acting Taiwei (太尉, one of the Three Excellencies) and Prince of Shanggu. However, it was said that much of Cheng's excellence in governance was driven by his advisor He Yin (賀隱). He Yin was later replaced by Cheng's father-in-law, who was said to be pernicious and who even falsely accused Cheng's own sons, each of whom was killed by Cheng himself, leading to Cheng's not having any descendants. At some point, Cheng complained to the imperial government that the warlord Lei Man was occupying Li (澧州) and Lang (朗州) Prefectures (both in modern Changde, Hunan), both of which formerly belonged to Jingnan, and requested that those prefectures, which had been made into a separate Wuzhen Circuit (武貞) to accommodate Lei, be returned to Jingnan. The chancellor Xu Yanruo refused. When Xu was removed from his chancellor position in 900 and made the military governor of Qinghai Circuit (清海, headquartered in modern Guangzhou, Guangdong) and went through Jiangling to his post, Cheng held a feast for him but again brought up the Lei matter at the feast. Xu responded that as Cheng viewed himself as comparable to Duke Huan of Qi and Duke Wen of Jin, he should have taken care of Lei himself rather than complain to the imperial government, and this embarrassed Cheng.

== Defeat and death ==
In 903, Yang Xingmi the military governor of Huainan Circuit (淮南, headquartered in modern Yangzhou, Jiangsu) sent his general Li Shenfu to attack Du Hong the military governor of Wuchang Circuit (武昌, headquartered in modern Wuhan, Hubei). Du sought aid from Zhu Quanzhong the military governor of Xuanwu Circuit (宣武, headquartered in modern Kaifeng, Henan), who was then the most powerful warlord in the Tang realm. Zhu sent his officer Han Qing (韓勍) to try to aid Du, but apparently judging his army to be insufficient, also sent emissaries to Cheng, Ma Yin the military governor of Wu'an Circuit (武安, headquartered in modern Changsha, Hunan), and Lei Man's son and successor Lei Yanwei, asking them to save Du. Cheng, who was both apprehensive of Zhu's strength and wanting to expand his own territory, put together a huge fleet of some 10,000 men and headed east on the Yangtze. His secretary Li Ting (李珽), who pointed out that the fleet, while massive, was not maneuverable and would not fight well against the more mobile Huainan fleet, opposed. Li also warned that if Cheng tried to take the fleet to save Du, Ma and Lei would attack. Instead, Li advised that Cheng send a smaller army to Baling (巴陵, in modern Yueyang, Hunan) to try to intimidate the Huainan forces into withdrawing, without committing the main fleet. Cheng did not listen to Li.

As Cheng's fleet progressed, Ma's officer Xu Dexun and Lei's officer Ouyang Si (歐陽思) jointly launched a surprise attack on Jiangling, capturing it. They pillaged the city of its population and wealth before withdrawing. When the news of Jiangling's being plundered reached Cheng's fleet, the soldiers, most of whom lost their families and homes, lost their morale. Meanwhile, Li Shenfu, hearing of Cheng's impending arrival, took initiative and attacked Cheng's fleet first. The Jingnan fleet collapsed, and Cheng jumped into the river to flee but drowned. In 906, at Zhu's request, Emperor Zhaozong allowed Zhu to build temples dedicated to Cheng and Du (who was, after Cheng's defeat, captured and executed by Yang).
