= Gao Baorong =

Prince of Nanping from 948 to 960

Prince Zhenyi of Nanping 南平貞懿王
- Prince of Nanping (more...)

3rd ruler of Jingnan (Nanping)
- Reign: 948–960
- Predecessor: Gao Conghui, Prince Wenxian of Nanping
- Successor: Gao Baoxu

Jiedushi of Jingnan Circuit (荊南節度使)
- Tenure: 948 – 960
- Predecessor: Gao Conghui
- Successor: Gao Baoxu
- Born: 920
- Died: 960 (aged 39–40)
- Issue: Gao Jichong
Names
- Gao Baorong (高保融)
Era dates
- Adopted the era names of Later Han: Qianyou (乾祐): 948–950; Adopted the era names of Later Zhou: Guangshun (廣順): 951–953; Xiande (顯德): 954–960
Regnal name
- 951–954: Commandery Prince of Bohai (渤海郡王); 954–960: Prince of Nanping (南平王)
Posthumous name
- Prince Zhenyi (貞懿王)
- House: Gao
- Dynasty: Jingnan
- Father: Gao Conghui

Gao Baorong (Chinese: 高保融) (920–960), courtesy name Dechang (德長), also known by his posthumous name as the Prince Zhenyi of Nanping (南平貞懿王), was a ruling prince of Jingnan from 948 to 960, during the Five Dynasties and Ten Kingdoms period of China.
