= Jingnan =

10th-century Chinese kingdom

Jingnan (Nanping) 荆南 (南平)
- 924–963
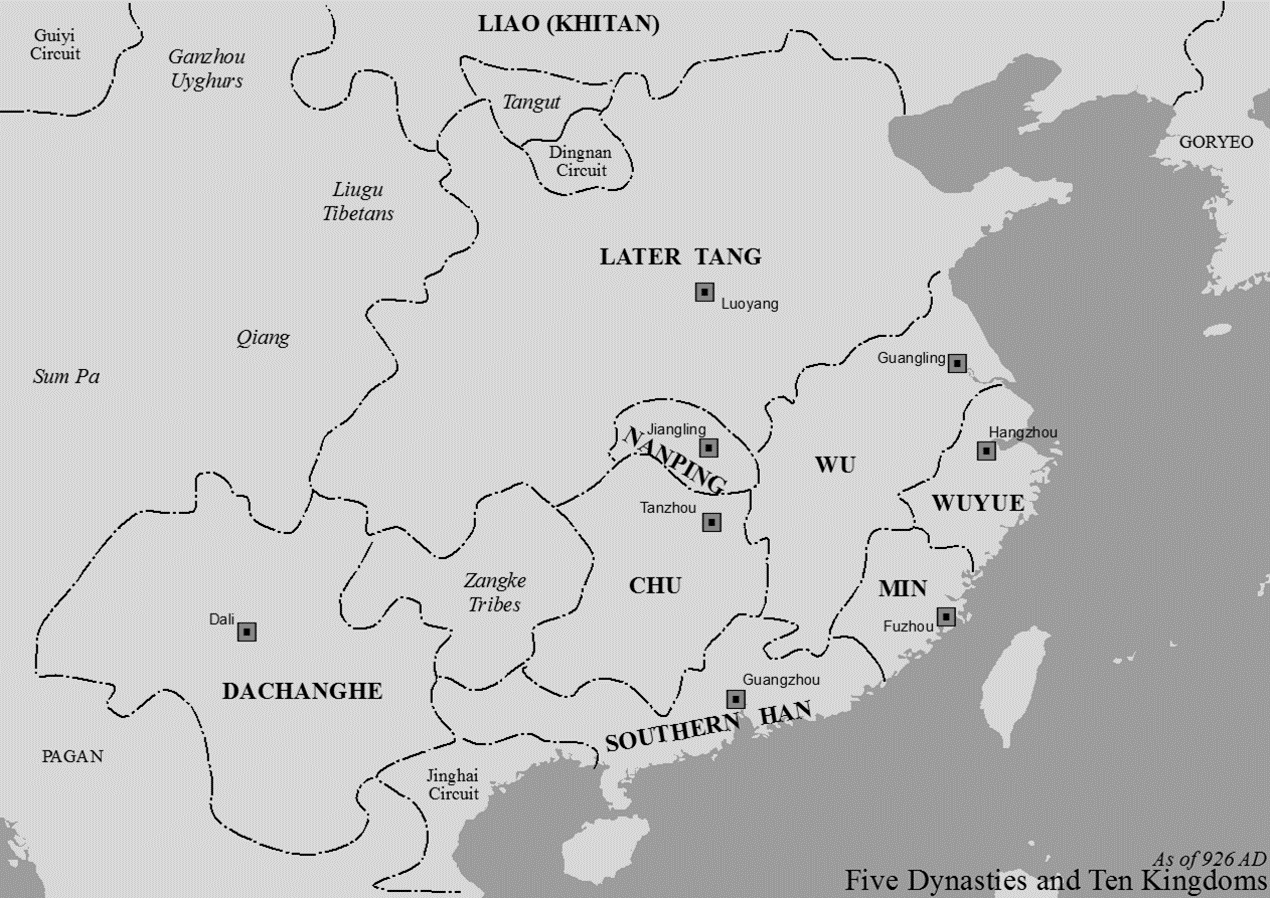
- Jingnan (Nanping) shown on map
- Capital: Jingzhou
- Common languages: Middle Chinese
- Government: Monarchy
- King
  - 909–928: Gao Jixing
  - 928–948: Gao Conghui
  - 948–960: Gao Baorong
  - 960–962: Gao Baoxu
  - 962–963: Gao Jichong
- Historical era: Five Dynasties and Ten Kingdoms period
  - Established: 924
  - Ended by the Song dynasty: 963
Preceded by	Succeeded by
Later Tang	Song dynasty
- Today part of: China

Jingnan (simplified Chinese: 荆南; traditional Chinese: 荊南; pinyin: Jīngnán), also known as Nanping (南平; alternatively written as Southern Ping) and Northern Chu (北楚) in historiography, was a dynastic state of China and one of the Ten Kingdoms during the Five Dynasties and Ten Kingdoms period. Lasting from 924 to 963, it was located in south-central China.

== Rulers ==
Sovereigns in the Five Dynasties and Ten Kingdoms period, 907–960
Temple names	Posthumous names	Personal names	Period of reigns	Era names and range
Did not exist	Prince Wuxin (武信王)	Gao Jixing (高季興)	909–928	Did not exist
Did not exist	Prince Wenxian (文獻王)	Gao Conghui (高從誨)	928–948	Did not exist
Did not exist	Prince Zhenyi (貞懿王)	Gao Baorong (高保融)	948–960	Did not exist
Did not exist	Prince Zhen'an (貞安王)	Gao Baoxu (高保勗)	960–962	Did not exist
Did not exist	Prince Deren (德仁王)	Gao Jichong (高繼沖)	962–963	Did not exist

== Rulers family tree ==
Jingnan rulers family tree

Gao Jixing 高季興 b. 858–d. 929; Wǔxìng 武信 r. 924–928
Gao Conghui 高從誨 891–948; Wénxiàn 文獻 r. 928–948
Gao Baoxu 高保勗 924–962; Zhenan 貞安王 r. 960–962	Gao Baorong 高保融 920–960; Zhenyi 貞懿王 r. 948–960
Gao Jichong 高繼沖 943–973; Deren 德仁王 r. 962–963
