= Du Hong =

Du Hong (杜洪) (died 905) was a warlord late in the Chinese dynasty Tang dynasty, who controlled Wuchang Circuit (武昌, headquartered in modern Wuhan, Hubei) from 886 to 905. In 905, he was defeated and captured by Yang Xingmi, who executed him.

== Background and seizure of Wuchang Circuit ==
It is not known when Du Hong was born, but it is known that he was from Wuchang's capital E Prefecture (鄂州) and that, in his youth, he was a performer. Late in the Qianfu era (874–879) of Emperor Xizong, when much of the realm was overrun by agrarian rebels, E's prefect Cui Shao (崔紹) organized the people into local militias to defend against attacks, so the prefectural militia became a strong fighting force. It was during this time that Du became an officer in the prefectural militia.

In 884, Cui died. The imperial official Lu Shenzhong (路審中), whom the imperial government had commissioned the prefect of Hang Prefecture (杭州, in modern Hangzhou, Zhejiang), had been refused entry by the warlord Dong Chang, who occupied the region; he therefore took up residence at Wuchang's Huang Prefecture (黃州, in modern Wuhan). Upon hearing news of Cui's death, he conscripted 3,000 soldiers and entered E Prefecture, taking it over. Thereafter, Du expelled the prefect of Yue Prefecture (岳州, in modern Yueyang, Hunan) and took it over himself, claiming the title of prefect.

In 886, the agrarian rebel Zhou Tong (周通) attacked E Prefecture. Lu abandoned E and fled. Du took the chance to enter E and claimed the title of acting military governor of Wuchang, a title that Emperor Xizong thereafter confirmed.

== Rule of Wuchang Circuit ==
It was said that while Du Hong received the commission from the imperial government, he became an ally of the warlord Zhu Quanzhong the military governor of Xuanwu Circuit (宣武, headquartered in modern Kaifeng, Henan) and cut off the tribute routes between the southeastern circuits not allied with Zhu and the imperial capital Chang'an.

In 894, Wu Tao (吳討) the prefect of Huang Prefecture submitted to a chief rival of Zhu's, Yang Xingmi the military governor of Huainan Circuit (淮南, headquartered in modern Yangzhou, Jiangsu). In response, Du attacked Wu, and Wu, while Yang sent his brother-in-law Zhu Yanshou to aid Wu, was still fearful of Du's attack, and therefore surrendered his post completely to Yang. Yang sent his officer Qu Zhang (瞿章) to take over Huang Prefecture and defend against Du.

Fearing Yang's expansion, in 896, Du, along with Qian Liu (then the military governor of Zhenhai Circuit (鎮海, headquartered at Hang Prefecture)) and Zhong Chuan the military governor of Zhennan Circuit (鎮南, headquartered in modern Nanchong, Jiangxi), all sought aid from Zhu Quanzhong. Zhu Quanzhong sent his adoptive son Zhu Yougong (朱友恭) south to try to determine what he could do, but Zhu Yougong appeared to not venture far.

In 897, under order by Emperor Xizong's brother and successor Emperor Zhaozong, Yang attacked Du, and Du sought aid from Zhu Quanzhong. Zhu Quanzhong sent Nie Jin (聶金) to raid Huainan's Si Prefecture (泗州, in modern Huai'an, Jiangsu) and sent Zhu Yougong to attack Huang Prefecture. Qu abandoned Huang and took his army and people south to Wuchang Base (武昌寨, in modern Ezhou, Hubei). Zhu Yougong subsequently captured Wuchang Base, took Qu captive, and captured Huang Prefecture. The Huainan forces that Yang sent to aid Qu were all repelled. A subsequent major attack by Zhu Quanzhong on Huainan was decisively repelled by Yang and his general Zhu Jin, however, and it was said that thereafter Zhu no longer had the strength to consider a major attack on Huainan.

In 903, Yang sent his officer Li Shenfu, with Liu Cun (劉存) as Li's deputy, to again attack Du. Li first attack E Prefecture's Yongxing County (永興, in modern Huanggang, Hubei) and captured it. He then put E Prefecture under siege, and Du sought aid from Zhu Quanzhong. Zhu sent his officer Han Qing (韓勍) with 10,000 men to Shekou (灄口, in modern Wuhan), and also sent messengers to Cheng Rui the military governor of Jingnan Circuit (荊南, headquartered in modern Jingzhou, Hubei), Ma Yin the military governor of Wu'an Circuit (武安, headquartered in modern Changsha, Hunan), and Lei Yanwei the military governor of Wuzhen Circuit (武貞, headquartered in modern Changde, Hunan), trying to persuade them to save Du. Cheng, who feared Zhu's strength and also wanted to expand his own territory, launched a fleet to try to save Du, but after he left his capital Jing Prefecture (荊州), Ma and Lei jointly attacked Jing Prefecture, capturing it and pillaging its wealth and population. Hearing the news, the morale of Cheng's soldiers failed, and Li subsequently engaged him and decisively defeated him. Cheng committed suicide by drowning, and Han withdrew, leaving Du with no aid. Du was only subsequently saved when Li was also forced to withdraw when Yang's subordinates Tian Jun the military governor of Ningguo Circuit (寧國, headquartered in modern Xuancheng, Anhui) and An Renyi (安仁義) the military prefect of Run Prefecture (潤州, in modern Zhenjiang, Jiangsu) rebelled against Yang, requiring Li to engage Tian instead.

== Defeat and death ==
In 904, with Yang Xingmi's having crushed Tian Jun's rebellion, he again sent Li Shenfu to attack Wuchang. Zhu Quanzhong, who had then seized control of Emperor Zhaozong and forcibly moved the capital and the emperor from Chang'an to Luoyang, sent messengers to Yang, seeking to intercede on Du Hong's behalf, and Yang responded, "I will do so and rebuild my relationship with you if the Son of Heaven were restored to Chang'an." Later in 904, when Li fell ill (and later died), Yang sent Liu Cun to replace Li and continued the siege. In spring 905, Zhu sent Cao Yanzuo (曹延祚) to help Du defend the city, but Liu soon captured the city and took Du and Cao captive, delivering them to Yang Xingmi at Huainan's capital Yang Prefecture (揚州). When Yang questioned Du why he did not surrender, Du responded, "I could not betray Lord Zhu." Yang then executed him and Cao. After Zhu usurped the Tang throne and established Later Liang as its emperor, he posthumously honored Du.

== Notes and references ==
- New Book of Tang, vol. 190.
- History of the Five Dynasties, vol. 17.
- Zizhi Tongjian, 255, 256, 259, 260, 261, 263, 264, 265.
