= Jiangling County =

Jiangling County 江陵县 Kiangling
- County
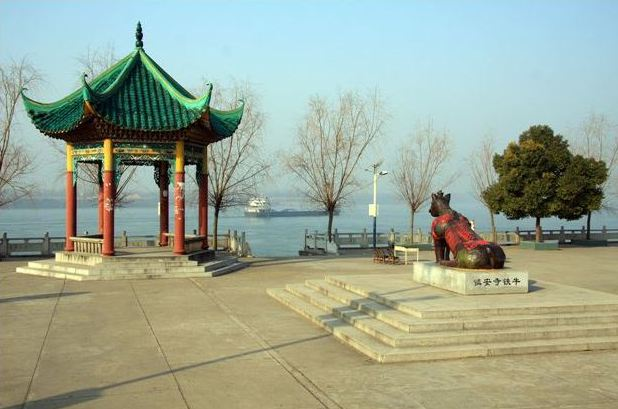
- Jiangling Tieniuji

- Location in Hubei
- Coordinates: 30°08′N 112°30′E
- Country: People's Republic of China
- Province: Hubei
- Prefecture-level city: Jingzhou

Population (2020)
  - Total: 468,276
- Website: www.jiangling.gov.cn

Jiangling (Chinese: 江陵; pinyin: Jiānglíng; Wade–Giles: Chiang-ling) is a county in southern Hubei province, People's Republic of China. Administratively, it is under the jurisdiction of Jingzhou City.

== History ==
The county name derived from the old name of Jingzhou. Liang Dynasty Prince Xiao Yi (蕭繹; 507–555) was made governor of Jingzhou, of which Jiangling was the provincial capital, at about the time that scholar and writer Yan Zhitui (531–590s) was born there. After defeating the Hou Jing Rebellion, Xiao Yi took the Liang throne, but instead of moving back to the imperial capital at Jiankang (Nanjing), he settled in Jiangling -- although his courtiers had advised otherwise. In 553, he allied with the Western Wei regime to attack his own younger brother, Xiao Ji (蕭紀; 508–553), who had used his own position as governor in Sichuan to declare himself emperor. Unfortunately for the Liang Dynasty as a whole, this enabled Western Wei to take the Shu area (Sichuan) and then turn against Xiao Yi, attacking Jiangling in 554 and conquering the city with great brutality.

In 1994, Jiangling County was dissolved and converted to two districts (Jingzhou and Jiangling) of Jingzhou City. The current Jiangling County was established in 1998, when the Jiangling District, then covering 11 outlying towns and townships, was again reverted to county status.

== Administrative divisions ==
Six towns:

- Zishi (资市镇), Xionghe (熊河镇), Baimasi (白马寺镇), Shagang (沙岗镇), Puji (普济镇), Haoxue (郝穴镇)

Two townships:

- Majiazhai Township (马家寨乡), Qinshi Township (秦市乡)

Three other areas:

- Jiangbei (江北监狱), Sanhu (三湖农场), Lu/Liuheyuan (六合垸农场)
