= 900s (decade) =

Decade

The 900s decade ran from January 1, 900, to December 31, 909.

== Events ==
=== 900 ===
==== By place ====
====== Abbasid Caliphate ======
- Spring – Forces under the Transoxianian emir Isma'il ibn Ahmad are victorious at Balkh (Northern Afghanistan) over Amr ibn al-Layth; the latter is captured and sent to Caliph Al-Mu'tadid in Baghdad. The Samanid Dynasty rules over Khorasan, as well as Transoxiana. A few months later, the Samanids conquer the Zaydid emirate of Tabaristan. This victory marks the beginning of the dispersion of the local Shi'ites by the new Sunni power.
- Arab–Byzantine wars: Emperor Leo VI ("the Wise") begins an offensive against the Abbasid army in Cilicia, Upper Mesopotamia and Armenia. He also continues the war against the Muslims in Sicily and southern Italy.
- The future founder of the Fatimid Caliphate, Abdallah al-Mahdi and his family migrate to North Africa. They claim to be descendants of Fatimah, the daughter of the Islamic prophet Muhammad.
- The Qarmatians of al-Bahrayn, under Abu Sa'id al-Jannabi, score a major victory over the Abbasid army led by al-Abbas ibn Amr al-Ghanawi.

====== Europe ======
- Spring – Atenulf I, Lombard prince of Capua, conquers the Duchy of Benevento. He deposes Duke Radelchis II and unites the two southern Lombard duchies in Mezzogiorno (Southern Italy). The Byzantines offer a strategic alliance to Atenulf who directs a campaign against the Saracens. They have establish themselves on the banks of the Garigliano River. From here, Arab warbands launch frequent raids in Campania.
- February 4 – The 7-year-old Louis IV ("the Child") is proclaimed king of the East Frankish Kingdom at an assembly at Forchheim (Bavaria). Because of his young age, the reins of government are entirely in the hands of others – the Frankish nobles and bishops. The most influential of Louis' councillors are Hatto I, archbishop of Mainz, and Solomon III, bishop of Constance.
- June 8 – Edward the Elder (son of Alfred the Great) is crowned king of England at Kingston upon Thames.
- June 17 – Baldwin II, Count of Flanders has Fulk the Venerable, bishop of Reims, assassinated.
- June 29 – The Venetians repel the Magyar raiders at Rialto.
- Summer – After the death of his wife Zoe Zaoutzaina, the Byzantine emperor Leo VI marries Eudokia Baïana.
- August – Abdallah, son of the Aghlabid emir Ibrahim II, represses a revolt of his Muslim subjects, and then initiates a campaign against the last Byzantine strongholds in Sicily.
- August 13 – Zwentibold, king of Lotharingia, is killed in battle on the Meuse River, while fighting against his rebellious subjects; subsequently they recognize Louis IV as their rightful suzerain - Lotharingia is then converted from a kingdom to a duchy.
- October 12 – Following Magyars raids in Lombardy, king Louis III ("the Blind") is called to Italy by the grandees. He takes Pavia, forcing king Berengar I to flee, and replaces him as King of Italy.
- King Donald II is killed after an 11-year reign. He is succeeded by his cousin Constantine II as king of Scotland; he will reign for more than 40 years.
- Docibilis I of Gaeta and his Saracen mercenaries attack Capua, in vain.
- After the rejection of their alliance proposal by the Bavarians, the Hungarians attack this country, occupying Pannonia and parts of Ostmark, which become part of the Hungarian state.

====== Asia ======
- April 21 – Namwaran and his children, Lady Angkatan and Bukah, are granted pardon by the Lakan (ruler) of Tondo, as represented by Jayadewa, Lord Minister of Pila, which released them of all their debts as inscribed in the Laguna Copperplate Inscription (Philippines).
- Maravarman Rajasimha II, king of Pandya, begins to rule. He is constantly at war with Chola (his overlord) and becomes the last ruler of the first Pandyan Empire (India).
- December 1 – Emperor Zhao Zong is deposed and forced by a group of Tang eunuchs led by Liu Jishu to abdicate the throne to his son, Crown Prince Li Yu (until 901).

====== Mesoamerica ======
- The Postclassic Period: The Maya civilization that has flourished for about 650 years in upland areas of what later will be called Central America comes to an end as a result either of depleted agricultural resources or warfare between some 40 rival city-states. The great stone pyramids, ball courts and other structures at cities such as Tikal, Copán, and Palenque are abandoned and overgrown with jungle, as will eventually be the sculpture and relief carvings of the Maya, who have developed a calendar based on almost perfect astronomic measurements. Cities such as Chichen Itza, Mayapan and Uxmal in the highlands of the Yucatán Peninsula will continue to flourish.
- In Peru the Lambayeque people establish themselves over areas previously developed by the Moche (approximate date).

==== By topic ====
====== Art ======
- c. 900 –1230 – Pueblo Bonito, Chaco Canyon, New Mexico, is built by the Ancestral Pueblo people.

====== Religion ======
- January – Pope John IX dies after a two year reign. He is succeeded by Benedict IV as the 117th pope of the Catholic Church.

====== Commerce ======
- The east coast of Africa is impacted by trade and Arab, Persian and Indian traders mix with the indigenous Bantu. Many of the coastal Bantu adopt Islam, reaching as far south as Sofala (Mozambique).

====== Exploration ======
- Greenland is discovered by the Norseman Gunnbjörn Ulfsson, sailing from Norway to Iceland: he is blown off course by a storm and comes in sight of some islands off the coast (approximate date).

====== Medicine ======
- The Persian scientist Muhammad ibn Zakariya al-Razi distinguishes smallpox from measles in the course of his writings. Holding against any sort of orthodoxy, particularly Aristotle's physics, he maintains the conception of an 'absolute' time, regarded by him as "a never-ending flow".

=== 901 ===
==== By place ====
====== Europe ======
- February – King Louis III (the Blind) is crowned as Holy Roman Emperor by Pope Benedict IV at Rome. His rival Berengar I seeks refuge in Bavaria at the court of King Louis IV (the Child).
- March – Abu Abbas Abdallah resumes his Aghlabid campaign against the Byzantine enclaves of Sicily. He dispatches his fleet towards Messina, while bombarding the town walls of Damona.
- June 10 – Abu Abbas Abdallah crosses the Strait of Messina and proceeds to Reggio Calabria. Appearing before its walls, the Byzantine garrison flees, surrendering the city to the Aghlabids.
- Summer – Abu Abbas Abdallah defeats a relief Byzantine navy dispatched from Constantinople at Messina. He dismantles the fortifications of Messina and transfers his booty to Palermo.
- July 10 – Battle of Zamora: In Al-Andalus, Ibn al-Qitt and Abū Naṣr ‘Abd Allāh ibn ‘Alī al-Sarrāj call for a small jihad, but are defeated by King Alfonso III.

====== Britain ======
- Fall – Æthelwold (a son of Æthelred I) rebels against his cousin, King Edward the Elder. He comes with a fleet to Essex, and encourages the Danish Vikings of East Anglia to rise up.
- Edward the Elder takes the title "King of the Anglo-Saxons". His mother, Dowager-Queen Ealhswith, founds the Nunnaminster at Winchester and retires into a religious life there.
- The first written mention is made of Shrewsbury (West Midlands).

====== Arabian Empire ======
- February 18 – Thābit ibn Qurra dies at Baghdad, having served as court astronomer to the Abbasid Caliph Al-Mutadid. He has spent his life translating and teaching the works of Greek mathematicians, and of his own.
- Abu 'Abdullah al-Shi'i leads the rebellion of the Kutama Berbers (a movement of the Shiʿite Fatimids), against the Aghlabid emirate in Ifriqiya (modern Tunisia).

====== Asia ======
- January 24 – Emperor Zhao Zong of the Tang Dynasty (after he is briefly deposed by general Liu Jishu) is restored to the Chinese throne. Liu, with four eunuch family members are killed.
- January 25 – Sugawara no Michizane, a Japanese poet, is demoted from his aristocratic rank and is exiled to a minor official post at Dazaifu (Chikuzen Province).
- The Kingdom of Hu Goguryeo is established by the rebel leader Gung Ye. He subjugates the local lords in the Korean Peninsula and proclaims himself king.
- In China, Fuzhou City (Fujian Province) is expanded, with the construction of a new city wall ("Luo City").
- Abaoji is elected chieftain of the Yila tribe and becomes commander of all Khitan military forces.

====== Mesoamerica ======
- The Mesoamerican ballgame court is dedicated by the Maya ruler Chan Chak K'ak'nal Ajaw (also known as Lord Chac) at Uxmal (modern Mexico).
- The Toltecs establish themselves at Tula. The city becomes the capital and rises to prominence after the fall of Teotihuacan (approximate date).

==== By topic ====
====== Religion ======
- January – Arethas of Caesarea speaks on the occasion of the Epiphany. He becomes the official rhetor at the Byzantine court of Emperor Leo VI (the Wise) at Constantinople, and is nominated as Archbishop of Caesarea in Cappadocia.
- March 1 – Nicholas Mystikos, a layman close to Photios, becomes Patriarch of Constantinople.

=== 902 ===
==== By place ====
====== Europe ======
- Spring – Adalbert II, margrave of Tuscany, revolts against Emperor Louis III ("the Blind"). He helps the deposed King Berengar I to recover the Kingdom of Italy. Louis III is forced to abdicate the Lombard throne and flees to Provence, compelled to promise never to return to Italy.
- February – March – Abu Abbas Abdallah, conqueror of Reggio Calabria, returns from Sicily and succeeds his father Ibrahim II as Aghlabid emir of Ifriqiya.
- June – Ibrahim II lands with an Aghlabid expeditionary force in Trapani, and proceeds to Palermo. He crushes the reinforced Byzantine army at Giardini.
- August 1 – Taormina, the last Byzantine stronghold in Sicily, is captured by the Aghlabid army. After nearly 75 years, all of Sicily is in Aghlabid hands.
- September – Ibrahim II crosses the Strait of Messina into Calabria. He begins his march to conquer the rest of Italy, and lays siege at Cosenza.
- October 23 – Ibrahim II dies of dysentery in a chapel near Cosenza. His grandson, Ziyadat Allah, takes over the army, but lifts the siege.
- Winter – The Balearic Islands are conquered by the Emirate of Córdoba. The Moors improve agriculture with irrigation on the islands.

====== Britain And Ireland ======
- December 13 – Battle of the Holme: The Anglo-Saxon army is defeated by the Danish Vikings under Æthelwold (a son of Æthelred I) at Holme. Æthelwold is killed, ending his revolt against King Edward the Elder.
- Winter – The Norsemen are expelled from Dublin. After a brief foray into Seisyllwg (Wales), a group, under the Viking lord Ingimundr, settle in the Wirral with the agreement of Lady Æthelflæd of the Mercians.

====== Arabian Empire ======
- April 5 – Caliph Al-Mu'tadid dies in Baghdad after a 10-year reign. Possibly poisoned in a palace intrigue, he is succeeded by his eldest son Al-Muktafi as ruler of the Abbasid Caliphate.
- The Kutama tribe under Abu Abdallah al-Shi'i revolt against the Aghlabids. He begins a campaign and dispatches an invitation to the Fatimid spiritual leader Ubayd Allah al-Mahdi Billah to support him.
- Moorish Andalusian merchants set up a trade settlement (so-called emporium) in Oran (modern Algeria).

====== Asia ======
- Spring – Emperor Zhao Zong appoints Yang Xingmi as the overall commander of the Eastern circuits in China. He receives the title of Prince Wuzhong of Wu.
- The Kingdom of Nanzhao in East Asia is overthrown, followed by three dynasties in quick succession, before the establishment of the Kingdom of Dali in 937.

=== 903 ===
==== By place ====
====== Europe ======
- King Berengar I of Italy proceeds to issue concessions and privileges to the Lombard nobility and monasteries. He grants concessions to Bobbio Abbey in Emilia-Romagna (Northeast Italy).
- King Louis IV ("the Child") promulgates the Raffelstetten customs regulations, a legal document for a toll-bridge on the Danube River in Asten (modern Austria).

====== Britain ======
- The Danish Vikings invade Anglesey after being driven out of Dublin (see 902). They fail to gain a foothold in Wales, and sail on to Chester.
- A party of Danes under the Viking warlord Ingimundr attack the Welsh in a pitched battle at Maes Ros Meilon, perhaps near Llanfaes.

====== Arabian Empire ======
- November 29 – Battle of Hama: Abbasid forces under Muhammad ibn Sulayman al-Katib defeat the Qarmatians near Hama, on the banks of the Orontes River (modern Syria). The Qarmatian army is scattered and pursued by Abbasid troops; Al-Husayn ibn Zikrawayh and other Qarmatian leaders are captured.

==== By topic ====
====== Religion ======
- July – Pope Benedict IV dies after a 3-year reign. He is succeeded by Leo V as the 118th pope of the Catholic Church. Leo is imprisoned and tortured by Antipope Christopher after a reign of just 1 month. Christopher makes himself the new pope of Rome.

=== 904 ===
==== By place ====
====== Byzantine Empire ======
- July 29 – Sack of Thessalonica: A Muslim fleet, led by the Greek renegade Leo of Tripoli, appears outside Thessalonica and begins its attack after a short and silent inspection of the fortification of the city. After attacks from the sea for two days, the Saracens are able to storm the city walls, overcome the Thessalonians' resistance and capture the city. The sacking continues for a full week, before the raiders depart for their base in the Levant. Having freed 4,000 Muslim prisoners and captured 60 ships, gaining a large loot, they carry off 22,000 men and women as slaves.
- Arab–Byzantine War: The Byzantines under Andronikos Doukas, along with Eustathios Argyros, campaign against the Abbasids and defeat the Muslim garrisons of Mopsuestia and Tarsus, near Marash (modern Turkey).
- Emperor Leo VI (the Wise) is forced to sign a peace treaty with Simeon I, ruler (knyaz) of the Bulgarian Empire. All Slavic-inhabited lands of Macedonia and southern Albania are ceded to the Bulgarians.

====== Europe ======
- Summer – King Louis IV (the Child) invites Kurszán, a Hungarian leader (gyula) of the Magyar tribal confederation, and his entourage to negotiate at the Fischa River, but they are killed in an ambush.
- In Portugal, for the third time in less than 30 years, the Christians take control of Coimbra, this time for almost a century.
- Beginning of the Saeculum obscurum ('Dark Age'), a period of 60 years in which the papacy was heavily influenced by the powerful Theophylacti family, the counts of Tusculum.

====== Britain ======
- Prince Hywel ap Cadell of Seisyllwg (Wales) marries Princess Elen of Dyfed. The latter's father, King Llywarch ap Hyfaidd, dies. The throne of Dyfed is claimed by Llywarch's brother, Rhodri ap Hyfaidd, but he is probably forced to flee from Hywel's armies.

====== Arabian Empire ======
- Winter – Shayban ibn Ahmad ibn Tulun succeeds his nephew Harun ibn Khumarawayh as emir of the Tulunid dynasty, who is killed in a mutiny during the invasion of Egypt by the Abbasid Caliphate.

====== China ======
- September 22 – The warlord Zhu Quanzhong kills Emperor Zhao Zong, along with his family and many ministers, after seizing control of the imperial government. Zhu places Zhao Zong's 13-year-old son Ai (Li Zhou) on the imperial throne as a puppet ruler of the Tang dynasty.
- Zhu Quanzhong has Chang'an, the capital of the Tang dynasty and the largest city in the ancient world, destroyed, and moves the materials to Luoyang, which becomes the new capital.

==== By topic ====
====== Religion ======
- January 29 – Pope Sergius III succeeds Leo V and the deposed Antipope Christopher (both of whom are murdered or exiled) as the 119th pope of the Catholic Church. The ascension of Sergius marks the beginning of the Pornocracy ('rule of the whores'), which will last for 150 years. During this time, the clergy will be sidelined and rule over Rome is dominated by the Roman nobility.
- Sergius III allies himself with Theophylact I, count of Tusculum, who becomes ruler of Rome and the papal administration. Sergius rewards him (for his support and rise of power) with the position of sacri palatii vestararius and essentially becomes his puppet.

=== 905 ===
==== By place ====
====== Europe ======
- Spring – King Berengar I of Italy arranges a truce with the Hungarians, on payment of a tribute. Grand Prince Árpád withdraws from Italy, and begins raiding in Bavaria.
- Louis III, Holy Roman Emperor, launches another attempt to invade Italy. A Frankish expeditionary force, led by Adalbert I of Ivrea, captures Pavia, and Berengar I retires to Verona.
- July 21 – Berengar I and a hired Hungarian army defeat the Frankish force at Verona. They take Louis III as prisoner and Berengar blinds him for breaking his oath.
- Louis III returns to Provence. Unable to govern properly, he relinquishes the government of Lower Burgundy to his cousin Hugh, Count of Arles.
- Sancho I succeeds Fortún I as King of Pamplona, and creates a Basque kingdom centered in Navarre (modern-day Spain).

====== Britain ======
- Cadell ap Rhodri, king of Seisyllwg (Wales), makes his 25-year-old son Hywel ap Cadell ruler of Dyfed, having conquered that territory. Rhodri ap Hyfaidd, nominally king of Dyfed, is caught and executed, at Arwystli.
- Norse settlers under the Viking warlord Ingimundr, revolt against the Mercians and try to capture the city of Chester. They are beaten off.

====== Arabian Empire ======
- Summer – Caliph Al-Muktafi sends an Abbasid army (10,000 men) led by Muhammad ibn Sulayman to re-establish control over Syria and Egypt. The campaign is supported from the sea by a fleet from the frontier districts of Cilicia under Damian of Tarsus. He leads his ships up the Nile River, raids the coast, and intercepts the supplies for the Tulunids.
- Ahmad ibn Kayghalagh, an Abbasid military officer, is appointed governor of the provinces of Damascus and Jordan. He is sent to confront a pro-Tulunid rebellion under Muhammad ibn Ali al-Khalanji. The latter manages to capture Fustat and proclaims the restoration of the Tulunids, while the local Abbasid commander withdraws to Alexandria.

====== Asia ======
- China loses control over Annam (Northern Vietnam). The village notable Khuc Thua Du leads a rebellion against the Tang Dynasty. The Chinese garrison at Tong Binh (modern Hanoi) is destroyed. Khuc Thua Du declares Annam autonomous.
- Abaoji, a Khitan tribal leader, leads 70,000 cavalry into Shanxi (Northern China) to create a 'brotherhood' with Li Keyong, a Shatuo governor (jiedushi) of the Tang Dynasty.
- Emperor Daigo of Japan orders the selection of four court poets, led by Ki no Tsurayuki, to compile the Kokin Wakashū, an early anthology of Waka poetry.

==== By topic ====
====== Religion ======
- Naum of Preslav, a Bulgarian missionary, founds a monastery on the shores of Lake Ohrid (modern-day North Macedonia), which later receives his name.

=== 906 ===
==== By place ====
====== Europe ======
- February 27 – Battle of Fritzlar: The Conradines defeat the Babenberg counts, to establish themselves as dukes of Franconia (modern-day Bavaria). Count Conrad the Elder is killed in the battle; his son Conrad the Younger becomes duke of Franconia.
- Summer – Duke Mojmir II halts the advance of the plundering Hungarians under Grand Prince Árpád in Great Moravia (approximate date).

====== Britain ======
- King Constantine II of Scotland calls for an assembly to meet at Scone. Scottish Christian clergy under Bishop Cellach pledges that the laws and disciplines of the faith, and the laws of churches and gospels, should be kept pariter cum Scottis.

====== Arabian Empire ======
- October 22 – Abbasid commander Ahmad ibn Kayghalagh leads a raid against the Byzantine Empire from Tarsus, joined by the governor Rustam ibn Baradu. He reaches the Halys River and takes 4,000–5,000 captives.

====== Asia ======
- January 22 – The warlord Zhu Quanzhong secretly puts Empress Dowager He, the wife of the late Emperor Zhaozong and mother of the reigning Emperor Ai, to death (by strangulation) and has her defamed and posthumously demoted to commoner rank.

====== Armenia ======
- 906 K'argop' earthquake: It takes place in the monastery K'argop', Armenia. The monastery is also known as Xotakerk', the monastery of the Vegetarians. The earthquake occurs approximately 150 years following the 735 Vayots Dzor Province earthquake, and affects the same region.

=== 907 ===
==== By place ====
====== Byzantine Empire ======
- Rus'–Byzantine War: Varangian prince Oleg of Novgorod leads the Kievan Rus' in a campaign against Constantinople, concluded by the Rus'–Byzantine Treaty (in which the city of Chernihiv in Ukraine is first mentioned). He lays siege to the Byzantine capital with some 2,000 ships (dugout boats), and secures trading rights from the world's leading center of commerce.

====== Europe ======
- July 4–6 – Battle of Pressburg: At "Brezalauspurc" (probably modern-day Bratislava in Slovakia), the advancing East Frankish army (60,000 men) is annihilated by the Hungarians led by Grand Prince Árpád. Duke Luitpold and Archbishop Dietmar I are killed, together with 19 dukes, 2 bishops and 3 abbots. The East Frankish Kingdom loses control of the March of Pannonia.
- Summer – The Hungarians invade Bavaria, causing great destruction, occupying many towns and, on their way home, defeating a Bavarian army at Lengenfeld. The Hungarian-Bavarian border is fixed on the Enns River.

====== Britain ======
- Lady Æthelflæd of Mercia refortifies Chester against Viking attacks. King Edward the Elder founds Romsey Abbey (Hampshire).

====== Arabian Empire ======
- Emir Isma'il ibn Ahmad dies after a 15-year reign in which he has extended his borders to Tabaristan and Khorasan. He establishes independence throughout the eastern part of his empire from his capital at Bukhara. Isma'il is succeeded by his son Ahmad Samani as ruler of the Samanid Empire.

====== China ======
- The Five Dynasties and Ten Kingdoms period begins in China.
  - February 27 – Abaoji, ruler (khagan) of the confederation of Khitans, proclaims himself emperor and establishes the Liao dynasty, killing most of the other Khitan chieftains. He occupies territories along China's northern border including parts of Hebei and Shanxi provinces.
  - May 12
    - The short-lived Qi Kingdom is founded by the warlord Li Maozhen (Prince of Qi). His power is centered in Shaanxi province, in Northwest China. The Tang dynasty comes to an end after 289 years as Emperor Ai is forced to abdicate by chancellor Zhu Quanzhong.
    - The short-lived Wu Kingdom is founded by Yang Wo (Prince of Hongnong) in Jiangdu (South Central China). He refuses to acknowledge the rule of Zhu Quanzhong.
  - June 1 – Zhu Quanzhong (Zhu Wen) usurps the throne and proclaims himself the first emperor of Later Liang. China is controlled by successive short-lived kingdoms (until 960).
  - June 8 – The Chu Kingdom is founded by the warlord Ma Yin (Prince of Chu) in Changsha. Present-day Hunan and Guangxi provinces (Southern China) are under his control.
  - November 3 – The Former Shu Kingdom is founded by the warlord Wang Jian (Prince of Shu) in Chengdu. His power is centered in Sichuan province, in Southwest China.
  - December 1 – The Wuyue Kingdom is founded by the warlord Qian Liu in Hangzhou. His proclaims himself king, his power is centered in Jiangsu province (Eastern China).

==== By topic ====
====== Religion ======
- February 1 – Nicholas I Mystikos is deposed as Patriarch of Constanstinople, (having fallen out with the Byzantine Emperor Leo VI), and is replaced by Euthymius I Syncellus.

=== 908 ===
==== By place ====
====== Byzantine Empire ======
- May 15 – The three-year-old Constantine VII, the son of Emperor Leo VI (the Wise), is crowned as co-emperor of the Byzantine Empire by Patriarch Euthymius I at Constantinople. The ceremony is held in the Hagia Sophia. After the rituals, Constantine is crowned (symbolically) and becomes Leo's successor.

====== Europe ======
- August 3 – Battle of Eisenach: An invading Hungarian force defeats the East Frankish army under Duke Burchard, killing him, together with Duke Egino and Rudolf I, bishop of Würzburg. The Hungarians devastate Thuringia and Saxony as far north as Bremen, returning home with many spoils.
- Duke Atenulf I (the Great) of Benevento attacks the Saracens at the Garigliano River, with the assistance of Naples and Amalfi. Crossing the river, Atenulf defeats an Arab army and reaches the walls of their fortified camp. However, the sudden withdrawal of the Neapolitans renders the siege useless.

====== Ireland ======
- September 13 – Battle of Belach Mugna: In an alliance with the kings Cerball mac Muirecáin of Leinster, Cathal mac Conchobair of Connacht, and Cellach mac Cerbaill of Osraige, High King Flann Sinna defeats the forces of King Cormac mac Cuilennáin of Munster near Castledermot (County Kildare).

====== Arabian Empire ======
- August 13 – Abbasid caliph al-Muktafi died and he was succeeded by his nominated heir, his younger brother Jafar (Al-Muqtadir).

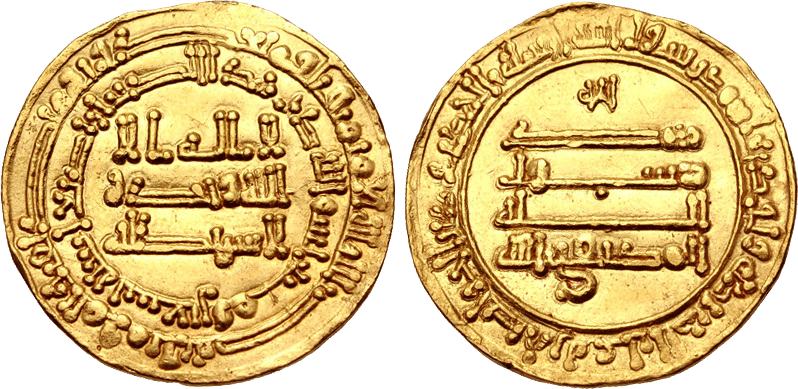
Gold dinar of Al-Muqtafi, Abbasid caliph

- December 17 – Husayn ibn Hamdan leads a revolt to depose the newly-appointed Abbasid Caliph Al-Muqtadir in Baghdad. He installs his uncle Abdallah ibn al-Mu'tazz and kills vizier Al-Abbas ibn al-Hasan al-Jarjara'i, but fails to murder Al-Muqtadir. This leads, finally, to the coup's collapse.
- Winter – Snow falls in Baghdad. According to Arabic writings, even rivers are frozen.

====== China ======
- March 26 – Emperor Taizu (Zhu Wen) of Later Liang has the 15-year-old Li Zhu, the last Tang Dynasty emperor, poisoned. Li Zhu receives the posthumous name of Ai ("lamentable").
- May 1 – Emperor Wang Jian of Former Shu puts his adoptive son (and a potential successor) Wang Zongji (Prince of Shu) to death. He orders Wang Zongji's associates to be exiled.
- June 9 – The generals Zhang Hao and Xu Wen assassinate Yang Wo (Prince of Hongnong). He is succeeded by his 11-year-old brother Yang Longyan as ruler of the Wu Kingdom.
- June 18 – Xu Wen murders Zhang Hao and takes over as Yang Longyan's regent, and sole commander of the imperial guard. He becomes de facto ruler of the Wu Kingdom.

=== 909 ===
==== By place ====
====== Britain ======
- King Edward the Elder and his sister, Princess Æthelflæd of Mercia, raid Danish East Anglia and bring back the relics of St. Oswald in triumph. Æthelflæd translates them to the new minster in Gloucester, which is renamed St. Oswald's Priory in his honour.
- Edward the Elder despatches an Anglo-Saxon army to attack the Northumbrian Vikings, and ravages Scandinavian York.

====== Africa ======
- March 18 – The Fatimid Dynasty founded by Shiite Muslims in Ifriqiya (modern Tunisia) gains suzerainty over the Aghlabid Dynasty in North Africa. Emir Ziyadat Allah III escapes to the Near East, unable to secure any help from the Abbasid Caliphate to regain his emirate.
- The Berber Kutama tribesmen under Abdullah al-Mahdi Billah capture the cities of Kairouan and Raqqada. The capital city of the Rustamid imamate, Tihert is destroyed. The remaining Ibadi are forced into the desert.
- Winter – Abdullah al-Mahdi Billah takes up the leadership of the Fatimid state and proclaims himself Caliph Abdullah (al-Mahdi).

====== China ======
- April 27 – The Min Kingdom (modern-day Fujian province) is established by governor Wang Shenzhi (Prince of Langye), with Fuzhou (known as Changle) as its capital. Wang Shenzhi tries to attract scholars who will help to construct an efficient bureaucracy and tax system.
- Battle of Jisu - the warlord brothers Liu Shouguang and Liu Shouwen fight with Liu Shouguang emerging victorious

====== Mesoamerica ======
- The last Long Count date is inscribed on a monument at the Mayan site of Toniná (modern-day Chiapas, Mexico), marking the end of the Classic Maya Period.

==== By topic ====
====== Religion ======
- Asser, bishop of Sherborne, dies. His See is divided, there are new Bishoprics created at Wells, Crediton, Ramsbury and Sonning.

== Significant people ==
- Al-Mu'tadid
- Ali al-Muktafi
- Al-Muqtadir
- Leo VI of Byzantium
- Badr al-Mu'tadidi military leader
- Abdallah ibn al-Mu'tazz

== Births ==
900

- Abū Ja'far al-Khāzin, Persian astronomer (d. 971)
- Adaldag, archbishop of Bremen (approximate date)
- Berengar II, king of Italy (approximate date)
- Berthold, duke of Bavaria (approximate date)
- Conrad, bishop of Constance (approximate date)
- Fujiwara no Saneyori, Japanese statesman (d. 970)
- Gero, archbishop of Cologne (approximate date)
- Gero, Frankish nobleman (approximate date)
- John of Gorze, Frankish abbot and diplomat (d. 974)
- Mord Fiddle, Icelandic farmer and law expert (d. 968)
- Nicodemus of Mammola, Italian monk (d. 990)
- Ramiro II, king of León (approximate date)
- Ramwold, Frankish abbot (approximate date)
- Rasso, Frankish military leader (approximate date)
- Yang Pu, emperor of Wu (d. 939)

901

- Biagota, probable wife of duke Boleslaus I of Bohemia

902

- November 25 – Tai Zong, emperor of the Liao dynasty (d. 947)
- Ælfweard, king of Wessex (approximate date)
- Du, empress of the Song dynasty (approximate date)
- Eadgifu, queen and wife of Charles the Simple
- Han Xizai, Chinese official and calligrapher (d. 970)
- Lady Xu Xinyue, wife of Qian Yuanguan (d. 946)
- Lothar I, Frankish nobleman (d. 929)
- Wang Jun, chancellor of Later Zhou (or 903)

903

- December 7 – Abd al-Rahman al-Sufi, Persian astronomer (d. 986)
- Feng Yanji, chancellor of Southern Tang (d. 960)
- Kūya, Japanese priest of Pure Land Buddhism (d. 972)
- Li Gu, chancellor of Later Zhou (d. 960)
- Wang Jun, chancellor of Later Zhou (or 902)

904

- September 10 – Guo Wei, emperor of Later Zhou (d. 954)
- Æthelwold, bishop of Winchester (or 909)
- Egill Skallagrímsson, Viking warrior and poet (approximate date)
- Yongming Yanshou, Chinese Zen master (d. 975)

905

- Abu al-Misk Kafur, Muslim vizier (d. 968)
- Al-Mustakfi, Abbasid caliph (d. 949)
- Constantine VII, Byzantine emperor (d. 959)
- Fulk II, Frankish nobleman (approximate date)
- Godfrey, Frankish nobleman (approximate date)

906

- June 21 – Abu Ja'far Ahmad ibn Muhammad, Saffarid emir (d. 963)
- Abu Tahir al-Jannabi, Qarmatian ruler (d. 944)
- Fujiwara no Atsutada, Japanese nobleman (d. 943)
- Guan Tong, Chinese landscape painter (approximate date)
- Liu Congxiao, Chinese general (d. 962)
- Majolus of Cluny, Frankish abbot (approximate date)
- Nasr II, Samanid emir (d. 943)
- Sherira Gaon, Jewish spiritual leader (d. 1006)

907

- November 26 – Rudesind, Galician bishop (d. 977)
- Bertha of Swabia, Frankish queen (approximate date)
- Robert of Vermandois, Frankish nobleman (approximate date)
- Wenceslaus I, duke of Bohemia (approximate date) (k. 935)

908

- Al-Muttaqi, Abbasid caliph (d. 968)
- Guo Chong, Chinese general (approximate date)
- Ibrahim ibn Sinan, Abbasid mathematician (d. 946)
- Kiyohara no Motosuke, Japanese nobleman (d. 990)
- Thankmar, Frankish prince (approximate date)

909

- Æthelwold, bishop of Winchester (or 904)
- December – Ar-Radi, Abbasid caliph (d. 940)
- Dunstan, archbishop of Canterbury (d. 988)
- Fujiwara no Morosuke, Japanese statesman (d. 960)
- Shen Lun, Chinese scholar-official (d. 987)
- Thomais of Lesbos, Byzantine saint (d. ca. 947)

== Deaths ==
900

- June 17 – Fulk, archbishop of Reims
- July 8 – Qatr al-Nada, wife of the Abbasid caliph al-Mu'tadid
- August 13 – Zwentibold, king of Lotharingia (b. 870)
- Donald II, king of the Picts (Scotland)
- Dongshan Shouchu, Chinese Zen teacher
- Eardulf, bishop of Lindisfarne (approximate date)
- Fujiwara no Takafuji, Japanese nobleman (b. 838)
- Ibn Abi Asim, Muslim Sunni scholar (b. 822)
- John IX, pope of the Catholic Church
- Lde-dpal-hkhor-btsan, Indian ruler
- Litan, Irish abbot (approximate date)
- Liu Chongwang, chancellor of the Tang Dynasty
- Li Zhirou, chancellor of the Tang Dynasty
- Merfyn ap Rhodri, king of Powys (approximate date)
- Muhammad ibn Zayd, emir of Tabaristan (Iran)
- Ono no Komachi, Japanese poet (approximate date)
- Tadg mac Conchobair, king of Connacht (Ireland)
- Wang Tuan, chancellor of the Tang Dynasty
- Wulfhere, archbishop of York (approximate date)

901

- January 24 – Liu Jishu, general of the Tang Dynasty
- February 12 – Antony II, patriarch of Constantinople
- February 18 – Thābit ibn Qurra, Syrian astronomer and physician (b. 826)
- April 12 – Eudokia Baïana, Byzantine empress and wife of Leo VI
- July 8 – Grimbald, Frankish Benedictine monk (b. 820)
- November 10 – Adelaide, queen of the West Frankish Kingdom
- Guaimar I of Salerno, Lombard prince
- Lady Shuiqiu, wife of Qian Kuan
- Lei Man, warlord of the Tang Dynasty
- Muhammad ibn Abi'l-Saj, Abbasid general
- Ubayd Allah ibn Sulayman, Abbasid vizier
- Wu Renbi, Chinese Taoist and writer
- Xu Yanruo, chancellor of the Tang Dynasty

902

- February 16 – Mary the Younger, Byzantine saint (b. 875)
- April 5 – Al-Mu'tadid, Abbasid caliph
- August 14 – Badr al-Mu'tadidi, Abbasid commander-in-chief
- October 23 – Ibrahim II, Aghlabid emir (b. 850)
- December 5 – Ealhswith, queen and wife of Alfred the Great
- December 16 – Wei Yifan, chancellor of the Tang dynasty
- Æthelwold, son of Æthelred of Wessex
- Amr ibn al-Layth, Saffarid emir
- Anscar I, margrave of Ivrea (Italy)
- Li Cunxin, general of the Tang dynasty (b. 862)
- Wang Zongdi, Chinese official and governor
- Yunju Daoying, Chinese Buddhist teacher (b. 830)

903

- March 6
  - Lu Guangqi, Chinese official and chancellor
  - Su Jian, Chinese official and chancellor
- March 26 – Sugawara no Michizane, Japanese politician and poet (b. 845)
- June 10 – Cheng Rui, Chinese warlord
- July 27– Abdallah II of Ifriqiya, Aghlabid emir
- July – Benedict IV, pope of the Catholic Church
- December 24 – Hedwiga, duchess of Saxony
- December 30 – Tian Jun, Chinese warlord (b. 858)
- Adalhard of Babenberg, Frankish nobleman
- Moses Bar-Kepha, Syriac bishop and writer
- Théodrate of Troyes, Frankish queen (b. 868)
- Zhu Yanshou, Chinese governor (b. 870)

904

- September 22 – Zhao Zong, emperor of the Tang dynasty (b. 867)
- Abu'l-Abbas Ahmad ibn al-Furat, Abbasid official
- Al-Husayn ibn Zikrawayh, Qarmatian leader
- Al-Qasim ibn Ubayd Allah, Abbasid vizier
- Christopher, antipope of the Catholic Church
- Cui Yin, chancellor of the Tang dynasty (b. 854)
- Du Xunhe, Chinese poet (b. 846)
- Erenfried I, Frankish nobleman
- Harun ibn Khumarawayh, Tulunid emir
- Ímar ua Ímair, Norse king of Dublin
- John the Old Saxon, abbot of Athelney
- Ki no Tomonori, Japanese poet (approximate date)
- Kurszán, ruler (gyula) of the Magyars
- Lady Zhang, wife of Zhu Quanzhong
- Leo V, pope of the Catholic Church
- Li Shenfu, general of the Tang dynasty
- Llywarch ap Hyfaidd, king of Dyfed (Wales)
- Tannet of Pagan, king of Burma (b. 859)
- Wigmund, bishop of Dorchester (approximate date)
- Zhang Jun, chancellor of the Tang dynasty

905

- March 17 – Li Yu, Prince of De, prince of the Tang Dynasty
- July 5
  - Cui Yuan, Chinese chancellor
  - Dugu Sun, Chinese chancellor
  - Lu Yi, Chinese chancellor (b. 847)
  - Pei Shu, Chinese chancellor (b. 841)
  - Wang Pu, Chinese chancellor
- Du Hong, Chinese warlord
- Gai Yu, Chinese warlord
- Pei Zhi, Chinese chancellor
- Tribhuvana Mahadevi III, Indian Queen Regnant
- Rhodri ap Hyfaidd, king of Dyfed
- Yahya ibn al-Qasim, Idrisid emir of Morocco
- Yang Xingmi, Chinese governor (b. 852)

906

- January 22 – He, empress of the Tang dynasty
- January 27 – Liu Can, chancellor of the Tang dynasty
- February 27 – Conrad the Elder, Frankish nobleman
- September 9 – Adalbert von Babenberg, Frankish nobleman
- Acfred I, Frankish nobleman (approximate date)
- Dae Wihae, king of Balhae (Korea)
- Tughj ibn Juff, Abbasid governor
- Zhong Chuan, Chinese warlord

907

- May 2 – Boris I, ruler (knyaz) of the Bulgarian Empire
- July 4
  - Dietmar I, archbishop of Salzburg
  - Luitpold, margrave of Bavaria
- Alan I, duke ('king') of Brittany
- Árpád, Grand Prince of the Hungarians (approximate date)
- Herbert I, Frankish nobleman
- Isma'il ibn Ahmad, emir of the Samanid Empire
- Radelchis II, Lombard prince
- Rudesind I, bishop of Dumium (Spain)

908

- February 23 – Li Keyong, Shatuo governor (b. 856)
- March 25 – Li Kening, Chinese general
- March 26 – Ai, emperor of the Tang Dynasty (b. 892)
- April 25 – Zhang Wenwei, Chinese chancellor
- May 1 – Wang Zongji, Chinese prince and pretender
- June 9 – Yang Wo, emperor of Wu (b. 886)
- June 18 – Zhang Hao, Chinese general
- August 3
  - Burchard, duke of Thuringia
  - Egino, duke of Thuringia
  - Rudolf I, bishop of Würzburg
- August 13 – Al-Muktafi, Abbasid caliph
- September 13 – Cormac mac Cuilennáin, king of Munster (Ireland)
- December 17
  - Al-Abbas ibn al-Hasan al-Jarjara'i, Abbasid vizier
  - Abdallah ibn al-Mu'tazz, Abbasid poet (b. 861)
- Blaise of Amorion, Byzantine monk and missionary
- Cléirchén mac Murchadh, king of Maigh Seóla (Ireland)
- Denewulf, bishop of Winchester
- Li Sijian, Chinese warlord and governor
- Remigius of Auxerre, Frankish scholar
- Wang Shifan, Chinese warlord (b. 874)
- Xuefeng Yicun, Chinese Chan master (b. 822)

909

- April 18 – Dionysius II, Syriac Orthodox patriarch of Antioch
- May 9 – Adalgar, archbishop of Bremen
- Aribo of Austria, Frankish margrave
- Asser, bishop of Sherborne (approximate date)
- Cadell ap Rhodri, king of Seisyllwg (Wales)
- Cerball mac Muirecáin, king of Leinster (Ireland)
- Fujiwara no Tokihira, Japanese statesman (b. 871)
- Gerald of Aurillac, Frankish nobleman (b. 855)
- Luo Yin, Chinese statesman and poet (b. 833)
- Muhammad ibn Dawud al-Zahiri, Muslim theologian (b. 868)
- Sochlachan mac Diarmata, king of Uí Maine (Ireland)
- Wighelm, bishop of Selsey
