= 901 =

Calendar year

901 in various calendars
- Gregorian calendar: 901; CMI
- Ab urbe condita: 1654
- Armenian calendar: 350; ԹՎ ՅԾ
- Assyrian calendar: 5651
- Balinese saka calendar: 822–823
- Bengali calendar: 307–308
- Berber calendar: 1851
- Buddhist calendar: 1445
- Burmese calendar: 263
- Byzantine calendar: 6409–6410
- Chinese calendar: 庚申年 (Metal Monkey); 3598 or 3391 — to — 辛酉年 (Metal Rooster); 3599 or 3392
- Coptic calendar: 617–618
- Discordian calendar: 2067
- Ethiopian calendar: 893–894
- Hebrew calendar: 4661–4662
- Hindu calendars
- Vikram Samvat: 957–958
- Shaka Samvat: 822–823
- Kali Yuga: 4001–4002
- Holocene calendar: 10901
- Iranian calendar: 279–280
- Islamic calendar: 288–289
- Japanese calendar: Shōtai 4 / Engi 1 (延喜元年)
- Javanese calendar: 799–800
- Julian calendar: 901; CMI
- Korean calendar: 3234
- Minguo calendar: 1011 before ROC 民前1011年
- Nanakshahi calendar: −567
- Seleucid era: 1212/1213 AG
- Thai solar calendar: 1443–1444
- Tibetan calendar: ལྕགས་ཕོ་སྤྲེ་ལོ་ (male Iron-Monkey); 1027 or 646 or −126 — to — ལྕགས་མོ་བྱ་ལོ་ (female Iron-Bird); 1028 or 647 or −125

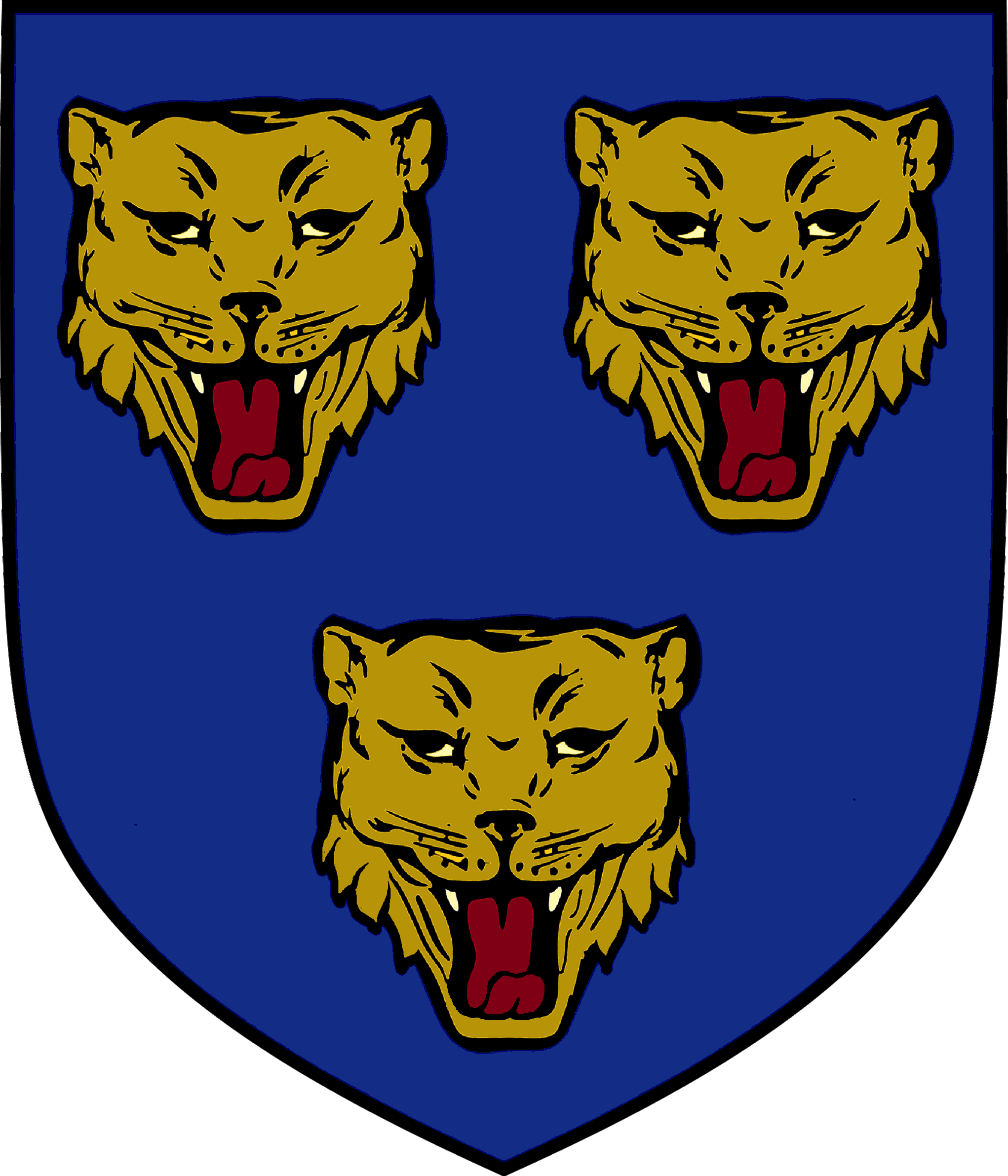
Shrewsbury is first mentioned as a city.

Year 901 (CMI) was a common year starting on Thursday of the Julian calendar.

== Events ==
=== By place ===
==== Europe ====
- February – King Louis III (the Blind) is crowned as Holy Roman Emperor by Pope Benedict IV at Rome. His rival Berengar I seeks refuge in Bavaria at the court of King Louis IV (the Child).
- March – Abu Abbas Abdallah resumes his Aghlabid campaign against the Byzantine enclaves of Sicily. He dispatches his fleet towards Messina, while bombarding the town walls of Damona.
- June 10 – Abu Abbas Abdallah crosses the Strait of Messina and proceeds to Reggio Calabria. Appearing before its walls, the Byzantine garrison flees, surrendering the city to the Aghlabids.
- Summer – Abu Abbas Abdallah defeats a relief Byzantine navy dispatched from Constantinople at Messina. He dismantles the fortifications of Messina and transfers his booty to Palermo.
- July 10 – Battle of Zamora: In Al-Andalus, Ibn al-Qitt and Abū Naṣr ‘Abd Allāh ibn ‘Alī al-Sarrāj call for a small jihad, but are defeated by King Alfonso III.

==== Britain ====
- Fall – Æthelwold (a son of Æthelred I) rebels against his cousin, King Edward the Elder. He comes with a fleet to Essex, and encourages the Danish Vikings of East Anglia to rise up.
- Edward the Elder takes the title "King of the Anglo-Saxons". His mother, Dowager-Queen Ealhswith, founds the Nunnaminster at Winchester and retires into a religious life there.
- The first written mention is made of Shrewsbury (West Midlands).

==== Arabian Empire ====
- February 18 – Thābit ibn Qurra dies at Baghdad, having served as court astronomer to the Abbasid Caliph Al-Mutadid. He has spent his life translating and teaching the works of Greek mathematicians, and of his own.
- Abu 'Abdullah al-Shi'i leads the rebellion of the Kutama Berbers (a movement of the Shiʿite Fatimids), against the Aghlabid emirate in Ifriqiya (modern Tunisia).

==== Asia ====
- January 24 – Emperor Zhao Zong of the Tang Dynasty (after he is briefly deposed by general Liu Jishu) is restored to the Chinese throne. Liu, with four eunuch family members are killed.
- January 25 – Sugawara no Michizane, a Japanese poet, is demoted from his aristocratic rank and is exiled to a minor official post at Dazaifu (Chikuzen Province).
- The Kingdom of Hu Goguryeo is established by the rebel leader Gung Ye. He subjugates the local lords in the Korean Peninsula and proclaims himself king.
- In China, Fuzhou City (Fujian Province) is expanded, with the construction of a new city wall ("Luo City").
- Abaoji is elected chieftain of the Yila tribe and becomes commander of all Khitan military forces.

==== Mesoamerica ====
- The Mesoamerican ballgame court is dedicated by the Maya ruler Chan Chak K'ak'nal Ajaw (also known as Lord Chac) at Uxmal (modern Mexico).
- The Toltecs establish themselves at Tula. The city becomes the capital and rises to prominence after the fall of Teotihuacan (approximate date).

=== By topic ===
==== Religion ====
- January – Arethas of Caesarea speaks on the occasion of the Epiphany. He becomes the official rhetor at the Byzantine court of Emperor Leo VI (the Wise) at Constantinople, and is nominated as Archbishop of Caesarea in Cappadocia.
- March 1 – Nicholas Mystikos, a layman close to Photios, becomes Patriarch of Constantinople.

== Births ==
- Biagota, probable wife of duke Boleslaus I of Bohemia

== Deaths ==
- January 24 – Liu Jishu, general of the Tang Dynasty
- February 12 – Antony II, patriarch of Constantinople
- February 18 – Thābit ibn Qurra, Syrian astronomer and physician (b. 826)
- April 12 – Eudokia Baïana, Byzantine empress and wife of Leo VI
- July 8 – Grimbald, Frankish Benedictine monk (b. 820)
- November 10 – Adelaide, queen of the West Frankish Kingdom
- Guaimar I of Salerno, Lombard prince
- Lady Shuiqiu, wife of Qian Kuan
- Lei Man, warlord of the Tang Dynasty
- Muhammad ibn Abi'l-Saj, Abbasid general
- Ubayd Allah ibn Sulayman, Abbasid vizier
- Wu Renbi, Chinese Taoist and writer
- Xu Yanruo, chancellor of the Tang Dynasty
