= 885 =

Calendar year

885 in various calendars
- Gregorian calendar: 885; DCCCLXXXV
- Ab urbe condita: 1638
- Armenian calendar: 334; ԹՎ ՅԼԴ
- Assyrian calendar: 5635
- Balinese saka calendar: 806–807
- Bengali calendar: 291–292
- Berber calendar: 1835
- Buddhist calendar: 1429
- Burmese calendar: 247
- Byzantine calendar: 6393–6394
- Chinese calendar: 甲辰年 (Wood Dragon); 3582 or 3375 — to — 乙巳年 (Wood Snake); 3583 or 3376
- Coptic calendar: 601–602
- Discordian calendar: 2051
- Ethiopian calendar: 877–878
- Hebrew calendar: 4645–4646
- Hindu calendars
- Vikram Samvat: 941–942
- Shaka Samvat: 806–807
- Kali Yuga: 3985–3986
- Holocene calendar: 10885
- Iranian calendar: 263–264
- Islamic calendar: 271–272
- Japanese calendar: Gangyō 9 / Ninna 1 (仁和元年)
- Javanese calendar: 783–784
- Julian calendar: 885; DCCCLXXXV
- Korean calendar: 3218
- Minguo calendar: 1027 before ROC 民前1027年
- Nanakshahi calendar: −583
- Seleucid era: 1196/1197 AG
- Thai solar calendar: 1427–1428
- Tibetan calendar: ཤིང་ཕོ་འབྲུག་ལོ་ (male Wood-Dragon); 1011 or 630 or −142 — to — ཤིང་མོ་སྦྲུལ་ལོ་ (female Wood-Snake); 1012 or 631 or −141

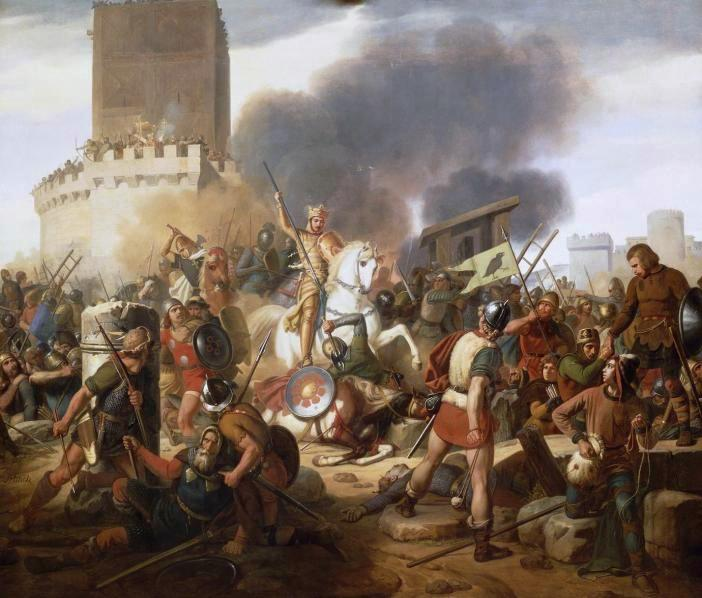
Count Odo defends Paris during the siege

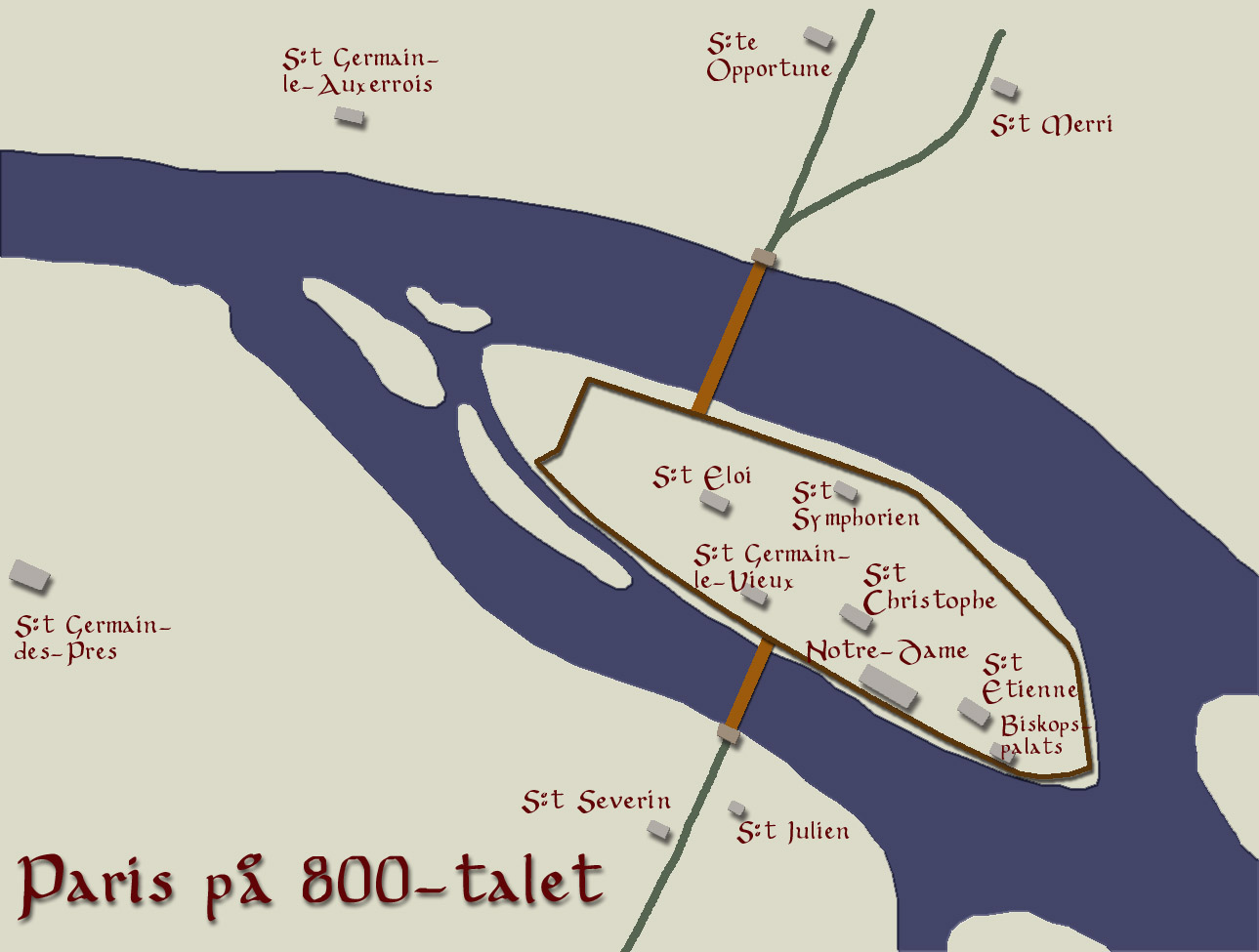
Map of Paris (Île de la Cité) in 9th century

Year 885 (DCCCLXXXV) was a common year starting on Friday of the Julian calendar.

== Events ==
=== By place ===
==== Europe ====
- Summer – Emperor Charles the Fat summons a meeting of officials at Lobith (modern Netherlands), and accuses Hugh, an illegitimate son of former king Lothair II, and his vassal Godfrid, Duke of Frisia, of plotting against him. Hugh is blinded, and exiled to the Abbey of Saint Gall (modern Switzerland). Godfrid is killed by a group of Frisian and Saxon nobles, at the connivance of Henry of Franconia. The local count, Gerolf, takes over the West Frisian coastline from the Danish, after the murder.
- Summer – Charles the Fat designates his illegitimate son Bernard as his heir, ignoring the claims of his nephew, Arnulf of Carinthia (illegitimate son of Carloman of Bavaria), and Charles the Simple (5-year-old son of King Louis the Stammerer). The Frankish bishops protest, so Charles summons Pope Adrian III to an assembly in Worms, to resolve the issue. Adrian leaves Rome in the hands of Bishop John of Pavia and heads to Germany, but dies on the way, just after crossing the River Po.
- November 25 – Siege of Paris: Viking forces, under the Norse chieftains Sigfred and Sinric, sail up the River Seine for eastern France, with a fleet of 300 longships (10,000 men). They appear before Paris, and offer to spare the city if they are allowed free passage, by paying them tribute (Danegeld). Their request is denied.
- November 27 – The Vikings begin the Siege of Paris by attacking the northeast tower with ballistae, mangonels and catapults. All Viking attacks are repulsed by Count Odo, who defends the city with a small garrison (about 200 men). Sigfred decides to withdraw, and builds a camp on the right bank of the river. Meanwhile he mines the city, and scours the countryside for provisions.

==== Britain ====
- King Alfred the Great summons Asser, a relative of Bishop Nobis of St. David's, to the English royal court. He agrees to spend six months of the year in the king's service. Asser helps to negotiate the recognition of Alfred, as overlord of the Welsh kings.
- Danish Vikings land in Kent and besiege Rochester. Town defences having been improved, the city holds out long enough for Alfred the Great to organize an army. He forces the Vikings to flee back across the Channel, to the Continent.
- A naval force raised by Alfred the Great takes part in the two Battles of the River Stour.
- Kings Hyfaidd of Dyfed, Elisedd of Brycheiniog and Hywel of Glywysing, being harassed by the armies of King Anarawd in Wales, seek the protection of Alfred the Great, and submit to his overlordship. Anarawd seeks an alliance with King Guthred of York.

==== Arabian Empire ====
- Battle of Tawahin: Muslim forces (4,000 men) of the Abbasid Caliphate, under Al-Mu'tadid, are defeated near Ramlah (modern Israel) by Khumarawayh, ruler of the Tulunid dynasty. This ends the Abbasid attempt to recover Syria from the Tulunids. A large part of the Abbasid army is captured, and transported to Egypt. Khumarawayh aims for reconciliation with the caliphal government, and allows the soldiers who want to return to modern-day Iraq to depart without ransom, while offering the rest the opportunity to settle in Egypt.

=== By topic ===
==== Religion ====
- July 8 – Pope Adrian III dies after a 1½ reign near Modena (Lombardy), while en route to an Imperial Diet, summoned by Charles the Fat at Worms. He is succeeded by Stephen V, as the 110th pope of the Catholic Church.

== Births ==
- Hyogong, king of Silla (Korea) (d. 912)
- February 6 – Daigo, emperor of Japan (d. 930)
- February 11 – Li Congke, emperor of Later Tang (d. 937)
- December 2 – Zhuang Zong, emperor of Later Tang (d. 926)
- Atto of Vercelli, Lombard bishop (d. 961)
- Eberhard III, duke of Franconia (d. 939)
- Eric Bloodaxe, Norwegian Viking ruler (d. 954)
- Fujiwara no Onshi, empress of Japan (d. 954)
- Gao Xingzhou, Chinese general (d. 952)
- Ibn Muqla, Muslim official and vizier (or 886)
- Reccared, Galician clergyman (d. 923)
- Zhao Ying, Chinese chancellor (d. 951)

== Deaths ==
- April 6 – Methodius, Byzantine missionary and bishop (b. 815)
- June – Godfrid, Duke of Frisia, 'the Sea King', murdered
- July 8 – Adrian III, pope of the Catholic Church
- July 25 – Ragenold, margrave of Neustria, killed
- July/August – Sulayman ibn Wahb, Muslim official and vizier
- November 17 – Liutgard of Saxony, Frankish queen
- Chen Ru, Chinese warlord and governor, killed
- Gerebald, bishop of Chalon-sur-Saône
- Mihira Bhoja, king of the Gurjara-Pratihara dynasty (b. 836)
- Muiredach mac Brain, king of Leinster (Ireland)
- Zhu Jingmei, Chinese eunuch and military leader, assassinated
