= 906 =

Calendar year

906 in various calendars
- Gregorian calendar: 906; CMVI
- Ab urbe condita: 1659
- Armenian calendar: 355; ԹՎ ՅԾԵ
- Assyrian calendar: 5656
- Balinese saka calendar: 827–828
- Bengali calendar: 312–313
- Berber calendar: 1856
- Buddhist calendar: 1450
- Burmese calendar: 268
- Byzantine calendar: 6414–6415
- Chinese calendar: 乙丑年 (Wood Ox); 3603 or 3396 — to — 丙寅年 (Fire Tiger); 3604 or 3397
- Coptic calendar: 622–623
- Discordian calendar: 2072
- Ethiopian calendar: 898–899
- Hebrew calendar: 4666–4667
- Hindu calendars
- Vikram Samvat: 962–963
- Shaka Samvat: 827–828
- Kali Yuga: 4006–4007
- Holocene calendar: 10906
- Iranian calendar: 284–285
- Islamic calendar: 293–294
- Japanese calendar: Engi 6 (延喜６年)
- Javanese calendar: 805–806
- Julian calendar: 906; CMVI
- Korean calendar: 3239
- Minguo calendar: 1006 before ROC 民前1006年
- Nanakshahi calendar: −562
- Seleucid era: 1217/1218 AG
- Thai solar calendar: 1448–1449
- Tibetan calendar: ཤིང་མོ་གླང་ལོ་ (female Wood-Ox); 1032 or 651 or −121 — to — མེ་ཕོ་སྟག་ལོ་ (male Fire-Tiger); 1033 or 652 or −120

King Constantine II of Scotland

Year 906 (CMVI) was a common year starting on Wednesday of the Julian calendar.

== Events ==
=== By place ===
==== Europe ====
- February 27 – Battle of Fritzlar: The Conradines defeat the Babenberg counts, to establish themselves as dukes of Franconia (modern-day Bavaria). Count Conrad the Elder is killed in the battle; his son Conrad the Younger becomes duke of Franconia.
- Summer – Duke Mojmir II halts the advance of the plundering Hungarians under Grand Prince Árpád in Great Moravia (approximate date).

==== Britain ====
- King Constantine II of Scotland calls for an assembly to meet at Scone. Scottish Christian clergy under Bishop Cellach pledges that the laws and disciplines of the faith, and the laws of churches and gospels, should be kept pariter cum Scottis.

==== Arabian Empire ====
- October 22 – Abbasid commander Ahmad ibn Kayghalagh leads a raid against the Byzantine Empire from Tarsus, joined by the governor Rustam ibn Baradu. He reaches the Halys River and takes 4,000–5,000 captives.

==== Asia ====
- January 22 – The warlord Zhu Quanzhong secretly puts Empress Dowager He, the wife of the late Emperor Zhaozong and mother of the reigning Emperor Ai, to death (by strangulation) and has her defamed and posthumously demoted to commoner rank.

==== Armenia ====
- 906 K'argop' earthquake: It takes place in the monastery K'argop', Armenia. The monastery is also known as Xotakerk', the monastery of the Vegetarians. The earthquake occurs approximately 150 years following the 735 Vayots Dzor Province earthquake, and affects the same region.

== Births ==
- June 21 – Abu Ja'far Ahmad ibn Muhammad, Saffarid emir (d. 963)
- Abu Tahir al-Jannabi, Qarmatian ruler (d. 944)
- Fujiwara no Atsutada, Japanese nobleman (d. 943)
- Guan Tong, Chinese landscape painter (approximate date)
- Liu Congxiao, Chinese general (d. 962)
- Majolus of Cluny, Frankish abbot (approximate date)
- Nasr II, Samanid emir (d. 943)
- Sherira Gaon, Jewish spiritual leader (d. 1006)

== Deaths ==
- January 22 – He, empress of the Tang dynasty
- January 27 – Liu Can, chancellor of the Tang dynasty
- February 27 – Conrad the Elder, Frankish nobleman
- September 9 – Adalbert von Babenberg, Frankish nobleman
- Acfred I, Frankish nobleman (approximate date)
- Dae Wihae, king of Balhae (Korea)
- Tughj ibn Juff, Abbasid governor
- Zhong Chuan, Chinese warlord

== Sources ==
- Guidoboni, Emanuela; Traina, Giusto (1995), "A new catalogue of earthquakes in the historical Armenian area from antiquity to the 12th century", Annals of Geophysics, 38, doi:10.4401/ag-4134
