= Auxilius =

Auxilius was a Roman cognomen. It can refer to several people:

- Auxilius of Ireland (died 459), Irish saint, brother of St. Seachnaill
- Auxilius (5th century), monk of Lérins, and later a martyr under Euric, Arian King of the Visigoths
- Auxilius of Naples (9th-century–10th-centuryth century), writer who was a contemporary of Pope Formosus
