= Antipope Christopher =

Illegitimate ruler of the Catholic Church from 903 to 904

- Papacy began: October 903
- Papacy ended: January 904
- Predecessor: Roman claimant: Leo V Antipapal claimant: Bibliothecarius
- Successor: Roman claimant: Leo V Sergius III; Antipapal claimant: Boniface VII
- Opposed to: Pope Leo V; Pope Sergius III
- Other post: Cardinal-priest

Personal details
- Died: After 904
- Denomination: Roman Catholic
- Parents: Leo (?)

Christopher (died after 904) claimed the papacy from October 903 to January 904. Although he was listed as a legitimate pope in most modern lists of popes until the first half of the 20th century, the apparently uncanonical method by which he obtained the papacy led to his being removed from the quasi-official roster of popes, the Annuario Pontificio. As such, he is now considered an antipope.

== Life and reign ==
Little is known about the life of Christopher; the lack of reliable, consistent sources makes it difficult to establish a concise biography. It is believed that he was a Roman, and that his father's name was Leo. He was cardinal-priest of St. Damasus when he became pope. His predecessor, Leo V, was deposed and imprisoned, most likely around October 903. As it is believed that Leo died in prison, Christopher may be regarded as pope after his death. However, the account of Auxilius of Naples says that Sergius III murdered both Leo V and Christopher. An eleventh-century Greek document says that Christopher was the first pope to state that the Holy Ghost proceeded "from the Father and from the Son". However, the document claims that Christopher made this profession to Sergius, patriarch of Constantinople. At that time, however, Nicholas Mystikos was patriarch of Constantinople, making the account historically suspect. (Sergius I was patriarch in 610–638, and Sergius II in 1001–1019.)

== Dethroning ==
Christopher was driven from the antipapacy by Pope Sergius III (904–911). Hermannus Contractus contends that Christopher was compelled to end his days living as a monk. However, the historian Eugenius Vulgarius says he was strangled in prison.

== Legitimacy ==
Some hold that Christopher was a legitimate pope, regardless of the illegitimate means by which he appears to have acquired the title. His name is included in all major catalogues of the popes through the early twentieth century. His portrait figures among the other likenesses of the popes in the Basilica of Saint Paul Outside the Walls in Rome, and among the frescoes of tenth-century popes painted in the thirteenth century on the walls of the ancient church of San Pietro a Grado, outside Pisa. He was, moreover, acknowledged as pope by his successors. For example, in confirming the privileges of the Abbey of Corbie in France, Leo IX mentioned the preceding grants of Benedict and Christopher. This privilege is the only one of Christopher's acts that is extant. However, he has not been considered a legitimate pope since the first half of the 20th century and has been erased from the Annuario pontificio's list of popes.

== See also ==
- Papal selection before 1059
