= Zhang Gui (Tang dynasty) =

Warlord in Chinese Tang dynasty (died 888)

Zhang Gui (張瓌) (d. February 10, 888) was a warlord late in the Chinese Tang dynasty who controlled Jingnan Circuit (荊南, headquartered in modern Jingzhou, Hubei) from 885 to 888.

== Background ==
Little is known about Zhang Gui's background, as he had no biography in either of the official histories of the Tang dynasty (the Old Book of Tang and the New Book of Tang), and it is not known when he was born. According to the Zizhi Tongjian, he was from Wei Prefecture (渭州, in modern Pingliang, Gansu)—although the modern Chinese historian Bo Yang, apparently believing that "Wei Prefecture" was erroneously written instead of "Hua Prefecture" (滑州, in modern Anyang, Henan), indicated that Zhang was from Hua Prefecture. In any case, Zhang became an officer at Huainan Circuit (淮南, headquartered in modern Yangzhou, Jiangsu), but later rebelled against the military governor (Jiedushi) Gao Pian. He seized Fu Prefecture (復州, in modern Tianmen, Hubei) and claimed the title of prefect.

In 885, Chen Ru the military governor of Jingnan was faced with repeated raids against the circuit by Lei Man the prefect of Lang Prefecture (朗州, in modern Changde, Hunan). He invited Zhang and another former Huainan officer, Han Shide (韓師德), who had also rebelled against Gao and taken over Yue Prefecture (岳州, in modern Yueyang, Hunan) as its prefect, to serve under him and attack Lei. Despite initially accepting Chen's invitation, neither actually did so—Han pillaged the region and then returned to Yue, while Zhang attacked Chen and seized Jingnan himself, claiming the title of military governor for himself. When Chen tried to flee to Chengdu, where then-reigning Emperor Xizong was (Emperor Xizong having fled the imperial capital Chang'an earlier due to the attack by the agrarian rebel Huang Chao), Zhang seized and imprisoned him.

== Rule of Jingnan ==
It was said that Zhang Gui was greedy and violent, and he slaughtered many veteran Jingnan officers. When he realized that the former eunuch monitor of Jingnan, Zhu Jingmei, who had retired, had much wealth, he had the soldiers attack Zhu's mansion at night, kill Zhu, and seize his wealth. He became fearful of the officer Guo Yu, who was considered a capable officer, and wanted to kill Guo. Guo, after receiving news, fled; Guo then attacked and seized Gui Prefecture (歸州, in modern Yichang, Hubei), claiming the title of prefect.

Later in the year, Qin Zongquan, a former Tang military governor who had rebelled and claimed the title of emperor himself, sent his brother Qin Zongyan (秦宗言) to attack Jingnan Circuit. Qin Zongyan put Jingnan's capital Jiangling Municipality under siege. During the siege, the officer Zhao Kuang (趙匡) plotted to rescue Chen Ru from imprisonment. When Zhang realized this, he put Zhao and Chen to death. Meanwhile, the food supplies ran out, such that the people resorted to eating human corpses. However, Qin Zongyan was unable to capture the city, and withdrew in late 886.

In 887, Qin Zongquan sent another general, Zhao Deyin, to attack Jingnan. In early 888, the city fell, and Zhang was killed. Zhao left his officer Wang Jianzhao in control of Jingnan and withdrew back to his base at Shannan East Circuit (山南東道, headquartered in modern Xiangyang, Hubei).
