= Fujiwara no Takafuji =

Fujiwara no Takafuji (藤原 高藤; 838 – April 13, 900), the second son of Yoshikado, was a kugyo (Japanese noble) of the Heian period. His mother was Takada no Haruko (高田春子), daughter of Takada no Shamimaro. His daughter was mother of Emperor Daigo, and he moved up by his grandson Emperor Daigo's accession in 897. Although his father's title was Udoneri (内舎人) that was bodyguard of emperors, he was appointed to Naidaijin (minister) in the end.

Takafuji is referred to as Ko-ichijō Naidaijin (小一条内大臣) or Kajūji Naidaijin (勧修寺内大臣).

He was the ancestor of Kajūji family.

== Career ==
- Kanpyō 7 (895): Sangi (参議)
- Kanpyō 9 (897): Chūnagon (中納言)
- Shōtai 2 (899): Dainagon (大納言)
- Shōtai 3, on the 28th day of the 1st month (900): Naidaijin (内大臣)
- Shōtai 3, on the 12th day of the 3rd month (900): Takafuji died at the age of 63

== Marriages and children ==
He was married to Miyaji no Tsurako (宮道 列子), daughter of Miyaji no Iyamasu.

Their children were

- Sadakuni (定国) (Izumi no Taishō, 泉大将) (867–906) - Dainagon (大納言) and Ukon'e no Taishō (右近衛大将) (Imperial Guard General)
- Fujiwara no Sadakata (定方) (Sanjō Udaijin, 三条右大臣) (873–932) - Udaijin (右大臣)
- Inshi/Taneko (胤子) (died 896), consort of Emperor Uda and mother of Emperor Daigo
- Manshi/Mitsuko (満子) (872–937) - Naishi-no-Kami (尚侍) 907–937
