= Zhu Jingmei =

Zhu Jingmei (朱敬玫) (d. 885) was a Chinese eunuch during the late Tang dynasty who, after killing Duan Yanmo the military governor (jiedushi) of Jingnan Circuit (荊南, headquartered in modern Jingzhou, Hubei), became the effective ruling authority for the circuit due to his command of the elite Zhongyong Army (忠勇軍). In 885, however, he was assassinated by Zhang Gui, who had just forcibly seized the circuit after arresting the Zhu-appointed military governor Chen Ru.

== Conflict with Duan Yanmo and takeover of circuit ==
Little is known about Zhu Jingmei's background, because, although the official histories of Tang dynasty, the Old Book of Tang and the New Book of Tang, both contained collections of biographies for prominent eunuchs, neither collection contained a biography for Zhu. What is known is that Zhu became the eunuch monitor of the army at Jingnan Circuit sometime in or after 880 (when Yang Fuguang was still the eunuch monitor at Jingnan) and in or before 882.

After Zhu took up his position as eunuch monitor at Jingnan, he organized a group of 3,000 elite soldiers into a Zhongyong Army (忠勇軍), under his own command. He also got into conflicts with the military governor Duan Yanmo, and Duan planned to kill him. Zhu preemptively acted and, in 882, attacked and killed Duan. He then made the deputy mayor of Jingnan's capital Jiangling Municipality (江陵) acting military governor. Then-reigning Emperor Xizong (who was then at Chengdu after the imperial capital Chang'an had fallen to the major agrarian rebel Huang Chao), hearing what happened, commissioned the imperial official Zheng Shaoye (鄭紹業), who had previously served as military governor of Jingnan, as military governor. However, Zheng was fearful of Zhu and did not report to Jingnan. Zhu thereafter made the officer Chen Ru acting military governor, a commission that Emperor Xizong subsequently confirmed; yet later in 884, Emperor Xizong made Chen military governor. It was said that while Zhu was in control of Jingnan, he found excuses to slaughter many officers and merchants and seize their wealths, making himself very wealthy. At one point, when Emperor Xizong tried to recall him and replace him with Yang Xuanhui (楊玄晦), he refused to be recalled and settled down in Jiangling.

== Death ==
In 885, Chen Ru, while having been commissioned by Zhu, became weary of the lack of discipline the Zhongyong Army showed, and decided to take action. Previously, when Zheng Shaoye was military governor, he had put the officer Shentu Cong (申屠琮) in command of a group of soldiers to serve in the campaign against Huang Chao. When Shentu and his soldiers returned to Jingnan in 885, Chen informed Shentu of the situation and ordered him to destroy the Zhongyong Army. When the Zhongyong officer Cheng Junzhi (程君之) found out, he tried to take his soldiers and flee to Lang Prefecture (朗州, in modern Changde, Hunan). Shentu pursued and attacked him, killing more than 100 Zhongyong soldiers on the way and causing the rest to scatter. Shentu thereafter became briefly dominant in the Jingnan Circuit government. Soon thereafter, though, when Chen tried to induce two army officers from Huainan Circuit (淮南, headquartered in modern Yangzhou, Jiangsu)—Zhang Gui and Han Shide (韓師德)—to attack the prefect of Lang, Lei Man, who had been repeatedly pillaging the region, Zhang not only did not attack Lei, but instead attacked Jiangling and expelled Chen. Chen tried to flee to Emperor Xizong's court at Chengdu, but Zhang intercepted him and put him under arrest in Jiangling. Thereafter, Zhang became aware of the wealth that Zhu Jingmei had accumulated, and therefore sent soldiers to kill Zhu at his mansion at night and seize Zhu's wealth.
