= Duan Yanmo =

Duan Yanmo (段彥謨; died July 17, 882) was a Chinese military general and warlord during the Tang dynasty who, from 880 to 882, controlled Jingnan Circuit (荊南, headquartered in modern Jingzhou, Hubei) in conjunction with the eunuch Zhu Jingmei, but later had a fallout with Zhu and was killed by Zhu.

== Background ==
Not much is known about Duan Yanmo's background, as he did not have a biography in either of the official histories of the Tang dynasty, the Old Book of Tang or the New Book of Tang. What is known is that he was an army officer from Taining Circuit (泰寧, headquartered in modern Jining, Shandong) who participated in the operations against the major agrarian rebel Huang Chao early in the reign of Emperor Xizong. In 879, the imperial government commissioned him to replace Cao Quanzhen (曹全晸) as the commander of the operations against Huang west of the Yangtze River—while Cao was pursuing Huang in the aftermaths of a major defeat Cao and Liu Jurong (劉巨容) the military governor (Jiedushi) of Shannan East Circuit (山南東道, headquartered in modern Xiangfan, Hubei) had just dealt Huang—which led to Cao's termination of the pursuit, allowing Huang and Huang's major general Shang Rang to escape.

== Control of Jingnan ==
Meanwhile, with Liu Jurong having returned to Shannan East after defeating Huang, and with the overall commander of the operations, the former chancellor Wang Duo, who was also the military governor of Jingnan, having fled prior to Cao's and Liu's defeat of Huang Chao, there was no military governor around to govern Jingnan Circuit. The eunuch monitor of the army in the region, Yang Fuguang, put Song Hao (宋浩), an officer from Zhongwu Circuit (忠武, headquartered in modern Xuchang, Henan) in charge of the circuit until the imperial government could commission a replacement. The imperial government subsequently confirmed Song's temporary commission. This drew anger from Duan Yanmo, who considered himself superior to Song. The conflict came to a head in 880 when, in violation of an order that Song issued that soldiers were not to cut down trees on the streets of the circuit capital Jiangling Municipality (江陵), some of Duan's soldiers did so, and Song whipped them on the back. Duan viewed this as an insult, and he intruded into Song's headquarters and killed Song and Song's two sons. Yang then submitted a report stating that Song was overly cruel and that was why the soldiers killed him. (According to Yang's biography in the New Book of Tang, Yang encouraged Duan's actions since Song was disrespectful to Yang as well.) Emperor Xizong then issued an edict making Duan the prefect of Lang Prefecture (朗州, in modern Changde, Hunan) while making the imperial official Zheng Shaoye (鄭紹業) the new military governor. However, it appeared that Duan did not report to Lang Prefecture, for it was said that Zheng, in fear of Duan's control of Jingnan, did not report to Jingnan for some half a year. Subsequently, when Huang captured the imperial capital Chang'an around the new year 881 and forced Emperor Xizong to flee to Chengdu, Emperor Xizong recalled Zheng and made Duan the military governor of Jingnan.

== Death ==
Duan Yanmo and the new eunuch monitor, Zhu Jingmei, soon developed an adversarial relationship. Zhu selected 3,000 elite soldiers and called them the Zhongyong Army, putting it under his own command. Duan, in anger, decided that he wanted to kill Zhu. However, Zhu took preemptive action in summer 882 and attacked Duan, killing him. Zhu initially made the deputy mayor of Jiangling, Li Sui (李燧), acting military governor, and then, when Emperor Xizong commissioned Zheng again but Zheng hesitated to report to Jingnan, put the officer Chen Ru in charge.
