= Wang Jianzhao =

Wang Jianzhao (王建肇) was a warlord late in the Chinese Tang dynasty, who controlled Jingnan Circuit (荊南, headquartered in modern Jingzhou, Hubei) from 887 to 888, and then Wutai Circuit (武泰, headquartered in modern Chongqing) from 888 to 896, when he surrendered to Wang Jian.

== Background and control of Jingnan ==
Little is known about Wang Jianzhao's background, as there was no biography for him in any of the official histories. The first historical reference to him was in 887, as of which time he was serving under Zhao Deyin, who had then claimed the title of acting military governor of Shannan East Circuit (山南東道, headquartered in modern Xiangyang, Hubei) under allegiance to Qin Zongquan—who was formerly a Tang general but who had rebelled against the rule of Emperor Xizong and claimed the title of emperor himself at Cai Prefecture (蔡州, in modern Zhumadian, Henan). Late in 887, Zhao attacked Tang's Jingnan Circuit and killed its military governor (jiedushi) Zhang Gui. He then left Wang in charge of Jingnan, whose capital Jiangling Municipality was said to have only a few hundred families left after the warfare.

In 888, the Tang prefect of Gui Prefecture (歸州, in modern Yichang, Hubei), Guo Yu attacked Jingnan and expelled Wang. Wang fled to Qian Prefecture (黔州, in modern Chongqing). Apparently, some time later, perhaps around 890, Wang submitted to Tang imperial authority and was made the military governor of Wutai Circuit.

== As military governor of Wutai ==
Little is known about Wang Jianzhao's governance of Wutai. In 896, Guo Yu (who, by that point, had changed his name back to his birth name of Cheng Rui, which he changed to Guo Yu during a time when he was fleeing from disaster), along with his subordinate Xu Cun (許存), headed west on the Yangtze River to capture Wang's territory. Wang was unable to resist their attack, and he abandoned Qian Prefecture and withdrew to Fengdu (豐都, in modern Chongqing).

Cheng made his subordinate Zhao Wu (趙武) the acting military governor of Wutai. Zhao thereafter made repeated attacks on Wang at Fengdu. Wang could not resist Zhao's attacks, so he surrendered to Wang Jian the military governor of Xichuan Circuit (西川, headquartered in modern Chengdu, Sichuan). That was the last historical reference to Wang Jianzhao, and it is not known whether he served in any campaigns under Wang Jian or when he died.
