= Fujiwara no Yoshikado =

Japanese statesman, courtier and politician

- Parents: Fujiwara no Fuyutsugu (father)

Fujiwara no Yoshikado (藤原良門; 8th-9th century) was a Japanese statesman, courtier and politician during the Heian period.

== Career at court ==
He was a minister holding the title of daijō-daijin.

== Genealogy ==
This member of the Fujiwara clan was the sixth son of Fujiwara no Fuyutsugu. Among Yoshikada's brothers were Fujiwara no Yoshifusa, Fujiwara no Nagayoshi and Fujiwara no Yoshisuke.

Descendants of Yoshikado include, Fujiwara no Kanesuke, Fujiwara no Masatada, Fujiwara no Tametoki and Murasaki Shikibu.

His immediate descendants were two sons by the names of Fujiwara no Takafuji and Fujiwara no Toshimoto.

Yoshikado is considered the ancestor of the Uesugi clan, the Ii clan, and the Nichiren clan.
