= Bishopric of Constance =

Bishopric of Constance may refer to:

- Diocese of Constance, the spiritual jurisdiction of the bishops of Constance from c. 585 until 1821
- Prince-Bishopric of Constance, the secular jurisdiction of the bishops of Constance from 1155 until 1803

== See also ==
- List of bishops of Constance
