= Chen Ru =

Chen Ru (Chinese: 陳儒; Chinese: 陈儒；d. 885) was a warlord late in the Chinese Tang dynasty, who ruled Jingnan Circuit (荊南 modern Jingzhou, Hubei) from 882 to 885, most of that time as its military governor (jiedushi).

== Background ==
It is not known when Chen Ru was born, but it is known that he was from Jingnan Circuit's capital Jiangling Municipality and that his ancestors had served for generations as army officers.

As of 882, the military governor of Jingnan, Duan Yanmo, had an adversarial relationship with the eunuch monitor of the Jingnan army, Zhu Jingmei. Zhu selected 3,000 elite soldiers and called them the Zhongyong Army, putting it under his own command. Duan, in anger, decided that he wanted to kill Zhu. However, Zhu took preemptive action in summer 882 and attacked Duan, killing him. Zhu initially made the deputy mayor of Jiangling, Li Sui (李燧), acting military governor. Then-reigning Emperor Xizong commissioned a former military governor of Jingnan, Zheng Shaoye (鄭紹業), as military governor, but Zheng, in fear of Zhu hesitated to report to Jingnan. Zhu then made Chen acting military governor. In 883, Emperor Xizong confirmed Chen as acting military governor and removed Zheng officially, and later in the year made Chen full military governor.

== As military governor ==
In 885, Chen Ru, while having been commissioned by Zhu, became weary of the lack of discipline the Zhongyong Army showed, and decided to take action. Previously, when Zheng Shaoye was military governor, he had put the officer Shentu Cong (申屠琮) in command of a group of soldiers to serve in the campaign against Huang Chao. When Shentu and his soldiers returned to Jingnan in 885, Chen informed Shentu of the situation and ordered him to destroy the Zhongyong Army. When the Zhongyong officer Cheng Junzhi (程君之) found out, he tried to take his soldiers and flee to Lang Prefecture (朗州, in modern Changde, Hunan). Shentu pursued and attacked him, killing more than 100 Zhongyong soldiers on the way and causing the rest to scatter. Shentu thereafter became briefly dominant in the Jingnan Circuit government, although Chen remained military governor.

Meanwhile, Jingnan also faced the continuous raids from Lei Man, who had seized Lang Prefecture (朗州, in modern Changde, Hunan). Chen decided that he could invite Zhang Gui and Han Shide (韓師德), two army officers who had rebelled against Gao Pian the military governor of Huainan Circuit (淮南, headquartered in modern Yangzhou, Jiangsu) and who had seized Fu (復州, in modern Tianmen, Hubei) and Yue (岳州, in modern Yueyang, Hunan) Prefectures respectively, to help him fight Lei. He gave Zhang the title of acting army commander of Jingnan and Han the title of acting deputy military governor, asking them to attack Lei. Instead, Han initially advanced to the Three Gorges region and then returned to Yue Prefecture after pillaging the region, while Zhang instead attacked Jiangling and forced Chen to flee. Chen tried to head for Emperor Xizong's then-location at Chengdu (as Emperor Xizong had to flee there after the major agrarian rebel Huang Chao captured the imperial capital Chang'an in 881 and had not yet returned to Chang'an). Zhang sent soldiers to pursue Chen and intercepted him, seizing him and taking him back to Jiangling, to be put under arrest.

Later in 885, when Chen Ru was still under arrest, Qin Zongquan, who was formerly a Tang-commissioned military governor of Fengguo Circuit (奉國, headquartered in modern Zhumadian, Henan) but who had turned against the Tang court and declared himself emperor, sent an army commanded by his brother Qin Zongyan (秦宗言) to attack Jingnan. With Jiangling under siege by Qin's army, the Jingnan officer Zhao Kuang (趙匡) plotted to rescue Chen and restore him. The plot was discovered by Zhang Gui. Zhang executed Zhao and cut off food supplies to Chen, who died after seven days.
