= Emperor Daigo =

Emperor of Japan from 897 to 930

Emperor Daigo 醍醐天皇
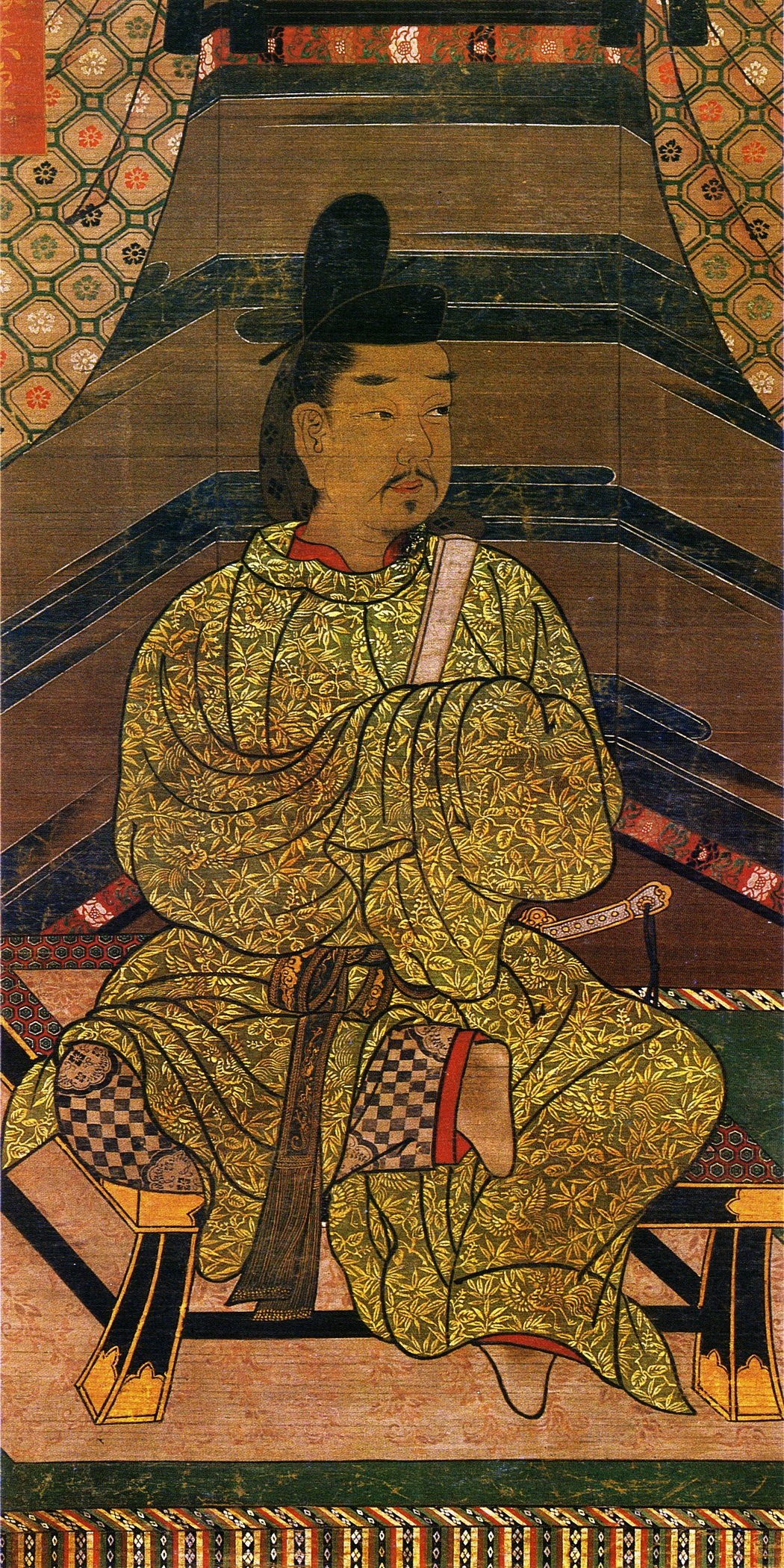

Emperor of Japan
- Reign: August 4, 897 – October 16, 930
- Enthronement: August 14, 897
- Predecessor: Uda
- Successor: Suzaku
- Born: 6 February 884; Heian Kyō (Kyōto)
- Died: 23 October 930 (aged 46); Heian Kyō (Kyōto)
- Burial: Nochi no Yamashina no misasagi (後山科陵) (Kyoto)
- Spouse: Fujiwara no Onshi
- Issue more...: Emperor Suzaku; Emperor Murakami
Posthumous name
- Tsuigō: Emperor Daigo (醍醐天皇)
- House: Imperial House of Japan
- Father: Emperor Uda
- Mother: Fujiwara no Inshi

Emperor Daigo (醍醐天皇, Daigo-tennō; February 6, 884 – October 23, 930) was the 60th emperor of Japan, according to the traditional order of succession.

Daigo's reign spanned the years from 897 through 930. He is named after his place of burial.

== Genealogy ==
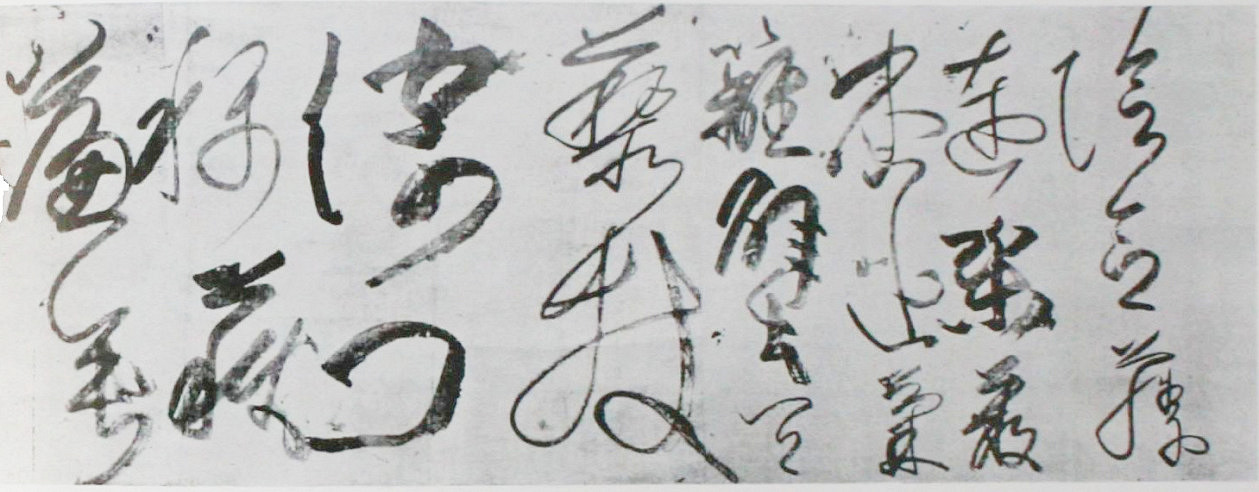
Calligraphy attributed to Emperor Daigo

Daigo was the eldest son of his predecessor, Emperor Uda. His mother was Fujiwara no Taneko (or Inshi), daughter of the minister of the center, Fujiwara no Takafuji. He succeeded the throne at a young age after his father, the Emperor Uda, abdicated in 897. His mother died before his ascension, so he was raised by another Uda consort, Fujiwara no Onshi, daughter of the former kampaku Fujiwara no Mototsune.

Daigo's grandfather, Emperor Kōkō, had demoted his sons from the rank of imperial royals to that of subjects in order to reduce the state expenses, as well as their political influence; in addition, they were given the family name Minamoto. As such, Daigo was not born as a royalty and was named Minamoto no Korezane (源維城) until 887, when Daigo's father, Minamoto no Sadami (formerly Prince Sadami), was once again promoted to the Imperial Prince and the heir to the throne. Afterwards, his personal name (imina) was changed to Atsuhito (敦仁親王) or Ono-tei before his ascension of the Chrysanthemum Throne.

Daigo had 21 empresses, imperial consorts, and concubines; he had 36 imperial sons and daughters.

== Events of Daigo's life ==
The era name was changed in 898 to mark the beginning of Emperor Daigo's reign. The highlight of Daigo's 34-year reign was that he ruled by himself without the regency of the Fujiwara clan, though he himself was part Fujiwara.

- August 4, 897 (Kanpyō 9, 3rd day of the 7th month ): In the 10th year of Uda-tennō's reign (宇多天皇十年), Emperor Uda abdicated; and his eldest son received the succession ("senso").
- August 14, 897 (Kanpyō 9, 13th day of the 7th month): Emperor Daigo formally acceded to the throne (sokui).
- December 7, 899 (Shōtai 2, 1st day of the 11th month): The sun entered into the winter solstice, and all the great officials of the empire presented themselves in Daigo's court.
- February 2, 900 (Shōtai 3, 3rd day of the 1st month): Daigo went to visit his father in the place Uda had chosen to live after the abdication.
- 900 (Shōtai 3, 10th month): The former Emperor Uda traveled to Mount Kōya (高野山, , Kōya-san) in what is now Wakayama prefecture to the south of Osaka. He visited the temples on the slopes of the mountain.
- January 23, 901 (Engi 1, 1st day of the 1st month): There was an eclipse of the sun.
- 901 (Engi 1, 1st month): The Sugawara Michizane "incident" developed, but more details cannot be known because Daigo ordered that diaries and records from this period be burned.
- 906 (Engi 5, 4th month): Ki-no Tsurayuki presented the emperor with the compilation of the Kokin Wakashū, a collection of waka poetry.
- 909 (Engi 9, 4th month ): The sadaijin Fujiwara no Tokihira died at the age of 39. He was honored with the posthumous title of regent.
- 929 (Enchō 7, 8th month): Floods devastated the country and many perished.
- July 21, 930 (Enchō 8, 26th day of the 6th month): A huge black storm cloud traveled from the slopes of Mt. Atago to Heian-kyō accompanied by frightful thunder. Lightning struck the Imperial Palace. Both Senior Counselor Fuijwara-no Kiyotsura (also known as Miyoshi no Kiyoyuki) and Middle Controller of the Right Taira-no Mareyo and many other subaltern officers were killed and their bodies were consumed in the subsequent fires. The deaths were construed as an act of revenge by the unsettled spirit of the late Sugawara Michizane.
- October 16, 930 (Enchō 8, 22nd day of the 9th month): In the 34th year of Daigo-tennō's reign (醍醐天皇34年), the emperor fell ill and, fearing that he might not survive, Daigo abdicated. At this point, the succession (senso) was said to have been received by his son. Shortly thereafter, Emperor Suzaku is said to have acceded to the throne (sokui).
- October 23, 930 (Enchō 8, 29th day of the 9th month): Emperor Daigo entered the Buddhist priesthood in the very early morning hours. As a monk, he took the Buddhist name Hō-kongō and, shortly thereafter, he died at the age of 46. This monk was buried in the precincts of Daigo-ji, which is why the former-emperor's posthumous name became Daigo-tennō.

Daigo also ordered construction of several halls in the Daigo-ji, such as the Yakushi hall.

The actual site of Daigo's grave is known. This emperor is traditionally venerated at a memorial Shinto shrine (misasagi) at Kyoto.

The Imperial Household Agency designates this location as Daigo's mausoleum. It is formally named Nochi no Yamashina no misasagi in Fushimi-ku, Kyoto.

=== Kugyō ===
Kugyō (公卿) is a collective term for the very few most powerful men attached to the court of the Emperor of Japan in pre-Meiji eras.

In general, this elite group included only three to four men at a time. These were hereditary courtiers whose experience and background have brought them to the pinnacle of a life's career. During Daigo's reign, this apex of the Daijō-kan included:

- Sesshō, Fujiwara no Tokihira (藤原時平), 909.
- Sadaijin, Fujiwara no Tokihira 871–909.
- Sadaijin, Fujiwara no Tadahira (藤原忠平), 880–949.
- Udaijin, Sugawara no Michizane (菅原道真), 845–901.
- Udaijin, Minamoto no Hikaru (源光), 845–913.
- Udaijin, Fujiwara no Tadahira.
- Udaijin, Fujiwara no Sadakata (藤原定方), 873–932.
- Naidaijin, Fujiwara no Takafuji (藤原高藤), 838–900.
- Dainagon

== Eras of Daigo's reign ==
The years of Daigo's reign are more specifically identified by more than one era name or nengō.

- Kanpyō (889–898)
- Shōtai (898–901)
- Engi (901–923)
- Enchō (923–931)

== Consorts and children ==
Empress (Chūgū): Fujiwara no Onshi (藤原穏子), Kampaku Fujiwara no Mototsune's daughter

- Second son: Imperial Prince Yasuakira (保明親王; 903–923), Emperor Daigo's crown prince, called Bunkengentaishi (文献彦太子)
- Fourteenth daughter: Imperial Princess Koushi (康子内親王; 919–957), married to Udaijin Fujiwara no Morosuke
- Fourteenth son: Imperial Prince Hirokira (also known as Yutaakira 寛明親王) later Emperor Suzaku
- Sixteenth son: Imperial Prince Nariakira (成明親王) later Emperor Murakami

Consort (Hi): Imperial Princess Ishi (為子内親王) (d.899), Emperor Kōkō's daughter

- First Daughter: Imperial Princess Kanshi (勧子内親王; 899–910)

Consort (Nyōgo): Minamoto no Washi (源和子; d.947), Emperor Kōkō's daughter

- Fourth daughter: Imperial Princess Keishi (慶子内親王; 903–923), married Imperial Prince Atsukata (Emperor Uda's son)
- Fifth Son: Imperial Prince Tsuneakira (常明親王; 906–944)
- Sixth son: Imperial Prince Noriakira (式明親王; 907–966)
- Seventh son: Imperial Prince Ariakira (有明親王; 910–961)
- Thirteenth daughter: Imperial Princess Shōshi (韶子内親王; 918–980), 13th Saiin in Kamo Shrine 921–930; later, married Minamoto no Kiyokage
- Seventeenth daughter: Imperial Princess Seishi/Tadako (斉子内親王; 921–936), 27th Saiō in Ise Shrine 936, but she did not go to Ise because of her death.

Consort (Nyōgo): Fujiwara no Nōshi (藤原能子; d.964), Udaijin Fujiwara no Sadakata's daughter; later married to Fujiwara no Saneyori

Consort (Nyōgo): Court Lady Fujiwara no Wakako (藤原和香子, d.935), Dainagon Fujiwara no Sadakuni's daughter

Court Attendant (Koui): Minamoto no Fūshi/Kaneko (源封子), Ukyōdaibu Minamoto no Motomi's daughter

- Second Daughter: Imperial Princess Nobuko/Senshi (宣子内親王; 902–920), 12th Saiin in Kamo Shrine 915–920
- First Son: Imperial Prince Yoshiakira (克明親王; 903–927), father of the musician Minamoto no Hiromasa
- Twelfth Daughter: Imperial Princess Seishi (靖子内親王; 915–950), removed from the Imperial Family by receiving the family name from Emperor (Shisei Kōka, 賜姓降下) in 921; later, Imperial Princess in 930. married to Fujiwara no Morouji

Court Attendant (Koui): Fujiwara no Senshi (藤原鮮子; d.915), Iyonosuke (伊予介) Fujiwara no Tsuranaga's daughter

- Third Daughter: Imperial Princess Takako/Kyōshi (恭子内親王, 902–915), 11th Saiin in Kamo Shrine 903–915
- Third son: Imperial Prince Yoakira (代明親王; 904–937)
- Sixth Daughter: Imperial Princess Yoshiko/Enshi (婉子内親王; 904–969), 14th Saiin in Kamo Shrine 932–967
- Ninth Daughter: Imperial Princess Toshiko (敏子内親王; b.906)

Court Attendant (Koui): Minamoto no Noboru's daughter

- Fourth Son: Imperial Prince Shigeakira (重明親王; 906–954), author of the Ribuōki (吏部王記)

Court Attendant (Koui): Minamoto no Chikako (源周子; d.935), Sadaiben Minamoto no Tonau's daughter

- Fifth Daughter: Imperial Princess Kinshi (勤子内親王; 904–938), married to Udaijin Fujiwara no Morosuke
- Seventh Daughter: Imperial Princess Miyako (都子内親王; 905–981)
- Tenth Daughter: Imperial Princess Masako/Gashi (雅子内親王; 909–954), 26th Saiō in Ise Shrine 932–936; later, married to Udaijin Fujiwara no Morosuke
- Eighth Son: Imperial Prince Tokiakira (時明親王; 912–927)
- Twelfth Son: Minamoto no Takaakira (源高明; 914–982), also called Nishinomiya (西宮) Sadaijin
- Daughter: Minamoto no Kenshi (源兼子; 915–949), removed from the Imperial Family by receiving the family name from Emperor (Shisei Kōka, 賜姓降下) in 921
- Eighteenth son: Imperial Prince Moriakira (盛明親王; 928–986), given the family name 'Minamoto' from Emperor (Shisei Kōka, 賜姓降下); later, Imperial Prince in 967.

Court Attendant (Koui): Princess Manshi (満子女王; d.920), Prince Sukemi's daughter

- Eighth daughter: Imperial Princess Shūshi (修子内親王; d.933), married to Imperial Prince Motoyoshi
- Eleventh daughter: Imperial Princess Fushi (普子内親王; 910–947), married to Minamoto no Kiyohira, later to Fujiwara no Toshitsura

Court Attendant (Koui): Fujiwara no Yoshihime (藤原淑姫; d.948), Sangi Fujiwara no Sugane's daughter

- Eleventh Son: Imperial Prince Kaneakira (兼明親王; 914–987), also called saki no chūshoō (前中書王). Chūshoō means Nakatsukasa-kyō (中務卿).
- Son: Minamoto no Yoriakira (源自明; 911–958)
- Ninth Son: Imperial Prince Nagaakira (長明親王; 913–953)
- Sixteenth Daughter: Imperial Princess Hideko/Eishi (英子内親王; 921–946), 29th Saiō in Ise Shrine 946, but she did not go to Ise because of her death.

Court Attendant (Koui): Fujiwara no Kuwako (藤原桑子), Chūnagon Fujiwara no Kanesuke's daughter

- Thirteenth Son: Imperial Prince Akiakira (章明親王; 924–990)

Court Attendant (Koui): Chūjō-Koui (中将更衣), Fujiwara no Korehira's daughter

- Minamoto no Tameakira (源為明; 927–961)

Court Attendant (Koui): Minamoto no Toshimi's daughter

- Minamoto no Nobuakira (源允明; 919–942)

Court Attendant (Koui): Minamoto Kiyoko (源清子)

Court Attendant (Koui): Fujiwara Doshi (藤原同子)

Court Attendant (Koui): Minamoto Haruko (源暖子)

Unknown

- Minamoto no Genshi (源厳子; b.916)

== Ancestry ==
Ancestors of Emperor Daigo

8. Emperor Ninmyō (808-850)
4. Emperor Kōkō (830-867)
9. Fujiwara no Takushi (d. 839)
2. Emperor Uda (867-931)
10. Prince Nakano (792-867)
5. Princess Hanshi (833-900)
11. Tōsō
1. Emperor Daigo
12. Fujiwara no Yoshikado
6. Fujiwara no Takafuji (838-900)
13. Takada no Haruko
3. Fujiwara no Inshi (d. 896)
14. Miyaji no Iyamasu
7. Miyaji no Tsurako

== See also ==
- Emperor of Japan
- List of Emperors of Japan
- Imperial cult
- Minamoto clan

== Notes ==
Japanese Imperial kamon — a stylized chrysanthemum blossom

Regnal titles
Preceded by Emperor Uda	Emperor of Japan: Daigo; 897–930	Succeeded by Emperor Suzaku
