= 906 K'argop' earthquake =

Earthquake in Armenia

Coordinates: 39.724°N 45.475°E

The 906 K'argop' earthquake took place in the monastery K'argop', Armenia, c. 906. The monastery was also known as Xotakerk', the monastery of the Vegetarians. The earthquake occurred approximately 150 years following the 735 Vayots Dzor Province earthquake, and affected the same region.

The historian Stepanos Orbelian (13th century) mentions the destruction of the church and the whole monastery building of K'argop', which he dates as following the death of "the pious" prince Ashot (possibly Ashot I of Armenia, who died in 890).

In 910, there was correspondence between Queen Šušan and Hovhannes Draskhanakerttsi, Catholicos of All Armenians concerning an ongoing effort to rebuild the church and monastery. The rebuilding concluded in 911.

The rebuilt monastery is located about 1 km (0.62 mi) to the north of the village of Xacik. Surviving remains from the monastery include stone structures, consisting of "squared blocks of stone". The blocks of the external corners are "symmetrically hewed". Also symmetrical are the visible building structures.

== Sources ==
- Guidoboni, Emanuela; Traina, Giusto (1995), A new catalogue of earthquakes in the historical Armenian area from antiquity to the 12th century, Annals of Geophysics
