= Eugenius Vulgarius =

Italian priest and poet

Eugenius Vulgarius (Italian Eugenio Vulgario; fl. c. 887–928) was an Italian priest and poet.

Eugenius' epithet may allude to a Bulgar heritage, and he may have been a descendant of the horde of Alzec that settled in the Molise in the seventh century and were still distinguishable by their language in the late eighth century. The ethnonym was sometimes rendered as Vulgares in Latin. Knowledgeable of Latin and Greek, he was also deeply learned in the Classics and displays familiarity with Virgil, Horace, and the tragedies of Seneca.

Around 907, when he was a presbyter and teacher of rhetoric and grammar at the episcopal school in Naples, Eugenius wrote a pamphlet defending Pope Formosus, who had given him holy orders, from the attacks of the reigning Pope Sergius III. He produced a second treatise on this same subject in dialogue form. In these, entitled De causa Formosiana and Eugenius Vulgarius Petro Diacono fratri et amico, he denies the authority of the Holy See and proclaims that only a deserving man can ever truly be pope. Sergius ordered him imprisoned in a monastery, probably that of the monks of Montecassino at Teano, where his compatriot, the defender of Formosus called Auxilius (a pseudonym meaning "defender"), was also protected. Sergius soon reversed his decree and summoned him to Rome for trial. Eugenius responded to the threat posed by this with a series of fawning verses of praise for Pope Sergius and the city of Rome, aurea Roma ("golden Rome"), to which the pope (he claimed) had brought renewed glory. He even went so far as to declare the pope's lover, Theodora, "full of virtue".

Eugenius composed three different pattern poems eulogising the Byzantine emperor Leo VI; one (no. XVI) is in the shape of a pyramid. He credits Leo with victories over barbarians in both Europe and Africa. Eugenius also praised Atenulf I of Benevento for his victories over the Saracens of the Garigliano. Among his other works are some glosses on Martianus Capella and a poem about nature, the arrival of springtime, and the hymn of the birds. Eugenius also produced metrical calendars.
