= Bishopric of Würzburg =

Bishopric of Würzburg may refer to:

- Diocese of Würzburg, spiritual jurisdiction of the bishops of Würzburg
- Prince-Bishopric of Würzburg, secular territory ruled by the bishops of Würzburg within the Holy Roman Empire
