= Adalgar =

Archbishop of Bremen from 888 to 909

Saint Adalgar

Archbishop of Bremen
- Died: 9 May 909; Bremen
- Venerated in: Roman Catholic Church, Eastern Orthodox Church
- Feast: 29 April

Adalgar (died 9 May 909), venerated as Saint Adalgar, was the third archbishop of Bremen from 888 until his death. Adalgar is revered as a saint in the Roman Catholic and Eastern Orthodox Churches. His feast day is 29 April.

== Life ==
When Rimbert was appointed in 865 to succeed Ansgar, the first archbishop of Hamburg, the abbot of the Benedictine abbey of Corvey gave him his brother, Adalgar, as a companion. The young Adalgar was then a deacon. Toward the end of Rimbert's life, he was consecrated bishop to assist the latter; and he succeeded him in the archbishopric on 11 June 888. During the latter half of his twenty years’ rule, age and infirmity made it necessary for him also to have a coadjutor in the person of Hoger, another monk of Corvey; and later five neighboring bishops were charged to assist the archbishop in his metropolitan duties.

Adalgar lived in troublous times. Although Arnulf's victory over the Normans (891) was a relief to his diocese, and although under Louis the Child (900-911) it suffered less from Hungarian onslaughts than the districts to the south and east of it, yet the general confusion restricted Adalgar's activity, and he was able to do very little in the northern kingdoms which were supposed to be part of his mission. There were also new contests over the relation of Bremen to the archiepiscopal see of Cologne.

Bremen had originally been under the jurisdiction of Cologne; but this relation was dissolved on the reestablishment of the archbishopric of Hamburg in 848; and Pope Nicholas I had confirmed the subordination of Bremen to Hamburg in 864. In 890 Archbishop Hermann of Cologne wrote to Pope Stephen V, demanding that the archbishop of Hamburg, as bishop of Bremen be subject to him.

The course of the controversy is somewhat obscure; but it is known that Stephen cited both contestants to Rome, and when Adalgar alone appeared, Hermann being represented by delegates with unsatisfactory credentials, the pope referred the matter to Archbishop Fulk of Reims, to decide in a synod at Worms. In the meantime, Stephen died; and his successor Formosus placed the investigation in the hands of a synod which met at Frankfurt in 892 under Hatto of Mainz. On the basis of its report, Formosus decided that Bremen should be united to Hamburg so long as the latter had no suffragan sees, but should revert to Cologne when any were erected, the archbishop of Hamburg meanwhile taking part in the provincial synods of Cologne, without thereby admitting his subordination.

Little is known of Adalgar's personality. From the way in which Rimbert's biographer and Adam of Bremen speak of him, he seems to have been a man of some force, but perhaps not strong enough for the difficult times in which his activity was cast.

== See also ==
- List of Catholic saints

== Literature ==
- Erhard Gorys: Lexikon der Heiligen. München Juni 2005, S. 17.
- Otto Heinrich May: Adalgar. In: Neue Deutsche Biographie (NDB). Band 1, Duncker & Humblot, Berlin 1953, ISBN 3-428-00182-6, S. 48 (Digitalisat).
- Adalgar. In: Heinrich August Pierer, Julius Löbe (Hrsg.): Universal-Lexikon der Gegenwart und Vergangenheit. 4. Auflage. Bd. 19, Altenburg 1865, S. 786 (online bei zeno.org).
- Friedrich Wilhelm Bautz: ADALGAR. In: Biographisch-Bibliographisches Kirchenlexikon (BBKL). Band 1, Bautz, Hamm 1975. 2., unveränderte Auflage Hamm 1990, ISBN 3-88309-013-1, Sp. 28.

Adalgar Born: unknown Died: 9 May 909 in Bremen
Catholic Church titles
Preceded by Rimbert	Archbishop of Bremen-Hamburg; 888–909	Succeeded by Huggar
