= Wu Renbi =

Late Tang dynasty Taoist and man of letters

- Traditional Chinese: 吳仁璧
- Simplified Chinese: 吴仁璧
Transcriptions
Standard Mandarin
- Hanyu Pinyin: Wú Rénbì

Wu Tingbao
- Traditional Chinese: 吳廷寳
- Simplified Chinese: 吴廷宝
Transcriptions
Standard Mandarin
- Hanyu Pinyin: Wú Tíngbǎo

Wu Renbi (died 901, courtesy name Tingbao) was a late Tang dynasty Taoist and man of letters. An eccentric man, Wu was eventually killed by the warlord Qian Liu for refusing to write the eulogy for Qian's mother Lady Shuiqiu. Eleven of his poems survived in the collection Quan Tangshi.

== Biography ==
Wu Renbi was originally from Sū Prefecture. He studied astrology and occult Taoism during his youth. At some point he allegedly studied after a Taoist master in Mount Lu for a few years. In 890, he passed the imperial examination with honors, but given the volatile political situation, with warlords overrunning the nation, he decided to enter the relatively stable territory of warlord Qian Liu in modern Zhejiang. With no money, he begged on the street, and soon Qian Liu heard of his fame and politely sought his service. Qian first asked Wu to interpret astrological signs; Wu said he did not know. Qian then asked Wu to serve in his retinue, and Wu refused again. In late 901, Qian Liu's mother Lady Shuiqiu died. After the funeral service, Qian asked Wu to write the eulogy to be inscribed on her tomb stele. Wu's denial this time incensed a grieving Qian Liu, who immediately ordered Wu Renbi to be thrown into the river and drowned.
