= Qian Kuan =

Father of warlord Qian Liu (c. 835-895)

Qian Kuan (錢寬)
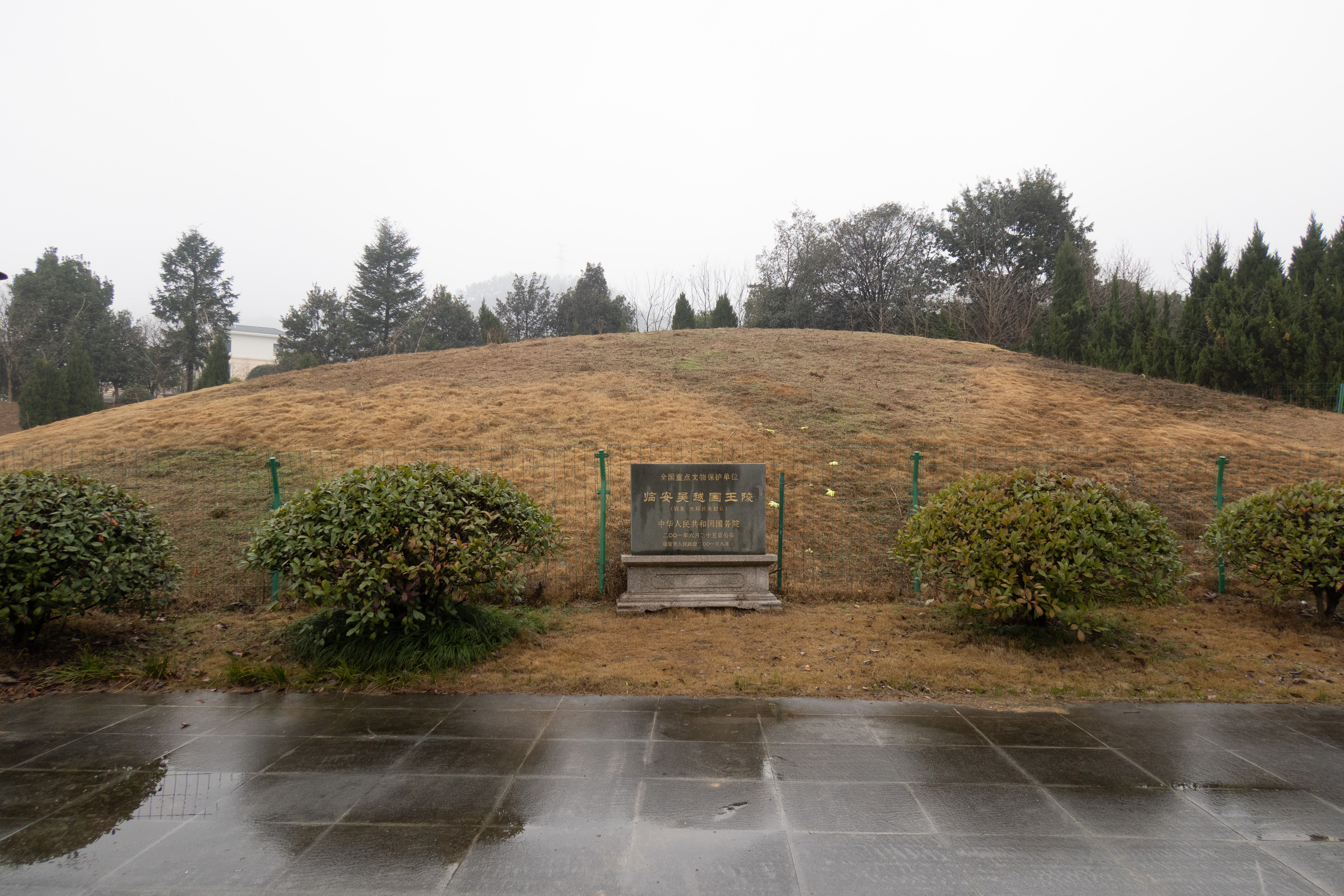
- Qian Kuan’s tomb
- Born: c. 835; Lin'an, Hang Prefecture, Tang
- Died: 16 May 895 (aged 59–60); Hang Prefecture, Tang
- Resting place: in modern Lin'an City
- Spouse: Lady Shuiqiu
- Children: Qian Liu; Qian Qi (錢錡); Qian Biao (錢鏢); Qian Duo (錢鐸); Qian Hua (錢鏵)
- Parents: Qian Zhou (錢宙) (father); Lady Shuiqiu (水丘) (mother)

Qian Kuan
- Traditional Chinese: 錢寬
- Simplified Chinese: 钱宽
Transcriptions
Standard Mandarin
- Hanyu Pinyin: Qián Kuān

Qian Hongdao
- Traditional Chinese: 錢弘道
- Simplified Chinese: 钱弘道
Transcriptions
Standard Mandarin
- Hanyu Pinyin: Qián Hóngdào

Qian Kuan (c. 835 – 16 May 895), courtesy name Hongdao, was the father of the warlord Qian Liu who founded the Wuyue kingdom.

Qian Kuan's tomb was discovered in October 1978 in Xishu Village (西墅村), Jinbei Subdistrict (锦北街道), Lin'an City, not far from his wife Lady Shuiqiu's tomb which was discovered 2 years later. Though it survived the Cultural Revolution, Qian Kuan's tomb had been robbed at some point in history.
