= Auxilius of Naples =

Auxilius of Naples (which has been considered a pseudonym (Note: According to Hefele.)) was an ecclesiastical writer. To him are attributed a series of writings (Note: Migne, Patrologia Latina, CXXIX, 1054 sqq.) that deal with the controversies concerning the succession and fate of Pope Formosus (891–896), and especially the validity of the orders conferred by him. Auxilius was a Frank, who was ordained a priest, or perhaps only a deacon, in Rome by Formosus, and lived later in southern Italy, apparently at Naples.

== Context ==
After the successor of Formosus, Pope Boniface VI, had ruled only fifteen days, Pope Stephen VI (properly VII), one of the adherents of the party of the Duke of Spoleto, was raised to the Papal Chair. Stephen not only abused the memory of Formosus but also treated his body with indignity.

Stephen was strangled in prison in the summer of 897, and the six following popes (to May 904) owed their elevation to the struggles of the political parties. Christophorus, the last of them, was overthrown by Pope Sergius III (May, 904-August, 911). Sergius had been a partisan of Stephen VI, and like the latter regarded the elevation of Formosus to the papacy as illegal and the orders conferred by him as null and void.

== Works ==
Auxilius was a follower of Formosus, and in several works composed about 908-911, he made a courageous and learned defence, both of Formosus and of the validity of his orders and those of his adherents. Morinus was the first to publish two of these writings in his "De ecclesiasticis ordinationibus" (Paris, 1665). They are entitled, "Libellus de ordinationibus a papâ Formoso factis", and "Tractatus qui Infensor et Defensor dicitur".

A third work of Auxilius, of similar import, was found by Mabillon and published by him under the title, "Libellus super causâ et negatio Formosi papæ", in his "Vetera Analecta". In his "Auxilius und Vulgarius", quoted below, Ernst Dümmler published from a Bamberg manuscript two further writings of Auxilius, one of which is known as "In defensionem sacræ ordinationis papæ Formosi libellus prior et posterior", while the other bears in the manuscript itself the title: "Libellus in defensionem Stephani episcopi et præfatæ ordinationis". (Stephen, Bishop of Naples had been consecrated by Pope Formosus.)

Still another treatise of an unknown author on behalf of Formosus, published by Bianchini in his edition of the Liber Pontificalis (1735, IV) is considered by Joseph Hergenröther (Note: Photius, II, 370, 373, note 9.) to be an extract from the writings of Auxilius, while Dümmler attributes it to Eugenius Vulgarius, an Italian priest and a defender of Formosus. Two other compositions of Eugenius Vulgarius are known: De causâ Formosianâ, and Eugenius Vulgarius Petro Diacono fratri et amico.

All these writings take the position that the orders conferred by sinful and excommunicated bishops are not in themselves invalid. In a necrology of the Abbey of Monte Cassino is noted on 25 January the death of an Auxilius, deacon and monk, author of a commentary on Genesis. (Note: Mai, Spicilegium Romanum, IX, Appendix; cf. Mabillon, Ann. Ord. S. Benedicti, III, 325.) This Auxilius may possibly be the author of the works described above.
