= Shōtai =

Period of Japanese history (898–901 CE)

Shōtai (昌泰) was a Japanese era name (年号, nengō, "year name") after Kanpyō and before Engi. This period spanned the years from April 898 to July 901. The reigning emperor was Daigo-tennō (醍醐天皇).

== Change of era ==
- January 26, 898 Shōtai gannen (昌泰元年): The new era name was created to mark an event or series of events. The previous era ended and the new one commenced in Ninna 5, on the 16th day of the 4th month of 898.

== Events of the Shōtai era ==
- December 7, 899 (Shōtai 2, 1st day of the 11th month): The sun entered into the winter solstice, and all the great officials of the empire presented themselves in Daigo's court.
- February 6, 900 (Shōtai 3, 3rd day of the 1st month): Daigo went to visit his father in the place Uda had chosen to live after the abdication.
- 900 (Shōtai 3, 10th month): The former-Emperor Uda traveled to Mount Kōya (高野山, , Kōya-san) in what is now Wakayama prefecture to the south of Osaka. He visited the temples on the slopes of the mountain.

== Notes ==
Preceded by Kanpyō	Era or nengō Shōtai; 898–901	Succeeded by Engi
