= Lady Shuiqiu =

Lady Shuiqiu (水丘)
- Born: c. 834; Lin'an, Hang Prefecture, Tang
- Died: 18 October 901 (aged 66–67); Hang Prefecture, Tang
- Resting place: Lin'an City
- Spouse: Qian Kuan
- Children: Qian Liu; Qian Qi (錢錡); Qian Biao (錢鏢); Qian Duo (錢鐸); Qian Hua (錢鏵)

Lady Shuiqiu (c. 834 – 901) was the wife of Qian Kuan and the mother of Qian Liu, a warlord who founded the Wuyue kingdom.

== Biography ==
Lady Shuiqiu was from the same clan as her husband Qian Kuan's mother. Her family had been poor. Qian Kuan died in 895, the same year their son Qian Liu was created a prince. In the following years Lady Shuiqiu successively received the following honors from the Tang dynasty court, all obviously through her son:

- "Dowager of Henan" (河南太君)
- "Dowager of Wuxing Commandery" (吳興郡太夫人)
- "Dowager of Qin Princedom" (秦國太夫人)

Qian Liu was said to be very devoted to his mother. When she was getting on in years and unable to climb the stairs, Qian would carry her on his back and climb up a tower in the palace garden to enjoy themselves. When Lady Shuiqiu died in 901, Qian Liu commissioned Wu Renbi to write her eulogy; Wu Renbi refused and was executed. After 908, Qian Liu succeeded in getting the Later Liang court (to whom he pledged allegiance) to posthumously honor his mother as the "Profound Dowager of Zhao Princedom" (趙國太玄夫人).

== Tomb ==
Lady Shuiqiu's tomb was discovered on 26 July 1980 in Xishu Village (西墅村), Jinbei Subdistrict (锦北街道), Lin'an City, not far from Qian Kuan's tomb which was discovered in 1978. An astronomical diagram was found on the ceiling of the tomb. Also discovered were oil lamps, celadon incense burners, bowls, plates, and wine flasks.
