= Engi (era) =

Period of Japanese history (901–923 CE)

Engi (延喜) was a Japanese era name (年号, nengō) after Shōtai and before Enchō. This period spanned the years from July 901 through April 923. The reigning emperor was Daigo-tennō (醍醐天皇).

== Change of era ==
- January 23, 901 Engi gannen (延喜元年): The new era name was created to mark an event or series of events. The previous era ended and the new one commenced in Shōtai 4, on the 15th day of the 7th month of 901.

== Events of the Engi era ==
- February 1, 901 (Engi 1, 1st day of the 1st month): There was a solar eclipse.
- 901 (Engi 1): The Sugawara no Michizane "incident" developed; but more details cannot be known, because Daigo ordered that diaries and records from this period should be burned.
- May 905 (Engi 5, 4th month): Ki no Tsurayuki presented the emperor with the compilation of the Kokin Wakashū, a collection of waka poetry.
- 909 (Engi 9, 4th month): The sadaijin Fujiwara no Tokihira died at the age of 39. He was honored with the posthumous title of regent.

== Notes ==
Preceded by Shōtai	Era or nengō Engi; 901–923	Succeeded by Enchō
