= Lei Man =

Lei Man (雷滿) (died 901), courtesy name Bingren (秉仁), was a warlord late in the Chinese Tang dynasty, who seized control of Lang Prefecture (朗州, in modern Changde, Hunan) in 881 and controlled it and the surrounding region (which was made into Wuzhen Circuit (武貞)) to accommodate him, who was made military governor (jiedushi) until his death in 901. He was known for devastating pillages of the surrounding circuits.

== Background and occupation of Lang Prefecture ==
It is not known when Lei Man was born, but it is known that he was of non-Han extraction, whose people lived in caves in the Wuling (武陵, in modern Changde, Hunan) region, in Lang Prefecture. During the time when the Tang general Gao Pian served as the military governor of Jingnan Circuit (荊南, headquartered in modern Jingzhou, Hubei), which Lang Prefecture belonged to then, Lei became an officer under Gao, commanding non-Han soldiers of the region. As Gao was later transferred to Zhenhai Circuit (鎮海, headquartered in modern Zhenjiang, Jiangsu), and then Huainan Circuit (淮南, headquartered in modern Yangzhou, Jiangsu), Lei followed him to those circuits along with his non-Han soldiers.

In 881, Lei, for reasons unclear, fled back from Huainan to his home region. He gathered 1,000 men and attacked Lang Prefecture, capturing it and killing its prefect Cui Zhu (崔翥). With the Tang imperial government then battling the major agrarian rebel Huang Chao, then-reigning Emperor Xizong made Lei the acting prefect. From this point on, Lei, in control of Lang Prefecture, would make periodic pillages, three or four times a year, against Jingnan's capital Jiangling Municipality. Lei's pillages appeared to briefly stop in 885, when then-military governor of Jingnan, Chen Ru, bribed him to stop the pillages, but after Chen was overthrown by Zhang Gui later that year, Lei appeared to continue his pillages. It was said that these pillages laid the region on the Yangtze River to waste.

In 893, Lei (who was by then referred to as full prefect of Lang), in an alliance with Deng Chune the prefect of Shao Prefecture (邵州, in modern Shaoyang, Hunan), attacked Tan Prefecture (in modern Changsha, Hunan), the capital of Wu'an Circuit (武安), killing Wu'an's military governor Zhou Yue (who was also from the Wuling tribes) and allowing Deng to take over as the military governor of Wu'an.

== As military governor ==
At some point, at Lei Man's request, Emperor Xizong's brother and successor Emperor Zhaozong carved Lang and neighboring Li Prefecture (澧州, in modern Changde) out of Jingnan Circuit and made it into a separate Wuzhen Circuit, commissioning Lei as its military governor. In 898, Emperor Zhaozong bestowed on Lei the honorary chancellor title of Tong Zhongshu Menxia Pingzhangshi (同中書門下平章事). It was said that whenever there were emissaries from the neighboring circuits who arrived at Wuzhen, Lei would hold feasts for them at a pavilion upon the water, stating, "Dragons and water monsters all dwell here, as this is where their government is." He would, during feasts, throw jewels into the water, and then strip naked and jump into the water to retrieve them; he would then put on his clothes back on and resume the feast, as if nothing had occurred. He also diverted the waters of Yuan River such that waters surrounded Lang Prefecture's main city, believing that this made the city uncapturable.

Lei Man died in 901 and was succeeded by his son Lei Yanwei.

== Notes and references ==
- New Book of Tang, vol. 186.
- History of the Five Dynasties, vol. 17.
- New History of the Five Dynasties, vol. 41.
- Zizhi Tongjian, vols. 254, 256, 259, 261, 262.
