= 735 Vayots Dzor Province earthquake =

8th-century Armenian earthquake

Coordinates: 39.750°N 45.500°E

The 735 Vayots Dzor Province earthquake affected the Vayots Dzor Province on 3 July 735 AD.

The earthquake reportedly destroyed an entire valley. The reported casualties included at least 10,000 victims. The Armenian sources report that the earthquake caused the collapse of buildings, several landslides, and changes to the area's water supply network. The earliest surviving primary source on the earthquake is the chronicle of Movses Kaghankatvatsi (10th century). He reports that the earthquake was accompanied by "an impenetrable darkness" over the borders of Mozu. According to his narrative the earth kept shaking for 40 days, and nearly 10,000 people were "swallowed up". According to Movses, the earthquake caused the area to be named "Vayots Dzor", which he translates as the "valley of woe".

A more detailed account is given by the historian Stephen Orbelian (13th century). He viewed the earthquake as a divine punishment. He reports a thick darkness covering the region for 40 days, but a single, powerful and destructive earthquake. The upheaval of the earth reportedly caused widespread damage, from the depth of the abysses to the great heights of the region. He compares the heaving of the earth to the sea waves. He reports the collapse of mountains, the complete crumbling of rocks. Common houses and fine palaces alike were turned to tombs for their residents. Springs and rivers dried up. Sounds similar to human voices were heard from the depths, reportedly speaking of the valley of woe. He estimates that the known 10,000 victims were registered taxpayers. He reported that nobody knew how many unregistered people perished in the earthquake.

Kirakos Gandzaketsi (13th century) gives an abbreviated account of Orbelian's narrative. An Armenian synaxarium dating to c.767-769 briefly mentions the earthquake.

Soviet sources report that traces of the event were confirmed by geomorphological analyses and examination of the region by aerial photography. The valley of Vayots Dzor includes a number of monastic settlements, none of which predates the 9th century. There has been no archaeological excavation of the region. It is assumed that the earthquake destroyed local religious centers, which were later rebuilt. There is no specific mention of destroyed villages.

The placename "Mozu" is not attested in other sources. While the Armenian sources attribute the name Vayots Dzor to this earthquake, the toponym already appears in a 7th-century geographic text. It is unclear whether this early reference is a later-day gloss in the text or was part of the original work.

== Sources ==
- Guidoboni, Emanuela; Traina, Giusto (1995), A new catalogue of earthquakes in the historical Armenian area from antiquity to the 12th century, Annals of Geophysics
