= 940s =

Decade

The 940s decade ran from January 1, 940, to December 31, 949.

== Events ==
=== 940 ===
==== By place ====
====== Europe ======
- The tribe of the Polans begins the construction of the following fortified settlements (Giecz, Bnin, Ląd, Gniezno, Poznań, Grzybowo and Ostrów Lednicki) in Greater Poland. The Piast Dynasty under Duke Siemomysł gains control over other groups of Polans along the Upper Vistula, and establishes their rule around Giecz (approximate date).

====== Japan ======
- March 25 – Taira no Masakado, the self-proclaimed "New Emperor" (新皇), is subdued by local rivals who revolt against his rule. His forces are defeated by his cousin, Taira no Sadamori, in Shimōsa Province. Masakado's head is brought back to Emperor Suzaku in Tokyo.

==== By topic ====
====== Literature ======
- Saadia Gaon, a Jewish rabbi and philosopher, compiles his Siddur (Jewish prayer book) in Arabic and synagogal poetry in modern-day Iraq (approximate date).

====== Religion ======
- Narita-san ("New victory temple"), a Shingon Buddhist temple, is founded in Chiba (Japan).

=== 941 ===
==== By place ====
====== Byzantine Empire ======
- May – September – Rus'–Byzantine War: The Rus' and their allies, the Pechenegs, under the Varangian prince Igor I of Kiev, cross the Black Sea with an invasion fleet of 1,000 ships (40,000 men) and disembark on the northern coast of Asia Minor. While the Byzantine fleet is engaged against the Arabs in the Mediterranean, the Rus' forces reach the gates of Constantinople. Emperor Romanos I organizes the defense of the capital and assembles 15 old ships (equipped with throwers of Greek fire) under the chamberlain (protovestiarios) Theophanes. The Byzantines repel the Rus' fleet (nearly annihilating the entire fleet) but can not prevent the invaders from pillaging the hinterland of Constantinople, venturing as far south as Nicomedia (modern-day İzmit). In September, John Kourkouas and Bardas Phokas ("the Elder"), two leading generals, destroy the Rus' forces in Thrace. Igor manages, with only a handful of boats, to escape to the Caspian Sea.

====== Europe ======
- Spring – Henry I, duke of Bavaria, plots to assassinate his brother, King Otto I, at the royal palace in Quedlinburg (modern Saxony-Anhalt), but the conspiracy is discovered and Henry is put in captivity in Ingelheim. He is released after doing penance at Christmas.
- Fall – Hugh of Provence, king of Italy, leads a fourth expedition to Rome to dislodge Alberic II. He proceeds to Lazio, preparing a campaign to capture the papal capital. Again the attacks fail and Hugh retreats to Milan.
- Olaf Guthfrithson, a Norse-Irish chieftain, is killed while raiding an ancient Anglian church at Tyninghame (Northern Northumbria). He is succeeded by his cousin Olaf Sigtryggsson as ruler of Jórvik (modern Yorkshire).

====== Middle East ======
- March 9 – The famed Green Dome of the Palace of the Golden Gate at Baghdad collapses, amidst heavy rainfall.

==== By topic ====
====== Religion ======
- Oda ("the Good") is appointed archbishop of Canterbury in England after the death of Wulfhelm.
- Kaminarimon, the eight-pillared gate to the Sensō-ji Buddhist temple in Tokyo, Japan, is erected.

=== 942 ===
==== By place ====
====== Europe ======
- Summer – The Hungarians invade Al-Andalus (modern Spain) and besiege the fortress city of Lerida. They devastate Cerdanya and Huesca, and capture Yahya ibn Muhammad ibn al Tawil, Umayyad governor (wali) of the town of Barbastro. Lacking food stores and sufficient forage, the Hungarians retreat to the Gothic March.
- Battle of Fraxinet: King Hugh of Provence launches an attack on Fraxinet, the Moorish fortress on the Côté d'Azur that had taken control of the Piedmontese valleys. With the assistance of a Byzantine fleet sent by Emperor Romanos I, Hugh lays siege to the Moorish fortress with the help of Hungarian auxiliary troops (Kabars).
- Fall – Hugh of Provence makes a truce with the Moors of Fraxinet, after hearing the news that a Swabian army is about to descend on Italy. He allows the Moors to attack the Alpine passes for his own political ends in his struggle with Berengar of Ivrea. The Byzantines cry foul and end their alliance with Hugh.
- December 17 – William I ("Longsword"), duke of Normandy, is ambushed and assassinated by supporters of Arnulf I ("the Great"), count of Flanders, while the two are at a peace conference at Picquigny (on an island on the Somme) to settle their differences. William is succeeded by his 9-year-old son Richard.
- Winter – The Hungarians raid Friuli and descend into central Italy. Hugh of Provence grants them a large sum of tribute if they return to the Gothic March or Spain. The Hungarians refuse the offer and raid the countryside of Lazio, destroying the region of Sabina.

====== England ======
- King Edmund I moves with his army north to reconquer the Five Boroughs (the five main towns of Danish Mercia) in modern-day East Midlands from the Norse-Irish king Olaf Sigtryggsson.
- Idwal Foel, king of Gwynedd, openly rebels against the overlordship of Edmund I. He and Llywelyn ap Merfyn, king of Pows, are killed fighting the English forces.
- Hywel Dda, king of Deheubarth, annexes Gwynedd and Powys, to become the sole ruler of most of Wales.

====== Asia ======
- Mularaja, founder of the Chaulukya Dynasty, supplants the last Chavda ruler, Samanta-Simha, in Gujarat (modern India). He founds an independent kingdom with his capital in Anahilapataka (approximate date).

==== By topic ====
====== Religion ======
- Fall – Pope Stephen VIII tries to negotiate a peace that will end the feud between Alberic II, de facto ruler of Rome, and Hugh of Provence (his stepfather) but he dies after a 3-year reign. Stephen is succeeded by Marinus II as the 128th pope of the Catholic Church.

=== 943 ===
==== By place ====
====== Byzantine Empire ======
- Spring – Allied with the Rus', a Hungarian army raids Moesia and Thrace. Emperor Romanos I buys peace, and accepts to pay a yearly tribute (protection money) to the Hungarians. His frontiers now 'protected' on the Balkan Peninsula, Romanos sends a Byzantine expeditionary force (80,000 men) led by general John Kourkouas (his commander-in-chief) to invade northern Mesopotamia (modern Iraq).

====== Europe ======
- Caspian expeditions of the Rus': The Rus' under the Varangian prince Igor I of Kiev sail up the Kura River, deep into the Caucasus, and defeat the forces of the Sallarid ruler Marzuban ibn Muhammad. They capture the fortress city of Barda (modern Azerbaijan).
- Battle of Wels: A joint Bavarian–Carantanian army led by Bertold (duke of Bavaria) defeats the Hungarians near Wels (Upper Austria), who are attacked at a crossing of the Enns River at Ennsburg.

====== England ======
- King Edmund I ravages Strathclyde and defeats the Scottish king Constantine II, who has reigned as king of Alba since 900. Constantine, ruler of the 'Picts and Scots', abdicates to enter a monastery and yields control of his realm to his cousin Malcolm I.
- The Trinity Bridge at Crowland, Lincolnshire is described, in the 'Charter of Eadred'.

=== 944 ===
==== By place ====
====== Byzantine Empire ======
- Arab–Byzantine War: Byzantine forces are defeated by Sayf al-Dawla. He captures the city of Aleppo, and extends his control over the Al-Jazira–Upper Mesopotamia region. Al-Dawla's rule is recognized by the Ikhshidids. With the recovery of Edessa, the Greeks also obtain the fabled Image of Edessa.
- August 15 – The "Holy Mandylion" (a cloth with the face of Jesus) is conveyed to Constantinople, where it arrives on the feast of the Dormition of the Theotokos. A triumphal entry is staged for the relic in the capital.
- December 16 – Emperor Romanos I is arrested and deposed after a 14-year reign by his own sons, the co-emperors Stephen and Constantine. He is carried off to the Prince Islands and forced to become a monk.

====== Europe ======
- King Hugh of Provence dispatches an embassy to King Otto I of the East Frankish Kingdom, offering a large sum of cash if he promises not to provide assistance to Berengar of Ivrea. Otto refuses this offer.
- Raymond III (or Pons I), count of Toulouse, travels to Nevers (southeast of Paris) to declare his fidelity to king Louis IV ("d'Outremer"). He is granted the title 'prince of the Aquitanians' by the king.
- The largest recorded epidemic of ergotism, also known as "Saint Anthony's Fire, kills 40,000 people in France.

====== England ======
- King Edmund I regains (with the help of Danish settlers) the territory he ceded to Olaf Guthfrithson. He conquers Northumbria and cedes Cumberland to Malcolm I, king of the 'Picts and Scots'.
- A great storm sweeps across Wessex and many houses are destroyed, 1,500 in London alone (a significant proportion of the town).

====== Africa ======
- Abu Yazid, a Kharijite Berber leader, launches a rebellion in the Aurès Mountains (modern Algeria) against the Fatamids, seeking aid from the Caliphate of Córdoba in Al-Andalus.
- The cities of Algiers and Miliana are re-founded by the Zirid ruler (emir) Buluggin ibn Ziri.

==== By topic ====
====== Religion ======
- The Al-Askari Mosque is built in Samarra (modern Iraq).

=== 945 ===
==== By place ====
====== Byzantine Empire ======
- January 27 – The co-emperors Stephen and Constantine are overthrown barely a month after deposing their father, Romanos I. With the help of his wife, Constantine VII becomes sole emperor of the Byzantine Empire. He appoints to the highest army commands four members of the Phokas family, which have been in disgrace under Romanos.
- Constantine VII concludes a Rus'–Byzantine treaty in which Rus' merchants are to conduct their trade in Constantinople. While many Rus' make their fortunes in trade with the Arab Muslims, the Rurik Dynasty of Kyiv grows rich from Byzantine commerce.

====== Europe ======
- Spring – Berengar of Ivrea invades Italy with hired Lombard troops and takes up residence in Milan. Berengar proceeds to Verona, where he is joined by forces of Count Milo and other partisans.
- King Hugh of Provence lays siege to Vignola to put an end to Berengar's advance. But to no avail, as Berengar of Ivrea is hailed throughout northern Italy as a liberator, and Hugh flees to Provence.
- April 13 – Hugh of Provence abdicates the throne in favor of his son Lothair II (who has been co-ruler since 931) and is acclaimed as sole king of Lombardia. Hugh is allowed to retire in Pavia.
- Igor I, ruler of the Kievan Rus', is killed while collecting tribute from the Drevlians and is succeeded by his three-year-old son Sviatoslav I. His mother Olga becomes regent and the official ruler.
- Summer – King Louis IV ("d'Outremer") is captured by the Normans and handed over to Hugh the Great. In return for the release of Louis, Laon surrenders to him in compensation.
- Caliph Abd-al-Rahman III occupies the palace of Medina Azahara (called "the shining city") as the new capital of the Caliphate of Córdoba (modern Spain).

====== England ======
- King Edmund I conquers Strathclyde, forms an alliance with Malcolm I (king of the 'Picts and Scots') and cedes Cumberland and Westmorland to him.
- King Hywel Dda ("the Good") convenes a conference at Whitland, which draws up a standardized code of laws in Wales (approximate date).

====== Arabian Empire ======
- Summer – Sayf al-Dawla is defeated by Muslim forces under Muhammad ibn Tughj al-Ikhshid near Qinnasrin. He is forced to abandon his Syrian domains and flees to Raqqa. In October the two men come to an agreement, which recognizes Hamdanid rule over northern Syria, founding the Emirate of Aleppo.
- Winter – Muslim forces under Nasir al-Dawla capture Baghdad and restore Caliph Al-Muttaqi to power again. Al-Dawla establishes himself as amir al-umara, or de facto regent of the Abbasid Caliphate.

====== China ======
- Autumn – The Min Kingdom is destroyed by the Southern Tang. Emperor Yuan Zong expands its domains beyond those of the former Wu Kingdom. He annexes Min territory into its own boundaries.

==== By topic ====
====== Religion ======
- Dunstan becomes abbot of Glastonbury Abbey in England. He re-creates monastic life by establishing Benedictine monasticism in the monastery.

=== 946 ===
==== By place ====
====== Europe ======
- Summer – King Otto I invades the West Frankish Kingdom with an expeditionary force, but his armies are not strong enough to take the key cities of Laon, Reims and Paris. After three months, Otto ends his campaign without defeating his rival Hugh the Great. He manages to depose Hugh of Vermandois from his position as archbishop of Reims, restoring Artald of Reims to his former office.

====== England ======
- May 26 – King Edmund I is murdered at age 25 by an outlawed robber while attending St. Augustine's Day mass in Pucklechurch (Gloucestershire). He is succeeded by his brother Eadred (or Edred) as king of England.

====== Arabian Empire ======
- January 28 – Caliph Al-Mustakfi is blinded and deposed by Emir Mu'izz al-Dawla, ruler of the Buyid Empire. He is succeeded by Al-Muti and becomes only a figurehead (with the Buyid Dynasty as dominate rule) of the once-powerful Abbasid Caliphate while he tries to restore peace.
- Battle of Baghdad: Along the banks of the Tigris, Buyid forces under Mu'izz al-Dawla defeat the Hamdanids for control of the city. They are forced to pay tax revenues and agree to recognize Al-Muti as the legitimate caliph.

====== Japan ======
- May 16 – Emperor Suzaku abdicates the throne after a 16-year reign. He is succeeded by his brother Murakami, who becomes the 62nd emperor of Japan.

==== By topic ====
====== Religion ======
- Summer – Pope Marinus II dies at Rome after a four-year reign. He is succeeded by Agapetus II and elected with the support of the Roman despot Alberic II. Agapetus is installed as the 129th pope of the Catholic Church.

====== Volcanology ======
- Super-colossal (VEI-7) 946 AD Eruption of Paektu Mountain on the modern North Korea-China border the eruption was one of the most violent in the past 10,000 years along with KO eruption in 8th Millennium BC, The Crater lake's eruption in 7th Millennium BC, The Kikai caldera's Akahoya eruption in 5th Millennium BC, The Thera or Santorini's eruption in 2nd Millennium BC, The Lake Taupo's Hatepe eruption, The Lake Ilopango's eruption in around 535 and 536, The 1257 eruption of Mount Samalas, The mystery eruption in 1453, and the 1815 Tambora eruption.

=== 947 ===
==== By place ====
====== Europe ======
- Summer – A Hungarian army led by Grand Prince Taksony campaigns in Italy, heading southwards on the eastern shore of the peninsula. It besieges Larino and reaches Otranto, plundering Apulia for three months. Berengar of Ivrea negotiates a truce and offers them a massive tribute (for which he imposes a special tax).
- Winter – King Otto I cedes the Duchy of Bavaria to his brother Henry I. To secure his rule, Henry is married to Judith, a daughter of Arnulf I ("the Bad"), and appoints a series of counts palatine.

====== England ======
- Horsham, a market town on the upper reaches of the Aran River in West Sussex, is first mentioned in 'King Eadred's land charter' (see History of Horsham).

====== Arabian Empire ======
- August 19 – Abu Yazid, a Kharijite Berber leader who has led a rebellion against the Fatimid Caliphate in Ifriqiya, is defeated in the Hodna Mountains (modern-day Algeria). Caliph al-Mansur bi-Nasr Allah sets about restoring the Fatimid dominion over North Africa.

====== China ======
- January 11 – Emperor Tai Zong of the Khitan-led Liao Dynasty invades the Later Jin (Five Dynasties), resulting in the destruction of the Later Jin. Khitan forces head southwards to the Yellow River, but must return to their base in present-day Beijing in May after Tai Zong dies of an illness.
- March 10 – The Later Han is founded by Liu Zhiyuan, the military governor (jiedushi) of Bingzhou. He declares himself emperor (formally called Gaozu) and establishes the capital in Bian, present-day Kaifeng.

==== By topic ====
====== Literature ======
- Al-Masudi, an Arab historian and geographer, completes his large-scale work The Meadows of Gold and Mines of Gems, a historical book about the beginning of the world, starting with Adam and Eve.

=== 948 ===
==== By place ====
====== Byzantine Empire ======
- Arab–Byzantine War: Hamdanid forces under Sayf al-Dawla raid into Asia Minor. The Byzantines respond with reprisals led by Leo Phokas the Younger, taking captives and razing the walls of Hadath (modern Turkey).

====== Europe ======
- Two Hungarian armies invade Bavaria and Carinthia. One of them is defeated at Flozzun in the Nordgau by Henry I, duke of Bavaria.
- King Otto I appoints his son Liudolf as duke of Swabia, consolidating Ottonian dominance in Southern Germany.
- Sunifred II of Urgell dies without descendants and is succeeded by his nephew Borrell II, count of Barcelona.

====== England ======
- King Eadred ravages Northumbria and burns down St. Wilfrid's church at Ripon. On his way home, he sustains heavy losses at Castleford. Eadred manages to check his rivals, and the Northumbrians are forced to pay him compensation.
- St. Albans School is founded in Hertfordshire.

====== Africa ======
- Spring – Fatimid forces under al-Hasan ibn Ali al-Kalbi suppress the rebellion in Palermo and swiftly seize the island. Caliph al-Mansur bi-Nasr Allah appoints Ali al-Kalbi as emir of Sicily, beginning the rule of the Kalbid dynasty.
- The Kingdom of Nri (modern Nigeria) is founded by the priest-king Eri (until 1041).

====== China ======
- February 12 – King Qian Hongzong is deposed by general Hu Jinsi during a coup. He establishes his younger brother Qian Chu as ruler of Wuyue.

==== By topic ====
====== Literature ======
- Minamoto no Kintada, a Japanese official and waka poet, dies. He is a respected nobleman at the imperial court and a member of the Thirty-Six Immortals of Poetry.

====== Religion ======
- Otto I establishes the missionary dioceses of Brandenburg and Havelberg in the territory of the Marca Geronis (Saxon Eastern March).
- The Nallur Kandaswamy temple, one of the most significant Hindu temples in the Jaffna District (modern Sri Lanka), is built.
- St Albans School in Hertfordshire is founded by Wulsin, an abbot of St Alban's Abbey, England.

=== 949 ===
==== By place ====
====== Byzantine Empire ======
- Arab-Byzantine War: Hamdanid forces under Sayf al-Dawla raid into the theme of Lykandos, but are defeated. The Byzantines counter-attack and seize Germanikeia, defeating an army from Tarsus, and raiding as far south as Antioch. General (strategos) Theophilos Kourkouas captures Theodosiopolis (modern-day Erzurum) after a 7-month siege.

====== Europe ======
- A Byzantine expeditionary force under Constantine Gongyles attempts to re-conquer the Emirate of Crete from the Saracens. The expedition ends in a disastrous failure; the Byzantine camp is destroyed in a surprise attack. Gongyles himself barely escapes on his flagship.
- Abd al-Rahman III the Caliph of Córdoba declares Jihad, preparing a large army & conquers the city of Lugo in the extreme North of Iberia. This raid shows to be one of the furthest raids Muslims in Spain ever conducted, done as a show of strength of the Muslim State in Al-Andalus.
- King Miroslav (or Miroslaus) is killed by Ban Pribina during a civil war started by his younger brother Michael Krešimir II, who succeeds him as ruler of Croatia.
- Summer – The Hungarians defeat a Bavarian army at Laa (modern Austria).

====== Japan ======
- September 14 – Fujiwara no Tadahira, a politician and chancellor (kampaku), dies at his native Kyoto. Having governed Japan as regent under Emperor Suzaku since 930. The Fujiwara clan will continue to hold the regency until 1180, controlling the imperial government.

== Significant people ==
- Al-Radi Abbasid caliph
- Abd al-Rahman III caliph of Córdoba
- Constantine VII of Byzantium
- Al-Muttaqi caliph of Baghdad
- Al-Mustakfi caliph of Baghdad
- Al-Qa'im of Fatimid dynasty
- Al-Mansur bi-Nasr Allah of Fatimid dynasty
- Al-Muti caliph of Baghdad

== Births ==
940

- June 10 – Abu al-Wafa' Buzjani, Persian mathematician and astronomer (d. 998)
- Abdollah ibn Bukhtishu, Syrian physician and scientist (d. 1058)
- Abu-Mahmud Khojandi, Persian astronomer and mathematician (d. 1000)
- Abū Sahl al-Qūhī, Persian mathematician and physicist (approximate date)
- Adelaide-Blanche of Anjou, French queen and regent (d. 1026)
- Al-Baqillani, Muslim theologian and jurist (approximate date)
- Baldwin III ("the Young"), Frankish nobleman (approximate date)
- Chavundaraya, Indian general, architect and poet (d. 989)
- Damian Dalassenos, Byzantine governor (approximate date)
- Eadwig ("the All-Fair"), king of England (approximate date)
- Ferdowsi, Persian poet and author (approximate date)
- George El Mozahem, Egyptian martyr and saint (d. 969)
- Géza, Grand Prince of the Hungarians (approximate date)
- Guy (or Guido), margrave of Ivrea (Piedmont) (d. 965)
- Henry III ("the Younger"), duke of Bavaria (approximate date)
- Leopold I, margrave of Austria (approximate date)
- Lothair I, margrave of the Nordmark (approximate date)
- Notker of Liège, French bishop and prince-bishop (d. 1008)
- Sulayman al-Ghazzi, Arab poet and bishop of Gaza (approximate date)
- Subh of Córdoba, mother and regent of Hisham II (approximate date)
- Thorgeir Ljosvetningagodi, Icelandic lawspeaker (approximate date)
- Vijayanandi, Indian mathematician and astronomer (approximate date)
- Willigis, German archchancellor and archbishop (approximate date)
- Wulfhilda of Barking, English nun and abbess (approximate date)

941

- Brian Boru, High King of Ireland (approximate date) (d. 1014)
- Hugh Capet, first of the Capetian Kings of France (d. 996)
- Ibn Furak, Muslim imam, jurist and theologian (d. 1015)
- Lê Hoàn, emperor of the Early Lê Dynasty (Vietnam) (d.1005)
- Lothair III, king of the West Frankish Kingdom (d. 986)

942

- March 7 – Mu'ayyad al-Dawla, ruler of the Buyid Dynasty (d. 983)
- Fujiwara no Tamemitsu, Japanese statesman (d. 992)
- Genshin, Japanese Tendai scholar (d. 1017)
- Liu Chang, emperor of Southern Han (d. 980)
- Sabuktigin, emir of Ghazna (approximate date)
- Sabur ibn Ardashir, Persian statesman (d. 1025)
- Sŏ Hŭi, Korean politician and diplomat (d. 998)
- Sviatoslav I, Grand Prince of Kiev (approximate date)
- Wang, empress of the Song Dynasty (d. 963)

943

- Dayang Jingxuan, Chinese Zen Buddhist monk (d. 1027)
- Edgar I (the Peaceful), king of England (approximate date)
- Emma of Paris, duchess consort of Normandy (d. 968)
- Ibn Zur'a, Abbasid physician and philosopher (d. 1008)
- Matilda, queen consort of Burgundy (approximate date)

944

- Abd al-Malik I, Samanid emir (d. 961)
- Al-Mu'ayyad Ahmad, Muslim imam (d. 1020)
- Fujiwara no Akimitsu, Japanese bureaucrat (d. 1021)
- Fujiwara no Sukemasa, Japanese statesman (d. 998)
- Ibn Juljul, Muslim physician (approximate date)
- John VIII bar Abdoun, patriarch of Antioch (d. 1033)
- Otto (or Odo), duke of Burgundy (d. 965)

945

- Abbo of Fleury, French monk and abbot (approximate date)
- Adelaide of Aquitaine, French queen consort (or 952)
- Al-Muqaddasi, Arab Muslim geographer (approximate date)
- Al-Sijzi, Persian astronomer and mathematician (d. 1020)
- Eric the Victorious, king of Sweden (approximate date)
- Judah ben David Hayyuj, Jewish linguist (approximate date)
- Tróndur í Gøtu, Viking chieftain (approximate date)

946

- Henry I, duke of Burgundy (d. 1002)
- Henry II ("the Good"), count of Stade (d. 1016)
- Approximate date
  - Sylvester II, pope of the Catholic Church (d. 1003)
  - Theodora, Byzantine empress consort

947

- Al-Qadir, Abbasid caliph of Baghdad (d. 1031)
- Fujiwara no Koshi, Japanese empress (d. 979)
- Raja Raja Chola I, king of Chola Kingdom (d. 1014)

948

- September 1 – Jing Zong, emperor of the Liao Dynasty (d. 982)
- December 22 – Kang Kam-ch'an, Korean official and general (d. 1031)
- Al-Shaykh Al-Mufid, Twelver Shia theologian (approximate date)
- Baba Kuhi of Shiraz, Persian Sufi mystic and writer (d. 1037)
- Emma of Italy, queen of the West Frankish Kingdom (approximate date)
- Minamoto no Yorimitsu, Japanese nobleman (d. 1021)

949

- Fujiwara no Nagatō, Japanese bureaucrat and poet (d. 1009)
- Gebhard of Constance, German bishop (d. 995)
- Máel Sechnaill mac Domnaill, High King of Ireland (d. 1022)
- Mathilde, German abbess and granddaughter of Otto I (d. 1011)
- Ranna, Kannada poet (India) (approximate date)
- Symeon (the New Theologian), Byzantine monk and poet (d. 1022)
- Uma no Naishi, Japanese nobleman and waka poet (d. 1011)

== Deaths ==
940

- March 25 – Taira no Masakado, Japanese nobleman and samurai
- May 12 – Eutychius, patriarch of Alexandria (b. 877)
- June 7 – Qian Hongzun, heir apparent of Wuyue (b. 925)
- July 4 – Wang Jianli, Chinese general (b. 871)
- July 20 – Ibn Muqla, Abbasid vizier and calligrapher
- August 5 – Li Decheng, Chinese general (b. 863)
- September 30 – Fan Yanguang, Chinese general
- November 8 – Yao Yi, Chinese chancellor (b. 866)
- November 14 – Abu'l-Fadl al-Bal'ami, Samanid vizier
- December 23 – Ar-Radi, Abbasid caliph (b. 909)
- December 25 – Makan ibn Kaki, Daylamite warlord
- Atenulf II, prince of Benevento and Capua (Italy)
- Faelan mac Muiredach, king of Leinster (Ireland)
- Ibn Abd Rabbih, Moorish writer and poet (b. 860)
- Rajyapala, emperor of the Pala Dynasty (Bengal)
- Yang Lian, crown prince of Wu (Ten Kingdoms)
- Zhao Guangyi, Chinese official and chancellor

941

- January 5 – Zhang Yanhan, Chinese chancellor (b. 884)
- February 12 – Wulfhelm, archbishop of Canterbury
- April 21 – Bajkam, Turkish military commander
- Abu Bakr Muhammad, Muslim governor
- Fujiwara no Sumitomo, Japanese nobleman
- Gurgen II, prince of Tao-Klarjeti (Georgia)
- Jayavarman IV, Angkorian king (Cambodia)
- Muhammad ibn Ya'qub al-Kulayni, Persian scholar (b. 864)
- Olaf Guthfrithson, Viking leader and king
- Órlaith íngen Cennétig, Irish queen
- Qian Yuanguan, king of Wuyue (b. 887)
- Rudaki ("Adam of Poets"), Persian poet (b. 858)
- Wang Dingbao, Chinese chancellor (b. 870)
- Zhao Sun, Chinese official and chancellor

942

- January 21 – An Chongrong, Chinese general (Five Dynasties)
- February 13 – Muhammad ibn Ra'iq, Abbasid de facto regent
- June 10 – Liu Yan, emperor of Southern Han (b. 889)
- July 28 – Shi Jingtang, emperor of Later Jin (b. 892)
- August 24 – Liu, empress dowager of Later Jin
- November 18 – Odo of Cluny, Frankish abbot
- December 17 – William I, duke of Normandy (b.c. 893)
- An Congjin, Chinese general and governor
- Fulk I, Frankish nobleman (approximate date)
- Idwal Foel, king of Gwynedd (Wales)
- Llywelyn ap Merfyn, king of Powys (Wales)
- Pietro Participazio, doge of Venice (Italy)
- Saadia Gaon, Jewish philosopher and exegete
- Stephen VIII, pope of the Catholic Church
- Theobald the Elder, Frankish nobleman (b. 854)
- Wigred, bishop of Chester-le-Street (approximate date)
- Wynsige, bishop of Dorchester (approximate date)

943

- February 23
  - David I, prince of Tao-Klarjeti (Georgia)
  - Herbert II, Frankish nobleman
- February 26 – Muirchertach mac Néill, king of Ailech (Ireland)
- March 16 – Pi Guangye, chancellor of Wuyue (b. 877)
- March 30 – Li Bian, emperor of Southern Tang (b. 889)
- April 6
  - Liu Churang, Chinese general (b. 881)
  - Nasr II, Samanid emir (b. 906)
- April 10 – Landulf I, prince of Benevento and Capua (Italy)
- April 15 – Liu Bin, emperor of Southern Han (b. 920)
- April 18 – Fujiwara no Atsutada, Japanese nobleman (b. 906)
- July 4 – Wang Kon, founder of Goryeo (Korea) (b. 877)
- July 26 – Motoyoshi, Japanese nobleman and poet (b. 890)
- November 8 – Liu, empress of Qi (Ten Kingdoms) (b. 877)
- Cao Zhongda, official and chancellor of Wuyue (b. 882)
- Gagik I of Vaspurakan, Armenian king (or 936)
- Liu Honggao, chancellor of Southern Han (b. 923)
- Sinan ibn Thabit, Persian physician (b. 880)
- Urchadh mac Murchadh, king of Maigh Seóla (Ireland)
- Xu Jie, Chinese officer and chancellor (b. 868)
- Zhang Yuxian, Chinese rebel leader (approximate date)

944

- February 25 – Lin Ding, Chinese official and chancellor
- April 8 – Wang Yanxi, emperor of Min (Ten Kingdoms)
- April 23 – Wichmann the Elder, Frankish nobleman
- Abu Mansur al-Maturidi, Muslim theologian (b. 853)
- Abu Tahir al-Jannabi, Qarmatian ruler (b. 906)
- Choe Eon-wui, Korean minister and calligrapher (b. 868)
- Donnchad Donn, High King of Ireland
- Duan Siping, ruler of Dali (approximate date)
- Fang Gao, Chinese official and chief of staff
- Flaithbertach mac Inmainén, Irish abbot
- Harshavarman II, Angkorian king
- Li, empress of Min (Ten Kingdoms)
- Liu Hongchang, Chinese chancellor
- Mahipala I, Gurjara-Pratihara king
- Ngo Quyen, Vietnamese king
- Wang Yacheng, Chinese prince

945

- January 21 – Yang Tan, Chinese general and governor
- February 14
  - Lian Chongyu, Chinese general
  - Zhu Wenjin, emperor of Min (Ten Kingdoms)
- June 30 – Ki no Tsurayuki, Japanese writer and poet (b. 872)
- July 4 – Zhuo Yanming, Chinese Buddhist monk and emperor
- October 23 – Hyejong, king of Goryeo (Korea) (b. 912)
- Abu Muhammad al-Hasan, Arab Muslim geographer (b. 893)
- Adarnase II, prince of Tao-Klarjeti (Georgia)
- Bagrat I, prince of Tao-Klarjeti (Georgia)
- Fujiwara no Nakahira, Japanese statesman (b. 875)
- Igor I, Varangian ruler of Kievan Rus'
- Krešimir I, king of Croatian Kingdom
- Song Fujin, empress and wife of Li Bian
- Tuzun, Abbasid general and de facto ruler
- Wang Jichang, Chinese general and chancellor
- Yang Sigong, Chinese official and chancellor
- Zhang Gongduo, Chinese general and official

946

- January 26 – Eadgyth, queen consort of Germany (b. 910)
- May 17 – Al-Qa'im bi-Amr Allah, Fatimid caliph (b. 893)
- May 26 – Edmund I, king of England (b. 921)
- June 4 – Guaimar II (Gybbosus), Lombard prince
- July 24 – Muhammad ibn Tughj al-Ikhshid, ruler of Egypt (b. 882)
- August 1
  - Ali ibn Isa al-Jarrah, Abbasid vizier (b. 859)
  - Lady Xu Xinyue, wife of Qian Yuanguan (b. 902)
- November 26 – Li Congyan, Chinese general (b. 898)
- Abu Bakr bin Yahya al-Suli, Abbasid scholar and chess player (b. 880)
- Abu Bakr Shibli, Persian official and Sufi (b. 861)
- Cormacan Eigeas, Irish poet (approximate date)
- Daniel Ben Moses al-Kumisi, Jewish scholar
- Ibrahim ibn Sinan, Abbasid mathematician (b. 908)
- John of Rila, Bulgarian hermit (approximate date)
- Marinus II, pope of the Catholic Church
- Rachilidis, Swiss Benedictine hermit and saint
- Yeghishe I, Catholicos of All Armenians
- Zhao Jiliang, chancellor of Later Shu (b. 883)

947

- January 12 – Sang Weihan, Chinese chief of staff (b. 898)
- January 27 – Zhang Yanze, Chinese general and governor
- January 28 – Jing Yanguang, Chinese general (b. 892)
- May 18 – Tai Zong, emperor of the Liao Dynasty (b. 902)
- May 30 – Ma Xifan, king of Chu (Ten Kingdoms) (b. 899)
- June 21 – Zhang Li, official of the Liao Dynasty
- June 22 – Qian Hongzuo, king of Wuyue (b. 928)
- June 23
  - Li Congyi, prince of Later Tang (b. 931)
  - Wang, imperial consort of Later Tang
- August 19 – Abu Yazid, Kharijite Berber leader (b. 873)
- November 23 – Berthold, duke of Bavaria
- Ce Acatl Topiltzin, Toltec ruler (approximate date)
- Hugh of Arles, king of Italy and Lower Burgundy
- Jordi, bishop of Vic (Spain) (approximate date)
- Li Renda, Chinese warlord and governor
- Liu Xu, chancellor of Later Tang and Later Jin (b. 888)
- Thomais of Lesbos, Byzantine saint (b. ca. 909)
- Wulfgar, bishop of Lichfield (approximate date)

948

- June 15 – Romanos I, Byzantine emperor (b. c. 870)
- March 10 – Liu Zhiyuan, founder of the Later Han (b. 895)
- March 13 – Du Chongwei, Chinese general and governor
- April 28 – Hu Jinsi, Chinese general and prefect
- August 24 – Zhang Ye, Chinese general and chancellor
- November 10 – Zhao Yanshou, Chinese general and governor
- December 1 – Gao Conghui, prince and ruler of Jingnan (b. 891)
- December 12 – Li Song, Chinese official and chancellor
- Al-Qasim Guennoun, Idrisid ruler and sultan
- Blácaire mac Gofraid, Viking king of Dublin
- Gormflaith ingen Flann Sinna, Irish queen
- Ibrahim ibn Simjur, Samanid governor
- Minamoto no Kintada, Japanese waka poet (b. 889)
- Sunifred II, count of Urgell (Spain) (b. c. 870)

949

- June 1 – Godfrey, Frankish nobleman (approximate date)
- August 17 – Li Shouzhen, Chinese general and governor
- September 14 – Fujiwara no Tadahira, Japanese statesman and regent (b. 880)
- September/October – Abdallah ibn al-Mustakfi, Abbasid caliph (b. 905)

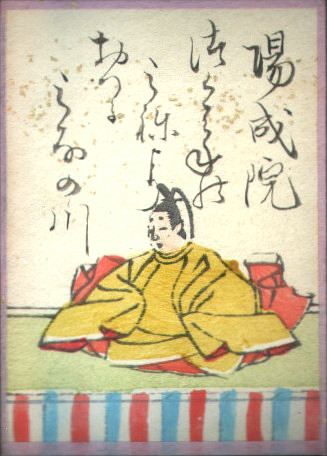
Emperor Yozei

- December – Imad al-Dawla, founder of the Buyid dynasty (Iran)
- December 2 – Odo of Wetterau, German nobleman
- December 10 – Herman I, duke of Swabia
- date unknown
  - An, Chinese imperial consort (Five Dynasties)
  - Eadric, ealdorman of Wessex (approximate date)
  - Jeongjong, king of Goryeo (Korea) (b. 923)
  - Miroslav (or Miroslaus), king of Croatia
  - Xiao Han, general of the Khitan Liao dynasty
  - Yunmen Wenyan, Chinese Zen Buddhist monk
  - Zhao Tingyin, general of Later Shu (b. 883)
