= 944 =

Calendar year

944 in various calendars
Gregorian calendar	944; CMXLIV
Ab urbe condita	1697
Armenian calendar	393; ԹՎ ՅՂԳ
Assyrian calendar	5694
Balinese saka calendar	865–866
Bengali calendar	350–351
Berber calendar	1894
Buddhist calendar	1488
Burmese calendar	306
Byzantine calendar	6452–6453
Chinese calendar	癸卯年 (Water Rabbit); 3641 or 3434 — to — 甲辰年 (Wood Dragon); 3642 or 3435
Coptic calendar	660–661
Discordian calendar	2110
Ethiopian calendar	936–937
Hebrew calendar	4704–4705
- Hindu calendars
Vikram Samvat	1000–1001
Shaka Samvat	865–866
Kali Yuga	4044–4045
Holocene calendar	10944
Iranian calendar	322–323
Islamic calendar	332–333
Japanese calendar	Tengyō 7 (天慶７年)
Javanese calendar	844–845
Julian calendar	944; CMXLIV
Korean calendar	3277
Minguo calendar	968 before ROC 民前968年
Nanakshahi calendar	−524
Seleucid era	1255/1256 AG
Thai solar calendar	1486–1487
Tibetan calendar	ཆུ་མོ་ཡོས་ལོ་ (female Water-Hare); 1070 or 689 or −83 — to — ཤིང་ཕོ་འབྲུག་ལོ་ (male Wood-Dragon); 1071 or 690 or −82

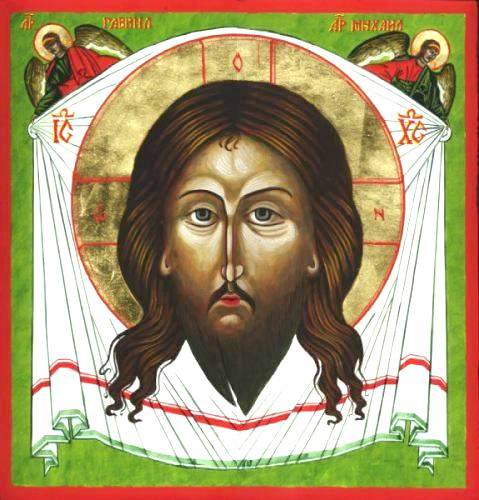
The "Holy Mandylion" with the face of Jesus

Year 944 (CMXLIV) was a leap year starting on Monday of the Julian calendar.

== Events ==
=== By place ===
==== Byzantine Empire ====
- Arab–Byzantine War: Byzantine forces are defeated by Sayf al-Dawla. He captures the city of Aleppo, and extends his control over the Al-Jazira–Upper Mesopotamia region. Al-Dawla's rule is recognized by the Ikhshidids. With the recovery of Edessa, the Greeks also obtain the fabled Image of Edessa.
- August 15 – The "Holy Mandylion" (a cloth with the face of Jesus) is conveyed to Constantinople, where it arrives on the feast of the Dormition of the Theotokos. A triumphal entry is staged for the relic in the capital.
- December 16 – Emperor Romanos I is arrested and deposed after a 14-year reign by his own sons, the co-emperors Stephen and Constantine. He is carried off to the Prince Islands and forced to become a monk.

==== Europe ====
- King Hugh of Provence dispatches an embassy to King Otto I of the East Frankish Kingdom, offering a large sum of cash if he promises not to provide assistance to Berengar of Ivrea. Otto refuses this offer.
- Raymond III (or Pons I), count of Toulouse, travels to Nevers (southeast of Paris) to declare his fidelity to king Louis IV ("d'Outremer"). He is granted the title 'prince of the Aquitanians' by the king.
- The largest recorded epidemic of ergotism, also known as "Saint Anthony's Fire, kills 40,000 people in France.

==== England ====
- King Edmund I regains (with the help of Danish settlers) the territory he ceded to Olaf Guthfrithson. He conquers Northumbria and cedes Cumberland to Malcolm I, king of the 'Picts and Scots'.
- A great storm sweeps across Wessex and many houses are destroyed, 1,500 in London alone (a significant proportion of the town).

==== Africa ====
- Abu Yazid, a Kharijite Berber leader, launches a rebellion in the Aurès Mountains (modern Algeria) against the Fatamids, seeking aid from the Caliphate of Córdoba in Al-Andalus.
- The cities of Algiers and Miliana are re-founded by the Zirid ruler (emir) Buluggin ibn Ziri.

==== Asia ====
- In Tĩnh Hải quân, after the demise of Ngô Quyền, Dương Tam Kha forced Ngô Xương Ngập, Kha's nephew-in-law, to abdicate and installed himself as king, calling himself Dương Bình Vương (King Ping of Yang).

=== By topic ===
==== Religion ====
- The Al-Askari Mosque is built in Samarra (modern Iraq).

== Births ==
- Abd al-Malik I, Samanid emir (d. 961)
- Al-Mu'ayyad Ahmad, Muslim imam (d. 1020)
- Fujiwara no Akimitsu, Japanese bureaucrat (d. 1021)
- Fujiwara no Sukemasa, Japanese statesman (d. 998)
- Ibn Juljul, Muslim physician (approximate date)
- John VIII bar Abdoun, patriarch of Antioch (d. 1033)
- Otto (or Odo), duke of Burgundy (d. 965)

== Deaths ==
- February 25 – Lin Ding, Chinese official and chancellor
- April 8 – Wang Yanxi, emperor of Min (Ten Kingdoms)
- April 23 – Wichmann the Elder, Frankish nobleman
- Abu Mansur al-Maturidi, Muslim theologian (b. 853)
- Abu Tahir al-Jannabi, Qarmatian ruler (b. 906)
- Ch'oe Ŏn-wi, Korean minister and calligrapher (b. 868)
- Donnchad Donn, High King of Ireland
- Flaithbertach mac Inmainén, Irish abbot
- Mahipala I, Gurjara-Pratihara king
- Liu Hongchang, Chinese chancellor
- Fang Gao, Chinese official and chief of staff
- Li, empress of Min (Ten Kingdoms)
- Wang Yacheng, Chinese prince
- Duan Siping, ruler of Dali (approximate date)
- Ngo Quyen, Vietnamese king
- Harshavarman II, Angkorian king
