= 景宗 =

景宗 may refer to several Chinese and Korean monarchs.

- See Gyeongjong (disambiguation) for Korean monarchs
- See Jingzong (disambiguation) for Chinese monarchs
