= Empress Dowager Huang =

Empress Dowager Huang (Chinese: 黃太后; Pe̍h-ōe-jī: N̂g Thài-hōo, personal name unknown), referred to semi-formally as Empress Dowager Longqi (Chinese: 龍啟太后; Pe̍h-ōe-jī: Liông-khé Thài-hōo) after her son Wang Yanjun (Emperor Huizong)'s Longqi era name, was an empress dowager of the Chinese Five Dynasties and Ten Kingdoms period state Min. She was the primary concubine of Wang Shenzhi (Prince Zhongyi), who was commonly regarded as the founder of the Min state, and the mother of Wang Yanjun, the first Min ruler to claim the title of emperor.

== Background ==
It is not known when the future Empress Dowager Huang was born, but it was known that she was from Quan Prefecture (泉州, in modern Choân-chiu, Fujian). Her father Huang Nayu (Chinese: 黃訥裕; Pe̍h-ōe-jī: N̂g Lu̍t-jū) was a cousin of Huang Tao (Chinese: 黃滔; Pe̍h-ōe-jī: N̂g Tho), who had served as the secretary to a military governor (Jiedushi) of Weiwu Circuit (Chinese: 威武; Pe̍h-ōe-jī: Ui-bú), the territory of which later formed the state of Min. (As Wang Shenzhi's older brother and predecessor Wang Chao was the first military governor of Weiwu and Wang Shenzhi was the second, Huang Tao's service was likely under Wang Chao.)

When Huang Nayu himself served under Wang Shenzhi, Wang Shenzhi took Lady Huang as his primary concubine; she was the mother of his second son Wang Yanjun. Wang Shenzhi, who carried the title of Prince of Min at that time, died in 925 and was succeeded initially by his oldest son Wang Yanhan. Wang Yanhan claimed the title of King of Min in 926, but was killed later that year in a joint revolt by Wang Yanjun and Wang Shenzhi's adoptive son Wang Yanbing. Wang Yanjun took over the governance of the territory, initially only claiming the title of acting military governor of Weiwu. Emperor Mingzong of Later Tang (r. 926-933) commissioned him as full military governor in 927 and created him the Prince of Langye, and then as the Prince of Min in 928. As some point, Emperor Mingzong also created Lady Huang the Lady of Lu. In gratitude, Wang Yanjun submitted a tribute of platinum.

== As empress dowager and grand empress dowager ==
In 933, Wang Yanjun claimed the title of Emperor of Min and changed his name to Wang Lin. Later that year, he honored Lady Huang as empress dowager. (As his era name was Longqi, she became known in historical sources as "Empress Dowager Longqi.") In 934, when Jian Prefecture (建州, in modern Nanping, Fujian) was under siege by Jiang Yanhui (蔣延徽), a general of Min's northwestern neighbor Wu, Wang Lin initially commissioned his general Zhang Yanrou (張彥柔) and his brother Wang Yanzong (王延宗) to lead an army to relieve the siege on Jian Prefecture. However, the soldiers mutinied on the way to Jian Prefecture and clamored for Wang Lin to send his much-despised chief of staff Xue Wenjie to them for their disposal. Wang Lin initially took no action, but both Empress Dowager Huang and Wang Lin's oldest son Wang Jipeng advocated for Xue to be delivered to the soldiers. When Wang Lin made no overt opposition to their advocacy, Wang Jipeng seized Xue outside the palace gates and delivered him to the soldiers, who put him to death and cannibalized his body. They then continued the march to Jian Prefecture. With Min forces and forces from Min's northern ally Wuyue converging on Jian Prefecture, Jiang withdrew.

At one point, Wang Lin visited the Huang clan home and ancestral shrine in Quan Prefecture; the ground, the fields, and the trees were covered with silk for his visit. When Huang Kejia (黃克家), the son of one of Empress Dowager Huang's cousins, informed him that, because the home was built close to the sea, it felt as cold as winter even during the fall, he decreed that clay be given to the Huang clan so that they could reinforce the bricks with it to better insulate the home.

In 935, Wang Jipeng assassinated Wang Lin and Wang Lin's wife Empress Chen Jinfeng, and then took over the throne (as Emperor Kangzong), claiming to be doing so under Empress Dowager Huang's orders. In 936, Wang Jipeng (who had by that point changed his name to Wang Chang) honored her as grand empress dowager. That was the last historical reference to her, and it is not known when she died.

== Notes and references ==
- Zizhi Tongjian, vols. 278, 279, 280.
- Spring and Autumn Annals of the Ten Kingdoms (十國春秋), vol. 94.
