= Lian Chongyu =

Lian Chongyu (Chinese: 連重遇) (died February 14, 945) was a general of the Chinese Min state. In 944, he and another general, Zhu Wenjin, assassinated the emperor Wang Yanxi (Emperor Jingzong). He then supported Zhu as the new emperor of the Min state, but the officer Lin Renhan (林仁翰) assassinated him and Zhu less than a year later and submitted to Wang Yanxi's brother Wang Yanzheng (Tiande Emperor), who had been warring with Wang Yanxi.

== Background and service under Wang Yanjun ==
Little was recorded in history about Lian Chongyu's background. He was said to be "of Guangshan" (光山, in modern Xinyang, Henan) — i.e., nearly the same geographic origin as Min's founder Wang Shenzhi and Wang Shenzhi's older brothers Wang Chao and Wang Shengui (王審邽), who were from nearby Gushi (固始, also in modern Xinyang) — which would have meant that, if he was actually born there, he would have been one of the old guard soldiers who settled with the Wang brothers in the Min region; it is possible, however, that he was one of those soldiers' sons but still said to be from Guangshan. During the reign of Wang Shenzhi's son Wang Yanjun (also known as Wang Lin, Emperor Huizong), when he organized Wang Shenzhi's closest guards into two elite corps, the Gongchen (拱宸) and the Konghe (控鶴), he made Zhu Wenjin the commander of the Gongchen and Lian the commander of the Konghe.

== Service under Wang Jipeng ==
Wang Yanjun was killed in a coup in 935, and was succeeded by his son Wang Jipeng (also known as Wang Chang, Emperor Kangzong). Wang Jipeng created his own elite corps, the Chenwei (宸衛), and treated them better than he did the Gongchen and the Konghe, such that the soldiers of the two corps were alienated. He also alienated Zhu Wenjin and Lian Chongyu by repeatedly insulting them. Hearing of discontent in the Gongchen and Konghe ranks, he considered sending them away from the capital to Zhang (漳州, in modern Zhangzhou, Fujian) and Quan (泉州, in modern Quanzhou, Fujian) Prefectures, respectively, causing fear in the two corps.

In 939, someone set fire to Wang Jipeng's northern palace, causing a large fire in the palace complex. Wang Jipeng ordered Lian to command 10,000 soldiers (apparently both the Konghe and other corps) to carry out the cleanup of the palace complex, and this difficult labor caused the soldiers to be distressed. At one point, Wang Jipeng came to suspect Lian of being involved in setting the fire, and considered killing him. The imperial scholar Chen Tan (陳郯) informed this to Lian. Therefore, one night when Lian was on night duty, he took the opportunity to command the Konghe and the Gongchen to rise against Wang Jipeng, and then to also get other corps to join in. With only the Chenwei defending him, Wang Jipeng was defeated. He tried to flee to Min's northern neighbor Wuyue, but was captured on the way and killed. Lian supported Wang Jipeng's uncle (Wang Yanjun's younger brother) Wang Yanxi (also known as Wang Xi, Emperor Jingzong) to be emperor. (Zhu's role in this coup was not clearly stated.)

== Service under Wang Yanxi ==
Zhu Wenjin and Lian Chongyu apparently remained in command of the imperial guards during Wang Yanxi's reign, as Zhu remained in command of the Gongchen Corps, and Lian received the title of director of palace security (閣門使, Geimenshi). Fearing that they would eventually be punished for Wang Jipeng's death, they had their families enter into marital relationships to form a power bloc. Meanwhile, Wang Yanxi's reign was a violent one, and it caused apprehension in them, particularly after he killed one of their close associates, Wei Conglang (魏從朗) (who had become the commander of the Konghe Corps). Further, on another occasion, Wang Yanxi recited in their presence, in one occasion, Bai Juyi's poem, which stated, "When it comes to matching people's hearts, one cannot have any expectations even when they were physically close." They wept and bowed to him, proclaiming their faithfulness, but drew no response from Wang Yanxi.

Meanwhile, Wang Yanxi's wife Empress Li had become jealous of his favor for his concubine Consort Shang. She wanted him dead so that their son Wang Yacheng could become emperor. She therefore sent messengers to Zhu and Lian, informing them that Wang Yanxi was suspicious of them. In spring 944, Empress Li's father, the chancellor Li Zhen (李真) happened to be ill. Wang Yanxi went to visit him, and Zhu and Lian used this chance to have the Gongchen officer Qian Da (錢達) assassinate Wang Yanxi. They then summoned the officials at the imperial gathering hall, stating to the officials:

Gaozu, the Emperor Zhaowu [(referring to Wang Shenzhi)] established the state of Min. But now his descendants are licentious, cruel, slothful, and lacking in order. The Heaven has tired of the Wangs, and it is time for someone with greater virtue.

With no one daring to speak against them there, Lian pushed Zhu onto the throne and put imperial robe and crown on him, and then led the officials in bowing to him, proclaiming themselves as subjects. Zhu thereafter claimed the title of emperor.

== Service under Zhu Wenjin ==
Zhu Wenjin had some 50 members of the Wang imperial clan arrested and executed, although he had Wang Yanxi buried with ceremony due an emperor. When the official Zheng Yuanbi (鄭元弼) refused to submit to him, he first forced Zheng into retirement, and when Zheng tried to flee to Wang Yanxi's younger brother Wang Yanzheng — who had been in civil war with Wang Yanxi for years and who had claimed the title of emperor of a splinter state of Yin at Jian Prefecture (建州, in modern Nanping, Fujian) — he had Zheng killed. He put Lian Chongyu in charge of the army. He also tried to reverse some of Wang Yanxi's unpopular policies, by ending palace construction projects and by releasing the ladies in waiting from palace service.

Wang Yanzheng immediately sent his general Wu Chengyi (吳成義) to attack Min's capital Fu Prefecture (福州, in modern Fuzhou), but was unable to capture it. Thereafter, Zhu sent the army officers Huang Shaopo (黃紹頗) to serve as the prefect of Quan and Cheng Wenwei (程文緯) to serve as the prefect of Zhang, apparently to affirm his control of those prefectures. The prefect of Ting Prefecture (汀州, in modern Longyan, Fujian), Xu Wenzhen (許文稹), also submitted to him. When he sent emissaries to try to establish friendly relations with Min's (and Yin's) northwestern neighbor Southern Tang, however, Southern Tang's emperor Li Jing put his emissaries under arrest and intended to attack him, but could not do so immediately due to the heat and spread of disease at the time.

In fall 944, Zhu apparently stopped claiming the title of emperor. Instead, he claimed only the title of acting military governor of Weiwu Circuit (威武, headquartered at Fu Prefecture) and acting overseer of the state of Min, and he sent emissaries to Later Jin to submit as a subject. In response, Later Jin's emperor Shi Chonggui commissioned him as full military governor of Weiwu and acting overseer of Min.

In winter 944, a group of officers at Quan, led by Liu Congxiao, rose up against and killed Huang, submitting to Wang Yanzheng and supporting Wang Yanzheng's nephew Wang Jixun (王繼勳) to serve as acting prefect. Hearing of this, the Zhang officer Cheng Mo (程謨) assassinated Cheng Wenwei and supported another nephew of Wang Yanzheng's, Wang Jicheng (王繼成), as acting prefect, in submission to Wang Yanzheng. Xu Wenzhen also submitted Ting Prefecture to Wang Yanzheng.

Around new year 945, Shi created Zhu the King of Min and gave him the honorary chancellor designation Tong Zhongshu Menxia Pingzhangshi (同中書門下平章事).

Hearing of what happened at Quan and Zhang, Zhu sent the officers Lin Shouliang (林守諒) and Li Ting'e (李廷鍔) to attack Quan. With aid from Wang Yanzheng's general Du Jin (杜進), however, Liu crushed Lin's and Li's army, killing Lin and capturing Li. Wang Yanzheng then again sent Wu to attack Fu, and faced with this threat, Zhu sent his son(s) and brother(s) to serve as hostages to Wuyue, seeking aid from it.

Meanwhile, Wang Yanzheng warded off an attack from the Southern Tang general Cha Wenhui (查文徽). However, hearing of this, Wu decided to take advantage to intimidate the people at Fu, claiming (falsely) that the Southern Tang army was intending to aid the Yin army in attacking Fu. This caused great fear in the people at Fu, and apparently caused Zhu to have the chancellor Li Guangzhun (李光準) to take the imperial seals to offer them to Wang Yanzheng (i.e., effectively to surrender).

Shortly after, before any negotiations could begin with Wang Yanzheng, the officer Lin Renhan led a group of 30 soldiers in attacking Lian's mansion, stating to them, "We have served the Wang clan for generations. Now we are under the control of an usurper. If the Prince of Fusha [(i.e., Wang Yanzheng, who carried the title of Prince of Fusha under Wang Yanxi)] arrived, how could we see him again?" He personally killed Lian, and then cut off Lian's head to show the rest of the army, stating to them, "The Prince of Fusha will soon be here. All of your families will be slaughtered. Now Lian Chongyu is dead. You can save yourselves by seizing Zhu Wenjin!" The soldiers were encouraged, and they followed him in killing Zhu. Lin opened the gates to welcome Wu in, and sent the heads of Lian and Zhu to Wang Yanzheng.

== Notes and references ==
- Spring and Autumn Annals of the Ten Kingdoms, vol. 98.
- Zizhi Tongjian, vols. 282, 284.
