= Empress Li (Min Kingdom) =

Empress Li (Chinese: 李皇后; personal name unknown) (died 944) was an empress consort of China's Min state. She was the wife of its fifth ruler, Wang Yanxi (Emperor Jingzong).

== Background ==
It is not known when the future Empress Li was born. It is known, however, that she was a daughter of the Min official Li Zhen (李真), who would eventually become chancellor. It is not known when she married Wang Yanxi — although, it appeared, given the sequence of events, that it was likely before his reign, although it was possible that the marital relationship came after he was enthroned. His only historically known son, Wang Yacheng, was by her.

In 939, Wang Yanxi seized power in a coup in which his nephew and predecessor, Wang Jipeng (also known was Wang Chang, Emperor Kangzong) was killed. Contrary to the emperor title that Wang Jipeng claimed, Wang Yanxi (who then changed his name to Wang Xi) claimed only the title of King of Min at this point and was formally a vassal to Shi Jingtang the emperor of Later Jin, even though he also took on imperial trappings. Historical accounts did not indicate his giving Lady Li any titles at this point, although her father Li Zhen, who was then in retirement, was recalled to the imperial government to serve as chancellor. Her son Wang Yacheng received progressively greater titles — initially the commander of the imperial guards and chancellor, later the Prince of Langye, then the Prince of Changle as well as the military governor (Jiedushi) of Min's most important circuit, Weiwu Circuit (威武, headquartered at Min's capital Changle (長樂), in modern Fuzhou, Fujian).

== As empress ==
In 941, Wang Xi claimed the title of emperor. In 942, he created Lady Li empress. Her son Wang Yacheng received the title of Prince of Min. It was said that, as empress, she had a strong personality and liked drinking. Wang Xi was said to both favor and fear her.

In 942, there was a time when Wang Xi commissioned the chancellor Yu Tingying to be the prefect of Quan Prefecture (泉州, in modern Quanzhou, Fujian). Yu engaged in corruption upon arriving there, including taking women for himself while claiming that he was doing so under Wang Xi's orders, for the women to serve as consorts in Wang Xi's palace. When Wang Xi received reports of this, he sent imperial censors to investigate. In fear, Yu returned to Changle, trying to defend himself. Wang Xi was set to have him arrested, when Yu offered a large tribute of money. Wang Xi was pleased, and, after extracting a second tribute (on Empress Li's behalf), allowed Yu to return to Quan. Indeed, after this incident, the officials began to directly offer tributes to the empress.

However, in 943, Wang Xi took the daughter of the general Shang Baoyin (尚保殷) as a concubine, and favored her greatly for her beauty, such that it was described that when he was drunk, he would do whatever Consort Shang wanted, including killing or sparing whomever she wanted. Empress Li was jealous, and wanted Wang Xi assassinated so that Wang Yacheng could be emperor. At that time, there were mutual suspicions between Wang Xi and the two imperial guard generals who were responsible for overthrowing Wang Jipeng, Zhu Wenjin and Lian Chongyu. She sent messengers to Zhu and Lian, informing of Wang Xi's suspicions toward them, to inflame them. At that time, her father Li Zhen happened to be ill, and Wang Xi decided to go visit him. As he left the palace on a horse, Zhu and Lian had him assassinated, and then slaughtered the imperial Wang clan, including Empress Li and Wang Yacheng.

== Notes and references ==
- Spring and Autumn Annals of the Ten Kingdoms, vol. 94.
- Zizhi Tongjian, vols. 283, 284.

Chinese nobility
Preceded by Empress Li Chunyan	Empress of Min; 942–944	Succeeded by Empress Zhang
