= Jingzong =

Jingzong are different temple names used for emperors of China. It may refer to:

- Emperor Jingzong of Tang (809–827, reigned 824–827), emperor of the Tang dynasty
- Wang Yanxi (died 944, reigned 939–944), emperor of the Min dynasty
- Emperor Jingzong of Liao (948–982, reigned 969–982), emperor of the Liao dynasty
- Emperor Jingzong of Western Xia (1003–1048, reigned 1038–1048), emperor of Western Xia
