= Wang Yacheng =

Wang Yacheng (Chinese: 王亞澄) (died 944) was an imperial prince of the Chinese Min state. He was the only historically known son of its fifth ruler Wang Yanxi (Emperor Jingzong). He held various noble titles throughout his life, including Prince of Langya (琅琊王), Prince of Changle (長樂王), and Prince of Min (閩王).

== Background ==
It is not known when Wang Yacheng was born. He was the only son of Wang Yanxi's whose existence was recorded in historical records. His mother was Lady Li, who, based on the sequence of the later events, likely was already married to Wang Yanxi before Wang Yanxi became Min's ruler. Lady Li's father was the official Li Zhen (李真).

== During Wang Yanxi's reign ==
In 939, Wang Yanxi became Min's ruler in a coup that saw the overthrow and death of his predecessor and nephew (Wang Yacheng's cousin) Wang Jipeng (also known as Wang Chang, Emperor Kangzong). He, changing his name to Wang Xi, claimed only the title of King of Min initially. In 941, he commissioned Wang Yacheng the commander of the imperial guards and chancellor with the designation Tong Zhongshu Menxia Pingzhangshi (同中書門下平章事). Sometime thereafter, he created Wang Yacheng the Prince of Langye. Later in 941, he gave Wang Yacheng the title of military governor (Jiedushi) of Min's most important circuit, Weiwu Circuit (威武, headquartered at Min's capital Changle (長樂), in modern Fuzhou, Fujian) and greater chancellor title of Zhongshu Ling (中書令); he also created Wang Yacheng the Prince of Changle.

Shortly after, Wang Xi claimed the title of emperor. In spring 942, he created Wang Yacheng's mother Lady Li empress, and created Wang Yacheng the Prince of Min.

However, although Wang Xi was said to both favor and fear Empress Li, he later took the daughter of the general Shang Baoyin (尚保殷) as a concubine, and was said to favor her greatly on account of her beauty. Jealous of the favor that Consort Shang was receiving, Empress Li wanted to have Wang Xi assassinated so that Wang Yacheng could be emperor. Knowing that the imperial guard commanders Zhu Wenjin and Lian Chongyu were already having mutual suspicions with Wang Xi, she sent messengers to inform Zhu and Lian of Wang Xi's suspicions toward them. In summer 944, when Wang Yacheng's grandfather Li Zhen was ill, Wang Xi went to visit him, and Zhu and Lian took this opportunity to have him assassinated. They then slaughtered the imperial Wang clan, including Empress Li and Wang Yacheng.

== Notes and references ==
- Spring and Autumn Annals of the Ten Kingdoms, vol. 94.
- Zizhi Tongjian, vols. 282, 283, 284.
