= Wang Shenzhi =

Prince of Min from 909 to 925

Emperor Taizu of Min 閩太祖
- Prince of Min
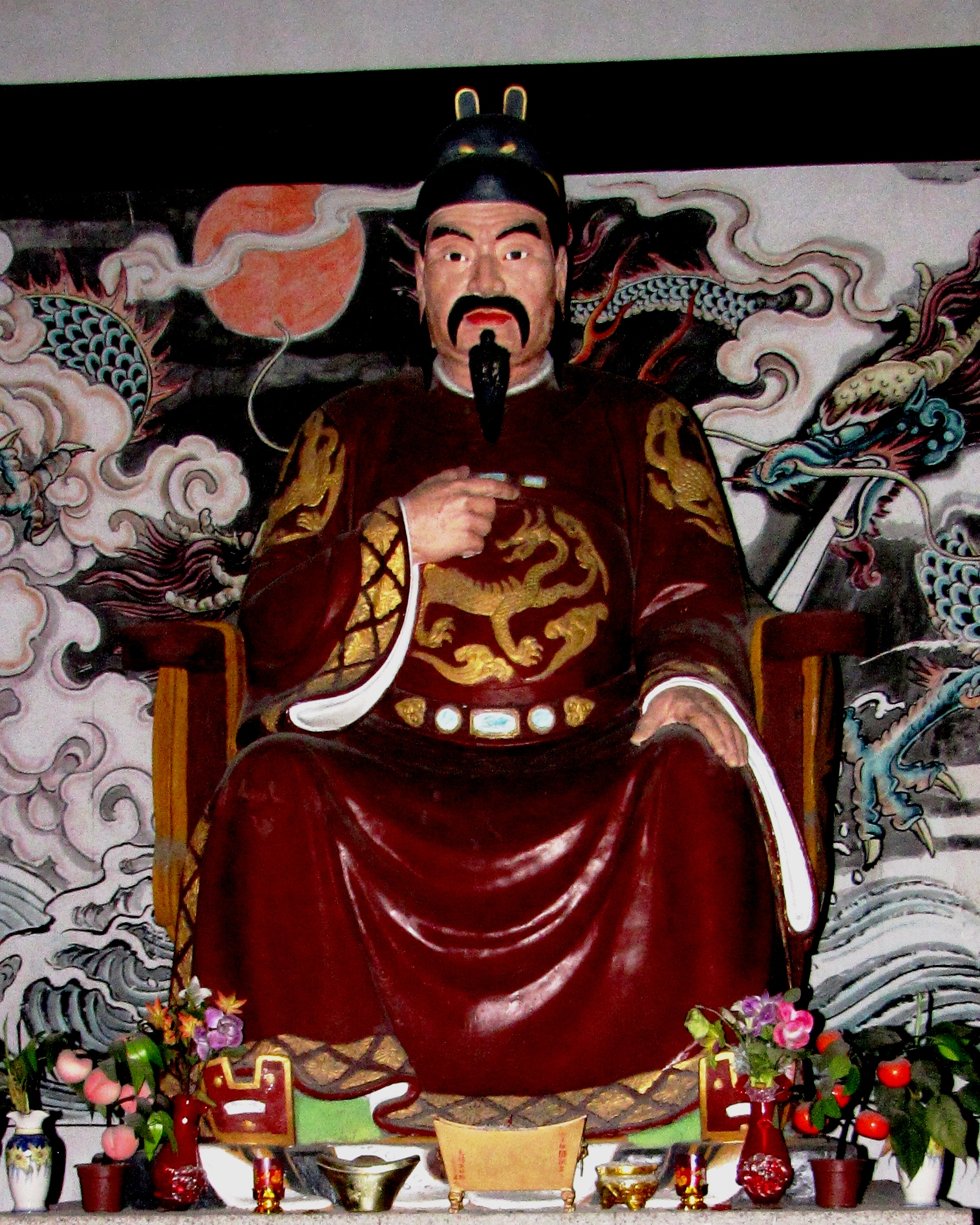
- Statue of Wang Shenzhi in Fuzhou.

Prince of Min (閩王)
- Reign: April 27, 909 – December 30, 925
- Successor: Wang Yanhan

Commandery Prince of Langya (琅琊郡王)
- Reign: 904–909

Jiedushi of Weiwu Circuit (威武軍節度使)
- Tenure: 898 – 925
- Predecessor: Wang Chao
- Successor: Wang Yanhan
- Born: 862; Gushi County, Guāngzhōu Prefecture, Huainan Circuit, Tang
- Died: December 30, 925; Fuzhou, Min
- Burial: Xuanling Mausoleum (宣陵, in modern Jin'an District, Fuzhou)
Full name
- Family name: Wáng (王); Given name: Shěnzhī (審知)
Posthumous name
- Prince Zhōngyì; (忠懿王, "faithful and benevolent"), later Emperor Zhāowǔxiào; (昭武孝皇帝, "accomplished, martial, and filial")
Temple name
- Tàizǔ (太祖)
- House: Wang
- Dynasty: Min

Wang Shenzhi
- Traditional Chinese: 王審知
- Simplified Chinese: 王审知
Transcriptions
Southern Min
- Hokkien POJ: Ông Sím-ti
Eastern Min
- Fuzhou BUC: Uòng Sīng-dĭ

Wang Shenzhi (Chinese: 王審知; 862 – December 30, 925), courtesy name Xintong (信通) or Xiangqing (詳卿), posthumous name Prince Zhongyi of Min (閩忠懿王) and also known by his temple name as the Emperor Taizu of Min (閩太祖), was the founding monarch of Min (now part of the Fujian province, with a capital of Fuzhou) during China's Five Dynasties and Ten Kingdoms period, reigning as prince but posthumously promoted to the rank of emperor. He was from Gushi in modern-day Henan.

== Background ==
Wang Shenzhi was born in 862, during the reign of Emperor Yizong. His fifth-generation ancestor Wang Ye (王曄) served as the magistrate of Gushi County (固始, in modern Xinyang, Henan) in Guāng Prefecture (光州), and because the people loved him, he settled his family in Gushi. Wang Shenzhi hailed from a long line of illustrious administrators and military officers feted by historians. After the family settled in Gushi, they subsequently became known for their family business. His father's name was Wang Nin (王恁), and his mother was a Lady Dong. He had two older brothers, Wang Chao and Wang Shengui (王審邽).

== Service under Wang Xu ==
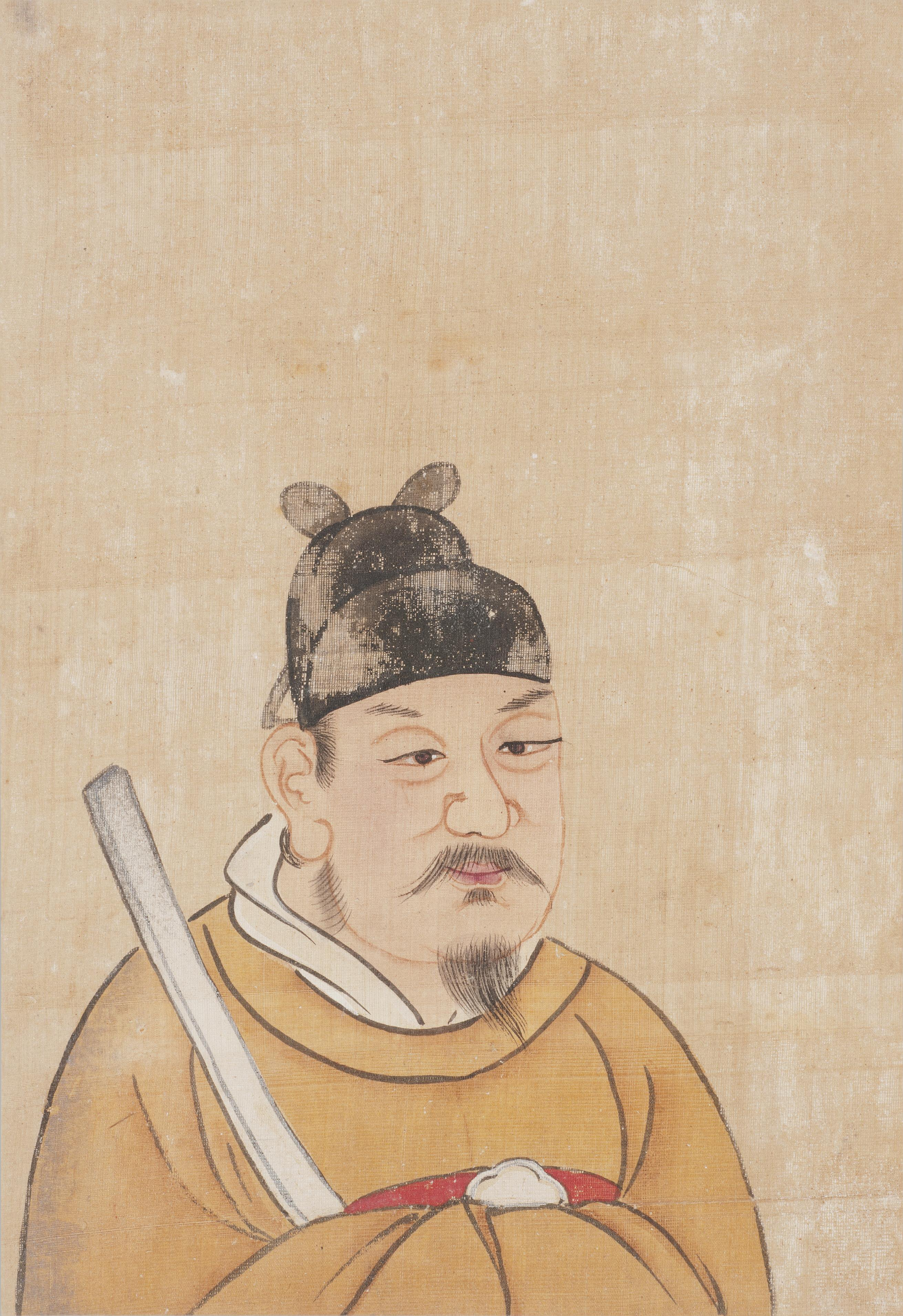
As depicted in the album Portraits of Famous Men c. 1900, housed in the Philadelphia Museum of Art

In 881, the bandit leader Wang Xu, along with his brother-in-law Liu Xingquan (劉行全), captured Guāng Prefecture (光州, in modern Xinyang); he was subsequently commissioned the prefect of Guang Prefecture by Qin Zongquan the military governor (Jiedushi) of Fengguo Circuit (奉國, headquartered in modern Zhumadian, Henan). Wang Xu forced the men of Guang Prefecture to join his army, and he made Wang Chao, who had previously been a government worker at the Gushi County government, his discipline officer. Later on, however, Qin turned against the Tang imperial government and was on the cusp of claiming imperial title himself. He ordered Wang Xu to pay taxes to him. When Wang Xu was unable to do so, he launched an army to attack Wang. Wang Xu, in fear, gathered 5,000 soldiers from Guang and Shou Prefectures and forced the people to cross the Yangtze River to the south. By spring 885, Wang had continued south and captured Ting (汀州, in modern Longyan, Fujian) and Zhang (漳州, in modern Zhangzhou, Fujian) Prefectures, but was not able to hold either for long. By the time that Wang Xu reached Zhang Prefecture, his army was running low on food. As the terrain in Fujian Circuit (福建, headquartered in modern Fuzhou, Fujian), which Zhang Prefecture belonged to, was rugged, he ordered that the old and the weak be abandoned. However, in violation of his order, Wang Chao and his brothers continued to take their mother Lady Dong with them. Wang Xu rebuked them and threatened to put Lady Dong to death. They begged for Lady Dong's life, offering to die in her stead. Other officers also spoke on their behalf, and Wang Xu relented.

Meanwhile, by this point, Wang Xu had also become extremely paranoid, as he had been warned by a sorcerer that there was qi belonging to a king in his army, so he began to put to death anyone whom he considered to have talents surpassing his own—going as far as putting Liu Xingquan to death. The fact that Wang was willing to put someone as close to him as Liu to death terrified the other officers. When the army reached Na'an (南安, in modern Quanzhou, Fujian), Wang Chao persuaded Wang Xu's forward commander, who feared that he would be Wang Xu's next target, into turning against Wang Xu. The forward commander and Wang Chao thus laid an ambush for Wang Xu and, when he was caught off-guard, arrested him. Wang Chao initially wanted to support the forward commander to be the new leader, but the forward commander pointed out that it was Wang Chao's idea that allowed them to survive Wang Xu's cruelty, and so the army agreed to have Wang Chao become their leader. Wang Chao subsequently took over Quan Prefecture (泉州, in modern Quanzhou, Fujian) and obtained a commission from Chen Yan the governor (觀察使, Guanchashi) of Fujian Circuit (福建道, headquartered in modern Fuzhou, Fujian) as the prefect of Quan Prefecture.

== Service under Wang Chao ==
In 891, Chen Yan grew deathly ill. Chen sent an order to Wang Chao, summoning him to the circuit capital Fu Prefecture (福州), intending to entrust the matters of the circuit to him. Before he could depart, however, Chen died, and Chen's brother-in-law Fan Hui (范暉) got the soldiers at Fu Prefecture to support him as acting governor to resist Wang. Fan, however, soon lost the support of the soldiers, and Wang Chao sent his cousin Wang Yanfu (王彥復) and Wang Shenzhi as Wang Yanfu's deputy to lead an army to attack Fu Prefecture. However, they could not capture it quickly, and Fan sought aid from Dong Chang the military governor of Weisheng Circuit (威勝, headquartered in modern Shaoxing, Zhejiang), who dispatched an army to aid him. Hearing that news, Wang Yanfu and Wang Shengui submitted a report to Wang Chao, requesting to withdraw. Wang Chao refused. When they requested that he come to the front to oversee the attack, he responded:

If soldiers die, I will replace the soldiers. If the generals die, I will replace the generals. If the soldiers and the generals all are dead, I will go myself.

Wang Yanfu and Wang Shenzhi, fearful of the rebuke, intensified their attacks. By summer 893, the food supply in Fu Prefecture ran out. Fan abandoned it and fled, and the Weisheng army, still on the way, hearing that Fan had fled, returned to Weisheng. Fan was killed by his soldiers in flight. Wang entered Fu Prefecture and claimed the title of acting governor. After Wang Chao was subsequently made governor of Fujian, and then the military governor (with the circuit's name upgraded from Fujian to Weiwu (威武)), Wang Shenzhi served as deputy military governor. It was said that whenever Wang Shenzhi had faults, Wang Chao would batter him, but Wang Shenzhi would not complain. In 897, when Wang Chao grew ill, he did not try to pass his authorities to any of his sons; rather, he entrusted the matters of the circuit to Wang Shenzhi. After Wang Chao died around the new year 898, Wang Shenzhi offered the authorities to Wang Shengui, who was then the prefect of Quan Prefecture, but Wang Shengui declined on the account that he considered Wang Shenzhi more accomplished. Wang Shenzhi thus claimed the title of acting military governor of Weiwu and submitted a report of what occurred to then-ruling Emperor Zhaozong, who commissioned him as acting military governor and later in the year made him full military governor.

== As military governor of Weiwu ==
In 900, Emperor Zhaozong bestowed the honorary chancellor designation of Tong Zhongshu Menxia Pingzhangshi (同中書門下平章事) on Wang Shenzhi. He was later successively given the honorary titles of acting Sikong (司空) and acting Situ (司徒) (two of the Three Excellencies). In 902, Wang built an outer wall for Fu Prefecture. In 904, Emperor Zhaozong created him the Prince of Langya.

In 907, the major warlord Zhu Quanzhong the military governor of Xuanwu Circuit (宣武, headquartered in modern Kaifeng, Henan) forced Emperor Zhaozong's son and successor Emperor Ai to yield the throne to him, ending Tang and starting a new Later Liang dynasty with him as its Emperor Taizu. Wang Shenzhi recognized the new emperor, and was subsequently given the greater chancellor title of Shizhong (侍中). In 909, Emperor Taizu created him the Prince of Min, and also gave him the chancellor title of Zhongshu Ling (中書令, governor of Palace Secretariat).

== As Prince of Min ==
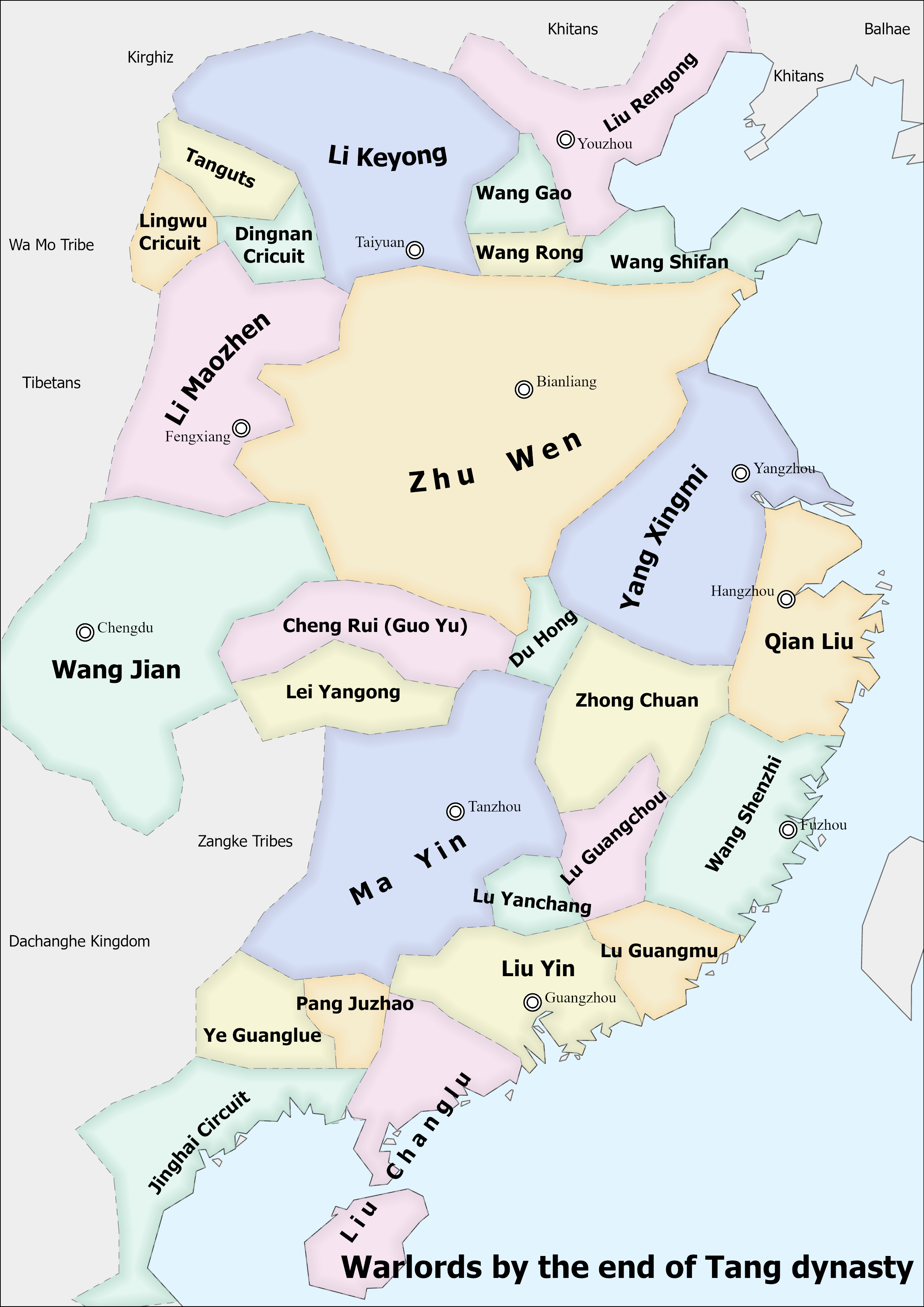
Map of warlords before the end of Tang dynasty, with the territory ruled by Wang Shenzhi

=== Early reign ===
Meanwhile, also in 909, after Wang Shenzhi felt slighted by Zhang Zhiyuan (張知遠), the emissary from Hongnong (predecessor state to Wu, then ruled by Yang Wo, the Prince of Hongnong, who did not recognize the Later Liang emperor), Wang decapitated Zhang and broke off diplomatic relations with Hongnong.

As prince, Wang was said to be frugal, often wearing hemp shoes, with his mansion remaining small and unexpanded. His criminal penalties were relaxed and tax rates were low; these policies were said to lead to both the government and the people becoming wealthy, and his realm to be calm. He submitted yearly tributes to the Later Liang emperor by sea route, via Later Liang's Deng (登州) and Lai (萊州, both in modern Yantai, Shandong) Prefectures, but the sea route was said to be so treacherous and corrupt that 40–50% casualties were common.

In 916, Wang Shenzhi gave a daughter to Qian Chuanxiang (錢傳珦, later known as Qian Yuanxiang (錢元珦)), the son of Qian Liu, the prince of Min's neighbor to the north, Wuyue, in marriage. Qian Chuanxiang personally went to Min for the marriage, and it was said that after the wedding, the relationship between Min and Wuyue became more friendly. Also in 916, Wang Shenzhi began to make lead coins, and thereafter, lead coins were circulated along with the traditional copper coins.

=== Late reign ===
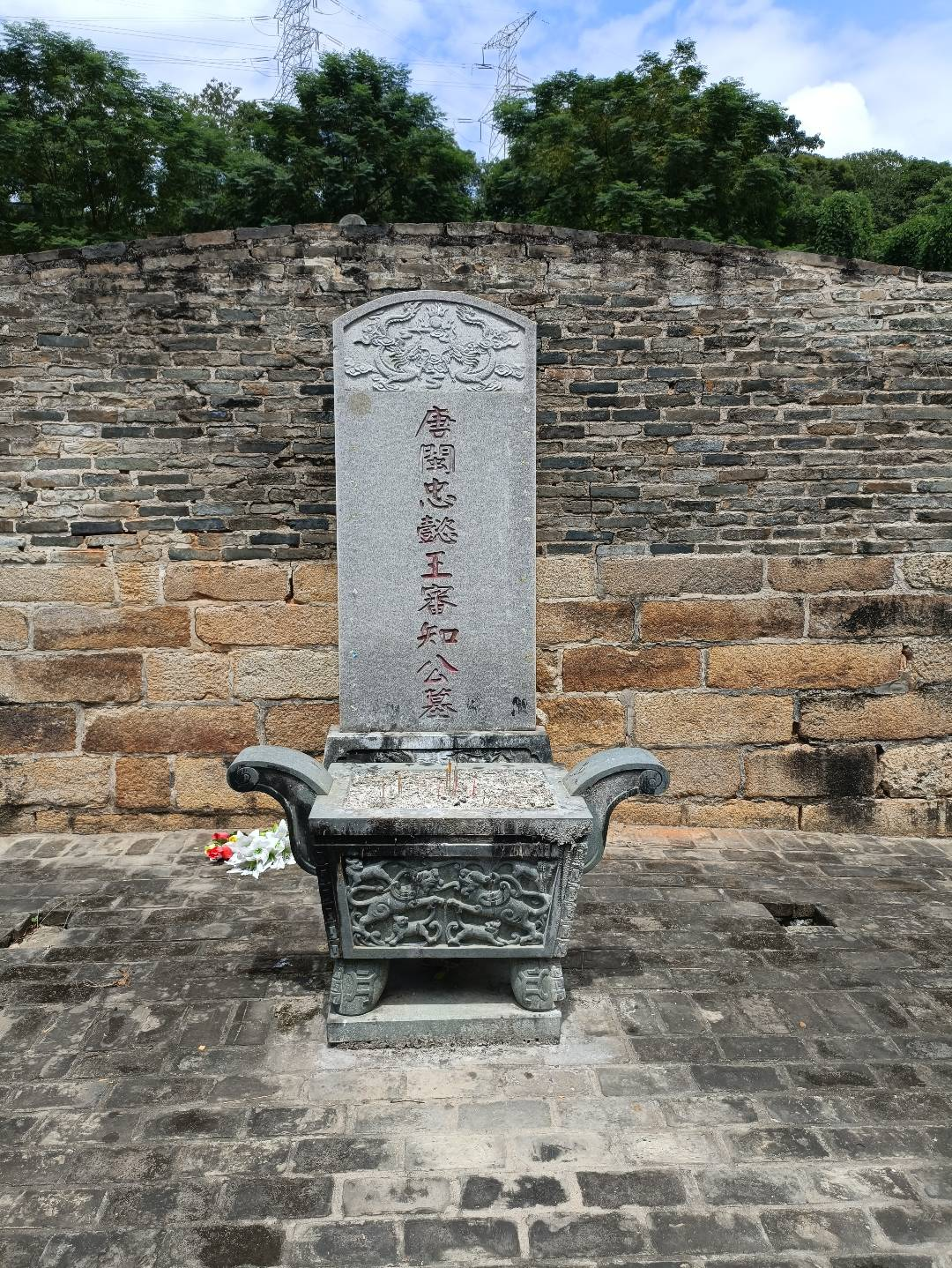
Tomb of Wang Shenzhi

In 917, Wang Shenzhi took Liu Hua, a niece of Liu Yan, the emperor of Min's southwestern neighbor Yue (which would later be known as Southern Han), whose title was Princess of Qingyuan, as the wife of his second son Wang Yanjun. (Written historical accounts indicated that she was a daughter of Liu Yan's, but her tombstone was subsequently discovered, revealing that she was actually the daughter of Liu Yan's older brother and predecessor, Liu Yin.)

In 918, Wu, which was then ruled by Yang Wo's brother and successor Yang Longyan, launched a major attack, commanded by the general Liu Xin (劉信), on Tan Quanbo the military governor of Baisheng Circuit (百勝, headquartered in modern Ganzhou, Jiangxi), who was ruling the circuit in independence but whose nominal allegiance had vacillated between Wu and Later Liang. Tan sought aid from Min, as well as Wuyue and Chu. Min forces advanced to Yudu (雩都, in modern Ganzhou) to try to aid Tan, while Wuyue and Chu also sent troops. After Liu then defeated Chu troops, Min and Wuyue forces also withdrew. Subsequently, Liu captured Tan's capital Qian Prefecture (虔州), allowing Wu to directly take over Baisheng Circuit.

Apparently sometime after Wang Shengui's death (the date of which was not recorded in traditional histories, but appeared to be 903), Wang Shenzhi allowed Wang Shengui's son Wang Yanbin (王延彬) to take over governance of Quan Prefecture, and later bestowed on him the title of military governor of Pinglu Circuit (平盧, whose territory was not under Min control, being headquartered in modern Weifang, Shandong). Wang Yanbin initially governed the prefecture well. However, later, after he received a white deer and a purple lingzhi, he became arrogant, believing in the prophecies of the Buddhist monk Haoyuan (浩源) that he would become prince in the future. He further secretly sent emissaries to Later Liang, seeking to be a Later Liang vassal independently of Wang Shenzhi. When Wang Shenzhi discovered this conspiracyin 920, he had Haoyuan and his associates executed and removed Wang Yanbin from his posts, sending him back to his mansion.

In 922, there was an incident where Liu Yan (whose state had been renamed Han by that point and thereafter was known as Southern Han in traditional Chinese sources), believing in sorcerers who told him that he should go to Meikou (梅口, in modern Meizhou, Guangdong) to avoid a disaster. With Meikou on the border between Southern Han and Min, the Min general Wang Yanmei (王延美), who might have been either a son of Wang Shenzhi's or Yang Shengui's, decided to launch an ambush on Liu. However, Liu received news of the ambush and left Meikou before Min forces could attack.

In 923, Li Cunxu the Prince of Jin, whose state was an archrival of Later Liang's to its north, declared himself the emperor of a new Later Tang (as Emperor Zhuangzong), and later that year captured Later Liang's capital Daliang (today Kaifeng, Henan). The Later Liang emperor Zhu Zhen (son of Emperor Taizu) committed suicide, ending Later Liang. Subsequently, emissaries were exchanged between Min and Later Tang, and Wang Shenzhi recognized Emperor Zhuangzong's suzerainty.

In 924, Southern Han launched an attack on Min, with Liu Yan himself commanding the troops and reaching the borders of Min's Ting and Zhang Prefectures. A Min counterattack defeated Southern Han forces, however, and Liu Yan withdrew.

In 925, Wang Shenzhi grew ill, and he put his oldest son Wang Yanhan, then the deputy military governor of Weiwu, in charge of the affairs of the state. (A rumor at that time was that Wang Shenzhi's illness was due to poisoning by Wang Yanhan's wife Lady Cui.) Later in the year, Wang Shenzhi died, and Wang Yanhan took over the state, although at that time claiming only the title of acting military governor/jiedushi of Weiwu.

== Personal information ==
- Ancestors
  - Wang Jian (王翦) (Qin Dynasty General)
  - Wang Dao (王导) (Jin Dynasty Prime Minister)
  - Wang Fangqing (王方庆) (Tang/Zhou Dynasty Chancellor)
- Father
  - Wang Nin (王恁)
- Mother
  - Lady Dong, posthumously honored Lady Dowager of Qin and yet later Lady Dowager Zhuanghui of Jin
- Wife
  - Lady Ren Neiming, posthumously honored empress
- Major Concubines
  - Lady Huang, the Lady of Lu, later honored empress dowager (honored 933), later grand empress dowager (honored 936), mother of Prince Yanjun
  - Lady Chen Jinfeng, later empress to Wang Yanjun
- Children
  - Wang Yanhan (王延翰), later king
  - Wang Yanjun (王延鈞), name later changed to Wang Lin (王鏻), later Emperor Huizong
  - Wang Yanmei (王延美)
  - Wang Yanbao (王延保)
  - Wang Yanwu (王延武) (executed by Wang Jipeng 939)
  - Wang Yanwang (王延望) (executed by Wang Jipeng 939)
  - Wang Yanxī (王延羲, note different tone than his brother), name later changed to Wang Xi (王曦), later Emperor Jingzong
  - Wang Yanxǐ (王延喜, note different tone than his brother) (killed by Zhu Wenjin 944)
  - Wang Yanzheng (王延政), the Prince of Fusha, later emperor
  - Wang Yanzi (王延資)
  - Wang Yanzong (王延宗)
  - Lady of Langye, wife of Li Min (李敏)
  - Daughter, wife of Zhang Siqi (張思齊)
  - Lady of Langye, wife of Qian Yuanxiang (錢元珦), son of Qian Liu king of Wuyue
  - Daughter, wife of Yu Tingyin (余廷隱)
  - Daughter
  - Daughter
  - Daughter
- Adoptive Children
  - Wang Yanbing (王延稟), né Zhou Yanchen (周彥琛) (executed by Wang Yanjun 931), posthumously honored Prince Lingzhao (honored 933?) then as Prince Weisu of Wuping (honored 943)
  - Wang Yanfeng (王延豐), biological child of Wang Shenzhi's brother Wang Chao

== Notes and references ==
- History of the Five Dynasties, vol. 134.
- New History of the Five Dynasties, vol. 68.
- Zizhi Tongjian, vols. 254, 259, 261, 262, 266, 267, 270, 271, 273, 274.
- Spring and Autumn Annals of the Ten Kingdoms (十國春秋), vol. 90.

Regnal titles
Preceded by None (Founder of kingdom)	Prince of Min; 909–925	Succeeded by Wang Yanhan
