= Rachilidis =

Saint Rachilidis
- Died: 946
- Venerated in: Roman Catholic Church
- Feast: 23 November

Rachilidis of Saint Gall (died 946), was a recluse, who lived some time in the 10th century, in Switzerland. She was the daughter of a noble family. She had various ailments, including an incurable skin disease.

According to her vita, Saint Wiborada took Rachilidis into her cell when Rachilidis was a young girl; according to scholar Jane Tibbetts Schulenburg, "thus in the name of Christian love and charity, Wiborada embraced the young girl and adopted her as her spiritual daughter" for the rest of her life. Wiborada's vita reports that her prayers healed Rachilidis, but "because of her affection for Wiborada", she continued to serve her and also became a recluse. They lived together in Wiborada's cell until Wiborada was killed by Hungarian invaders c. 926. Rachildis is believed to have died around the year 946.
