= Wang Yanjun =

Emperor of Min from 933 to 935

Emperor Huizong of Min 閩惠宗
- Emperor of Min

Emperor of Min
- Reign: 933 – November 17, 935
- Successor: Wang Jipeng

King of Min
- Reign: August 13, 928 – November 17, 935
- Predecessor: Wang Yanhan
- Successor: Proclaimed the emperor

Jiedushi of Weiwu Circuit (威武軍節度使)
- Tenure: August 13, 928 – 933 (Acting: January 14, 927 – August 13, 928)
- Predecessor: Wang Yanhan
- Successor: Wang Jipeng
- Born: unknown
- Died: November 17, 935
Full name
- Family name: Wáng (王); Given name: Initially Yánjūn (延鈞), later Lín (鏻 or 璘) (changed 933)
Era dates
- Tiancheng (天成): 926-930; Changxing (長興): 930-932; Lóngqǐ (龍啟): 933-934; Yǒnghé (永和): 935
Posthumous name
- Emperor Qísù Míngxiào (齊肅明孝皇帝)
Temple name
- Huìzōng (惠宗)
- House: Wang
- Dynasty: Min

Wang Yanjun (Chinese: 王延鈞) (died November 17, 935), known as Wang Lin (王鏻 or 王璘) from 933 to 935, also known by his temple name as the Emperor Huizong of Min (閩惠宗), used the name of Xuanxi (玄錫) while briefly being a Taoist monk, was the third monarch of Min during the Five Dynasties and Ten Kingdoms period of China, and the first ruler of Min to use the title of emperor.

== Background ==
It is not known when Wang Yanjun was born. He was the second biological son of his father Wang Shenzhi, the first ruler of the Wang clan to use the title of Prince of Min. His mother was Wang Shenzhi's concubine Lady Huang.

== During Wang Shenzhi's reign ==
The first historical reference to Wang Yanjun was in 917, when his father Wang Shenzhi, who was then carrying the title of Prince of Min as a Later Liang vassal, had him marry the Southern Han princess Liu Hua, the Princess Qingyuan. (The traditional account in the Zizhi Tongjian described Liu Hua as the daughter of Southern Han's first emperor Liu Yan (Emperor Gaozu), but her tombstone, since discovered, indicated that she was the daughter of Liu Yan's older brother Liu Yin. At that time, Wang Yanjun was serving as a commander of his father's headquarter guards.

== During Wang Yanhan's reign ==
No further historical references were made to Wang Yanjun until after his father Wang Shenzhi died in 925—at which time his older brother Wang Yanhan took over the reins of the Min realm, initially only claiming the title of acting military governor of Weiwu Circuit (威武)—i.e., the Tang dynasty circuit that formed Min territory—as a vassal to Later Liang's successor Later Tang. (Wang Yanhan claimed the title of King of Min in 926 without Later Tang imperial sanction, effectively declaring himself independent of Later Tang.) It was said that several months after Wang Yanhan's succession that he, who did not treat his brothers well, sent Wang Yanjun out of the capital Changle (長樂, in modern Fuzhou, Fujian) to serve as the prefect of Quan Prefecture (泉州, in modern Quanzhou, Fujian). Further, Wang Yanhan carried out incessant selections of women to become his concubines and servants in his palace; when both Wang Yanjun and an adoptive brother, Wang Yanbing (who was older than Wang Yanjun) the prefect of Jian Prefecture (建州, in modern Nanping, Fujian) submitted petitions urging him to change his behavior, he became angry, and therefore his relationship with these two brothers deteriorated.

Around the new year 927, Wang Yanbing and Wang Yanjun jointly launched an attack on Fu Prefecture (福州, i.e., Changle). Wang Yanbing arrived first, defeating Wang Yanhan's army commander Chen Tao (陳陶), causing Chen to commit suicide. Wang Yanbing then had his army scale the walls and enter the city, killing both Wang Yanhan and Wang Yanhan's wife Lady Cui on accusations that they had poisoned Wang Shenzhi. When Wang Yanjun subsequently arrived, Wang Yanbing opened the gates to welcome him in and supported him as the acting military governor of Weiwu.

== As military governor of Weiwu ==
Shortly after Wang Yanjun took over, Wang Yanbing returned to Jian, and as he was set to depart Fu, he stated to Wang Yanjun: "Carefully guard the forefathers' foundation; do not trouble me, your older brother, into coming down again!" Wang Yanjun outwardly tried to humbly accept this statement, but his expressions changed as he did so, showing displeasure.

As Wang Yanjun's use of the acting military governor title showed resumed submission to the Later Tang regime, later in the year, Emperor Mingzong of Later Tang commissioned him as full military governor (Jiedushi); Emperor Mingzong also bestowed on him the honorary chancellor designation of acting Zhongshu Ling (中書令) and created him the Prince of Langye. In 928, Emperor Mingzong further created him the Prince of Min.

== As Prince of Min ==
In 928, Wang Yanjun had 20,000 of his people become Buddhist monks, and it was said that from that point on, the region was full of monks.

In 930, Wang's wife Lady Liu Hua died. After Lady Liu's death, he married a Lady Jin as his wife. (However, a contradictory account indicated that his second wife was also named Liu.)

In 931, Wang Yanjun apparently was ill, and this became known to Wang Yanbing, who decided that this would be the time to take over the realm. Wang Yanbing left his second son Wang Jisheng (王繼升) in charge of Jian, while heading to Fu with his oldest son Wang Jixiong (王繼雄) to attack it together. During the siege, Wang Yanjun's general Wang Renda (王仁達)—possibly a nephew to both Wang Yanjun and Wang Yanbing—pretended to surrender to Wang Jixiong, and then ambushed and killed him. Wang Jixiong's death destroyed the morale of both Wang Yanbing himself and his army, and Wang Renda subsequently crushed his army, capturing him. Wang Yanjun initially sent messengers to Jian to try to comfort the garrison there, but Wang Yanbing's followers there killed the messengers, and then took Wang Jisheng and his younger brother Wang Jilun (王繼倫) and fled to Wuyue. Wang Yanjun subsequently executed Wang Yanbing and sent another brother, Wang Yanzheng, to Jian to comfort the people there.

Despite Wang's previously demonstrated Buddhist leanings, he also was very interested in Taoist teachings on immortality, and, exploiting this, in 931, the Taoist monk Chen Shouyuan (陳守元) and sorcerers Xue Yan (徐彥) and Xing Shengtao (興盛韜) persuaded him to build a luxurious temple, Emperor Bao Palace (寶皇宮, apparently devoted to a deity named Emperor Bao), with Chen serving as its superintendent. Later in the year, Chen further persuaded him that Emperor Bao had decreed that if he left his office for some time to devote himself to Taoism, he could be an emperor for 60 years. Late in 931, he thus had his son Wang Jipeng temporarily take over the matters of state, while he himself became a Taoist monk with the name Xuanxi and received Taoist amulets. He returned to the throne in spring 932.

Both Chen and Xue then stated to Wang Yanjun that Emperor Bao had further decreed that he would become a god after being emperor for 60 years. This caused Wang to become very arrogant. He sent a petition to Emperor Mingzong, demanding to be given the titles, in light of the recent deaths of Qian Liu the King of Wuyue and Ma Yin the King of Chu, of Prince of Wuyue and Shangshu Ling (尚書令, a title that Ma held). When the Later Tang government gave no response, Wang cut off his tributes to Later Tang.

== As Emperor of Min ==
In 933, after his subjects claimed to have seen a dragon, Wang Yanjun declared himself Emperor of Min after receiving blessings at Emperor Bao's Palace. He also changed his name to Wang Lin. However, instead of the usual seven ancestral temples for his ancestors, he only built five. (As stated in his biography in the Zizhi Tongjian, he had ambivalent in his feelings about declaring himself emperor, and this might have been a sign of the ambivalence.) He made his official Li Min (李敏) and his son Wang Jipeng chancellors, and his close associate Wu Xu (吳勗) his chief of staff (Shumishi). At that time, it happened that Later Tang emissaries Pei Jie (裴傑) and Cheng Kan (程侃) were arriving. Wang Lin sent Pei back to the Later Tang imperial court, but refused to send Cheng back despite Cheng's pleas. Despite claiming imperial title, however, Wang Lin was said to be cognizant that his state was small and weak, and therefore tried to maintain cordial relations with his neighboring states, allowing peacefulness for his realm. He subsequently made Wang Jipeng the Prince of Fu and the director of Emperor Bao's Palace. After an earthquake later in the year, he also left the throne again briefly and had Wang Jipeng serve as regent, before returning to the throne. However, it was also said that he was building luxurious palaces, going against the example of his father Wang Shenzhi, who was frugal. He honored his mother Lady Huang as empress dowager.

Later in the year, another officer, Xue Wenjie, had become a chief of staff as well. Xue was known for gathering wealth for Wang Lin by means of falsely accusing rich people of crimes, and then executing them and seizing their wealth. He also encouraged Wang Lin to find ways to reduce the Wang clan members' power. It was said that Wang Lin's nephew Wang Jitu (王繼圖) became so incensed that he considered a coup. When Wang Jitu's plans were discovered, he was executed, and more than 1,000 people were executed with him. Later in the year, Xue also falsely accused Wu of treason, and Wu was also executed. Later in 933, at Wang Lin's own initiative, Wang Renda was also executed.

When Xue also tried to falsely accuse Wu Guang (吳光), whose clan was a prominent one at Jian Prefecture, however, Xue's plans backfired, as Wu took his clan and other followers, over 10,000 in total, and fled to Min's northwest neighbor Wu. Wu Guang subsequently tried to encourage Wu to attack Min, and the Wu general Jiang Yanhui (蔣延徽) the prefect of Xin Prefecture (信州, in modern Shangrao, Jiangxi), decided to attack without first getting approval from the Wu imperial government. Wang Lin was forced to seek aid from Wuyue. Before Wuyue could react to his request, however, Jiang had already put Jian Prefecture under siege. Wang Lin sent his general Zhang Yanrou (張彥柔) and his brother Wang Yanzong (王延宗) to try to save Jian. On the way, however, their army refused to advance any further, stating that they would not fight unless they took possession of Xue. When this news arrived at Changle, Empress Dowager Huang and Wang Jipeng persuaded Wang Lin to turn Xue over, and Xue tried to plead for himself. Wang Lin took no initial reaction, but appeared to implicitly approve when Wang Jipeng then seized Xue and delivered him to the army, where the soldiers killed him and ate his flesh, and then advanced on Jian. With Wuyue forces also advancing on Jian, and Jiang's own campaign undermined by the Wu regent Xu Zhigao (who was apprehensive that Jiang might support one of the Wu imperial princes, Yang Meng, in opposing Xue), Jiang had to withdraw with heavy losses inflicted by pursuing Min troops.

It was said that while Wang Lin's wife Lady Jin was beautiful and virtuous, he did not favor her, and he never created her empress. Rather, he favored his concubine Consort Chen Jinfeng, who had been a servant girl or concubine of his father Wang Shenzhi's, despite her appearance being said to be ugly, apparently on account of her licentiousness. In 935, he created Consort Cheng empress.

However, it was also said that in his later years, Wang Lin was impotent after suffering a stroke. He had favored the close associate Gui Shouming (歸守明), and Gui thus was allowed to enter the palace freely. Empress Chen began an affair with him, and also with another associate, Li Keyin (李可殷). As Li Keyin had falsely accused the officer Li Fang (李倣), and Empress Chen's clansman Chen Kuangsheng (陳匡勝) had disrespected Wang Jipeng, both Li Fang and Wang Jipeng became resentful of the situation. When Wang Lin's conditions grew worse in winter 935, Wang Jipeng thought that he was going to inherit the throne, and therefore was happy. Meanwhile, as Li Fang believed that Wang Lin would not recover, he had Li Keyin killed. However, when Wang Lin's conditions subsequently became better, Empress Chen informed him of Li Keyin's death, and he ordered an investigation. Li Fang, in fear, started an uprising and took his soldiers into the palace. The soldiers wounded Wang Lin, who was suffering tremendously from his wound. His palace servants, not wanting to see him suffer further, killed him. Li Fang and Wang Jipeng then killed Empress Chen, Chen Kuangsheng, another Chen clansman Chen Shou'en (陳守恩), Gui, and Wang Jipeng's younger brother Wang Jitao (whom Wang Jipeng also disliked). Wang Jipeng then took the throne (as Emperor Kangzong).

== Personal information ==
- Father
  - Wang Shenzhi, Prince Zhongyi of Min, later further posthumously honored Emperor Taizu
- Mother
  - Lady Huang, later honored empress dowager and then grand empress dowager
- Wives
  - Liu Hua (896–930), Southern Han's Princess Qingyuan, daughter of Liu Yin, Lady Minghui of Yan
  - Lady Jin
  - Empress Chen Jinfeng, originally concubine of Wang Shenzhi's (created and killed 935)
- Children
  - Wang Jiyan (王繼嚴), known for some time as Wang Jiyu (王繼裕) (changed 939) but later name changed back to Wang Jiyan, the Prince of Jian (poisoned by Wang Yanxi 941)
  - Wang Jipeng (王繼鵬), later name changed to Wang Chang (王昶), the Prince of Fu (created 933), later Emperor Kangzong
  - Wang Jigong (王繼恭), the Prince of Linhai (created 936, killed by Lian Chongyu 939)
  - Wang Jitao (王繼韜) (killed 935)
  - Wang Jirong (王繼鎔)
  - At least two daughters

== Notes and references ==
- History of the Five Dynasties, vol. 134.
- New History of the Five Dynasties, vol. 68.
- Spring and Autumn Annals of the Ten Kingdoms (十國春秋), vol. 91.
- Zizhi Tongjian, vols. 270, 275, 276, 277, 278, 279.

Chinese nobility
Preceded by title recreated	Prince of Min; 928–933	claimed imperial title
Preceded by None (title first claimed)	Emperor of Min; 933–935	Succeeded by Wang Jipeng (Emperor Kangzong)
Preceded by Li Siyuan of Later Tang	Ruler of China (Fujian) (de jure); 933–935	Succeeded by Wang Jipeng (Emperor Kangzong)
Preceded by Wang Yanhan	Ruler of China (Fujian) (de facto); 927–935	Succeeded by Wang Jipeng (Emperor Kangzong)
