= Gyeongjong =

Gyeongjong or Kyŏngjong may refer to:

- Gyeongjong of Joseon, r. 1720–1724, Korean ruler
- Gyeongjong of Goryeo, r. 976–981, Korean ruler
