= Wang Yanxi =

Emperor of Min from 941 to 944

Emperor Jingzong of Min 閩景宗
- Emperor of Great Min

Emperor of Min
- Reign: 941 – April 8, 944
- Predecessor: Wang Jipeng
- Successor: Zhu Wenjin (as Prince of Min)

King of Min
- Reign: August 30, 939 – 941
- Predecessor: Wang Jipeng
- Successor: Zhu Wenjin (as Prince of Min)
- Died: April 8, 944; Fuzhou
- Empress: Empress Li
- Issue: Wang Yacheng, son At least one daughter
Names
- Wáng Yánxī (王延羲), later changed to Wáng Xī (王曦)
Era name and dates
- Yǒnglóng (永隆): 939–944
Regnal name
- Emperor Ruiming Wenguang Wusheng Guangde Longdao Daxiao (睿明文廣武聖光德隆道大孝皇帝)
Posthumous name
- Emperor Ruiwen Guangwu Mingsheng Yuande Longdao Daxiao (睿文廣武明聖元德隆道大孝皇帝)
Temple name
- Jǐngzōng (景宗)
- House: Wang
- Dynasty: Min
- Father: Wang Shenzhi

Wang Yanxi (Chinese: 王延羲) (died April 8, 944), known as Wang Xi (王曦) during his reign, also known by his temple name as the Emperor Jingzong of Min (閩景宗), was an emperor of Min during China's Five Dynasties and Ten Kingdoms period. He became Min's ruler after a coup that overthrew his nephew Wang Jipeng (Emperor Kangzong) in 939. With his reign being a cruel one, the imperial guard officers Zhu Wenjin and Lian Chongyu (who were instrumental in the coup that brought him to power) assassinated him and slaughtered the imperial Wang clan. Zhu thereafter claimed the title of Emperor of Min.

== Background ==
It is not known when Wang Yanxi was born, but it is known that he was the 28th son of Wang Shenzhi, commonly regarded as Min's first ruler and later posthumously honored as Emperor Taizu (although formally, Wang Shenzhi remained a vassal of Tang and Later Liang). Historical accounts did not indicate who his mother was.

Historical accounts also did not discuss most of Wang Yanxi's activities during the next three rulers of Min—Wang Yanxi's older brothers Wang Yanhan and Wang Yanjun (also known as Wang Lin, Emperor Huizong), and nephew (Wang Yanjun's son) Wang Jipeng (also known as Wang Chang, Emperor Kangzong). Based on the timing of subsequent events, it appeared likely (although not conclusively so) that at some point while still being a subject, he married the daughter of the official Li Zhen (李真) as his wife. (It is possible that he married her after he became emperor.) It is known, however, that there was a time when an emissary of Silla offered a sword to Wang Jipeng as a gift at a feast. When Wang Jipeng showed it to the chancellor Wang Tan (王倓) and asked Wang Tan, "What can I use it for?" and Wang Tan responded, "You can use it to behead unfaithful subjects," Wang Yanxi, who happened to be at the feast as well and who was already secretly having designs on the throne, was so shocked that his expressions changed. At one point, Wang Yanxi apparently received the titles of Zuo Pushe (左僕射) and chancellor (同中書門下平章事, Tong Zhongshu Menxia Pingzhangshi), but fearing that Wang Jipeng would suspect him, he pretended to be crazy and dumb. Wang Jipeng thereafter gave him Taoist monk's robes, and placed him in the Wuyi Mountains, but later recalled him to the capital Changle (長樂, in modern Fuzhou, Fujian) and put him under house arrest.

By 939, Wang Jipeng had alienated two elite corps that his father Wang Yanjun established, the Gongchen (拱宸) and the Anhe (按鶴), by establishing his own elite corps, the Chenwei (宸衛). The commanders of the Gongchen and Anhe corps, Zhu Wenjin and Lian Chongyu, feared death, and therefore decided to mutiny. They rose and defeated Wang Jipeng's Chenwei corps, and then went to Wang Yanxi's mansion, offering the throne to him. Wang Jipeng fled, but was later captured and executed. Wang Yanxi took the throne.

== Reign ==
=== As King of Min ===
While Wang Yanxi took on much of the imperial trappings—including commissioning officials for his imperial administration, issuing a general pardon, and changing era name—he nevertheless only assumed the title of King of Min at the moment and submitted a petition to Shi Jingtang, the emperor of Later Jin, which then controlled the Central Plains, to be Later Jin's vassal. He changed his name to Wang Xi. Publicly, in announcing Wang Jipeng's death, he blamed it on a mutiny by the Chenwei Corps. He commissioned (presumably by this point) his father-in-law Li Zhen as chancellor. A number of sorcerers who had misled Wang Jipeng were executed.

However, Wang Xi, once his power was affirmed, turned out to be arrogant, licentious, and cruel, and he was suspicious of other members of the Wang imperial clan. His younger brother Wang Yanzheng the prefect of Jian Prefecture (建州, in modern Nanping, Fujian) often wrote him to try to correct his behavior, but that led him to be angry. He sent his close associates Ye Qiao (業翹) to serve as monitor of Wang Yanzheng's army, and Du Hanchong (杜漢崇) to serve as monitor of the army at Nanzhen Base (南鎮軍, near Jian). Both Ye and Du frequently submitted reports of their suspicions about Wang Yanzheng, adding to the friction. In 940, after an argument between Wang Yanzheng and Ye, Wang Yanzheng tried to arrest Ye, but Ye was able to flee. Wang Yanzheng then rose in full rebellion against Wang Xi's administration, and he quickly defeated the imperial generals in Jian's vicinity. When Wang Xi then sent the generals Pan Shikui (潘師逵) and Wu Xingzhen (吳行真) to attack Jian, Wang Yanzheng sought aid from Min's northern neighbor Wuyue. Wuyue's king Qian Yuanguan sent a detachment commanded by Yang Renquan and Xue Wanzhong (薛萬忠) to aid Wang Yanzheng, but Wang Yanzheng defeated Pan and Wu before the Wuyue army's arrival. He then tried to send the Wuyue army away, but Yang and Xue refused to leave Jian's vicinity. Wang Yanzheng then turned around and sought aid from Wang Xi, who sent their nephew Wang Jiye (王繼業) to head toward Jian and cut off the supply routes of Yang and Xue's army. Wang Yanzheng then defeated them, forcing them to retreat. Subsequently, Min's northwestern neighbor Southern Tang's emperor Li Bian sent emissaries to Wang Xi and Wang Yanzheng, trying to quell their dispute. Under Li Bian's moderation, Wang Yanzheng sent servants to Changle, and his servants subsequently swore an oath, on his behalf, with Wang Xi, at their father Wang Shenzhi's tomb, formally entering a peace between the brothers, but privately, they remained suspicious of each other. Wang Xi subsequently build up Changle's defenses to defend a possible attack, and the conscription, as well as Wang Xi's encouragement for people to become Buddhist monks, led to some 11,000 men becoming monks. Meanwhile, Shi, who had previously cut off relations with Min due to the arrogance of Wang Jipeng (who wanted the two states to be treated equally, angering Shi), received Wang Xi's petition, and thereafter created him the King of Min and gave him the titles of military governor (Jiedushi) of Weiwu Circuit (威武, headquartered at Changle)—a tradition title held by Min's rulers when in subordination to the central Chinese regimes—and honorary chancellor title of Zhongshu Ling (中書令). In 941, when Wang Yanzheng requested the title of military governor of Weiwu, Wang Xi declined to give him the title (citing the longstanding tradition of Weiwu being seated at Changle), but commissioned him as the military governor of a new Zhen'an Circuit (鎮安), to be headquartered at Jian. (Wang Yanzheng, though, did not like the name of Zhen'an, and therefore referred to himself as military governor of Zhenwu (鎮武).) Also in 941, Wang Xi commissioned his son Wang Yacheng as chancellor and the commander of the imperial guards. Later that year, suspecting an alliance between Wang Yanzheng and Wang Jiye (who was then serving as the prefect of Quan Prefecture (泉州, in modern Quanzhou, Fujian)), he summoned Wang Jiye back from Quan and forced Wang Jiye to commit suicide.

=== As Emperor of Min ===
In fall 941, Wang Xi claimed the title of emperor—although only the Huang (皇) component, not the full Huangdi (皇帝) title, and continued to also claim the title of military governor of Weiwu, apparently trying to maintain some resemblance of a vassal relationship to Later Jin. Meanwhile, even though he created Wang Yanzheng the Prince of Fusha, the military hostilities between him and Wang Yanzheng resumed, such that it was said that the side of roads between Changle and Jian were overlaid with bones from dead soldiers. Meanwhile, fearing that Wang Jiye's successor at Quan, Wang Jiyan (王繼嚴) (a son of Wang Yanjun's, and therefore also a nephew) was becoming popular with the people, he recalled Wang Jiyan and then poisoned Wang Jiyan to death. Shortly after, he created Wang Yacheng, who then carried the title of Prince of Langye, the Prince of Changle and made Wang Yacheng the military governor of Weiwu.

In winter 941, Wang Xi assumed the full title of Huangdi. In spring 942, he created Li Zhen's daughter—who, based on the sequence of events, he was likely to have married while still being a subject, as she was described to be the mother of Wang Yacheng—empress. It was said that she liked drinking and had a strong personality, such that Wang Xi both favored and feared her. Shortly after, he created Wang Yacheng the Prince of Min.

Meanwhile, the battles with Wang Yanzheng continued. In fall 942, Wang Xi sent emissaries carrying his personally written edicts, gold, money, and official commissions (to allow Wang Yanzheng to commission his subordinates as officials) to Wang Yanzheng, seeking peace, but Wang Yanzheng rejected the overture. Meanwhile, when another nephew, Wang Jirou (王繼柔), was unable to drink at a feast and secretly reduced the wine served him, Wang Xi became angry and put him to death, as well as the officer serving the wine to him.

In 942, there was a time when Wang Xi commissioned the chancellor Yu Tingying to be the prefect of Quan. Yu engaged in corruption upon arriving there, including taking women for himself while claiming that he was doing so under Wang Xi's orders, for the women to serve as consorts in Wang Xi's palace. When Wang Xi received reports of this, he sent imperial censors to investigate. In fear, Yu returned to Changle, trying to defend himself. Wang Xi was set to have him arrested, when Yu offered a large tribute of money. Wang Xi was pleased, and, after extracting a second tribute (on Empress Li's behalf), allowed Yu to return to Quan. Indeed, after this incident, the officials began to directly offer tributes to the empress. Subsequently, he even recalled Yu and made Yu a chancellor again. Around the same time, he also made his nephew Li Renyu (李仁遇) (the son of one of his sisters and the chancellor Li Min (李敏), and brother to Wang Jipeng's first wife) and Li Guangzhun (李光準) chancellors—in Li Renyu's case, because Li Renyu, who was described to be young and handsome, gained his favor by apparently having sexual relations with him.

In spring 943, Wang Yanzheng formally declared himself emperor of a breakaway state of Yin. Meanwhile, Wang Xi took the daughter of the general Shang Baoyin (尚保殷) and became infatuated with her due to her beauty. It was said that if he were drunk, he would do whatever Consort Shang asked him to do, whether it comes to killing people or sparing people. Around the same time, there was a time when someone offered a sword to him. This caused him to remember the incident involving Wang Tan during Wang Jipeng's reign, and he opened up Wang Tan's grave and cut Wang Tan's body into pieces.

In winter 943, there was a time when Wang Xi was giving one of his daughters away in marriage. When he realized that 12 of his imperial officials did not congratulate her, he had them caned. As the deputy chief imperial censor Liu Zan (劉贊) did not, until that occurred, indict them, he wanted to cane Liu as well. The official Zheng Yuanbi (鄭元弼) tried to intercede on Liu's behalf, and when Wang Xi stated, "Are you, lord, trying to be Wei Zheng?" Zheng responded, "I, your subject, treat Your Imperial Majesty as Emperor Taizong of Tang, and that is why I am trying to be Wei Zheng." Only then was Wang's anger soothed somewhat, and he released Liu, but Liu later died due to anxiety from this incident.

Early in 944, Li Bian's son and successor Li Jing wrote to both Wang Xi and Wang Yanzheng to rebuke them for their intrafamily family war. Wang Xi's return letter to Li Jing cited the examples of the Duke of Zhou's executions of his brothers the Lords of Guan and Cai and Emperor Taizong's killing of his brothers Li Jiancheng and Li Yuanji. Wang Yanzheng's return letter to Li Jing, however, was more confrontational, rebuking Li Jing's father Li Bian for usurping the throne of Southern Tang's predecessor state Wu. In anger, Li Jing cut off relations with Yin.

Meanwhile, over the years, Zhu Wenjin and Lian Chongyu had continued to be concerned that they would be killed on account of having killed Wang Jipeng. They became increasingly fearful after Wang Xi, while drunk, killed their associate Wei Conglang (魏從朗), and after Wang Xi recited in their presence, in one occasion, Bai Juyi's poem, which stated, "When it comes to matching people's hearts, one cannot have any expectations even when they were physically close." Meanwhile, Empress Li was jealous of the favor that Consort Shang had gained, and wanted to have Wang Xi killed so that her son Wang Yacheng could become emperor. She therefore sent information to Zhu and Lian that Wang Xi was suspicious of them. In spring 944, there was a time when Empress Li's father Li Zhen had fallen ill, and Wang Xi went to visit him. As Wang Xi rode a horse to Li Zhen's mansion, Zhu and Lian had the officer Qian Da (錢達) assassinate Wang Xi even as he was on the horse. They publicly declared that, given the cruel reigns that several straight Wang emperors had demonstrated, it was time for someone else—and Lian then declared Zhu the new emperor. They slaughtered the members of the Wang clan at Changle, including Empress Li and Wang Yacheng, although they still buried Wang Xi with ceremony due an emperor.

== Notes and references ==
- Old History of the Five Dynasties, vol. 134.
- New History of the Five Dynasties, vol. 68.
- Spring and Autumn Annals of the Ten Kingdoms, vol. 92.
- Zizhi Tongjian, vols. 282, 283, 284.

Chinese nobility
Preceded by Wang Jipeng (Emperor Kangzong)	King/Emperor of Min; 939–944	Succeeded by Zhu Wenjin
Preceded by Wang Jipeng (Emperor Kangzong)	Emperor of China (Northeastern/Southern Fujian); 939–944	Succeeded by Zhu Wenjin
Preceded by Wang Jipeng (Emperor Kangzong)	Rule of China (Northwestern Fujian) (de facto); 939–940	Succeeded by Wang Yanzheng
Preceded by Wang Jipeng (Emperor Kangzong)	Emperor of China (Northwestern Fujian) (de jure); 939–943	Succeeded by Wang Yanzheng
