= Wang Jipeng =

Emperor of Min from 935 to 939

Emperor Kangzong of Min 閩康宗
- Emperor of Min

Emperor of Min
- Reign: November 18, 935 - August 29, 939?
- Predecessor: Wang Yanjun
- Successor: Wang Yanxi
- Died: August 29, 939; Fuzhou, Min Kingdom
- Wife Empress: Lady Li; Empress Li Chunyan
- Issue: Unknown number of sons
Names
- Wáng Jìpéng (王繼鵬), later changed to Wáng Chǎng (王昶)
Era name and dates
- Tóngwéng (通文): 936 – August 29, 939
Posthumous name
- Emperor Shensheng Yingrui Wenming Guangwu Yingdao Dahong Xiao (神聖英睿文明廣武應道大弘孝皇帝)
Temple name
- Kāngzōng (康宗)
- House: Wang
- Dynasty: Min
- Father: Wang Yanjun
- Mother: Possibly Liu Hua

Wang Jipeng (Chinese: 王繼鵬) (died August 29, 939), used the name Wang Chang (王昶) from 935 to 939, also known by his temple name as the Emperor Kangzong of Min (閩康宗), was an emperor of Min during China's Five Dynasties and Ten Kingdoms period. He inherited the throne after his father Wang Yanjun (Emperor Huizong) was assassinated, possibly at his instigation. He himself was in turn killed in a coup headed by his uncle Wang Yanxi (Emperor Jingzong), who succeeded him.

== Background ==
It is not known when Wang Jipeng was born. Traditional sources indicated that he was the oldest son of his father Wang Yanjun (later known as Wang Lin during reign), but the tombstone of Wang Yanjun's first wife, Liu Hua, indicated that he was Wang Yanjun's second son, with one older brother Wang Jiyan (王繼嚴) and two younger brothers (at the time of Lady Liu's death in 930), Wang Jitao (王繼韜), and Wang Jigong (王繼恭). (The Spring and Autumn Annals of the Ten Kingdoms listed another younger brother, Wang Jirong (王繼鎔), who might have been born after Lady Liu's death.) At some point (may be before or during Wang Yanjun's reign), Wang Jipeng married his cousin Lady Li, the daughter of a sister of his father's and her husband, the official Li Min (李敏).

== During Wang Yanjun/Wang Lin's reign ==
As of 926, the Min state was ruled by Wang Jipeng's uncle Wang Yanhan. Around the new year 927, Wang Jipeng's father Wang Yanjun, and an adoptive brother of his (Wang Jipeng's uncle), Wang Yanbing, jointly overthrew Wang Yanhan, and Wang Yanbing then supported Wang Yanjun in taking over the Min realm, although he took no princely or higher title at the time, instead formally submitting to Later Tang as a vassal, using the title of acting military governor of Weiwu Circuit (威武, headquartered at Min's capital Fuzhou). Wang Yanjun later was created the Prince of Min by Later Tang's emperor Li Siyuan in 928,

As of 931, Wang Jipeng carried the title of deputy military governor of Weiwu. Around the new year 932, Wang Yanjun was persuaded by the sorcerer Chen Shouyuan (陳守元) that if he temporarily yielded his throne, he could rule as an emperor for 60 years. He therefore commissioned Wang Jipeng to temporarily oversee the matters of the state, while he himself formally became a Taoist monk. Two months later, Wang Yanjun resumed his reign.

In 933, Wang Yanjun claimed the title of Emperor of Min and changed his name to Wang Lin. He commissioned Li Min and Wang Jipeng to be his chancellors, each carrying the designation of Tong Zhongshu Menxia Pingzhangshi (同中書門下平章事). Wang Jipeng was additionally given the titles of You Pushe (右僕射, one of the heads of the executive bureau of government (尚書省, Shangshu Sheng), with Li Min serving as the other Pushe), and Zhongshu Shilang (中書侍郎, the deputy head of the legislative bureau (中書省, Zhongshu Sheng)). Later in the year, Wang Lin created Wang Jipeng the Prince of Fu and also gave him the title of director of Baohuang Palace (寶皇宮). Later in the year, when an earthquake struck Min, Wang Lin against yielded the throne briefly to study Taoism and had Wang Jipeng oversee the affairs of state, taking back the throne not long after.

Sometime after Wang Jipeng was created the Prince of Fu, Wang Lin commissioned the official Ye Qiao as his advisor. As Ye was learned and honest, Wang Jipeng honored Ye as if Ye were his teacher.

In 934, there was a time when the important Min city Jian Prefecture (建州, in modern Nanping, Fujian) came under attack by Min's northwestern neighbor Wu, whose general Jiang Yanhui (蔣延徽) put it under siege. When Wang Lin sent his generals Zhang Yanrou (張彥柔) and Wang Yanzong (王延宗) (his brother) to try to lift the siege on Jian, the soldiers refused to advance to Jian unless Wang Lin surrendered his corrupt and harsh chief of staff Xue Wenjie to them. Wang Jipeng and Wang Lin's mother (Wang Jipeng's grandmother) Empress Dowager Huang advocated that Wang Lin surrender Xue to them, and when Wang Lin could not decide, Wang Jipeng laid an ambush for Xue and arrested him, then delivered him to the soldiers resentful of him. They killed him and ate his flesh, and then set out for Jian. The Wu army then withdrew.

By 935, Wang Jipeng was carrying on an affair with Wang Lin's lady in waiting Li Chunyan. He went to beg Wang Lin's wife and empress Empress Chen Jinfeng to intercede with Wang Lin, so that he could have Li Chunyan. Wang Lin agreed, although he was displeased. This also displeased Wang Jipeng's younger brother Wang Jitao, who considered assassinating Wang Jipeng.

Later in the year, Wang Lin became seriously ill. As Wang Lin had become impotent due to a stroke earlier, Empress Chen carried on an affair with two of his close associates, Gui Shouming (歸守明) and Li Keyin (李可殷). As Li Keyin had falsely accused the imperial guard officer Li Fang (李倣), and Empress Chen's family member Chen Kuangsheng (陳匡勝) had disrespected Wang Jipeng, both Li Fang and Wang Jipeng were discontent with the situation, such that when Wang Lin's illness became more serious, Wang Jipeng became pleased, believing that he would be emperor next. Li Fang also came to believe that Wang Lin would not recover, and found an opportunity to assassinate Li Keyin. However, when Wang Lin then recovered slightly, Empress Chen informed him of what happened, and he decided to investigate Li Keyin's death. In fear, Li Fang started a mutiny and sent his soldiers into the palace. The soldiers gravely injured Wang Lin, whose ladies in waiting then decided to kill him to relieve his suffering. Li Fang and Wang Jipeng then killed Empress Chen, Chen Kuangsheng, another of Empress Chen's relatives Chen Shou'en (陳守恩), Gui, and Wang Jitao. Wang Jipeng then, claiming that it was the will of Empress Dowager Huang, took the throne and changed his name to Wang Chang.

== Reign ==
After taking the throne, Wang Chang nevertheless sent a report to then-Later Tang emperor Li Congke, in the status of a vassal, in which he only claimed to be the acting military governor of Weiwu, although internally, he continued to use imperial style, including issuing a general pardon and bestowing on Li Chunyan the imperial consort title of Xianfei (賢妃), while his wife Lady Li only carried the title of the Lady of Liang.

After Wang Chang took the throne, Li Fang, for some time, dominated the court scene, and gathered a group of elite soldiers under his command. Wang Chang secretly planned to eliminate Li Fang with several officers, headed by Li Yanhao (李延皓). Li Yanhao pretended to be a partisan in league with Li Fang, and Li Fang trusted him. Late in 935, when Li Fang went to the imperial meeting hall to greet the emperor, soldiers hidden by Wang and Li Yanhao ambushed and beheaded him, placing his head on the government gate. Li Fang's followers subsequently tried to attack the imperial government, but, failing, seized Li Fang's head and fled to Min's northern neighbor Wuyue. Wang Chang publicly denounced Li Fang for killing Wang Lin and Wang Jitao, and had his brother Wang Jiyan, now carrying the title of Prince of Jian, replace Li Fang in commanding the imperial guards. He also commissioned Ye Qiao as a chancellor. However, he became arrogant and rarely actually listened to Ye, and, after Ye tried to correct him on showing Consort Li too much favor while ignoring Lady Li, Wang Chang distanced himself from Ye, and subsequently forced Ye into retirement. He trusted Chen Shouyuan, and bestowed even more honors on Chen than his father Wang Lin did. He also discussed all the important matters of state with Chen, such that Chen was able to receive bribes and was visited by many visitors seeking his favor.

In 936, Wang created Consort Li empress, while honoring Empress Dowager Huang as grand empress dowager.

In 937, Wang built a Ziwei Palace (紫微宮) and adorned it with crystals. It was said that its construction efforts were several times that of his father's already opulent Baohuang Palace. He also sent many secret agents to the prefectures throughout the Min realm to spy on people. Later, after sorcerers informed him that there was a white dragon scene at Mount Luo (螺峰, north of Fuzhou), so he bought a White Dragon Temple (白龍寺) there. With all the constructions going on, the treasury was exhausted, so he coerced his deputy minister of civil service affairs, Cai Shoumeng (蔡守蒙), who was otherwise honest, into selling offices for money. He further issued edicts ordering that those who falsified their ages (to avoid labor) be caned on their back, and those who hid family members from censuses (to avoid taxes or conscription) be put to death. Those who tried to escape these penalties would have their families slaughtered. He also imposed heavy taxes on vegetables, chicken, and pigs.

Later in 937, Wang ordered his younger brother Wang Jigong, whom he had given the title of military governor of Weiwu, to submit a petition to Shi Jingtang, the emperor of Later Jin (which had overthrown and replaced Later Tang), reporting his own succession to the throne, and requesting that a liaison office be established at the Later Jin capital Kaifeng. (In other words, Wang Chang himself did not want to show personal subordination to Shi, but did want to show submission on a state-to-state basis.) Shi reacted by issuing an edict in 938, creating Wang Chang to be the King of Min (i.e., not emperor) and Wang Jigong the Prince of Linhai, sending his official Lu Sun (盧損) to deliver the edict. When Wang Chang heard this, he had his emissary Lin En (林恩) explain to the Later Jin chancellors that, because Wang Chang had claimed imperial title, he did not want to be created a king and did not want Later Jin's imperial emissary to come to his realm. When Lu nevertheless arrived in his realm in 939, Wang Chang refused to meet him and claimed to be ill, and instead had Wang Jigong serve as Lu's host. He nevertheless sent his official Zheng Yuanbi (鄭元弼) to accompany Lu back to Later Jin and to offer tributes to Shi.

Wang Chang had long been jealous of the good reputations that his uncles Wang Yanwu (王延武) and Wang Yanwang (王延旺) had. In 939, the sorcerer Lin Xing (林興), who had previous grudges with Wang Yanwu, falsely reported to Wang Chang that a god had reported that Wang Yanwu and Wang Yanwang were about to rebel. Without further investigation, Wang Chang had Wang Yanwu, Wang Yanwang, and their five sons killed. Believing in Chen Shouyuan's words, he built a temple dedicated to the Three Pure Ones inside the palace. He had the affairs of state decided by whatever Lin indicated that the gods decreed. Fearing the fact that Wang Jiyan was much supported by the soldiers, he relieved Wang Jiyan of his command and ordered him to change his name to Wang Jiyu (王繼裕), replacing him with Wang Jirong. Not long after, realizing that Lin had been deluding him, he exiled Lin.

Later in the year, a fire destroyed the northern palace.

Meanwhile, two elite palace guard corps, the Gongchen (拱宸) and the Anhe (按鶴), had been much favored by Wang Lin. However, after Wang Chang became emperor, he established another elite corps, then Chenwei (宸衛), giving them far greater rewards than the Gongchen and Anhe. This led to rumors that the Gongchen and Anhe soldiers were angry and wanted to rebel, causing him to consider sending them away to be stationed at Zhang (漳州, in modern Zhangzhou, Fujian) and Quan (泉州, in modern Quanzhou, Fujian) Prefectures, leading them to be fearful and resentful. He also repeatedly insulted their commanders, Zhu Wenjin and Lian Chongyu. Wang Chang was also causing his imperial clan members to be angry and fearful based on his killings within the clan, including his cousin Wang Jilong (王繼隆), after Wang Jilong was invited to his feast and offended him after becoming drunk. His uncle Wang Yanxi pretended to be insane in order to avoid disaster, and while he initially sent Wang Yanxi away to be a Taoist monk, he later recalled Wang Yanxi and put him under house arrest. After the northern palace was burned, and the arsonist could not be found, Wang Chang had Lian command the imperial guards in cleaning up the site — heavy labor that they were displeased about doing. He came to suspect Lian of being complicit in the arson and contemplated killing Lian; his imperial scholar Chen Tan (陳郯), however, informed Lian.

Upon being informed by Chen, Lian led the two corps to attack Changchun Palace (長春宮), where Wang Chang was at the time, while welcoming Wang Yanxi and declaring him emperor. The other imperial guard corps joined Lian's attack against the emperor, except for the Chenwei, which resisted. Wang Chang and Empress Li fled to the Chenwei Corps, but the Chenwei Corps was defeated in a battle. They escorted Wang Chang and Empress Li to flee north. However, when they reached Mount Wutong (梧桐嶺, north of Fuzhou), the corps scattered. Meanwhile, Wang Yanxi had sent his nephew (Wang Chang's cousin) Wang Jiye (王繼業), to chase Wang Chang down. Wang Chang first repelled the soldiers chasing him by killing them with arrows (as he was a good marksman), but eventually, with more soldiers arriving, he realized he could not escape, so he dropped his bow. He stated to Wang Jiye, "Where is your faithfulness as a subject, sir?" Wang Jiye responded, "If the ruler did not have the virtues of a ruler, how would a subject have the faithfulness of a subject? The new ruler is my uncle. The old ruler is my cousin? Who is closer, and who is farther?" Wang Chang spoke no more, and Wang Jiye took him back toward Changle (i.e., Fu Prefecture). However, on the way, he got Wang Chang drunk, and then killed him by strangulation. Empress Li, Wang Chang's sons, and Wang Jigong were also executed.

== Notes and references ==
- History of the Five Dynasties, vol. 134.
- New History of the Five Dynasties, vol. 68.
- Spring and Autumn Annals of the Ten Kingdoms, vol. 91.
- Zizhi Tongjian, vols. 277, 278, 279, 280, 281, 282.

Chinese nobility
| Preceded by Wang Yanjun (Emperor Huizong) | Emperor of Min; 935–939 | Succeeded by Wang Yanxi (Emperor Jingzong) |
