= Min (Ten Kingdoms) =

Ancient kingdom in modern day Fujian, China

Min 閩
- 909–945
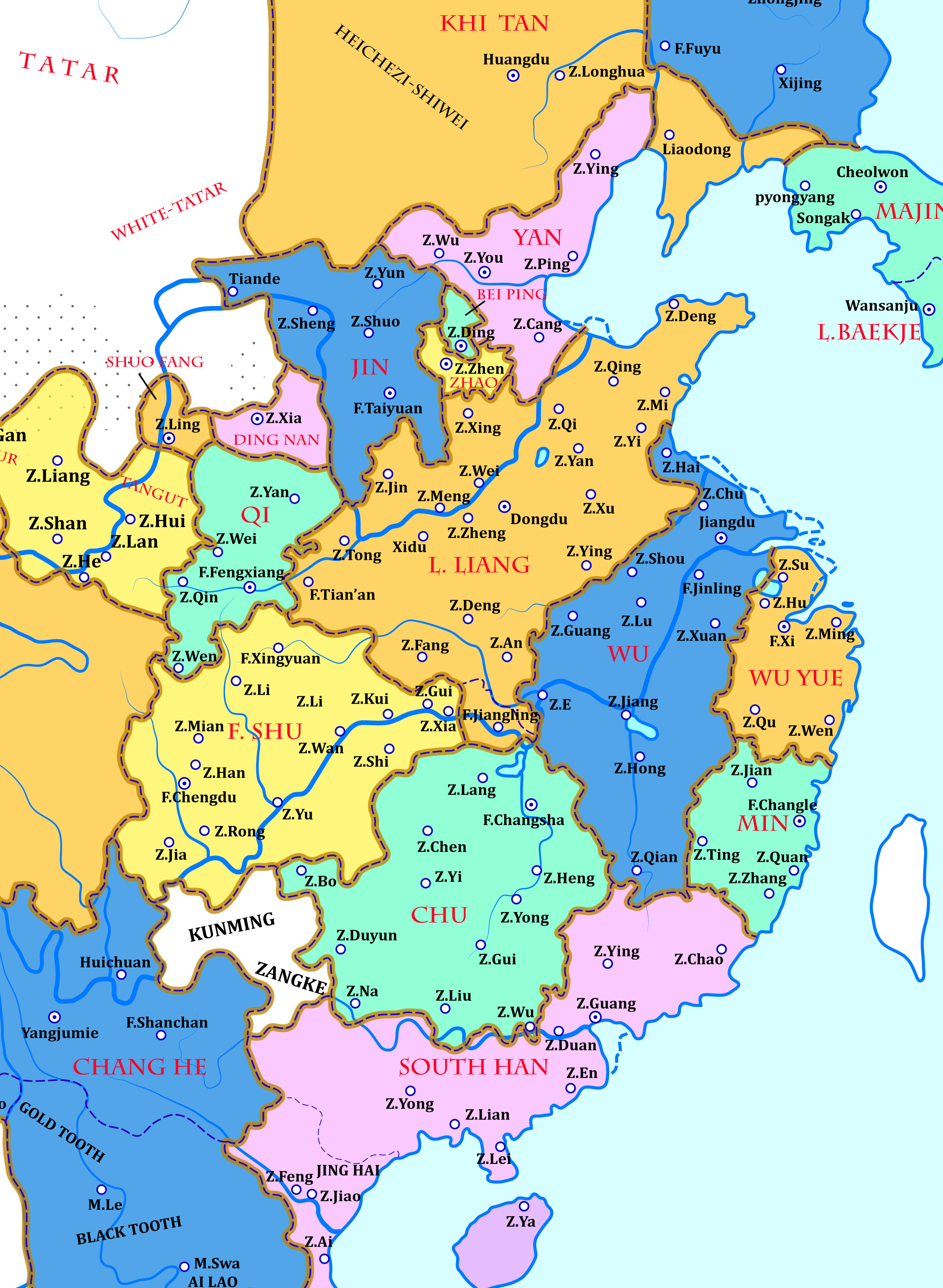
- Capital: Changle
- Common languages: Middle Chinese; Medieval Min
- Government: Monarchy
- King/Emperor
  - 909–925: Wang Shenzhi
  - 943–945: Wang Yanzheng
- Historical era: Five Dynasties and Ten Kingdoms Period
  - Wang Shenzhi became the Prince: 909
  - Wang Yanjun declared himself the Emperor: 933
  - Independence of Yin: 943
  - Ended by Southern Tang: 945
- Currency: Kaiyuan Tongbao; Longqi Tongbao; Yonghe Tongbao; Yonglong Tongbao; Tiande Zhongbao
Preceded by
Tang dynasty
Succeeded by
Southern Tang
Yin
Wuyue
- Today part of: China

Min
- Traditional Chinese: 閩國
- Simplified Chinese: 闽国
Transcriptions
Southern Min
- Hokkien POJ: Bân-kok
Eastern Min
- Fuzhou BUC: Mìng-guók

Min (Chinese: 閩; pinyin: Mǐn) was a dynastic kingdom in existence between the years of 909 and 945. It existed in a mountainous region of modern-day Fujian province of China and had a history of quasi-independent rule. Its capital was Fuzhou. It was founded by Wang Shenzhi (Emperor Taizu).

== Rulers of Min ==
Sovereigns in Min (Ten Kingdoms) Kingdom in 909–945 (including Yin (943–945))
Temple Names	Posthumous Names	Personal Names	Period of Reigns	Era Names and dates
Tàizǔ (太祖)	Zhōngyì Wáng (忠懿王)	Wáng Shěnzhī (王審知)	909–925	Adopted the era name of Later Tang
None	Siwang (嗣王)	Wáng Yánhàn (王延翰)	925–926	Adopted the era name of Later Tang
Hùizōng (惠宗)	Qísù Míngxiào Huángdì (齊肅明孝皇帝)	Wáng Yànjūn (王延鈞)	926–935	Adopted the era name of Later Tang 926–935; Lóngqǐ (龍啟) 933–935 Yǒnghé (永和) 935
Kāngzōng (康宗)	Too tedious thus not used when referring to this sovereign	Wáng Jìpéng (王繼鵬)	935–939	Tōngwén (通文) 936–939
Jǐngzōng (景宗)	Too tedious thus not used when referring to this sovereign	Wáng Yánxī (王延羲)	939–944	Yǒnglóng (永隆) 939–944
None	None	Zhū Wénjìn (朱文進)	944–945	Adopted the era name of Later Jin
None	Fugong yiwang (福恭懿王) (both as Emperor of Yin and Emperor of Min)	Wáng Yánzhèng (王延政)	943–945	Tiāndé (天德) 943–945

== Rulers family tree of Min ==
Min rulers family tree

Wang Nin 王恁
Wang Chao 王潮 b. 846–d. 898	Wang Shenzhi 王審知 b. 862–d. 925; Tàizǔ 太祖 r. 909–925	Wang Shengui 王審邽 b. 858–d. 904
Wang Yanhan 王延翰 r. 925–926; d. 927	Wang Yanjun 王延鈞 d. 935; Huìzōng 惠宗 r. 927–935	Wang Yanxi 王延羲 d. 944; Jǐngzōng (景宗) r. 939–944	Wang Yanzheng 王延政 d. 951; Tiande Emperor (天德帝) r. 943–945
Wang Jipeng 王繼鵬 d. 939; Kāngzōng (康宗) r. 935–939
