= Southern Tang conquest of Min =

Conflict in Fujian during the Five Dynasties and Ten Kingdoms period

Date	945–947
Location	Modern Fujian
Result	Min Kingdom partitioned; Wuyue gained Fuzhou.; Southern Tang secured Jianzhou and Tingzhou.; Qingyuan Jiedushi established.

Belligerents
Southern Tang	Min Kingdom	Fuzhou Wuyue allies

Commanders and leaders
Li Jing; Zha Wenhui (查文徽); Chen Jue; Feng Yanlu	Wang Yanzheng (surrendered); Yang Sigong (executed); Chen Wang (陳望) †; Liu Congxiao (surrendered)	Li Renda; Yang Chongbao (楊崇保) Qian Hongzuo; Bao Xiurang (鮑修讓)

Strength
Unknown	Unknown	40,000

Casualties and losses
20,000	Unknown	Unknown

The Southern Tang conquest of the Min Kingdom was a conflict in modern Fujian during the Five Dynasties and Ten Kingdoms period of China. Civil war erupted in Min during the reign of Wang Yanxi. His brother Wang Yanzheng launched a rebellion in 943 and established Yin. The Southern Tang failed to mediate between the Wang Brothers and prepared to invade their territories.

In 944 the upstart Zhu Wenjin executed Wang Yanxi. A revolt incited by Wang Yanzheng deposed Zhu in February 945, reuniting Min and Yin shortly before the impending attack by Li Jing. The defending Min forces were led into an engagement by Yang Sigong that ended in disastrous rout. Southern Tang armies soon encircled Jianzhou. Outside help wasn't forthcoming and the trapped Wang Yanzheng surrendered in October 945.

Initially the Southern Tang appeared to have successfully incorporated Min within their empire. This situation quickly changed after Chen Jue instigated the Battle of Fuzhou with Li Renda. The besieged port city received Wuyue relief forces which in 947 forced the Southern Tang to withdraw. The former Min kingdom became partitioned as the Wuyue secured their gains around Fuzhou.

== Background ==
In 940 Wang Yanzheng revolted against his brother Wang Yanxi. Li Bian mediated between the feuding Wang Brothers. He was motivated to end the conflict quickly lest Wuyue take advantage of the civil war and seize territories near the Southern Tang border. This peace didn't last long and Min was torn apart from further feuding between the siblings. In 943 Yanzheng seized the northwest regions of Min and formed the Kingdom of Yin.

Li Jing initially pressed for the brothers to stop feuding as his father had done previously. Yet both of them refused this attempt at mediation. Yanzheng sent a particularly provocative response. Consequently, Li Jing ordered for Yin and Min territories to be forcibly incorporated into his realm.

In April 944 Zhu Wenjin and Lian Chongyu dethroned Wang Yanxi. Zhu sent emissaries to try to establish friendly relations with the Southern Tang. Li Jing put his emissaries under arrest and intended to attack him, but could not do so immediately due to the heat and spread of disease at the time.

Min officials executed Zhu Wenjin in February 945. The throne was offered to Wang Yanzheng, reuniting the split kingdoms. At this point the Southern Tang invasion was imminent. Wang Yangzheng continued to rule from Jianzhou rather than the Min capital of Changle and prepared his forces for the coming attack. He put his nephew Wang Jichang in command of Fuzhou.

== Invasion ==
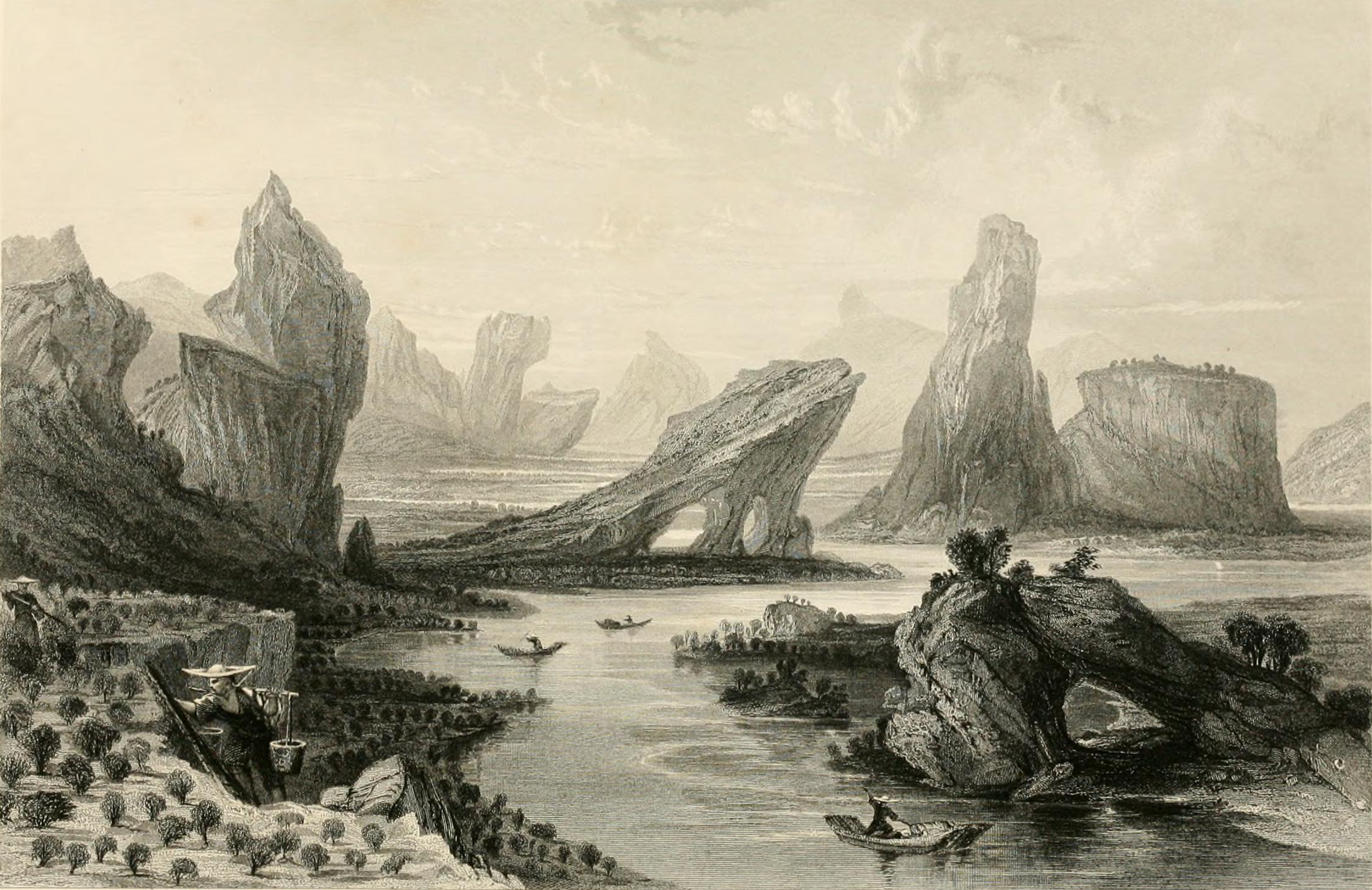
The Wuyi Mountains of modern Fujian. The Southern Tang campaign against Wang Yanzheng took place nearby.

Zha Wenhui (查文徽) was appointed to lead the Southern Tang invasion. A merchant gave valuable intelligence on traversing the mountainous terrain of Min. In early 945 the Southern Tang armies began to cross into Min territory. Wang Yanzheng enlisted Yang Sigong to lead the counterattack the Southern Tang.

For over a week the rival forces encamped on either side of a river without combat. Yang Sigong became impatient and ordered an army under Chen Wang (陳望) to cross the river and attack the Southern Tang. In the ensuing battle Chen Wang died and Min forces suffered a disastrous rout. Afterwards Zha Wenhui captured Jianyang. The Southern Tang advanced onto Jianzhou and encircled the city. A Min relief force dispatched from Quanzhou failed to break the siege. Wang Yanzheng was desperate for help and offered to become a vassal of Wuyue.

Rebellion by Min military officers broke out in two major port cities. Li Renda murdered Wang Jichang and seized Fuzhou. The Min official in control of Quanzhou was killed by Liu Congxiao. Both men contacted Zha Wenhui with pledges of loyalty to the Southern Tang. The Southern Tang continued their attack on Jianzhou, which finally fell on 2 October 945. Wang Yanzheng was captured and deported to Jinling. The majority of Min territory was now under Southern Tang rule. Yang Sigong was executed to placate the discontented populous of Jianzhou.

== Battle of Fuzhou ==
The affluent port of Fuzhou was controlled by Li Renda, who initially submitted to the Southern Tang. After a cold reception from Li Renda, Chen Jue fabricated orders for Southern Tang armies to attack Fuzhou. The neighboring Wuyue sent relief forces on naval transports after Qian Hongzuo received an appeal from the embattled Li Renda. In 947 the opposing forces clashed in a pitched battle where the Southern Tang lost over 20,000 troops and were forced to withdraw.

== Aftermath ==
While the Southern Tang were successful in deposing Wang Yanzheng they did not accomplish all of their strategic goals. They gained control of the Jianzhou and Tingzhou prefectures but were forced out of Fuzhou by the neighboring Wuyue. The Quanzhou and Zhangzhou prefectures were controlled by a former Min officer, Liu Congxiao. Li Jing appointed him the Jiedushi of Qingyuan Circuit, which largely operated autonomously from the Southern Tang.

In subsequent months the Southern Tang court debated the proper punishment for those involved with the Battle of Fuzhou. Subordinate officers were declared innocent but the fate of Chen Jue and his cohorts remained to be determined. Both he and Feng Yanlu were forced to wear shackles for their trip to Jinling on the orders of an irate Li Jing. Song Qiqiu had originally promoted Chen and took the blame for the latter's actions. Along with Feng Yanji, Song convinced the emperor to merely exile Chen and Feng Yanlu. Han Xizai and Xu Xuan (徐鉉) wrote a memorial demanding that Chen Jue and Feng Yanlu be executed. They stated that if military officials weren't punished for deploying troops without prior court approval "then there will be unrest in the border regions." This notion was undoubtedly informed by the disintegration of the Tang dynasty, where autonomous Jiedushi officials acted without imperial oversight.

Many expenses were incurred during the conflict that depleted the Southern Tang treasuries. Granaries were burdened with supplying the Southern Tang armies which left people in the Fuzhou (in modern Jiangxi), Hongzhou, Raozhou, and Xinzhou prefectures particularly destitute. Despite difficulties experienced during the campaign officials such as Feng Yanji encouraged Li Jing to aspire for further territorial aggrandizement. In 951 the Southern Tang campaign against Chu began, a venture that ended largely in failure.

== Bibliography ==
=== Premodern sources ===
- Sima, Guang (1084). Zīzhì Tōngjiàn (in Chinese) – via Wikisource.
- Ling, Ma 馬令 (n.d.e). Mǎ Shì Nán Táng Shū (in Chinese) – via Wikisource.
- Ouyang, Xiu (1073). Wǔdài Shǐjì (in Chinese) – via Wikisource.

=== Books ===
- Kurz, Johannes L. (2011). China's Southern Tang Dynasty (937–976). Routledge. ISBN 9780415454964.
- Kurz, Johannes (1997). "The Yangzi in the Negotiations between the Southern Tang and Its Northern Neighbors (Mid-Tenth Century)". In Dabringhaus, Sabine; Ptak, Roderich; Teschke, Richard (eds.). China and Her Neighbours: Borders, Visions of the Other, Foreign Policy 10th to 19th Century. South China and maritime Asia. Vol. 6. Wiesbaden: Harrassowitz. ISBN 3447039426.
- Mote, F. W. (1999). Imperial China (900–1800). Harvard University Press. ISBN 0674012127.
- Ouyang, Xiu (2004). Historical Records of the Five Dynasties. Translated by Davis, Richard L. New York: Columbia University Press. ISBN 0-231-12826-6.
- Worthy, Edmund H. (1983). "Diplomacy for Survival: Domestic and Foreign Relations of Wu Yüeh, 907–978". In Rossabi, Morris (ed.). China among Equals: The Middle Kingdom and Its Neighbors, 10th–14th Centuries. Berkley and Los Angeles: University of California Press. pp. 17–46. ISBN 0520043839.

=== Articles ===
- Kurz, Johannes (1998). "The Invention of a "Faction" in Song Historical Writings on the Southern Tang". Society for Song, Yuan, and Conquest Dynasty Studies. 28 (28): 1–35. JSTOR 23496061.

=== Theses ===
- Krompart, Robert J. (1973). The Southern Restoration of T'ang: Counsel, Policy, and Parahistory in the Stabilization of the Chiang-Huai Region, 887–943 (PhD thesis). University of California, Berkeley.
- Woolley, Nathan (2010). Religion and Politics in the Writings of Xu Xuan (917–92) (PhD thesis). Australian National University.
