= Battle of Fuzhou (Five Dynasties period) =

Part of the Southern Tang conquest of Min

- Part of Southern Tang conquest of Min
Date	946–947
Location	Fuzhou
Result	Southern Tang siege defeated, Fuzhou becomes a vassal of Wuyue

Belligerents
Southern Tang	Fuzhou	Wuyue

Commanders and leaders
Wang Chongwen (王崇文); Chen Jue; Feng Yanlu; Liu Congxiao	Li Renda; Li Hongtong (李弘通); Yang Chongbao (楊崇保)	Zhang Yun (張筠); Zhao Chengtai (趙承泰); Yu An (余安)

Strength
Unknown	10,000	30,000

Casualties and losses
20,000	Unknown	Unknown

The Battle of Fuzhou was a major military engagement during the Southern Tang conquest of Min. The Southern Tang took advantage of instability in the Min Kingdom and launched an invasion in 945. During the campaign Li Renda seized Fuzhou and pledged loyalty to the Southern Tang. After a hostile reception by Li Renda, Chen Jue forged documents that called for the capture of Fuzhou. Infuriated at the insubordination, Emperor Li Jing nonetheless sent reinforcements. Fuzhou became encircled by the Southern Tang armies.

Li Renda sought the military aid of Wuyue. Qian Hongzuo dispatched Wuyue troops during winter 946 and further reinforcements arrived in spring 947. Wuyue armies combined with the Fuzhou garrison to kill over 20,000 Southern Tang troops in a pitched battle. The Southern Tang retreated and the siege was lifted. Li Renda contemplated rebelling against his Wuyue suzerains but was killed by the Wuyue commander Bao Xiurang. Fuzhou remained a possession of the Wuyue Kingdom until its incorporation into the Song dynasty in 978.

== Background ==
During the early 940s civil war erupted in the Min Kingdom between members of the royal Wang family. Li Jing took advantage of the situation organized the Southern Tang conquest of Min. Wang Yanzheng successfully reunited the Min realm in February 945. At this point the Southern Tang invasion was imminent. Wang Yangzheng continued to rule from Jianzhou rather than the Min capital of Changle and marshaled his forces for the coming attack.

In preparation for the Southern Tang invasion Wang Jichang in command of Fuzhou, a prosperous entrepôt for imported valuable goods originating from across South East Asia. A rebellion broke out in Fuzhou as the Southern Tang advanced on Jianzhou. Li Renda successfully seized Fuzhou, executed Wang Jichang, and installed Zhuo Yanming as a figurehead emperor. He later conspired with soldiers in July 945 to assassinate Zhuo and claimed to be the acting military governor of Weiwu Circuit (威武). The Southern Tang encircled Jianzhou and Wang Yanzheng surrendered in October 945. The Min realm, Fuzhou included, at least nominally submitted to Li Jing.

The prefect of Quanzhou and member of the Min imperial clan, Wang Jixun (王繼勳), offered to establish friendly relations with Li Renda. This offer was refused as traditionally Quanzhou was subordinate to the military governor of Weiwu. In late spring 946 Li Renda ordered his brother Li Hongtong (李弘通) to seize Quanzhou. Wang Jixun was deposed by Liu Congxiao who took over Quanzhou and repelled the invading forces under Li Hongtong.

After gaining control over the Min domain, Southern Tang officers pressed for launching a siege from Jianzhou. Emperor Li Jing was content to leave the port and preferred peaceful strategems to gain the city. He gave Li Renda the new name of Li Hongyi and confirmed his position as the military governor of Weiwu. Li Hongyi's mother and wife received titles along with his four younger brothers gaining bureaucratic appointments in the Southern Tang regime. Controlling the brisk maritime trade of the port city would bolster the tax revenues collected by the Southern Tang government.

Chen Jue was sent as an envoy to invite Li Hongyi to visit the Southern Tang capital of Jinling. The reception went poorly as Li Hongyi treated him disrespectfully, making Chen fearing for his life. He left Fuzhou without even bringing up the matter of summoning him to Jinling. Embarrassed at his failure, Chen forged edicts that ostensibly gave him control over forces statione across Fujian. He directed Feng Yanlu to assemble the prefectural troops of Fuzhou (in modern Jiangxi), Jianzhou, Tingzhou, and Xinzhou to march on Fuzhou.

== Conflict begins ==
Li Hongyi resisted surrender and sent Yang Chongbao (楊崇保) to attack the Southern Tang army. On 18 September 946 this Fuzhou detachment was defeated in Houguan prefecture. The following day the Southern Tang forces arrived outside Fuzhou. Li Hongyi mounted an attack and was able to defeat Chen Jue and Feng Yansi.

Li Jing was furious at the flagrant insubordination of Chen Jue and his cohorts but did not punish him on the advice of Feng Yanji. Instead of ending the conflict, the Southern Tang became fully committed to attacking Fuzhou. General Wang Chongwen (王崇文) was appointed commander of the Southern Tang forces sieging Fuzhou. The outer city quickly fell when his reinforcements arrived but the advance bogged down as Li Hongyi defended the inner city. The Southern Tang armies were hampered by a lack of coordination. Wang Chongwen was the overall commander but Chen Jue, Feng Yanlu, and Wei Cen (魏岑) all tried to issue orders independently of him. Liu Congxiao and Wang Jianfeng (王建封) were also not obedient of commands by Wang Chongwen.

== Outside intervention ==
The embattled port city sought assistance from other Chinese powers. In October 946, Li Hongyi changed his name to Li Hongda to show a break with Southern Tang. He sought the help of the Later Jin and became their vassal. Emperor Shi Chonggui commissioned him the military governor of Weiwu and the overseer of the state of Min. Actual military action didn't materialize as Shi Chonggui sent no military forces to assist Fuzhou. Some of the Southern Tang forces were tied down in a revolt in nearby Zhang Prefecture by Lin Zanyao. These rebels were defeated in November. On 19 November Fuzhou became fully encircled by the besieging Southern Tang forces.

The Wuyue Kingdom was contacted for military aid. To avoid a naming taboo for Wuyue's king Qian Hongzuo, Li Hongda changed his name to Li Da. The Wuyue government was largely against mounting an expedition to Fuzhou. Only one court eunuch who supported Qian Zuo in joining in the conflict. In December against the counsel of his military officers, Qian Zuo sent 30,000 troops on naval transports under the command of Zhang Yun (張筠) and Zhao Chengtai (趙承泰). On 18 December, they arrived at Fuzhou and defended the eastern Dongwu Gate. However, the Wuyue relief forces were unable to break the siege. The city lost access to its access to the food resources of outlying areas.

In 947, when Wuyue reinforcements under general Yu An (余安) arrived they were allowed to disembark unopposed by Feng Yanlu, who was keen to fight a pitched battle for prestige and material rewards. Southern Tang troops stationed south of Fuzhou were struck by forces on two fronts and lost over 20,000 troops. Embarrassed at his erroneous command, Feng Yanlu attempted suicide, but was prevented from doing so by his assistants. A complete rout was prevented by Wang Chongwen, who ordered 300 soldiers to assume a defensive position at his headquarters. Additional troops joined the formation and the Wuyue didn't press their attack. Nonetheless, Southern Tang forces south of Fuzhou were forced to withdraw. Soon afterwards the remaining Southern Tang troops encamped north of Fuzhou departed, ending the conflict.

== Aftermath ==
In subsequent months the Southern Tang court debated the proper punishment for those involved with the conflict. Subordinate officers were declared innocent but the fate of Chen Jue and his cohorts remained to be determined. Both he and Feng Yanlu were forced to wear shackles for their trip to Jinling on the orders of an irate Li Jing. Song Qiqiu had originally promoted Chen and took the blame for the latter's actions. Along with Feng Yanji, Song convinced the emperor to merely exile Chen and Feng Yanlu. Han Xizai and Xu Xuan (徐鉉) wrote a memorial demanding that Chen Jue and Feng Yanlu be executed. They stated that if military officials weren't punished for deploying troops without prior court approval "then there will be unrest in the border regions." This notion was undoubtedly informed by the disintegration of the Tang dynasty, where autonomous jiedushi officials acted without imperial oversight.

Following the Southern Tang defeat, Yu An established a garrison of Wuyue troops in Fuzhou and was later replaced by Bao Xiurang (鮑修讓). In July 947 Li Da went to the Wuyue capital of Qiantang to pay homage to the newly enthroned Qian Hongzong. While granted titles and the new name of Li Ruyun, he wasn't authorized to leave Qiantong until Hu Jinsi was bribed with 20 gold bamboo shoots to secure approval. Once back in Fuzhou he considered revolting in favor of the Southern Tang. Before Li Ruyun could rebel Bao Xiurang became aware of his plans and killed him. Qian Hongzong subsequently sent chancellor Wu Cheng as the new military governor of Weiwu.

Southern Tang officers stationed at Jianzhou were given false information in March 950 of the Wuyue garrison departing from Fuzhou. An army sent to capture the supposedly vacant city instead found it well defended. The Wuyue garrison general then lured the adversarial army in falling for a trap and inflicted heavy losses. Surviving remnants of the Southern Tang fled back to Jianzhou. Fuzhou remained a possession of the Wuyue Kingdom until its incorporation into the Song dynasty in 978.

== Bibliography ==
=== Premodern sources ===
- Sima, Guang (1084). Zīzhì Tōngjiàn (in Chinese) – via Wikisource.
- Ouyang, Xiu (1073). Wǔdài Shǐjì (in Chinese) – via Wikisource.

=== Books ===
- Kurz, Johannes L. (2011). China's Southern Tang Dynasty (937–976). Routledge. ISBN 9780415454964.
- Ouyang, Xiu (2004). Historical Records of the Five Dynasties. Translated by Davis, Richard L. New York: Columbia University Press. ISBN 0-231-12826-6.
- Worthy, Edmund H. (1983). "Diplomacy for Survival: Domestic and Foreign Relations of Wu Yüeh, 907–978". In Rossabi, Morris (ed.). China among Equals: The Middle Kingdom and Its Neighbors, 10th–14th Centuries. Berkley and Los Angeles: University of California Press. pp. 17–46. ISBN 0520043839.

=== Articles ===
- Kurz, Johannes (1998). "The Invention of a 'Faction' in Song Historical Writings on the Southern Tang". Society for Song, Yuan, and Conquest Dynasty Studies. 28 (28): 1–35. JSTOR 23496061.
