= Zhou Zong =

Zhou Zong (周宗), courtesy name Juntai (君太), was an official of the Chinese Five Dynasties and Ten Kingdoms period state Southern Tang. Zhou was a close associate of its founding emperor Emperor Liezu and thus was honored by Emperor Liezu (Xu Zhigao/Li Bian) and his son and successor Emperor Yuanzong (Xu Jingtong/Li Jing). His two daughters became successive empresses (known as Empress Zhou the Elder and Empress Zhou the Younger) for Emperor Yuanzong's son and successor, Southern Tang's final emperor Li Yu (often known as Li Houzhu).

== During Wu ==
Zhou Zong's birth date is not clearly stated in history — although he was said to be in his 70s at the time of his death during the Later Zhou invasion against Southern Tang, which was launched in 956 and ended in 958 in Southern Tang's submission to Later Zhou as a vassal — placing somewhat of a timeframe around the time of his birth. His family was from Guangling. In his youth late in the Tang dynasty, there were great disturbances in the region. As a result, he lost his parents, and he was poor. During Wu (one of the successor states of Tang after Tang fell, which ruled over, inter alia, Zhou's home city of Guangling and had Guangling as its capital), Zhou came to serve under the general Xu Zhigao, an adoptive son of Xu Wen, Wu's regent, as Xu Zhigao's supply officer. Zhou was said to be particularly appropriate in protocols and wording, and served Xu Zhigao well, thus causing Xu Zhigao to greatly favor him.

When Xu Wen died in 927 at Jinling, Zhou was at Jinling. Xu Zhigao's younger brother (Xu Wen's then-oldest-surviving biological son) Xu Zhixun — who was then in a power struggle with Xu Zhigao over who would effectively succeed Xu Wen as Wu's paramount regent — told Zhou to inform Xu Zhigao, who was then in Guangling serving as junior regent over the regime of Wu's king (but who would soon thereafter declare himself emperor, following Xu Wen's final petition before death that he does so) Yang Pu, that there was no need for him to attend the funeral proceedings and that it was more important for him to pay attention to the affairs of the state. Zhou insisted that Xu Zhixun write this down in a letter, so Xu Zhixun did so. When Xu Wen's other biological sons were displeased that Xu Zhigao did not attend the funeral, Zhou showed the letter to them, and Xu Zhixun was unable to argue against what he himself had written.

After Xu Wen's death, the power over the Wu realm effectively became divided between Xu Zhigao and Xu Zhixun, with Xu Zhigao in control of the imperial government at Guangling, but Xu Zhixun in control of the large army that Xu Wen had commanded at Jinling. Given Xu Zhixun's military strength, Xu Zhigao feared him, but Xu Zhixun's arrogance alienated his younger brothers. Meanwhile, Xu Zhixun was not curbing his actions properly; for example, when Qian Liu, the king of Wu's neighbor Wuyue, sent Xu Zhixun gifts of vessels and saddles adorn with dragons and phoenixes — which only the sovereign could use — Xu Zhixun used them, making no attempts to avoid making them into a display. His close associate Zhou Tingwang (周廷望) persuaded him to let Zhou Tingwang take large amounts of wealth to Guangling to try to use them to bribe other high level officials to turn from Xu Zhigao and toward him, but when Zhou arrived at Guangling, Zhou Tingwang, who was friendly with Zhou Zong, secretly pledged allegiance to Xu Zhigao through Zhou Zong, and informed Xu Zhixun's actions to Xu Zhigao — but then, when he returned to Jinling, also informed Xu Zhigao's actions to Xu Zhixun, trying to play both sides. Zhou Zong told Zhou Tingwang to inform Xu Zhixun that he had been accused of seven major crimes and should go to the capital to defend himself. Xu Zhixun believed Zhou Tingwang, and therefore went to Guangling. Once he arrived there, Xu Zhigao detained him and did not allow him to return to Jinling, sending the officer Ke Hou (柯厚) to lead the Jinling forces back to Guangling, thus consolidating the command under Xu Zhigao himself.

In 933, by which time Xu Zhigao himself had his headquarters at Jinling with his son Xu Jingtong serving as junior regent at Guangling, Xu Zhigao's chief strategist Song Qiqiu, who was then a chancellor, suggested that the Wu capital be moved from Guangling to Jinling. Xu Zhigao thus began palace construction projects at Jinling. However, the project to move the capital was not popular with the people, and Zhou Zong pointed out to Xu Zhigao that if he moved the imperial government from Guangling to Jinling, then, because of Guangling's importance, he would have to move his own headquarters from Jinling to Guangling, effectively doubling the expense of the movement. The project was therefore cancelled.

Meanwhile, Xu Zhigao had long considered seizing the Wu throne for himself, but because Yang was known for carefulness, he did not want to take the potentially unpopular action of seizing the throne from him, and therefore wanted to wait until after Yang's reign — a course of action that Song agreed with. However, one day, in Zhou's presence, Xu Zhigao was plucking white facial hair from his face and stating, "The state is secure, but I am getting old." Zhou, who was then serving as the operations officer for Xu Zhigao's headquarters, realized that Xu Zhigao had the intent of taking the throne, and therefore volunteered to head to Guangling to hint to Yang to yield the throne and to inform Song. Xu Zhigao agreed — without first consulting with Song. When Zhou informed this to Yang and Song, Song became jealous of Zhou's doing so, and therefore not only opposed the action but further requested that Zhou be put to death, as an apology to Yang. Xu Zhigao, not wanting to turn against Song's suggestions at this point, while not putting Zhou to death, demoted him out of the headquarters to serve as the deputy military prefect of Chi Prefecture (池州, in modern Chizhou, Anhui). However, later, Xu Zhigao's other officers Li Jianxun and Xu Jie (徐玠) came to opine the same way as Zhou did, and therefore Xu Zhigao recalled Zhou back to headquarters to again serve as operations officer, while beginning to distance himself from Song. In 937, when, as part of the preparation for the transition, Yang created Xu Zhigao the Prince of Qi and Xu Zhigao began to build a government on the scale of the imperial government, he commissioned Zhou Zong and Zhou Tingyu (周廷玉) to serve as his chiefs of staff (內樞使, Neishushi) (analogous to the Shumishi positions of the other states at the time, but not using the character mi (密) to observe naming taboo for Wu's founder Yang Xingmi).

== During Southern Tang ==
=== During Emperor Liezu's reign ===
Zhou Zong continued to serve as Neishushi after Yang formally yielded the throne to Xu Zhigao (who then changed his name to Li Bian, as his original family name was Li) later in 937, ending Wu and starting Southern Tang as its Emperor Liezu. It was said that Emperor Liezu often held feasts for Zhou, treatment that other officials and generals did not receive except for Song Qiqiu and Ma Renyu (馬仁裕). Despite this display of imperial favor, Zhou was said to be careful in his actions, living frugally and not using much of what Emperor Liezu awarded him, thus not allowing Song (who continued to bear grudges against him due to his first suggesting to Emperor Liezu of taking the throne) and his partisans to have any chance to accuse him of improprieties. At some point, he was apparently made the military governor (Jiedushi) of Fenghua Circuit (奉化, headquartered in modern Jiujiang, Jiangxi).

=== During Emperor Yuanzong's reign ===
In 943, Emperor Liezu died, and was succeeded by his son Li Jing (i.e., Xu Jingtong) the Prince of Qi (as Emperor Yuanzong). Wanting to use the reputations of Song Qiqiu and Zhou Zong, as his father's senior advisors, to enhance his own reign, he recalled Song (who was then the military governor of Zhennan Circuit (鎮南, headquartered in modern Nanchang, Jiangxi) and Zhou from their military governor posts, to both serve as chancellors — in Zhou's case, Zhou was given the title of Shizhong (侍中), the head of the examination bureau of government (門下省, Menxia Sheng). It was said that, by this point, in his old age, Zhou was careful, and Emperor Yuanzong respected him greatly. However, Song and his partisans were still resentful of Zhou and wanted to destroy Zhou. When a weeping Zhou informed Emperor Yuanzong about this, Emperor Yuanzong lost some of his respect for Song. He sent Song to Zhenhai Circuit (鎮海, headquartered in modern Zhenjiang, Jiangsu), and then approved Song's petition for retirement.

In 944, Emperor Yuanzong made Zhou the military governor of Zhennan. One of Zhou's staff members was a long-time staffer named Yu Wenzhen (俞文貞), who had also served on Emperor Liezu's staff early in Emperor Liezu's career as a Wu official and when both Zhou and Ma Renyu were low-level officers. When the staff members welcomed Zhou to the post, Yu made the abrupt remark of, "How is Chief Ma doing?" (referring to Ma by his previously low rank). Zhou responded, "Chancellor Ma is currently defending Lu Prefecture [(廬州, in modern Hefei, Anhui)])." Yu just looked at his fellow staff members and smiled. On a subsequent day, when Zhou held a feast for his staff members, when Zhou was offering wine to the staff members, Yu took his hand and then stated, "Lord Chancellor, you know that your subordinate does not drink much." Yu's overly familiar actions took the other staff members by surprise, but Zhou was not dismayed, and it was said that this showed Zhou's tolerance.

Zhou was subsequently made the military governor of Ningguo Circuit (寧國, headquartered in modern Xuancheng, Anhui). In 950, Emperor Yuanzong made him the defender of the eastern capital Jiangdu (i.e., Guangling, with the imperial capital then at Jinling). He later requested retirement due to old age, and was allowed to retire with the title of Situ (司徒, one of the Three Excellencies). When Feng Yanlu, who succeeded Zhou as Jiangdu's defender, subsequently was captured by Later Zhou forces in the Later Zhou invasion in 956, the people came to regard Zhou as being fortunate. He died shortly after, in his 70s. Despite their prior animosity, Song mourned him bitterly, touching his coffin and stating, "Sir, you are of great wisdom. You came at the right time, and left at the right time." His two daughters (Zhou Ehuang and another whose name is lost to history, both by his second wife) later successively became empresses during the reign of Emperor Yuanzong's son Li Yu.

== Notes and references ==
=== Sources ===
- (in Chinese) Wu Renchen (1669). Shiguo Chunqiu (十國春秋) [Spring and Autumn Annals of the Ten Kingdoms]. vol. 21.
- (in Chinese) Sima Guang (1086). Zizhi Tongjian (資治通鑑) [Comprehensive Mirror for Aid in Government]. vols. 276, 279, 281, 283, 289.
