= Empress Zhong =

- Empress Guangmu of (Southern) Tang

Empress dowager of Southern Tang
- Tenure: 961–965
- Regent: Li Yu, son

Empress consort of Southern Tang
- Tenure: 943–961
- Predecessor: Empress Song, mother-in-law
- Successor: Zhou Ehuang, daughter-in-law
- Died: September or October 965 modern Nanjing, Jiangsu
- Burial: late 965 or January 966; Shun Mausoleum (順陵), in modern Jiangning District, Nanjing, Jiangsu 31°52′48.7″N 118°44′40.3″E
- Spouse: Li Jing (Emperor Yuanzong)
- Issue: Li Hongji, son; Li Yu, son; Li Congshan, son; Li Congqian (李從謙), son
Names
- Surname: Zhōng (鍾); Given name: unknown
Posthumous name
- Empress Guāngmù (光穆皇后)
- Father: Zhong Taizhang (鍾泰章)

Empress Zhong (鍾氏; given name unknown) (died 965), posthumously named Empress Guangmu (光穆皇后), was an empress consort and empress dowager of imperial China's short-lived Southern Tang Dynasty during the Five Dynasties and Ten Kingdoms period. She was married to Li Jing (né Xu Jingtong, Emperor Yuanzong), the second ruler of Southern Tang and gave birth to Li Yu, the third ruler.

== During Wu ==
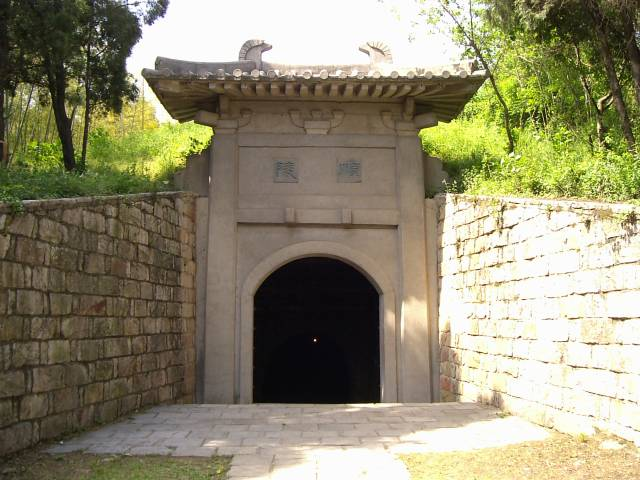
Entrance to Shun Mausoleum (順陵) in Jiangning District, Nanjing, Jiangsu, where Empress Zhong was buried along with her husband.

It is not known when Lady Zhong was born, but it was known that she was the second daughter of Zhong Taizhang (鍾泰章), who was a general of Southern Tang's predecessor state Wu (also known as Hongnong or Huainan). Zhong Taizhang had been instrument in the coming to power of Xu Wen (Lady Zhong's eventual grandfather-in-law) — as Xu and a colleague, Zhang Hao, had assassinated Wu's then-prince Yang Wo in 907, but then began to have a power struggle. Xu and another official, Yan Keqiu, then invited Zhong to lead a group of soldiers to ambush Zhang. Zhong agreed and was able to kill Zhang, allowing Xu to take over the reins of the state as the regent for Yang Wo's brother and successor Yang Longyan. However, it was said that Zhong was not well-rewarded for his actions, and, while he was quiet about his resentment, was resentful. Nevertheless, when Zhong was accused of improprieties in 923, Xu Wen was reluctant to, as his adoptive son, the junior regent Xu Zhigao suggested, punish Zhong, noting to Xu Zhigao his belief that had not for Zhong, he himself would have died at Zhang's hands. Rather, he ordered Xu Zhigao to take a daughter of Zhong's to be the wife of Xu Zhigao's son Xu Jingtong, leading to the marriage. It was said that when Xu Wen first saw Lady Zhong, he commented, "Only this boy is fit for this girl." During Wu (i.e., during the successive regencies of Xu Wen and Xu Zhigao, although the timing was not clear), Lady Zhong first received successive greater lady titles. She bore Xu Jingtong his first son Xu Hongji, and (later, during Southern Tang) would bear him his sixth son Xu Congjia and ninth son Li Congqian (李從謙). (His seventh son Li Congshan (李從善) was said to be her son in Li Congshan's biography in the Spring and Autumn Annals of the Ten Kingdoms, but said to be the son of his concubine Lady Ling in Lady Ling's biography.)

== During Southern Tang ==
In 937, Xu Zhigao had the Wu emperor, Yang Pu, yield the throne to him, ending Wu and starting a new state of Southern Tang. He created Xu Jingtong (who shortly after was renamed Xu Jing) the Prince of Wu, and then the Prince of Qi. Lady Zhong, as the wife of the Prince of Qi, received the title of Princess of Qi. (Xu Zhigao and Xu Jing, along with the rest of the imperial family (and therefore, including Empress Zhong's children) changed their family names from Xu to Xu Zhigao's birth name of Li in 939, with Xu Zhigao taking on the new name of Li Bian.)

In 943, Li Bian died and was succeeded by Li Jing. Li Jing created Princess Zhong empress. It was said that Empress Zhong, although she grew up in an honored household, did not favor entertainment, and did not wear luxurious clothing. Whenever the emperor rewarded her, she would first distribute the rewards to his concubines, and then to the other palace personnel. During the war that Southern Tang's rival Later Zhou waged against Southern Tang late in Li Jing's reign (955-958) that eventually led to Southern Tang's yielding to Later Zhou as a vassal state, Empress Zhong reduced the amount of meals served in her palace, and forbid the playing of music for months.

Li Jing died in 961, and Li Congjia, who was the crown prince at that point (his older brothers, including Li Hongji, had predeceased him), succeeded to the throne (and changed his name to Li Yu). He was set to honor Empress Zhong as empress dowager — traditionally, Huang Taihou (皇太后). However, as Empress Zhong's father's name was Zhong Taizhang, that title was deemed inappropriate due to naming taboo. Rather, she was honored with the title of Sheng Zunhou (聖尊后). When she subsequently became ill, Li Yu attended to her day and night. She died in 965.

== Notes and references ==
=== Sources ===
- (in Chinese) Wu Renchen (1669). Shiguo Chunqiu (十國春秋) [Spring and Autumn Annals of the Ten Kingdoms].
- Zizhi Tongjian, vols. 272, 283.
- Xu Zizhi Tongjian, vol. 2.

Regnal titles
| Preceded by Empress Zhang of Min | Empress of China (Northeastern Fujian); 945–946; With: Empress Feng of Later Jin | Succeeded by Empress Feng of Later Jin |
| Preceded by Empress Zhang of Min | Empress of China (Southern Fujian); 945–961 | Succeeded by Empress Zhou Ehuang |
| Preceded by Empress Zhang of Min | Empress of China (Northwestern Fujian); 945–961 | Succeeded by Empress Zhou Ehuang |
| Preceded by Empress Song | Empress of Southern Tang; 943–961 | Succeeded by Empress Zhou Ehuang |
| Preceded by Empress Song | Empress of China (Jiangxi/Southern Jiangsu/Southern Anhui); 943–961 | Succeeded by Empress Zhou Ehuang |
| Preceded by Empress Song | Empress of China (Central Jiangsu/Central Anhui/Eastern Hubei); 943–958 | Succeeded by Empress Dowager Fu (Later Zhou) of Later Zhou |
| Preceded by Empress Li of Later Han | Empress of China (Northwestern Hunan); 950–951 | Succeeded by Empress Fu the Elder of Later Zhou |
| Preceded by Empress Li of Later Han | Empress of China (Southeastern Hunan); 950–952 | Succeeded by Empress Fu the Elder of Later Zhou |
| Preceded by Empress Li of Later Han | Empress of China (Northeastern Guangxi); 950–951 | Succeeded by Empress Song of Song |
