= The Night Revels of Han Xizai =

Painting by Gu Hongzhong and remake

- 韓熙載夜宴圖/韩熙载夜宴图 (Chinese)
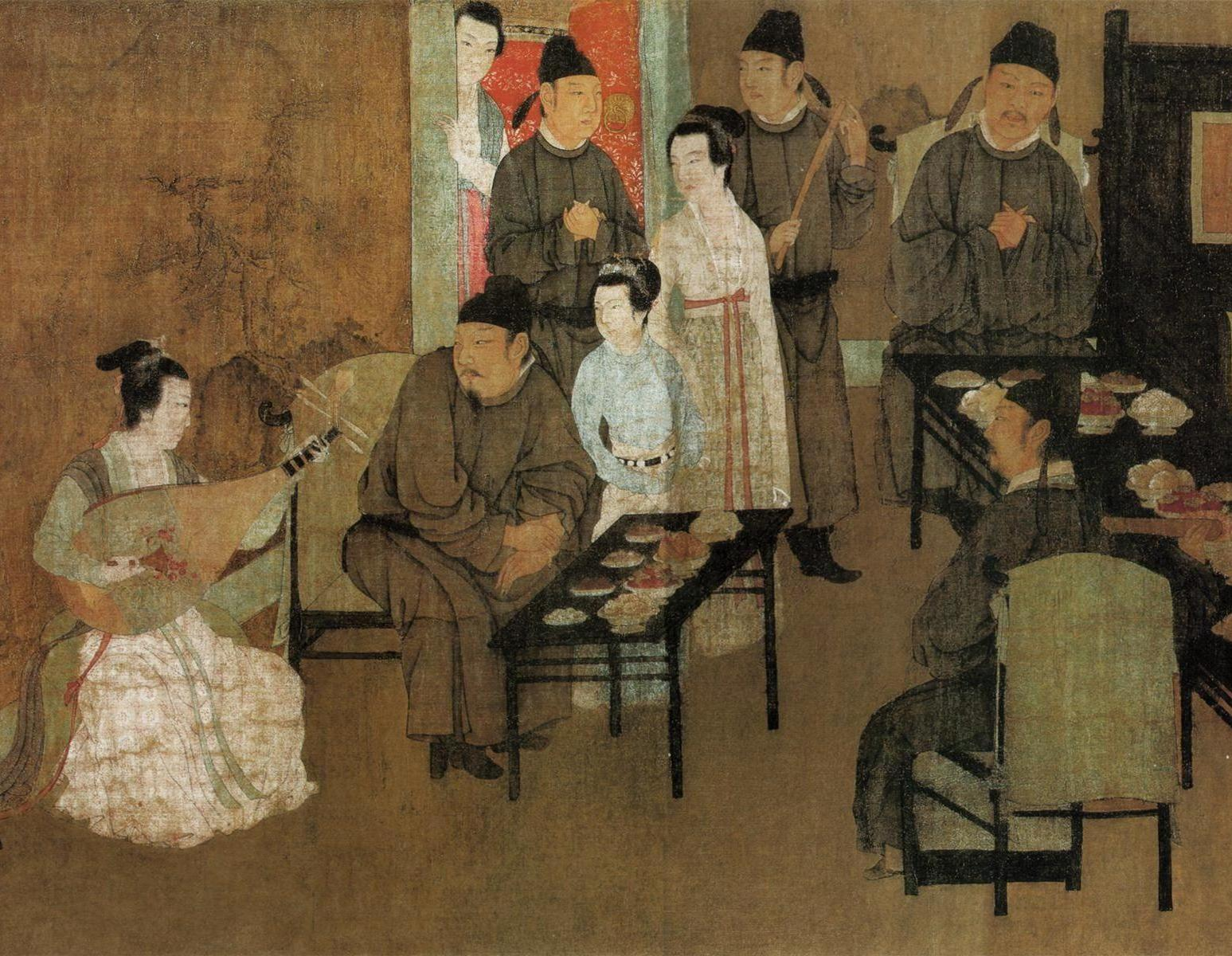
- A section of the scroll (12th century remake)
- Artist: Gu Hongzhong
- Year: 10th-century (original); 12th-century (remake)
- Catalogue: formerly The Precious Collection of the Stone Moat (Chinese: 石渠寶笈)
- Type: Handscroll
- Medium: Ink and color on silk
- Dimensions: 28.7 cm × 335.5 cm (11.3 in × 132.1 in)
- Location: Palace Museum, Beijing (12th-century copy)

The Night Revels of Han Xizai or The Night Entertainments of Han Xizai (traditional Chinese: 韓熙載夜宴圖; simplified Chinese: 韩熙载夜宴图; pinyin: Hán Xīzaì Yèyàn Tú) is a painted handscroll attributed to Chinese 10th-century artist Gu Hongzhong. The painting depicts Han Xizai, a minister from Southern Tang under the imperial government of emperor Li Yu, accompanied with realistic portrayals of more than forty people. Two copies of the artwork survived: a reproduction from the Song Dynasty, currently housed in the Palace Museum at Beijing; and a replica from the Ming Dynasty, under the collection of the Three Gorges Museum at Chongqing. The painting is highly regarded as one of the greatest masterpieces of Chinese art.

== Creation ==
Gu Hongzhong was reportedly sent to spy on Han Xizai. In one version of the story, Han Xizai repeatedly missed morning audiences with Li Yu because of his revelry and needed to be shamed into dignified behavior. In another version, Han Xizai refused Li Yu's offer to become prime minister. To check Han's suitability and find out what he was doing at home, Li Yu sent Gu Hongzhong alongside another court painter, Zhou Wenju, to one of Han's night parties and depict what they saw. Each of two painters created a painting based on their observation after a night of partying. Unlike Gu's painting, the one made by Zhou was subsequently lost.

== Composition ==
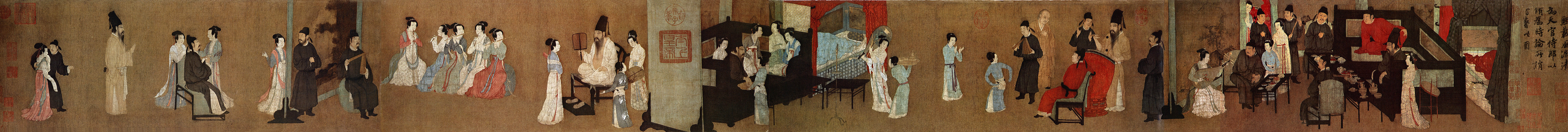
Full scroll of The Night Revels of Han Xizai, 12th-century reproduction

The painting is divided into five distinct parts and contains a seal of Shi Miyuan, a Song dynasty official. Viewed from right to left, the parts show Han Xizai listening to a pipa, striking a drum for dancers, resting, watching five female musicians playing flutes, and seeing off his guests. While in the early Tang period, musicians played sitting on floor mats, the painting shows them sitting on chairs, demonstrating the change that had occurred. Gu purposely created a somber ambiance, with none of the depicted persons smiling. The painting helped Li Yu dispel some of his distrust in Han, but did little to prevent the decline of Li's dynasty.

"The first of the five scenes that make up the painting shows the enjoyment of music. With high hat and full beard, Han Xizai is sitting on a couch with red-robed Lang Can, a scholar who ranked first in the highest imperial examination. They are listening attentively to a pipa lute (a stringed musical instrument) played by the sister of Li Jiaming, assistant director of the Imperial Theatre and Music Academy, who sits watchfully by her side. The girl in light blue is Wang Wushan, a talented dancer serving Han Xizai. The man standing behind her is Han's student Shu Ya. Seated near the table are two guests, Chen Zhiyong, an official in charge of rites, and his student Zhu Xian.

In the second scene, Wang Wushan is dancing to the beats of a drum that Han Xizai is striking. Everybody is focusing on her movements except Han's friend the monk Deming, who crosses his hands in front of his chest and bows his head. Although embarrassed, he cannot help but listen to the beats. In the third scene, surrounded by four female companions, Han is resting on a couch washing his hands in a basin. The fourth scene depicts the five females playing flutes. Han Xizai sits in a chair, cross-legged with his robe unbuttoned. In the fifth scene, Han holds two drumsticks in his right hand and waves goodbye to his guests with his left hand. A male guest is whispering to a maid behind Han. The five discrete scenes are artfully linked by screens.

There remains an inscription about Han Xizai, twenty words in length, at the beginning of the scroll by a collector of the Southern Song. The Ming calligrapher Cheng Nanyun (active early fifteenth century) wrote a three-word title "Night Revelry" (Yeyan tu). At the end of the scroll a label in running script reads A Brief Biography of Han Xizai (Han Xizai xiaozhuan) with several authentication seals. The Qing Qianlong Emperor (r. 1736-1795) also inscribed a colophon after the painting. The painting was included in The Precious Collection of the Stone Moat: the First Edition (Shiqu baoji), a catalogue of the Qianlong Emperor's calligraphy and painting collection."
