= Han Xizai =

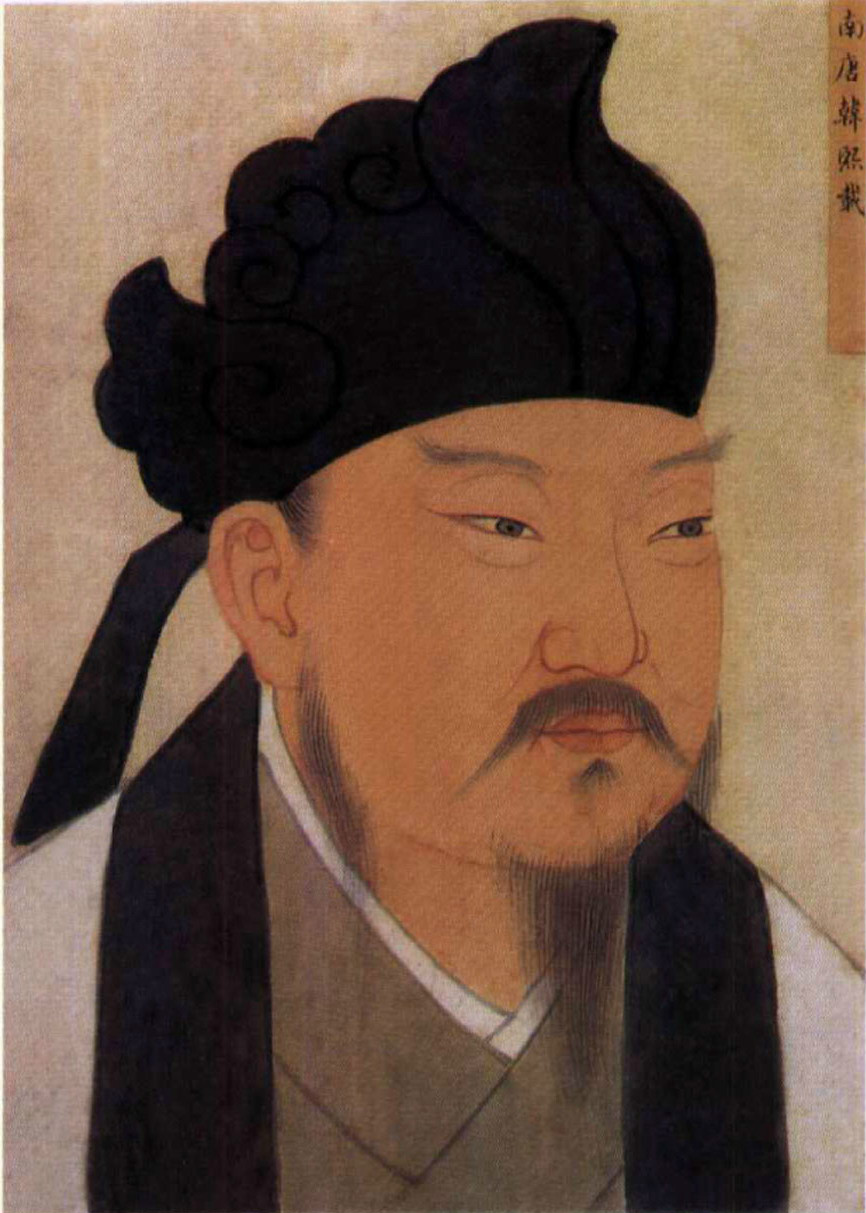
Han Xizai

Han Xizai (Chinese: 韓熙載) (902 – August 31, 970), courtesy name Shuyan (叔言), was an official of the Yang Wu and Southern Tang dynasties during the Five Dynasties and Ten Kingdoms period of China, known for his skill in writing and calligraphy.

== Background ==
Han Xizai was born in 902, late in the Tang dynasty. He was said to be from Beihai (北海, in modern Weifang, Shandong) (and, based on subsequent events, appeared to have been born there). In his youth, he lived as a hermit on Mount Song. Later, during the Tongguang era (923-926) of the reign of Li Cunxu (Emperor Zhuangzong), the founding emperor of the succeeding Later Tang dynasty, he passed the imperial examinations in the Jinshi class.

During the early Later Tang, Han Xizai's father Han Shusi (韓叔嗣) served as an assistant to military governor (Jiedushi) of Pinglu Circuit (平盧, headquartered in modern Weifang), Fu Xi (符習). In 926, when many mutinies rose against Li Cunxu's rule and one of the most major was centered at Yedu (鄴都, in modern Handan, Hebei), Fu led his troops toward Yedu, preparing to combat the Yedu mutineers under the overall command of the major general Li Siyuan, an adoptive brother of Li Cunxu's. However, on the way, news arrived at Fu's camp that Li Siyuan's own army had forced him into joining the mutiny, so he tried to retreat back to Pinglu's capital Qing Prefecture (青州). When he reached Zi Prefecture (淄州, in modern Zibo, Shandong), however, the eunuch monitor of the Pinglu army, Yang Xiwang (楊希望), whom he had left in charge of the circuit in his absence, turned against him and tried to resist him from returning, so he took the army and fled west. The commander of the army left at Qing, Wang Gongyan (王公儼), then killed Yang and took over the city. Han Shusi was said to be a participant in Wang's plans.

Meanwhile, Li Cunxu was killed in another mutiny at then-capital Luoyang itself. Li Siyuan then arrived at Luoyang and claimed imperial title. Wang, wanting to be made military governor, claimed that Fu was harsh to his army such that the army did not want his return. When Fu nevertheless approached Qing and got to Qi Prefecture (齊州, in modern Jinan, Shandong), Wang resisted him, and Fu did not dare to approach further. Li Siyuan, however, was unwilling to allow Wang to retain Pinglu, and instead named Wang the prefect of Deng Prefecture (登州, in modern Yantai, Shandong). Wang initially refused to report to Deng, but when Li Siyuan then made the general Huo Yanwei the military governor of Pinglu and had Huo gather up a force to prepare an operation against Wang, Wang became fearful and left Qing, heading for Deng. Huo intercepted him and executed him and his associates, including Han Shusi.

In the aftermaths of his father Han Shusi's death, Han Xizai became fearful that he would also be killed, so planned to flee to Later Tang's southeastern neighbor Wu. His friend and fellow Jinshi, Li Gu (who would later be a chancellor of the succeeding Later Zhou), knew of his plan, and accompanied him to the two states' border post Zhengyang (正陽, on the border of modern Fuyang and Lu'an, Anhui), on the Huai River, to send him off. They drank together before parting with each other. At that time, Han made the comment, "If Wu makes me a chancellor, I will surely invade and conquer the Central Plains." Li laughed and responded, "If the Central Plains makes me a chancellor, for me to take Wu would be as easy as taking something out of a sack." Han then entered Wu realm.

== During Yang Wu ==
Upon his arrival at the Yang Wu court, Han Xizai submitted a petition in which he, describing his qualifications, used grand language that described himself as being learned in the Spring and Autumn Annals, military strategy from the Six Secret Teachings, having the capability of the Han dynasty strategist Chen Ping and the Warring States period debater Lu Zhonglian (魯仲連), and implicitly comparing himself to Fan Zeng and Jiang Ziya. At that time, dominant at the Wu court was the regent Xu Zhigao, who wanted to curb the officials in their behavior, but Han was young and carefree, which did not fit into Xu's ideals. Han therefore did not receive a high position — he was initially made Xiaoshulang (校書郎), a copyeditor at the Palace Library, and later three terms as assistant to the prefects of Chu (滁州, in modern Chuzhou, Anhui), He (和州, in modern Ma'anshan, Anhui), and Chang (常州, in modern Changzhou, Jiangsu) Prefectures. This was despite the fact that at that time, Xu, wanting to entice capable people from the Central Plains, often promoted them quickly, but it was said that Han was not concerned about his being bypassed for promotions.

== During Southern Tang ==
=== During Li Bian's reign ===
In 937, Xu Zhigao had Wu's last emperor Yang Pu yield the throne to him, ending Wu and starting a new state of Southern Tang with him as its emperor. (He shortly after changed his name to Li Bian, restoring his birth family name (as he was an adopted son of the previous regent, Xu Wen).) He recalled Han Xizai from his prefectural assignment and gave Han the office of Mishu Lang (秘書郎), but put Han on the staff of his son Li Jing the Prince of Qi, who was the apparent heir to the throne. He stated to Han:

Because you, sir, had long had a well-known reputation but had not had much experience, I labored you with various duties in the prefectures and the counties. You should favor what is good, correct your ways, and serve my son.

Han, however, did not thank him. During the time of Han's service on Li Jing's staff, further, Han was said to be only talking humorously and not involving himself with the prince's governance.

=== During Li Jing's reign ===
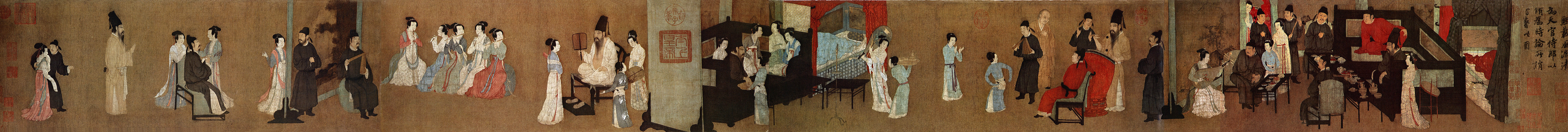
The Night Revels of Han Xizai (韓熙載夜宴圖) by the Southern Tang painter Gu Hongzhong, Palace Museum, Beijing, China.

Li Bian died in 943, and Li Jing became Southern Tang's emperor. He therefore immediately changed the era name (from his father's Shengyuan era to his own Baoda era). Han Xizai submitted a petition urging against doing so until the following calendar year, but Li Jing did not listen to him. Li Jing, however, did promote him to be Yubu Yunwailang (虞部員外郎), an official at the ministry of public works (工部, Gongbu), as well as an editor of the imperial history. Thankful for the promotion, he commented that it must have been that Li Bian understood his talent but wanted to wait to let Li Jing promote him, as the Eastern Wei regent Gao Huan did with his general Murong Shaozong (whom he did not promote with the purpose of having his son Gao Cheng do so, so that Murong would be grateful to Gao Cheng). He thus offered many suggestions about governance, as well as various ceremonies, to Li Jing, not holding back. He therefore drew the suspicion of the senior chancellor Song Qiqiu and Song's associate Feng Yanji. It was Han who proposed, as Li Bian's funeral was being planned, that Li Bian's temple name be Liezu (using zu to signify a founder, even though Li Bian had ostensibly been claiming to be inheriting the Tang throne, as Han pointed that out that despite that ostensible connection, it was Li Bian who "restored" Tang rule which no longer existed by at point), a suggestion for which Li Jing was appreciative of, and he put Han in charge of drafting edicts. It was said that edicts that Han drafted were elegant, with style similar to those of the Yuanhe era of Emperor Xianzong of Tang.

In 946, Later Tang's successor dynasty Later Jin was destroyed by the Khitan Liao Dynasty to the north. Han suggested to Li Jing that this was the opportune time to use the Khitan's unfamiliar with Chinese territory to attack north and "recover" Tang territory. However, at that time, Southern Tang's own main forces were stuck in a confrontation with Wuyue to the southeast, after having destroyed Min but not having been able to immediately seize all of Min territory, such that Li Jing could not open a second front to the north, a fact that caused him to regret the entire Min venture. After Song's associates Chen Jue and Feng Yanlu (Feng Yanji's brother) eventually were badly defeated by Wuyue forces during the Min campaign, causing Wuyue to be able to seize the former Min capital Fu Prefecture (福州, in modern Fuzhou, Fujian), Han proposed that they be executed, but Li Jing rejected the proposal, only exiling them. Han also continued to criticize Song's party, arguing that they would eventually bring disaster to the state. Song, in turn, accused Han of being wild and drunk, and had him demoted to be the personnel officer at He Prefecture. He was later promoted to be an assistant to the military governor of Ningguo Circuit (寧國, headquartered in modern Xuancheng, Anhui), and later restored his positions at Yubu Yuanwailang and editor of history. Shortly after, he was further promoted to be Zhongshu Sheren (中書舍人), a mid-level official at the legislative bureau of government (中書省, Zhongshu Sheng). He thereafter proposed minting money using iron, rather than the traditional copper. Li Jing agreed, and thereafter made him the deputy minister of census (戶部侍郎, Hubu Shilang) as well as the director of the mint (鑄錢使).

In 952, there was a rebellion by Later Zhou's general Murong Yanchao (a half-brother of Liu Zhiyuan, the founder of the predecessor Later Han, which succeeded Later Jin). Li Jing tried to aid Murong, but the Southern Tang army was repelled by Later Zhou, and Murong eventually was defeated, and then committed suicide. When subsequently there were still many proposals by others to attack Later Zhou, Han pointed out that Later Zhou's founding emperor Guo Wei was, by that point, firmly in control of his realm and that any attacks would be of dubious chance of success. Despite what Han pointed out, Southern Tang continued to frequently aid various rebellions against Later Zhou rule, causing irritation against Southern Tang at the Later Zhou court, such that, by the time of the reign of Guo's nephew and adoptive son Guo Rong (also known as Chai Rong), it did eventually launch a major attack against Southern Tang (which, incidentally, Han's old friend Li Gu initially commanded as a chancellor of Later Zhou, although Li Gu eventually had to resign before the end of the campaign due to illness) that greatly weakened Southern Tang by stripping it of its territory north of the Yangtze River. The only extent advice to Li Jing during the campaign from Han was in 956, when Li Jing put his brother Li Jingda (李景達) the Prince of Qi in charge of the operations resisting Later Zhou, but also made Chen (who had been restored to grace by that point) Li Jingda's army monitor. Han pointed out that there was no one more trustworthy than Li Jingda already, and that an army monitor was unnecessary, but Li Jing did not listen.

The war between Later Zhou and Southern Tang eventually resulted in Southern Tang capitulation after heavy losses — with Southern Tang agreeing to submit as a vassal and cede all remaining territory north of the Yangtze River to Later Zhou. There were subsequent frequent exchanges of emissaries between Later Zhou and Southern Tang. On at least one occasion, Han served as Southern Tang's emissary to Later Zhou, at which time he had the chance to meet the Later Zhou general Zhao Kuangyin. Upon his return, Li Jing asked him about his impressions of the various Later Zhou generals. Han responded, "Overseer Zhao has an unusual appearance. It was difficult to judge him." When, after Guo Rong's death in 959, Zhao seized the throne from Guo Rong's son and successor Guo Zongsun in 960, establishing Song Dynasty as its Emperor Taizu, the people who heard Han's assessment were thus impressed.

=== During Li Yu's reign ===
Li Jing died in 961 and was succeeded by his son Li Yu. Shortly after, Han Xizai and another official, Qu Lin (曲霖), served as Li Yu's emissary to Song to attend to the state funeral of the Song emperor's mother Empress Dowager Du, who had also recently died.

Meanwhile, while Li Jing had apparently approved of Han's proposal to mint money using iron and copper, the proposal was apparently never carried out due to the strenuous objection of the chancellor Yan Xu, who believed that minting with iron was ill-advised.On one occasion, apparently after Li Yu's ascension, Han and Yan argued in front of the emperor on the matter, and Han's vehement argument apparently offended the emperor and/or Yan, causing him to be demoted to be Mishu Jian (祕書監, the head of the archival bureau). By 964, however, Han had apparently been restored to be deputy minister of civil service affairs (吏部侍郎, Libu Shilang) and again put in charge of minting, with the intent that his iron-minting proposal be carried out. Upon the implementation, Li Yu awarded him with 2,000,000 of the new coins, and made him the minister of defense (兵部尚書, Bingbu Shangshu), as well as imperial scholar at Qinzheng Hall (勤政殿). However, it was said that the people lacked faith in the iron money, and secretly continued to hold on to copper money to preserve their wealth. When merchants travelled out of Southern Tang realm, they were exchanging 10 iron coins for one copper coin, and this could not be easily prohibited; as a result, prices for goods became greatly inflated. As a result, the Southern Tang government was forced to effectively legitimize this practice, using the iron money to only complement, not replace, the copper money. Han became regretful of his proposal.

At Li Yu's court, Han developed a reputation for being talented, capable of speaking, and leading in fashion trend with his clothing.It was said that his hats, in particular, became famous, such that people from other states came from afar, seeking the hats and willing to pay large amounts of money for them. It was said that in his behavior, he did not pay attention to details, but was respectful to elders. He maintained 40 courtesans in his household, and did not guard their conduct, such that his male guests could come and go, associating with the courtesans freely, causing much murmur about the propriety of his household. When someone who was close to him asked him about this, he told that person, "I am doing this to dirty myself to avoid becoming chancellor. I am old, and I cannot become the laughing stock of history." At one point, Han was accused of not attending imperial meetings under false excuses, and was demoted to the purely honorary post of Taizi You Shuzi (太子右庶子) and sent out to the southern capital Nanchang. After receiving the demotion, Han dismissed his courtesans, pleasing Li Yu, who then kept him at the capital Jinling as Mishu Jian, and later then restored him as the minister of defense, planning to give him greater responsibilities. However, upon being restored to that post, Han summoned the courtesans back to his household, causing Li Yu to be exasperated at not knowing what to do with him and ultimately not making him chancellor. At one point, he offered five volumes of epigrams to Li Yu, who wrote him and thanked him, and then made him Zhongshu Shilang (中書侍郎, the deputy head of the legislative bureau) as well as chief imperial scholar at Guangzheng Hall (光政殿學士承旨).

In 968, after Han submitted a number of policy suggestions in the area of criminal law, Li Yu wrote back thanking him for the suggestions, and subsequently made him the military governor of Baisheng Circuit (百勝, headquartered in modern Ganzhou, Jiangxi) and gave him the honorary chancellor title of Zhongshu Ling (中書令). (However, based on subsequent events, it appeared that he did not actually report to Baisheng.) Later that year, Li Yu married the sister of his late wife and empress Zhou Ehuang as the new empress — an act that drew disapproval from his officials because he had, while the first empress was ill, carried on an affair with the new empress before actually marrying her or taking her as a consort. As a result, at the imperial feast celebrating the wedding, Han and a number of other officials presented poems that outwardly celebrated the marriage but were satirizing it. Li Yu did not punish them.

In 969, there was a time that Li Yu, after a hunt, visited the supreme court (大理寺, Dali Si) and personally interrogated defendants, freeing many of them. Han did not consider this appropriate, and submitted a petition that stated, "Criminal matters are the responsibility of appropriate agencies. Jails are no place for the emperor's wagon to go. I would like to request that the appropriate agencies penalize the palace 3,000,000 coins to be used for military supplies."

In 970, Han fell ill, and in his illness, submitted a final petition to Li Yu, stating, "I do not have contributions even as great as trampling grass, but have faults that rose even to the heavens. My old wife lies on the bed, moaning, and my young sons sit around the bed, crying." He died shortly after. Li Yu was greatly saddened, and posthumously gave him the designation of chancellor and the posthumous name Wenjing (文靖), matching that of the great Jin Dynasty prime minister Xie An and buried him near Xie's tomb.

== Notes and references ==
- Spring and Autumn Annals of the Ten Kingdoms, vol. 28.
- Zizhi Tongjian, vols. 275, 283, 286, 290, 293, 294.
- Xu Zizhi Tongjian, vols. 1, 2, 3, 5, 6.
- Kurz, Johannes L. (2011). "Han Xizai (902–970): An Eccentric Life in Exciting Times". In Lorge, Peter (ed.). Five Dynasties and Ten Kingdoms. The Chinese University Press. pp. 79–99. ISBN 978-962-996-418-4.
