= Gu Hongzhong =

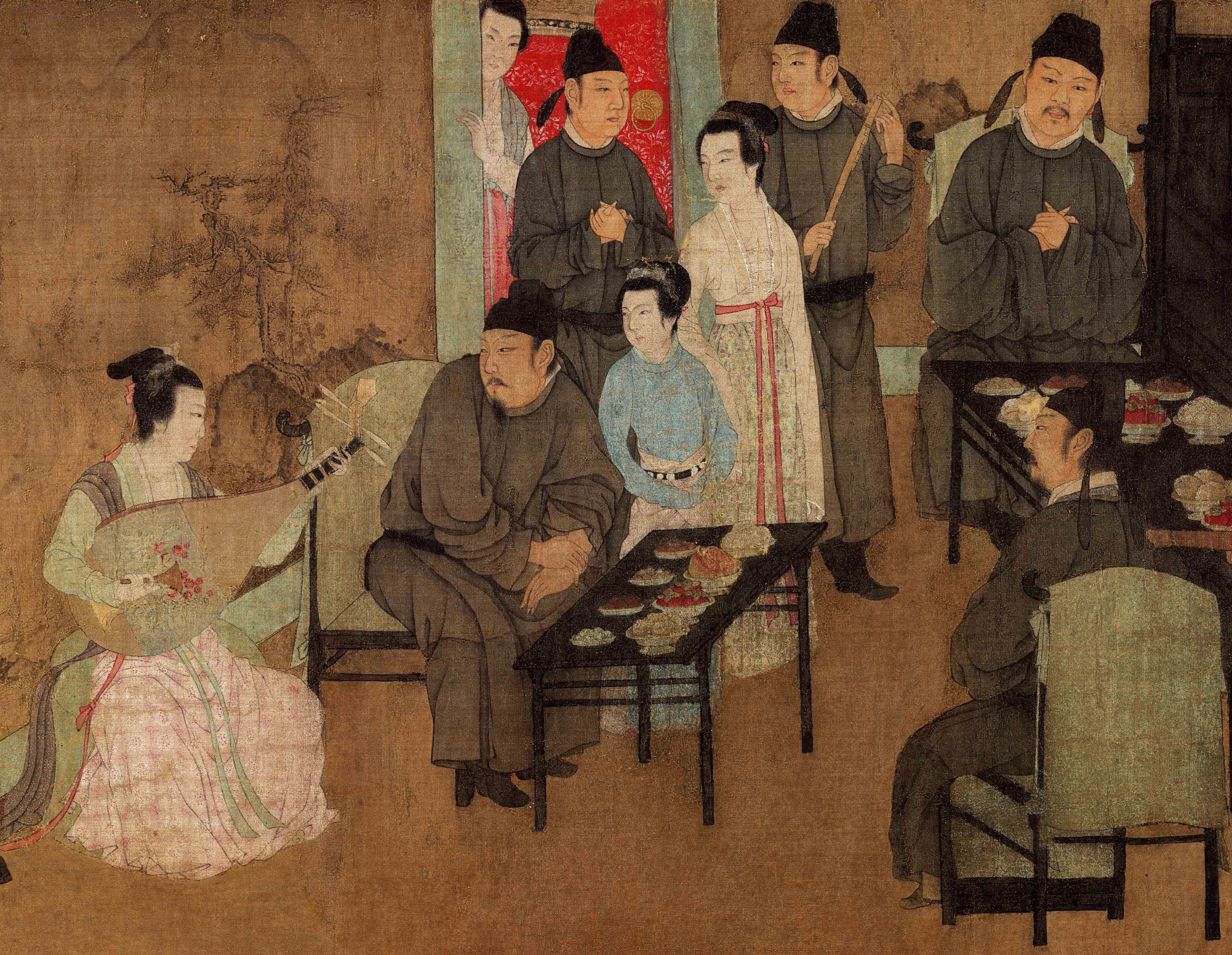
- Detail of Night Revels of Han Xizai
- Born: (Chinese: 顧閎中; pinyin: Gù Hóngzhōng; 937
- Died: 975
- Known for: Painting
- Movement: Five Dynasties and Ten Kingdoms

Gu Hongzhong (simplified Chinese: 顾闳中; traditional Chinese: 顧閎中; pinyin: Gù Hóngzhōng; 937–975) was a Chinese painter during the Five Dynasties and Ten Kingdoms period of Chinese history.

Gu was active until 960 CE and was most likely a court painter of the Southern Tang dynasty during the reign of Li Yu. His most well-known work is the Night Revels of Han Xizai. Gu's original no longer exists, but the painting survives as a 12th-century remake during the subsequent Song dynasty. The painting is housed in the Palace Museum in Beijing.

== Night Revels of Han Xizai ==
The Night Revels of Han Xizai is a painted scroll depicting Han Xizai, a minister of Li Yu. This narrative painting is split into five distinct sections: Han Xizai listens to the pipa, watches dancers, takes a rest, plays string instruments, and then sees guests off.

Gu Hongzhong was supposedly sent to pry on Han Xizai's private life per emperor Li Yu's request. One theory is that Li Yu wanted to know why Han refused his offer to make him the prime minister. Another is that Han Xizai repeatedly missed early-morning audiences with the emperor because of his revelry, fondness of drinking and banquets with friends, and needed to be shamed into dignified behavior.

The work was not only a painting about personal life, but also represented many features from that period. Using careful observation, all of the details of the Night Revels were thoroughly exposed and peoples' expressions were vivid and true-to-life. In the picture, there are more than 40 figures—all lifelike and with different expressions. The painting represented the lifestyle of the ruling class of that time indirectly. The painter's surprising observation of Han Xizai makes the painting thought-provoking.

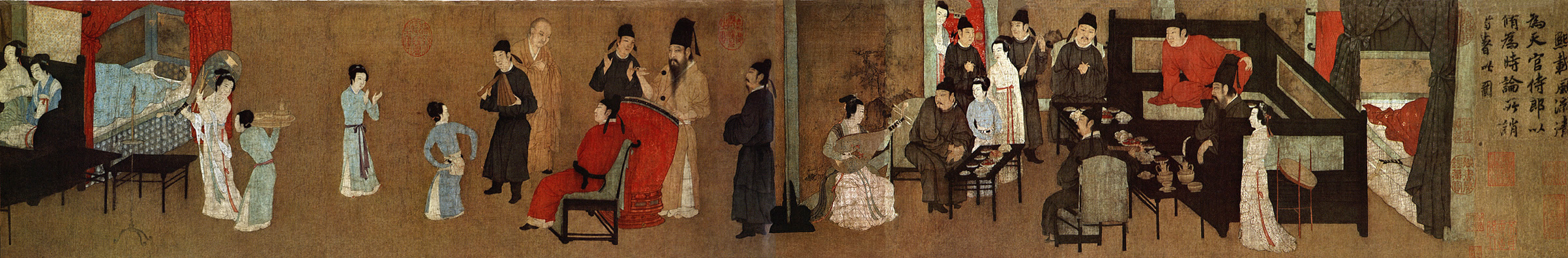
First half section of the Night Revels of Han Xizai, 12th century remake, view from right to left
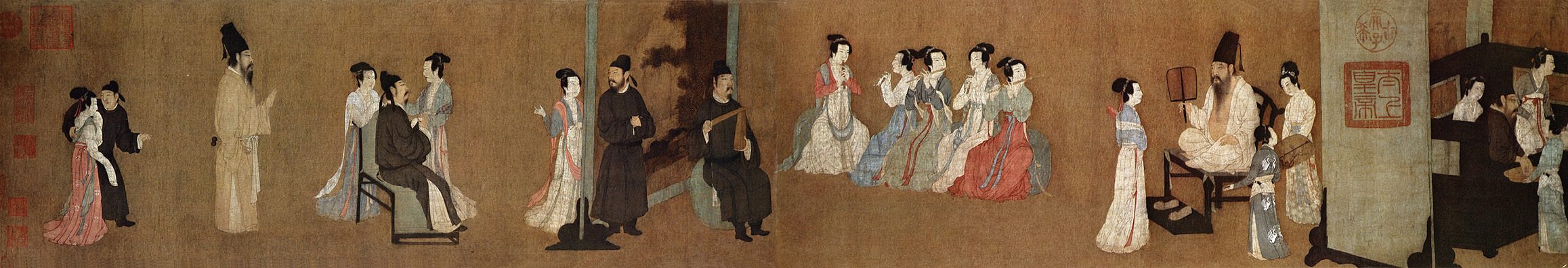
Second half section of the Night Revels of Han Xizai, 12th century remake

=== Art inspired by Night Revels of Han Xizai ===
In 2000, artist Wang Qingsong created The Night Revels of Lao Li based on The Night Revels of Han Xizai. Instead of a painting like the original, it is a photograph. The artwork uses contemporary costume and references to comment on current Chinese culture.

== See also ==
- List of Chinese painters
- Chinese Painting
- Night in paintings (Eastern art)
