= Yan Xu =

Yan Xu (嚴續) (910–967), courtesy name Xingzong (興宗), was an official of the Chinese Five Dynasties and Ten Kingdoms Period states Wu and Southern Tang, serving as a chancellor during the reigns of Southern Tang's last two emperors, Li Jing and Li Yu.

== Background ==
Yan Xu was born in 910, during the reign of Yang Longyan the Prince of Wu. His father Yan Keqiu was a prominent politician serving under Wu's regent Xu Wen. In or around 918, when Xu Wen was faced with the issue of whether to have his older, but adoptive, son Xu Zhigao continue to serve as the junior regent under him, or displace Xu Zhigao with a younger biological son, Xu Zhixún, Yan Keqiu was advocating for Xu Zhixún. Xu Zhigao tried to expel Yan out of the Wu central government to serve as the prefect of Chu Prefecture (楚州, in modern Huai'an, Jiangsu), but Yan was able to persuade Xu Wen to let him remain. Xu Zhigao thereafter tried to make peace between himself and Yan Keqiu by agreeing to give a daughter in marriage to Yan Xu, although it was unclear whether the marriage occurred that year or not.

When Yan Xu was in his teenage years, Yan Keqiu was serving as a chancellor. As the chancellor's son, Yan Xu was made a guard officer for then-Wu emperor Yang Pu (Yang Longyan's brother and successor), and then later Mishu Lang (秘書郎, an assistant at the Palace Library). While Yan Xu's household was rich and honored in his youth, he was nevertheless humble and diligent. After Xu Zhigao seized the throne in 937, ending Wu and starting Southern Tang (and subsequently changing his name to Li Bian), Yan Xu was made the deputy minister of defense (兵部侍郎, Bingbu Shilang) and Shangshu Zuo Cheng (尚書左丞), one of the secretaries general at the executive bureau of government (尚書省, Shangshu Sheng).

== During Li Jing's reign ==
Li Bian died in 943 and was succeeded by his oldest son Li Jing. Subsequently, Yan Xu was made minister of rites (禮部尚書, Libu Shangshu), and then Zhongshu Shilang (中書侍郎, deputy head of the legislative bureau of government (中書省, Zhongshu Sheng). At that time, many of the politicians at the Southern Tang court were allies of the senior chancellor Song Qiqiu. Both Yan and the imperial scholar Chang Mengxi (常夢錫) were known for their independence and faithfulness. Li Jing once spoke to Chang, stating, "Among the key officials, only Yan Xu is fair and independent, but he lacks abilities. I am afraid he cannot overcome the partisans. You, sir, should help him." However, not long after, Chang was relieved of his duties of being in charge of the Xuanzheng Hall (宣政院), where he drafted edicts for Li Jing (albeit remaining as imperial scholar), and Yan was sent out of the imperial government to serve as the governor (觀察使, Guanchashi) of Chi Prefecture (池州, in modern Chizhou, Anhui), such that Chang became distressed and no longer involved himself in affairs of state.

Subsequently, the official Jiang Wenwei (江文蔚) publicly stated at an imperial gathering, "Yan Xu is a highly decorated relative of the emperor and is an important official. Now, because he does not join the party of the wicked, he gets expelled. Of course, we will know what will happen to the rest of us." As a result of this public declaration, Song's partisans felt compelled to have Yan recalled to the imperial government to again serve as Zhongshu Shilang and the director of the three financial agencies (taxation, treasury, and salt and iron monopolies). However, he was later again sent out of the imperial government to serve as the military governor of Fenghua Circuit (奉化, headquartered in Jiujiang, Jiangxi).

After Yan served for several years at Fenghua, he was again recalled to the imperial government to be Zhongshu Shilang and acting head of the executive bureau (尚書省, Shangshu Sheng). In 955, Li Jing made him chancellor and Menxia Shilang (門下侍郎, deputy head of the examination bureau (門下省, Menxia Sheng)). In 958, after Southern Tang was forced to cede territories north of the Yangtze River to its northern rival Later Zhou and submit as a vassal state to Later Zhou, Li Jing demoted the titles of most of his high-level officials to show humility to Later Zhou, and Yan was made Taizi Shaofu (太子少傅), an advisor to Li Jing's son, Li Hongji the Crown Prince. Shortly after this, Yan's political rival Chen Jue, after returning from a diplomatic mission to Later Zhou, falsely claimed that Later Zhou's emperor Guo Rong blamed Yan for resisting Later Zhou and ordered Li Jing to put him to death. Li Jing knew of the enmity between Chen and Yan and therefore did not believe the order. He had another official, Zhong Mo (鍾謨), go to the Later Zhou court to verify with Guo; Guo replied that, based on what Li Jing had informed him, Yan was a faithful Southern Tang subject, and he would surely not want Yan put to death. After Zhong reported back to Li Jing, Li Jing realized of the Song party's treachery. He thus had Chen put to death, and forced Song and another Song partisan, Li Zhenggu (李徵古), put to death.

In 960, the Later Zhou general Zhao Kuangyin overthrew Guo Rong's son and successor Guo Zongxun, establishing Song dynasty (as its Emperor Taizu), to which Southern Tang continued to be a vassal state. When Guo Rong's cousin Li Chongjin rose against the Song emperor at Yang Prefecture (揚州, in modern Yangzhou, Jiangsu), the Song emperor defeated him quickly, and he committed suicide. With the Song emperor just north of the Yangtze from the Southern Tang capital Jinling, Li Jing, in fear that the Song emperor had more designs than just to destroy Li Chongjin, sent Yan (and later his son Li Congyi (李從鎰) and the official Feng Yanlu) to pay tribute to the Song emperor, who subsequently, after demonstrating his troop strength, withdrew. Still, Li Jing decided to move the capital from Jinling to Nanchang, which he did in 961, leaving then-crown prince Li Congjia (as Li Hongji had died by that point) in charge at Jinling as regent, with Yan, then carrying the title of You Pushe (右僕射), serving as the acting chief of staff, assisted by Tang Yue (湯悅).

== During Li Yu's reign ==
Li Jing died later in 961, and after his casket was returned to Jinling for burial, Li Congjia took the throne, changed his name to Li Yu, and decided to keep the capital at Jinling rather than Nanchang. Li Yu gave Yan Xu the title of Sikong (司空, one of the Three Excellencies) and again made him chancellor. Not long after, there was a controversial proposal by the official Han Xizai, who advocated that iron be used for coins, as the supply of old Tang coins, made of copper, was being depleted, and Southern Tang's then territory lacked copper for new coins. Yan vehemently opposed Han's proposal, but Li Yu approved of Han's proposal — which led to high inflation, as the people, lacking trust in the new iron coins, continued to use copper coins and trading them at over 10 times the value of iron coins, much to Han's regret.

It was said that as chancellor to Li Yu, Yan was honest and loyal, but lacked knowledge, such that the people he entrusted with responsibilities lacked the proper abilities. Someone — possibly Jiang Wenwei — wrote a poem entitled Ode to a Crab to satirize Yan. Further, at that time, because there were many military matters, it ended up that main decisions were made at the office of the chief of staff (in charge of military matters), and Yan's words were not often listened to. Sometime in or prior to 965, at Yan's request, he was made the military governor of Zhenhai Circuit (鎮海, headquartered in modern Zhenjiang, Jiangsu). He was at Zhenhai for more than a year, when he, due to illness, requested to return to his mansion (probably at Jinling), and he died there, shortly after new year 967. He was given posthumous honors.

== Notes and references ==
- Spring and Autumn Annals of the Ten Kingdoms, vol. 23.
- Zizhi Tongjian, vols. 270, 285, 292, 294.
- Xu Zizhi Tongjian, vols. 1, 2, 3.
