= Jianzhou =

Jianzhou or Jian Prefecture is the name of a number of former prefectures in China. It may refer to:

== Written as 建州 ==
- Jianzhou (Fujian), in roughly modern Jian'ou, Fujian
  - Jian ware or Jianzhou ware, produced in Jianzhou
- Jianzhou of Balhae/Bohai, in modern Dongning, Heilongjiang
- Jianzhou Guard, home of the Jianzhou Jurchens
- Jianzhou, in roughly modern Jincheng, Shanxi
- Jianzhou, in roughly modern Yunan, Guangdong
- Jianzhou, in roughly modern Shangcheng County, Henan
- Jianzhou, in roughly modern Shaoyang, Hunan
- Jianzhou, in roughly modern Fuzhou, Fujian
- Jianzhou of Liao, in roughly modern Chaoyang County, Liaoning

== Written as 劍州 / 剑州 ==
- Jianzhou, in roughly modern Ngawa County, Sichuan
- Jianzhou, in roughly modern Jiange County, Sichuan
- Jianzhou or South Jianzhou, in roughly modern Nanping, Fujian

== Written as 簡州 / 简州 ==
- Jianzhou, in roughly modern Heng County, Guangxi
- Jianzhou, in roughly modern Jianyang, Sichuan
- Jianzhou, in roughly modern Danyang, Jiangsu

== See also ==
- Jian Zhou
