= Queen Zhou the Elder =

Zhou Ehuang
- Queen Zhaohui of (Southern) Tang

Queen consort of Southern Tang
- Tenure: 961–964
- Predecessor: Empress Zhong
- Successor: Queen Zhou the Younger
- Born: 936 or early 937 likely modern Yangzhou, Jiangsu
- Died: 8 December 964 modern Nanjing, Jiangsu
- Burial: 14 February 965; Yi Mausoleum (懿陵), suspected to be the site discovered in 2010 in modern Jiangning District, Nanjing, Jiangsu
- Spouse: Li Yu
- Issue Detail: Sons Li Zhongyu 李仲寓, 958-994, Li Zhongxuan 李仲宣, 961-964
Names
- Surname: Zhōu (周); Given name: Éhuáng (娥皇)
Posthumous name
- Queen Zhāohuì (昭惠國后)
- Father: Zhou Zong

Zhou Ehuang (周娥皇) (c. 936 – 8 December 964), posthumously named Queen Zhaohui (昭惠國后), was a queen consort of imperial China's short-lived Southern Tang state during the Five Dynasties and Ten Kingdoms period. Her husband was Li Yu, Southern Tang's third and last ruler.

She is best known as Queen Zhou the Elder (大周后) to distinguish from her younger sister Queen Zhou the Younger whom Li Yu married after her death. A musical genius and pipa virtuoso, she is suspected to be the subject of many of Li Yu's enduring love poems.

== Biography ==
Zhou Ehuang was the daughter of Zhou Zong, an official to Emperor Yuanzong. She had a younger sister named Zhou Jiamin, who was 14 years younger than her. She studied the book of history, mastered the rhythm of music, and played xiangqi. As a musical genius, she played the pipa for Emperor Li Jing on his birthday, and he rewarded her with a pipa as a present. He married her to his son, Li Yu Prince of Wu. After Li Jing died, Li Yu ascended to the throne as emperor and honored her as Queen. Her younger sister, then 5 at the time, was allowed to visit the palace frequently.

As queen, she gave birth to two sons, Li Chongyu and Li Chongxuan. Her younger son, Li Chongxuan, was playing in front of a statue when a lamp suddenly fell down on him. Li Chongxuan was frightened and eventually died of shock at the age of three. Queen Zhou was saddened, and she eventually fell ill. She lamented to her husband about their son, and Li Yu was greatly saddened too. During her last days, there is speculation but no evidence that Li Yu carried out an affair with her younger sister, who was 14 at that time. After Queen Zhou died, Li Yu wrote a poem for her. Soon, Queen Zhou's mother in law, Empress Dowager Zhong succumbed to illness. After their funerals, Queen Zhou's younger sister Jiamin became the new queen of Li Yu. Jiamin would be known in history as Queen Zhou the Younger and would accompany Li Yu until his death.

== Notes and references ==
=== Sources ===
- (in Chinese) Wu Renchen (1669). Shiguo Chunqiu (十國春秋) [Spring and Autumn Annals of the Ten Kingdoms].
