= Jianzhou (Fujian) =

Former prefecture of Imperial China

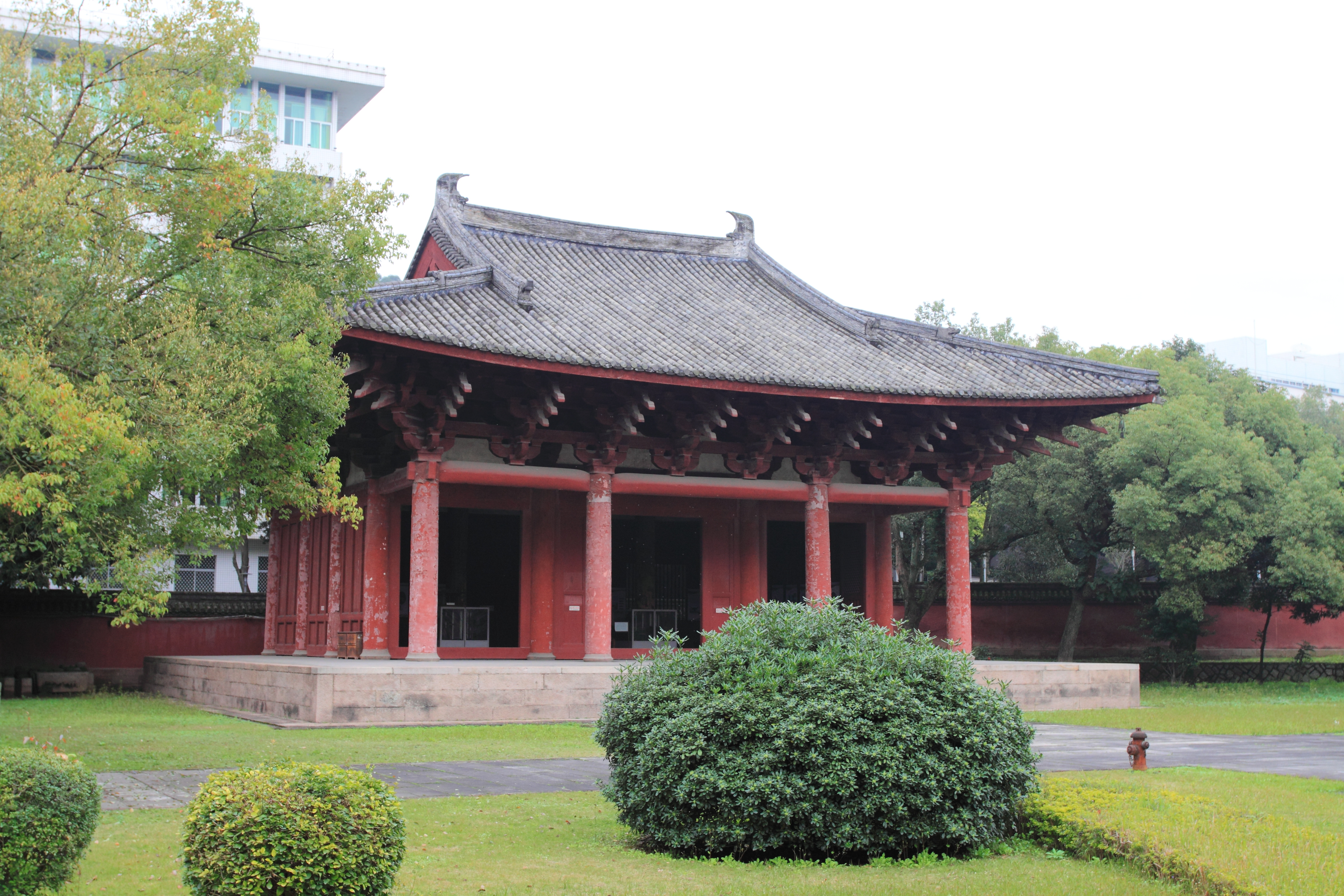
Hualin Temple in Fuzho City, Fujian

Jianzhou or Jian Prefecture (建州) was a zhou (prefecture) in imperial China centering on modern Jian'ou, Fujian, China. It existed (intermittently) from 621 to 1162.

== Geography ==
The administrative region of Jianzhou in the Tang dynasty falls within modern northern Fujian. It probably includes modern:

- Under the administration of Nanping:
  - Jian'ou
  - Wuyishan
  - Jianyang District
  - Shaowu
  - Zhenghe County
- Under the administration of Ningde:
  - Shouning County
  - Zhouning County
