= Li Yu (Southern Tang) =

Chinese ruler of Southern Tang from 961 to 976

Li Yu 李煜
- Ruler of Southern Tang (more...)
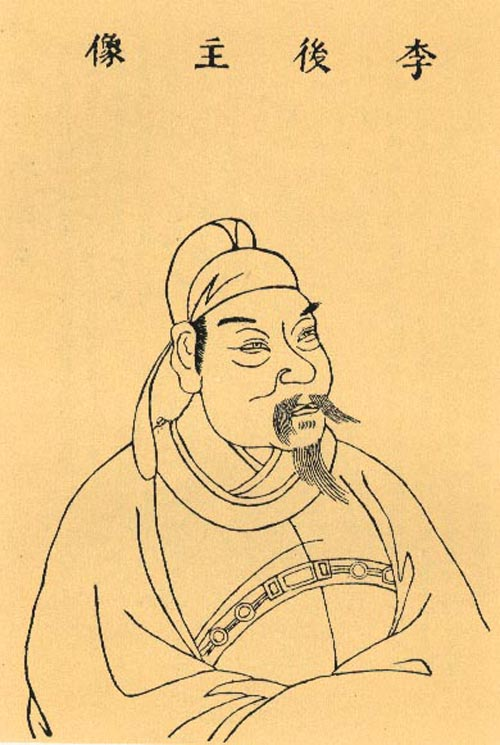
- an illustration from Sancai Tuhui (1609)

3rd and last ruler of Southern Tang
- Reign: c.13 August 961 – 1 January 976
- Predecessor: Li Jing (father)
- Born: c.15 August 937 likely modern Nanjing, Jiangsu, Southern Tang
- Died: 13 August 978 (aged 41) modern Kaifeng, Henan, Northern Song
- Spouse: Queen Zhou the Elder (d. 965); Queen Zhou the Younger
- Issue Another son died young: Li Zhongyu, son
Names
- Surname: Lǐ (李); Given name: Cóngjiā (從), later changed to Yù (煜); Courtesy name: Chóngguāng (重光); Royal titles Before enthronement: Before 959: Duke of Anding 安定公; 959–961: Prince of Wu 吳王; As ruler of Southern Tang: 961–971: King of Tang 唐國主; 971–975: King of Jiangnan 江南國主; After surrender: After 975: Marquess Wei Ming 違命侯
Era dates
- Jianlong (建隆): 961–963; Qiande (乾德): 963–968; Kaibao (開寶): 968–974; None: 974–975
Posthumous name
- None
- House: Li
- Dynasty: Southern Tang
- Father: Li Jing
- Mother: Empress Zhong

Li Yu
- Chinese: 李煜
Transcriptions
Standard Mandarin
- Hanyu Pinyin: Lǐ Yù

Li Yu (Chinese: 李煜; c.15 August 937 – 13 August 978), before 961 known as Li Congjia (李從嘉), also known as Li Houzhu (李後主; literally "Last Ruler Li" or "Last Lord Li"), was the third ruler of the Southern Tang state during the Five Dynasties and Ten Kingdoms period. He reigned from 961 until 976, when his state was conquered by the Northern Song dynasty. Taken captive to the Song capital Bianjing, Li Yu was given the title Marquis of Disobedience (違命侯), reflecting Emperor Taizu of Song’s resentment over Li’s delayed surrender. In 978 he was executed by poisoning on the orders of Emperor Taizong of Song.

Li Yu is regarded as an ineffective ruler but an accomplished artist, especially renowned for his ci poetry. His early poetry depicts courtly pleasures and romantic love, while his later poetry expresses profound grief over the loss of his kingdom.

== Family ==
Parents

- Father: Li Jing
- Mother: Empress Guangmu (光穆皇后; d.965) of the Zhong clan (鍾氏)

Consort and their respective issue(s)

- Empress Zhaohui, of the Zhou clan (昭惠國后 周氏), personal name Ehuang (娥皇)
  - Li Zhongyu, Duke Qingyuan (清源郡公 李仲寓; 958–994), 1st son
  - Li Zhongxuan, Prince Huaixian (岐懷獻王 李仲宣; 961–964), 2nd son
- Empress Zhou the younger, of the Zhou clan (小周后 周氏), sister of Empress Zhaohui
- Baoyi, of the Huang clan (保儀黃氏)
- Gongren, of the Bao clan (宮人喬氏)
- Gongren, of the Zang clan (宮人臧氏)

== Early life ==
In the same Chinese year Li Congjia was born, his grandfather Xu Zhigao, also known as Xu Gao (Li Bian) founded the state Qi (齊), renaming it Tang (known as the Southern Tang) 2 years later. When Li Congjia was 6, his father Li Jing became the next Southern Tang emperor. With Li Jing naming his younger brother Li Jingsui his heir apparent, his sixth eldest son Li Congjia seemed unlikely to ever succeed the throne. However, many of Li Congjia's brothers died very young, and after the death of the second eldest brother Li Hongmao (李弘茂) in 951, Li Congjia all of a sudden found himself right behind Li Hongji — the eldest brother — and uncle Li Jingsui in the succession line.

Li Hongji, a withdrawn and troubled young man, resented his crown prince uncle, whom he saw as a political enemy standing in his way. He also disliked his younger brother Li Congjia, even though they shared the same biological mother, Empress Zhong. Fearing the possible results of this family enmity, Li Congjia tried hard to be inconspicuous and focused on the arts, including poetry, painting and music. He loved reading, a passion encouraged by his father, also an acclaimed poet. At the age of 17, Li Congjia married Zhou Ehuang, chancellor Zhou Zong's daughter and a year his senior. Lady Zhou was not only highly educated but also multi-talented in music and the arts and the young couple enjoyed a very intimate relationship.

== Accession to the throne ==
In 955, a year after Li Congjia's marriage, Southern Tang was invaded by Later Zhou. The resistance war did not end until spring 958, after Li Jing ceded all prefectures north of the Yangtze River to his powerful northern neighbor. Li Jing also relinquished all imperial trappings, degrading his own title from emperor to king (國主). The national humiliation was soon followed by familial tragedy: later that year Li Hongji poisoned uncle Li Jingsui to death, which was followed by his own death a few months later, allegedly hastened by many encounters with Li Jingsui's vengeful ghost.

Not long after Li Hongji's death in 959, Li Congjia was given the post of royal secretary (尚書令) so that he could familiarize himself of governmental affairs. However, despite being the king's eldest surviving son, a few ministers considered him too dissolute and weak for the crown prince position, including Zhong Mo, who pleaded to have Li Congjia's younger brother Li Congshan chosen instead. Li Jing found Zhong's suggestion offensive and demoted him.

Suffering from poor health, Li Jing decided to transfer all responsibilities to his successor. He named Li Congjia the crown prince in spring 961 to take over in the capital Jinling (金陵; modern Nanjing, Jiangsu) while he retired to the southern city of Hongzhou (洪州; modern Nanchang, Jiangxi). A few months later he died, and Li Congjia officially succeeded the throne, not without a last-second effort by Li Congshan to challenge him. By then Zhong Mo had also died, so Li Congshan asked chancellor Xu You to bring Li Jing's last will to him. Xu refused and confided in Li Congjia of Li Congshan's intentions. Li Congjia — changing his name to Li Yu — did not punish his younger brother other than a slight demotion.

== As Southern Tang ruler ==
=== Appeasing the Song Dynasty ===
A year before Li Yu ascended the throne, Southern Tang's nominal overlord Later Zhou had been replaced by the Song dynasty established by former Later Zhou general Zhao Kuangyin, who had earlier participated in several campaigns against Southern Tang. Knowing the limit of Southern Tang's military strength and trying hard to be subservient to the northern court, Li Yu immediately sent a high official Feng Yanlu with a letter — whose language was of extreme humility — to inform Song of his succession. Things got to a rocky start: during his accession to the throne Li Yu built a golden rooster, a symbol of imperial power, the news of which infuriated Zhao Kuangyin. In the end, the Southern Tang ambassador in the Song capital of Bianliang (汴梁; modern Kaifeng, Henan) had to give the explanation that the golden rooster was actually a "weird bird" to satisfy the Song emperor.

Such an embarrassing relationship would define Li's entire reign, as tribute payments, both regular and irregular, drained the Southern Tang treasury. Essentially Li was ready to fulfill Emperor Taizu of Song's every demand except go to Bianliang himself. In 963, Li Congshan who accompanied a tributary mission was held hostage in Bianliang and had to write letters on behalf of the Song emperor asking his elder brother also join him at the Song court. Li Yu, naturally, did not heed the request.

=== Successive deaths in the family ===
Li Yu remained close to his wife Zhou Ehuang — Queen Zhou — so close that he sometimes canceled government meetings to enjoy her performances. The absences continued until a censor (監察御史) spoke out against it.

In around 964, the second of the couple's two sons, a three-year-old still called by his milk name Ruibao (瑞保), died unexpectedly. Li would mourn his son by himself so as not to sadden his wife more than necessary, but Queen Zhou was completely devastated and quickly deteriorated in health. During her illness, Li attended her and did not disrobe for days. When the queen finally succumbed to illness, Li mourned so bitterly until "his bones stuck out and he could stand up only with the aid of a staff." In addition to several grieving poems, he chiseled the roughly 2000 characters of his "Dirge for the Zhaohui Queen Zhou" (昭惠周后誄) — "Zhaohui" being her posthumous name — to her headstone himself. Part of the dirge read (as translated by Daniel Bryant):

孰謂逝者	Who is it says, of those departed,
荏苒彌疏	they grow more remote as times goes by?
我思姝子	I long for her, that beautiful lady,
永念猶初	eternally remembering, just as at first.
愛而不見	"I love her but I cannot see her";
我心毀如	my heart seems to blaze and burn.
寒暑斯疚	With chills and fever I am afflicted,
吾寧禦諸	can I ever overcome this?

There is speculation but no evidence that Li Yu engaged in a secret sexual relationship with the queen's younger sister, who was only around 14 at that time, before the queen died. A few months later, in late 965, disaster stroke again: Queen Dowager Zhong died after several months of attentive care-taking by Li. The subsequent mourning period delayed Li's marriage to the younger Lady Zhou until 968.

=== Deaths of Lin Renzhao and Pan You ===
After conquering Jingnan, the Hunan region and Later Shu, the Song Dynasty army set off to invade Southern Han in 971, Southern Tang's southwestern neighbor. Lin Renzhao, the Southern Tang military governor of Zhenhai Command (鎮海軍) centering in Wuchang (in modern Hubei), believed the opportunity golden to attack the Song cities around Yangzhou (in modern Jiangsu) as the main Song army would be a long distance away and already severely fatigued. Li Yu immediately rejected Lin's request: "Stop the nonsense talks, (stop) destroying (our) country!"

What Li was perhaps unaware was a year before, the Song military had gotten hold of an important chart with detailed measurements of Yangtze River crossing points, provided by a Southern Tang defector named Fan Ruoshui. After the conquest of Southern Han, their next step was to eliminate Lin Renzhao. In 974, Emperor Taizu of Song got hold of a Lin portrait through agents working in Southern Tang, and Li Congshan, the hostage kept in Bianliang, was then made to believe that Lin's loyalty was with Song. When Li Yu was told of this, he without a thorough investigation secretly poisoned Lin to death. Chancellor Chen Qiao angrily reacted to Lin's death: "Seeing loyal ministers killed, I don't know where I will die!"

During the same period, the scholar-official Pan You (潘佑) repeatedly submitted memorials criticizing the decline of Southern Tang governance and the complacency of those in power. His outspoken remonstrance angered Li Yu, who suspected, apparently without firm evidence, that Pan was acting at the instigation of another official, Li Ping. Li Ping was arrested, and Pan You, upon learning of the investigation and imprisonment, committed suicide.

=== Fall of Southern Tang ===
Li Yu was an incompetent ruler who spent more time on literature and art, with little regard to the Song dynasty as it eyed its weaker neighbor. In 971, he dropped the 'Tang' from his state's name, in a desperate move to please the powerful Emperor Taizu of Song.

Of the many other kingdoms surrounding the Southern Tang, only Wuyue to the east had yet to fall. The Southern Tang's turn came in 974, when, after several refusals to summons to the Song court, on the excuse of illness, Song dynasty armies invaded. After a year-long siege of the Southern Tang capital, modern Nanjing, Li Yu surrendered in 975. He and his family were taken as captives to the Song capital at present-day Kaifeng. In a later poem, Li wrote about the shame and regret he had on the day he was taken away from Jinling (as translated by Hsiung Ting):

四十年來家國	For forty years my country and my home —
三千里地山河	Three thousand li of mountains and rivers.
鳳閣龍樓連霄漢	The Phoenix Pavilion and Dragon Tower reaching up to the Milky Way,
玉樹瓊枝作烟蘿	Jade trees and jasper branches forming a cloudy net —
幾曾識干戈	Not once did I touch sword or spear!
一旦歸為臣虜	Suddenly I became a captive slave.
沈腰潘鬢銷磨	Frail my waist, gray my temples, grinding away.
最是倉皇辭廟日	Never shall I forget the day when I bade hasty farewell at the ancestral temple.
教坊猶奏別離歌	The court musicians played the farewell songs,
揮淚對宮娥	My tears streamed as I gazed at the court maidens.

== Death ==
He was allegedly poisoned by the Song emperor Taizong in 978, after he had written a poem that, in a veiled manner, lamented the destruction of his empire and the rape of his second wife Empress Zhou the Younger by the Song emperor.

However, this claim is likely a fictional account originating from Southern Song dynasty novels. According to official historical sources, including the History of Song (Song Shi), he is described as having turned gray before the age of thirty. Likewise, the widely circulated story concerning Empress Xiao Zhou (the Younger Zhou Empress) and Emperor Taizong of Song (Zhao Guangyi) does not appear in contemporary historical records and is generally regarded as a fictional narrative originating from Southern Song novels and unofficial tales (yeshi).

After his death, he was posthumously created the Prince of Wu (吳王).

== Writing ==
Li was interested in cí poetry, which sometimes seems to characterize poetry of the Song Dynasty. However, he is not a Song poet: the Southern Tang is more a successor of Tang and precursor of the Song side that existed during the Tang-Song transition, also known as the Five Dynasties and Ten Kingdoms period. Li Yu represents both a continuation of the Tang poetry tradition, as well as representing the cí poetic style associated with the poetry of Song.

Li Yu devoted much of his time to pleasure-making and literature, and this is reflected in his early poems. A second phase of Li's cí poems seems to have been the development of an even sadder style after the death of his wife, in 964. His saddest, poems were composed during the years of his captivity, after he formally abdicated his reign to the Song, in 975. He was created the Marquess of Disobidience (違命侯), a deliberately humiliating title for his prolonged resistance and delayed surrender. Though with the outward accoutrements of a prince, Li was a prisoner. Li's works from this period dwell on his regret for the lost kingdom.

He developed the ci by broadening its scope from love to history and philosophy, particularly in his later works. He also introduced the two stanza form, and made use of contrasts between longer lines of nine characters and shorter ones of three and five. Only 45 of his ci poems survive, thirty of which have been verified to be his authentic works, the other of which are possibly composed by other writers. Also, seventeen shi style poems remain to his credit.

=== Cí poetry ===
The roughly 40 (some of which incomplete owing to damaged manuscripts) cí poems possibly written by Li Yu are summarized in the table below. The cí as a poetic form follows set patterns or tunes (詞牌).

A few poems have been set to music in modern times, most notably the three songs in Teresa Teng's 1983 album Light Exquisite Feelings. Some of the songs are mentioned below.

Tune	First line	Notes
Cǎi Sāng Zǐ (采桑子)	Lù Lú Jīn Jǐng Wú Tóng Wǎn (轆轤金井梧桐晚)	
Cǎi Sāng Zǐ (采桑子)	Tíng Qián Chūn Zhú Hóng Yīng Jìn (庭前春逐紅英盡)	
Cháng Xiāng Sī (長相思)	Yún Yī Guā (雲一緺)	
Dǎo Liàn Zǐ Ling (搗練子令)	Shēn Yuàn Jìng (深院靜)	
Dié Liàn Huā (蝶戀花)	Yáo Yè Tíng Gāo Xián Xìn Bù (遙夜亭臯閑信步)	
Huàn Xī Shā (浣溪沙)	Hóng Rì Yǐ Gāo Sān Zhàng Tòu (紅日已高三丈透)	
Làng Táo Shā (浪淘沙)	Lián Wài Yǔ Chán Chán (簾外雨潺潺)	Tune written as Làng Táo Shā Lìng (浪淘沙令)
Làng Táo Shā (浪淘沙)	Wǎng Shì Zhǐ Kān Āi (往事只堪哀)	
Lín Jiāng Xiān (臨江仙)	Qín Lóu Bù Jiàn Chuī Xiāo Nǚ (秦樓不見吹簫女)	Tune written as Xiè Xīn Ēn (謝新恩); Missing one character in the sixth line
Lín Jiāng Xiān (臨江仙)	Yīng Táo Luò Jìn Chūn Guī Qù (櫻桃落盡春歸去)	Authenticity of the last 3 lines questioned
Liǔ Zhī (柳枝)	Fēng Qíng Jiàn Lǎo Jiàn Chūn Xiū (風情漸老見春羞)	
Pò Zhèn Zǐ (破陣子)	Sì Shí Nián Lái Jiā Guó (四十年來家國)	Shiao Lih-ju sang it in Mandarin
Pú Sà Mán (菩薩蠻)	Huā Míng Yuè Àn Lóng Qīng Wù (花明月暗籠輕霧)	
Pú Sà Mán (菩薩蠻)	Péng Lái Yuàn Bì Tiān Tái Nǚ (蓬萊院閉天台女)	
Pú Sà Mán (菩薩蠻)	Rén Shēng Chóu Hèn Hé Néng Miǎn (人生愁恨何能免)	Tune written as Zǐ Yè Gē (子夜歌)
Pú Sà Mán (菩薩蠻)	Tóng Huáng Yùn Cuì Qiāng Hán Zhú (銅簧韻脆鏘寒竹)	
Pú Sà Mán (菩薩蠻)	Xún Chūn Xū Shì Xiān Chūn Zǎo (尋春須是先春早)	Tune written as Zǐ Yè Gē (子夜歌)
Qīng Píng Yuè (清平樂)	Bié Lái Chūn Bàn (別來春半)	
Ruǎn Láng Guī (阮郎歸)	Dōng Fēng Chuī Shuǐ Rì Xián Shān (東風吹水日銜山)	Possibly by Feng Yansi
Sān Tái Lìng (三臺令)	Bù Mèi Juàn Cháng Gèng (不寐倦長更)	Authorship questioned
Wàng Jiāng Nán (望江南)	Duō Shǎo Hèn (多少恨)	
Wàng Jiāng Nán (望江南)	Duō Shǎo Lèi (多少淚)	
Wàng Jiāng Nán (望江南)	Xián Mèng Yuǎn (閑夢遠); 2nd line: Nán Guó Zhèng Fāng Chūn (南國正芳春)	Tune written as Wàng Jiāng Méi (望江梅)
Wàng Jiāng Nán (望江南)	Xián Mèng Yuǎn (閑夢遠); 2nd line: Nán Guó Zhèng Qīng Qiū (南國正清秋)	Tune written as Wàng Jiāng Méi (望江梅)
Wū Yè Tí (烏夜啼)	Zuó Yè Fēng Jiān Yǔ (昨夜風兼雨)	
Xǐ Qiān Yīng (喜遷鶯)	Xiǎo Yuè Zhuì (曉月墜)	
Xiāng Jiàn Huān (相見歡)	Lín Huā Xiè Liǎo Chūn Hóng (林花謝了春紅)	Teresa Teng sang it in Mandarin
Xiāng Jiàn Huān (相見歡)	Wú Yán Dú Shàng Xī Lóu (無言獨上西樓)	Teresa Teng sang it in Mandarin; Shiao Lih-ju sang it in Mandarin
Xiè Xīn Ēn (謝新恩)	Jīn Chuāng Lì Kùn Qǐ Huán Yōng (金窗力困起還慵)	Missing the rest of the poem
Xiè Xīn Ēn (謝新恩)	Rǎn Rǎn Qiū Guāng Liú Bù Zhù (冉冉秋光留不住)	Possibly missing lines and/or characters
Xiè Xīn Ēn (謝新恩)	Tíng Kōng Kè Sàn Rén Guī Hòu (庭空客散人歸後)	
Xiè Xīn Ēn (謝新恩)	Yīng Huā Luò Jìn Chūn Jiāng Kùn (櫻花落盡春將困)	Missing 2 lines
Xiè Xīn Ēn (謝新恩)	Yīng Huā Luò Jìn Jiē Qián Yuè (櫻花落盡階前月)	
Yī Hú Zhū (一斛珠)	Wǎn Zhuāng Chū Guò (晚妝初過)	
Yú Fù (漁父)	Làng Huā Yǒu Yì Qiān Chóng Xuě (浪花有意千重雪)	
Yú Fù (漁父)	Yī Zhào Chūn Fēng Yī Yè Zhōu (一棹春風一葉舟)	
Yù Lóu Chūn (玉樓春)	Wǎn Zhuāng Chū Liǎo Míng Jī Xuě (晚妝初了明肌雪)	Chang Chen sang it in Mandarin
Yú Měi Rén (虞美人)	Chūn Huā Qiū Yuè Hé Shí Liǎo (春花秋月何時了)	Teresa Teng sang it in Mandarin; Chan Ho Tak sang it in Cantonese; Huang Yee-ling and others sang it in Taiwanese; Huang Fei sang it in Taiwanese
Yú Měi Rén (虞美人)	Fēng Huí Xiǎo Yuàn Tíng Wú Lǜ (風回小院庭蕪綠)	

==== Poetry Examples ====
Poems like these are often invoked in later periods of strife and confusion by literary figures.

Alone Up the Western Tower (獨上西樓)

"Alone Up the Western Tower" was written after his capture. Here the poem is translated by Chan Hong-mo:

無言獨上西樓	Alone to silence, up the western tower, I myself bestow.
月如鉤	Like silver curtain hook, so does the moon glow.
寂寞梧桐	The fallen leaves of one forsaken parasol
深院鎖清秋	Make deeper still the limpid autumn locked up in the court below.
剪不斷	Try cutting it, it is still profuse –
理還亂	More minding will but more confuse –
是離愁	Ah, parting's such enduring sorrow!
別有一番滋味在心頭	It leaves behind a very special taste the heart alone could know.

This was also rendered into a song by Teresa Teng, "Jiangnan Remembrance" (望江南), second stanza:

多少恨，	Such hatred,
昨夜夢魂中。	Last night I departed in my dream.
還似舊時游上苑，	To enjoy the park as of yore,
車如流水馬如龍，	The carriages flow like water and the horses like dragon,
花月正春風。	Blossoms and the moon in the spring breeze.

=== Shi poetry ===
Li Yu's poems in the form of shi include:

- "Bìng Qǐ Tí Shān Shě Bì" (病起題山舍壁; "Getting up while Ill: Written Upon the Wall of My Mountain Lodge")
- "Bìng Zhōng Gǎn Huái" (病中感懷; "Feelings while Ill")
- "Bìng Zhōng Shū Shì" (病中書事; "Written while Ill")
- "Dào Shī" (悼詩; "Poem of Mourning")
- "Dù Zhōng Jiāng Wàng Shí Chéng Qì Xià" (渡中江望石城泣下; "Gazing at Stone City from Mid-River and Weeping")
- "Gǎn Huái" (感懷; "My Feelings") — 2 poems
- "Jiǔ Yuè Shí Rì Ǒu Shū" (九月十日偶書; "Jotted Down on the Tenth Day of the Ninth Month")
- "Méi Huā" (梅花; "Plum Blossoms") — 2 poems
- "Qiū Yīng" (秋鶯; "Autumn Warbler")
- "Shū Líng Yán Shǒu Jīn" (書靈筵手巾; "Written on the Napkin for a Sacrificial Banquet")
- "Shū Pí Pá Bèi" (書琵琶背; "Written on the Back of a Pipa")
- "Sòng Dèng Wáng Èr Shí Dì Cóng Yì Mù Xuān Chéng" (送鄧王二十弟從益牧宣城; "On Saying Farewell to My Younger Brother Chongyi, the Prince of Deng, Who is Going Away to Govern Xuancheng") — including a long letter
- "Tí jīn lóu zi hòu" (題金樓子後; "Written at the end of the Jinlouzi") — including a preface
- "Wǎn Chí" (輓辭; "Poem of Mourning") — 2 poems

"To the Tune of Liǔ Zhī" mentioned in the cí section may also be classified as a shi.

=== Prose writing ===
Li's surviving prose are miscellaneous in character. For example, "Dirge for the Zhaohui Queen Zhou" is rhymed and almost entirely in regular four-character metre, resembling the fu form a millennium before.

=== Calligraphy ===
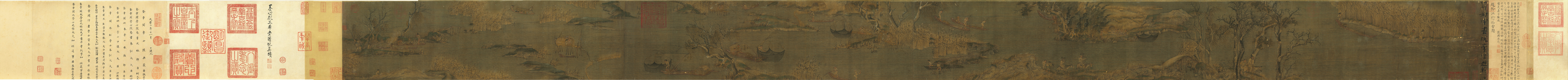
"Traveling on the River in First Snow" (江行初雪) by the Southern Tang painter Zhao Gan (趙幹), National Palace Museum, Taipei, Taiwan. The column of 11 characters on the right edge of the painting, which specified the artist and the title, was written by Li Yu.

Li Yu's calligraphy style has been dubbed "Golden Inlaid Dagger" (金錯刀) for its perceived force. As one Song Dynasty writer noted: "The large characters are like split bamboo, the small ones like clusters of needles; altogether unlike anything done with a brush!"

== Television series ==
Three independent television series focused on the complex relationships between Li Yu (Li Houzhu), Emperor Taizu of Song (Zhao Kuangyin) and the various women in their lives. They are:

- The Sword and the Song (絕代雙雄), a 1986 Singaporean series starring Li Wenhai as Li Yu.
- Love, Sword, Mountain & River (情劍山河), a 1996 Taiwanese series starring Chin Feng as Li Yu.
- Li Houzhu and Zhao Kuangyin (李後主與趙匡胤), a 2006 Chinese series starring Nicky Wu as Li Yu.

== See also ==
- Song poetry
- Tang poetry

== Notes and references ==
=== Sources ===
Primary sources

- (in Chinese) Wu Renchen (1669). Shiguo Chunqiu (十國春秋) [Spring and Autumn Annals of the Ten Kingdoms].
- (in Chinese) Toqto'a; et al., eds. (1345). Song Shi (宋史) [History of Song].
- (in Chinese) Ouyang Xiu (1073). Wudai Shiji (五代史記) [Historical Records of the Five Dynasties].
- (in Chinese) Li Tao (1183). Xu Zizhi Tongjian Changbian (續資治通鑑長編) [Extended Continuation to Zizhi Tongjian].
- (in Chinese) Sima Guang (1086). Zizhi Tongjian (資治通鑑) [Comprehensive Mirror for Aid in Government].
- (in Chinese) Quan Tangshi (全唐詩) [Complete Tang Poems]. 1705.
- (in Chinese) Lu You (1184). Lushi Nantangshu (陆氏南唐书) [Book of Southern Tang by Lu You].

Secondary sources

- Birch, Cyril, ed. (1965). Anthology of Chinese Literature: from Early Times to the Fourteenth Century. New York: Grove Press. LCCN 65-14202.
- Bryant, Daniel (1982). Lyric Poets of the Southern T'ang: Feng Yen-ssu, 903–960, and Li Yü, 937–978. University of British Columbia Press. ISBN 0-7748-0142-5.
- Chan Hong-mo (2011). The Birth of China Seen Through Poetry. Singapore: World Scientific. ISBN 978-981-4335-33-1.
- Chang, Kang-i Sun (1980). The Evolution of Chinese Tz'u Poetry: From Late T'ang to Northern Sung. Princeton University Press. ISBN 0-691-06425-3.
- Davis, A. R. (Albert Richard), Editor and Introduction, The Penguin Book of Chinese Verse. Baltimore: Penguin Books (1970).
- Dolling, Susan Wan (1997). A River in Springtime: My Story of Li Yu in Myth and Poetry. Austin, Tex.: Puck's Gold Projects. ISBN 0-9655255-0-3.
- Koh, Malcolm Ho Ping; Nair, Chandran (1975). A Translation: The Poems & Lyrics of Last Lord Lee. Singapore: Woodrose Publications.
- Kurz, Johannes L. (2011). China's Southern Tang Dynasty, 937–976. Abingdon, Oxon; New York: Routledge. ISBN 978-0-203-82861-8.
- Liu Yih-ling; Suhrawardy, Shahid (1948). Poems of Lee Hou-chu. Calcutta: Orient Longmans.
- Landau, Julie. 1994. Beyond spring tz'u poems of the Sung dynasty. Translations from the Asian classics. New York: Columbia University Press. ISBN 0-231-09678-X ISBN 978-0-231-09678-2
- Liu, Kezhang. 2006. An appreciation and English translation of one hundred Chines (i.e. Chinese) cis during the Tang and Song dynasties. Pittsburgh, Penn: RoseDog Books. ISBN 0-8059-9008-9 ISBN 978-0-8059-9008-9
- MacKintosh, Duncan and Alan Ayling. 1967. A collection of Chinese lyrics. Nashville: Vanderbilt University Press.
- Mote, F.W. (1999). Imperial China: 900–1800. Cambridge, Mass.: Harvard University Press. ISBN 0-674-44515-5.
- Nienhauser, William H, ed. (1986). The Indiana Companion to Traditional Chinese Literature. Indiana University Press. ISBN 0-253-32983-3.
- Pannam, Clifford L. (2000). The Poetry of Li Yu. Ormond, Victoria: Hybrid Publishers. ISBN 1-876462-10-8.
- Payne, Robert, ed. (1947). The White Pony: An Anthology of Chinese Poetry. New York: John Day Company.
- Sze, Arthur (2001). The Silk Dragon: Translations from the Chinese. Port Townsend, Wash.: Copper Canyon Press. ISBN 1-55659-153-5.
- Turner, John A. (1976). A Golden Treasury of Chinese Poetry. Hong Kong: The Chinese University Press. ISBN 0-295-95506-6.
- Wagner, Marsha L. (1984). The Lotus Boat: The Origins of Chinese Tz'u Poetry in T'ang Popular Culture. New York: Columbia University Press. ISBN 0-231-04276-0.
- Watson, Burton (1984). The Columbia Book of Chinese Poetry, from Early Times to the Thirteenth Century. New York: Columbia University Press. ISBN 0-231-05682-6.
- Wu, John C. H. (1972). The Four Seasons of Tang Poetry. Rutland, Vt.: Tuttle Publishing. ISBN 0-8048-0197-5.

Regnal titles
Preceded by Zhongzhu of Southern Tang; Li Jing (李璟)	Emperor of Southern Tang; 961–975	Succeeded by None (End of kingdom)
