= Feng Yanlu =

Feng Yanlu (馮延魯) (died 972?), also known as Feng Mi (馮謐), courtesy name Shuwen (叔文), was an official of the Chinese Five Dynasties and Ten Kingdoms Period state Southern Tang, and briefly of Southern Tang's northern neighbor Later Zhou.

== Background ==
It is not known when Feng Yanlu was born, but as his older half-brother Feng Yanji was born in 903, he must have been born after. His birth location was likewise uncertain, but whereas Feng Yanji was described as "from Guangling" (廣陵, in modern Yangzhou, Jiangsu) in Feng Yanji's biography in the Spring and Autumn Annals of the Ten Kingdoms and Feng Yanlu's biography in the same work was silent, Feng Yanlu's biography in the History of Song described his ancestors as from Pengcheng (彭城, in modern Xuzhou, Jiangsu) but his home as Xin'an (新安, in modern Huangshan, Anhui) — apparently coinciding with his father Feng Lingjun (馮令頵)'s service as the secretary of the bureau of salt and iron monopolies at She Prefecture (歙州, i.e., Xin'an), during Southern Tang's predecessor state Wu, suggesting that Feng Yanlu was born while, or around the time, Feng Lingjun served there. (Feng Yanlu's mother was described as Feng Yanji's stepmother, so Feng Lingjun probably married her after Feng Yanji's mother's death, although that is not completely clear.) While Feng Yanji and Feng Yanlu were half-brothers and would eventually be political allies, they did not have a good relationship, and neither did Feng Yanji with Feng Yanlu's mother.

In his youth, Feng Yanlu was known for his literary talent. During the reign of Southern Tang's founding emperor Li Bian, both he and Feng Yanji served on the staff of Li Bian's oldest son Li Jing. While serving at Li Jing's headquarters, Feng Yanji and Feng Yanlu had often advocated reversing the ban disallowing people from selling their sons and daughters into servitude, but Li Bian, agreeing with the advice of the official Xiao Yan (蕭儼) that that effectively would enslave the children of the poor in favor of the rich, disapproved. The official Chang Mengxi (常夢錫) often spoke to Li Bian against Feng Yanji, Chen Jue, and Wei Cen (魏岑), and Li Bian had considered removing them from Li Jing's staff, but had not yet done so by 943, when Li Bian fell seriously ill and thereafter died. Li Jing then poised to take the throne. Feng Yanji and Feng Yanlu were apparently put in charge of drafting the public will/final edict on Li Bian's behalf, and they inserted the provision allowing the sale of sons and daughters that they had advocated but Li Bian had disapproved of. Xiao submitted a report to Li Jing, pointing out Li Bian's prior disapproval. Li Jing reviewed Li Bian's archives and realized that this was the case, but decided not to strike that provision from the will, as it had already been published.

== During Li Jing's reign ==
=== Before exile ===
After Li Jing formally took the throne, he entrusted much of the governance to Chen. Feng Yanji, Feng Yanlu, Wei Cen, and Cha Wenhui (查文徽) were all in close association with Chen and influential in decision-making, and they were referred to by their detractors as the "Five Ghosts." Shortly after Li Jing took the throne, Feng Yanlu was promoted from his-then position of Libu Yuanwailang (禮部員外郎, low-level official at the ministry of rites (禮部, Libu)) to be Zhongshu Sheren (中書舍人, a mid-level position at the legislative bureau of government (中書省, Zhongshu Sheng)) and imperial scholar at Qinzheng Hall (勤政殿). When the governor Du Changye (杜昌業) heard this, he lamented: "The state uses offices and honors to encourage its subjects. If one could, merely by being favored by the emperor, reach great positions, then how would one reward those who have accomplishments?" However, as Li Jing favored Feng Yanlu as talented, he did not consider the promotions as being too fast, and, as Feng, as Zhongshu Sheren, was in charge of drafting and issuing edicts on Li Jing's behalf, Li Jing would often make the pronouncement, "I am bestowing an edict on the scribe, Feng Yanlu!" Feng Yanlu would dance and take the edict, causing Li Jing to laugh. It was said that Feng Yanlu was often advocating aggressive military campaigns to try to make a name for himself. Feng Yanji questioned him, "If you are diligent and proper at your job, you will surely gain the emperor's favor and honors already. Why do you advocate danger to gain benefit?" Feng Yanlu responded, "I, your younger brother, cannot simply hide myself and wait to be chancellor through seniority!"

In 945, when Cha was commanding an army attacking Southern Tang's southeastern neighbor Min's then-capital Jian Prefecture (建州, in modern Nanping, Fujian), Feng Yanji, Feng Yanlu, and Wei, as his allies, all greatly advocated for his army to be well-supplied, such that it was said that the imperial treasury was entirely drained, and that the people of nearby prefectures — Hong (洪州, in modern Nanchang, Jiangxi), Rao (饒州, in modern Shangrao, Jiangxi), Fǔ (撫州, in modern Fuzhou, Jiangxi), and Xin (信州, in modern Shangrao) — particularly suffered. Cha was eventually able to capture Jian Prefecture and force Min's last emperor Wang Yanzheng to surrender, allowing Southern Tang to take over a substantial part of Min territory. However, Min's traditional capital Fú Prefecture (福州, in modern Fuzhou, Fujian, note different tone) was still in the hands of the warlord Li Hongyi, who was paying nominal allegiance to both Southern Tang and its northern neighbor Later Jin. When Chen volunteered to go see Li Hongyi to persuade him to give up his control of Fú, Li Hongyi was arrogant to him and refused. Chen subsequently forged an order in Li Jing's name, conscripting the troops of Jian, Fǔ, Xin, and Ting (汀州, in modern Longyan, Fujian) Prefectures and putting them under the command of Feng Yanlu so that he could lead a campaign against Li Hongyi. After Feng's letter to Li Hongyi to encourage him to submit was rejected by Li Hongyi, Feng headed toward Fú. He was initially successful in defeating Li Hongyi's general Yang Chongbao (楊崇保), and the Southern Tang forces soon put Fú under siege. Li Jing put the senior general Wang Chongwen (王崇文) in charge of the siege, while making Feng and Wei monitors of the army. While Wang was a renowned general, the campaign was hampered by the fact that Chen, Feng, and Wei were interfering with his authority, and the generals Liu Congxiao and Wang Jianfeng (王建封) were also disobedient of him. Li Hongyi subsequently sought aid from Southern Tang's southeastern neighbor Wuyue, which dispatched a fleet commanded by Yu An (余安) to try to lift the siege. When the Wuyue fleet arrived, its soldiers were initially not able to land because the Southern Tang forces were defending the coast to prevent their landing. Feng allowed them to land so that, in his mind, the Southern Tang forces could defeat them, after which Li Hongyi would feel compelled to surrender, despite opposition by the general Meng Jian (孟堅). Once the Wuyue forces landed, however, they attacked the Southern Tang forces with great ferocity, such that Feng could not resist them, and had to flee. When Feng fled, the entire Southern Tang army withdrew. Feng tried to commit suicide with his sword, but his attendant saved him from death.

In light of the defeat, Li Jing blamed the defeat on Chen and Feng Yanlu for the forged orders, and so he pardoned all of the other generals but considered executing them. However, when the official Jiang Wenwei (江文蔚) submitted an article of impeachment that severely criticized not only Chen and Feng Yanlu, but also Feng Yanji and Wei, Li Jing thought that Jiang was exaggerating and, in anger, demoted Jiang. He had Chen and Feng Yanlu delivered in stockade to the capital Jinling. After the senior chancellor Song Qiqiu requested punishment for himself as well for having recommended Chen to go see Li Hongyi, Li Jing, apparently relenting, ordered that Feng Yanlu be exiled to Qi Prefecture (蘄州, in modern Huanggang, Hubei) and Chen be exiled to Shu Prefecture (舒州, in modern Anqing, Anhui). This drew objections from Xu Xuan (徐鉉) and Han Xizai, pointing out that Chen and Feng Yanlu deserved death and that, apparently, Li Jing was sparing them due to intercession by Song and Feng Yanji, such that army discipline would be lost, but Li Jing did not listen to Xu and Han. (When Feng Yanlu was delivered to Jinling in stockade, Feng Yanji lamented to him, "You, my brother, are not willing to be a chancellor based on seniority, and this is the results." This led to a worsening of the fraternal relationship.)

=== After return from exile ===
At a subsequent point, after Li Jing had declared a general pardon, Feng Yanlu was recalled to the imperial government to serve as the director of palace supplies (少府監, Shaofu Jian). In 953, when Li Jing were to send several officials to survey and comfort the various prefectures in his realm, Feng was one of the ones set to be sent out. When the lower level official Xu Kai (徐鍇) (Xu Xuan's brother) submitted a petition urging him not to send Feng, arguing that Feng had committed great offenses in the past and lacked the talent for it, Li Jing, in anger, demoted Xu Kai and sent him to the eastern capital Jiangdu. After Feng returned from his mission, he was made Zhongshu Sheren. Later, he was made the deputy minister of public works (工部侍郎, Gongbu Shilang) and the deputy defender of Jiangdu.

In 956, during the middle of a campaign that Southern Tang's northern neighbor Later Zhou was waging against Southern Tang, the Later Zhou general Han Lingkun (韓令坤) made a surprise attack on Jiangdu and captured it. Feng Yanlu tried to evade capture by taking tonsure, wearing a robe for a Buddhist monk, and hiding at a Buddhist temple, but he was nevertheless captured by the Later Zhou soldiers. Later Zhou's emperor Guo Rong released him and made him an official in the Later Zhou government, either as an imperial attendant (給事中, Geishzhong) or the minister of ceremonies (太常卿, Taichang Qing).

In 958, after Southern Tang had capitulated — with Li Jing submitting as a vassal to Guo and ceding the Southern Tang lands north of the Yangtze River to Later Zhou — Guo sent Feng and another Southern Tang official that he had previously seized, Zhong Mo (鍾謨), back to Southern Tang as his emissaries, to deliver his bestowments on Li Jing (of an imperial robe, jade belts, and silk) and the Later Zhou imperial calendar. (At that time, Feng was referred to as having the Later Zhou office of ministry of husbandry (太僕卿, Taipu Qing).) After both Feng and Zhong returned to the Later Zhou court, Feng was given the office of deputy minister of justice (刑部侍郎, Xingbu Shilang). Shortly after, Guo returned Feng to Southern Tang, along with several generals whom he had captured. Li Jing made Feng the minister of census (戶部尚書, Hubu Shangshu).

In 960, the Later Zhou general Zhao Kuangyin overthrew Guo Rong's son and successor Guo Zongxun, establishing a new Song dynasty as its Emperor Taizu. Guo Rong's cousin Li Chongjin rose at Yang Prefecture (揚州, i.e., Jiangdu) but was quickly defeated by the Song emperor — after he sought Southern Tang aid but was refused by Li Jing. Still, after Song forces quickly defeated Li Chongjin and Li Chongjin committed suicide, the Song emperor postured that he might cross the Yangtze and attack Southern Tang. Li Jing successively sent Yan Xu, and then Feng Yanlu (along with Li Jing's son Li Congyi (李從鎰) the Duke of Jiang) to pay homage to the Song emperor to reaffirm his vassal status. When the Song emperor, in speaking to Feng, accused Li Jing of communicating with a rebel to Song, Feng, surprising the Song emperor, responded, "Your Imperial Majesty only knew of communications, but not that my Lord was in fact participating in the treason planning." When the Song emperor asked for elaboration, Feng responded:

Li Chongjin's messenger stayed at the house of your subject. The Lord of the State [(i.e., Li Jing)] had someone inform him, "It is not unusual for men to want to rebel after becoming distressed, but this is not the right time. Earlier, when the emperor had just received the throne from the prior dynasty, when the people were not yet firm in their heart, and when there was a rebellion at Shangdang [(上黨, in modern Changzhi, Shanxi, where the general Li Yun had unsuccessfully risen against Song several months earlier)], you chose not to rise then. Now, the people's hearts are set, and you want to use several thousand ill-trained men to fight against the best troops under the Heaven. Even if Han Xin and Bai Qi were resurrected to help you, they would not be able to bring success. Therefore, even though I have soldiers and food supplies, I do not dare to help you." Because of this, Li Chongjin, lacking support, was defeated.

The Song emperor continued to threaten to cross the Yangtze to attack Southern Tang. Feng responded:

Li Chongjin considered himself to be more ferocious and capable than others, but when Your Imperial Majesty appeared with your holy might, he was defeated before he could turn his heels. We are a small state and cannot resist your heavenly strength. But Your Imperial Majesty should still consider this: our state has several tens of thousands of imperial guard soldiers, who were all personal soldiers of the former Lord [(i.e., Li Bian)] and pledged to live and die together. If Your Imperial Majesty is willing to abandon some tens of thousands of troops to fight to the death with them, then you may do so. Further, the great river is a heaven-made fortification, and its winds and waves are unpredictable. If you march forward but cannot capture cities, and there is no food supply route to the rear, you should be concerned.

The Song emperor laughed and responded, "I am merely toying with you, sir, not intending on hearing your persuasive speech." Further, at that time, the Song emperor was daily executing Li Chongjin's soldiers. Feng persuaded him that doing so was unjust when they were merely following Li Chongjin, and so he pardoned them. He subsequently rewarded Feng and allowed him to return to Southern Tang.

== During Li Yu's reign ==
Li Jing died in 961 and was succeeded by his son Li Yu. Li Yu sent Feng Yanlu — who apparently was going by the name of Feng Mi by this point — to submit tributes of gold, silver, silk, and colored textiles, and to report on his succeeding his father. Upon his return, he considered himself to have been accomplished on diplomatic missions. Li Yu held a feast in his honor in his palace — at which Li Yu not only personally poured wine for him, but also read poetry and played instruments in his honor, which a subject was supposed to decline in humility, but Feng did not. Li Yu did not take this against him, however.

In 962, Feng went on another mission to Song, and on this occasion, he requested that the Song emperor bestow to him an estate at Shu Prefecture (舒州, in modern Anqing). The Song emperor agreed.

In 971, Li Yu sent his brother Li Congshan (李從善) the Prince of Zheng on a diplomatic mission to Song. The Song emperor, while bestowing many honors on Li Congshan, detained him at the Song capital Daliang and did not allow him to return to Southern Tang. In 972, Li Yu, in fear, sent Feng to Daliang to beg that Li Congshan be allowed to return. When Feng reached the Song capital, however, he suffered a stroke, and it was sufficiently severe that he was unable to meet the Song emperor. The Song emperor sent imperial physicians to see him and returned him to Southern Tang. He died shortly after, after having possibly been made the governor (觀察使, Guanchashi) of Chang Prefecture (常州, in modern Changzhou, Jiangsu).

== Notes and references ==
- Spring and Autumn Annals of the Ten Kingdoms, vol. 26.
- History of Song, vol. 478.
- Zizhi Tongjian, vols. 283, 284, 285, 286, 290, 291, 292, 294.
- Xu Zizhi Tongjian, vols. 1, 2.
