= Feng Yanji =

Feng Yanji (Chinese: 馮延己) (per the Zizhi Tongjian and the History of Song) or Feng Yansi (馮延巳) (per the New History of the Five Dynasties and Spring and Autumn Annals of the Ten Kingdoms (903-June 23, 960), alternative name Feng Yansi (馮延嗣), courtesy name Zhengzhong (正中), was a famed poet and politician of the Chinese Five Dynasties and Ten Kingdoms Period state Southern Tang, serving as a chancellor during the reign of Southern Tang's second emperor Li Jing (Emperor Yuanzong).

== Background ==
Feng Yanji was born in 903, during the reign of the late-Tang Emperor Zhaozong. He was from Guangling (廣陵, in modern Yangzhou, Jiangsu). His father was named Feng Lingjun (馮令頵), who was a military officer at Guangling. He had at least one younger half-brother named Feng Yanlu, who would later also be a prominent politician. (Feng Yanlu's mother was described as Feng Yanji's stepmother, so Feng Lingjun probably married her after Feng Yanji's mother's death, although that is not completely clear.) While Feng Yanji and Feng Yanlu were half-brothers and would eventually be political allies, they did not have a good relationship, and neither did Feng Yanji with Feng Yanlu's mother.

At one point, Xu Zhigao, the adoptive son of Wu (which was the state that succeeded Tang in the lower Yangtze River region) regent Xu Wen, commissioned Feng Lingjun as the secretary of the bureau of salt and iron monopolies at She Prefecture (歙州, in modern Huangshan, Anhui). Feng Yanji apparently followed his father there, for it was mentioned that, in 916, there was a time when the prefect of She, Gu Yan (骨言), was very ill, and rumors spread that Gu was already dead, causing destabilization of morale among the soldiers. At Feng Lingjun's request, Feng Yanji, then 13, went to see Gu, and then, after exiting Gu's mansion, relayed Gu's words to the officers, causing the soldiers to be calmed. As he grew older, he became known for his elegance and writing skills.

== During Li Bian's reign ==
At one point, Feng Yanji, then a civilian, went to see Xu Zhigao — who had, by that point, seized the Wu throne and established a new state of Southern Tang and had changed his own name to Li Bian — and Li Bian made him a Mishulang (秘書郎, assistant at the Palace Library). After Li Bian's oldest son Li Jing the Prince of Qi was given the title of Generalissimo in 939, Feng was made his secretary, in addition to his then position of Jiabu Langzhong (駕部郎中), a supervisory official at the ministry of defense (兵部, Bingbu). Feng became a close associate to Li Jing's advisor Chen Jue, and as Chen was closely aligned with the chancellor Song Qiqiu, also became a member of Song's party. It was said he found ways to expel that of those who worked in Li Jing's headquarters who had higher positions than he did. He once jokingly spoke to a higher-ranked official, Sun Sheng, who carried the title of Zhongshu Shilang (中書侍郎, deputy head of the legislative bureau of government (中書省, Zhongshu Sheng), stating, "What abilities do you have, Lord, that you get to be Zhongshu Shilang?" Sun, who had long despised Feng, responded:

I, Sun Sheng, am only a foolish scholar from east of the Taihang Mountains. My writing is not as good as yours, Lord. My humor is not as good as yours, Lord. My trickery is not as good as yours, Lord. But the Master made you, Lord, a friend to the Prince of Qi in order to ask you to guide him with kindness and righteousness, not to spend time in entertainment and games with him. Even though I am not capable, your capabilities are enough to bring the state into danger.

While serving at Li Jing's headquarters, Feng Yanji and Feng Yanlu had often advocated reversing the ban disallowing people from selling their sons and daughters into servitude, but Li Bian, agreeing with the advice of the official Xiao Yan (蕭儼) that that effectively would enslave the children of the poor in favor of the rich, disapproved. The official Chang Mengxi (常夢錫) often spoke to Li Bian against Feng Yanji, Chen, and Wei Cen (魏岑), and Li Bian had considered removing them from Li Jing's staff, but had not yet done so by 943, when Li Bian fell seriously ill and thereafter died. Li Jing then poised to take the throne. As he was preparing to do so, Feng Yanji, who was happy about Li Bian's death and Li Jing's succession, often went into the palace to make reports to him, up to three to four times a day. Li Jing responded to his aggressiveness by responding, "A secretary has his own responsibilities. Why are you being so tedious?" He and Feng Yanlu were apparently put in charge of drafting the public will/final edict on Li Bian's behalf, and they inserted the provision allowing the sale of sons and daughters that they had advocated but Li Bian had disapproved of. Xiao submitted a report to Li Jing, pointing out Li Bian's prior disapproval. Li Jing reviewed Li Bian's archives and realized that this was the case, but decided not to strike that provision from the will, as it had already been published.

== During Li Jing's reign ==
After Li Jing formally took the throne, he entrusted much of the governance to Chen Jue. Feng Yanji, Feng Yanlu, Wei Cen, and Cha Wenhui (查文徽) were all in close association with Chen and influential in decision-making, and they were referred to by their detractors as the "Five Ghosts." Feng Yanji received the positions of Jianyi Daifu (諫議大夫) and imperial scholar (翰林學士, Hanlin Xueshi). He was soon promoted to deputy minister of census (戶部侍郎, Hubu Shilang) and chief imperial scholar (翰林學士承旨, Hanlin Xueshi Chengzhi), and soon received the title of Zhongshu Shilang.

As of 944, Li Jing wanted to eventually pass the throne to his younger brothers Li Jingsui the Prince of Qi and Li Jingda the Prince of Yan. Feng Yanji and his partisans wanted to use this case to control the officials' access to the emperor, and therefore encouraged him to issue an edict stating, "Li Jingsui the Prince of Qi shall oversee all policy matters. Of all the officials, only the deputy chiefs of staff Chen Jue and Cha Wenhui shall be allowed to report to the emperor; for all others, they shall not be allowed to do so unless summoned." This greatly shocked the state, and the imperial guard officer Jia Chong (賈崇) was eventually able to persuade Li Jing to reverse the decision.

In 945, when Cha was commanding an army attacking Southern Tang's southeastern neighbor Min's then-capital Jian Prefecture (建州, in modern Nanping, Fujian), Feng Yanji, Feng Yanlu, and Wei, as his allies, all greatly advocated for his army to be well-supplied, such that it was said that the imperial treasury was entirely drained, and that the people of nearby prefectures — Hong (洪州, in modern Nanchang, Jiangxi), Rao (饒州, in modern Shangrao, Jiangxi), Fǔ (撫州, in modern Fuzhou, Jiangxi), and Xin (信州, in modern Shangrao) — particularly suffered. Cha was eventually able to capture Jian Prefecture and force Min's last emperor Wang Yanzheng to surrender, allowing Southern Tang to take over a substantial part of Min territory. However, Min's traditional capital Fú Prefecture (福州, in modern Fuzhou, Fujian, note different tone) was still in the hands of the warlord Li Hongyi, who was paying nominal allegiance to both Southern Tang and its northern neighbor Later Jin. When Chen volunteered to go see Li Hongyi to persuade him to give up his control of Fú, Li Hongyi was arrogant to him and refused. Chen subsequently forged an order in Li Jing's name, conscripting the troops of Jian, Fǔ, Xin, and Ting (汀州, in modern Longyan, Fujian) Prefectures and putting them under the command of Feng Yanlu so that he could lead a campaign against Li Hongyi. However, the Southern Tang forces were eventually crushed in spring 947 by the relief forces sent by Wuyue's king Qian Hongzuo and were forced to retreat in defeat, ending Southern Tang's hopes of taking all of Min territory. (In light of the Southern Tang losses, it also soon lost effective control of the Quan (泉州, in modern Quanzhou, Fujian) and Nan (南州, in modern Zhangzhou, Fujian) Prefectures region to the warlord Liu Congxiao, although Liu remained in nominal allegiance to Southern Tang.)

Meanwhile, in 946, Li Jing had made Feng Yanji a chancellor (with the title of Tong Zhongshu Menxia Pingzhangshi (同中書門下平章事)), along with Li Jianxun. It was said that Li Jianxun was skilled in administrative matters but indecisive, while Feng was capable in literary matters, but was wicked and partisan in his decision making, often covering for his inadequacies by using grand words to persuade people of his correctness. After Li Jing formalized his intended succession arrangement by creating Li Jingsui the Crown Prince and Li Jingda the Prince of Qi in 947, Feng, wanting to ingratiate Li Jingsui and Li Jingda into believing that he was responsible for this arrangement, once, at a feast held at Li Jingsui's crown prince palace, caressed Li Jingda's back and stated, "You should not forgive me!" Li Jingda was offended, and immediately went to see Li Jing, demanding Feng's execution. Li Jing had to spend much time dissuading Li Jingda from the demand.

After Chen's and Feng Yanlu's defeat, Li Jing considered executing them, but when the imperial censor Jiang Wenwei (江文蔚) submitted an article of impeachment that not only dealt with Chen and Feng Yanlu, but also Feng Yanji and Wei, Li Jing was angered by what he saw as its exaggeration, and demoted Jiang. He subsequently exiled Chen and Feng Yanlu, rather than killing them. Subsequently, Feng Yanji was demoted to the title of Taidi Shaobao (太弟少保), an advisor to Li Jingsui. (Feng Yanji was apparently then given the honorary title of military governor (Jiedushi) of Zhaowu Circuit (昭武, headquartered in modern Guangyuan, Sichuan, then under the control of Later Shu), and then left governmental service for some time to observe a mourning period for his mother — or possibly stepmother (i.e., Feng Yanlu's mother) — and then was restored to a general title, and then made Taidi Taibao (太弟太保, senior advisor to Li Jingsui) and (honorarily) military governor of Zhaoyi Circuit (昭義, headquartered in modern Changzhi, Shanxi, then under the control of Later Jin's successor state Later Han.

In 952, Li Jing again made Feng Yanji chancellor, along with Xu Jingyun (徐景運) (who was removed not long after) and Sun Sheng. Feng also received the title of Zuo Pushe (左僕射, one of the heads of the executive bureau of government (尚書省, Shangshu Sheng)). When the edict announcing the commission of the three chancellors was publicly read, Chang Mengxi publicly ridiculed it by stating, "The edict was wonderfully written, but not as wonderfully as Jiang Wenwei's petition!" Sun, who did not have a good opinion of Feng, privately stated, "How is it that a golden goblet and a jade bowl now contains dog feces?" As chancellor again, Feng argued to Li Jing that chancellors should be given full authority to make decisions for the state, and Li Jing agreed, giving Feng full authority to rule on things, but Feng did not actually have the ability to do so, so he relied on his administrators for civilian matters and generals for military matters, without actually ruling on anything himself. Finding this situation untenable, Li Jing began making his own decisions again. However, when Xiao Yan, who repeatedly attacked Feng and who was then the chief judge of the supreme court (大理卿, Dali Qing), erroneously sentenced a woman to death, when other officials Zhong Mo (鍾謨) and Li Deming (李德明) wanted to use this opportunity to condemn Xiao to death, Feng defended Xiao based on his years of loyal service, and Xiao was spared. Because of this, Feng was praised by many. It was said that the reason why Feng was able to gain Li Jing's favor was that he constantly advocated strategies for taking the Central Plains. Feng became so arrogant that he showed open contempt for Li Bian's insistence on peace, praising Li Jing instead for Li Jing's willingness to use force.

One of the things that Li Jing had to decide shortly after Feng and Sun were made chancellors was what to do with the lands of Southern Tang's southwestern neighbor Chu, whose last ruler Ma Xichong had surrendered to Southern Tang in 951, ending Chu. Despite Ma's surrender, however, Southern Tang effectively only had control of one of Chu's three main circuits, Wu'an (武安, headquartered in modern Changsha, Hunan, i.e., Chu's former capital Tan Prefecture (潭州)). Wuping Circuit (武平, headquartered in modern Changde, Hunan) was in the hands of the Chu general Liu Yan, and Jingjiang Circuit (靜江, headquartered in modern Guilin, Guangxi) was seized by Chu's southern neighbor Southern Han. Li Jing's plans in 951 had been to take those circuits by force, but by 952, he was weary of the campaigns, and considered abandoning the Jingjiang project entirely and try to gain Liu's nominal allegiance by making him military governor. Sun agreed with the idea, but Feng opposed, arguing that acquiescing with just taking Wu'an would make Southern Tang appear weak. Li Jing agreed with Feng and continued the campaigns, but the general Li Jing sent to attack Jingjiang, Zhang Luan (張巒), was defeated by Southern Han forces with great loss. Subsequently, Liu launched a surprise attack on Tan, catching Southern Tang's military governor of Wu'an, Bian Hao, by complete surprise. Bian abandoned Tan and fled, leading to Southern Tang's loss of the circuit and effectively gaining nothing from the Chu adventure. In light of this, both Feng and Sun resigned their chancellorships, but retained their Pushe titles. However, Feng was again made chancellor in spring 953.

In 956, in the midst of a major invasion by Later Han's successor state Later Zhou, Li Jing decided to send a high-level delegation to meet with the Later Zhou emperor Guo Rong, hoping to persuade Guo to stop his campaign. The delegation was to be headed by Sun. Sun pointed out to Feng that, as Feng's title was more honored than Sun's, Feng should have gone, but that he would nevertheless go despite the dangers. As Sun feared, his efforts were unsuccessful, and Guo put him to death. The war only ended in 958 when Southern Tang capitulated and ceded all of its territory north of the Yangtze River, and also agreed to be a vassal to Later Zhou. After that agreement was reached, Li Jing sent Feng to Guo's court to submit a tribute of silver, textile, money, tea, and grains, for Guo's army to use. Shortly after, with Southern Tang now being a vassal, many high-level officials' titles were reduced to show submission to Later Zhou. Feng thus no longer was chancellor, and was made Taizi Taifu (太子太傅), senior advisor to then-crown prince, Li Jing's son Li Hongji (Li Jingsui's having by that point successfully resigned the crown prince title). He died on 960.

Feng Yanji was famous for his poetry, which he continued writing into old age. He particularly favored writing poems that could be set to music.

== Notes and references ==
- Spring and Autumn Annals of the Ten Kingdoms, vol. 26.
- Zizhi Tongjian, vols. 283, 284, 285, 286, 290, 291, 293, 294.
