= Wu Renchen =

Wu Renchen (吳任臣, [ǔ ɻə̂n.ʈʂʰə̌n]) (c. 1628 – c. 1689), with courtesy names of Zhiyi (志伊), Erqi (爾器) and Zhenghong (征鴻), and an art name of Tuoyuan (託園), was a Chinese historian, mathematician, politician, and writer during the Qing dynasty. Originally from Renhe (仁和; today's Hangzhou, Zhejiang), he gained recognition in the field of historical scholarship and was recommended in 1678 to take the special examination known as boxue hongci (博學鴻詞), which he passed in the following year. Thereafter, he became a corrector in the Hanlin Academy and contributed to the compilation of the official History of Ming, focusing on the section dealing with the calendar, in which he made special contributions. He is best known for writing the Spring and Autumn Annals of the Ten Kingdoms on the 10th-century Five Dynasties and Ten Kingdoms period history. This book, as well as his commentary on the Classic of Mountains and Seas, were later included in the Siku Quanshu, imperial encyclopedia of the Qing dynasty.

== Sources ==
- Tu, Lien-chê (1943). "Wu Jên-ch'ên" . In Hummel, Arthur W. Sr. (ed.). Eminent Chinese of the Ch'ing Period. United States Government Printing Office. p. 870.
