= 945 =

Calendar year

945 in various calendars
- Gregorian calendar: 945; CMXLV
- Ab urbe condita: 1698
- Armenian calendar: 394; ԹՎ ՅՂԴ
- Assyrian calendar: 5695
- Balinese saka calendar: 866–867
- Bengali calendar: 351–352
- Berber calendar: 1895
- Buddhist calendar: 1489
- Burmese calendar: 307
- Byzantine calendar: 6453–6454
- Chinese calendar: 甲辰年 (Wood Dragon); 3642 or 3435 — to — 乙巳年 (Wood Snake); 3643 or 3436
- Coptic calendar: 661–662
- Discordian calendar: 2111
- Ethiopian calendar: 937–938
- Hebrew calendar: 4705–4706
- Hindu calendars
- Vikram Samvat: 1001–1002
- Shaka Samvat: 866–867
- Kali Yuga: 4045–4046
- Holocene calendar: 10945
- Iranian calendar: 323–324
- Islamic calendar: 333–334
- Japanese calendar: Tengyō 8 (天慶８年)
- Javanese calendar: 845–846
- Julian calendar: 945; CMXLV
- Korean calendar: 3278
- Minguo calendar: 967 before ROC 民前967年
- Nanakshahi calendar: −523
- Seleucid era: 1256/1257 AG
- Thai solar calendar: 1487–1488
- Tibetan calendar: ཤིང་ཕོ་འབྲུག་ལོ་ (male Wood-Dragon); 1071 or 690 or −82 — to — ཤིང་མོ་སྦྲུལ་ལོ་ (female Wood-Snake); 1072 or 691 or −81

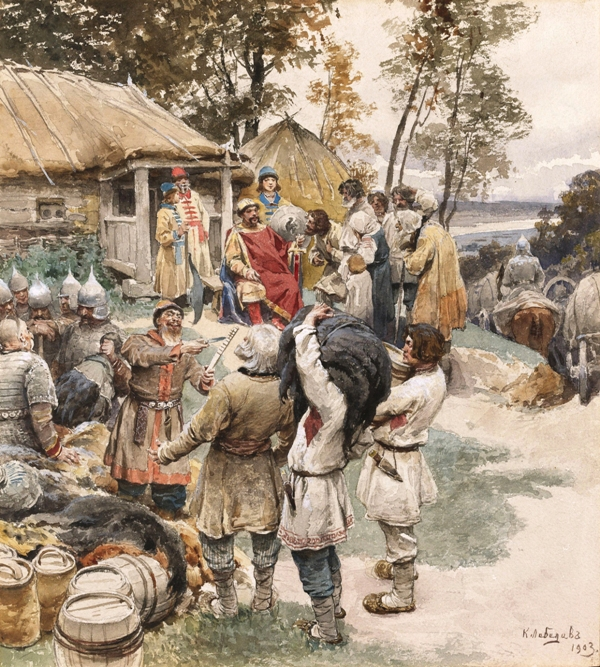
Igor I collects tribute from the Drevlians.

Year 945 (CMXLV) was a common year starting on Wednesday of the Julian calendar.

== Events ==
=== By place ===
==== Byzantine Empire ====
- January 27 – The co-emperors Stephen and Constantine are overthrown barely a month after deposing their father, Romanos I. With the help of his wife, Constantine VII becomes sole emperor of the Byzantine Empire. He appoints to the highest army commands four members of the Phokas family, which have been in disgrace under Romanos.
- Constantine VII concludes a Rus'–Byzantine treaty in which Rus' merchants are to conduct their trade in Constantinople. While many Rus' make their fortunes in trade with the Arab Muslims, the Rurik Dynasty of Kiev grows rich from Byzantine commerce.

==== Europe ====
- Spring – Berengar of Ivrea invades Italy with hired Lombard troops and takes up residence in Milan. Berengar proceeds to Verona, where he is joined by forces of Count Milo and other partisans.
- King Hugh of Provence lays siege to Vignola to put an end to Berengar's advance. But to no avail, as Berengar of Ivrea is hailed throughout northern Italy as a liberator, and Hugh flees to Provence.
- April 13 – Hugh of Provence abdicates the throne in favor of his son Lothair II (who has been co-ruler since 931) and is acclaimed as sole king of Lombardia. Hugh is allowed to retire in Pavia.
- Igor I, ruler of the Kievan Rus', is killed while collecting tribute from the Drevlians and is succeeded by his three-year-old son Sviatoslav I. His mother Olga becomes regent and the official ruler.
- Summer – King Louis IV ("d'Outremer") is captured by the Normans and handed over to Hugh the Great. In return for the release of Louis, Laon surrenders to him in compensation.
- Caliph Abd-al-Rahman III occupies the palace of Medina Azahara (called "the shining city") as the new capital of the Caliphate of Córdoba (modern Spain).

==== England ====
- King Edmund I conquers Strathclyde, forms an alliance with Malcolm I (king of the 'Picts and Scots') and cedes Cumberland and Westmorland to him.
- King Hywel Dda ("the Good") convenes a conference at Whitland, which draws up a standardized code of laws in Wales (approximate date).

==== Arabian Empire ====
- Summer – Sayf al-Dawla is defeated by Muslim forces under Muhammad ibn Tughj al-Ikhshid near Qinnasrin. He is forced to abandon his Syrian domains and flees to Raqqa. In October the two men come to an agreement, which recognizes Hamdanid rule over northern Syria, founding the Emirate of Aleppo.
- Winter – Muslim forces under Nasir al-Dawla capture Baghdad and restore Caliph Al-Muttaqi to power again. Al-Dawla establishes himself as amir al-umara, or de facto regent of the Abbasid Caliphate.

==== China ====
- Autumn – The Min Kingdom is destroyed by the Southern Tang. Emperor Yuan Zong expands its domains beyond those of the former Wu Kingdom. He annexes Min territory into its own boundaries.

=== By topic ===
==== Religion ====
- Dunstan becomes abbot of Glastonbury Abbey in England. He re-creates monastic life by establishing Benedictine monasticism in the monastery.

== Births ==
- Abbo of Fleury, French monk and abbot (approximate date)
- Adelaide of Aquitaine, French queen consort (or 952)
- Al-Muqaddasi, Arab Muslim geographer (approximate date)
- Al-Sijzi, Persian astronomer and mathematician (d. 1020)
- Eric the Victorious, king of Sweden (approximate date)
- Judah ben David Hayyuj, Jewish linguist (approximate date)
- Tróndur í Gøtu, Viking chieftain (approximate date)

== Deaths ==
- January 21 – Yang Tan, Chinese general and governor
- February 14
  - Lian Chongyu, Chinese general
  - Zhu Wenjin, emperor of Min (Ten Kingdoms)
- June 30 – Ki no Tsurayuki, Japanese writer and poet (b. 872)
- July 4 – Zhuo Yanming, Chinese Buddhist monk and emperor
- October 23 – Hyejong, king of Goryeo (Korea) (b. 912)
- Abu Muhammad al-Hasan, Arab Muslim geographer (b. 893)
- Adarnase II, prince of Tao-Klarjeti (Georgia)
- Bagrat I, prince of Tao-Klarjeti (Georgia)
- Fujiwara no Nakahira, Japanese statesman (b. 875)
- Igor I, Varangian ruler of Kievan Rus'
- Krešimir I, king of Croatian Kingdom
- Song Fujin, empress and wife of Li Bian
- Tuzun, Abbasid general and de facto ruler
- Wang Jichang, Chinese general and chancellor
- Yang Sigong, Chinese official and chancellor
- Zhang Gongduo, Chinese general and official
