= Chen Hongjin =

Chen Hongjin 陳洪進
- Duke of Qi
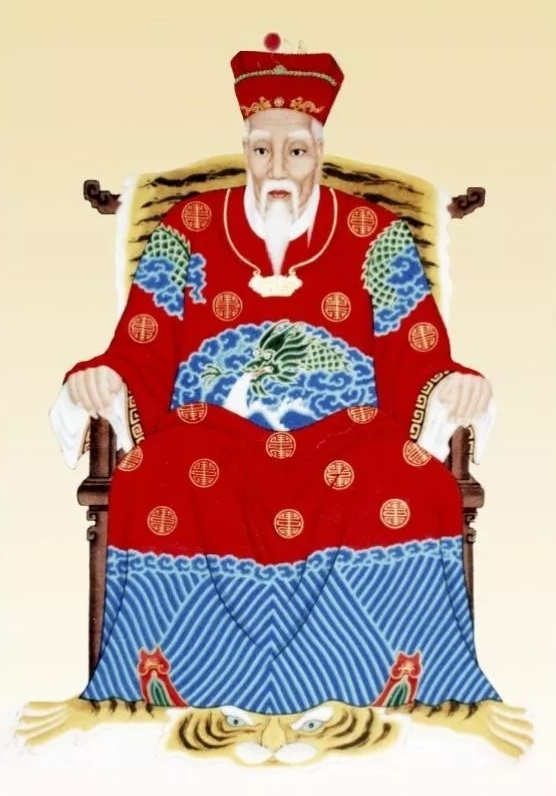

Jiedushi of Pinghai Circuit (平海軍節度使)
- Reign: 963–978
- Predecessor: Zhang Hansi (acting)
- Successor: none
- Born: 914; Xianyou County, Fujian
- Died: 985 (aged 70–71); Bianliang (present-day Kaifeng)
Names
- Chén Hóngjìn (陳洪進)
Regnal name
- Grand Preceptor of Inspection (檢校太師)

Chinese name
- Traditional Chinese: 陳洪進
- Simplified Chinese: 陈洪进
Transcriptions
Standard Mandarin
- Hanyu Pinyin: Chén Hóngjìn

Chen Hongjin (Chinese: 陳洪進) (914–985), courtesy name Jichuan (濟川), formally Duke Zhongshun of Qi (岐國忠順公), was a warlord late in the Chinese Five Dynasties and Ten Kingdoms Period, who controlled Qingyuan Circuit (headquartered in modern Quanzhou, Fujian). After a series of conquests by the Song dynasty, Chen, who was a vassal to Song, believed that it would be wise for him to surrender his realm, and did so. He subsequently remained honored as a Song general until his death.

== Background and service under Liu Congxiao ==
Chen Hongjin was born in 914. His ancestors were said to be originally from Linhuai (臨淮, in modern Suqian, Jiangsu), but had relocated south and settled at Xianyou (仙遊, in modern Putian, Fujian), and thus Chen was said to be from Xianyou.

Chen was said to be ambitious and studious in his youth, particularly spending attention to military strategies. When he grew older, he was known for an impressive stature and bravery, and became a soldier at Quan Prefecture (泉州, in modern Quanzhou, Fujian), which Xianyou belonged to. In a siege of Ting Prefecture (汀州, in modern Longyan, Fujian), Chen successfully climbed up the city wall first, and after the battle, became a deputy commander of the Quan army (副兵馬使, Fu Bingma Shi). (It is not completely clear which battle this reference was to. As this was before the subsequent events described here, it might have been referring to a 941 incident where then-ruler of Min, Wang Xi (Emperor Jingzong), concerned that his younger brother Wang Yanxi (王延喜) the prefect of Ting was getting ready to join the cause of another brother, Wang Yanzheng, who had risen against his rule at Jian Prefecture (建州, in modern Nanping, Fujian), sent the general Xu Renqin (許仁欽) with 3,000 men to launch a surprise attack on Ting, capturing Wang Yanxi.)

As of 944, the Min state was in turmoil, as the general Zhu Wenjin had just assassinated the emperor Wang Yanxi (Emperor Jingzong) and seized the throne, and was battling with Wang Yanxi's younger brother Wang Yanzheng (who had earlier declared himself the emperor of a new branch state of Yin) for the control of the realm. Zhu, after his coup, sent the general Huang Shaopo (黃紹頗) to serve as the prefect of Quan. The officer Liu Congxiao encouraged other officers, including Wang Zhongshun (王忠順), Zhang Hansi, and Dong Si'an (董思安) to join him in a plot against Huang, arguing that they, having been the long-term subjects of Min's ruling Wang family, could not stand by and allow Zhu to take over. They agreed, and they assassinated Huang and supported Wang Yanzheng's nephew Wang Jixun (王繼勳) to serve as the acting prefect, pledging their allegiance to Wang Yanzheng. Liu sent Chen to deliver Huang's head to Wang Yanzheng at Jian. When he got to Youxi (尤溪, in modern Sanmin, Fujian), he was intercepted by a Fu detachment that was taking position at Youxi. Chen declared to them, "The righteous forces have already killed Zhu at Fu. I am going to pay homage to the new emperor. Why are you still defending this position?" He also showed Huang's head to them. Upon seeing Huang's head, the Fu detachment scattered and fled, and several of the officers accompanied him to Jian to pay homage to Wang Yanzheng. Wang Yanzheng commissioned Wang Jixun as the prefect of Quan, and commissioned Liu, Wang Zhongshun, Dong, and Chen all as commanders of the Quan army. After Wang Yanzheng himself was attacked by and surrendered to Southern Tang, Quan came under allegiance to Southern Tang. In 946, Liu, alleging that Wang Jixun was incompetent, removed him; Southern Tang's emperor Li Jing then summoned Wang Jixun to the capital Jinling and left Liu in control of Quan. After Li subsequently commissioned Liu as the military governor (Jiedushi) of Qingyuan Circuit, Chen, serving as the commander of the army, shared the command with Zhang, who became deputy military governor, and Chen was said to have frequent battlefield accomplishments.

== Seizure and rule of Qingyuan Circuit ==
Liu Congxiao apparently died in 962. Under the account given in the Xu Zizhi Tongjian (also adopted in the Spring and Autumn Annals of the Ten Kingdoms), after Liu Congxiao's death, as Liu Shaoji was then on a tributary mission sent by Liu Congxiao to the Southern Tang court, Liu Shaozi took over as acting military governor. However, not long after, Chen Hongjin seized him and falsely accused him of planning to submit to Wuyue, and then delivered him to Southern Tang and supported Zhang Hansi, who was then the deputy military governor, as the new acting military governor. Under the account in Liu's biography in the History of Song, the coup happened before Liu Congxiao's death, and therefore (implicitly) Liu Shaozi never controlled the circuit—but under Chen's biography, it gave the same account as the Xu Zizhi Tongjian (i.e., the coup was during Liu Shaozi's rule).

It was said, though, that Zhang, on account of his old age, was incapable of governing the circuit, and most of the matters ended up being decided by Chen, whom he made the deputy military governor. Zhang was apprehensive about Chen's hold over the governance, and held a feast, intending to set a trap for Chen at the feast and kill him. Before the ambush could occur, however, an earthquake happened, shocking Zhang's adherents, who then informed Chen. Chen immediately left the feast before he could be ambushed. Zhang, now fearing that Chen would act first, had his own headquarters put under heavy guard. In summer 963, Chen took his soldiers and headed for Zhang's headquarters. When arriving at the headquarters, rather than attacking it, he simply ordered Zhang's guards to disperse, and the guards, apparently intimidated, did so. He then entered the headquarters and, finding Zhang in the inner chambers, locked the inner chambers, stating to him, "The soldiers and the civilian administrators all thought you, Lord, to be senile and crazy. They asked me, Chen Hongjin, to take over on an acting basis. You cannot resist the will of the people. Please yield your seal." Zhang, surprised and not able to think what else to do, turned his seal to Chen, who then announced the transition to the officers and administrators and took over control of the circuit. Chen moved Zhang to a retreat home and put him under house arrest there, under heavy guard. Zhang died of natural causes several years later.

Chen reported the events to Li Jing's son and successor Li Yu, who then commissioned him as the military governor of Qingyuan. However, he also secretly sent the officer Wei Renji (魏仁濟) to Song—which controlled the Central Plains region and had by that point forced Southern Tang into submission as a vassal—asking to directly submit to Song's Emperor Taizu (as Liu Congxiao had). The Song emperor accepted Chen's submission, and also wrote an edict to Li Yu explaining his decision in accepting a direct submission from Li Yu's subject. Li Yu responded, "Chen Hongjin is treacherous, like a rat looking in both directions. He is not worth listening to." Emperor Taizu issued a second explanatory edict to Li Yu, and Li Yu then acquiesced. In 964, then, Emperor Taizu commissioned Chen as the military governor—and changed the name of the circuit to Pinghai (平海). He also commissioned Chen's sons Chen Wenxian (陳文顯) as deputy military governor and Chen Wenhao (陳文顥) as the prefect of Zhang Prefecture (漳州, in modern Zhangzhou, Fujian). In summer 964, Chen Hongjin's mother died, but Emperor Taizu then formally recalled him to governmental service. It was said that Chen levied heavy taxes on the people and allowed the rich to substitute mandatory labor with money, in order to submit rich tributes to the Song emperor. Further, his administration was plagued by corruption, and the people were distressed.

In 975, Song conquered Southern Tang by force. In 976, Wuyue's king Qian Chu went to the Song capital Kaifeng to pay homage to Emperor Taizu. These events caused Chen to become apprehensive about his position. He sent Chen Wenhao to submit a tribute of frankincense, ivory, and dipterocarps. Emperor Taizu then summoned him to Kaifeng, and he decided to go. However, when he reached South Jian Prefecture (南劍州, in modern Nanping), news arrived that Emperor Taizu had died. He then turned back to Quan and declared a period of mourning for the emperor, rather than proceeding to Kaifeng to pay homage to Emperor Taizu's brother and successor Emperor Taizong.

In 977, Chen decided to go to Kaifeng to pay homage to the new emperor. Emperor Taizong sent the official Cheng Deyuan (程德元) to meet him at Su Prefecture (宿州, in modern Suzhou, Anhui) to welcome him. Once Chen arrived at Kaifeng, he was welcomed in a grand ceremony. Chen, then, under the advice of his staff member Liu Changyan (劉昌言), decided to surrender his territory (Pinghai Circuit, consisting of Quan and Zhang Prefectures) to the Song emperor completely. Emperor Taizong accepted, ending the semi-independence of the region. (Chen's surrender of the territory helped persuade Qian Chu to do the same with his Wuyue kingdom later in the year.)

== After surrender to Song ==
Emperor Taizong commissioned Chen Hongjin as the military governor of Wuning Circuit (武寧, headquartered in modern Xuzhou, Jiangsu), and gave him the honorary chancellor designation of Tong Zhongshu Menxia Pingzhangshi (同中書門下平章事). (However, by this point, military governorships were gradually waning in authority due to Emperor Taizu's centralization of the army.) He kept Chen at the capital Kaifeng, and awarded Chen a large award of platinum and a mansion. Chen's sons were made prefects of prefectures not far from the capital.

In 979, Chen accompanied Emperor Taizong on his campaign to conquest Northern Han. In 981, he was created the Duke of Qǐ. In 984, he was created the greater title of Duke of Qí (note different tone). Chen, in his old age by this point, then requested formal retirement. Emperor Taizong thereafter excused him from attendance of imperial meetings. He died of illness in 985, and was given posthumous honors.

== Notes and references ==
- History of Song, vol. 483.
- Spring and Autumn Annals of the Ten Kingdoms, vol. 93.
- Zizhi Tongjian, vol. 284.
- Xu Zizhi Tongjian, vols. 2, 3, 9, 10.

Government offices
Preceded by Zhang Hansi	Ruler of China (Southern Fujian) (de facto); 963–978	Succeeded by Emperor Taizong of Song
