= Liu (surname 留) =

Liú (留) s a Chinese surname. It is not among the 400 most common surnames in China according to the 2013 Fuxi Culture Research Association study.

== Notable people ==
- Liu Zan (留贊, 183–255), courtesy name Zhengming, a military general of the state of Eastern Wu during the Three Kingdoms period of China
- Liu Congxiao (Chinese: 留從效, 906-962), formally the Prince of Jinjiang, was a general of the Chinese Five Dynasties and Ten Kingdoms Period state Min
- Liu Shaozi (留紹鎡) was a nephew of Liu Congxiao, a warlord late in the Chinese Five Dynasties and Ten Kingdoms Period
