= Pan Chengyou =

Chinese statesman

Pan Chengyou (潘承祐) was an official of the Chinese Five Dynasties and Ten Kingdoms Period states Wu, Min (including Min's separatist branch state Yin), and Southern Tang, briefly serving as a chancellor during the reign of Yin's only emperor Wang Yanzheng (later Min's emperor).

== Background and service under Wu ==
It is not known when Pan Chengyou was born, but it is known that he was from Jin'an (晉安, in modern Fuzhou, Fujian). At one point, he served the state of Wu as the judicial officer at Guang Prefecture (光州, in modern Xinyang, Henan). At some point, there was a major legal case at the prefecture, but Pan's advice to the prefect was not heeded. He thereafter abandoned his commission and returned to his home territory, which was then ruled by the state of Min.

== Service under Min and Yin ==
After return to Min, Pan Chengyou served in its government, eventually becoming the deputy chief judge of its supreme court (大理少卿, Dali Shaoqing). Sometime after 941, when then-King (shortly after, emperor) of Min, Wang Xi (Emperor Jingzong), created his brother Wang Yanzheng, who then controlled the important city of Jian Prefecture (建州, in modern Nanping, Fujian), the Prince of Fusha as well as the military governor of Zhenwu Circuit (鎮武, headquartered at Jian Prefecture), Wang Yanzheng invited Pan to serve on his staff, making Pan his assistant in financial matters (度支判官, Duzhi Panguan).

At that time, despite the brief détente (that led to Wang Xi's creation of those titles for Wang Yancheng), Wang Xi and Wang Yanzheng had been engaged in a long-time military conflict. Pan advised the cessation of conflict, but Wang Yancheng paid no heed to his advice. When an emissary from Wang Xi (who had claimed imperial title by that point) arrived, Wang Yancheng demonstrated his army to the emissary as a show of force and was very arrogant in his words to the emissary. Pan knelt and advised more humility, and Wang Yancheng responded angrily by stating to his attendants, "Can the flesh of the panguan be eaten?" Despite this implied threat, Pan continued to beg Wang Yancheng for caution, apparently to no avail.

In 943, Wang Yanzheng declared himself emperor of a separate state of Yin. He made Pan the minister of civil service affairs (吏部尚書, Libu Shangshu) and chancellor with the designation Tong Zhongshu Menxia Pingzhangshi (同中書門下平章事). Pan's colleague, the circuit surveyor Yang Sigong, was made the minister of defense and chancellor as well, but with the lesser designation Lu Junguo Shi (錄軍國事). Still, Yang appeared to be trusted more by Wang Yancheng through his ability to extract funds for the emperor's use, including heavy property taxes and even taxes on daily essentials, leading him to receive the nickname "Skinner Yang" (楊剝皮).

Shortly later, Pan submitted a petition, pointing out 10 things that, in Pan's opinion, were problematic with Wang Yanzheng's rule of the Yin state:

1. His battles against his brother Wang Xi.
2. His heavy taxation and conscription of labor.
3. His conscription of soldiers and giving them heavy war burdens.
4. His allowing Yang's heavy taxation's, causing resentment for the emperor, but no other official dared to speak against Yang.
5. His establishment of many prefectures and counties in his small state, leading to administrative waste.
6. His concentrating on capturing Ting Prefecture (汀州, in modern Longyan, Fujian) from romp Min and thus not being concerned about possible attacks by Yin/Min's northwestern neighbor Southern Tang (Wu's successor state) and northeastern neighbor Wuyue.
7. His seizure of assets from wealthy merchants, his selling offices to the rich, and the result that the poor were the only ones punished.
8. His taxation of fruits, vegetables, fish, and rice at various river fords, gaining little in tax revenues and causing much resentment.
9. His not sending emissaries to Southern Tang and Wuyue.
10. His building of palaces and overexpenditures on decorating them.

In anger, Wang Yanzheng stripped Pan of his titles and forced him to retire to his mansion.

== Service under Southern Tang ==
In 945, after a Southern Tang siege of Jian, Wang Yancheng, who by then was carrying the title of Emperor of Min (as Wang Xi had been assassinated by his generals Zhu Wenjin and Lian Chongyu, who themselves were later killed in a countercoup led by Lin Renhan (林仁翰)), surrendered to the Southern Tang commanding general Cha Wenhui (查文徽), ending Min. Cha treated Pan Chengyou with respect. Southern Tang's emperor Li Jing subsequently commissioned Pan as the deputy minister of military supplies (衛尉少卿, Weiwei Shaoqing), and then the minister of vassal relations (鴻臚卿, Honglu Qing). Li Jing also entrusted Pan with advising on the matters of what former Min officials could be incorporated into his own administration, as well as how to adjust the administrative divisions of the former Min territory. Among the former Min officials that he recommended who would later serve Southern Tang well included Chen Hui (陳誨), Lin Renzhao (林仁肇, Lin Renhan's younger brother), Xu Wenzhen (許文稹), Chen Decheng (陳德誠), and Zheng Yanhua (鄭彥華). After he grew older and ill, he requested to retire, and was allowed to retire to a mountain west of Hong Prefecture (洪州, in modern Nanchang, Jiangxi), where he would die. His son Pan Shenxiu (潘慎修) would later serve an official of the succeeding Song dynasty.

== Notes and references ==
- Spring and Autumn Annals of the Ten Kingdoms, vol. 96.
- Zizhi Tongjian, vols. 281, 282, 293.
