= Li Renda =

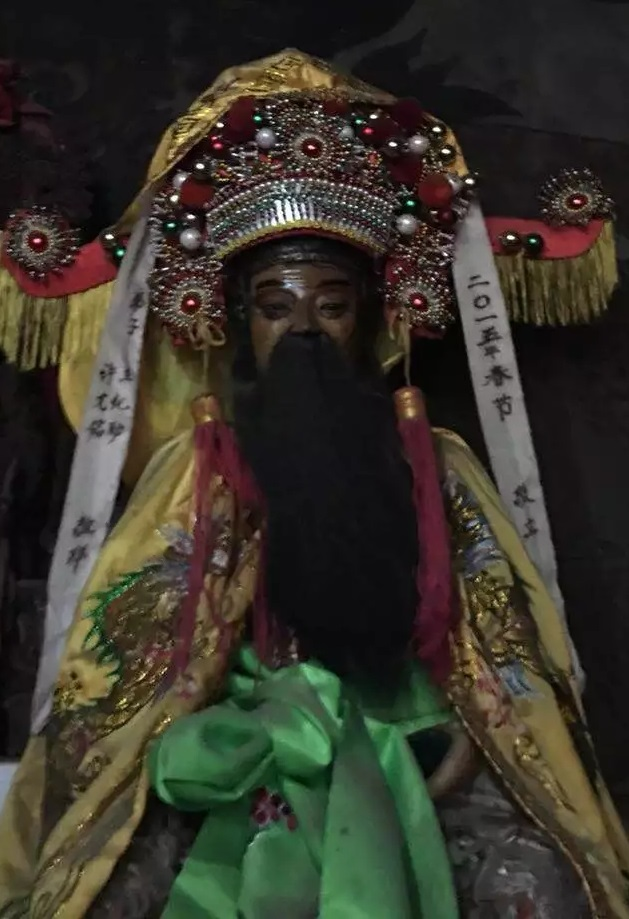
Statue of Li Renda

Li Renda (李仁達) (died 947), also known by the names of Li Hongyi (李弘義) (945–946), Li Hongda (李弘達) (946), Li Da (李達) (946–947), and Li Ruyun (李孺贇) (947), was a warlord of the Chinese Five Dynasties and Ten Kingdoms Period. He was initially an officer for the state of Min. In Min's last years, he rebelled against its last emperor Wang Yanzheng and seized control of the Fu Prefecture (福州, in modern Fuzhou, Fujian) region, initially in nominal allegiance to both Southern Tang and Later Jin. When Southern Tang's emperor Li Jing tried to force to yield actual control to the Southern Tang imperial government, however, he turned his allegiance to Wuyue and fought off the Southern Tang attack with Wuyue aid. When his relationship with the Wuyue general Bao Xiurang (鮑修讓) eventually broke down, he considered killing Bao and resubmitting to Southern Tang, but Bao discovered this and killed him first, allowing Wuyue to take actual control over the region.

== Background and rebellion against Min ==
It is not known when Li Renda was born. He was said to be "of Guang Prefecture" (光州, in modern Xinyang, Henan)—but that probably did not denote that he was born there, but rather that his ancestors were from there, as the original Guang Prefectures immigrants to the Fujian region were led by Wang Chao, the brother of Min's founder Wang Shenzhi (Prince Zhongyi), in deciding to remain, in 885—six decades before Li Renda's coming of power.

Li Renda himself at some point became an officer—the commander of the Yuancong Corps (元從)—for Min, but after reaching that position, did not receive another promotion for 15 years. During the time that Wang Shenzhi's son Wang Xi (Emperor Jingzong) (with his capital at Min's traditional capital Fu Prefecture) and his younger brother Wang Yanzheng (with his headquarters at Jian Prefecture (建州, in modern Nanping, Fujian) and who would later claim the title of emperor of a new branch state of Yin) were engaged in civil war, Li defected from Wang Xi's imperial regime to Wang Yanzheng, who made Li one of his generals. However, when the general Zhu Wenjin assassinated Wang Xi in 944 and claimed the throne himself, Li redefected to Zhu and offered strategies to capture Jian. Zhu, disliking Li for his treacherousness, refused to give him any commissions and forced him into retirement at Fuqing (福清, in modern Fuzhou).

In late 944, Zhu had in turn been assassinated by the officer Lin Renhan (林仁翰), who then submitted Fu to Wang Yanzheng's control. Wang Yanzheng reclaimed the title of Emperor of Min but decided not to move the capital back from Jian to Fu, believing that he needed to remain at Jian to resist an incoming Southern Tang invasion. Instead, he commissioned his nephew Wang Jichang to oversee Fu, which he made the southern capital. He sent the general Huang Renfeng (黃仁諷) to assist Wang Jichang.

With Fu under Wang Yanzheng's control, Li was concerned what would happen to him. Similarly concerned was one Chen Jixun (陳繼珣), who had defected from Wang Yanzheng to Wang Xi. They decided to approach Huang, arguing to him that Wang Yanzheng himself was in a precarious position due to the Southern Tang attack, and that Huang should rebel against him and seize Fu. Huang agreed. These co-conspirators then led the soldiers and attacked the headquarters, killing Wang Jichang and another general Wang Yanzheng left to assist Wang Jichang, Wu Chengyi (吳成義).

== Under the Zhuo Yanming regime ==
It was said that Li Renda considered immediately taking power himself but did not believe that the soldiers would be ready to follow him. Therefore, knowing that Zhuo Yanming, a monk at Xuefeng Temple (雪峰寺), had long been respected by the people, and therefore proclaimed, "This monk has multiple pupils, and has arms reaching below his knees. These are signs of a true Son of Heaven." He proclaimed Zhuo emperor and put imperial robes on him — yet simultaneously, having the regime use the era name of Later Jin and sending emissaries to Later Jin to pledge loyalty.

When Wang Yanzheng heard this, he slaughtered Huang Renfeng's family and sent the general Zhang Hanzhen (張漢真) to rendezvous with troops from Zhang (漳州, in modern Zhangzhou, Fujian) and Quan (泉州, in modern Quanzhou, Fujian), which had recently submitted to him, to attack the new Zhuo regime. When Zhang's army arrived at Fu, however, Huang, having received news that his family had been slaughtered, fought with great ferocity, and he defeated and captured Zhang, who was then executed.

Li put himself in command of Zhuo's imperial guards, and had Huang defend Fu's west gate and Chen Jixun defend its north gate. However, one day, Huang lamented to Chen his regrets in rebelling against Wang Yanzheng, stating:

For a person to be human, he is to be faithful, honorable, kind, and righteous. I had previously contributed to the reign of the Prince of Fusha [(i.e., Wang Yanzheng, who carried that title before taking imperial title)], but I rebelled against him, so I am not faithful. He entrusted his nephew to me, but I killed his nephew with others, so I am not honorable. I lead the soldiers in fighting the soldiers from Jian, and the people we kill are all old acquaintances, so I am not kind. I abandoned my wife and children so that others could slaughter them, so I am not righteous. I have no usefulness left, and even if I died I would still be shamed.

Chen warned him that lamenting in this way would bring disaster, but Huang apparently continued to do so. When Li became aware, he had others falsely accuse Huang and Chen of treason and had them arrested and executed. After their death, Li consolidated the command in his own hands. Not long after, he held a grand review of the troops and had Zhuo attend to view them. At the review, he had a soldier assassinate Zhuo. (Zhuo's father, whom Zhuo had honored as retired emperor, was also put to death.) Soldiers that Li had pre-conspired with placed him on Zhuo's throne. Li, however, did not claim imperial title, but rather only claimed the title of acting military governor of Weiwu Circuit (威武, traditionally headquartered at Fu). He started using Southern Tang's Baoda era name, yet at the same time also sent emissaries to pledge allegiance to Later Jin and to establish friendly relations with Wuyue. Southern Tang's emperor Li Jing made Li Renda the military governor of Weiwu and honorary chancellor (同中書門下平章事, Tong Zhongshu Menxia Pingzhangshi), and added him to the roll of imperial clan members (as he shared the surname of Li with the Southern Tang emperors). Li Jing also gave him a new name of Li Hongyi.

== Under dual allegiance to Southern Tang and Later Jin ==
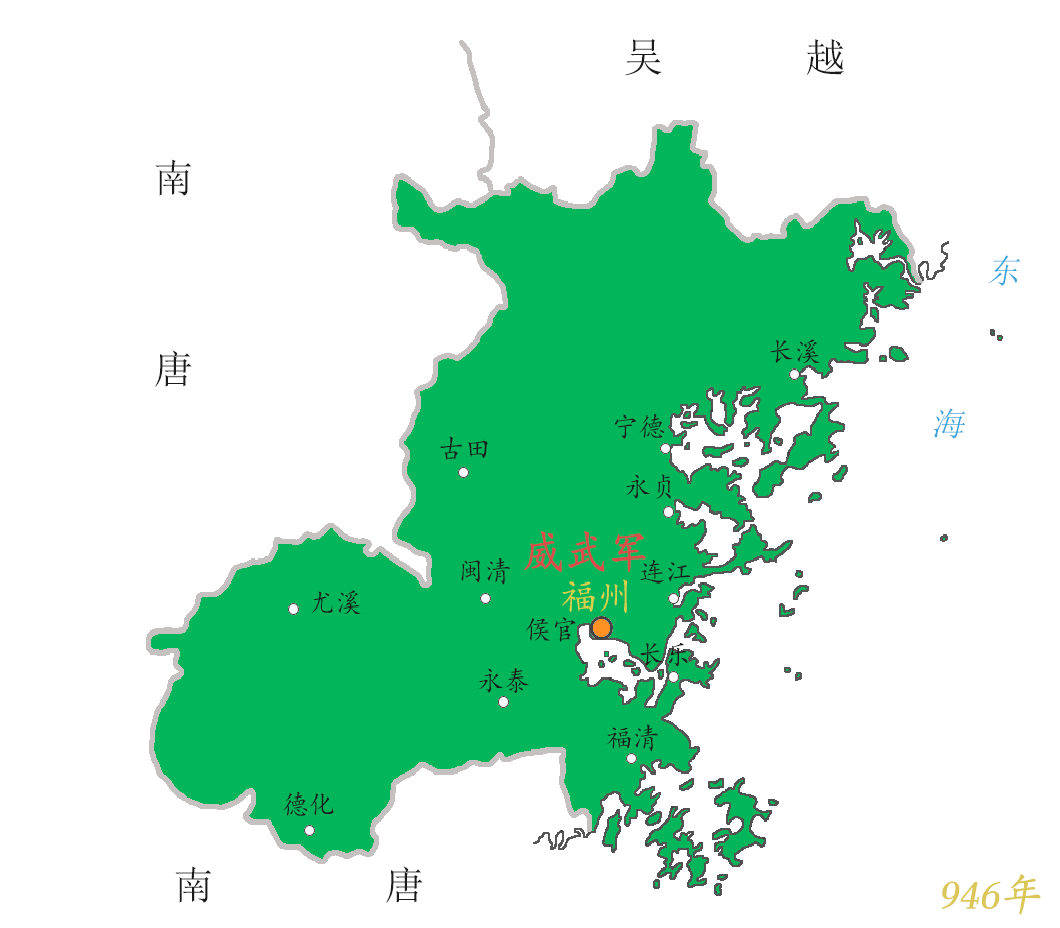
Map of Weiwu Circuit (Li Renda's control area)

In fall 945, Jian Prefecture fell to the sieging Southern Tang troops commanded by the general Cha Wenhui (查文徽). Wang Yanzheng surrendered, ending Min, and subsequently, all of the former Min realm (at least nominally) submitted to Southern Tang. Subsequently, a member of the Min imperial clan, Wang Jixun (王繼勳), who was then the prefect of Quan, wrote to Li Renda, offering to establish friendly relations, but Li Renda took offense, as traditionally, Quan was part of and subordinate to the military governor of Weiwu; he thus sent his younger brother Li Hongtong (李弘通) to attack Quan in late-spring 946. Wang Jixun's officer Liu Congxiao used this as an opportunity to depose Wang and take over Quan, and then repelled Li Hongtong's attack.

Previously, when Cha captured Jian, there were suggestions made to the Southern Tang court that the army advance and take over Fu as well. Li Jing declined ordering so, and his chief of staff Chen Jue offered to go on a diplomatic mission to Fu, to try to persuade Li Hongyi to give up his de facto self-governing status and report to the Southern Tang capital Jinling. To try to show good grace to Li Hongyi, before Chen's mission, Li Jing bestowed lady titles on Li Hongyi's mother and wife and granted offices to his four younger brothers. Further, Chen arrived at Fu with gold and silk to be awarded to Li Hongyi. However, Li Hongyi, knowing what Chen was there to do, treated Chen with coldness and disrespect. Fearful, Chen left Fu without even bringing up the matter of summoning him to Jinling.

As Chen was on the way back to Jinling, when he reached Jian Prefecture (劍州, in modern Nanping, note different location than the former Min capital), he issued edicts in Li Jing's name (without Li Jing's approval) ordering Li Hongyi to report to Jinling. The false edict also named Chen the acting overseer at Fu and launched troops from Ting (汀州, in modern Longyan, Fujian), Jian (the former Min capital), Fǔ (撫州, in modern Fuzhou, Jiangxi, note different location), and Xin (信州, in modern Shangrao, Jiangxi) Prefectures, under the command of the Jian army monitor Feng Yanlu, to head toward Fu to pressure Li Hongyi. When Feng wrote Li Hongyi to try to persuade him to give up his control of Fu, however, Li Hongyi responded and challenged him to a battle. While Feng initially defeated Li Hongyi's general Yang Chongbao (楊崇保), they were defeated at Fu when engaging Li Hongyi himself. Li Jing, initially angry that Chen had forged his edict, decided to try to reinforce his and Feng's army to try to defeat Li Hongyi, and therefore put the senior general Wang Chongwen (王崇文) in command of an army to further siege Fu. The outer city quickly fell, but Li Hongyi was able to hold the defense of the inner city, and the Southern Tang attack bogged down.

== Break with Southern Tang and allegiance to Wuyue ==
Li Hongyi changed his name to Li Hongda, apparently to show a break with Southern Tang, and submitted a petition to submit to Later Jin. Later Jin's emperor Shi Chonggui commissioned him the military governor of Weiwu and the overseer of the state of Min.

Li Hongda then again changed his name to Li Da (apparently in naming taboo for Wuyue's king Qian Hongzuo), and sought aid from Wuyue, offering to submit as a subject. An initial Wuyue attachment quickly arrived at Fu and helped him defend the city, but was unable to break the Southern Tang siege, which became tighter and tighter. However, the Southern Tang army was hampered by discord — as while Wang Chongwen was the overall commander of the army, the officials Chen Jue, Feng Yanlu, and Wei Cen (魏岑) all tried to give orders as well, while Liu Congxiao and Wang Jianfeng (王建封) were also not obedient of Wang Chongwen's orders. When another Wuyue detachment, commanded by the general Yu An (余安) arrived, Feng, taking it lightly, advocated allowing it to land so that it could be destroyed on land. Instead, once the Wuyue forces landed, it coalesced fiercely and crushed the Southern Tang forces, forcing them to withdraw. Yu entered the city and took up position there with a Wuyue garrison. Yu subsequently returned to the Wuyue capital Qiantang, and Qian sent the general Bao Xiurang (鮑修讓) to command the Wuyue garrison at Fu.

In July 947, Qian Hongzuo died and was succeeded by his brother Qian Hongzong. Li Da, leaving his brother Li Tong (i.e., Li Hongtong, who apparently also changed his name at the time that Li Da changed his) at Fu as the acting military governor, went to Qiantang to pay homage to the new king. Qian Hongzong bestowed on him the greater honorary chancellor title Shizhong (侍中) and gave him a new name of Li Ruyun. Li Ruyun soon became apprehensive that Qian Hongzong might keep him at Qiantang, and, using 20 gold bamboo shoots, bribed the powerful general Hu Jinsi, requesting to be allowed to return to Fu. Hu thus spoke on Li's behalf, and Qian allowed Li to return to Fu.

== Death ==
At some point, however, Li Ruyun developed a discord with Bao Xiurang, and therefore considered assassinating Bao and resubmitting to Southern Tang. When Bao realized this, he acted first and attacked Li's mansion, killing him and slaughtering his family, including his brother Li Tong. Bao delivered Li Ruyun's head to Qiantang, and Qian Hongzong subsequently sent the chancellor Wu Cheng to take over as the military governor of Weiwu.

== Notes and references ==
- Spring and Autumn Annals of the Ten Kingdoms, vol. 98.
- Zizhi Tongjian, vols. 284, 285, 286, 287.

Government offices
Preceded by Wang Yanzheng of Min	Ruler of China (Northeastern Fujian) (de facto); 945–947	Succeeded by Qian Hongzong of Wuyue
