= House of Wang (disambiguation) =

House of Wang usually refers to the ruling house of the Korean Goryeo kingdom.

House of Wang may also refer to the ruling houses of these Chinese states:

- Rulers of Former Shu (907–925)
- Rulers of Min (Ten Kingdoms) (909–945) and Yin (Five Dynasties period) (943–945)
