= Quanzhang =

Quanzhang may refer to:

- Quanzhang, Shanxi (泉掌), a town in Xinjiang County, Shanxi, China
- Quanzhang (泉漳), a coastal region in southeastern Fujian, China, centering around Quanzhou and Zhangzhou
  - Qingyuan Jiedushi, de facto independent warlords who controlled this region from c. 947 to 978 during the Five Dynasties period and Song dynasty
  - Hokkien, also known as Quanzhang dialect

== See also ==
- Hoklo, native Hokkien speakers
