= Liu Shaozi =

Liu Shaozi 留紹鎡
- acting Jiedushi of Qingyuan Circuit

acting Jiedushi of Qingyuan Circuit (清源軍留後)
- Reign: 962
- Predecessor: Liu Congxiao (Jiedushi)
- Successor: Zhang Hansi (acting)
- Born: unknown
- Died: unknown
Names
- Liú Shàozī (留紹鎡)
Era dates
- Adopted Northern Song's era name: Jianlong (建隆): 962
- Father: Liu Congyuan

Chinese name
- Traditional Chinese: 留紹鎡
- Simplified Chinese: 留绍镃
Transcriptions
Standard Mandarin
- Hanyu Pinyin: Liú Shàozī
Southern Min
- Hokkien POJ: Lâu Siāu-chu

Liu Shaozi (Chinese: 留紹鎡) was a nephew of Liu Congxiao, a warlord late in the Chinese Five Dynasties and Ten Kingdoms Period. Under some traditional accounts, he briefly controlled Qingyuan Circuit (headquartered in modern Quanzhou, Fujian) after his uncle Liu Congxiao's death before being overthrown by the officers Chen Hongjin and Zhang Hansi.

Liu Congxiao had controlled Qingyuan as its military governor (Jiedushi) ever since then late 940s. As he was sonless, he adopted both Liu Shaozi and Liu Shaozi's older brother Liu Shaoji (Chinese: 留紹錤; Pe̍h-ōe-jī: Lâu Siāu-ki) as his sons. (Both Liu Shaoji and Liu Shaozi were biological sons of Liu Congxiao's older brother Liu Congyuan (Chinese: 留從願; Pe̍h-ōe-jī: Lâu Chiông-goān).) Liu Congxiao apparently died in 962, while being vassals of both Southern Tang and Song. Under the account given in the Xu Zizhi Tongjian (also adopted in the Spring and Autumn Annals of the Ten Kingdoms), after Liu Congxiao's death, as Liu Shaoji was then on a tributary mission sent by Liu Congxiao to the Southern Tang court, Liu Shaozi took over as acting military governor. However, not long after, Chen seized him and falsely accused him of planning to submit to Wuyue, and then delivered him to Southern Tang and supported Zhang as the new acting military governor. Under the account in the History of Song, the coup happened before Liu Congxiao's death, and therefore (implicitly) Liu Shaozi never controlled the circuit—but under Chen's biography, it gave the same account as the Xu Zizhi Tongjian (i.e., the coup was during Liu Shaozi's rule). What Liu Shaozi's fate was after being delivered to Southern Tang was not recorded in history.

== Notes and references ==
- History of Song, vol. 483.
- Spring and Autumn Annals of the Ten Kingdoms, vol. 93.
- Xu Zizhi Tongjian, vol. 2.

Government offices
Preceded by Liu Congxiao	Ruler of China (Southern Fujian) (de facto); 962	Succeeded by Zhang Hansi
