= Chengtian Temple =

Chengtian Temple (Chinese: 承天寺; pinyin: Chéngtiān Sì), may refer to:

- Pagoda of Chengtian Temple, a Chinese pagoda on the site of a previous Buddhist temple in Yinchuan, Ningxia, China.
- Chengtian Temple (Quanzhou), in Quanzhou, Fujian, China
