= Liu Congxiao =

Liu Congxiao 留從效
- Prince of Jinjiang
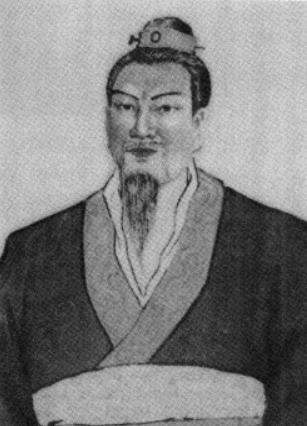
- Portrait of Liu Congxiao (Portrait painted by guessing)

Jiedushi of Qingyuan Circuit (清源軍節度使)
- Reign: 949 – 962
- Successor: Liu Shaozi (acting)
- Born: 906; Taolinchang, Nan'an County, Quanzhou (present-day Taocheng, Yongchun County)
- Died: 962 (aged 55–56); Jinjiang County, Quanzhou (present-day Licheng, Quanzhou)
Names
- Liú Cóngxiàu (留從效)
Era dates
- Adopted Southern Tang's era names: Baoda (保大): 949–957; Zhongxing (中興): 958; Jiaotai (交泰): 958; Adopted Later Zhou's era name: Xiande (顯德): 958–960; Adopted Northern Song's era name: Jianlong (建隆): 960–962
Regnal name
- Duke of E (鄂國公), later Prince of Jinjiang (晉江王)

Chinese name
- Traditional Chinese: 留從效
- Simplified Chinese: 留从效
Transcriptions
Standard Mandarin
- Hanyu Pinyin: Liú Cóngxiàu
Southern Min
- Hokkien POJ: Liû Chiông-hāu

Liu Congxiao (Chinese: 留從效; 906-962), formally the Prince of Jinjiang (Chinese: 晉江王), was a general of the Chinese Five Dynasties and Ten Kingdoms Period state Min and the first ruler of Qingyuan Circuit. After Min's fall, he initially submitted to Southern Tang (which had conquered Min), but eventually, taking advantage of Southern Tang's inability to fully control the region, took the southern part of the former Min realm under his own control, albeit in nominal submission to Southern Tang. After Southern Tang's repeated defeats by Later Zhou, he also nominally submitted to Later Zhou's successor state Song.

== Background ==
Liu Congxiao was born in 906, at the very end of the Tang dynasty. He was from Yongchun (永春, in modern Quanzhou, Fujian), which was known as Taolin (桃林) early in his lifetime. His father Liu Zhang (留璋) died in his youth, and he became known for serving his mother filially and older brother piously. He was said to be somewhat educated in literature, and was a particularly avid reader of military strategies.

== Rebellion against Zhu Wenjin and subsequent service to Yin/Min ==
As of 944, Liu Congxiao was serving as an army officer in the army of his home prefecture Quan Prefecture (泉州, in modern Quanzhou). By that time, the state that Quan had been ruled by, Min, ruled by the imperial Wang family, had been broken apart by civil war and political strife—and now was under the reign of the usurper general Zhu Wenjin (who had assassinated the emperor Wang Xi (Emperor Jingzong), with Zhu's hold on the throne being Min contested by Wang Xi's brother Wang Yanzheng, who had earlier declared himself emperor of a breakaway state of Yin.

After seizing the Min throne, Zhu sent the general Huang Shaopo (黃紹頗) to Quan Prefecture to serve as its prefect. Liu, however, was discontented, and he stated to his colleagues Wang Zhongshun (王忠順), Dong Si'an (董思安), and Zhang Hansi:

Zhu Wenjin slaughtered the Wangs and sent his confidants to take over the prefectures. We have, for generations, received the grace of the Wangs, but we stand by and serve the bandits. If the Prince of Fusha [(i.e., Wang Yanzheng, who carried the title of Prince of Fusha before declaring himself emperor)] were to capture Fu Prefecture [(福州, in modern Fuzhou, Fujian, Min's capital, then ruled by Zhu)], even death cannot be sufficient for our shame!

His colleagues agreed. In winter 944, they held a feast at Liu's house, and they gathered the soldiers below them whom they deemed reliable and strong. Liu spoke to them and stated (falsely, as it stood):

The Prince of Fusha has captured Fu Prefecture. He secretly sent us orders to attack Huang Shaopo. I see that you, gentlemen, have appearances that are not suitable for being poor for long. If you follow my words, riches and honors will come to you. If not, disaster will come.

The soldiers became roused by his words and followed him in attacking Huang. They climbed over the walls of the headquarters and killed Huang. Liu then took the prefectural government seal and presented it to Wang Jixun (王繼勳), a nephew of Wang Yanzheng who resided at Quan, asking Wang Jixun to serve as acting prefect. Liu himself took the title of "Commander of the Army Against the Bandits" (平賊統軍使). He boxed Huang's head and had the officer Chen Hongjin deliver it to Wang Yanzheng's capital Jian Prefecture (建州, in modern Nanping, Fujian). Wang Yanzheng commissioned Wang Jixun to be the prefect of Quan, and Liu, Wang Zhongshun, Dong, and Chen to be commanders of the army.

Hearing of Huang's death, Zhu sent the generals Lin Shouliang (林守諒) and Li Ting'e (李廷鍔) to attack Quan. Wang Yanzheng, hearing the news, sent the general Du Jin (杜進) to aid the Quan army. However, even before Du arrived, Liu led the Quan army and engaged Zhu's army, killing Lin in battle and capturing Li. Subsequently, Zhu was assassinated by his officer Li Renhan (李仁翰), who surrendered Fu to Wang Yanzheng, who then took the title of Emperor of Min. However, a subsequent rebellion led by Li Renda at Fu wrested that region away from Wang Yanzheng, and Wang Yanzheng's capital Jian Prefecture then came under attack by the Southern Tang general Cha Wenhui (查文徽). During the Jian siege, Wang Yanzheng ordered Quan to send a 5,000-men detachment to Jian to help defend the city; that detachment was commanded by Dong and Wang Zhongshun.

== As Southern Tang subject ==
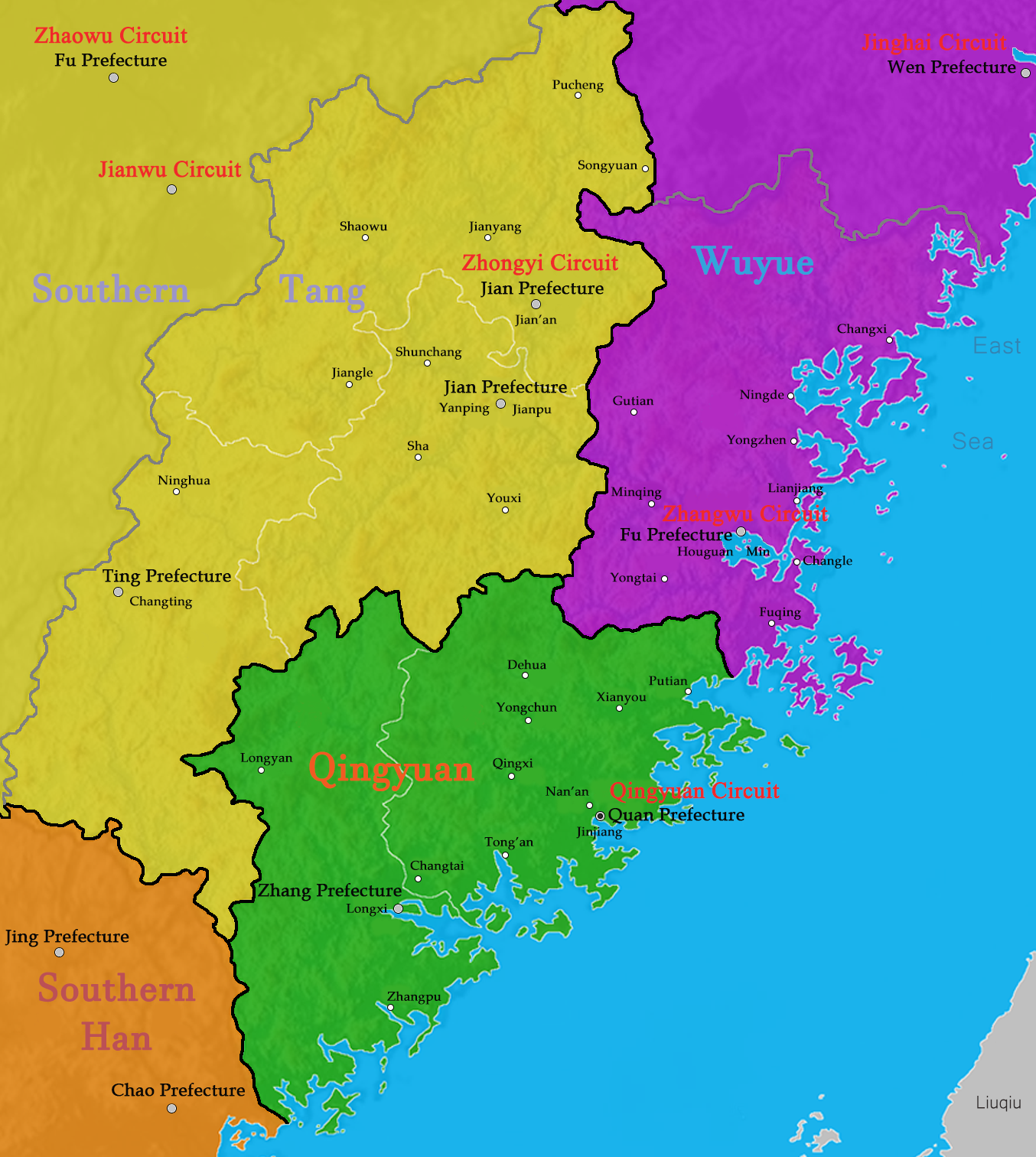
Situation of Fujian in 957

In fall 945, Jian fell to Southern Tang forces, and Wang Yanzheng surrendered. (Wang Zhongshun died in the battle, and Dong Si'an took the remnants of his army and fled back to Quan.) Initially, virtually the entire former Min domain submitted to Southern Tang's emperor Li Jing, including even Li Renda, who, however, continued to hold actual control of the Fu region. In spring 946, Liu Congxiao, alleging that, given the threats posed by Li Renda's army and that Wang Jixun was alienating the Quan soldiers by improper rewards and punishments, forced him to yield the command to Liu himself. Liu himself then attacked and defeated Li Renda in a battle, and then reported the news of the victory to Li Jing. Li Jing summoned Wang Jixun to the Southern Tang capital Jinling and commissioned Liu as the prefect of Quan, but also sent a detachment to Quan, apparently to both help defend it and to watch over Liu.

In fall 946, the Zhang Prefecture (漳州, in modern Zhangzhou, Fujian) officer Lin Zanyao (林贊堯) rebelled against Southern Tang and killed the general Chen Hui (陳誨), whom Li Jing had sent to Zhang, and Chen's monitor of the army Zhou Chengyi (周承義). Liu launched an army and expelled Lin from Zhang; he had Dong take over Zhang. Li Jing then commissioned Dong as the prefect of Zhang. (After Dong declined the position on grounds of naming taboo—because his father was named Dong Zhang (董章)—Li Jing renamed the prefecture Nan Prefecture (南州), and so Dong accepted.)

Meanwhile, Li Renda had refused to yield actual control of Fu, leading to a Southern Tang expedition against him, commanded by the general Wang Chongwen (王崇文). Li Renda sought aid from Wuyue's king Qian Hongzuo. Meanwhile, Li Jing ordered Dong and Liu to lead forces to reinforce Wang Chongwen. It was said, though, that partly as a result of that, Wang's army was bogged down and unable to siege the city effectively—as both Liu and Wang Jianfeng (王建封) were arrogant and not following Wang Chongwen's orders, while the civilian officials Chen Jue, Feng Yanlu, and Wei Cen (魏岑) were also disrupting Wang Chongwen's command structure. In spring 947, the joint forces of Li Renda and Wuyue defeated the Southern Tang siege army, which then scattered—apparently, as a result of both Liu and Wang Jianfeng not wanting to see the army regroup and take Fu—ending Southern Tang's attempt to take actual control over Fu.

Liu returned to Quan, and then held a feast for the commanding general of the Southern Tang detachment, stating to him:

Quan and Fu Prefectures are long-time enemies. To the south are the mountains, the seas, and the disease-stricken lands. Due to the years-long campaigns, agriculture and sericulture have both been abandoned, and the revenues from winter and summer taxes are only sufficient for Quan itself. How can it be permissible that we make an army stay here to help us?

Seeing that Liu was effectively wanting to chase him out, the Southern Tang general found no choice but to take his army and leave Quan. Li Jing could not think of a way to control Liu, and therefore had to be content with keeping him nominally as a subject, and granted him the honorary title of acting Taifu (太傅).

In 949, Liu's older brother Liu Congyuan (留從願), who was serving as Dong's deputy at Nan (Zhang), poisoned Dong to death and took over the control of the prefecture. Li Jing, finding no good way to deal with the situation, established a Qingyuan Circuit with its headquarters at Quan, and made Liu its military governor (Jiedushi). Not long after, he granted Liu honorary chancellor designations, and created him the Duke of E. Later, that title was upgraded to Prince of Jinjiang.

Liu was said to be frugal and hardworking as the ruler of the region. He usually wore civilian clothes, and placed his prefect uniform on at the door of his headquarters, putting it on only when he was to hear official matters and taking it off whenever unnecessary, to show humility and attentiveness to his civilian origin. Wang Yanzheng had two daughters who lived at Quan because they had married men from there, and Liu honored and treated them well. He also made sure that each year, knowledgeable individuals were selected for the imperial examinations.

In 958, during a campaign that Southern Tang's northern neighbor Later Zhou was waging against Southern Tang, Liu had his officer Cai Zhongyun (蔡仲贇), disguised as a merchant, travel to Later Zhou to submit a petition to be the subject of Later Zhou's emperor Guo Rong. However, soon the war ended (with Li Jing ceding the territory north of the Yangtze River to Later Zhou and submitting to Guo as a subject), and when Liu submitted another petition, asking to establish a liaison office at Later Zhou's capital Kaifeng and directly submitting to Later Zhou. Guo, citing the fact that Li Jing had already submitted and that Liu had been a long-time Southern Tang subject, refused, instead encouraging him to remain faithful to Li Jing.

== As dual subject to Southern Tang and Song ==
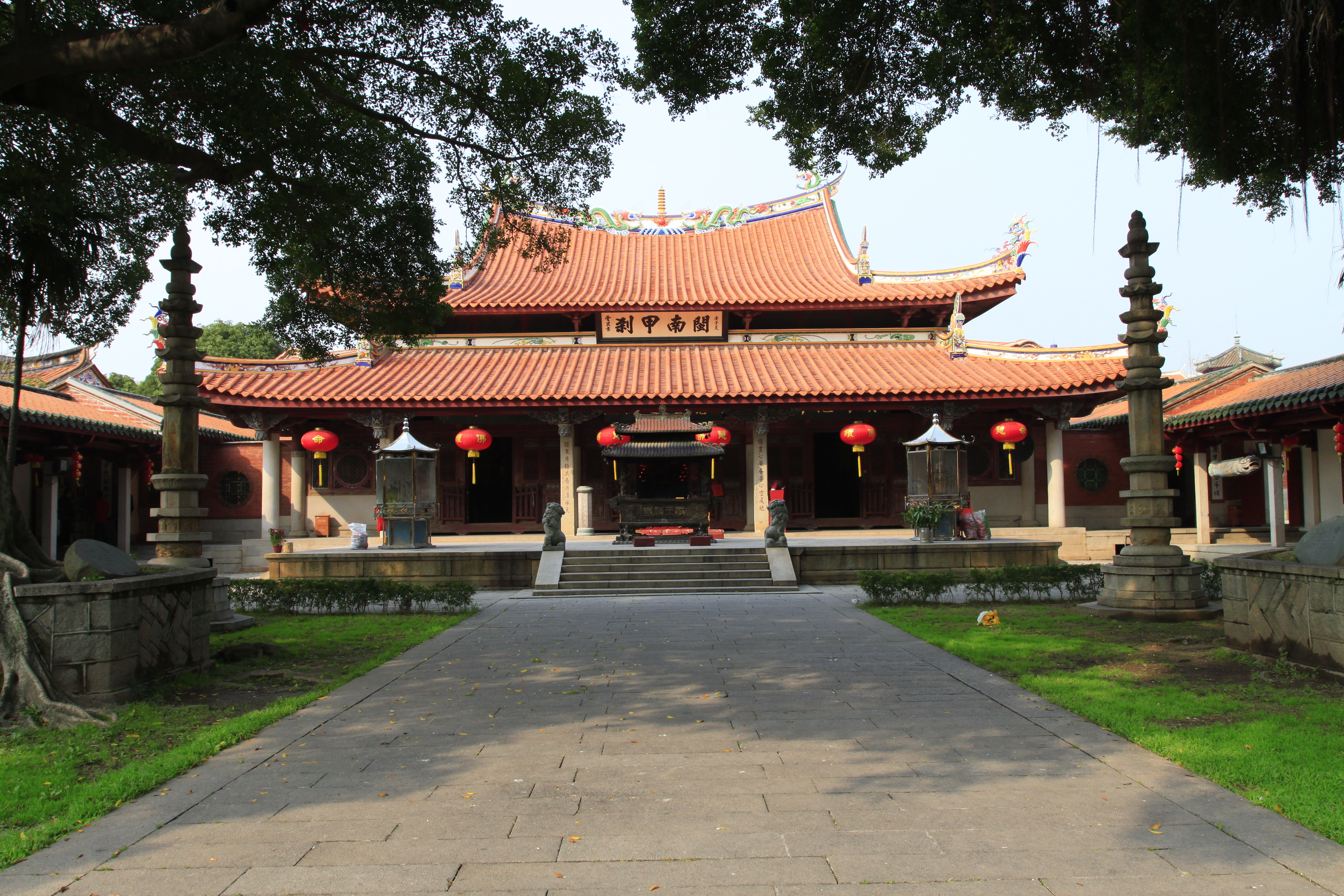
Chengtian Temple in Quanzhou, originally the South Garden of Liu Congxiao

In 960, the Later Zhou general Zhao Kuangyin seized the throne from Guo Rong's son and successor Guo Zongxun, ending Later Zhou and starting a new Song dynasty as its Emperor Taizu. Later in the year, Liu Congxiao submitted a petition to the new Song emperor, offering to be a subject, and thereafter offered tributes. Around the same time, though, Li Jing, while also offering to be a Song vassal but fearing the possibility of Song military action against Southern Tang, decided to move his capital from Jinling to Nanchang, and did so in 961. Liu, however, thought that movement of the capital was targeting him and feared a Southern Tang campaign against him, and therefore sent his nephew Liu Shaoji (留紹錤) to offer tributes to Li, while at the same time continued to send tributes to the Song emperor through Wuyue. The Song emperor sent an emissary, intending to comfort him, but before the emissary could arrive in Liu's territory, Liu had died from a tumor on his back, apparently in 962. Li Jing's son and successor Li Yu bestowed posthumous honors on him.

As Liu Congxiao was sonless, he adopted both Liu Shaoji and another nephew, Liu Shaozi (both of them biological sons of Liu Congyuan) as his sons. The Xu Zizhi Tongjian indicated that after his death, as Liu Shaoji was at the Southern Tang court, Liu Shaozi took over as acting military governor, but was soon seized by the officer Chen Hongjin, who falsely accused Liu Shaozi of wanting to submit to Wuyue and delivered Liu Shaozi to Southern Tang, while supporting Zhang Hansi as the new acting military governor. Liu Congxiao's biography in the History of Song, however, gave a different account—that the coup took place while Liu Congxiao was ill but before his death—but its biography of Chen gave the same account as the Xu Zizhi Tongjian (i.e., the coup was during Liu Shaozi's rule).

== Notes and references ==
- History of Song, vol. 483.
- Spring and Autumn Annals of the Ten Kingdoms, vol. 93.
- Zizhi Tongjian, vols. 284, 285, 286, 288, 294.
- Xu Zizhi Tongjian, vols. 1, 2.

Government offices
Preceded by Li Jing of Southern Tang	Ruler of China (Southern Fujian) (de facto); 947–962	Succeeded by Liu Shaozi
