= Empress Zhang (Wang Yanzheng's wife) =

Empress Zhang (張皇后, personal name unknown), also known as Tiande Empress (天德皇后) (after her husband Wang Yanzheng's era name of Tiande), was the last empress of the Chinese Five Dynasties and Ten Kingdoms Period state Min (and, prior to that, the empress of the branch state Yin) as the wife of Wang Yanzheng, who was the emperor of both of those states.

Very little is known about Empress Zhang. When Wang Yanzheng was the Prince of Fusha under his brother Wang Xi (Emperor Jingzong of Min), she was the Princess of Fusha. It is not known whether she bore any children for him, including whether she was the mother of his only known son, Wang Jiyi (王繼沂). In 943, when he declared himself the emperor of a new state of Yin in competition with Wang Xi, he created her empress. That was the last historical reference to her, and it is not known when she died. She is traditionally listed as one of the empresses of Min, implying that she lived at least to 945, when Wang Yanzheng reclaimed that title.

== Notes and references ==
Chinese nobility
| Preceded by None (new splinter state) | Empress of Yin; 943–945 | Succeeded by None (changed state name to Min) |
| Preceded by Empress Li | Empress of Min; 945 | Succeeded by None (dynasty destroyed) |
| Preceded by Empress Li | Empress of China (Northwestern Fujian); 943–945 | Succeeded by Empress Zhong of Southern Tang |
| Preceded by Empress Li | Empress of China (Southern Fujian); 944–945 | Succeeded by Empress Zhong of Southern Tang |
| Preceded by Empress Li | Empress of China (Northeastern/Southern Fujian); 944–945 | Succeeded by Empress Zhong of Southern Tang / Empress Feng of Later Jin |
