= Chengtian Temple (Quanzhou) =

Buddhist temple in Quanzhou, China

- 承天寺
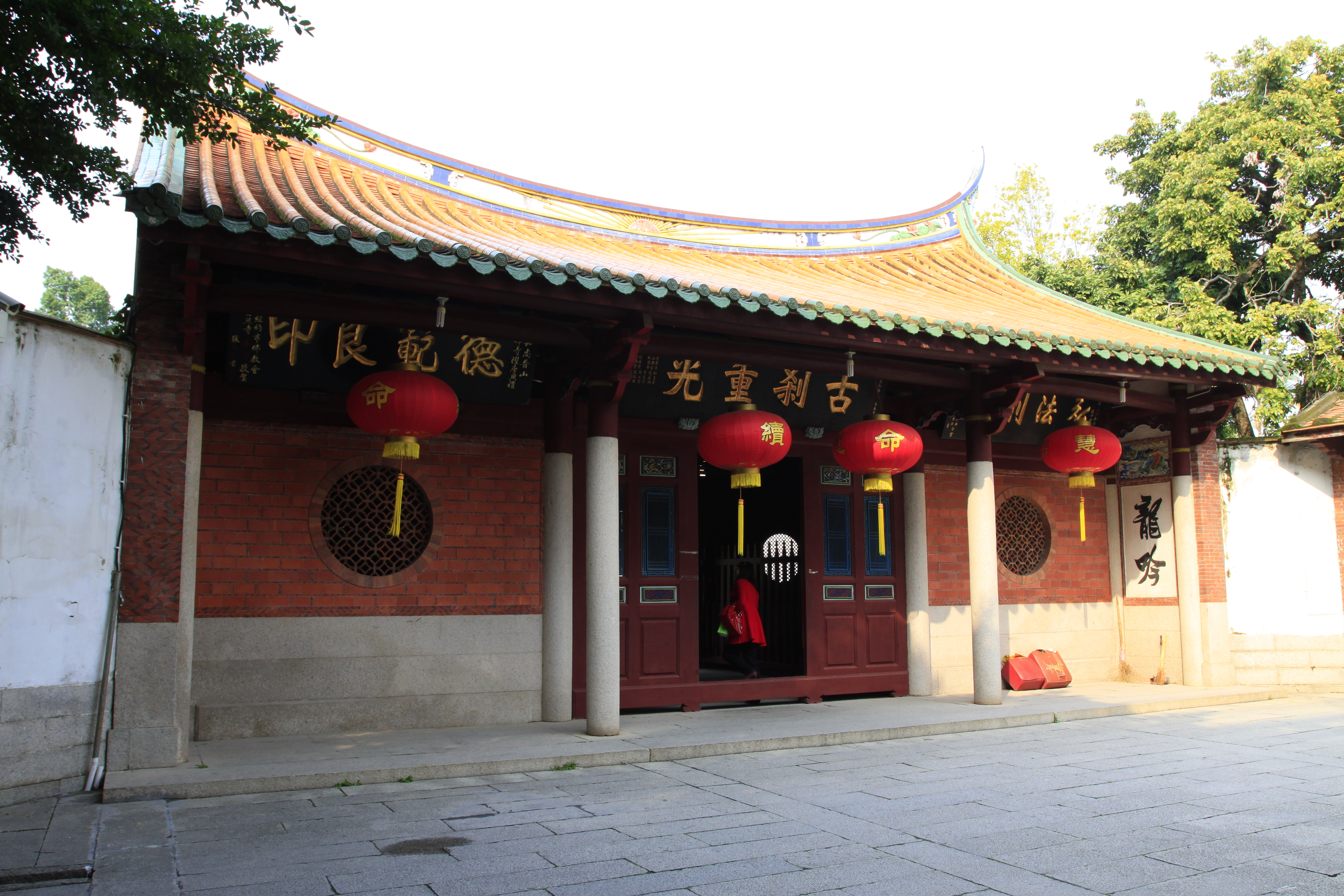
- The Hall of Four Heavenly Kings at Chengtian Temple.

- Location within Fujian

Religion
- Affiliation: Buddhism
- Deity: Pure Land Buddhism

Location
- Location: Licheng District, Quanzhou, Fujian
- Country: China
- Interactive map of Chengtian Temple
- Coordinates: 24°54′42″N 118°35′25″E

Architecture
- Style: Chinese architecture
- Established: 957–958
- Completed: 1985 (reconstruction of main halls)

Chengtian Temple (Chinese: 承天寺; pinyin: Chéngtiān Sì) is a Buddhist temple located in Licheng District, Quanzhou, Fujian, China. Chengtian Temple is considered one of the Three Great Buddhist Temples in Quanzhou, alongside Kaiyuan Temple and Chongfu Temple.

== History ==
=== Five Dynasties and Ten Kingdoms ===
The temple was first built between 957 and 958 with the name of "South Chan Temple" (南禅寺), under the Five Dynasties and Ten Kingdoms (907-960). It was the South Garden of Liu Congxiao (留从效), the Prince of Jinjiang and Jiedushi of Qingyuan Circuit, a ruler of Quanzhou in 946-962.

=== Song dynasty ===
In 1007, in the reign of Emperor Zhenzong of the Song dynasty (960–1279), the emperor inscribed and honored the name "Chengtian Temple" (承天寺).

=== Republic of China ===
In 1947, Chan master Guangqin (广钦) went to Taiwan to disseminate Buddhism and deliver Buddhist precepts, where he erected the Miaotong Temple, Jinhai Chan Temple, Hengguang Chan Temple, and Guangzhao Temple.

=== People's Republic of China ===
In 1966, Mao Zedong launched the ten-year disastrous Cultural Revolution, the red guards ruthlessly attacked the temple, the Hall of Maitreya, Dharma Hall, Bell tower, Drum tower, corridor, hallway, pavilions, and pagodas were destroyed. They were then converted into residential buildings and faculty.

After the 3rd Plenary Session of the 11th Central Committee of the Chinese Communist Party, the policy of greater religious freedom was implemented. Chan master Hongchuan (宏船) returned to Quanzhou and started to restore Chengtian Temple. Renovations and rebuilding to the main buildings (including Mahavira Hall, Dharma Hall, Hall of Maitreya) began in 1985 and were completed in October 1990. The then President of Buddhist Association of China, Upāsaka Zhao Puchu attended the consecration ceremony.

Chengtian Temple was inscribed to the Quanzhou Municipal Cultural Heritage List by the Quanzhou Municipal Government in June 1961. The Stone Dhvaja of Chengtian Temple was listed among the sixth group of Fujian Provincial Historical and Cultural Sites by the Fujian Provincial Government on May 11, 2005.

== Architecture ==
The entire temple faces south with the Four Heavenly Kings Hall, Hall of Maitreya, Free Life Pond, Mahavira Hall, Dharma Hall, Hall of Manjushri along the central axis of the complex. On both sides are the Bell tower, Drum tower, and corridor.

=== Mahavira Hall ===
The Mahavira Hall is five rooms wide with double-eaves gable and hip roofs. A 10th-century bronze statue of Sakyamuni from Ancient India is enshrined in the center of the hall.

=== Stone Dhvaja ===
The 13-storey and 7-metre (23 ft) tall Stone Dhvaja stands in front of the Hall of Manjushri. It was carved in the Northern Song dynasty (960–1127). It is composed of a sumeru throne, a body and a root crown. The body was engraved patterns of various flying phoenixes, lotuses, Hercules, monsters, etc.

== Gallery ==
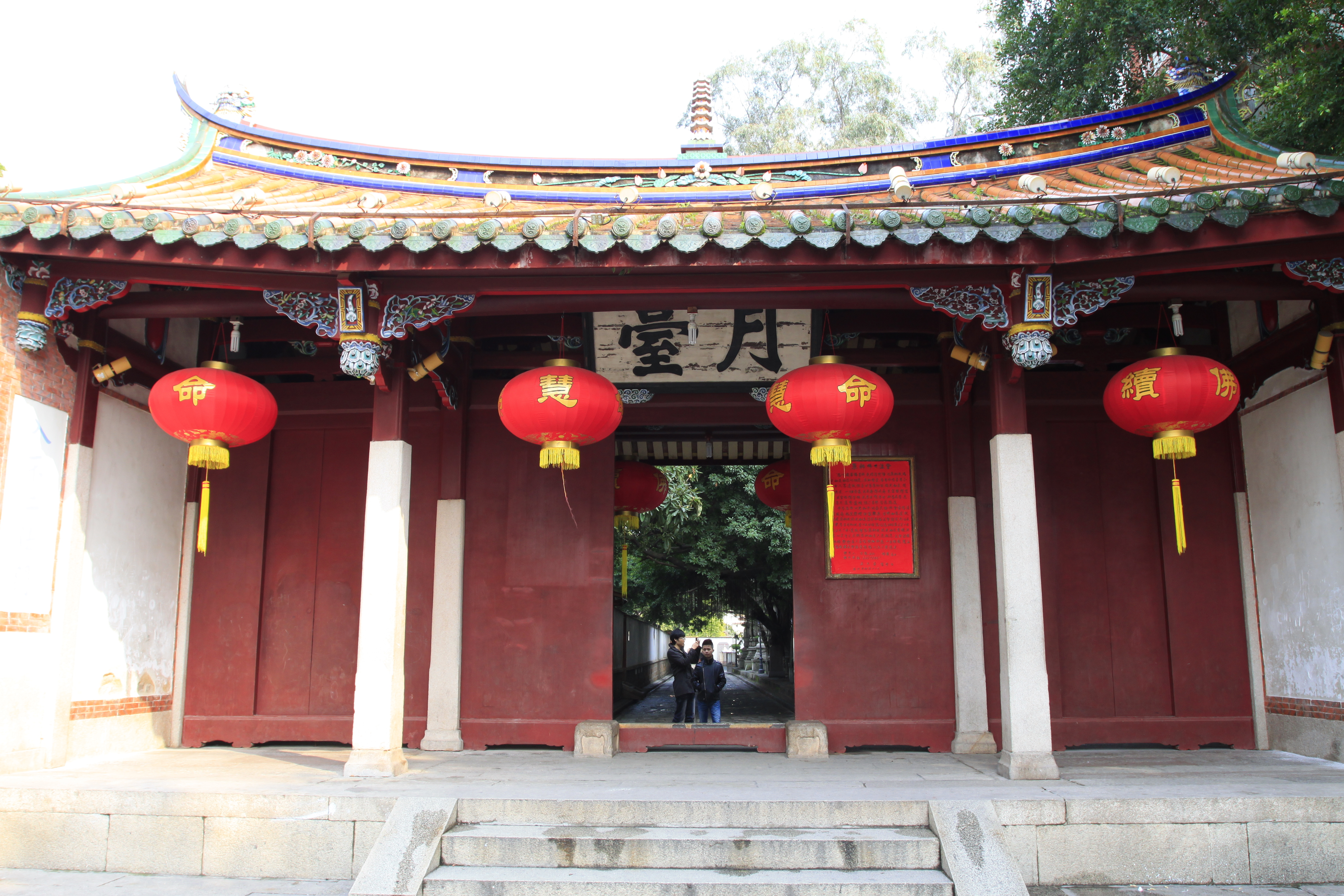
Terrace.

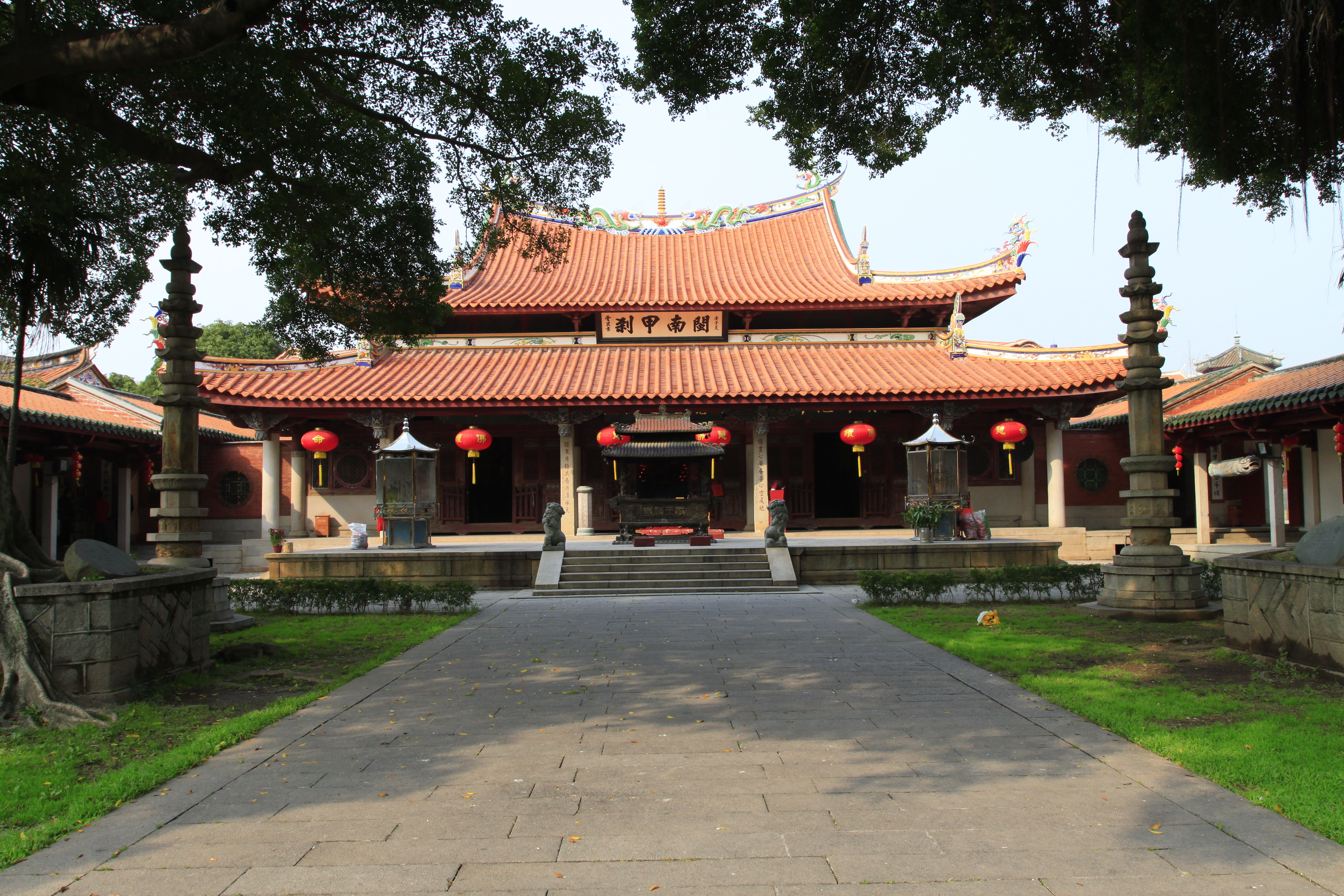
Mahavira Hall.

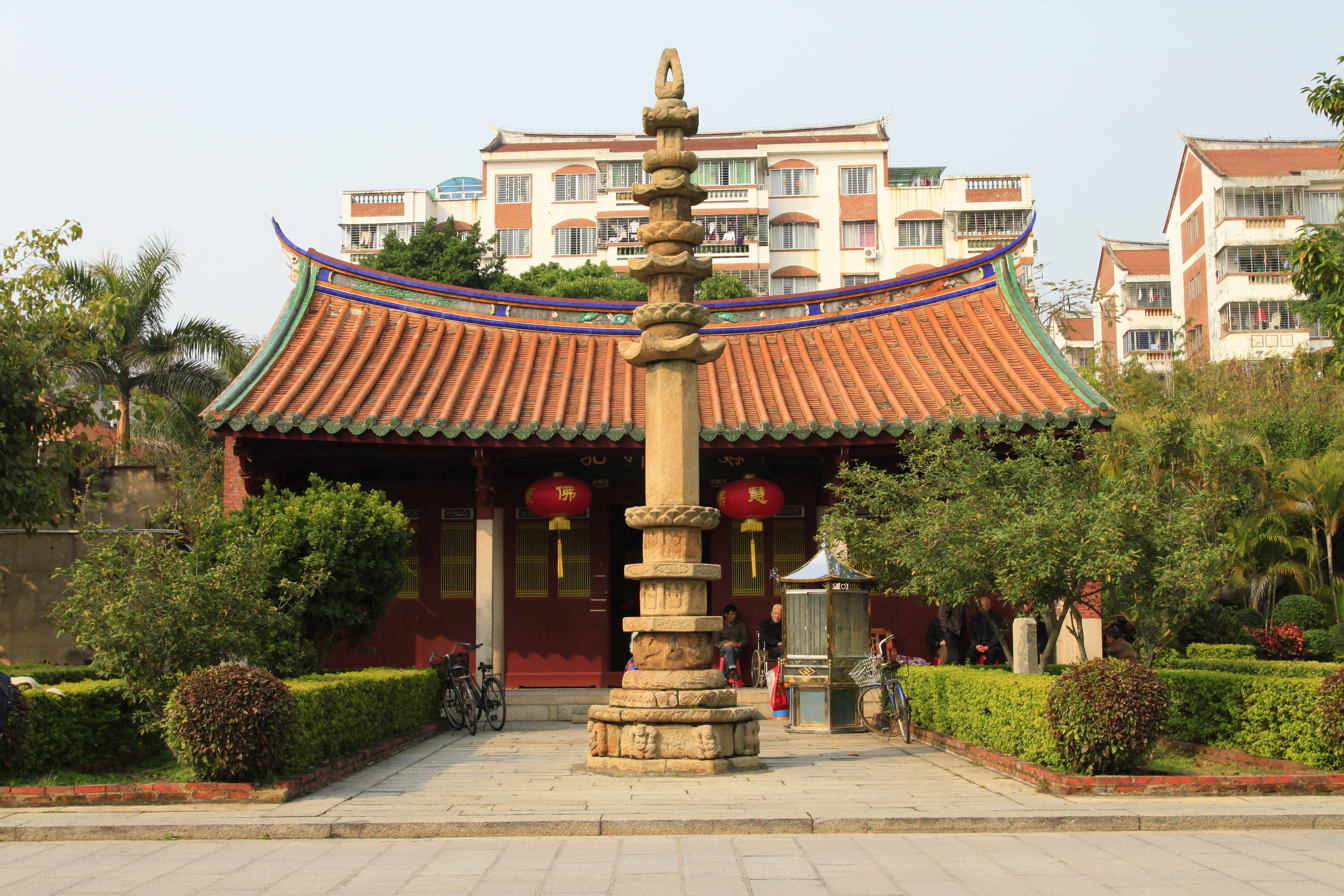
Stone Dhvaja stands in front of the Hall of Manjushri.
