= Yang Sigong =

Yang Sigong (楊思恭) (died 945), nicknamed Skinner Yang (楊剝皮, Yang Baopi), was an official of the Chinese Five Dynasties and Ten Kingdoms Period state Min and Min's branch state Yin. He became a trusted official during the reign of Yin's only emperor (later Min's emperor as well) Wang Yanzheng and became known for harsh taxes against the people, leading to the people turning against Wang Yanzheng and welcoming an invading Southern Tang army, leading to Min's fall.

== Service under Wang Yanzheng ==
Little is recorded in historical accounts about Yang Sigong's background, including when he was born, other than that he was from Jianyang (建陽, in modern Nanping, Fujian). At some point, during the time that Wang Yanzheng carried the titles of Prince of Fusha as a Min imperial prince and military governor (Jiedushi) of Zhenwu Circuit (鎮武, headquartered at Jian Prefecture (建州), in modern Nanping), i.e., in or after 941, Yang Sigong served as his circuit surveyor (although it was possible that Yang had served on his staff previously).

In 943, Wang Yanzheng, who had been locked in a civil war against his brother Wang Xi the Emperor of Min (Emperor Jingzong), declared himself the emperor of a new state of Yin. He initially commissioned Yang as the minister of defense (兵部尚書, Bingbu Shangshu), and then gave him the titles of Pushe (僕射) and Lu Junguo Shi (錄軍國事), effectively making him a chancellor (albeit with a more provisional designation than his chancellor colleague Pan Chengyou, who received a more formal chancellor designation of Tong Zhongshu Menxia Pingzhangshi (同中書門下平章事)). It was said that Yang received Wang Yanzheng's favors by being good at extracting revenues. He not only raised taxes on farmland, hills, and ponds, but also taxed such things as fish, salt, vegetables, and fruits. This led to the people of Yin referring to him as "Skinner Yang." When Pan wrote a list of 10 areas of governance that he felt that Wang should remedy, Yang's oppressive taxes was one of Pan's items. Wang, instead, stripped Pan of his commission and forced him to retire.

By 945, Wang was (at least in name) ruler of all of the Min domain and had changed his title to Emperor of Min. However, he was facing an attack by Southern Tang from the northwest, commanded by the Southern Tang general Cha Wenhui (查文徽). Wang sent Yang Sigong and Chen Wang to resist. Chen initially took a defensive posture and set up his defense on a river, and the Southern Tang army did not dare to attack. However, Yang, stating that it was Wang Yanzheng's order, insisted that Chen attack. Chen was forced to attack the Southern Tang army, and fell into a trap set by the Southern Tang general Zu Quan'en (祖全恩). Chen was killed, and Yang was forced to flee back to Jian. It was said that the people of Jian, tired of the warfare among the Wang clan members and the heavy-handed rule imposed by Yang, were welcoming the Southern Tang army and opening roads for them, and Cha then put Jian under siege.

== Death ==
In fall 945, the Southern Tang army breached Jian's defense, and Wang Yanzheng surrendered. Southern Tang's emperor Li Jing gave him a general title. However, to placate the people of Jian, he executed Yang Sigong, apparently at the Southern Tang capital Jinling.

== Notes and references ==
- Spring and Autumn Annals of the Ten Kingdoms, vol. 98.
- Zizhi Tongjian, vols. 283, 284, 285.
