= Zhuo Yanming =

Zhúo Yánmíng (卓巖明)
- Emperor

Emperor
- Reign: April 14, 945 – July 4, 945
- Predecessor: Wang Yanzheng
- Successor: Li Jing / Shi Chonggui
- Born: Probably Putian
- Died: July 4, 945; Fuzhou
Names
- Zhúo Yánmíng (卓巖明)
Era name and dates
- None (used Later Jin's Tianfu era name): Not applicable
- Religion: Buddhism

Zhuo Yanming (卓巖明) (died July 4, 945), né Zhuo Yansi (卓偃巳), dharma name Timing (體明), was a Buddhist monk in the late years of the Chinese Five Dynasties and Ten Kingdoms Period Min state. After the Min army officer Li Renda rebelled against Min's last emperor Wang Yanzheng and took over control of Fu Prefecture (福州, in modern Fuzhou, Fujian), he proclaimed Zhuo Yanming, who was respected by the people, emperor, but shortly after assassinated Zhuo and directly took control.

== Background ==
It is not known when Zhuo Yanming, who was born with the name of Zhuo Yansi, was born, but it is known that he was from Putian (莆田, in modern Putian, Fujian). At some point, he took tonsure and became a Buddhist monk with the dharma name of Timing — at either Shenguang Temple (神光寺) (per the Spring and Autumn Annals of the Ten Kingdoms) or Xuefeng Temple (雪峰寺) (per the Zizhi Tongjian), near the Min traditional capital Fu Prefecture. While being a monk, he became respected by the populace.

In 945, Li Renda, leading a revolt against the Min emperor Wang Yanzheng (whose capital was at that point at Jian Prefecture (建州, in modern Nanping, Fujian), not at Fu), killed Wang Yanzheng's nephew Wang Jichang, whom he had left in command at Fu, and Wang Jichang's assistant general Wu Chengyi (吳成義), seizing control of Fu. Li considered formally taking over himself but believed that the people might not sufficiently be in agreement with him. Instead, knowing that the people respected Timing, he proclaimed, "This monk has multiple pupils, and has arms reaching below his knees. These are signs of a true Son of Heaven." He proclaimed Timing emperor and put imperial robes on him — yet simultaneously, having the regime use the era name of Later Jin and sending emissaries to Later Jin to pledge loyalty.

== Brief reign ==
Upon assuming the throne, Timing took back his surname of Zhuo and took a new name of Yanming. He also welcomed his father from Putian and honored his father as Taishang Huang (retired emperor).

Wang Yanzheng immediately launched an army commanded by the general Zhang Hanzhen (張漢真) against Zhuo's regime, along with supplements from Zhang (漳州, in modern Zhangzhou, Fujian) and Quan (泉州, in modern Quanzhou, Fujian) Prefectures, which were loyal to him. It was said that Zhuo had no strategies to speak of other than trying to employ magic within the palace. Zhang Hanzhen, however, was defeated by Zhuo's general Huang Renfeng (黃仁諷), captured, and executed.

Upon defeating Zhang, Li Renda took over command of the imperial guards, and shortly after had others accuse Huang and Chen Jixun (陳繼珣) of treason and killed them, consolidating the military command in his hands. Not long after, he held a grand review of the troops and had Zhuo attend to view them. At the review, he had a soldier assassinate Zhuo. Zhuo's father was also put to death.

== Notes and references ==
- Spring and Autumn Annals of the Ten Kingdoms, vol. 98.
- Zizhi Tongjian, vol. 284.

Government offices
Preceded by Wang Yanzheng of Min	Emperor of China (Northeastern Fujian) (de jure); 945	Succeeded by Li Jing of Southern Tang / Shi Chonggui of Later Jin
