= Wang Yanzheng =

Emperor of Yin (943–945) and Min (945)

Tiande Emperor of Min 閩天德帝
- Emperor of Yin; Emperor of Min
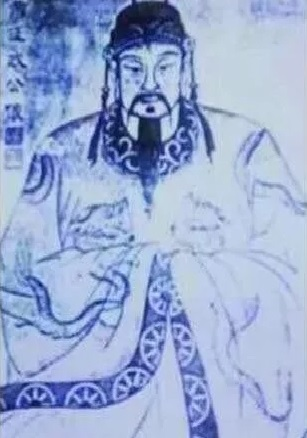

Emperor of Min
- Reign: February or March 945 – October 2, 945
- Predecessor: Zhu Wenjin (as King of Min)
- Successor: None

Emperor of Yin
- Reign: March or April 943 – February or March 945
- Predecessor: None
- Successor: Crowned as the Emperor of Min
- Died: 951? Nanjing?
- Wife: Empress Zhang
- Issue: Wang Jiyi (王繼沂); Two daughters
Names
- Wáng Yánzhèng (王延政)
Era name and dates
- Tiāndé (天德): 943 – October 2, 945
Posthumous name
- Prince Gongyi of Fu (福恭懿王)
- House: Wang
- Dynasty: Yin (943–945); Min (945)
- Father: Wang Shenzhi

Wang Yanzheng (Chinese: 王延政) (died 951?), also known by his era name as the Tiande Emperor (天德帝), posthumous name Prince Gongyi of Fu (福恭懿王), was the founder and only emperor of Yin, who later became the last monarch of Min, during the Five Dynasties and Ten Kingdoms period of China.

In 943, he, then in civil war with his brother Wang Yanxi (Emperor Jingzong), declared himself emperor of a new Yin dynasty at his power base at Jian Prefecture (建州, in modern Nanping, Fujian), but after Wang Yanxi was killed by the general Zhu Wenjin, who was himself assassinated thereafter, Wang Yanzheng claimed the title of Emperor of Min, thereby putting an end to the state of Yin. His reign would last less than three years overall, though, as Min's northwestern neighbor Southern Tang bore down militarily on him and forced his surrender, thus ending Min.

== Background ==
It is not known when Wang Yanzheng was born. His father was Min's first ruler, Wang Shenzhi (Prince Zhongyi), but his mother's identity is not recorded in history. Further, while his older brother Wang Yanxi (the third among his brothers to rule Min) was said to be Wang Shenzhi's 28th son, Wang Yanzheng's birth rank is also not recorded in history. (However, as Wang Yanzheng was not mentioned on the tombstone of Wang Shenzhi's wife Lady Ren Neiming, he was likely born after Lady Ren's death in 918.)

The first reference to Wang Yanzheng in historical sources was in 931, when another older brother, Wang Yanjun, then ruling but carrying only the title of Prince of Min as a vassal of Later Tang, had defeated and executed their adoptive brother, Wang Yanbing, who had controlled the Jian Prefecture region and had tried to seize control of the Min state from Wang Yanjun. After Wang Yanbing's death, Wang Yanjun sent Wang Yanzheng to Jian to try to comfort the people, and he later commissioned Wang Yanzheng as the prefect of Jian, a post that Wang Yanzheng then appeared to remain at for the next several years.

== Service under and civil war with Wang Xi ==
In 939, Wang Yanxi became Min's ruler (and changed his name to Wang Xi) after the prior emperor of Min, their nephew Wang Chang, had been overthrown and killed. It was said that after taking the throne (using, at that time, the title of king), Wang Xi became arrogant and cruel, taking grudges out on people, including his clan members. Wang Yanzheng wrote several letters to him urging him to change his behavior. Wang Xi did not listen, and wrote back angry letters to rebuke Wang Yanzheng. He also sent his close associate Ye Qiao (鄴翹) to monitor Wang Yanzheng's army, and the officer Du Hanchong (杜漢崇) to monitor the nearby Nanzhen Base (南鎮, in modern Ningde, Fujian). Ye and Du submitted numerous reports alleging misdeeds by Wang Yanzheng, exacerbating the suspicions between the brothers. One day, Wang Yanzheng and Ye were discussing matters of governance, and it escalated into an argument. Ye stated, "Are you rebelling, Lord?" Wang Yanzheng, in anger, tried to arrest and kill Ye. Ye fled to Nanzhen. Wang Yanzheng then attacked Nanzhen and defeated the central government-controlled army there. Ye and Du fled back to Min's capital Fu Prefecture (福州, in modern Fuzhou, Fujian). Wang Yanzheng then also defeated the other central government-controlled forces in the region.

In response, Wang Xi sent his generals Pan Shikui (潘師逵) and Wu Xingzhen (吳行真) to attack Wang Yanzheng with 40,000 men. Wang Yanzheng sought aid from Qian Yuanguan, the king of Min's northern neighbor Wuyue. Qian sent the general Yang Renquan with 40,000 men to aid Wang Yanzheng. Before Yang could arrive, though, Wang Yanzheng had already defeated the Min central government army, killing Pan and forcing Wu to flee. Wang Yanzheng also used the opportunity to also capture the cities of Yongping (永平) and Shunchang (順昌) (both in modern Nanping). When Yang's army arrived, Wang Yanzheng tried to send him away by offering beef and wine to the troops, but Yang refused, instead setting his camp outside the city, posturing to get ready to besiege it. In fear, Wang Yanzheng wrote Wang Xi, requesting aid. Wang Xi sent their nephew Wang Jiye (王繼業) with an army to aid him, and also wrote Qian to rebuke him and sent another army to cut off the Wuyue army's food supply route. Once the Wuyue army's food supply ran out, Wang Yanzheng attacked, defeating it. Yang then withdrew. Subsequently, Li Jing, the emperor of Min's northwestern neighbor Southern Tang, sent the emissary Shang Quangong (尚全恭) to both Wang Xi and Wang Yanzheng, urging them to make peace with each other. With Li Jing's moderation, Wang Yanzheng sent officers and female servants to submit a statement of oath and an incense censer to Wang Xi. Subsequently, Wang Yanzheng's emissaries and Wang Xi swore an oath at their father Wang Shenzhi's tomb. However, despite this oath, the suspicions between the brothers remained.

In 941, Wang Yanzheng fortified the defenses around Jian Prefecture, and he also requested Wang Xi make him the military governor of Weiwu Circuit (威武, traditionally headquartered at Fu, but Wang Yanzheng thus was proposing to have its capital moved to Jian). Wang Xi, citing the fact that Weiwu's capital was traditionally at Fu, declined, but created a new circuit with its capital at Jian, making Wang Yanzheng its military governor. However, the name that Wang Xi decreed — Zhen'an (鎮安, "settled peace") — was not to Wang Yanzheng's liking, so Wang Yanzheng renamed it Zhenwu (鎮武, "settled military"). Wang Xi also created him the Prince of Fusha — a title that the people of Min would subsequently refer to him as, even after he claimed imperial title. Meanwhile, Wang Xi, suspecting that another brother, Wang Yanxi (王延喜, note different character than Wang Xi himself) the Prefect of Ting Prefecture (汀州, in modern Longyan, Fujian), was allying with Wang Yanzheng, sent the general Xu Renqin (許仁欽) to Ting, seizing Wang Yanxi and returning him to Fu. Also suspecting Wang Jiye, who was then serving as the prefect of Quan Prefecture (泉州, in modern Quanzhou, Fujian), as Wang Yanzheng had written Wang Jiye, Wang Xi also recalled Wang Jiye and then ordered him to commit suicide.

Later in 941, Wang Xi claimed imperial title and resumed his campaign against Wang Yanzheng, but the battles were indecisive. Historical accounts described the scene of the battlefields between Fu and Jian as being covered with human bones. Wang Yanzheng's secretary Pan Chengyou suggested that he seek peace, but Wang Yanzheng refused. Shortly after, he claimed the title of Generalissimo (兵馬元帥, Bingma Yuanshuai).

In 942, Wang Yanzheng attacked Ting and put it under siege. Wang Xi launched armies from Quan and Zhang (漳州, in modern Zhangzhou, Fujian) to aid Ting, while launching another army, commanded by the generals Lin Shouliang (林守亮), Huang Jingzhong (黃敬忠), and Huang Shaopo (黃少頗), to try to attack Jian in Wang Yanzheng's absence. Wang Yanzheng's attacks on Ting were unsuccessful, but his generals Bao Hongshi (包弘實) and Chen Wang (陳望) engaged and killed Huang Jingzhong. Lin and Huang Shaopo fled back to Fu. Wang Xi subsequently sent a personally-written edict, gold vessels, money, and 640 commissions for Wang Yanzheng's subordinates, to Wang Yanzheng, seeking peace. Wang Yanzheng refused to receive the items.

== As Emperor of Yin ==
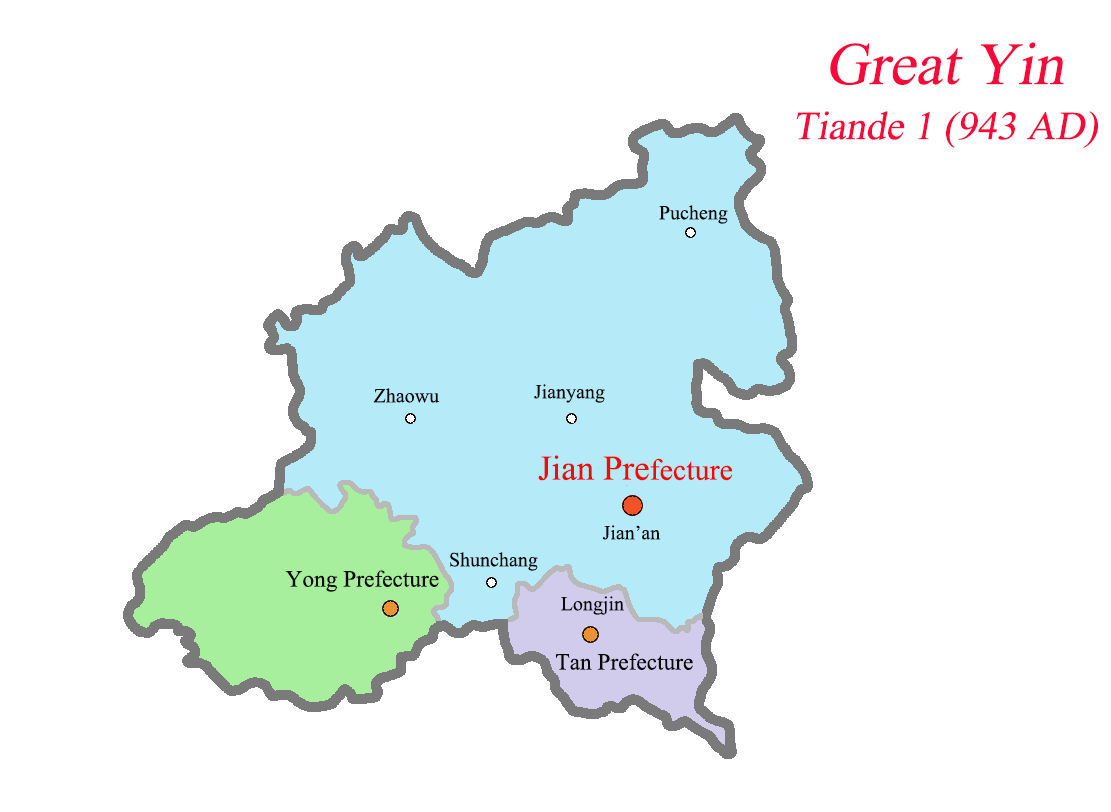
Map of Yin, 943

In 943, Wang Yanzheng declared himself emperor of a new state of Yin. He created his wife Lady Zhang as empress, and commissioned Pan Chengyou and Yang Sigong as his chancellors. However, it was said that while he wore the red robe of an emperor, in his embassies to neighboring states and receiving such embassies from them, he still used the ceremony only of a military governor. Meanwhile, it was said that because the state is small but had large military expenditures, Yang received his favor by imposing heavy taxes on the people, on real property as well as even fish, salt, vegetables, and fruits, such that the resentful people referred to Yang as "Yang the Skinner."

In summer 943, Chen Wang attacked Fu Prefecture and advanced into the city through its west gate, but was eventually repelled and forced to withdraw. Shortly later, Pan submitted a petition, pointing out 10 things that, in Pan's opinion, were problematic with Wang Yanzheng's rule of the Yin state:

1. His battles against his brother Wang Xi.
2. His heavy taxation and conscription of labor.
3. His conscription of soldiers and giving them heavy war burdens.
4. His allowing Yang's heavy taxations, causing resentment towards the emperor, but no other official dared to speak against Yang.
5. His establishment of many prefectures and counties in his small state, leading to administrative waste.
6. His concentrating on capturing Ting and thus not being concerned about possible attacks by Southern Tang and Wuyue.
7. His seizure of assets from wealthy merchants, his selling offices to the rich, and the result that the poor were the only ones punished.
8. His taxation of fruits, vegetables, fish, and rice at various river fords, gaining little in tax revenues and causing much resentment.
9. His not sending emissaries to Southern Tang and Wuyue.
10. His building of palaces and overexpenditures on decorating them.

In anger, Wang Yanzheng stripped Pan of his titles and forced him to retire to his mansion.

In 944, Yin minted large iron coins, with each large coin having the value of 100 small coins.

Shortly later, Li Jing sent letters to both Wang Xi and Wang Yanzheng, rebuking them for attacking each other. Wang Xi wrote back, citing comparisons to the Duke of Zhou's killing of his rebellious brothers, the Lords of Guan and Cai, and to Emperor Taizong of Tang's killing of his brothers Li Jiancheng and Li Yuanji. Wang Yanzheng, however, wrote back in a more disrespectful manner, instead rebuking Li Jing's father Li Bian's usurpation of the throne from Southern Tang's predecessor state Wu. Li Jing, in anger, cut off relationships with Yin.

Later in 944, Wang Xi was assassinated by his generals Zhu Wenjin and Lian Chongyu. Lian supported Zhu to be the new emperor of Min, and slaughtered the Wang clan members remaining at Fu Prefecture. Hearing this, Wang Yanzheng sent the general Wu Chengyi (吳成義) to attack Zhu, but was unsuccessful at that time. Shortly after, however, the Quan Prefecture officers Liu Congxiao, Wang Zhongshun (王忠順), Dong Si'an (董思安), and Zhang Hansi, assassinated Huang Shaopo, whom Zhu commissioned as Quan's prefect, and submitted to Yin, supporting Wang Yanzheng's nephew Wang Jixun (王繼勳) as acting prefect. The Zhang Prefecture officer Cheng Mo (程謨) then assassinated the Zhu-commissioned prefect of Zhang, Cheng Wenwei (程文緯), as well, and supported another nephew of Wang Yanzheng's, Wang Jicheng (王繼成), as acting prefect. Ting's prefect Xu Wenzhen (許文稹) did so shortly after as well.

Zhu, faced with these prefectures' turning against him, sent the generals Lin Shouliang (林守諒) and Li Ting'e (李廷鍔) to attack Quan, and Wang Yanzheng sent the general Du Jin (杜進) to aid Liu in defending Quan. Liu engaged Lin and Li, defeating Lin and capturing Li. Wang Yanzheng then sent Wu to attack Fu again, and Zhu sought aid from Wuyue. Meanwhile, the Southern Tang general Cha Wenhui (查文徽) launched an attack on Jian, but when he heard that Zhang, Quan, and Ting had all submitted to Yin, he withdrew to Jianyang (建陽, in modern Nanping).

Hearing of the Southern Tang attack, though, Wu decided to use it to trick the people of Fu — declaring to them that, indeed, Southern Tang was aiding Yin in attacking the rebellious Zhu. Zhu tried to sue for peace by sending his chancellor Li Guangzhun (李光准) to surrender the Min imperial seal to Wang Yanzheng. However, before any further peace overtures could be made, the Fu officer Lin Renhan (林仁翰) led an uprising and killed both Lian and Zhu. He then opened the city gates to welcome Wu in, and also offered Lian's and Zhu's heads to Wang Yanzheng.

== As Emperor of Min ==
The Min officials submitted petitions to Wang Yanzheng, urging him to change the name of the state back to Min and to return the capital to Fu. Wang accepted the first proposal and claimed the title of Emperor of Min, but declined the second, due to the impending Southern Tang attack. Rather, he made Fu the southern capital and sent his nephew Wang Jichang to defend it, while summoning the remaining imperial guards from Fu.

Meanwhile, at Cha Wenhui's request, Li Jing sent additional troops to reinforce his army to again prepare to attack Jian. Wang sent Yang Sigong and Chen Wang to resist. Chen initially took a defensive posture and set up his defense on a river, and the Southern Tang army did not dare to attack. However, Yang, stating that it was Wang Yanzheng's order, insisted that Chen attack. Chen was forced to attack the Southern Tang army, and fell into a trap set by the Southern Tang general Zu Quan'en (祖全恩). Chen was killed, and Yang was forced to flee back to Jian. Hearing of this, Wang Yanzheng panicked, summoned additional troops from Quan (commanded by Dong Si'an and Wang Zhongshun) to reinforce Jian's defenses, and prepared for a siege. It was said that the people of Jian, tired of the warfare among the Wang clan members and the heavy-handed rule imposed by Yang, were welcoming the Southern Tang army and opening roads for them.

At the same time, though, two officers at Fu, Li Renda and Chen Jixun (陳繼珣), both of whom had turned against Wang Yanzheng before, persuaded the general Huang Renfeng (黃仁諷) into rising against Wang Yanzheng. They assassinated Wang Jichang and Wu Chengyi, and declared the Buddhist monk Zhuo Yanming to be emperor. Wang Yanzheng sent the general Zhang Hanzhen (張漢真) to attack Zhuo's new regime, and, suspecting the loyalty of the Fu troops at Jian at that time, slaughtered them and used their flesh for food. He also sent a petition offering to submit as a vassal to Wuyue, seeking its aid. (Meanwhile, Li Renda first falsely accused Huang and Chen of preparing to rebel against Zhuo and had them killed, and then assassinated Zhuo himself, taking power and claiming the title of acting military governor of Weiwu, in nominal submission to both Southern Tang and Later Jin.)

By fall 945, Jian was in a desperate situation, and eventually, the city fell. Wang Yanzheng surrendered, while Wang Zhongshun died in the battle and Dong took his army and fled back to Quan.

== As Southern Tang subject ==
Wang Yanzheng was delivered back to the Southern Tang capital Jinling. Li Jing gave him a general title, while executing Yang Sigong per the popular sentiment of the people of Jian. He also commissioned his general Wang Chongwen (王崇文) to be the military governor of a newly established Yong'an Circuit (永安), headquartered at Jian, to rule over the former Min territory that Wang Yanzheng still held, including Ting, Quan, and Zhang Prefectures, each of which submitted to Southern Tang (for the time being).

In 947, Li commissioned Wang Yanzheng to be the military governor of Anhua Circuit (安化, headquartered in modern Shangrao, Jiangxi). He also created Wang the Prince of Poyang.

In 951, Li commissioned Wang to be the military governor of Shannan West Circuit (山南西道, headquartered in modern Hanzhong, Shaanxi) — a completely honorary title as Shannan West was then under the rule of Later Shu. He also created Wang the Prince of Guangshan. It was said that Wang died not long after, implying that it was that year. He was posthumously created the Prince of Fu, and given the posthumous name of Gongyi (恭懿, "respectful and benevolent").

== Notes and references ==
- History of the Five Dynasties, vol. 134.
- New History of the Five Dynasties, vol. 68.
- Spring and Autumn Annals of the Ten Kingdoms, vol. 92.
- Zizhi Tongjian, vols. 277, 282, 283, 284, 285, 287, 290.

Chinese nobility
Preceded by None (new splinter state)	Emperor of Yin; 943–945	Succeeded by None (changed state name to Min)
Preceded by Wang Yanxi (Emperor Jingzong)	Emperor of China (Northwestern Fujian) (de jure); 943–945	Succeeded by Li Jing of Southern Tang
Preceded by Wang Yanxi (Emperor Jingzong)	Ruler of China (Northwestern Fujian) (de facto); 940–945	Succeeded by Li Jing of Southern Tang
Preceded by Zhu Wenjin	Emperor of China (Southern Fujian); 944–945	Succeeded by Li Jing of Southern Tang
Preceded by Zhu Wenjin	Emperor of China (Northeastern Fujian) (de jure); 945	Succeeded by Zhuo Yanming
Preceded by Zhu Wenjin	Ruler of China (Northeastern Fujian) (de facto); 945	Succeeded by Li Renda
Preceded by Zhu Wenjin	Emperor of Min; 945	Succeeded by None (dynasty destroyed)
