= Wang Jichang =

Wang Jichang (王繼昌) (died 945) was a general and chancellor of the Chinese Five Dynasties and Ten Kingdoms Period state Min. He was a nephew of its last emperor Wang Yanzheng, and briefly served as chancellor and general during Wang Yanzheng's reign.

== Background ==
It is not known when or where Wang Jichang was born. It is known, however, that he was a nephew of Wang Yanzheng — and, therefore, likely a grandson of Min's founding prince Wang Shenzhi (Prince Zhongyi) (although conceivably the grandson of one of Wang Shenzhi's brothers, Wang Chao or Wang Shengui (王審邽)). His parents' identity were not otherwise given in traditional histories.

== During Wang Yanzheng's Reign ==
In 943, Wang Yanzheng, then in civil war against his brother, then-reigning Min emperor Wang Xi (Emperor Jingzong), declared himself the emperor of a new branch state Yin at his stronghold of Jian Prefecture (建州, in modern Nanping, Fujian). He made Wang Jichang Menxia Shilang (門下侍郎) and chancellor with the designation Tong Zhongshu Menxia Pingzhangshi (同中書門下平章事).

In 944, Wang Xi's general Zhu Wenjin assassinated Wang Xi and took the throne himself, but later that year was in turn killed by the general Lin Renhan (林仁翰), who then submitted the Min capital Fu Prefecture (福州, in modern Fuzhou, Fujian) to Wang Yanzheng. The senior officials remaining at Fu went to Jian to request that he change the name of his state back to Min and move the capital back to Fu. Wang Yanzheng agreed to the former but not the latter (as he anticipated having to defend against an attack from the northwestern neighbor Southern Tang), so he, keeping the capital at Jian, made Fu the southern capital and put Wang Jichang in the position of overseer of the southern capital. He also sent the general Huang Renfeng (黃仁諷) with a detachment to Fu to aid Wang Jichang, along with the general Wu Chengyi (吳成義), who had already been stationed there.

However, it was said that Wang Jichang was weak in personality and often taking to drinking, not caring about his soldiers. The soldiers and the officers thus came to resent him. Two former officers, Li Renda and Chen Jixun (陳繼珣), in particular, were worried for themselves because they had both defected from Wang Yanzheng's army previously. They met with Huang and persuaded him that Wang Yanzheng himself was in such a precarious position to defend against the Southern Tang attack such that they should rebel against him and seize control of Fu for themselves. Huang agreed. That day, they led an assault on the headquarters and killed Wang Jichang and Wu, seizing control of Fu.

== Notes and references ==
- Spring and Autumn Annals of the Ten Kingdoms, vol. 94.
- Zizhi Tongjian, vol. 284.
