= Qingyuan Prefecture =

Minor state in 10th-century China

Qingyuan Prefecture 清源軍
- 949–978
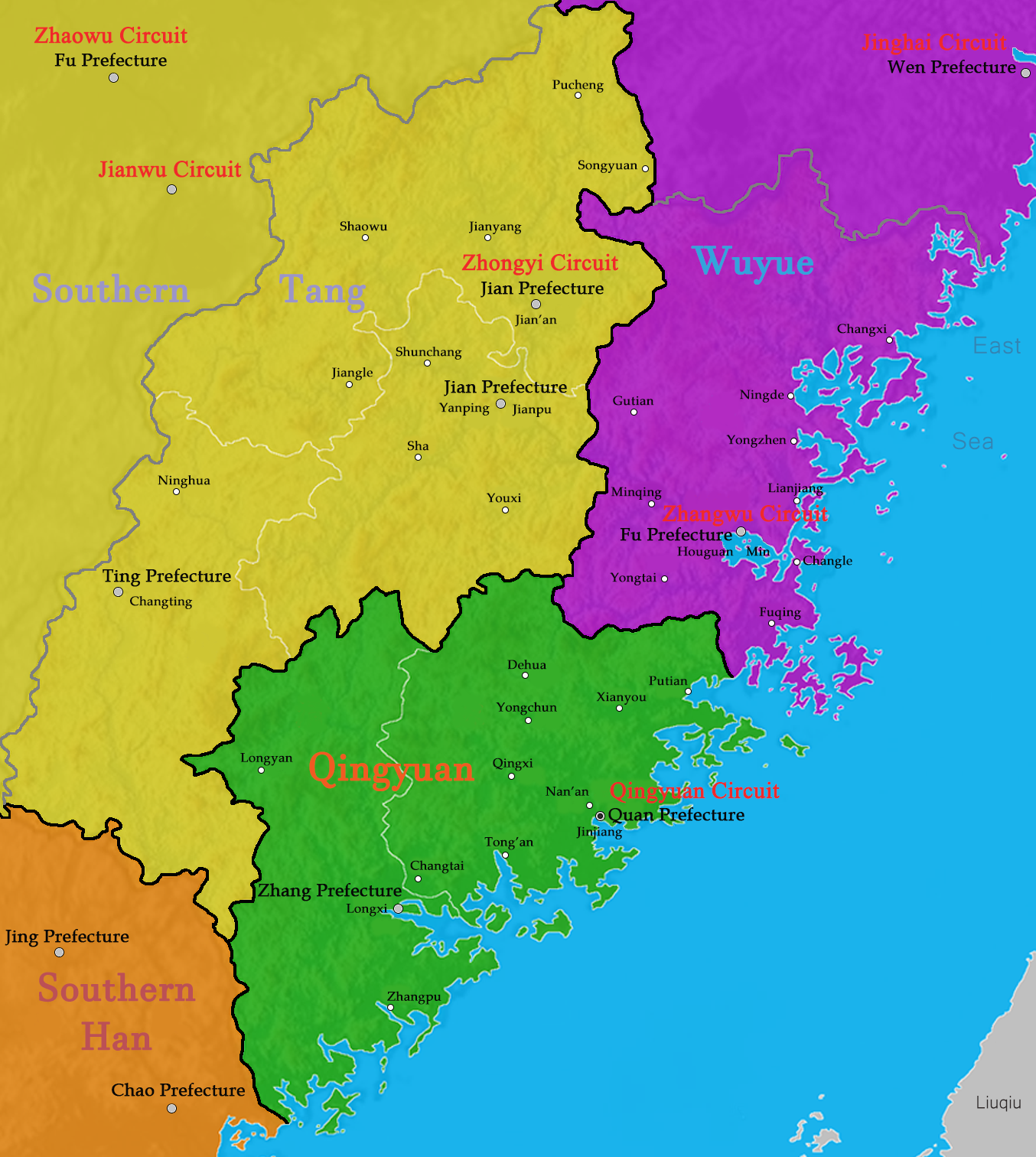
- Situation of Fujian in 957
- Status: De facto independent entity De jure Fanzhen of Southern Tang (949 - 975); De jure Fanzhen of Northern Song (960 - 978)
- Capital: Quanzhou
- Common languages: Middle Chinese; Medieval Min
- Jiedushi
  - 949 - 962: Liu Congxiao (Prince of Jinjiang)
  - 962: Liu Shaozi (Liuhou, namely acting Jiedushi)
  - 962 - 963: Zhang Hansi (Liuhou)
  - 963 - 978: Chen Hongjin
- Historical era: Five Dynasties and Ten Kingdoms period
  - Quan Prefecture gained de facto independence from Southern Tang: 947
  - Liu Congxiao controlled all of South Fujian: 949
  - Southern Tang established Qingyuan Prefecture: December 949 or January 950
  - Northern Song established Pinghai Prefecture: 9 March 964
  - Chen Hongjin surrendered to Northern Song: 3 June 978

Area
  - Total: 36,000 km^{2} (14,000 sq mi)

Population
  - 978 estimate: 800,000
- Currency: Tangguo Tongbao; Kaiyuan Tongbao; Zhouyuan Tongbao
Preceded by	Succeeded by
Southern Tang	Northern Song
- Today part of: PRC; ROC

Qingyuan Prefecture (Chinese: 清源軍) was a de facto independent prefecture late in China's Five Dynasties and Ten Kingdoms Period, renamed to Pinghai Prefecture (平海軍) in 964. It was an office created in 949 by Southern Tang's second emperor Li Jing for the warlord Liu Congxiao, who nominally submitted to him but virtually controlled Quan Prefecture (泉州, comprising modern Quanzhou, Xiamen and Putian) and Zhang Prefecture (漳州, comprising modern Zhangzhou, Xinluo and Zhangping). Prefectures in de facto independence from the Southern Tang state. (Zhang Prefecture was, at times during the Qingyuan's existence, also known as Nan Prefecture (南州). Starting in 960, in addition to being nominally submissive to Southern Tang, the Qingyuan Prefecture was also nominally submissive to the Song, which had itself become Southern Tang's nominal suzerain.

After demise of Congxiao, the prefecture was briefly ruled by his biological nephew/adoptive son Liu Shaozi, who was then overthrown by the officers Zhang Hansi and Chen Hongjin. Zhang then ruled the prefecture briefly, before Chen deposed him and took over. In 978, with Song's determination to unify China proper without the ceded sixteen prefectures in full order, Chen decided that he could not stay de facto independent and offered the control of the prefecture to Song's Emperor Taizong, ending its existence as a de facto independent entity.

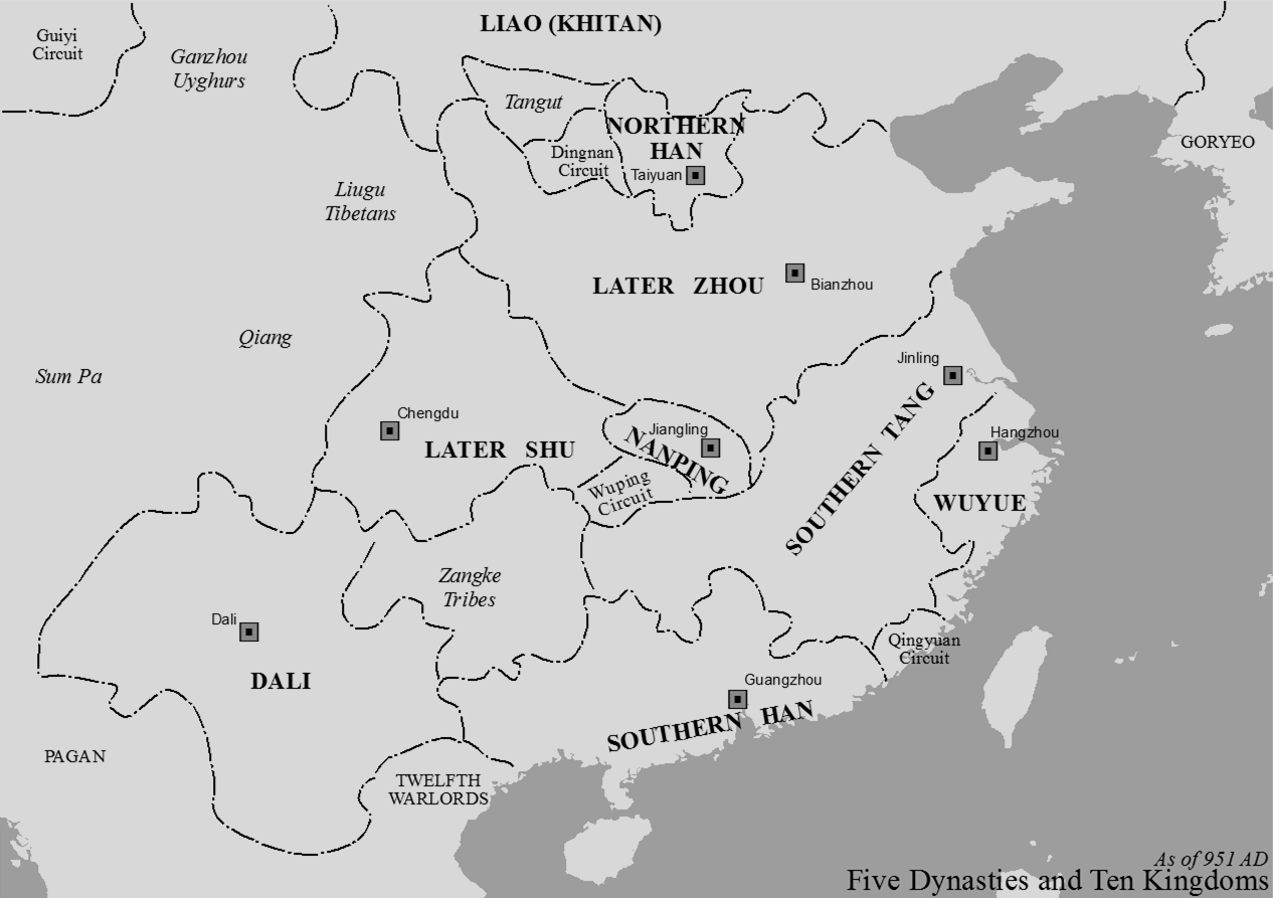
Map showing the location of Qingyuan Prefecture in the late Five Dynasties and Ten Kingdoms period

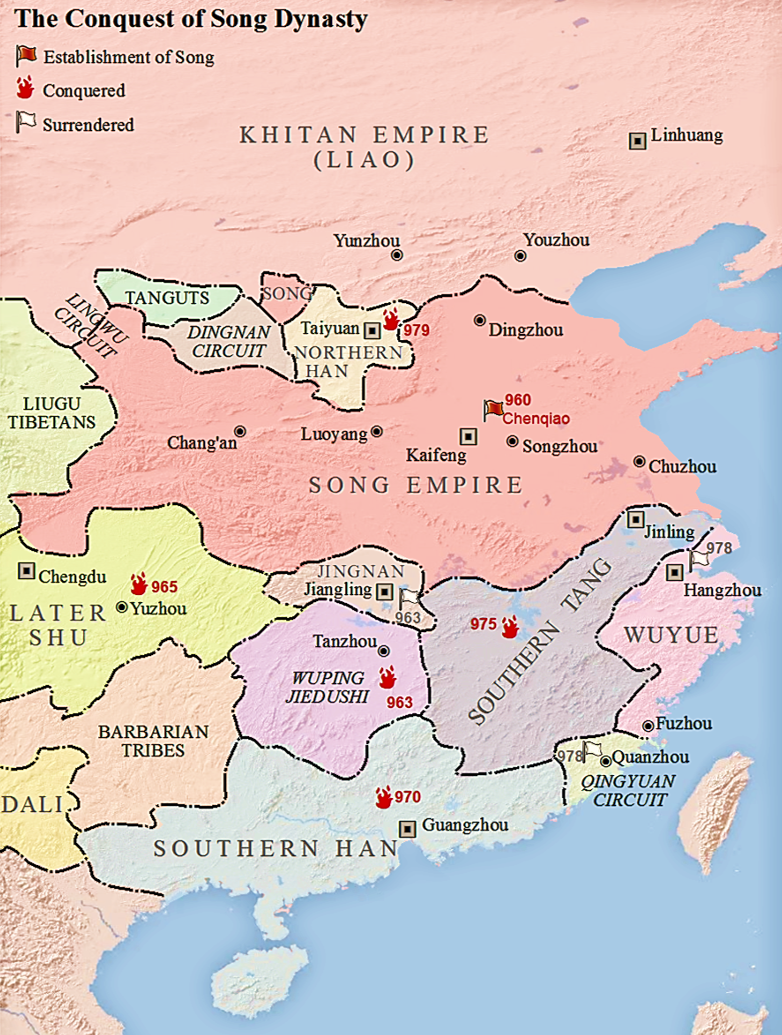
Map showing the location of Qingyuan Prefecture in the early Northern Song Dynasty

== Rulers ==
- Liu Congxiao 949–962 (in control of Quan Prefecture since 946, de facto independent since 947)
- Liu Shaozi 962
- Zhang Hansi 962–963
- Chen Hongjin 963–978

== See also ==
- Min Kingdom
- Fujian Circuit
