= Xu Zizhi Tongjian =

Xu Zizhi Tongjian (續資治通鑑; "Continuation to Zizhi Tongjian") was a book chronicling Chinese history of the Song dynasty between 960 and 1279 and the Yuan dynasty between 1279 and 1370. Credited to Bi Yuan (畢沅; 1730–1797), a high-ranking politician in the Qing dynasty, the book was not completed until after his death in 1801 by Feng Jiwu (馮集梧). Authors include historians Yan Changming (嚴長明), Cheng Jinfang (程晉芳), Shao Jinhan (邵晉涵), Hong Liangji (洪亮吉), Sun Xingyan (孫星衍) and Zhang Xuecheng (章學誠). One of the many sequels to Sima Guang's landmark work Zizhi Tongjian (資治通鑑; "Comprehensive Mirror to Aid in Government"), it follows the same format, including comments on differences from various sources. Of the 220 volumes only 38 are on the Yuan dynasty compared to 182 on the preceding Song dynasty.
