= Yin Kingdom =

Rebel state in 10th-century China

Great Yin 大殷
- 943–945
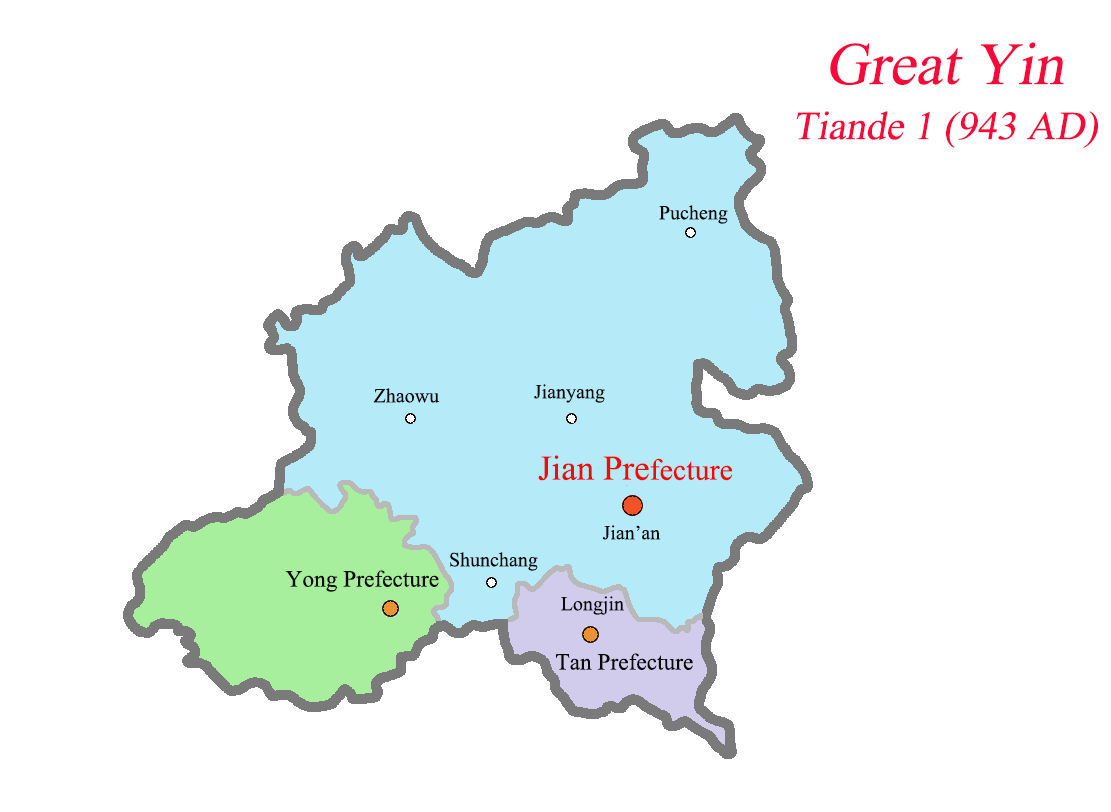
- Map of Yin, 943

- Map of Yin, early 945
- Status: Monarchy
- Capital: Jian Prefecture (modern Jian'ou)
- Common languages: Middle Chinese; Medieval Min
- Government: Monarchy
- Emperor
  - 943–945: Wang Yanzheng
- Historical era: Five Dynasties and Ten Kingdoms Period
  - Rebellion against Min by Wang Yanzheng: 943
  - Territory re-incorporated into Min: 945
Preceded by	Succeeded by
Min	Min
- Today part of: China

Yin (Chinese: 殷; pinyin: Yīn), officially the Great Yin (大殷), was a short-lived dynastic state of China from 943 to 945 in the region of Fujian. It existed during the Five Dynasties and Ten Kingdoms period, but was not counted among the 15 regimes. Yin's only emperor was Wang Yanzheng, a member of the ruling clan of the Min state. After Wang Yanzheng took the Min throne in 945, Yin's territory was re-incorporated into Min, ending its existence as a separate polity. Soon after, the Min state was conquered by the Southern Tang dynasty.

== Rebellion from Min ==
The Min Kingdom was founded in 909 after the Tang dynasty collapsed. However, after the founder of the kingdom, Wang Shenzhi, died in 925, the sons squabbled with one another. In 943, that led to an all out rebellion as one of Wang Shenzhi's sons, Wang Yanzheng, rebelled and carved out the Yin Kingdom out of the northwestern part of the Min Kingdom.

== Territorial extent ==
The Yin Kingdom was rather small, occupying an area in present-day northern Fujian and southern Zhejiang. It was bounded by Wuyue to the north, Min to the south and east, and the Southern Tang to the west.

== End of Yin as separate entity ==
In 944, Wang Yanzheng's brother and rival as the Emperor of Min, Wang Yanxi, was assassinated. Wang Yanxi's general Zhu Wenjin claimed the Min throne. In 945, Zhu was assassinated, and his army pledged allegiance to Wang Yanzheng as the Emperor of Min and asked him to return to the Min capital Changle. Wang Yanzheng claimed the Min throne, ending Yin's existence as a separate state, but did not return to Changle; rather, he remained at his base of Jian Prefecture, which Southern Tang besieged later in the year, forcing his surrender.

== Ruler ==
Emperor of Yin
Temple name	Posthumous name	Personal name	Period of reign	Era name
Did not exist	Prince Gongyi of Fu (福恭懿王)	Wang Yanzheng	943–945	Tiande (天德) (943–945)
