= Wang Yansi =

Wang Yansi (王延嗣)
- Born: 872; Guang Prefecture, Tang
- Died: 966; Probably near Yanping, Southern Tang

Chinese name
- Chinese: 王延嗣
Transcriptions
Standard Mandarin
- Hanyu Pinyin: Wáng Yánsì
- Wade–Giles: Wang^{2} Yen^{2}-ssu^{4}

Wang Jixian
- Chinese: 王季先
Transcriptions
Standard Mandarin
- Hanyu Pinyin: Wáng Jìxiān

Tang Yansi
- Chinese: 唐延嗣
Transcriptions
Standard Mandarin
- Hanyu Pinyin: Táng Yánsì
- Wade–Giles: T'ang^{2} Yen^{2}-ssu^{4}

Wang Yansi (c. 872–966), courtesy name Jixian, was a Chinese orthodox Confucian and hermit during the Tang dynasty and Five Dynasties period. He was an adopted son and advisor to Wang Shenzhi, the first ruler of Min. Though most of his recommendations were ignored (especially those concerning Min's relationship vis-à-vis Later Liang after the Tang collapsed in 907), he successfully convinced Wang Shenzhi against assuming imperial titles. After Wang Shenzhi's death, Wang Yansi went into retirement in the mountains when his adoptive brothers Wang Yanhan, Wang Yanbing and Wang Yanjun were engaged in fratricidal wars. Later in his life he taught Confucian classics and changed his name to Tang Yansi.
