= Liu Hua =

Liu Hua may refer to:

- Liu Hua (Wang Yanjun's wife) (896–930), niece of Southern Han's ruler Liu Yan, and wife of Min's ruler Wang Yanjun
- Liu Hua (actor) (born 1961), Chinese actor
