= Huangchuan railway station =

Railway station in Henan, China

Huangchuan 潢川
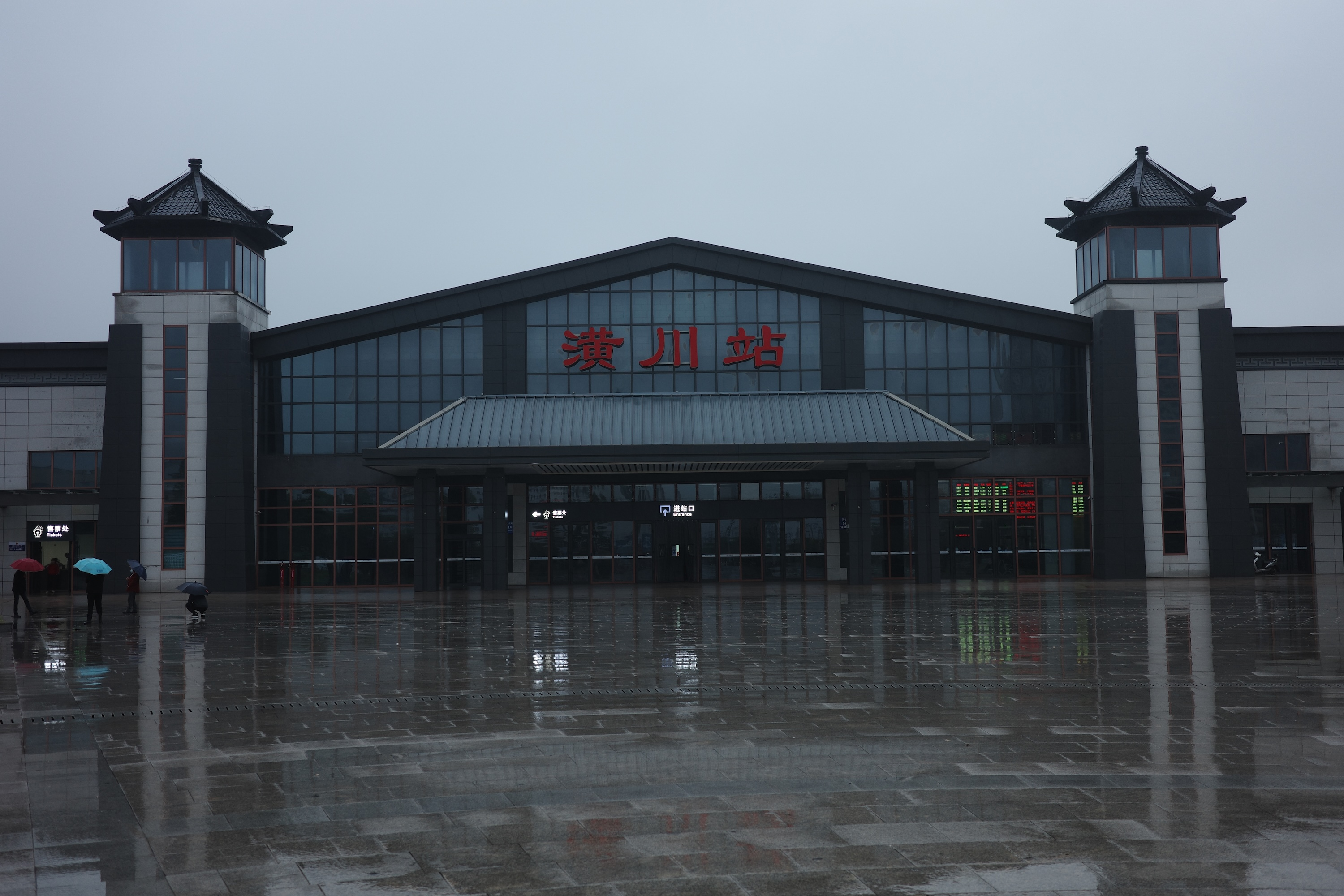
- The station in 2025

General information
- Location: Huangchuan County, Xinyang, Henan; China
- Coordinates: 32.1135°N 115.0979°E
- Operated by: China Railway
- Lines: Beijing–Kowloon railway Nanjing–Xi'an railway Fuyang–Huanggang–Jiujiang high-speed railway (planned)

History
- Opened: 1996
Location

Huangchuan railway station (Chinese: 潢川站; pinyin: Huángchuān Zhàn) is a railway station in Huangchuan County, Xinyang, Henan, China. It is located at the intersection between the Beijing–Kowloon railway and the Nanjing–Xi'an railway.

The planned Fuyang–Huanggang–Jiujiang section of the Beijing–Hong Kong (Taipei) corridor will stop here.

== History ==
The station opened in 1996 with the Beijing–Kowloon railway. In 2007, it was transferred from the Nanchang Railway Bureau to the Wuhan Railway Bureau.

In 2019 and 2020, the station buildings were enlarged and refurbished.

== Gallery ==
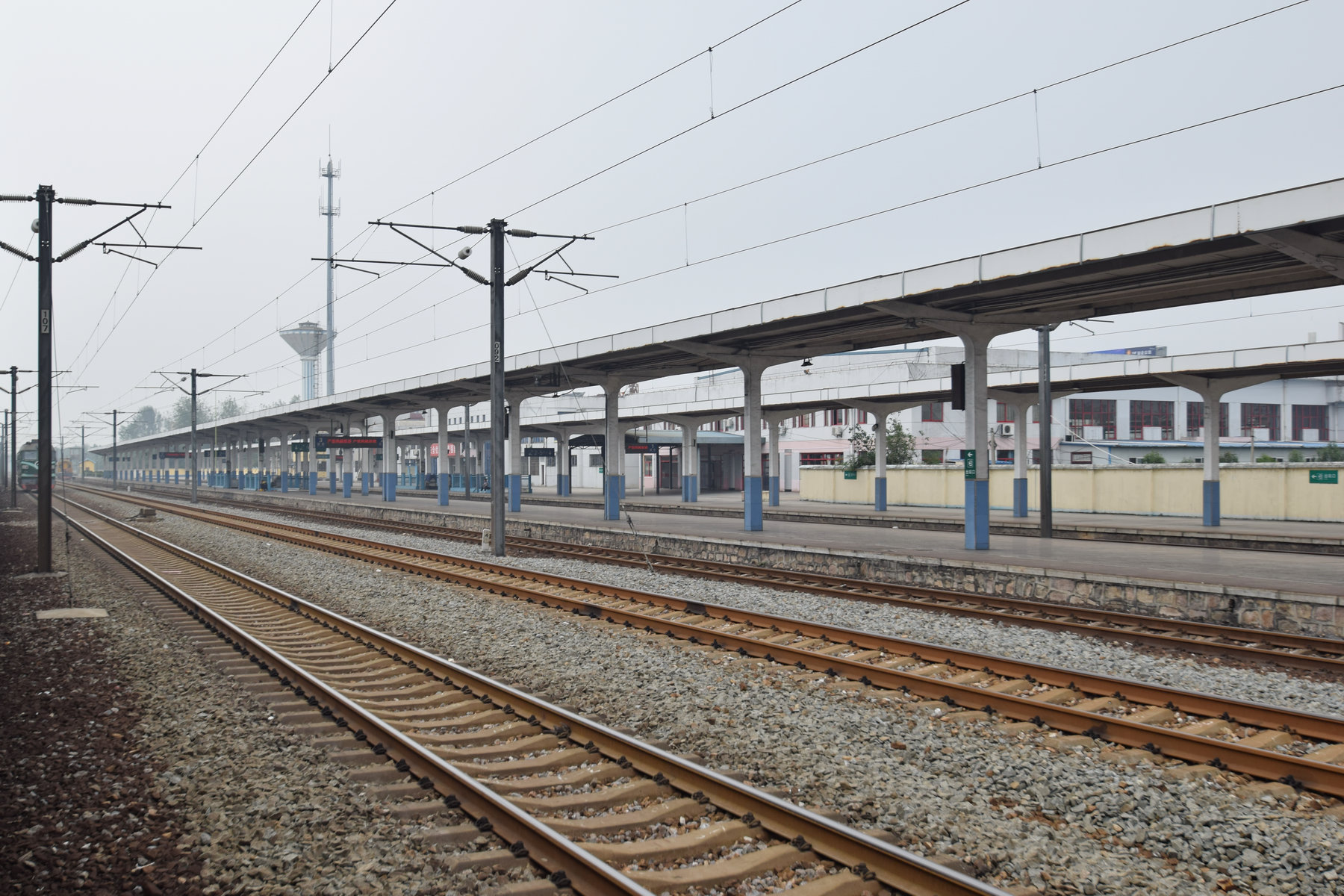
Platforms in 2015

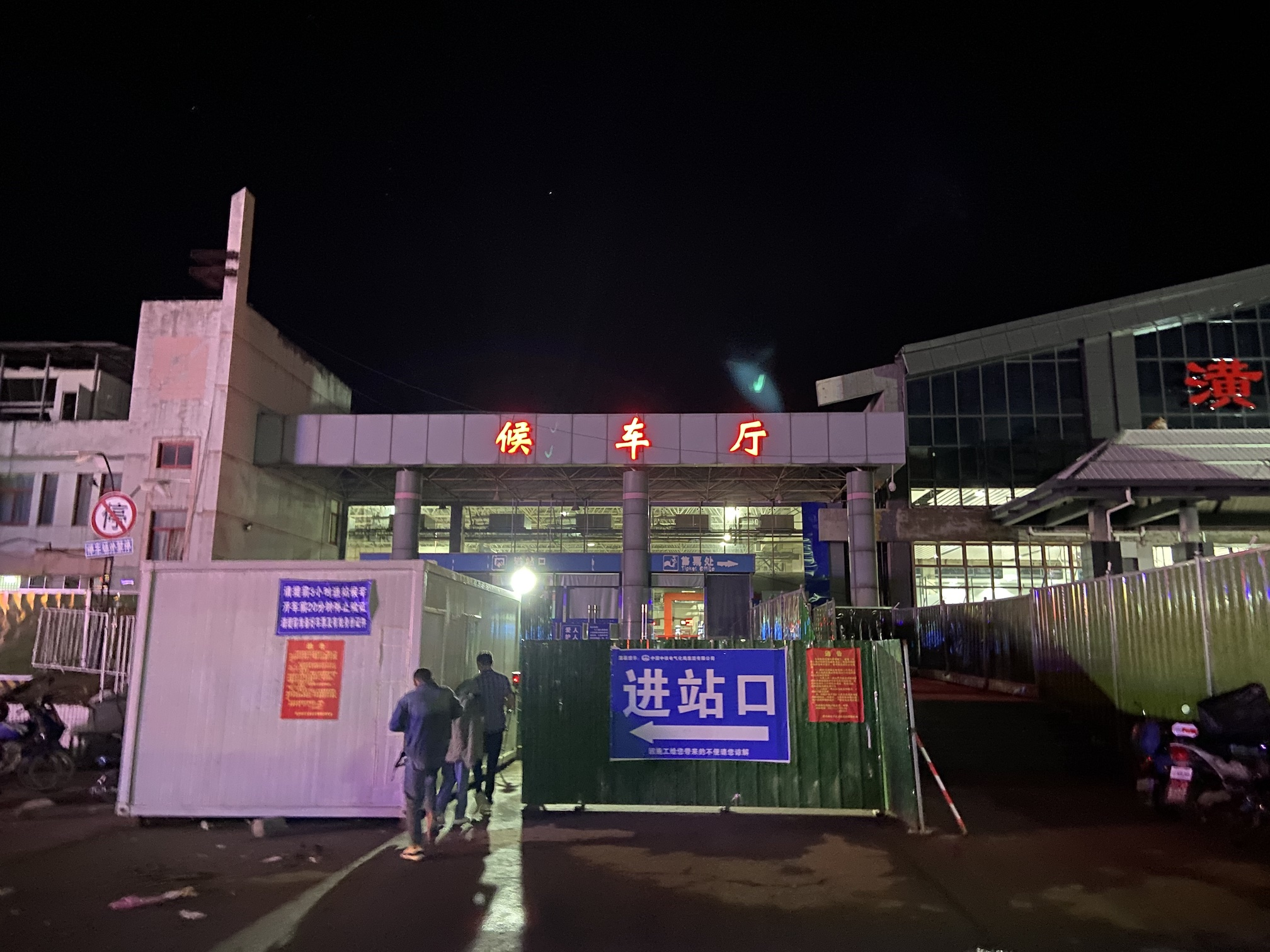
The station undergoing renovation in 2020

Preceding station	China Railway	Following station
Huaibin towards Beijing West	Beijing–Kowloon railway	Guangshan towards Hung Hom
Shangcheng towards Nanjing	Nanjing–Xi'an railway	Xixian towards Xi'an
