= Chen Jinfeng =

- Empress consort of Min
- Born: 893
- Died: 17 November 935 (aged 41–42)
- Spouse: Wang Yanjun
- Father: Chen Yan
- Mother: Lady Lu

Chen Jinfeng (陳金鳳) (893 – 17 November 935) was the third known wife of Wang Yanjun (Emperor Huizong, also known as Wang Lin), a ruler of the Chinese Five Dynasties and Ten Kingdoms period Min state. Wang Yanjun, while not the first ruler of Min, was the first to claim imperial title, and Empress Chen was the first Empress of Min. When Wang Yanjun was assassinated in 935, she was also killed.

== Background ==
According to her biography in the Spring and Autumn Annals of the Ten Kingdoms (十國春秋), Chen Jinfeng was born in 893. Her father, legally, was Chen Yan, the governor of Fujian Circuit (福建, headquartered in modern Fuzhou, Fujian) — yet the biography indicated that Chen Yan was not her biological father. Rather, Chen Yan had a homosexual affair with a young handsome man, Hou Lun (侯倫), who thereafter also had an affair with his concubine Lady Lu, leading to Lady Lu's pregnancy. After Chen Yan's death in or shortly after 891, Lady Lu was initially taken into the household of his brother-in-law Fan Hui (范暉), who initially claimed the title of acting governor. While at Fan's household, Lady Lu gave birth to Chen Jinfeng (meaning, "golden phoenix") — as one night before Chen Jinfeng's birth, she dreamed of a fenghuang flying into her bosom.

In 893, Wang Shenzhi, then a general under his brother Wang Chao the prefect of Quan Prefecture (泉州, in modern Quanzhou, Fujian), captured Fujian's capital Fu Prefecture (福州), and Fan was killed in flight, allowing Wang Chao to take over control of the circuit. After Fan's defeat, Chen Jinfeng, then a child, was apparently lost among the common people, but was eventually taken in by her clansman Chen Kuangsheng (陳匡勝) and raised in his household.

== As Wang Shenzhi's concubine ==
In 909, by which time Wang Shenzhi was the ruler of the circuit, now known as Weiwu Circuit (威武), he was also carrying the title of Prince of Min as a vassal of Later Liang. That year, he was selecting women from well-reputed households to be his concubines. At that time, Chen Jinfeng was 16, and, according to the Spring and Autumn Annals of the Ten Kingdoms, was said to be beautiful and capable of dancing. Wang Shenzhi took her as a concubine, giving her the title of Cairen (才人). (However, the Spring and Autumn Annals of the Ten Kingdoms also acknowledged that according to the more formal Zizhi Tongjian, she was said to be ugly and licentious, and also indicated that she was just a servant girl in Wang Shenzhi's palace, not a concubine.) According to the Spring and Autumn Annals of the Ten Kingdoms, she was favored as much as Lady Huang, and he built her a palace near a lake so that she could often see the lake.

== As Wang Yanjun's concubine ==
Wang Shenzhi died in 925 and was succeeded by his son Wang Yanhan, who in turn was killed around the new year 927 by his adoptive brother Wang Yanbing and younger biological brother Wang Yanjun, who then succeeded him. It was said that at one point, when he was on a palace gate, he saw Chen Jinfeng and was enticed by her, and thereafter made her a concubine and gave her the consort title of Shufei (淑妃), favoring her greatly.

== As empress ==
In 933, Wang Yanjun claimed imperial title as the Emperor of Min (as Emperor Huizong). In 935, he created Consort Chen empress, bypassing his then-wife Lady Jin. He also made Chen Kuangsheng and another clansman, Chen Shou'en (陳守恩), officials in his palace.

That year, it was said that Empress Chen's stepson (Wang Yanjun's son) Wang Jipeng the Prince of Fu, was carrying on an affair with a lady-in-waiting, Li Chunyan. Wang Jipeng revealed this to Empress Chen and requested her help; Empress Chen thus explained this to Wang Yanjun for him and persuaded Wang Yanjun to give Li to Wang Jipeng.

Meanwhile, though, it was said that in his late years, Wang Yanjun had suffered from strokes, and Empress Chen thereafter carried on affairs with his close associate Gui Shouming (歸守明) and another official, Li Keyin (李可殷). As Li Keyin had falsely accused the guard officer Li Fang (李仿), and Chen Kuangsheng had been disrespectful to Wang Jipeng, both Li Fang and Wang Jipeng resented the current situation. As Wang Yanjun's illness progressed, both Li Fang and Wang Jipeng thought he would die and that Wang Jipeng would get the chance to succeed him.

On 16 November 935, Li Fang sent several soldiers to assassinate Li Keyin, greatly shocking the people of the Min state. The next day (17 November), Wang Yanjun was less ill, and Empress Chen informed him of Li Keyin's death. Shocked, he took his seat in the imperial hall and ordered an investigation into Li Keyin's death. In fear, Li Fang mobilized his troop and had them enter the palace. The soldiers wounded Wang Yanjun severely and his ladies-in-waiting, not willing to see him suffer further, killed him. Li Fang and Wang Jipeng thereafter killed Empress Chen, Chen Shou'en, Chen Kuangsheng, Gui, and Wang Jipeng's younger brother Wang Jitao (王繼韜), whom Wang Jipeng had long had a rivalry with. Wang Jipeng then took over the throne.

== Notes and references ==
- Spring and Autumn Annals of the Ten Kingdoms (十國春秋), vol. 94.
- Zizhi Tongjian, vol. 279.

Chinese nobility
Preceded by Lady Jin (as wife of sovereign)	Empress of Min; 935	Succeeded by Lady Li (as wife of sovereign)
