= Wuhan metropolitan area intercity railway =

Railway network in Wuhan, China

Wuhan Metropolitan Area intercity railway

Overview
- Locale: Wuhan and surrounding area
- Transit type: Higher-speed rail

Operation
- Began operation: 2013
- Operator: China Railway Wuhan Group

Technical
- Track gauge: 1,435 mm (4 ft 8 1/2 in) standard gauge
- Electrification: AC 25 kV overhead lines
System map

Wuhan metropolitan area intercity railway
- Traditional Chinese: 武漢城市圈城際軌道交通
- Simplified Chinese: 武汉城市圈城际轨道交通
Transcriptions
Standard Mandarin
- Hanyu Pinyin: Wǔhàn Chéngshì Quān Chéngjì Guǐdào Jiāotōng

The Wuhan Metropolitan Area intercity railway or Wuhan Metropolitan Area intercity railway system is a network of higher-speed commuter railways in and around Wuhan, the capital of the Chinese province Hubei. The first line of the system opened at the end of 2013, two more in mid-2014, one in 2016.

== System composition ==
The network will include the following lines:

- The Wuhan–Xianning intercity railway, opened on December 28, 2013. The system's first line connects Wuhan's Wuchang Railway Station with the city's southern suburbs and the city of Xianning. Initially, the service is very limited (a few trains a day), but eventually it will be brought to a commuter frequency.
- The Wuhan–Huangshi intercity railway and Wuhan–Huanggang intercity railway share tracks within Wuhan's eastern suburbs and then diverge. The Huangshi line goes toward Ezhou, Huangshi, and Daye, while the Huanggang line crosses the Yangtze River to Huanggang. The construction of the lines was largely completed by the end of December 2013. After a period of testing, the two lines opened on June 18, 2014. The Wuhan–Huangshi line also serves as the first section of the future Wuhan–Jiujiang Passenger Railway, opened in 2017.
- The Wuhan–Xiaogan intercity railway serves the city's northern suburbs, the Wuhan Tianhe International Airport, and the city of Xiaogan. Early on, it was expected to open in 2015. However, the completion date has been moved back. It is opened on December 1, 2016.

Preliminary plans exist for the construction of more lines (to Tianmen and Qianjiang) as well.

== Ridership ==
In a report released during the Spring Festival travel season of 2015, the total ridership of the 3 lines of the Wuhan Metropolitan Area intercity railway was estimated at 25,000 a day; that was described as twice the daily amount outside of the peak travel season.
