= Huang River (Huai River tributary) =

Huang river
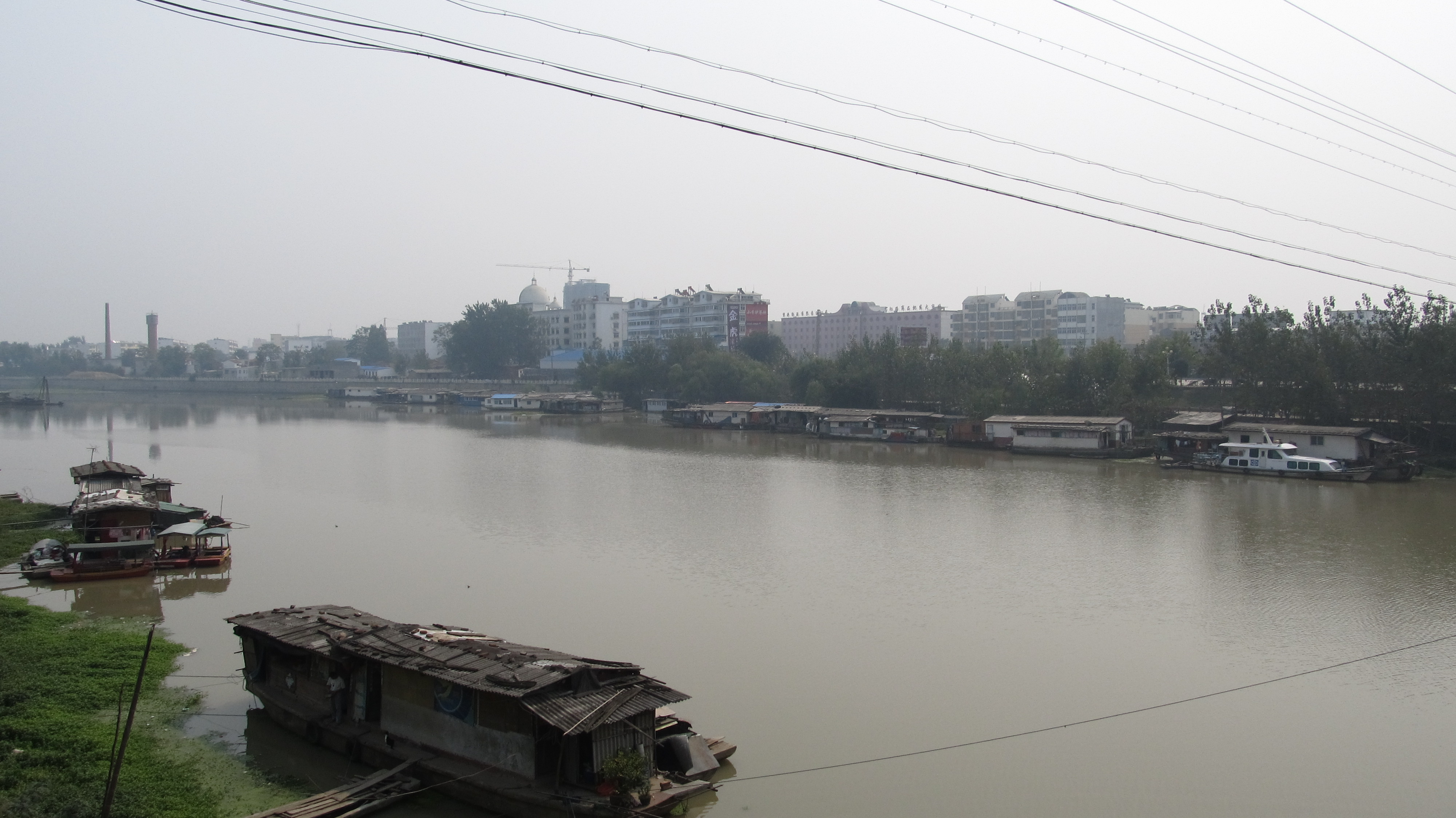
- Huang River in Huangchuan County

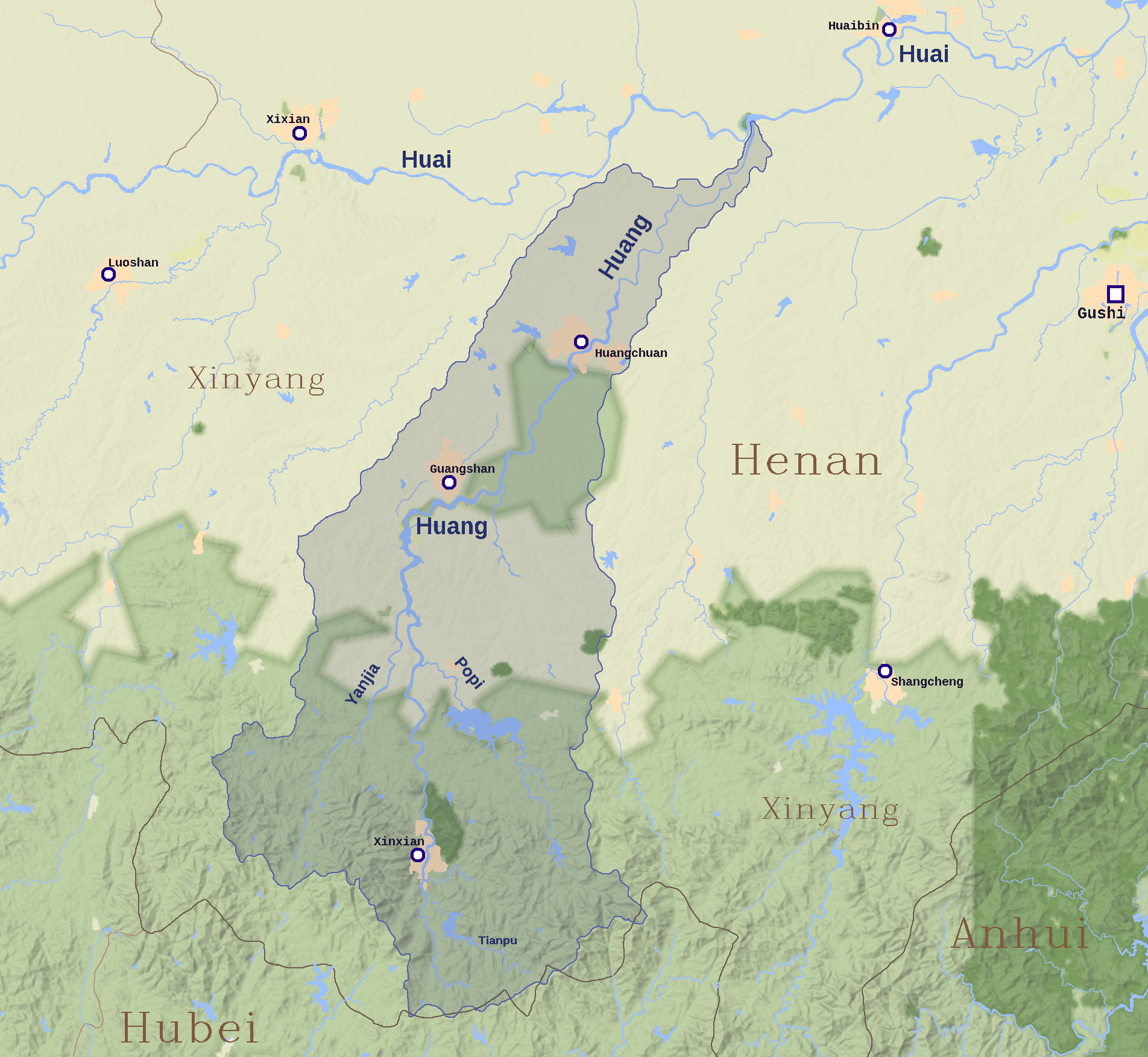

Location
- Country: People's Republic of China

Physical characteristics
- Mouth
  - location: Huai River
  - coordinates: 31°30′21″N 114°58′14″E
- Length: 140 km (87 mi)
- Basin size: 2,400 km^{2} (930 sq mi)

The Huang River (Chinese: 潢河; pinyin: Huáng Hé) is a tributary of the Huai River in Henan Province, Central China. The Huang rises in southeastern Xin County and flows northward across the Guangshan County and Huangchuan County to reach its mouth at the northeastern Xuezi Town of the Huangchuan County. The river has a length of 140 kilometres (87 mi) and drains an area of 2,400 square kilometres (930 sq mi).
