= Ren Neiming =

Ren Neiming (任內明) (865 – July 2, 918), courtesy name Zhaohua (昭華), formally Lady Shangxian of Wei (魏國尚賢夫人), was the wife of Wang Shenzhi (Prince Zhongyi), the founding ruler of Min, a state during the Chinese Five Dynasties and Ten Kingdoms period.

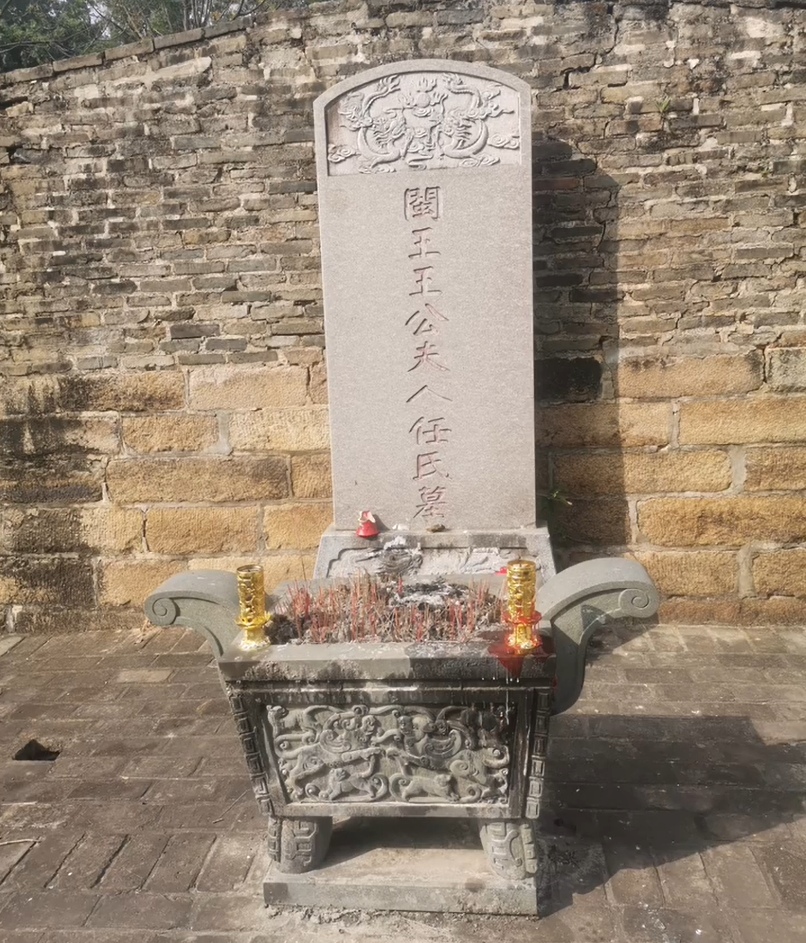
Tomb of Ren Neiming

== Traditional sources ==
Very little was recorded about Lady Ren in extant sources, which indicated that her geographic origins and her family background had been lost to history even when the sources were written. She was created a lady (國夫人, Guo Furen) during Wang Shenzhi's reign as the Prince of Min. She carried that title for several years before her death. She was buried on the backside of Mount Fengchi (鳳池山) in Fu Prefecture (福州, in modern Fuzhou, Fujian). After Wang Shengzhi himself died in 925, he was buried with her. In the Longqi era of Wang Shenzhi's son Wang Yanjun (who had claimed imperial title by that point), who was born of his primary concubine Lady Huang, Wang Shenzhi and Lady Ren were posthumously honored emperor and empress.

== Tombstone ==
Lady Ren's tombstone, which had been discovered in modern times, however, provided her name, title, and more background information. She was said to be from Jin'an (晉安, i.e., Fuzhou). Her father was named Ren Hui (任暉), and mother was a Lady Luo. She had two brothers, Ren Yanwen (任彥溫) and Ren Yanzhang (任彥章). She died on July 2, 918, at the age of 53. As her tombstone listed only five sons and three daughters (which would have included Wang Shenzhi's children who were not actually born of her) and Wang Shenzhi's listed 12 sons and eight daughters, presumably, seven of his sons and five of his daughters were born after her death.

== Notes and references ==
Chinese nobility
Preceded by None (kingdom founded)	Lady consort of Min; 909–918	Succeeded by Lady Cui
