= Huanggang East railway station =

Railway station in Huanggang, Hubei

Huanggang East 黄冈东
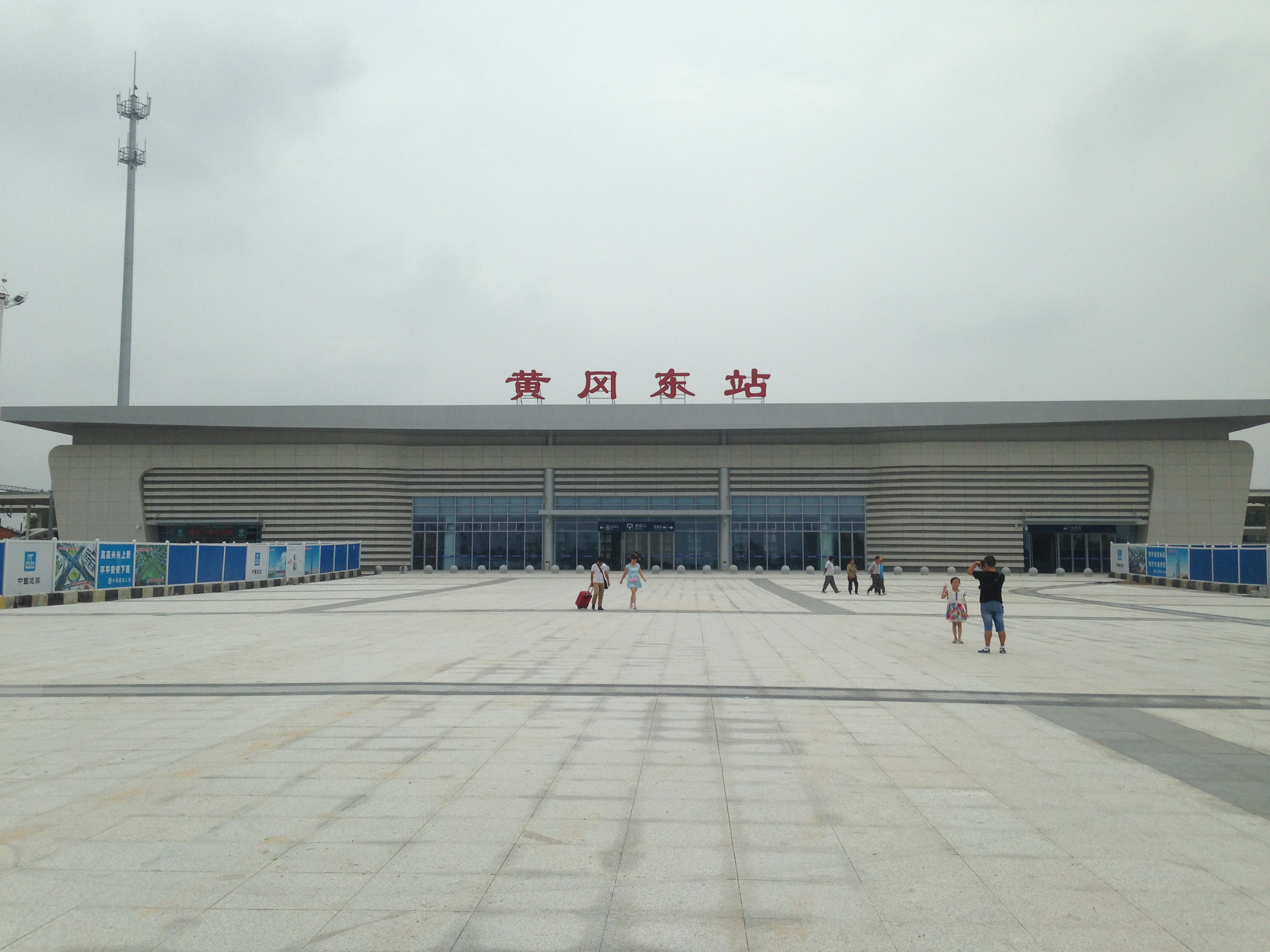

General information
- Location: Huangzhou District, Huanggang, Hubei; China
- Coordinates: 30°30′31.64″N 114°58′52.95″E
- Line(s): Wuhan–Huanggang intercity railway; Huanggang–Huangmei high-speed railway

Huanggang East railway station (Chinese: 黄冈东站) is a railway station in Huangzhou District, Huanggang, Hubei, China. It was built as a terminus station at the eastern end of the Wuhan–Huanggang intercity railway. With the completion of the Huanggang–Huangmei high-speed railway, it became an intermediate stop on the railway between Wuhan and Huangmei.

From 12 August 2022, a new service pattern was implemented that included regular services to Wuhan East railway station.

The station has two island platforms and four platform faces.
