= Fujian Museum =

Provincial museum of Fujian province in China

Coordinates: 26.0971°N 119.2821°E

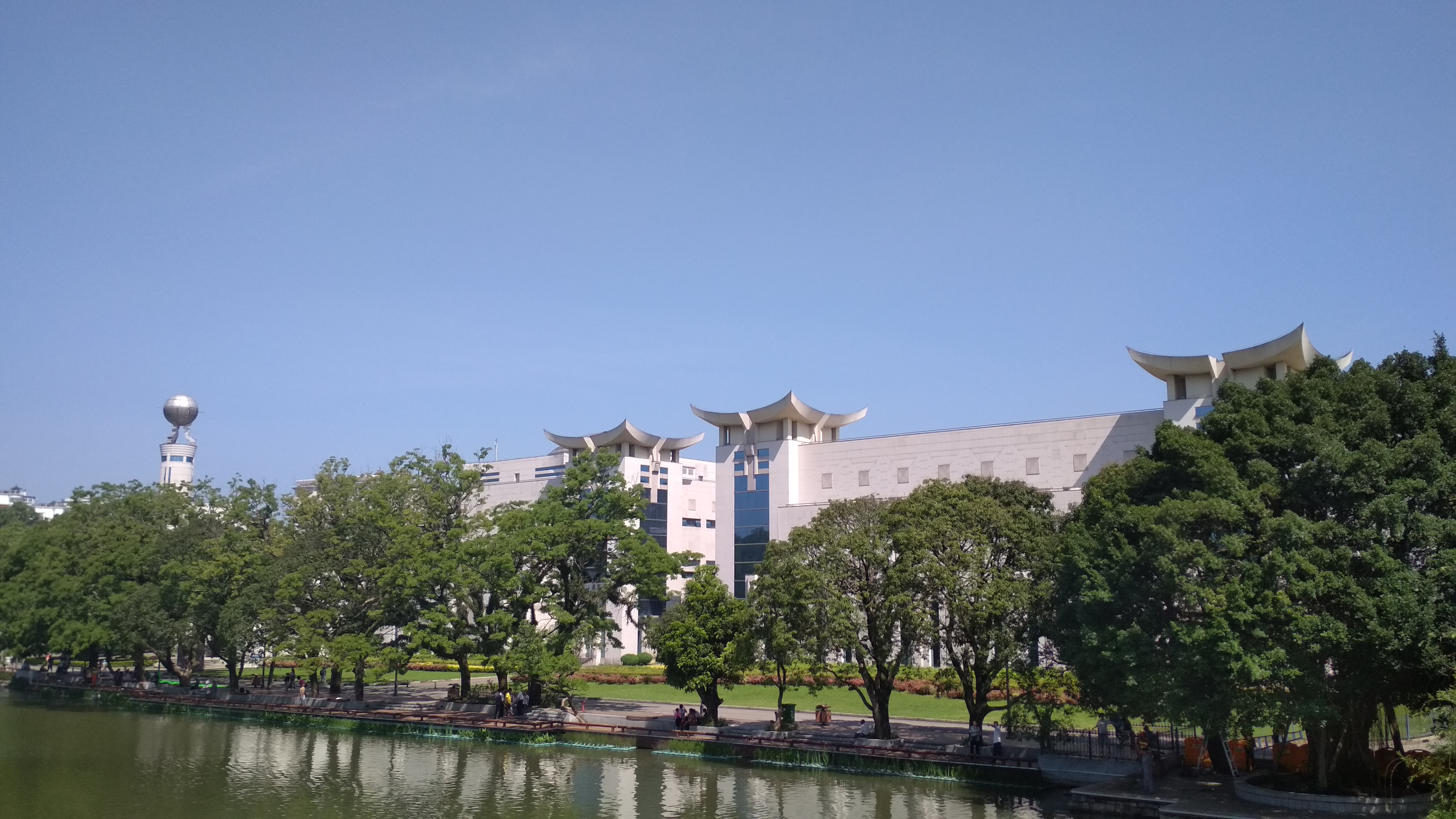
Fujian Museum

Fujian Museum (Chinese: 福建博物院) is the provincial museum of Fujian province in China established in 1933. It is located in the city capital of Fuzhou at No. 96, Hutou Jie next to the West Lake Park.

The museum was completed in October 2002, covering an area of 6 hectares and a building area of 36,000 square meters. The total investment of the museum's complex is 270 million Yuan.

As a national first-class museum, the Fujian Museum has a collection of more than 170,000 relics and natural specimens.

== Digital preservation efforts ==
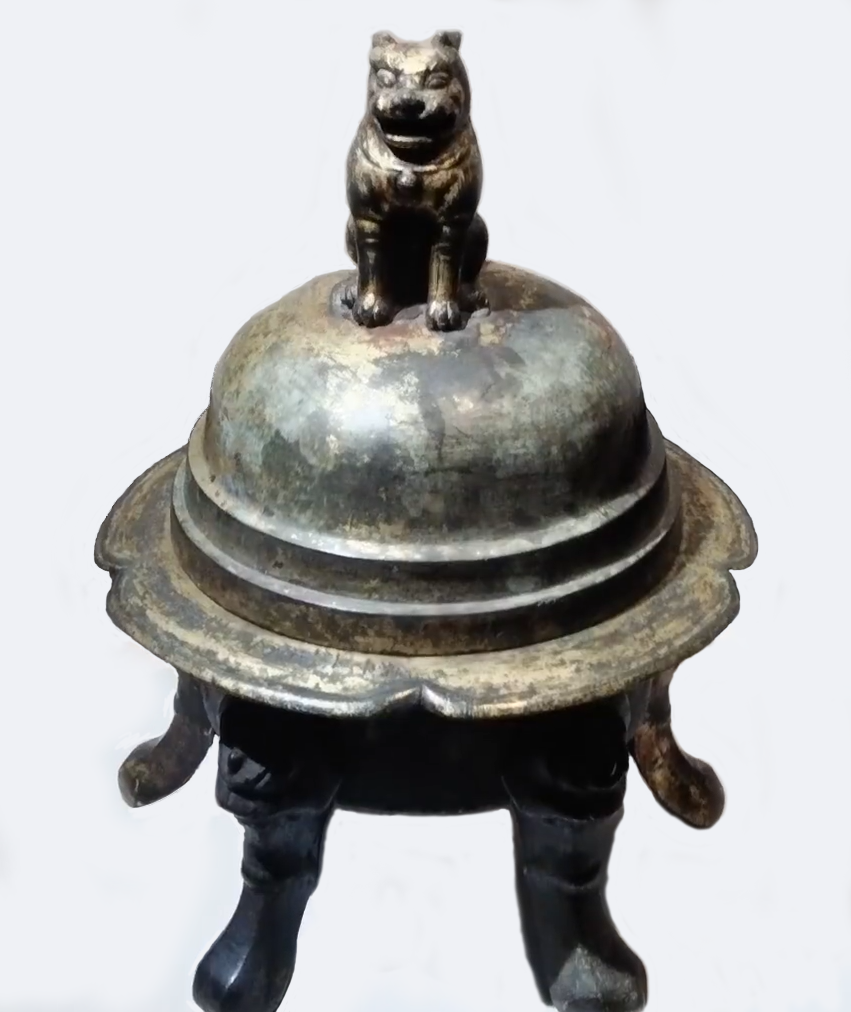
The bronze gilt lion-shaped incense burner of Wang Yanhan, King of Min

Fujian Museum has devoted much more attention to digital preservation efforts than Lin Zexu Memorial Hall. With a collection of nearly 170,000 cultural relics and natural specimens, including more than 30,000 precious cultural relics. There are collections available online on the museum's website with comprehensive catalog information. For 30 items, there are high-resolution digital photographs and captions with analyses for each. Below are three examples from the website (summarized and translated):

1) “青铜大铙” - 700 B.C.E (Large bronze cymbals)

This relic was discovered in Jianou city on December 26, 1978 and is 76.8 cm high, 29.8 cm long and weighs 100.35 kg. It is fan-shaped with casting, each side having 18 mastoid shaped. The vessel body is full of cloud thunder patterned-grain with two sides decorated with creatures. The spiral belt takes fine cloud thunder patterned-grain as background and the face of the clock is decorated with thick and deep lines of thunder and cloud. The tunnel in the center of the drum is slightly higher. Its huge cymbal body, fine decoration, make it very rare in China.

2) “中华苏维埃共和国福建省苏维埃执行委员会银印” Fujian Soviet executive committee of the Chinese Soviet Republic silver seal - 1934

Silver, 9.8 cm in diameter with rounded, hollow bottom, the silver seal has interior engraved with sickle and hammer. Its outer ring is decorated with convex circle engraved with official script of the Soviet republic of China, and the ring's left and right sides composed of five-stars that represent the Chinese Soviet Republic. On the bottom, it is engraved with "Soviet executive committee of Fujian province." This seal is the only silver seal for the Soviet government of Fujian province government.

3) “明德化窑文昌坐像” Mingde HuaJiao Wenchang Sitting Statue

White, delicate, marbled, and pure, the Wenchang Sitting Statue is 44 cm high, 21.5 cm wide on the bottom with the spiral "He Chaozong seal" engraved. Wenchang has a round head, phoenix-shaped eyes, and short beard, with solemn and composed expression. His right hand holds traditional Chinese symbol for propitiousness, and his left hand is hidden in long-sleeve robe. The glaze of the statue is milky white, pure and bright.

== See also ==
- List of museums in China
