= Lady Li (Wang Jipeng) =

Lady Li (李夫人, personal name unknown), formally the Lady of Liang (梁國夫人), was the first (known) wife of Wang Jipeng (later known as Wang Chang), an emperor of the Chinese Five Dynasties and Ten Kingdoms Period Min state.

Lady Li was a cousin to Wang Jipeng — her mother was a sister to his father Wang Yanjun (known as Wang Lin during his reign as emperor), and her father was the official Li Min (李敏), who served as a chancellor during Wang Lin's reign. It is not known when she married Wang Jipeng, but as historical accounts referred to her as his "original princess" (元妃), it was probably during the time he was the Prince of Fu under his father. She eventually carried the title of Lady of Liang.

However, even during Wang Lin's reign, Wang Jipeng was carrying on an affair with Wang Lin's lady in waiting Li Chunyan and, later, through the intercession of Wang Lin's third wife Empress Chen Jinfeng, Wang Jipeng was able to receive Li Chunyan as a concubine. After Wang Lin was assassinated in 935 and Wang Jipeng succeeded to the throne (and changed his name to Wang Chang), he immediately gave Li Chunyan the imperial consort title of Xianfei (賢妃) while not giving Lady Li a higher title and not showing much favor for her. His chancellor Ye Qiao tried to speak on her behalf, pointing out that Lady Li was an emperor's niece and was his proper wife, and should not be ignored. Wang Chang, rather than listening to Ye, distanced himself from Ye and later forced him into retirement. In 936, he created Consort Li empress, bypassing Lady Li. It was said that, in her lifetime, Lady Li never received a title higher than Lady of Liang, although it is not known when she died.

== Notes and references ==
- Spring and Autumn Annals of the Ten Kingdoms, vol. 94.
- Zizhi Tongjian, vols. 279, 280.

Chinese nobility
| Preceded by Empress Chen Jinfeng | Lady consort of Min; 935–936 | Succeeded by Empress Li Chunyan |
