= Ye Qiao =

Ye Qiao (葉翹) was an official of the Chinese Five Dynasties and Ten Kingdoms Period state Min, serving as a chancellor during the reign of its fourth ruler Wang Chang (né Wang Jipeng).

== Background ==
It is not known when Ye Qiao was born, and other than the fact that he was from Yongtai (永泰, in modern Fuzhou, Fujian), nothing was recorded in traditional accounts about his family background. Ye was said to be well-learned and honest. During the reign of Min's third ruler Wang Lin, Wang Lin made him a member of the staff of his son Wang Jipeng the Prince of Fu. Wang Jipeng honored him as a teacher, and benefited much from his guidance. The people in the palace referred to him as "Guo Weng" (國翁, "old gentleman of the realm"). He also carried the title of secretary to the commander of the imperial guards (as Wang Jipeng was the commander of the imperial guards).

== During Wang Chang's reign ==
In 935, Wang Lin was assassinated — with Wang Jipeng being part of the plot to assassinate him but later disavowed responsibility — and Wang Jipeng took the throne and changed his name to Wang Chang. He made Ye Qiao the director of palace affairs (宣徽使, Xuanhuishi) and chancellor, with the designation Can Zhengshi (參政事).

However, it was said that after Wang Chang became emperor, he became arrogant and excessive in his behavior, and was no longer consulting Ye on important decisions. One day, after Wang Chang was about to hear some matters of state, Ye intentionally walked out of the palace wearing the clothes of a Taoist monk. Wang Chang immediately summoned him back, and stated to him, "There are many things happening with the military and the state, but we have not talked with you for a long time. This is our fault." Ye bowed, and responded, "Your old subject is counseling you poorly, such that after Your Imperial Majesty took the throne, you have not had any good accomplishments to speak of. I beg to retire." Wang Chang replied, "The late Emperor trusted us to you, Lord. If our policy decisions were not good decisions, you, Lord, should speak openly. Why do you abandon us?" He rewarded much gold and silk to Ye, and told Ye to retake his position as chancellor.

However, Wang's honoring of Ye did not last. Wang's wife was Lady Li, the daughter of the chancellor Li Min (李敏) and a sister of Wang Lin's. However, Wang favored his concubine Consort Li Chunyan and treated Lady Li coldly. Ye stated to Wang, "The Lady is a niece of the late Emperor. She became your wife with proper ceremony. Why do you abandon her because you have a new love?" Wang ignored Ye, and thereafter became to distance himself from Ye. Not long after that, there was an occasion when Ye was submitting a petition on another matter. Wang wrote a comment on it, "The leaf is falling into the imperial moat!" ("Ye" means "leaf.") He thereafter put Ye into retirement at Yongtai, and Ye died there in retirement, although the date is not known.

== Notes and references ==
- Spring and Autumn Annals of the Ten Kingdoms, vol. 96.
- Zizhi Tongjian, vol. 279.
