= Huanggang West railway station =

Railway station in Huanggang, Hubei

Huanggang West 黄冈西
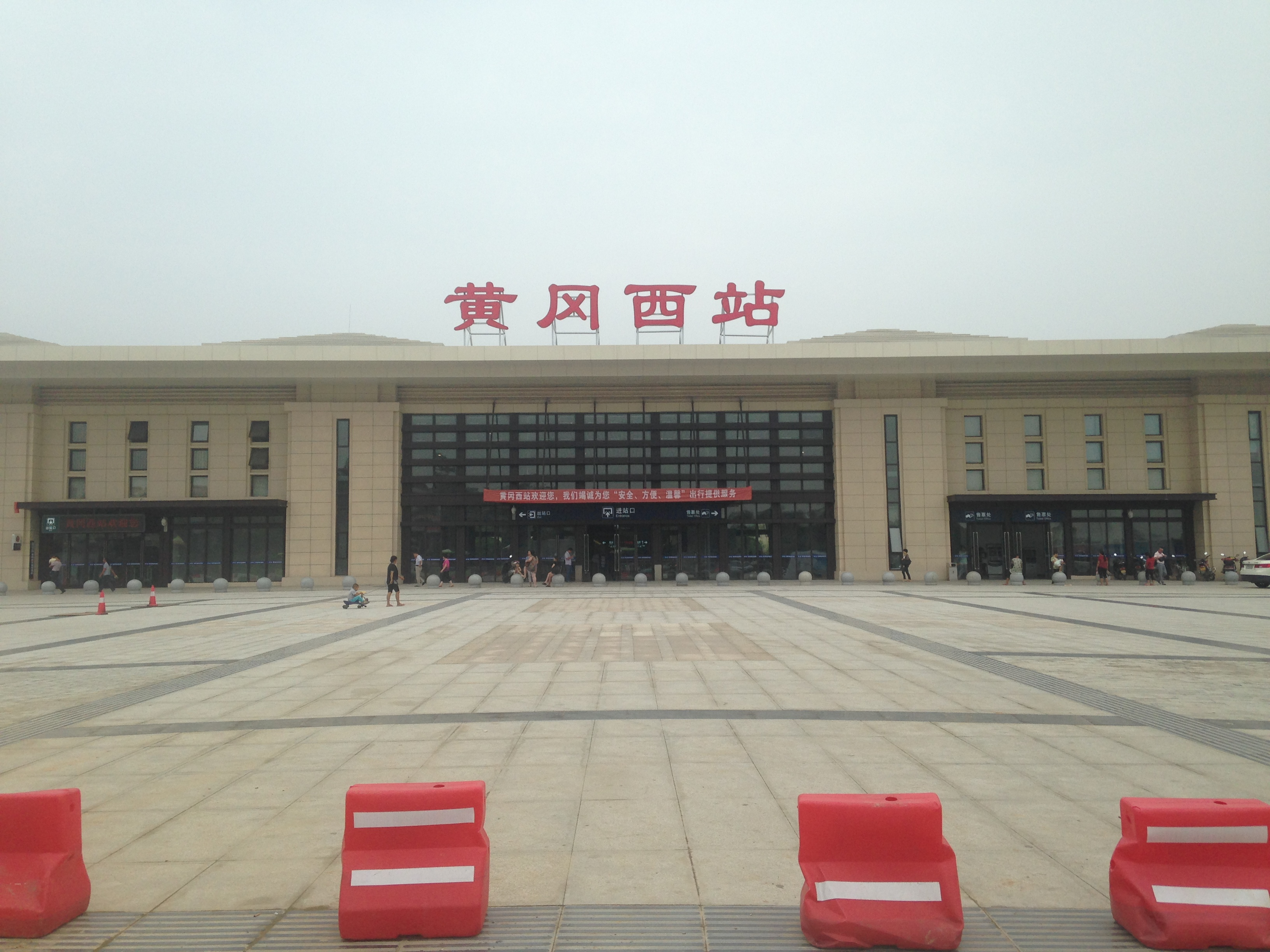

General information
- Location: Huangzhou District, Huanggang, Hubei; China
- Coordinates: 30°30′25.46″N 114°53′1.43″E
- Line: Wuhan–Huanggang intercity railway

History
- Opened: 18 June 2014
Location

Huanggang West railway station (Chinese: 黄冈西站) is a railway station in Huangzhou District, Huanggang, Hubei, China.

The station opened on 18 June 2014. The station was closed from 11 May 2021 to allow for renovations. The work included increasing the number of platforms from two to four and extending the platforms to allow for longer trains.
