= Liu Hua (Wang Yanjun's wife) =

Liu Hua (Chinese: 劉華; 896-May 31, 930), courtesy name Dexiu (德秀), formally Lady Minghui of Yan (燕國明惠夫人), known in Southern Han as Princess Qingyuan (清遠公主), was the first (known) wife of Wang Yanjun, who carried the title of Prince of Min during her lifetime and (after her death) claimed the title of emperor. Her father was Liu Yin, the older brother of Southern Han's founding emperor Liu Yan (Emperor Gaozu).

== Historical references in written accounts ==
Very little was recorded about Liu Hua in traditional historical accounts — not even her name. Her marriage to Wang Yanjun was noted as being in 917, but she was incorrectly described as the daughter of Liu Yan. Her death date was not recorded, although she was described in the retrospective when Wang Yanjun, after declaring himself emperor, created an imperial consort, Chen Jinfeng, as empress in 935, implying that she was no longer alive at that point, and also described her as beautiful in contrast to the apparent ugly appearance that Empress Chen bore. Another retrospective statement about her indicated that she carried the title of Princess Qingyuan in Southern Han. Indeed, in the Spring and Autumn Annals of the Ten Kingdoms, her biography merely noted her princess title and the date of her marriage. (The author of the Spring and Autumn Annals of the Ten Kingdoms, Wu Renchen, noted thereafter those facts, "There is already a biography for her under Southern Han," apparently forgetting that he did not write a biography for her under the Southern Han section.)

== Tombstone ==
Liu Hua's tombstone, discovered in 1965, however, provided additional information on her, including her name and courtesy name, as well as the identification of her father as Liu Yan's older brother and predecessor Liu Yin rather than Liu Yan. (Her princess title, as well as the emperor titles that her uncle claimed and posthumously honored her father with, were not referenced, as Min was then a vassal of Later Tang, which Southern Han was no longer a vassal of.) She was described as Liu Yin's second daughter, and her mother was Lady Yan. Her death date, but not birthdate, was given, as was her age at death.

Lady Liu was described to have had four sons and two daughters — although it is unclear how many were actually her children, as Wang Yanjun's biological children by any other consort would have been legally considered her children as well. (Indeed, as indicated below, as the second son, Wang Jipeng, consistently had a higher position throughout Wang Yanjun's reign, including as described on the tombstone, than the oldest son, Wang Jiyan (王繼嚴), it might be an indicator that Wang Jipeng was her son while Wang Jiyan was born of a concubine.) The sons were listed, in order, as Wang Jiyan, Wang Jipeng, Wang Jitao (王繼韜), and Wang Jigong (王繼恭). The daughters were unnamed; one was described to be already of adult age, and one was described to be a child, at the time of her death.

== Notes and references ==
- Spring and Autumn Annals of the Ten Kingdoms (十國春秋), vol. 94.
- Zizhi Tongjian, vols. 270, 279

Chinese nobility
Preceded by Lady Cui	Lady consort of Min; 928–930	Succeeded by Lady Jin
