= Wuhan–Huangshi/Huanggang intercity railway =

Railway line in China

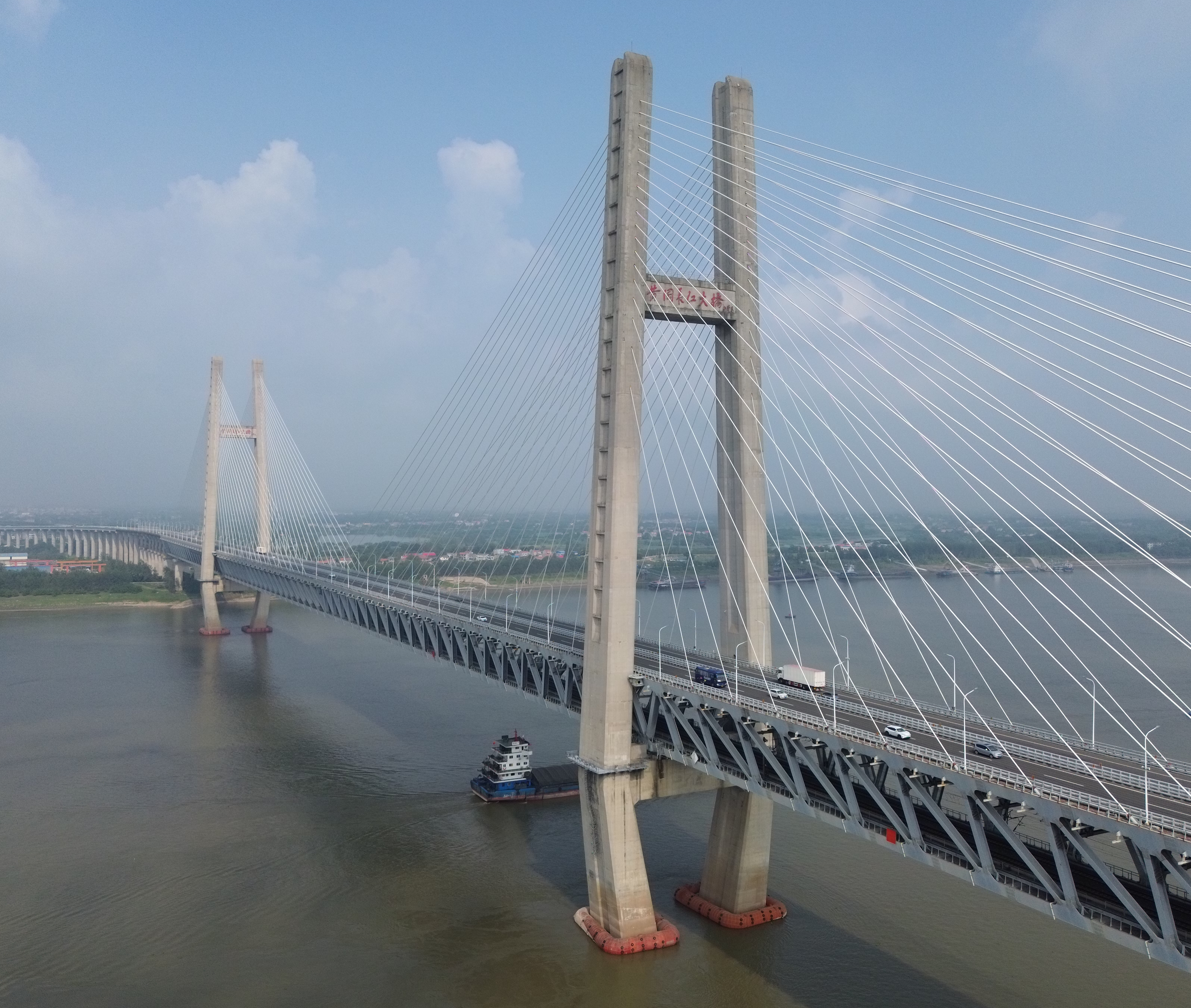
- Huanggang Yangtze River Bridge

Overview
- Status: Operational
- Termini: Wuhan; Daye North/Huanggang East
- Stations: 14

Service
- Type: High-speed rail
- System: China Railway
- Operator(s): CR Wuhan

Technical
- Line length: 131 km (81 mi); Wuhan–Huangshi: 95 km (59 mi); Gedian–Huanggang: 36 km (22 mi)
- Number of tracks: 2
- Track gauge: 1,435 mm (4 ft 8 1/2 in) standard gauge
- Operating speed: Wuhan–Daye North: 200 km/h (120 mph) and above Gedian South–Huanggang East: 200 km/h (120 mph)
- Signalling: ABS

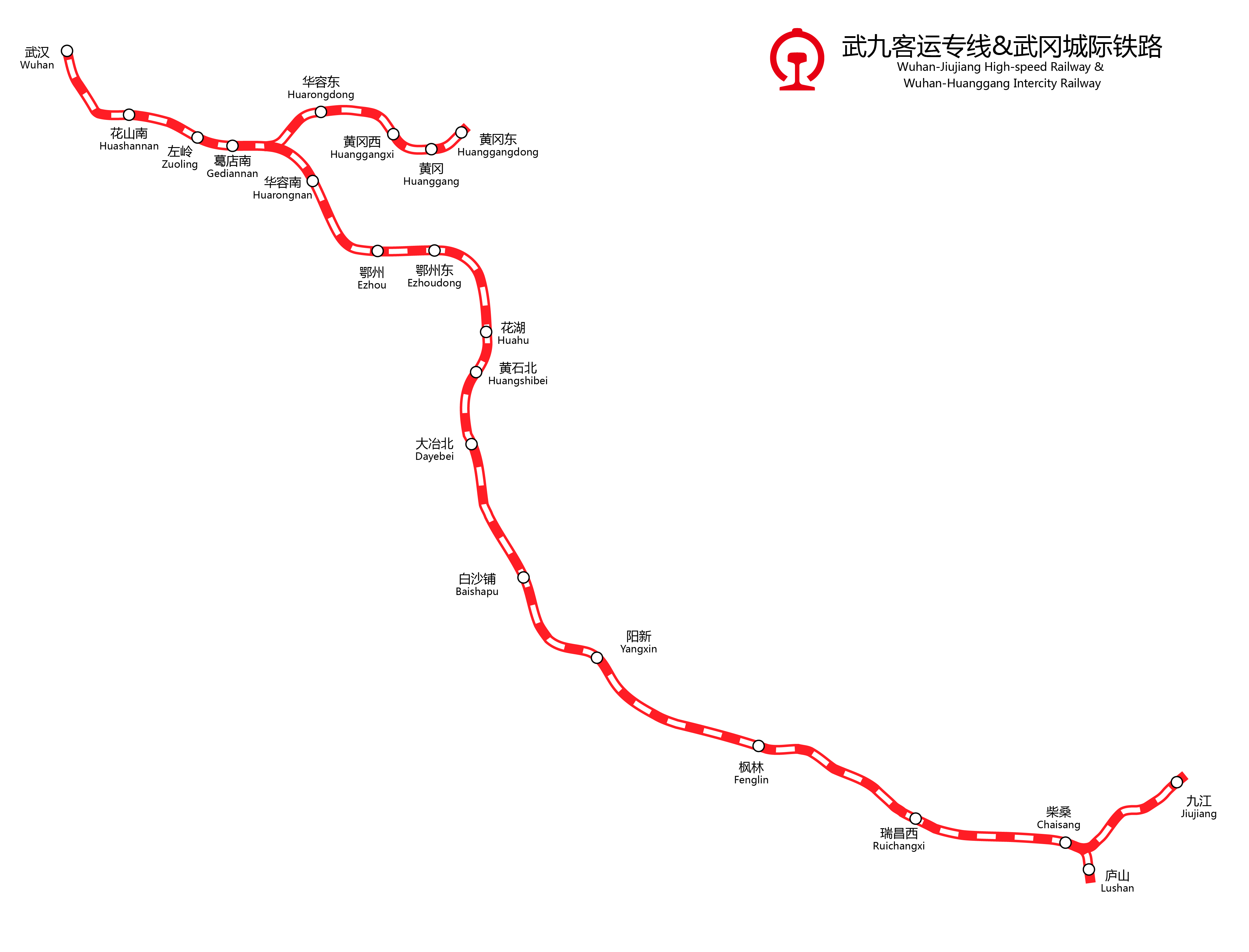
Map

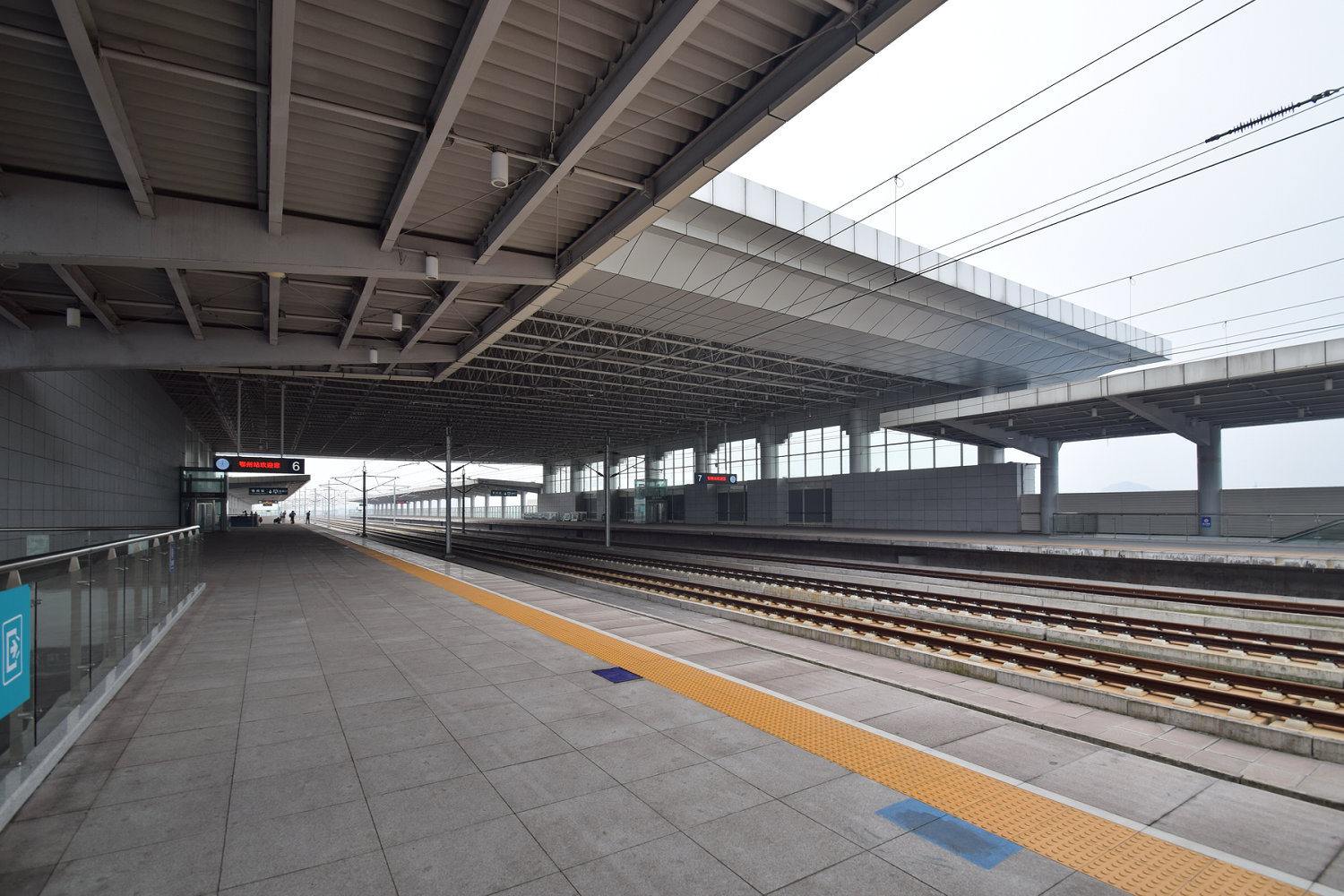
Ezhou station

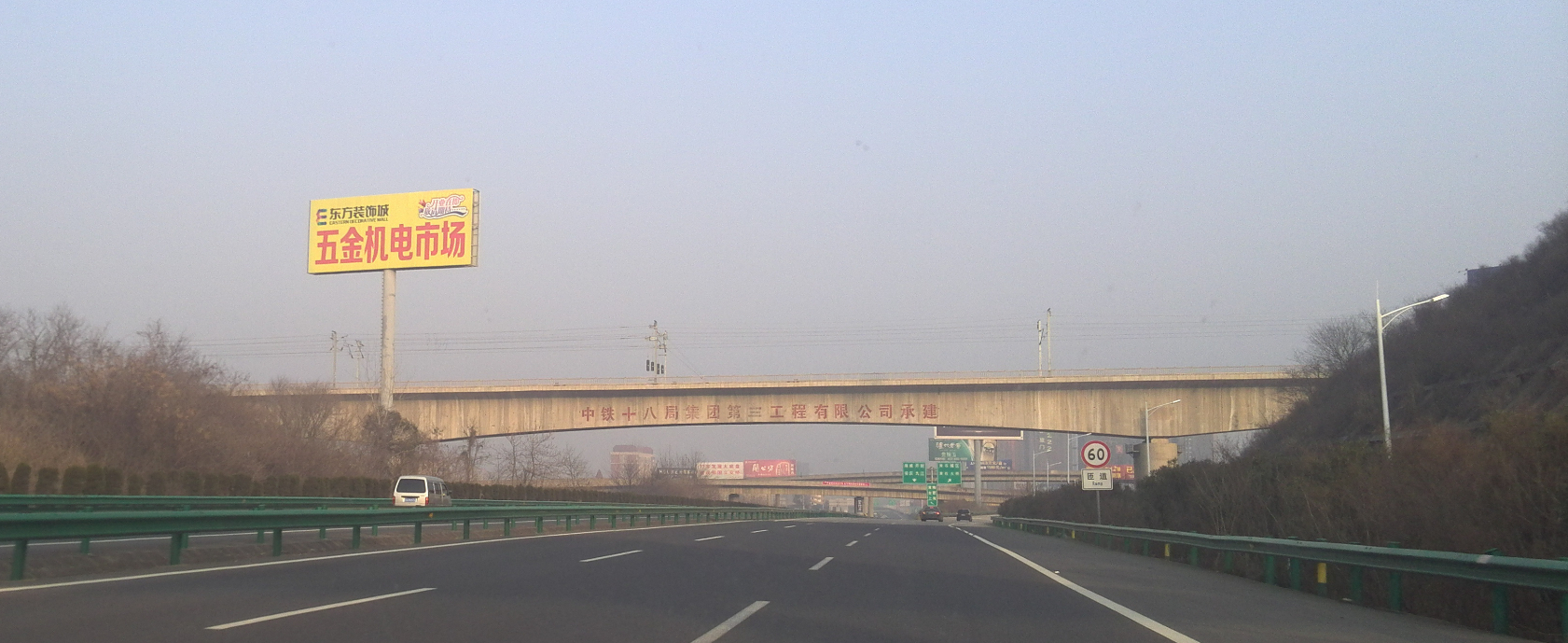
The Huahu section of the Wuhan–Huanggang intercity railway, a bridge over the shared section of the G45 Daqing–Guangzhou Expressway, the G50 Shanghai–Chongqing Expressway and the G70 Fuzhou–Yinchuan Expressway

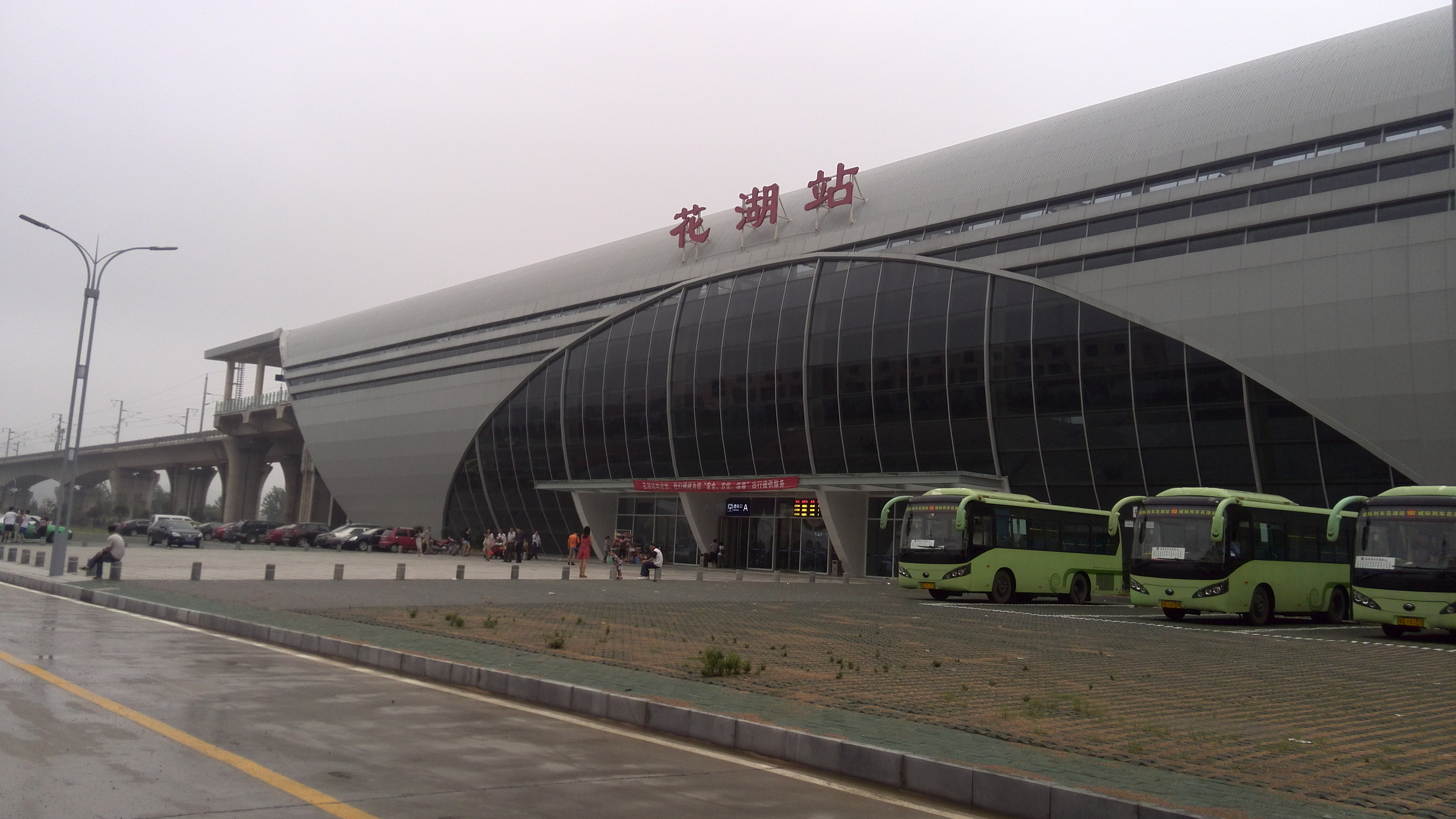
Huahu station

Huangshi North station

The Wuhan–Huangshi/Huanggang intercity railway (Chinese: 武黄城际铁路; pinyin: Wǔhuáng chéng jì tiělù) is the collective name for two intercity passenger lines in the Wuhan metropolitan area, the Wuhan–Huangshi intercity railway (Chinese: 武石城际铁路; pinyin: Wǔshí chéng jì tiělù) and the Wuhan–Huanggang intercity railway (Chinese: 武冈城际铁路; pinyin: Wǔgāng chéng jì tiělù). It connects Wuhan, Huangshi and Huanggang, and is an important part of the Wuhan Metropolitan Area intercity railway. The Wuhan–Huangshi line is the main line, and the Wuhan-Huanggang line branches from Gedian South station and is a branch line.

== Overview ==
The main line of Wuhan–Huangshi intercity railway branches off the Xiaomayang line of the Shekou–Wuhan railway on the south side of Wuhan station conventional yard, and it ends at Daye North station in Huangshi City. The main line is 97 km (60 mi)-long. It cost a total of 16.91 billion yuan to build and 71% of it consists of bridges or tunnel. There are 11 stations along the line, namely Wuhan, Nanhu East, Wuhan East, Huashan South, Zuoling, Gedian South, Huarong South, Ezhou, Ezhou East, Huahu, Huangshi North and Daye North.

The Wuhan–Huanggang intercity railway branch has four additional stations: Huarong East, Huanggang West, Huanggang and Huanggang East. It is 66 km (41 mi)-long and 67% of it consists of bridges or tunnel. The Wuhan–Huanggang ICR starts from Gedian South station of the Wuhan–Huangshi ICR, crosses the Huanggang Yangtze River Bridge near Sanjiangkou in Duandian Town, Ezhou City, enters Huangzhou district, passes Huanggang station, and finally arrives at Huanggang East Station. A connecting line is also planned between the Wuhan–Huangshi ICR and the Wuhan–Xianning ICR.

== History ==
In April 2008, relevant state ministries and commissions commissioned the Fourth Railway Survey and Design Institute and the Ministry of Railways Planning Department to jointly prepare a plan and propose the construction of a 1,085 km (674 mi) Wuhan Metropolitan Area intercity railway, with the Wuhan–Xiaogan and Wuhan–Huangshi lines being implemented first. In June 2008, the Hubei Provincial Development and Reform Commission, the Transportation Department, the Wuhan Railway Group, and the nine cities in the Metropolitan Area put forward their opinions and submitted the revised plan to the Ministry of Railways. In November 2008, the state officially approved the inclusion of the Wuhan Metropolitan Area intercity railway in the overall plan. This included the Wuhan–Huangshi ICR.

=== Construction started ===
The original plan was to complete the project and open to traffic by 31 December 2011, but construction was slowed down due to difficulties in obtaining loans and obstacles in relocation, and the construction period was repeatedly postponed. It was finally officially opened to traffic on 18 June 2014.

=== Public transportation operation ===
On 24 January 2024, the "New City Express" trains from Wuhan to Huanggang and Wuhan to Huangshi officially started operating as a public transport service. The earliest train from Wuhan East to Huanggang West departs at 7:42 and the latest train departs at 18:19; the earliest train from Huanggang West to Wuhan East departs at 7:06 and the latest train departs at 19:04. There are 13 round trips per day.

== Long-term planning ==
=== Wuhan–Huangshi intercity railway ===
The Wuhan–Huangshi ICR has been extended to Jiujiang in Jianzi province and will eventually form the Wuhan–Jiujiang HSR. The Jiangxi section of the project started construction at the end of 2013, and the Hubei section started construction at the end of 2014. The entire line was opened to traffic in September 2017. The new Wuhan–Jiujiang HSR from Daye North station to Lushan station has a total length of 112.22 km (69.73 mi) and a designed speed of 250 km/h (160 mph).

In the long-term plan, a new double track will be built between Wuhan and Huangshi, which will operate separately from the existing railway.

=== Wuhan–Huanggang intercity railway ===
The Wuhan–Huanggang intercity railway will connect to the Wuhan–Jiujiang HSR and on to the Beijing–Kowloon HSR. Among them, the Huanggang–Huangmei HSR between Huanggang and Huangmei started construction in December 2018 and will run from Huanggang East station, passing through Xishui, Qichun, Wuxue, Huangmei to Huangmei South Station of the Hefei–Jiujiang HSR. The total length is 122 km (76 mi), with an estimated investment of 14.7 billion yuan. It will be put into operation on 22 April 2022.
