= Lady Cui =

Chinese noble

Lady Cui (崔夫人), personal name might be Cui Lianshi (崔練師), was the wife of Wang Yanhan, a ruler of the Chinese Five Dynasties and Ten Kingdoms period state Min. She was said to be cruel, and was suspected of having poisoned Wang Yanhan's father and predecessor Wang Shenzhi (Prince Zhongyi of Min).

== Known life ==
Lady Cui was said to be of the prominent Cui clan of Boling (博陵, headquartered in modern Li county, Hebei). It is not known when she married Wang Yanhan, but it was before Wang Shenzhi's death (upon which Wang Yanhan took control of the Min realm), for she was suspected to have poisoned Wang Shenzhi while being Wang Yanhan's wife. She was said to be ugly, licentious, and jealous. However, she was also said to be a devout Buddhist who took, as her teacher in Buddhist doctrines, the monk Huileng (慧稜). (It was from her correspondence with Huileng, in which she referred to herself as "Lianshi," that one might believe that her name was Lianshi, although the historical accounts did not otherwise state a definitive name for her.)

While Wang Yanhan was ruling — but it was not completely clear whether this referred before or after his claiming the title of King of Min — he gathered many beautiful women to fill his palace. Lady Cui reacted by taking the most beautiful among these women and imprisoning them, binding them with chains and crafting wooden hands to slap them with. She also often bound her servant girls with ropes, and then whipping them until the ropes would be blood-stained. She also was known for piercing people's faces or arms with iron picks, such that within a single year, 34 people died from her torture. It was said that because of her cruelty, her dreams became haunted by images of her victims, such that she died in distress. (An alternative version of her death had it that she was struck by lightning.) It thus appeared that she predeceased Wang Yanhan, for he was killed by his adoptive brother Wang Yanbing, who captured him after a rebellion and then publicly declared that he and Lady Cui were in concert in poisoning Wang Shenzhi. (The succession table below assumes that she survived past Wang Yanhan's declaration of himself as King of Min, but that she died before his death; perhaps due to the shortness of his reign, he was not recorded to have given her (whether while alive or posthumously) a title as queen.)

== Notes and references ==
Chinese nobility
Preceded by Lady Ren Neiming	Lady consort of Min; 925–926?	Succeeded by Liu Hua
Preceded by Empress Liu of Later Tang	Consort to Sovereign of China (Fujian); 926?	Succeeded by Empress Cao of Later Tang
