= Li Chunyan =

Chinese empress

Li Chunyan (Chinese: 李春燕 or 李春鷰; died August 29, 939?) was an empress of the Chinese Five Dynasties and Ten Kingdoms Period state Min. Her husband was Wang Jipeng (also known as Wang Chang during his reign, Emperor Kangzong).

== Background ==
It is not known when or where Li Chunyan was born, and the traditional histories also gave no indication as to her family background. It is known that she became a lady in waiting in the palace of Wang Jipeng's father Wang Lin (né Wang Yanjun). She was said to be very beautiful, and at one point, Wang Jipeng, then the Prince of Fu, started an affair with her. In 935, he went to Wang Lin's wife (his stepmother), Empress Chen Jinfeng, asking for her help. Empress Chen spoke on his behalf, and Wang Lin gave Li Chunyan to him, albeit reluctantly. Wang Jipeng's younger brother Wang Jitao became displeased, and considered killing him — suggesting that Wang Jitao might have also had designs on her.

Later in 935, Wang Lin, Empress Chen, and Wang Jitao were killed in a coup that was led by the officer Li Fang (李倣) and Wang Jipeng. Wang Jipeng took the throne and changed his name to Wang Chang. He created Li Chunyan the imperial consort title Xianfei (賢妃), while his wife Lady Li only carried the title of Lady of Liang. He spent day and night with her, riding the same wagon and sitting on the same couch. His chancellor Ye Qiao tried to remind him that Lady Li was his wife and was of an honorable birth (as the daughter of his aunt and her husband, the chancellor Li Min (李敏)). Wang Chang did not listen, however, and eventually forced Ye into retirement.

== As empress ==
In 936, Wang Chang created Consort Li empress, at the same time that he honored his grandmother (Wang Lin's mother) Empress Dowager Huang grand empress dowager.

In 937, Wang built a new Ziwei Palace (紫微宮), adorned with crystals, with far greater effort going into its construction than even his father Wang Lin's opulent Baohuang Palace (寶皇宮). It became the palace where Empress Li would stay.

Meanwhile, Wang's favoring of a new elite corps of the imperial guard troops, the Chenwei Corps (宸衛), over two corps that his father Wang Lin had favored — the Gongchen (拱宸) and the Anhe (按鶴) — had caused much fear and anger among the ranks of those two corps, and he had also suspected one of their commanders, Lian Chongyu, of being complicit in the arson of the northern palace in 939, and thus considered killing Lian. Hearing of this, Lian started a coup later in 939, declared Wang Chang's uncle (Wang Lin's brother) Wang Yanxi emperor, forcing Wang Chang to flee. Wang Chang was captured in his flight, however, and killed by strangulation. It was said that Empress Li, his sons (it is not known whether they were by Empress Li, Lady Li, or other women), and his younger brother Wang Jigong (王繼恭) were also killed.

== Notes and references ==
- Spring and Autumn Annals of the Ten Kingdoms, vol. 94.
- Zizhi Tongjian, vols. 279, 280, 282.

Chinese nobility
Preceded by Lady Li (as wife of sovereign)	Empress of Min; 936–939	Succeeded by Empress Li (Wang Yanxi)
