= Lady Jin =

Lady Jin (Chinese: 金氏; personal name unknown) was the second known wife of Wang Yanjun (Emperor Huizong), a ruler of the Chinese Five Dynasties and Ten Kingdoms period state Min.

Very little was recorded in written history about her. Indeed, while her family name was given as Jin in the New History of the Five Dynasties and the Spring and Autumn Annals of the Ten Kingdoms, both the Spring and Autumn Annals of the Ten Kingdoms and the Zizhi Tongjian also inconsistently gave her family name as Liu, the same as his first wife Liu Hua.

As Lady Liu died in 930, Lady Jin would have married Wang Yanjun sometime thereafter, while he would have carried the title of Prince of Min as a nominal vassal to Later Tang. Lady Jin was described to be virtuous, but not favored by Wang Yanjun. After he declared himself as Emperor of Min, independent of Later Tang, in 933, he was not initially described to have created anyone empress. However, as he came to favor his concubine Consort Chen Jinfeng, in 935 he created Consort Chen empress, bypassing Lady Jin. It was said that particularly after Empress Chen's creation, Lady Jin lost whatever remaining favor she had, and nothing further was known about what happened to her.

== Notes and references ==
Chinese nobility
Preceded by Liu Hua	Lady ccnsort of Min; 930?–935	Succeeded by Empress Chen Jinfeng
Preceded by Empress Cao of Later Tang	Consort to the Sovereign of China (Fujian); 933–935	Succeeded by Empress Chen Jinfeng
