= Wuhan–Jiujiang high-speed railway =

Railway line in China

Wuhan–Jiujiang passenger railway
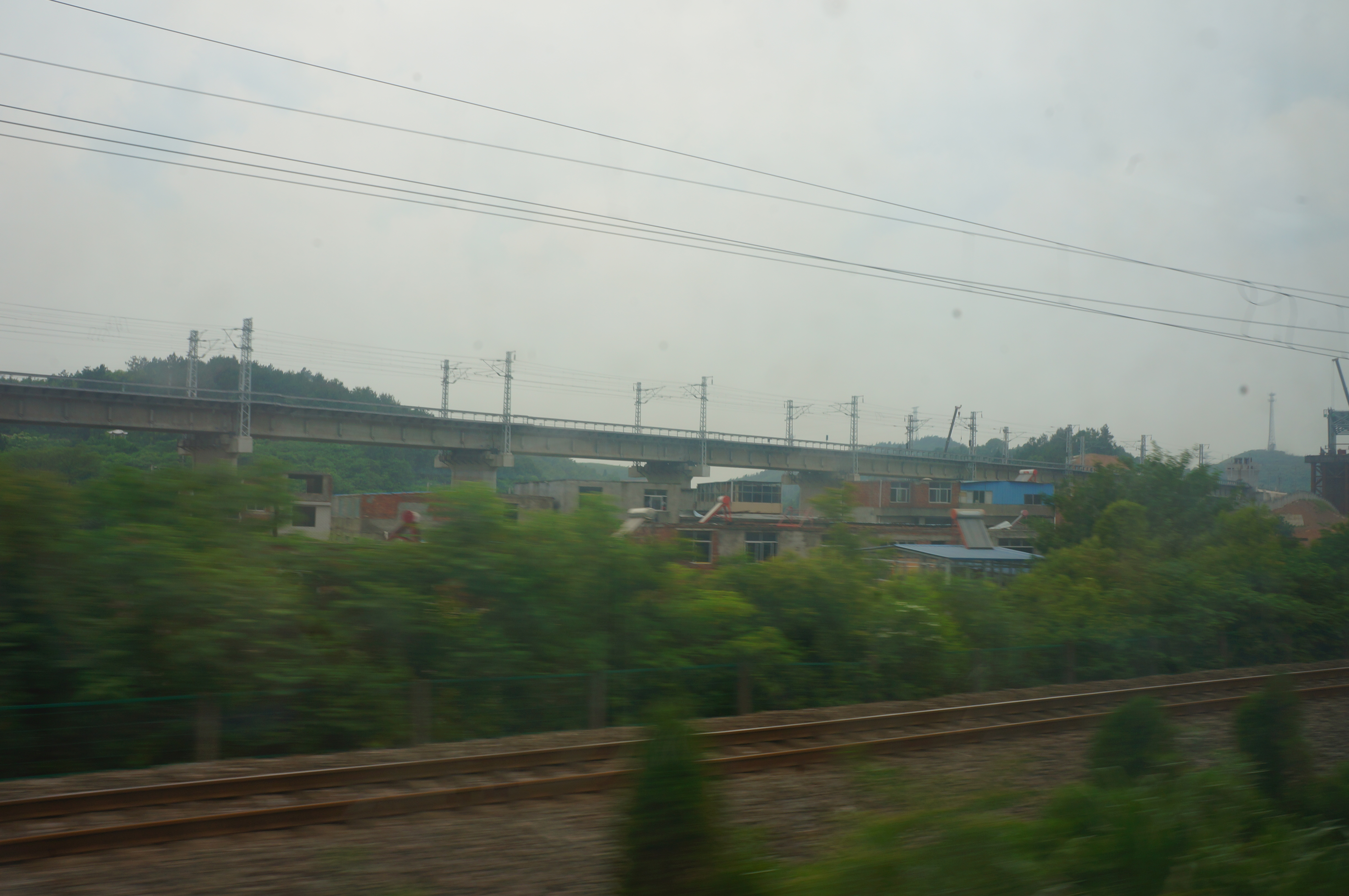

Overview
- Native name: 武九客运专线
- Status: Operational
- Owner: CR Wuhan; CR Nanchang
- Locale: Hubei province Jiangxi province
- Termini: Wuhan; Jiujiang
- Stations: 17

Service
- Type: High-speed rail
- System: China Railway High-speed
- Operator(s): CR Wuhan; CR Nanchang

History
- Opened: September 21, 2017; 7 years ago

Technical
- Number of tracks: 2 (Double-track)
- Track gauge: 1,435 mm (4 ft 8 1/2 in) standard gauge
- Electrification: 25 kV 50 Hz AC (Overhead line)
- Operating speed: 250 km/h (160 mph)

The Wuhan–Jiujiang high-speed railway is a high-speed railway line in China's Hubei Province and Jiangxi Province, eastern China. The Jiangxi section and Hubei section of the line started construction at the end of 2013 and 2014 respectively, and the entire line was opened to traffic on 21 September 2017.

== Overview ==
The Wuhan to Daye North section shares the same line with the Wuhan–Huangshan intercity railway, continuing from Daye North station as a new line ending at Jiujiang station. The railway is a Class I double-track electrified railway with a design speed of 250 km/h (160 mph). The railway connects to the Nanchang–Jiujiang ICR and Nanchang–Fuzhou railway in the southeast, forming a national main line connecting the central region and the southeast coastal region; it connects to the Jiujiang–Quzhou railway in the east, forming a fast line connecting the central and eastern regions.

The opening of the Wuhan–Jiujiang HSR was expected to reduce the travel time from Wuhan to Jiujiang from four hours to one hour, and the travel time from Wuhan to Nanchang from two hours and 40 minutes to 1.5 hours.

== Construction ==
On 18 June 2014, the Wuhan-Huangshan intercity railway (from Wuhan Station to Daye North Station), part of the Wuhan–Jiujiang HSR, was opened to traffic.

In December 2014, construction of the rest of the Hubei section (from Daye North to the Hubei–Jiangxi border) began. The main line is 69.124 km (42.952 mi)-long and has four stations: Daye North, Baishapu, Yangxin and Fenglin. The estimated total construction cost was RMB 7.383 billion and the construction period was expected to be three years.

On 21 September 2017, the Yangxin to Jiujiang section was opened for operation. All the EMU trains that originally passed over the Wuhan–Jiujiang railway were rerouted over the Wuhan–Jiujiang HSR. The first train was the G488 train from Nanchang West to Beijing West. The train was printed with a sticker that read "Great China".
