= Huangchuan County =

Huangchuan County 潢川县 Hwangchwan
- County
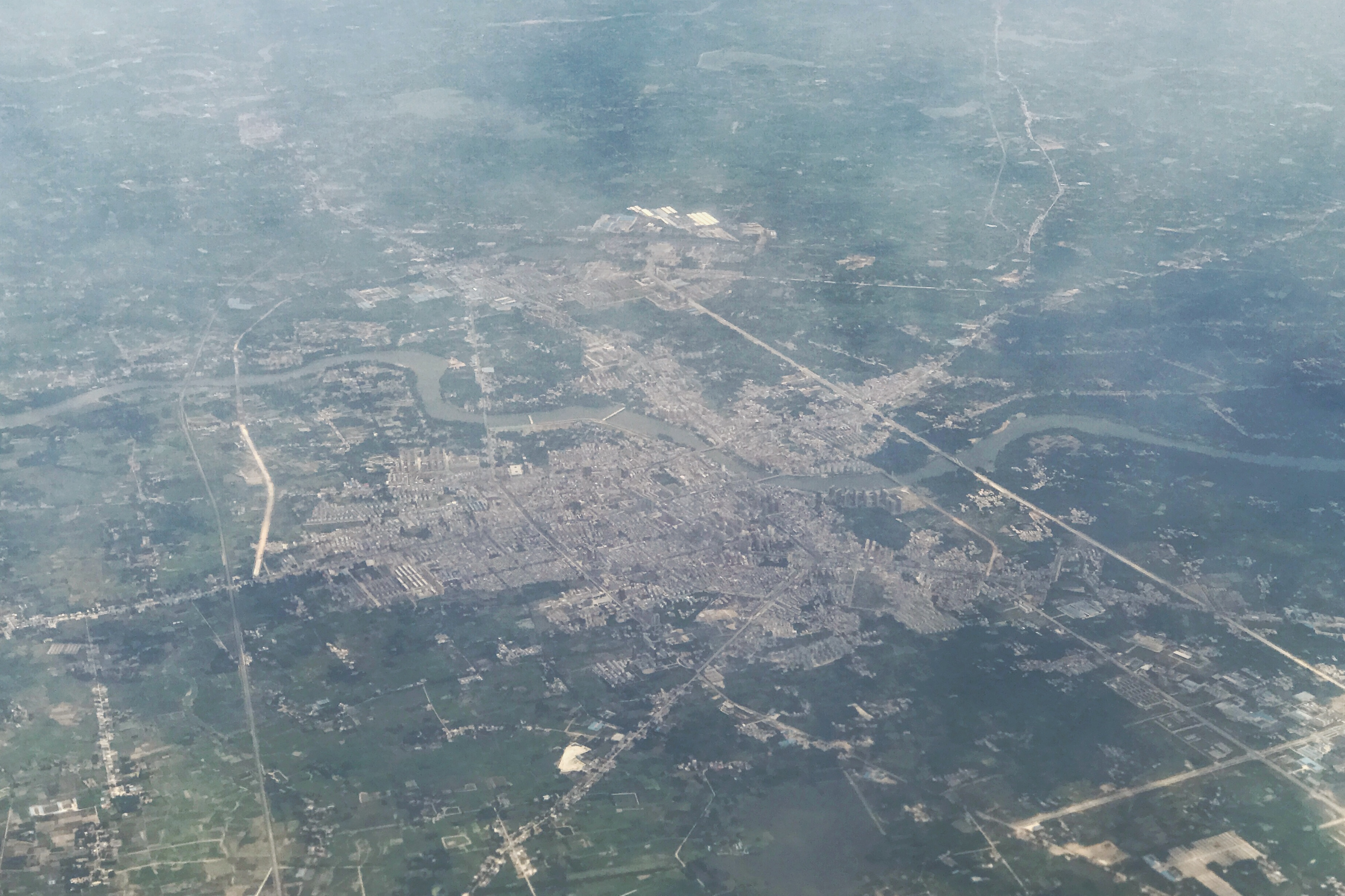
- Aerial view of Huangchuan

- Location in Henan
- Coordinates: 32°08′13″N 115°02′52″E
- Country: People's Republic of China
- Province: Henan
- Prefecture-level city: Xinyang
- Settled: c. 21st century BC
- Yiyang County: 206 BC
- Guangzhou: 712 AD
- Huangchuan: 1913 AD

Government
  - Secretary: vacancy (CPC)
  - Magistrate: Zhao Liang

Area
  - County: 1,638 km^{2} (632 sq mi)
  - Water: 107 km^{2} (41 sq mi)
  - Metro: 33.4 km^{2} (12.9 sq mi)

Dimensions
  - Length: 53 km (33 mi)
  - Width: 44.5 km (27.7 mi)
- Elevation: 45 m (148 ft)
- Highest elevation: 330 m (1,080 ft)
- Lowest elevation: 30 m (98 ft)

Population (2019)
  - County: 676,500
  - Density: 413.0/km^{2} (1,070/sq mi)
  - Metro: 280,000
  - Metro density: 8,400/km^{2} (22,000/sq mi)
- Time zone: UTC+8 (China Standard)
- Postal code: 465150
- Area code: 376
- ISO 3166 code: CN-41-11-25
- Licence plate prefix: 豫S3
- Website: www.huangchuan.gov.cn

Huangchuan County (simplified Chinese: 潢川县; traditional Chinese: 潢川縣; pinyin: Huángchuān Xiàn; local pronunciation: Huāngcuǎn Xiàn) is a county of southeastern Henan province, People's Republic of China. It is located in the center of Xinyang City, straddling the Huang River.

The 13th five-year plan of Xinyang City proposes to support the withdrawal of Huangchuan County to apply for the construction of Guangzhou City, build a sub central city in the city area, and accelerate the integrated development of Huangchuan and Guangshan.

== History ==
=== Origin and early development ===
Huang is briefly mentioned in the Bamboo Annals during the reign of King Xiang. Later, during the Zhou dynasty, a state called Huang appears once again in textual and archeological records, with its capital at Huangchuan. This state is considered to be the root origin of the ancient Chinese surname Huang (or Hwang). Huang was later invaded and annexed by the Kingdom of Chu in 648 BCE, during the Spring and Autumn period.

Remains of the capital of Huang were discovered in Longgu, a township six kilometers northwest to the urban area of Huangchuan.

=== Imperial period ===
After the Qin dynasty. Huangchuan was generally established as a zhou, a commandery or a county.

According to Brief Sketch of North Parts of Ming Dynasty (Chinese: 明季北略), a book by Ji Liuqi (计六奇) recording the transitional period from the Ming dynasty to the Qing dynasty, Huangchuan (then Guangzhou) was devastated and the residents massacred by the peasant army. And now residents in Huangchuan are mainly descendants of migrants from Jiangxi, Fujian and Guangdong settled down during the Kangxi era in the Qing dynasty.

=== Republic period ===
In 1913, Huangchuan was renamed to its current name.

In 2009, Huang-Guang Integration project was launched aiming to integrate Huangchuan County and neighboring Guangshan County.

=== Former names ===
- traditional Chinese: 黃國; simplified Chinese: 黄国; pinyin: Huángguó, the surname Huang (黃) is derived from this state
- traditional Chinese: 弋陽; simplified Chinese: 弋阳; pinyin: Yìyáng
- Chinese: 定城; pinyin: Dìngchéng
- Chinese: 光州; pinyin: Guāngzhōu

== Geography ==
Huangchuan borders the Huai River in the north, which is regarded as part of the geographical dividing line between North China and South China.

Huang River, a tributary of Huai River, is pronounced the same as Yellow River yet with different characters. Local residents usually call it Little Huang River (pinyin: Xiǎo Huáng Hé).

The annual mean temperature is 15.3 °C (59.5 °F) and precipitation averages 1,039 millimetres (40.9 in).

== Climate ==
Climate data for Huangchuan, elevation 43 m (141 ft), (1991–2020 normals, extremes 1981–present)
Month	Jan	Feb	Mar	Apr	May	Jun	Jul	Aug	Sep	Oct	Nov	Dec	Year
Record high °C (°F)	21.5 (70.7)	27.5 (81.5)	34.9 (94.8)	34.4 (93.9)	36.7 (98.1)	38.4 (101.1)	39.7 (103.5)	39.0 (102.2)	38.2 (100.8)	33.6 (92.5)	29.0 (84.2)	22.6 (72.7)	39.7 (103.5)
Mean daily maximum °C (°F)	7.0 (44.6)	10.3 (50.5)	15.8 (60.4)	22.3 (72.1)	27.0 (80.6)	29.8 (85.6)	32.1 (89.8)	31.1 (88.0)	27.5 (81.5)	22.4 (72.3)	15.9 (60.6)	9.5 (49.1)	20.9 (69.6)
Daily mean °C (°F)	2.6 (36.7)	5.5 (41.9)	10.6 (51.1)	16.8 (62.2)	22.0 (71.6)	25.5 (77.9)	28.0 (82.4)	26.9 (80.4)	22.6 (72.7)	17.1 (62.8)	10.7 (51.3)	4.8 (40.6)	16.1 (61.0)
Mean daily minimum °C (°F)	−0.7 (30.7)	1.9 (35.4)	6.5 (43.7)	12.1 (53.8)	17.6 (63.7)	21.9 (71.4)	24.7 (76.5)	23.8 (74.8)	19.0 (66.2)	13.1 (55.6)	6.8 (44.2)	1.3 (34.3)	12.3 (54.2)
Record low °C (°F)	−15.7 (3.7)	−16.0 (3.2)	−5.1 (22.8)	0.0 (32.0)	6.0 (42.8)	12.7 (54.9)	18.1 (64.6)	14.6 (58.3)	9.5 (49.1)	1.5 (34.7)	−6.2 (20.8)	−15.0 (5.0)	−16.0 (3.2)
Average precipitation mm (inches)	33.7 (1.33)	40.0 (1.57)	66.2 (2.61)	80.5 (3.17)	110.9 (4.37)	166.4 (6.55)	213.4 (8.40)	136.5 (5.37)	70.8 (2.79)	66.8 (2.63)	49.7 (1.96)	26.1 (1.03)	1,061 (41.78)
Average precipitation days (≥ 0.1 mm)	7.5	8.3	9.1	8.6	10.8	10.1	11.7	11.6	8.9	8.7	8.0	6.3	109.6
Average snowy days	5.1	3.1	1.2	0	0	0	0	0	0	0	0.7	1.8	11.9
Average relative humidity (%)	74	73	70	69	71	77	80	83	79	75	74	72	75
Mean monthly sunshine hours	108.5	113.0	147.5	176.8	183.4	173.8	192.3	176.5	150.4	143.8	132.7	121.9	1,820.6
Percentage possible sunshine	34	36	40	45	43	41	45	43	41	41	42	39	41
Source: China Meteorological Administrationall-time July High

== Administrative divisions ==
Huangchuan County currently has 4 subdistricts, 9 towns and 8 townships. The county was reorganized in 2005, when the townships of Xiaoludian (小吕店乡) and Pengjiadian (彭家店乡), and the town of Niugang (牛岗镇) were assimilated into neighboring towns and townships.

=== Subdistricts ===
- Chunshen Subdistrict (春申街道)
- Dingcheng Subdistrict (定城街道)
- Yiyang Subdistrict (弋阳街道)
- Laocheng Subdistrict (老城街道)

=== Towns ===
- Shuangliushu (双柳树镇)
- Sanpisi (伞陂寺镇)
- Butaji (卜塔集镇)
- Renhe (仁和镇)
- Fudian (傅店镇)
- Xuezi (踅孜镇)
- Taolinpu (桃林铺镇)
- Huangsigang (黄寺岗镇)
- Jiangjiaji (江家集镇)

=== Townships ===
- Chuanliudian Township (传流店乡)
- Weigang Township (魏岗乡)
- Zhangji Township (张集乡)
- Lailong Township (来龙乡)
- Longgu Township (隆古乡)
- Tandian Township (谈店乡)
- Shangyougang Township (上油岗乡)
- Baidian Township (白店乡)

== Transport ==
- China National Highway 106 (G106)
- China National Highway 312 (G312)
- G40 Shanghai–Xi'an Expressway
- G45 Daqing–Guangzhou Expressway
- Huangchuan railway station
