= Guāng Prefecture =

Prefecture in Henan, China

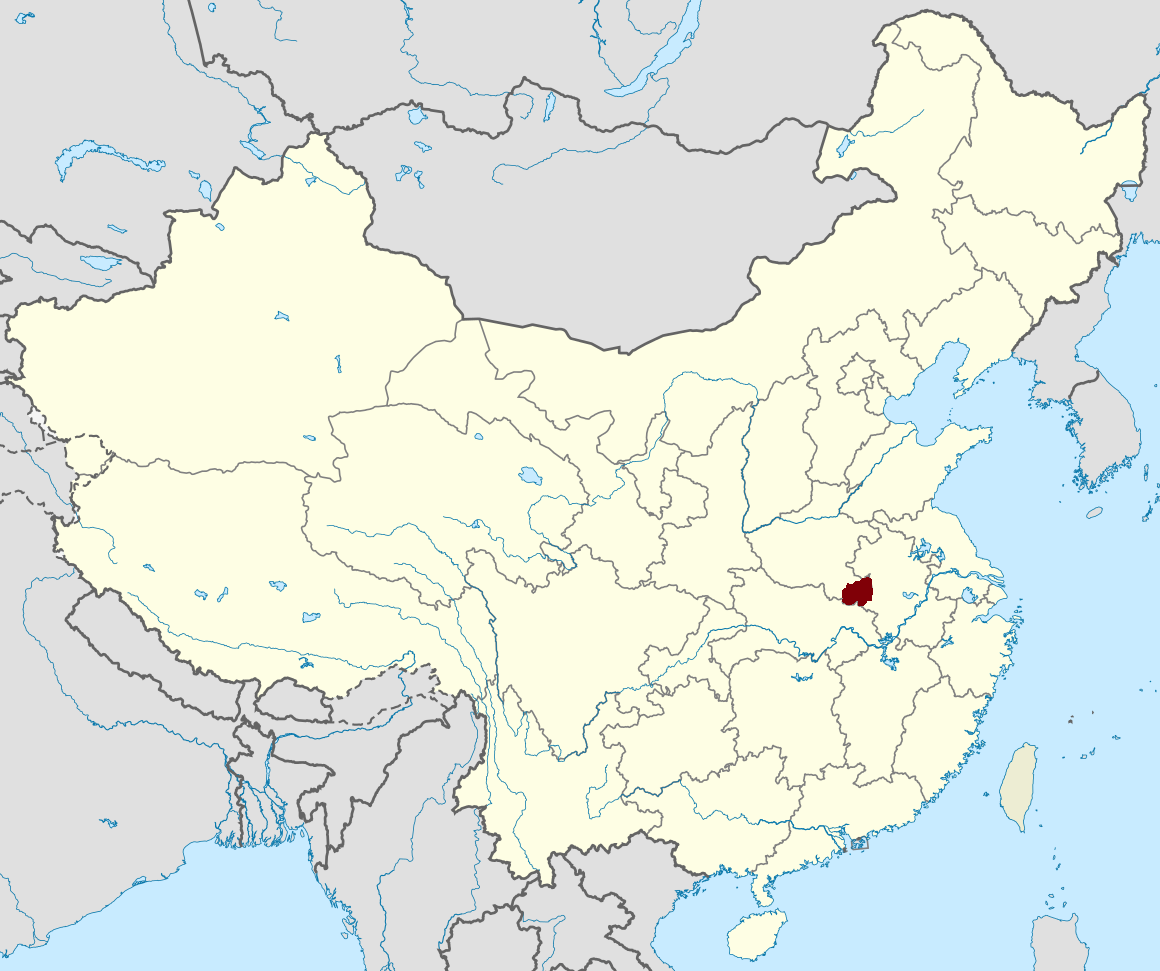
- Chinese: 光州
Transcriptions
Standard Mandarin
- Hanyu Pinyin: Guāngzhōu
- Wade–Giles: Kuang^{1}-chou^{1}

Guang Prefecture (光州) was a prefecture of imperial China centered on modern Huangchuan County, Henan. It was created in the 6th century under the Liang dynasty during the Southern dynasties era and existed intermittently until 1913, after the establishment of the Republic.

== Geography ==
The administrative region of Guangzhou in the Tang dynasty is in the border area between modern southeastern Henan and western Anhui (as well as northeastern Hubei). It probably includes parts of modern:

- Under the administration of Xinyang, Henan:
  - Huangchuan County
  - Guangshan County
  - Xin County
  - Shangcheng County
  - Gushi County
- Under the administration of Lu'an, Anhui:
  - Jinzhai County
