= Huanggang–Huangmei high-speed railway =

High-speed rail line in China

Overview
- Status: Operating
- Termini: Huanggang East; Huangmei East

Service
- Operator(s): China Railway Wuhan Group

History
- Opened: 22 April 2022

Technical
- Line length: 125 km (78 mi)
- Track gauge: 1,435 mm (4 ft 8 1/2 in)
- Operating speed: 350 km/h (217 mph)

The Huanggang–Huangmei high-speed railway (Chinese: 黄黄高速铁路) is a high-speed railway line in Hubei, China. It is part of the Beijing–Hong Kong (Taipei) corridor and have a design speed of 350 kilometres per hour (220 mph).

== History ==
Construction on the line officially began in December 2018. It had been expected to open by the end of 2021. It actually opened on 22 April 2022.

== Stations ==
- (Through service to Wuhan via Wuhan–Huanggang intercity railway)
- Huanggang East
- Xishui South
- Qichun South
- Wuxue North
- Huangmei East
