= Wang Yanhan =

King of Min from 926 to 927

King Si of Min 閩嗣王

King of Great Min (大閩國王)
- Reign: November 13, 926 – January 14, 927
- Predecessor: Wang Shenzhi
- Successor: Wang Yanjun

Jiedushi of Weiwu Circuit (威武軍節度使)
- Tenure: November 13, 926 – January 14, 927 (Acting: December 30, 925 – November 13, 926)
- Predecessor: Wang Shenzhi
- Successor: Wang Yanhan
- Born: unknown
- Died: January 14, 927
- Burial: in modern Jin'an District, Fuzhou
Full name
- Family name: Wáng (王); Given name: Yánhàn (延翰)
Era name and dates
- Tiancheng (天成) (adopted the Later Tang's era name): 926
Posthumous name
- King Si (嗣王)
- House: Wang
- Dynasty: Min

Wang Yanhan (Chinese: 王延翰) (died January 14, 927), courtesy name Ziyi (子逸), also known by his posthumous name as the King Si of Min (閩嗣王), was a ruler of Min during the Five Dynasties and Ten Kingdoms period of China. He ruled briefly after the death of his father Wang Shenzhi (Prince Zhongyi) without a regal title, but later declared himself king. Just two months after declaring himself king, he was overthrown and killed in a revolt by his adoptive brother Wang Yanbing and younger biological brother Wang Yanjun. Wang Yanjun took over the state thereafter.

== Background ==
Perhaps because of the briefness of his reign and his eventual fate, little is known about Wang Yanhan's person prior to his reign, including who his mother was or when he was born. It is known that he was the oldest son of Wang Shenzhi the Prince of Min, and that, at least by 925, he was carrying the title of deputy military governor of Weiwu Circuit (威武, headquartered in modern Fuzhou, Fujian) — as his father Wang Shenzhi, at that time, had, among his titles, the title of military governor (Jiedushi) of Weiwu, as a vassal of Later Tang. It was said that Wang Yanhan was handsome, tall, and studious.

When Wang Shenzhi fell ill in summer 925, he had Wang Yanhan take over the affairs of the state. When Wang Shenzhi died later in 925, Wang Yanhan took over the state, but initially did not declare any regal titles, but instead only the title of acting military governor of Weiwu. (A rumor at that time — later claimed to be true by Wang Yanhan's adoptive brother Wang Yanbing — was that Wang Shenzhi was poisoned by Wang Yanhan's wife Lady Cui, but it cannot be known whether the rumor was true.)

== As military governor of Weiwu ==
An immediate crisis that Wang Yanhan had to deal with in the aftermaths of Wang Shenzhi's death was that at the same time, one Chen Ben (陳本), from Ting Prefecture (汀州, in modern Longyan, Fujian) rose against his rule, gathered 30,000 men, and besieged Ting Prefecture. Wang sent his general Liu Yong (柳邕) with 20,000 men to attack Chen. By spring 926, Liu had defeated and killed Chen, ending his rebellion.

Meanwhile, then-reigning emperor of Later Tang, Emperor Zhuangzong, had heard of Wang Yanhan's succession, and bestowed on Wang Yanhan the title of military governor of Weiwu, but shortly after, Emperor Zhuangzong himself was killed in a mutiny. Emperor Zhuangzong was succeeded by his adoptive brother Emperor Mingzong, who confirmed the commission and further gave Wang the honorary chancellor title of Tong Zhongshu Menxia Pingzhangshi (同中書門下平章事).

== As king ==
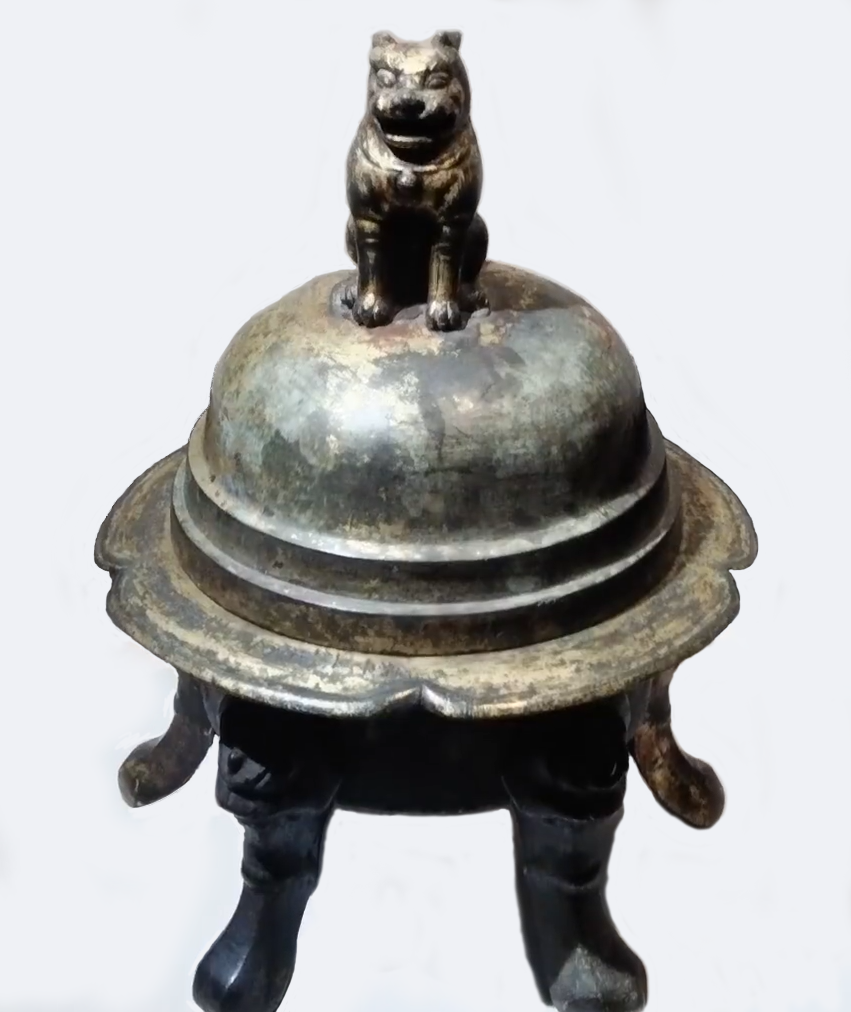
The bronze gilt lion-shaped incense burner of Wang Yanhan, King of Min. It is housed in the Fujian Museum.

However, despite these honors granted him by the Later Tang imperial court, Wang Yanhan, who was described to be arrogant and violent by this point, declared himself King of Min in winter 926. He also established a government in the form of an imperial government, referred to his residence as a palace, and declared a general pardon, thus in effect declared independence from Later Tang (as those were all trappings of an emperor), although there was no record of him declaring an era name independent of Later Tang's.

Wang was said to be distant from his brothers, and shortly after he took over control of the state, sent his younger brother Wang Yanjun out of the capital Fu Prefecture to be the prefect of Quan Prefecture (泉州, in modern Quanzhou, Fujian). Further, he was gathering many women among his people to fill his palace. Both Wang Yanjun and an adoptive brother, Wang Yanbing, who was then the prefect of Jian Prefecture (建州, in modern Nanping, Fujian), both advised him against it, but he refused to listen, causing friction between him and both of those brothers. Around the new year 927, Wang Yanbing and Wang Yanjun jointly attacked Fu Prefecture. Wang Yanbing arrived first and defeated Wang Yanhan's general Chen Tao (陳陶), causing Chen to commit suicide. That night, Wang Yanbing took his soldiers, scaled the walls of the city, and entered, capturing Wang Yanhan. Wang Yanbing publicly accused Wang Yanhan of crimes, including murdering their father Wang Shenzhi along with Lady Cui, and executed him. When Wang Yanjun arrived shortly later, Wang Yanbing supported him to be the new acting military governor of Weiwu.

== Notes and references ==
- Old History of the Five Dynasties, vol. 134.
- New History of the Five Dynasties, vol. 68.
- Spring and Autumn Annals of the Ten Kingdoms (十國春秋), vol. 91.
- Zizhi Tongjian, vols. 273, 274, 275.

Preceded by None (title first claimed)	King of Min; 926–927	Succeeded by Wang Yanjun (Emperor Huizong)
Preceded by Wang Shenzhi (Prince Zhongyi)	Ruler of China (Fujian) (de facto); 925–927	Succeeded by Wang Yanjun (Emperor Huizong)
Preceded by Li Siyuan of Later Tang	Ruler of China (Fujian) (de jure); 926–927	Succeeded by Li Siyuan of Later Tang
