= Wang Yanbing =

Adoptive son of Wang Shenzhi (died 931)

Wang Yanbing (王延稟) (died 931), né Zhou Yanchen (周彥琛), formally Prince Weisu of Wuping (武平威肅王), was an adoptive son of Wang Shenzhi (commonly considered the founding ruler of the Chinese Five Dynasties and Ten Kingdoms Period state Min). After Wang Shenzhi's death and succession by Wang Shenzhi's biological son Wang Yanhan, Wang Yanbing, jointly with another biological son of Wang Shenzhi's, Wang Yanjun, overthrew Wang Yanhan to allow Wang Yanjun to rule Min. However, he later developed a rivalry with Wang Yanjun and tried to overthrow Wang Yanjun. His army was defeated by Wang Yanjun's, and he was captured and executed.

== Background ==
It is not known when Wang Yanbing was born. It is also not known what his birth family's background was, other than that he was originally named Zhou Yanchen, or how and when he came to become an adoptive son of Wang Shenzhi's. One of his eyes was deformed or injured, such that he became known by a nickname of "single-eyed dragon" (獨眼龍). In 918, when Wang Shenzhi had already assumed the title of the Prince of Min as a vassal of Later Liang, Wang Yanbing was initially provisionally put in charge of the governance of Jian Prefecture (建州, in modern Nanping, Fujian), and later officially made its prefect.

== During Wang Yanhan's rule ==
Wang Shenzhi died in 925. His biological son Wang Yanhan took over the realm and, in 926, declared himself the King of Min, effectively declaring independence from Later Liang's successor state Later Tang. It was said that he did not value his relationships with brothers and, shortly after taking over from Wang Shenzhi, sent a younger brother, Wang Yanjun, out of the capital Fu Prefecture (福州, in modern Fuzhou, Fujian) to be the prefect of Quan Prefecture (泉州, in modern Quanzhou, Fujian). He subsequently issued orders to both Wang Yanjun and Wang Yanbing, ordering them to find beautiful women to serve in his palace. Both Wang Yanjun and Wang Yanbing wrote back in rebuke, thus causing tension between them and him. Around the new year 927, Wang Yanjun and Wang Yanbing decided to jointly attack him. Heading down the Min River from Jian, Wang Yanbing reached Fu first, and defeated Wang Yanhan's general Chen Tao (陳陶). Chen committed suicide, and the city fell. Claiming that Wang Yanhan and his wife Lady Cui had murdered Wang Shenzhi by poison, he had Wang Yanhan publicly executed. Wang Yanjun arrived the next day, and Wang Yanbing welcomed him into the city and supported him as the acting military governor of Weiwu Circuit (威武, headquartered at Fu Prefecture, i.e., the Min realm). (Thus, de jure, Min thus stopped being independent by this point and reverted to be a vassal of Later Tang, but was still de facto independent.)

== During Wang Yanjun's rule ==
Shortly after, when Wang Yanbing was set to return to Jian, Wang Yanjun sent him off. As they were departing, Wang Yanbing stated to Wang Yanjun, "Carefully guard the base of our ancestors' accomplishments. Do not trouble me, your older brother, to come down again!" Wang Yanjun thanked him with humble words, but had a changed expression upon hearing the words.

At some point, apparently at Wang Yanjun's request (after Later Tang's emperor Li Siyuan had bestowed the title of military governor of Weiwu on Wang Yanjun himself), Li Siyuan bestowed the title of military governor of Fengguo Circuit (奉國, traditionally headquartered in modern Zhumadian, Henan, which was then part of Later Tang proper) on Wang Yanbing. (The bestowment of the title was not itself recorded as having been Wang Yanjun's request, nor was its timing recorded in traditional histories, but the chronicle of Li Siyuan's reign in the History of the Five Dynasties recorded a subsequent bestowment of an additional honorific chancellor title of Shizhong on Wang Yanbing at Wang Yanjun's request in 929.) Apparently just a month after receiving the Shizhong title, Wang Yanbing, apparently in a show of authority independent from Wang Yanjun's, directly petitioned Li Siyuan, requesting to retire on account of illness and that his territory be passed to his oldest son Wang Jixiong (王繼雄). Li Siyuan granted the request and made Wang Jixiong the prefect of Jian.

In 931, hearing that Wang Yanjun was ill, Wang Yanbing launched an army and attacked Fu with Wang Jixiong, leaving his second son Wang Jisheng (王繼昇) in charge at Jian. Wang Yanbing attacked Fu from the west side while Wang Jixiong attacked Fu from the east side. A nephew of Wang Yanjun's and Wang Yanbing's, Wang Renda (王仁達), pretended to surrender to Wang Jixiong, and when Wang Jixiong was not paying attention, killed him and hanged his head high. When Wang Yanbing saw his son's head, he broke into tears, and his army collapsed. Wang Renda then attacked and captured him, presenting him to Wang Yanjun. Wang Yanjun stated to him, "Indeed, I have troubled you, older brother, into coming down again." Wang Yanbing could not respond, and Wang Yanjun then put him under arrest and sent emissaries to Jian, trying to persuade Wang Yanbing's associates there to peacefully submit. Wang Yanbing's associates, however, killed Wang Yanjun's emissaries, and then escorted Wang Jisheng and a younger son of Wang Yanbing's, Wang Jilun (王繼倫), to flee to Min's northern neighbor Wuyue. Wang Yanjun subsequently publicly executed Wang Yanbing and changed his name back to Zhou Yanchen, effectively disowning him as a family member.

== Posthumous recognition ==
However, two years later, in 933, Wang Yanjun built a temple dedicated to Wang Yanbing (and, presumably, restored his name and status as a family member), for reasons lost to history. He also posthumously created Wang Yanbing the Prince of Lingzhao. In 943, by which time Wang Yanbing's successor at Jian, Wang Yanzheng (another biological son of Wang Shenzhi's), then in rivalry with then-Min emperor Wang Yanxi, declared himself emperor of a new state of Yin, he further posthumously honored Wang Yanbing Prince Weisu of Wuping.

== Notes and references ==
- Spring and Autumn Annals of the Ten Kingdoms, vol. 98.
- Zizhi Tongjian, vols. 275, 276, 277.
