= Xu Ji =

Chinese politician from Former Shu (d. 936)

Xu Ji (許寂) (died July 5, 936), courtesy name Xianxian (閑閑), was an official of the Chinese Five Dynasties and Ten Kingdoms Period state Former Shu, serving as a chancellor during the reign of its last emperor Wang Zongyan.

== Background ==
It is not known when Xu Ji was born, but it is known that he was from Kuaiji (modern Shaoxing in Zhejiang). His grandfather Xu Mi (許秘) was said to be famous in the region. In his youth, he took up residence in the Siming Mountains (四明山, a branch mountain range of the Tiantai Mountains) to study the I Ching from a scholar known only as Lord Jinzheng (晉徵君).

At some point, then-reigning Emperor Zhaozong of Tang became aware of Xu Ji's reputation, and summoned him (probably to the capital Chang'an), wanting to meet him. When Xu arrived at the palace, however, Emperor Zhaozong was playing music with performers, and did not see Xu immediately. Xu was unimpressed, and, after meeting the emperor, requested to return to the mountains. He eventually took up residence at Jiangling. After the warlord Zhao Kuangming became the military governor (Jiedushi) of Jingnan Circuit (荊南, headquartered at Jiangling), Zhao treated him with respect and often requested his advice on proper living.

In 905, Zhao Kuangming was under threat of impending attack by the major warlord Zhu Quanzhong the military governor of Xuanwu Circuit (宣武, headquartered in modern Kaifeng, Henan) (after Zhu had already defeated Zhao's brother Zhao Kuangning the military governor of Zhongyi Circuit (忠義, headquartered in modern Xiangyang, Hubei) and forced Zhao Kuangning to flee his territory). He decided to flee to the territory of Wang Jian the military governor of Xichuan Circuit (西川, headquartered in modern Chengdu, Sichuan). Xu fled to Xichuan with Zhao. Wang had known of Xu's reputation, and gave him a pavilion at which he could conduct his studies.

== During Wang Jian's reign ==
In 907, after Zhu Quanzhong had Tang's final emperor Emperor Ai of Tang yield the throne to him, ending Tang and starting a new Later Liang, Wang Jian, who was among the warlords who refused to recognize the new emperor, declared himself emperor of a new state of Shu (known historically as Former Shu). In Wang's new imperial regime, Xu Ji was made Zuo Jianyi Daifu (左諫議大夫), a consultant serving at the examination bureau of government (門下省). In 913, pursuant to the recommendation of Du Guangting, whom Wang Jian asked for recommendations for virtuous advisors for his son and crown prince Wang Yuanying, Wang Jian put Xu Ji and Xu Jianfu (徐簡夫) on Wang Yuanying's staff. However, Wang Yuanying refused to speak to them, and instead spent his time in games and pleasure with his favorites. Xu Ji was later promoted to be the deputy minister of civil service affairs (吏部侍郎, Libu Shilang). (It is unclear whether his promotion was before or after Wang Yuanying's death after an armed conflict with Wang Jian's close associate Tang Daoxi, later in 913. Wang Jian later made his youngest son Wang Zongyan crown prince.)

== During Wang Yan's reign ==
In 918, Wang Jian died and was succeeded by Wang Zongyan (who then changed his name to Wang Yan). Shortly after Wang Yan took the throne, the senior chancellor Zhang Ge, who had closely associated with the eunuch Tang Wenyi (唐文扆) — who was executed after an unsuccessful bid to seize power in Wang Jian's illness — was exiled. As part of Zhang's exile, many of Zhang's associates were also demoted or exiled, and Xu was accused to be one and so was demoted. It was said that after quite a long time, Xu was repromoted to be the minister of rites (禮部尚書, Libu Shangshu).

In 924, Xu was made Zhongshu Shilang (中書侍郎), the deputy head of the legislative bureau (中書省, Zhongshu Sheng); he was also given the designation Tong Zhongshu Menxia Pingzhangshi (同中書門下平章事), making him a chancellor. Around the new year 925, Zhang, who had been recalled from exile, was also made chancellor again. Zhang took the opportunity to retaliate against the administrator Wang Lurou (王魯柔), who had acted against Zhang when Zhang was embroiled in the political storm after Tang's death, by finding an excuse to cane Wang to death. This caused Xu to comment, "Lord Zhang is talented but lacks common sense. Killing one Wang Lurou makes other people fear for their own safety. This is the way to bring disaster."

== After Former Shu's destruction ==
In 925, Former Shu was destroyed by an invasion of its northeastern neighbor Later Tang (which had earlier destroyed Later Liang). Xu and a number of Former Shu officials, including chancellor colleague Wang Kai, surrendered to the Later Tang army and were taken to the Later Tang capital Luoyang, where he was given the honorary title of minister and allowed to retire. He resided at a mansion where he directed the water to be in the form of a creek, and built a bamboo bridge over it. Citing the cosmological beliefs that bamboos were capable of transforming into dragons, he named the bridge, "The Bridge to Meet the Dragon." It was said that Xu, despite his old age, was still healthy, but spoke very little, other than often speaking, in the Shu tongue, "It is odd. It is odd." He later died by illness in retirement, in 936.

== Notes and references ==
- Spring and Autumn Annals of the Ten Kingdoms, vol. 41.
- Zizhi Tongjian, vols. 268, 270, 273.
