= Wang Zongji =

Wang Zongji (王宗佶) (died May 1, 908), né Gan (甘), was an adoptive son of Wang Jian, the founding emperor of the Five Dynasties and Ten Kingdoms period state Former Shu. He was the oldest among Wang Jian's 120 adoptive sons and considered himself a potential successor to Wang Jian. In 908, Wang Jian, angry over his arrogance, had him put to death.

== Background ==
It is not known when Wang Zongji was born. He was said to be from Hong Prefecture (洪州, in modern Nanchang, Jiangxi) and had the surname of Gan. When Wang Jian was still a soldier at Zhongwu Circuit (忠武, headquartered in modern Xuchang, Henan), he captured Wang Zongji; he then adopted and raised Wang Zongji as his own son.

== Service under Wang Jian during Tang Dynasty ==
Later, during Wang Jian's campaigns that eventually allowed him to gain control of the modern Sichuan and Chongqing region, Wang Zongji served under him with distinction. As a result, in 899, when, under Wang Jian's request, five prefectures were carved out of Dongchuan Circuit (東川, headquartered in modern Mianyang, Sichuan), which Wang Jian had just conquered by defeating Gu Yanhui, to establish a new Wuxin Circuit (武信, headquartered in modern Suining, Sichuan), Wang Zongji was made its military governor (Jiedushi).

In 901, after the powerful eunuch Han Quanhui forced then-reigning Emperor Zhaozong of Tang to leave Chang'an to go to the territory of Han's ally Li Maozhen the military governor of Fengxiang Circuit (鳳翔, headquartered in modern Baoji, Shaanxi), Zhu Quanzhong the military governor of Xuanwu Circuit (宣武, headquartered in modern Kaifeng, Henan), whom Emperor Zhaozong's chancellor Cui Yin had just summoned in order to carry out Cui's plot of slaughtering the eunuchs (and whose plot Han was reacting to), attacked Fengxiang to try to recapture the emperor. Both Li and Zhu sought aid from Wang Jian. Wang Jian tried to play both sides by outwardly agreeing with Zhu and rebuking Li, but sent secret messengers to Fengxiang to encourage Li to hold out — while sending Wang Zongji and another adoptive son, Wang Zongdi, north to attack Shannan West Circuit (山南西道, headquartered in modern Hanzhong, Shaanxi), which Li possessed at the time. In 902, Li's adoptive son Li Jimi (李繼密) the military governor of Shannan West surrendered it, allowing Wang Jian to take it under possession. Wang Jian initially commissioned Wang Zongdi as the military governor of Shannan West, but Wang Zongji and several other generals, jealous of Wang Zongdi, submitted false accusations against Wang Zongdi, eventually leading to Wang Jian's recalling Wang Zongdi to his capital Chengdu and putting Wang Zongdi to death.

Wang Zongji's activities for the next few years are lost to history, although at some point he must have served as the military governor of Dongchuan, as that was later referred to as a former office he held.

== During Wang Jian's reign ==
In 907, after Zhu Quanzhong forced Emperor Zhaozong's son and successor Emperor Ai to yield the throne to him, ending Tang Dynasty and establishing Later Liang as its Emperor Taizu, Wang Jian, after initially declaring that he, along with several other military governors who refused to recognize the Later Liang emperor's authority (Li Keyong, Li Maozhen, and Yang Wo) would jointly attack Zhu to reestablish Tang, decided to declare himself emperor as well. Late that year, he declared a new state of Shu (known to later historians as Former Shu) as its emperor. He made Wang Zongji a chancellor with the title of Zhongshu Ling (中書令). (Initially, Wang Zongji was the only fully titled chancellor, as Wei Zhuang, also made a chancellor, was not given a full chancellor title). He also created Wang Zongji the Duke of Jin.

Soon, however, Wang Zongji and a close associate of Wang Jian's, Tang Daoxi, who was made the director of palace communications, became rivals, as Wang Zongji was said to be arrogant and rude on account of his accomplishments and his status as Wang Jian's oldest adoptive son, offending Tang by addressing Tang by name rather than by his proper titles. Wang Jian also became apprehensive of Wang Zongji, as Wang Zongji was creating a group of followers around himself. In spring 908, Wang Jian removed him from his chancellor post while giving him the titularly greater title of Taishi (太師).

Resentful of his removal, Wang Zongji was said to continue to foster his group of followers and consider a coup. Further, challenging Wang Jian's initial failure to name an heir — as Wang Jian created his second son Wang Zongyi the Prince of Sui but did not create him crown prince (Wang Jian's oldest biological son Wang Zongren (王宗仁) was disabled and therefore considered by Wang Jian to be unfit to serve as heir), Wang Zongji submitted an irreverent petition to Wang Jian:

I, your subject, am a major official in title, but close to you as your oldest son. Whatever happens to the state and the imperial house is for me to share. Right now, no crown prince has been named, and this will surely bring disturbances. If Your Imperial Majesty believes that Zongyi's abilities are fit for him to serve as heir, you should create him crown prince as soon as possible. You can then make me the supreme commander of the armed forces, to command the six armies. If you believe that the times are difficult and that Zongyi is too young, your subject will not dare to yield those responsibilities. Since Your Imperial Majesty has taken the throne and faces the south, you should entrust the matters of the military to your subject. I urge that you establish a headquarters for the supreme commander, with seals to command the six armies, and put your subject in charge of giving marching orders to the armies. The Crown Prince can attend to your meals in the morning and the evening, while your subject can command the soldiers to protect you. This is important for your eternal realm. May Your Imperial Majesty rule on this.

Wang Jian was incensed, but did not initially publicly express displeasure. When he discussed the matter with Tang, Tang, in order to inflame him more, stated, "Zongji's reputation is so grand such that both people inside and outside the palace fear him. He would be a suitable commander." This caused Wang Jian to be further suspicious of Wang Zongji. Soon thereafter, on an occasion Wang Zongji was in the palace to greet Wang Jian, Wang Zongji spoke arrogantly. When Wang Jian rebuked him, he refused to yield. Wang Jian, in anger, ordered the guards to batter him to death. He also exiled Wang Zongji's associates Zheng Qian (鄭騫) and Li Gang (李鋼), and further ordered them to commit suicide on their journey to exile.

== Notes and references ==
- Spring and Autumn Annals of the Ten Kingdoms (十國春秋), vol. 39.
- Zizhi Tongjian, vols. 261, 262, 263, 266.
