= Pan Qiao =

Pan Qiao (潘峭) was an official of the Chinese Five Dynasties and Ten Kingdoms period state Former Shu, serving as a director of palace communications (Shumishi) under its founding emperor Wang Jian (Former Shu) (Emperor Gaozu).

== Background ==
It is not known when or where Pan Qiao was born. It was said that his ancestors were originally from the Hexi region.

== During Former Shu ==
It is also not known when Pan Qiao initially came to serve under Wang Jian (while Wang Jian was still a Tang dynasty warlord), but it is known that after Wang Jian declared himself emperor of a new state of Former Shu, he initially made Pan a director of palace affairs (宣徽使, Xuanhuishi). In 911, Wang Jian made Pan's older brother Pan Kang, who was then the director of palace communications, the military governor of Wutai Circuit (武泰, headquartered in modern Chongqing), while making Pan Qiao the new director of palace communications.

By 913, an intense rivalry between Wang Jian's son and crown prince Wang Yuanying and Wang Jian's close associate Tang Daoxi flared up on the eve of the Qixi Festival, when Wang Yuanying held a feast for the high-level officials. However, Wang Jian's adoptive son Wang Zonghan (王宗翰) the Prince of Ji, as well as Pan Qiao and the chief imperial scholar Mao Wenxi did not attend. Wang Yuanying became angry, believing that Pan Qiao and Mao must have alienated Wang Zonghan from him. The next day, he accused to Wang Jian that Pan Qiao and Mao were alienating him and his brothers, and Wang Jian initially believed so, ordering Pan Qiao and Mao demoted while making Pan Kang the director of palace communications again. However, Tang later accused Wang Yuanying of plotting treason. Tang's accusations eventually led to a battle between imperial guards under him and the guards under Wang Yuanying's command. During the battle, Wang Yuanying arrested Pan Qiao and Mao and nearly battered them to death, while Tang was killed in battle. However, after Wang Jian (at Pan Kang's urging) personally met the senior generals to encourage them, Wang Yuanying's army collapsed, and Wang Yuanying was killed by a soldier. After Wang Yuanying's death, Pan Qiao was again made director of palace communications.

In 914, Pan Qiao was made the military governor of Wutai Circuit and given the honorary chancellor designation of Tong Zhongshu Menxia Pingzhangshi (同中書門下平章事). That was the last historical reference to him, and it was said that he died after a long while due to illness, implying that he died while still serving as the military governor of Wutai.

== Notes and references ==
- Spring and Autumn Annals of the Ten Kingdoms (十國春秋), vol. 41.
- Zizhi Tongjian, vols. 268, 269.
