= Sichuan Museum =

Provincial museum in Chengdu, Sichuan, China

- 四川博物院
- Established: 1941; 85 years ago
- Location: 251 South Huanhua Road, Qingyang, Chengdu, Sichuan, China
- Coordinates: 30.6631°N 104.0315°E
- Type: Provincial museum
- Website: scmuseum.cn

The Sichuan Museum (Chinese: 四川博物院) is a public provincial museum in Chengdu, Sichuan, China. It is owned and funded by the Sichuan Provincial People's Government. Founded in 1941, the museum holds collections spanning the archeology, history, art, and ethnography of Sichuan and the wider Ba–Shu region. As of 2026, the museum held more than 360,000 cultural objects, including 1,318 objects classified as first-grade cultural relics under China's system of cultural-property protection.

The museum's present building complex, near Huanhuaxi Park and the Du Fu Thatched Cottage, opened in 2009. The institution is designated a National First-Class Museum by China's National Cultural Heritage Administration. In 2024, it was selected as one of 15 museums in a national program jointly supported by central and local governments.

== History ==
The museum was established in Chengdu in 1941. Archeologist Feng Hanji (冯汉骥), who had taught at National Sichuan University until 1939, was recruited by the Sichuan provincial education authorities to organize the museum and became its first director. The museum opened exhibitions in the spring of that year. Feng also led the excavation of the tomb of Wang Jian, founder of the Former Shu, now preserved as the Yongling Mausoleum. Archeological fieldwork subsequently became an important source of additions to the museum's collections.

Following the Communist party's takeover of Chengdu in December 1949, the institution was renamed the Western Sichuan Museum (川西博物馆) in 1950. It was renamed Sichuan Museum in 1952. During the following decades, its holdings grew substantially through archeological excavations, transfers, donations, and acquisitions.

A new building complex for the museum was planned at the Huanhuaxi (浣花溪) area of Qingyang in western Chengdu. After approximately seven years of construction, it was completed and opened in 2009.

In 2012, the museum was designated a National First-Class Museum (国家一级博物馆) by the National Cultural Heritage Administration. In 2024, the National Cultural Heritage Administration and the Ministry of Finance jointly designated it as a Central and Local Governments Jointly Developed National Key Museum (中央地方共建国家级重点博物馆), alongside fourteen other local museums, including the Shanghai Museum, Nanjing Museum, Hubei Provincial Museum, and Shaanxi History Museum.

== Building and exhibitions ==
The present museum occupies about 88 mu, approximately 5.9 ha (15 acres). Its main building has a floor area of 32,026 square meters and is characterized by two large sloping roofs influenced by traditional architecture of western Sichuan. It stands within Chengdu's Huanhuaxi cultural area, near the Du Fu Thatched Cottage, Qingyang Palace (青羊宫), and Huanhuaxi Park (浣花溪公园).

The museum's permanent exhibitions focus primarily on the history and material culture of Sichuan. Long-running galleries have covered Ba and Shu bronzes, Han-dynasty pottery and carved stone, ceramics, Chinese painting and calligraphy, Tibetan Buddhist art, ethnic and folk culture, and Buddhist sculptures excavated from the site of the former Wanfo Temple (万佛寺) in Chengdu. A dedicated gallery presents works by the Sichuan-born painter Zhang Daqian, including copies of Buddhist murals that he produced during his studies at the Mogao Caves in Dunhuang.

== Collections ==
The museum's collections cover archeology, ceramics, bronze vessels and weapons, sculpture, painting and calligraphy, coins, historical inscriptions, ethnographic objects, folk arts, and modern historical material. Particularly important groups include ancient Ba–Shu bronzes, Han-dynasty tomb sculpture and pictorial bricks, Buddhist stone sculpture, Tibetan Buddhist objects, and works by Zhang Daqian.

Among notable individual objects are a Neolithic human-face pendant associated with the Daxi culture, a Warring States period bronze vessel decorated with scenes of land and naval warfare, fragments of stone steles engraved with Confucian classics during the Later Shu, and the Tang-dynasty guqin known as Shijian Qiaobing (石涧敲冰; lit. 'Knocking Ice by a Mountain Stream').

The Warring States bronze vessel depicts more than 200 figures engaged in activities including warfare, hunting, banqueting, archery, and the gathering of mulberry leaves for sericulture. The museum also holds material recovered through decades of archeological work in Sichuan, which contributed substantially to the study of the province's prehistoric cultures, ancient Ba and Shu societies, and Han-period material culture.

In addition to collecting and exhibiting objects, the museum carries out conservation and restoration work. By 2026, it operated 17 conservation laboratories and restoration studios. These facilities undertake conservation work for the museum and for cultural heritage held elsewhere in Sichuan.

== See also ==
- Chengdu Museum
- Sanxingdui Museum
- Jinsha Site Museum
- List of museums in China
- Ba–Shu culture
