= Song Guangsi =

Song Guangsi (Chinese: 宋光嗣) (died December 8, 925?) was a powerful eunuch of the Chinese Former Shu dynasty, serving both of its emperors, Wang Jian (Emperor Gaozu) and Wang Zongyan.

== Service under Wang Jian ==
It is not known when Song Guangsi was born or how he became an eunuch, but it is known that he was from Fu Prefecture (福州, in modern Fuzhou, Fujian). It is not known how he came under service to Wang Jian. The first reference to him was that he was serving under Wang Jian's daughter, whom Wang created the Princess Puning (according to the Spring and Autumn Annals of the Ten Kingdoms (十國春秋) or Princess Puci (according to the Zizhi Tongjian) after Former Shu was founded, but whom he had married, in 905, before the founding in the state, to Li Jichong (李繼崇) the military governor (Jiedushi) of Tianxiong Circuit (天雄, headquartered in modern Tianshui, Gansu), who was a nephew of Wang's ally Li Maozhen the Prince of Qi. However, it was not clear whether Song had earlier served Wang and thereafter accompanied Wang's daughter to Qi, or whether he came under her service as a subject of Qi.

The princess' marriage to Li Jichong was not a happy one. In 911, by which time Wang was the emperor of his new state of Former Shu, she had Song write a letter for her, on silk, to Wang, claiming that Li Jichong was arrogant and a drunkard, and asking to return to the Former Shu capital Chengdu. Wang sent emissaries to Qi, recalling the princess for what was claimed to be a temporary visit home. However, after she arrived in Chengdu, Wang kept her there and did not return her to Li Jichong, and he kept Song under his service in the palace. In anger, Li Maozhen cut off his alliance with Former Shu.

As of 918, Song was serving in Wang's palace as the director of palace affairs (宣徽使, Xuanhuishi). That year, when Wang fell ill, another eunuch, Tang Wenyi (唐文扆), tried to seize control of the palace and take over the governance of the state. When this was discovered, a group of officials, led by Wang's adoptive son Wang Zongbi, whom Wang Jian had intended to entrust his son and heir Wang Zongyan to, forced their way into the palace and had Tang deposed. In the aftermath, Wang Jian, who had up to that point not put any eunuch in the powerful position of director of palace communications (Shumishi), decided to put Song in that position and entrust military matters to him, as, while he was entrusting Wang Zongbi and several other adoptive sons Wang Zongyao (王宗瑤), Wang Zongwan (王宗綰), and Wang Zongkui (王宗夔), with the responsibilities of assisting the young emperor, also feared that they or other generals, as senior generals, might not follow all of the new emperor's commands. Shortly after, Wang Jian died, and Wang Yan took the throne.

== Service under Wang Yan ==
After Wang Yan took the throne, he entrusted much of the affairs of state to Wang Zongbi and Song Guangsi, who was put in command of the palace guards. Wang Zongbi was described to be corrupt, and Song described to be engaging in frequent flattery; the two were thus blamed by traditional historians for the decline of the Former Shu state. With the precedent of Song being involved in affairs of state, Wang Yan went on to commission a number of other eunuchs as generals and administrators, including Wang Tingshao (王廷紹), Ouyang Huang (歐陽晃), Li Zhoulu (李周輅), Song Chengyun (宋承蘊), Tian Luchou (田魯儔), and Song Guangsi's cousin Song Guangbao (宋光葆). Later in 918, Song Guangsi offered to be relieved of the command of the palace guards and recommended that the command be transferred to Wang Zongbi; Wang Yan agreed.

By 924, the governance of the Former Shu state was said to be in such disarray that the general Wang Zongchou (王宗儔, another adoptive son of Wang Jian's) was trying to persuade Wang Zongbi to depose Wang Yan and replace him with a more capable emperor. Wang Zongbi, however, hesitated, and Wang Zongchou, in fear of the news being leaked, died in distress. After Wang Zongchou's death, Wang Zongbi instead told Song Guangsi and fellow director of palace communications, Jing Runcheng (景潤澄), "Wang Zongchou told me to kill people like you. Now that he is dead, you have nothing to worry." Song and Jing, believing him, wept and thanked him. However, hearing of this episode, Wang Zongbi's son Wang Chengban (王承班), commented, "Our household cannot escape disaster."

In 925, Former Shu's northeastern neighbor Later Tang launched a major attack on Former Shu, seeking to destroy it. Wang Yan, however, did not initially consider this attack to be a major threat even after Wuxing Circuit (武興, headquartered in modern Baoji, Shaanxi) had fallen, and Wang Zongbi and Song further assuaged him by stating that all he needed to do was to station the main Former Shu army at Li Prefecture (利州, in modern Guangyuan, Sichuan) to block the path of the Later Tang forces, Later Tang would not dare to advance deeply into Former Shu territory, as Former Shu still maintained sizable garrisons at Shannan (山南, headquartered in modern Hanzhong, Sichuan) and Dongchuan (東川, headquartered in modern Mianyang, Sichuan) Circuits. However, instead, the Later Tang forces repeatedly defeated Former Shu forces, causing Wang Yan to panic and flee from Li back to Chengdu, leaving Wang Zongbi to defend Li. He also left Wang Zongbi instructions to execute three generals who had been losing battles against Later Tang, Wang Zongxun (王宗勳), Wang Zongyan (王宗儼, note different character than Wang Yan's former name), and Wang Zongyu (王宗昱). As soon as Wang Yan left for Chengdu, however, Wang Zongbi abandoned Li as well and rendezvoused with Wang Zongxun, Wang Zongyan, and Wang Zongyu, informing them that it was Song who wanted them dead. They thereafter jointly considered surrendering to the Later Tang army. Wang Zongbi thereafter took his army back to Chengdu, seized Wang Yan and the imperial household, and executed Song, Jing, Li, Ouyang, and the official Han Zhao (韓昭), blaming them for Wang Yan's decadent administration, before forcing Wang Yan to surrender to Later Tang.

== Notes and references ==
- Spring and Autumn Annals of the Ten Kingdoms, vol. 46.
- Zizhi Tongjian, vols. 267, 270, 272, 273, 274.
