= Zhou Xiang =

Zhou Xiang (Chinese: 周庠) was a chief strategist for Wang Jian, the founding emperor (Emperor Gaozu) of the Chinese Five Dynasties and Ten Kingdoms period state Former Shu, during Wang Jian's years of warfare to firmly establish himself as a warlord late in preceding Tang dynasty. After the founding of Former Shu, Zhou served as a chancellor.

== During the Tang dynasty ==
It is not known when Zhou Xiang was born, but he was said to be from Xu Prefecture (許州, in modern Xuchang, Henan). The first historical reference to him was in 887, when he was referred to as a former storage officer for Long Prefecture (龍州, in modern Mianyang, Sichuan). Apparently, after leaving that post, he became a guest of the general Wang Jian, who was then the prefect of Li Prefecture (利州, in modern Guangyuan, Sichuan).

In 887, then-reigning Emperor Xizong of Tang commissioned a new military governor (jiedushi) of Shannan West Circuit (山南西道, headquartered in modern Hanzhong, Shaanxi), which Li Prefecture belonged to—Yang Shouliang, the adoptive nephew of the powerful eunuch Yang Fugong. Yang Shouliang was apprehensive about Wang's military abilities, and made several attempts to summon him to Shannan West's capital Xingyuan Municipality (興元). Wang, in fear of what Yang might do to him, refused to go, and asked Zhou for advice. Zhou stated to him:

The lifespan of Tang is near its end. The circuits are consuming each other, but none of their governors have long-term strategies, and they cannot pacify and help the people stricken by disasters. You, Lord, are brave and intelligent, and you also have the support of your soldiers. Of course it would be you who accomplish great things. But Jiameng [(葭萌, i.e., Li's capital)] is a place that has already seen four battles, and it is not a place where you can find long-term safety. Lang Prefecture [(閬州, in modern Nanchong, Sichuan)] is remotely located, and its population is wealthy. [Its prefect] Yang Maoshi [(楊茂實)] is a close associate of Chen Jingxuan and Tian Lingzi [(Chen was the military governor of Xichuan Circuit (西川, headquartered in modern Chengdu, Sichuan), and Tian was his brother, formerly a highly powerful, but despised, eunuch, who was then taking refuge with Chen, who was disobeying imperial directives in sheltering Tian)], and therefore has not been properly submitting tributes. If you report his crimes to the imperial government and raise an army to attack him, you can capture him in a single battle.

Wang agreed with Zhou, and he subsequently gathered a group of 8,000 men from the tribes of the area, and then launched a surprise attack on Lang Prefecture via Jialing River. He expelled Yang Maoshi and took over Lang, claiming to be its defender. He then further built up his troops, using Lang as a base. Yang Shouliang could not control him at all from that point on.

Wang later became embroiled in a campaign against Chen to try to take over Xichuan Circuit, but was initially unable to prevail. By summer 888, Wang, believing that he could no longer pillage the surroundings of Xichuan's capital Chengdu and that Chengdu's defenses were so strong that he could not prevail quickly, considered withdrawing. Both Zhou and another strategist, Qiwu Jian (綦毋諫), opposed, with Zhou proposing that he instead attack and capture one of Xichuan's prefectures, Qiong Prefecture to use as a base of operations, as the area around Qiong Prefecture was wealthy and capable of sustaining his army. Wang had another idea—that he should petition the imperial government to send a senior official to head the operations against Chen and serve as that official's assistant, so he had Zhou draft a petition on his behalf, to then-reigning Emperor Zhaozong (Emperor Xizong's brother and successor), who had long hated Tian. Emperor Zhaozong, in response to Wang's petition and a similar petition from Wang's ally Gu Yanlang the military governor of Dongchuan Circuit (東川, headquartered in modern Mianyang), commissioned the chancellor Wei Zhaodu to be the military governor of Xichuan, and, when Chen refused to allow Wei to take over, declared a general campaign against Chen, with Wei in command and Wang, Gu, and Yang Shouliang serving as Wei's assistants.

By 891, the army sieging Chengdu, consisting of troops largely from Wang but also with troops from Gu, had put Chengdu into a chokehold such that the population was starving. However, the imperial government had just suffered a major loss in campaign against another warlord, Li Keyong the military governor of Hedong Circuit (河東, headquartered in modern Taiyuan, Shanxi), and the costs of the Xichuan campaign gave Emperor Zhaozong second thoughts. In spring 891, Emperor Zhaozong issued an edict pardoning Chen and ordering Gu and Wang to return to their own circuits (Emperor Zhaozong's having earlier carved out four prefectures of Xichuan as a new Yongping Circuit (永平, headquartered at Qiong Prefecture, which Wang had captured) and made Wang its military governor). Wang, however, believing that this was a prime chance to capture Xichuan, and when he consulted Zhou, Zhou suggested that he urge Wei to return to the imperial court while he himself would then maintain the campaign. Wang then intimidated Wei by executing one of his close associates, Luo Bao (駱保), on purported offenses of embezzlement. Wei, frightened, transferred his command to Wang and left for the imperial capital Chang'an. Wang subsequently continued the siege, and in fall 891, Chen and Tian surrendered. Wang took over Xichuan Circuit and was subsequently confirmed by Emperor Zhaozong as its military governor.

There were no further historical references to specific strategic suggestions that Zhou made to Wang, but it was said that much of Wang's subsequent pacification of the region, including his takeover of Dongchuan, could be credited to additional strategies that Zhou offered.

== During Wang Jian's reign ==
In 907, another major warlord, Zhu Quanzhong the military governor of Xuanwu Circuit (宣武, headquartered in modern Kaifeng, Henan), had Emperor Zhaozong's son and successor Emperor Ai yield the throne to him, ending Tang and starting a new Later Liang with him as its Emperor Taizu. Wang Jian, along with Li Keyong, Li Maozhen the military governor of Fengxiang Circuit (鳳翔, headquartered in modern Baoji, Shaanxi), and Yang Wo the military governor of Huainan Circuit (淮南, headquartered in modern Yangzhou, Jiangsu), refused to recognize the new Later Liang emperor, and briefly, Wang and Yang were jointly issuing declarations calling for the entire realm to rise against Later Liang. However, when they did not get sufficient responses, Wang decided to declare himself the emperor of a new state of Shu (known later as Former Shu) (as its Emperor Gaozu). In 910, he made Zhou Xiang Zhongshu Shilang (中書侍郎, the deputy head of the legislative bureau of government (中書省, Zhongshu Sheng)) and chancellor, with the designation Tong Zhongshu Menxia Pingzhangshi (同中書門下平章事). However, nothing else was recorded in history about Zhou's acts during Wang Jian's reign.

== During Wang Yan's reign ==
After Wang Jian died in 918 and was succeeded by his son Wang Zongyan as emperor, he trusted a number of eunuchs, making them generals and allowing them to intervene in governance. It was said that they were arrogant, unrestrained, corrupt, and violent, causing much damage to the state. When Zhou Xiang tried to urge Wang Yan to change his ways, Wang Yan would not listen. In 920, he made Zhou the military governor of Yongping Circuit (then-headquartered in modern Ya'an, Sichuan), sending him out of the capital but still having him maintain the Tong Zhongshu Menxia Pingzhangshi designation as an honorary chancellor. Zhou died shortly after due to illness.

== Notes and references ==
- Spring and Autumn Annals of the Ten Kingdoms (十國春秋), vol. 40.
- Zizhi Tongjian, vols. 256, 257, 258, 270, 271.
