= Wang Kai (Former Shu) =

Wang Kai (王鍇), courtesy name Zhanxiang (鱣祥), was a chancellor of the Chinese Five Dynasties and Ten Kingdoms period Former Shu state.

== Background ==
It is not known when or where Wang Kai was born. It is known that he served as an emissary of Emperor Zhaozong of Tang during the Tianfu era (901–904) to Xichuan Circuit (西川, headquartered in modern Chengdu, Sichuan) late in the Tang dynasty, and thereafter remained in Xichuan, which was then ruled by Wang Jian.

== During Former Shu ==
After the Tang dynasty fell in 907 and Wang Jian declared himself emperor of a new Shu state (known historically as Former Shu) over his domain (as its Emperor Gaozu), Wang Kai became an imperial scholar (翰林學士, Hanlin Xueshi). He later became the deputy chief imperial censor (御史中丞, Yushi Zhongcheng). In 909, Wang Jian made him Zhongshu Shilang (中書侍郎), the deputy head of the legislative bureau of government (中書省, Zhongshu Sheng), and gave him the designation Tong Zhongshu Menxia Pingzhangshi (同中書門下平章事), making him a chancellor. In 911, when Wang Jian built a new palace and issued an edict ordering the collection of books, Wang Kai submitted a petition praising the effort and outlining how many emperors in history have used various efforts to collect and encouraged the reading of books. In 912, Wang Kai was removed from his chancellor position and made the minister of defense (兵部尚書, Bingbu Shangshu), but in 913 was restored to the chancellor and Zhongshu Shilang positions.

During the subsequent reign of Wang Jian's son Wang Zongyan, Wang Kai served as chancellor with Yu Chuansu. At that time, Wang Yan's associates Han Zhao (韓昭) and Pan Zaiying (潘在迎) led Wang Yan to spend much of his time in frivolous activities, and it was said that Wang Kai, Yu, and most other officials did little to try to change Wang Yan's ways. Indeed, even after a very expensive trip that Wang Yan took to Lang Prefecture (閬州, in modern Langzhong, Sichuan), after which many officials did submit petitions urging against such trips in the future, Wang Kai said nothing and did not resign in protest. When a major invasion from Later Tang led to Wang Yan's surrender and Former Shu's fall in 925, Wang Yan had the imperial scholar Li Hao draft the surrender petition (to Later Tang's emperor Emperor Zhuangzong of Later Tang) and Wang Kai draft the surrender letter (to Emperor Zhuangzong's son Li Jiji the Prince of Wei, who was formally the commander of the Later Tang invasion army).

== After Former Shu ==
Emperor Zhuangzong initially promised Wang Yan that he would be created an honorable title, and Li Jiji subsequently sent Wang Yan and a large group of Former Shu officials on their way to the Later Tang capital Luoyang in 926. However, after the Later Tang realm began to be embroiled in a large number of rebellions (over the army's dissatisfaction over Emperor Zhuangzong for not giving soldiers sufficient rewards and over his killing of the generals Guo Chongtao and Li Jilin), Emperor Zhuangzong initially ordered Wang Yan to halt at Chang'an, and then put him and his family to death. The Former Shu officials, by order, continued to proceed to Luoyang, but by the time they reached Luoyang, Emperor Zhuangzong himself had been killed in a mutiny at Luoyang and succeeded by his adoptive brother Emperor Mingzong. Emperor Mingzong commissioned many former Former Shu officials to be regional officials, and Wang Kai was made a prefectural prefect. Wang Kai and a number of former Former Shu officials subsequently submitted a petition urging for the proper burial of Wang Yan's body, and for this they were praised by people. (Wang Yan was eventually properly buried in 928 due to efforts by Wang Jian's distant nephew Wang Zongshou (王宗壽).)

The rest of Wang Kai's career, and his death date, are not known. However, it is known that Wang Kai had a large collection of rare books at home, and that he himself had written lengthy commentaries. He was also well known for his calligraphy and studiousness.

== Notes and references ==
- Spring and Autumn Annals of the Ten Kingdoms (十國春秋), vol. 41.
- Zizhi Tongjian, vols. 267, 268, 272, 274, 275.
