= Pan Kang =

Pan Kang (潘炕), courtesy name Ningmeng (凝夢), was an official of the Chinese Five Dynasties and Ten Kingdoms period state Former Shu, serving as a director of palace communications (Shumishi).

== Background and service under Wang Jian ==
It is not known when or where Pan Kang was born. It was said that his ancestors were originally from the Hexi region. Pan himself was said to be tolerant and mature, with his family members rarely seeing him happy or angry.

As of 910, Pan was serving as one of the directors of palace affairs (宣徽使, Xuanhuishi) under Former Shu's founding emperor Wang Jian. Early that year, after a conflict between Wang Jian's son and crown prince Wang Zongyi and the director of palace communications Tang Daoxi blew up into the open, with both of them accusing each other of crimes, Wang Jian tried to defuse the tension by sending Tang out of the capital Chengdu to serve as the military governor of Shannan Circuit (山南, headquartered in modern Hanzhong, Shaanxi). Wang Jian asked Tang for his recommendation for his replacement, and Tang initially endorsed Pan's colleague (as the other director of palace affairs) Zheng Xu (鄭頊). However, the day after Zheng was commissioned, he began to consider investigating embezzlement by Tang's brothers. Tang, in shock, informed Wang Jian that Zheng was intolerant and violent in disposition, unsuitable for the position. Wang Jian believed him, and so sent Zheng out of the capital to serve as a prefectural prefect, while making Pan the director of palace communications.

In 911, Wang Jian made Pan the military governor of Wutai Circuit (武泰, headquartered in modern Chongqing), while making Pan's younger brother Pan Qiao the new director of palace communications.

By 913, Wang Jian had recalled Tang to the capital, and the old rivalry between Tang and Wang Zongyi (whose name had been changed to Wang Yuanying by this point) flared up. This matter flared up on the eve of the Qixi Festival, when Wang Yuanying held a feast for the high-level officials. However, Wang Jian's adoptive son Wang Zonghan (王宗翰) the Prince of Ji, as well as Pan Qiao and the chief imperial scholar Mao Wenxi, did not attend. Wang Yuanying became angry, believing that Pan Qiao and Mao must have alienated Wang Zonghan from him. The next day, he accused to Wang Jian that Pan Qiao and Mao were alienating him and his brothers, and Wang Jian initially believed so, ordering Pan Qiao and Mao demoted while making Pan Kang the director of palace communications again. However, Tang later accused Wang Yuanying of plotting treason. Tang's accusations eventually led to a battle between imperial guards under him and the guards under Wang Yuanying's command. Tang was initially killed in battle, but after Wang Jian (at Pan Kang's urging) personally met the senior generals to encourage them, Wang Yuanying's army collapsed, and Wang Yuanying was killed by a soldier.

After Wang Yuanying's death, Pan Kang repeatedly requested Wang Jian to create a new crown prince. Wang Jian selected his youngest son Wang Zongyan the Prince of Zheng (after incorrectly concluding that Wang Zongyan had the most support by his officials). After he did so, Pan, citing the fact that there was nothing else that he considered urgent for him to remain in imperial service, sought to retire. Wang Jian, after initially declining to grant Pan retirement, eventually did so after Pan requested again tearfully. However, it was said that even in retirement, Wang Jian often sent messengers to consult him on important matters.

It was also said that Pan had a favorite beautiful concubine, named Jiechou (解愁), who was also talented in music. Wang Jian once visited Pan's mansion and stated to Pan, "Among my palace ladies, there is no one like she is," hoping that Pan would offer her to him. Pan responded, "This is but a dishonored person belonging to your subject. I do not dare to let her taint Your Imperial Majesty." When Pan Qiao urged that he offer Xianchou to the emperor, arguing that he might be bringing trouble for himself, Pan Kang stated, "In a man's life, he should treasure his happiness. How should one fear death and deny his heart?" It was said that for this stance, he was much admired.

== After Wang Jian's reign ==
In 918, Wang Jian died and was succeeded by Wang Zongyan (who then changed his name to Wang Yan). Pan Kang did not return to the imperial government, and there was no reference suggesting that he continued to have input on imperial governance, although his son Pan Zaiying (潘在迎) became one of the well-known Xiake (狎客) — someone who would attend feasts that Wang Yan held to write poems and talk with him at those feasts — for Wang Yan. After Former Shu's destruction by its northeastern neighbor Later Tang in 925, Pan also surrendered to Later Tang and was made the prefect of Shu Prefecture (蜀州, in modern Chengdu). That was the last historical reference to Pan Kang, and it is not known when he died.

== Notes and references ==
- Spring and Autumn Annals of the Ten Kingdoms (十國春秋), vol. 41.
- Zizhi Tongjian, vols. 267, 268.
