= Yu Chuansu =

Yu Chuansu (庾傳素) was an official of the Chinese Five Dynasties and Ten Kingdoms period state Former Shu, serving two terms as chancellor.

== During Wang Jian's reign ==
It is not known when Yu Chuansu was born or what his familial origins were. It was said that while he served under Former Shu's founding emperor Wang Jian, he served initially as the prefect of Shu Prefecture (蜀州, in modern Chengdu, Sichuan). As of 910, Yu was serving as deputy minister of census (戶部侍郎, Hubu Shilang) and the acting director of treasury (判度支, Pan Duzhi) when Wang Jian gave him the title of Zhongshu Shilang (中書侍郎, deputy head of the legislative bureau of government (中書省, Zhongshu Sheng)) and gave him the designation Tong Zhongshu Menxia Pingzhangshi (同中書門下平章事), making him a chancellor.

In 917, the powerful eunuch Tang Wenyi (唐文扆) was in conflict with Yu's political ally Mao Wenxi the director of palace communications, and when Mao played music at a feast held in preparation for the marriage between Mao's daughter and Yu's son without previously informing the emperor, Tang used the opportunity to accuse Mao of crimes. Mao was exiled, while Yu was removed from his chancellor position and made the minister of public works (工部尚書, Gongbu Shangshu). He was later made the minister of defense (兵部尚書, Bingbu Shangshu).

== During Wang Yan's reign ==
Wang Jian died in 918 and was succeeded by his son Wang Zongyan who was later renamed Wang Yan. Later, Wang Yan made Yu Chuansu Zhongshu Shilang and chancellor again, as well as gave him the honorary title of Taizi Shaobao (太子少保). It was said that Yu was without significant accomplishments in this second term as chancellor. In particular, he and fellow chancellor Wang Kai were described as concerned with protecting themselves and failing to correct the wasteful and frivolous ways of the young emperor. After Former Shu was invaded by its northeastern neighbor Later Tang in 925, Yu followed Wang Yan in surrendering to Later Tang and was made a prefectural prefect. Nothing further was said about him in history, including when he died.

== Notes and references ==
- Spring and Autumn Annals of the Ten Kingdoms, vol. 41.
- Zizhi Tongjian, vols. 267, 270, 272.
