= Tianhan =

Tianhan (天漢) was a Chinese era name used by several emperors of China. It may refer to:

- Tianhan (100–97 BC), era name used by Emperor Wu of Han
- Tianhan (917), era name used by Wang Jian, emperor of Former Shu (called Han during that particular year)

== See also ==
- Tian Han (1898–1968), Chinese writer
