= Tomb of Wang Jian =

Yongling (Tomb of Wang Jian)
- The tomb chamber
- Interactive map of Yongling (Tomb of Wang Jian)
- 30°40′34″N 104°02′41″E
- Location: 10 Yongling Road, Chengdu, Sichuan, China

History
- Built: 918

Site notes
- Owner: Wang Jian

The Yongling Mausoleum (Chinese: 永陵; pinyin: Yǒnglíng), commonly known as the tomb of Wang Jian (Chinese: 王建墓), is the burial place of Wang Jian (847–918), the founding emperor of Former Shu. It is located at 10 Yongling Road, Jinniu District, Chengdu, Sichuan, China.

In the Later Tang dynasty (923–937), Emperor Meng Zhixiang issued a decree to protect the tomb. However, the auxiliary buildings of the site decayed from the Northern Song dynasty (960-1127) on. Only the grave mound and the coffin chamber survive. It was excavated between 1940 and 1943 by the archaeologist Feng Hanji and others and confirmed as Wang Jian's tomb. A number of cultural relics were found, which were transferred to Sichuan Museum. It has twice been listed as a cultural relics protection site in Sichuan Province. In 2001 a tomb passage was rebuilt in the style of other Tang dynasty imperial mausoleums.

== Description ==
The Yongling Mausoleum is located at 10 Yongling Road, Jinniu District, Chengdu, Sichuan, China. To date, it is the only ancient Chinese royal tomb found with the coffin chamber above ground. The grave mound is circular, and the coffin chamber is located underneath the middle of the mound. The chamber has three rooms, with a coffin in the middle room and a stone statue of Wang Jian in a sitting position in the room behind.

== History ==
Plan of the tomb of Wang Jian

Wang Jian (847 – July 11, 918), formally Emperor Gaozu, was the founding emperor of the Five Dynasties and Ten Kingdoms period state Former Shu. He died in the first year of the Tianguang period (918 CE) at the age of 72, with a temple name of Gaozu and was buried in Chengdu. In December 918 and again in March 925 (the first year of the Xiankang period), Wang Yan, Wang Jian's successor, visited the tomb to show his respect. In 933 (the fourth year of the Changxing era of the Later Tang dynasty), Meng Zhixiang had the tomb renovated and formally prohibited the cutting of firewood in the nearby area. In 1014 (the 7th year of the Dazhongxiangfu era of the Northern Song dynasty), several of the mausoleum buildings were demolished, and the material used to repair a local Taoist temple named Yuejuhua. The remaining buildings were served as a Buddhist temple named Yongning, renamed Yongqingyuan in 1103 (the second year of the Chongning period of the Northern Song Dynasty). The whole structure was later destroyed by fire, with only the grave mound surviving.

The location of the tomb was not recorded accurately in historical records. The most widespread description of its location was in a poem by Lu You, which described the tomb of Wang Jian along with that of his empress as being located immediately outside the "Old West Gate". The poem described the grave as having already been heavily damaged, stating that only two stone columns, carved with scriptures, and several huge human and horse statues still stood. Since then, records of the tomb in local chronicles followed Lu You's description.

== Excavation ==
In 1940, brick walls of the grave were discovered during the construction of a bomb shelter. The discovery drew the attention of Feng Hanji, an archaeology professor at Huaxi University. After an investigation, Feng identified the mound as an ancient tomb. Due to conditions at the time, the exposed parts of the site had to be temporarily closed, and an excavation plan was not developed until the establishment of the Sichuan Museum in 1941. On September 15, 1942, the excavation of the tomb began, led by Feng Hanji and Liu Fuzhang. The tomb was filled with silt, and archaeologists were only able to clear a 3-meter path to the chambers. During the excavation, several items made of jade were unearthed and it was determined that the tomb was the Mausoleum of Wang Jian.

The site of the tomb is close to the location given in Lu You's poem, but the archaeologists did not find the huge stone human statue it described. The sinologist, Michael Sullivan joined the excavation; he was mistaken by a middle school student for a foreign grave robber, reported to government officials, and detained along with other archaeologists. The excavation work was interrupted by this misunderstanding. In November 1942, the excavation work was temporarily suspended. On March 1, 1943, the archaeologist Wu Jinding and Wang Zhenduo, an expert in museology, launched the second stage of the excavation. This stage focused on the southern part of the grave mound and the main chamber. The excavation discovered traces of grave robbing and unearthed a large number of cultural relics. On September 21, all excavation work was completed. The cultural relics were transferred to Sichuan Museum, and the mound was closed again. In 1971, when building a house 300 metres (980 ft) to the south of the tomb, a member of the Fuqin production brigade of Chengdu Jinniu District found a stone statue 3.18 metres (10.4 ft) high, confirming the Lu You's description.

== Recent developments ==
The tomb of Wang Jian has twice been listed as a cultural relics protection site in Sichuan Province: in 1956 and 1980. In 1961, it was listed as a national key cultural relics protection site. In 2001 a tomb passage was rebuilt on the south side of the Wang Jian Tomb, using materials and techniques found in other Tang dynasty imperial mausoleums; and several stone statues were added by the Yongling Museum.

== In popular culture ==
The grave is widely believed to be the location where Sima Xiangru and Zhuge Liang played the qin, a traditional Chinese musical instrument. This caused the grave mound to be named Fuqintai, meaning the place where qin are played.
