= Tang Daoxi =

Tang Daoxi (唐道襲) (died August 21, 913) was an official and general of the Chinese Five Dynasties and Ten Kingdoms period state Former Shu. He was a close associate of Former Shu's founding emperor Wang Jian and held great power during Wang Jian's reign. This brought him into conflict with Wang Jian's son and crown prince Wang Yuanying. In 913, with both he and Wang Yuanying suspecting the other of being ready to launch a mutiny, their forces engaged in a battle at the Former Shu capital Chengdu. He was defeated by Wang Yuanying and killed in battle.

== During Tang Dynasty ==
It is not known when Tang Daoxi was born, but it is known that he was from Lang Prefecture (閬州, in modern Nanchong, Sichuan). His father Tang Feng (唐峯) was a merchant. It is not clear when he first became a follower of Wang Jian, but it was said that he was initially a dancer boy for Wang and became favored by Wang for his handsomeness, but later became even more trusted by Wang due to his ability to plan and carry out plots. As of 902, by which time Wang was the military governor (Jiedushi) of Xichuan Circuit (西川, headquartered in modern Chengdu, Sichuan) and controlled several other nearby circuits, Tang was serving as the commander of Wang's cavalry guards. That year, when Wang Jian became suspicious of his officer and adoptive son Wang Zongdi, it was Tang whom Wang Jian ordered to get Wang Zongdi drunk and then strangle Wang Zongdi. At some point, Tang became the defender (防禦使, Fangyushi) of his home prefecture Lang Prefecture.

== During Former Shu ==
In 907, Tang Dynasty's last emperor Emperor Ai was forced to yield the throne to the major warlord Zhu Quanzhong the military governor of Xuanwu Circuit (宣武, headquartered in modern Kaifeng, Henan), ending Tang and starting a new Later Liang with Zhu as its Emperor Taizu. Wang Jian, along with several other regional warlords (Li Maozhen the military governor of Fengxiang Circuit (鳳翔, headquartered in modern Baoji, Shaanxi), Li Keyong the military governor of Hedong Circuit (河東, headquartered in modern Taiyuan, Shanxi), and Yang Wo the military governor of Huainan Circuit (淮南, headquartered in modern Yangzhou, Jiangsu)) refused to recognize the new Later Liang emperor, and Wang Jian and Yang issued a declaration urging the people to rise against Later Liang. However, when they did not receive a positive response from other regional governors, Wang Jian decided to declare himself emperor of a new state of Former Shu. As part of a series of personnel commissions after he declared himself emperor, Wang recalled Tang Daoxi from Lang Prefecture to serve as the director of palace communications (Shumishi).

Tang soon came into a conflict with Wang Zongji, the oldest of Wang Jian's adoptive sons, who initially became a chancellor in Wang Jian's regime and was trying to aggrandize his power based on his past military accomplishments. Wang Zongji was said to be arrogant, and he offended Tang by continuing to call Tang by his name despite Tang's having reached the high position of director of palace communications. Tang thus resented him, but outwardly tried to appear friendly and subservient to Wang Zongji. Wang Jian himself eventually became apprehensive of Wang Zongji since Wang Zongji had many associates, and therefore, in 908, gave Wang Zongji the highly honorable position Taishi (太師) but removed him from chancellorship. Resentful of his removal, Wang Zongji was said to continue to foster his group of followers and consider a coup. Further, challenging Wang Jian's initial failure to name an heir — as Wang Jian created his second son Wang Zongyi the Prince of Sui but did not create him crown prince (Wang Jian's oldest biological son Wang Zongren (王宗仁) was disabled and therefore considered by Wang Jian to be unfit to serve as heir), Wang Zongji submitted an irreverent petition to Wang Jian:

I, your subject, am a major official in title, but close to you as your oldest son. Whatever happens to the state and the imperial house is for me to share. Right now, no crown prince has been named, and this will surely bring disturbances. If Your Imperial Majesty believes that Zongyi's abilities are fit for him to serve as heir, you should create him crown prince as soon as possible. You can then make me the supreme commander of the armed forces, to command the six armies. If you believe that the times are difficult and that Zongyi is too young, your subject will not dare to yield those responsibilities. Since Your Imperial Majesty has taken the throne and faces the south, you should entrust the matters of the military to your subject. I urge that you establish a headquarters for the supreme commander, with seals to command the six armies, and put your subject in charge of giving marching orders to the armies. The Crown Prince can attend to your meals in the morning and the evening, while your subject can command the soldiers to protect you. This is important for your eternal realm. May Your Imperial Majesty rule on this.

Wang Jian was incensed, but did not initially publicly express displeasure. When he discussed the matter with Tang, Tang, in order to inflame him more, stated, "Zongji's reputation is so grand such that both people inside and outside the palace fear him. He would be a suitable commander." This caused Wang Jian to be further suspicious of Wang Zongji. Soon thereafter, on an occasion Wang Zongji was in the palace to greet Wang Jian, Wang Zongji spoke arrogantly. When Wang Jian rebuked him, he refused to yield. Wang Jian, in anger, ordered the guards to batter him to death.

Soon thereafter, Wang Jian created Wang Zongyi crown prince. Tang thereafter developed an enmity with the crown prince as well, as Wang Zongyi liked to humiliate the Former Shu officials and did humiliate Tang by apparently repeatedly referring to Tang's past as a dancing boy. Tang and Wang Zongyi made accusations against each other, and Wang Jian, not wanting to see this conflict growing larger, in 910 commissioned Tang the military governor of Shannan West Circuit (山南西道, headquartered in modern Hanzhong, Shaanxi) and gave him the honorary chancellor designation of Tong Zhongshu Menxia Pingzhangshi (同中書門下平章事). Tang initially recommended Zheng Xu (鄭頊) to succeed himself as the director of palace communications, but once Zheng took office, he began to investigate Tang's brothers for embezzlement. Tang, in fear, made a report to Wang Jian stating that Zheng was intolerant and impatient, and should not be director of palace communications. Wang Jian therefore replaced Zheng with Pan Kang.

In spring 911, angry that Li Maozhen's state of Qi had gathered troops near its borders with Former Shu, Wang Jian decided to launch an attack on Qi. He commissioned his adoptive son Wang Zongkan (王宗侃) as the overall commander of the operations, and made Tang one of the three commanders under Wang Zongkan, along with his adoptive sons Wang Zongyou (王宗祐) and Wang Zonghe (王宗賀). Meanwhile, in summer 911, Qi forces made an exploratory attack on Xingyuan Municipality (興元), the capital for Shannan West (by this point known simply as Shannan); Tang repelled them. However, in fall 911, Li Maozhen sent the general Liu Zhijun and his nephew Li Jichong (李繼崇) to attack Former Shu, engaging the Former Shu force commanded by Wang Zongkan at Qingni Height (青泥嶺, in modern Hanzhong) and defeating them. Tang fled back to Xingyuan, while Wang Zongkan and Wang Zonghe fled to Anyuan Base (安遠軍, in modern Hanzhong). Liu and Li Jichong put Anyuan and Xingyuan under siege, and Tang's staff advised him to abandon Xingyuan. Tang, pointing out that abandoning Xingyuan would cause Anyuan and Li Prefecture (利州, in modern Guangyuan, Sichuan) to fall as well, vowed to defend Xingyuan to his death. Wang Jian, hearing of the defeat at Qingni Height, sent his nephew Wang Zonghui (王宗鐬) and adoptive son Wang Zongbo (王宗播) to aid Anyuan Base. Subsequently, they, along with Tang, counterattacked and defeated Qi forces. When Wang Jian himself subsequently arrived with a relief force as well, Qi forces withdrew.

In 913, Tang was recalled from Shannan and again assumed the position of director of palace communications. This drew a vehement opposition from Wang Zongyi (who had been renamed Wang Yuanying), who accused him of crimes. Wang Jian was displeased with Wang Yuanying's accusations, but still relieved Tang from his position and made him Taizi Shaobao (太子少保), a senior advisor to Wang Yuanying.

In fall 913, Wang Jian planned a vacation away from Chengdu for the Qixi Festival (on August 11 that year). The night before (August 10), Wang Yuanying held a feast for the imperial princes and high-level officials, but three invitees — Wang Jian's adoptive son Wang Zonghan (王宗翰) the Prince of Ji, and the officials Pan Qiao (who succeeded Tang Daoxi as the director of palace communications) and Mao Wenxi (the chief imperial scholar) — did not attend. Wang Yuanying, in anger, accused Pan and Mao in absentia of alienating his brothers from him. Meanwhile, Wang Yuanying's trusted officers Xu Yao (徐瑤) and Chang Qian (常謙) were gazing at Tang. Tang, in fear, fled from the feast.

The morning next day (August 11, the date of the Qixi Festival), Wang Yuanying went to see his father Wang Jian and accused Pan and Mao of alienating him from his brothers. Wang Jian, believing the accusations, ordered Pan and Mao demoted, making Pan Kang (潘炕) the new director of palace communications. However, after Wang Yuanying then left the palace, Tang arrived, and Tang made the counteraccusation that Wang Yuanying was planning to rebel, and, as part of his planning, was planning to put the princes and the officials under arrest. Wang Jian, with his suspicions aroused, cancelled the Qixi vacation plans. Further, he agreed to Tang's request to mobilize the regular troops to defend the palace (rather than the imperial guards, who were formally under Wang Yuanying's command). Upon hearing that the regular troops had been mobilized, Wang Yuanying mobilized his own Tianwu Army (天武軍). He arrested Pan Qiao and Mao and almost battered them to death, in addition to arresting Pan Jiao (潘嶠) the mayor of Chengdu.

The next day (August 12), Xu, Chang, and Yan Lin (嚴璘), under Wang Yuanying's direction, attacked Tang's forces. Tang initially resisted, but tried to retreat when an arrow hit him. The crown prince's troops then routed his, killing him, and many of the troops under Tang were killed. However, subsequently, the imperial guards defeated Wang Yuanying's troops, and he fled and went into hiding. He was eventually killed in hiding and reduced to commoner rank posthumously, while Tang was posthumously honored Taishi and given the posthumous name Zhongzhuang (忠壯, "faithful and died on the field").

== Notes and references ==
- Spring and Autumn Annals of the Ten Kingdoms (十國春秋), vol. 46.
- Zizhi Tongjian, vols. 263, 266, 267, 268.
