= Wang Jian (Former Shu) =

Emperor of Former Shu from 907 to 918

Emperor Gaozu of Former Shu 前蜀高祖
- Emperor of the Great Shu
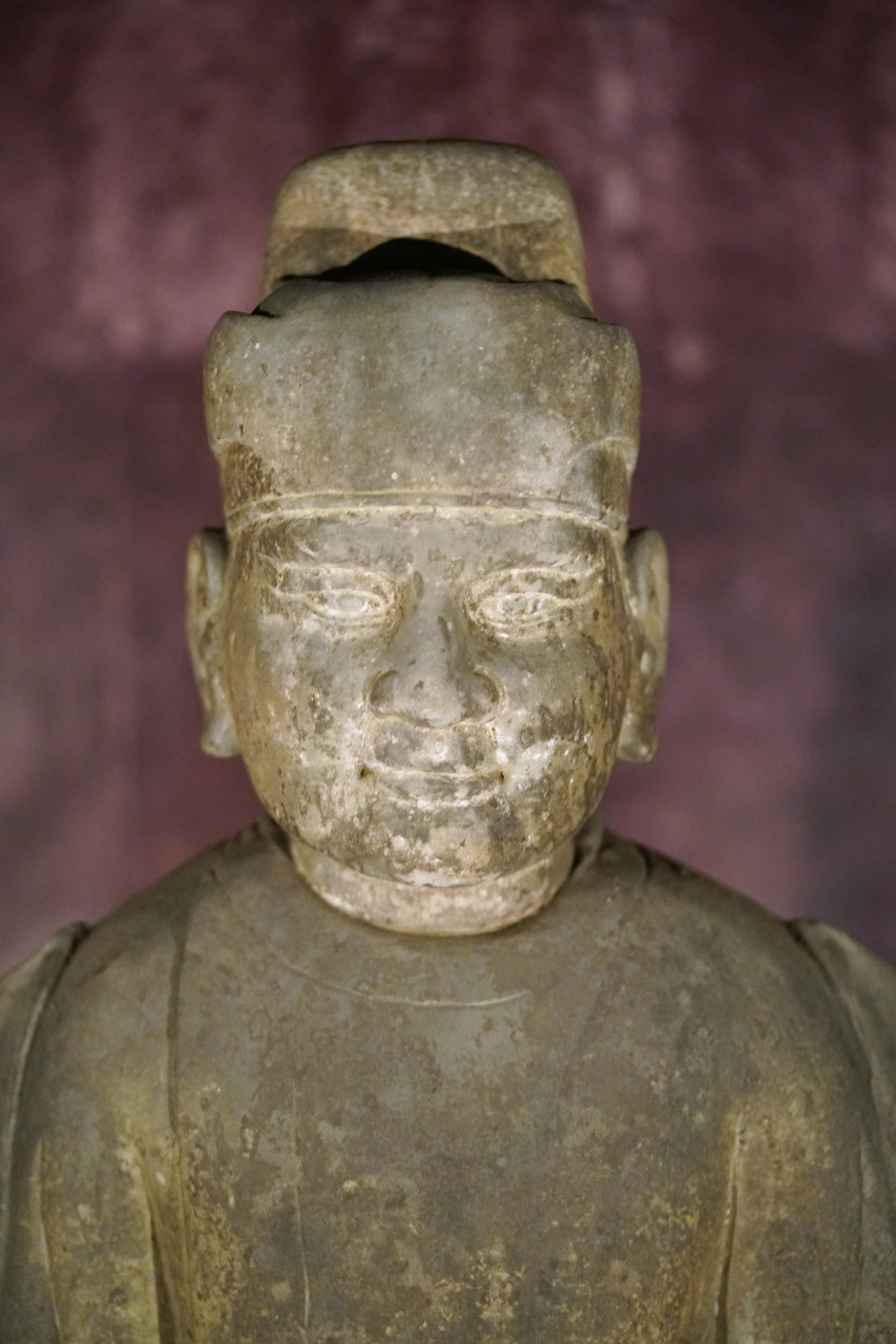
- Statue of Wang Jian found in his tomb

1st Emperor of Former Shu
- Reign: November 3, 907 – July 11, 918
- Successor: Wang Yan

Prince of Shu (蜀王)
- Reign: 903 – November 3, 907

jiedushi of Jiannan and Xichuan Circuit (劍南西川節度使)
- Tenure: 891 – November 3, 907
- Predecessor: Chen Jingxuan
- Successor: Zhou Xiang (as the Intendant of Chengdu)
- Born: 847
- Died: July 11, 918 (Aged 70-71)
- Burial: Yong Mausoleum (永陵)
Full name
- Family name: Wáng; Given name: Jiàn (建)
Era dates
- Tiānfù (天復): 907; Wǔchéng (武成): 908-910; Yǒngpíng (永平): 911-915; Tōngzhèng (通正): 916; Tiānhàn (天漢): 917; Guāngtiān (光天): 918
Posthumous name
- Emperor Shenwu Shengwen Xiaode Minghui (神武聖文孝德明惠皇帝)
Temple name
- Gāozǔ (高祖)
- House: Wang
- Dynasty: Former Shu

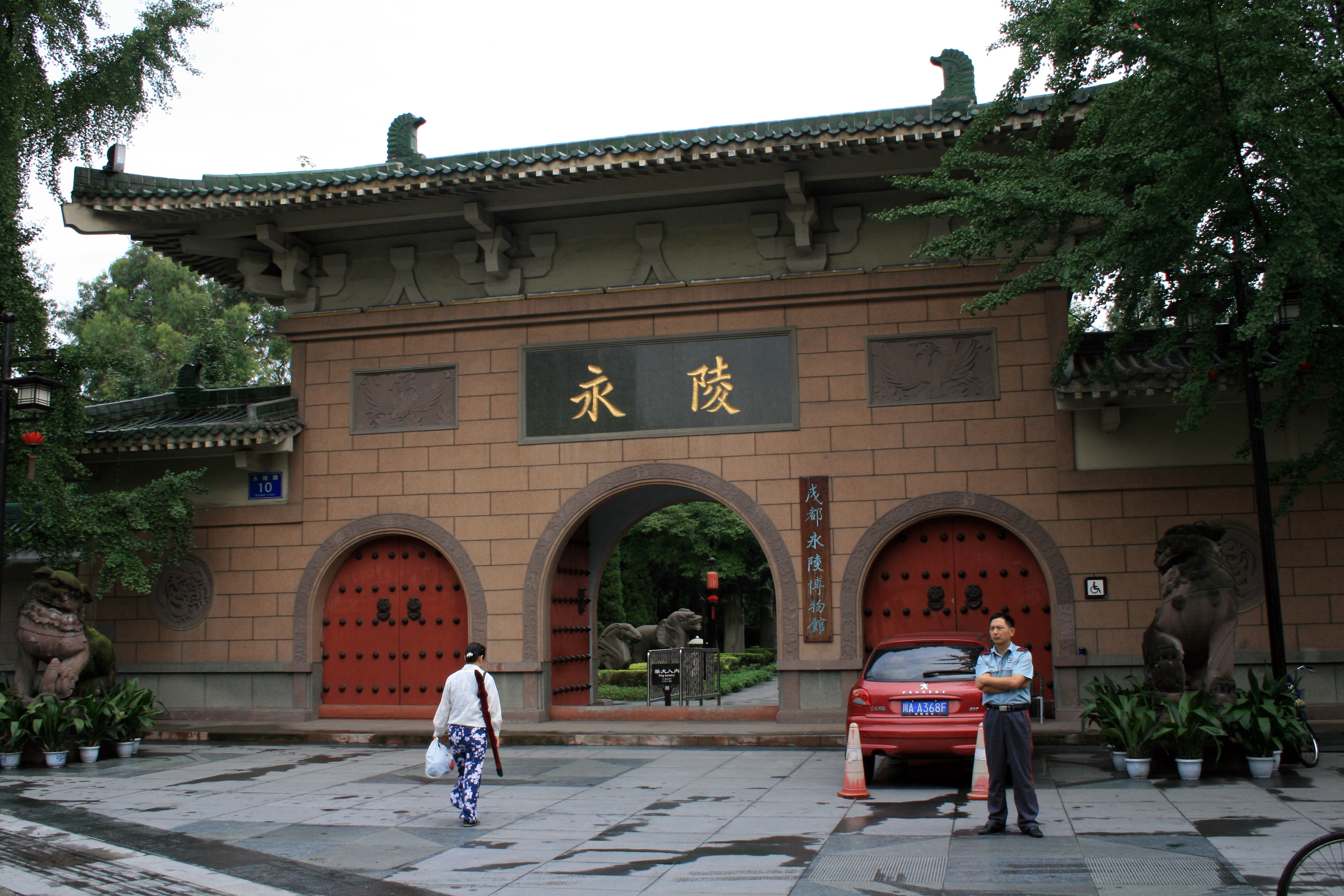
The gate of Wang Jian's tomb (Yong Mausoleum), in Chengdu

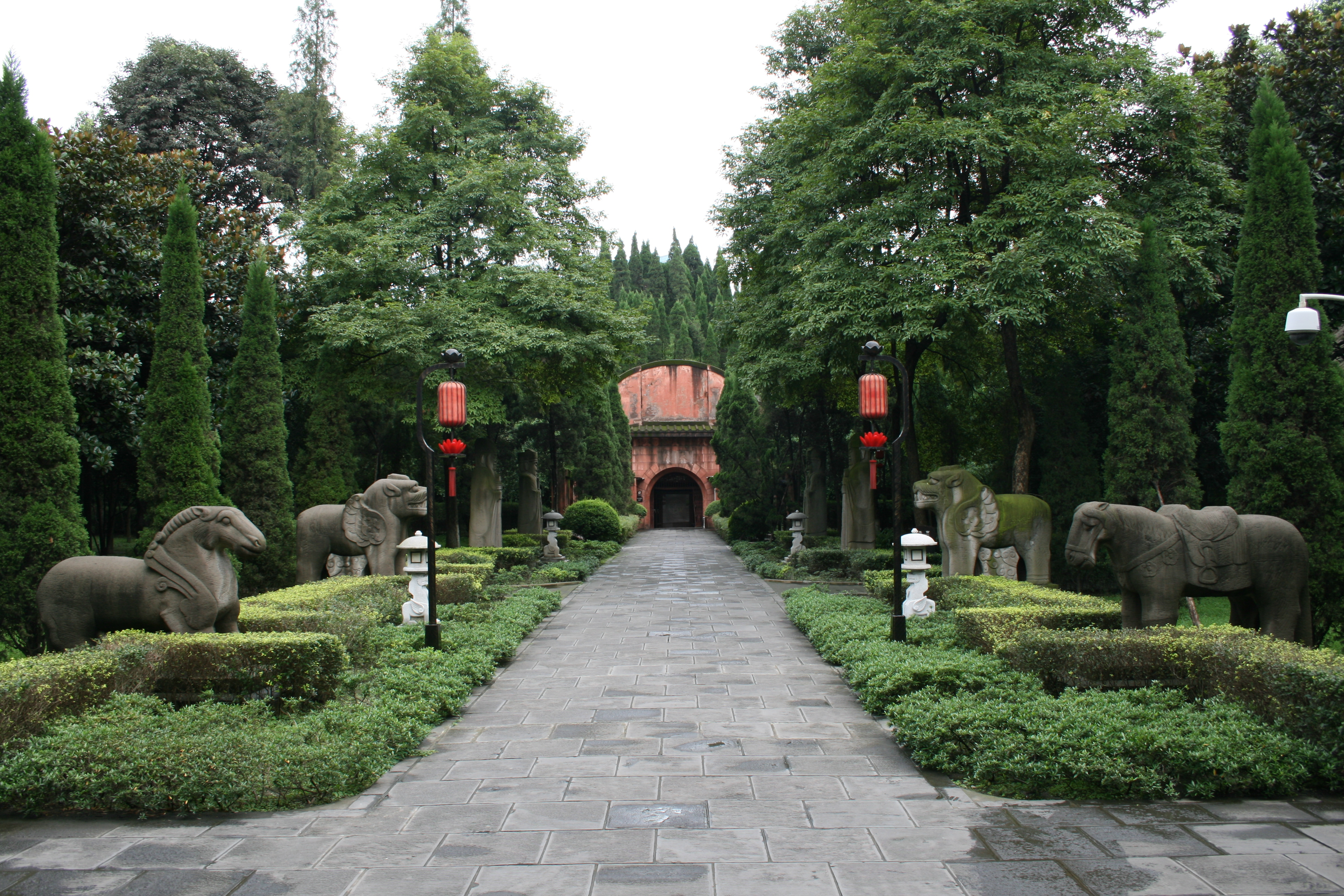
Wang Jian's tomb

Wang Jian (Chinese: 王建; 847 – July 11, 918), courtesy name Guangtu (光圖), also known by his temple name as the Emperor Gaozu of Former Shu (前蜀高祖), was the founding emperor of the Chinese Former Shu dynasty during the Five Dynasties and Ten Kingdoms period. He started his career as an army officer under the Tang dynasty eunuch generals Yang Fuguang and Tian Lingzi, eventually seizing control of the modern Sichuan and Chongqing region, founding his state after Tang's destruction.

== Background ==
Wang Jian was born in 847, during the reign of Emperor Xuānzong of Tang. He was from Wuyang (舞陽, in modern Luohe, Henan), and was said to be ambitious and alert in his youth. However, he was also described to be a hoodlum, abandoning his ancestral craft of baking to be involved in butchering cattle, stealing donkeys, and privateering in salt. His father died while he was still a commoner. At one point, for misdeeds, he was incarcerated at the jail at Xuchang (許昌, in modern Xuchang, Henan), the capital of Zhongwu Circuit (忠武), which Wuyang sat in, but the jailers privately released him. He subsequently stayed with the monk Chuhong (處洪) in the Wudang Mountains, and Chuhong encouraged him to change his ways, predicting that there would be great accomplishments in his future. He thus joined the Zhongwu Circuit army and became an officer under then-military governor (Jiedushi) Du Shenquan.

== Early career ==
=== Service under Yang Fuguang ===
As of 881, the major agrarian rebel Huang Chao had captured the Tang capital Chang'an, forcing then-reigning Emperor Xizong to flee to Chengdu. Zhongwu's then-military governor Zhou Ji initially submitted to Huang, who established a new state of Qi as its emperor, but at the urging by the eunuch general Yang Fuguang redeclared allegiance to Tang in summer 881. Yang took 8,000 Zhongwu troops and organized them into eight corps, commanded by Lu Yanhong, Jin Hui (晉暉), Wang Jian, Han Jian, Zhang Zao (張造), Li Shitai (李師泰), and Pang Cong (龐從) respectively. He then took the troops northwest to join the other Tang troops in campaign against Huang.

=== Service under Lu Yanhong ===
Yang Fuguang died in 883 while stationed at Hezhong Circuit (河中, in modern Yuncheng, Shanxi) and still fighting against Huang. Instead of continuing to fight against Huang, Lu Yanhong decided to take his troops and rove around the region, pillaging as he went. Wang Jian, Han Jian, Zhang Zao, Jin Hui, and Li Shitai followed him as well. Later in 883, Lu captured Xingyuan (興元, in modern Hanzhong, Shaanxi) the capital of Shannan West Circuit (山南西道), expelling the military governor Niu Xu (牛勗) and claiming the title of acting military governor. He commissioned Wang and the other Zhongwu corps commanders as prefects within Shannan West, but did not allow them to actually report to their prefectures. He was particularly suspicious of Wang and Han because of their deep friendship, but wanting to comfort them, he often treated them well. Wang and Han realized Lu's intentions, however, and in fall 884, with Emperor Xizong's trusted eunuch Tian Lingzi secretly tempting them with offers of good treatment, they, along with Zhang, Jin, and Li, abandoned Lu and fled to Chengdu to serve under Tian.

=== Service under Tian Lingzi ===
Tian Lingzi subsequently reorganized the Zhongwu troops that Wang Jian and the others commanded into a group of imperial guards directly under Tian's command, while sending imperial troops to attack Lu Yanhong, defeating him and forcing him to abandon Shannan West. Tian also adopted Wang and the others as his sons. Meanwhile, with Huang Chao having been defeated earlier, Emperor Xizong returned to Chang'an, in spring 885, with Tian and his troops accompanying him.

Soon after Emperor Xizong returned to Chang'an, however, Tian got into a major dispute with Wang Chongrong the military governor of Hezhong over control of two salt ponds at Hezhong, which Tian wanted to use the revenue from to support the imperial Shence Armies. Wang Chongrong refused to yield control, and soon, a full confrontation between Tian and his allies (Zhu Mei the military governor of Jingnan Circuit (靜難, headquartered in modern Xianyang, Shaanxi) and Li Changfu the military governor of Fengxiang Circuit (鳳翔, headquartered in modern Baoji, Shaanxi)) and Wang Chongrong and his ally Li Keyong the military governor of Hedong Circuit (河東, headquartered in modern Taiyuan, Shanxi) occurred. In winter 885, Wang Chongrong's and Li Keyong's forces defeated those of Tian, Zhu, and Li Changfu. As Li Keyong's forces approached Chang'an, Tian escorted Emperor Xizong and fled again, initially to Fengxiang and then to Xingyuan when Zhu and Li Changfu also turned against him. During this flight, with Emperor Xizong's flight path blocked by waves of refugees, Wang Jian and Jin cleared the path, killing all in their way, to allow Emperor Xizong through, and during the confusion, Emperor Xizong had Wang Jian bear the imperial seal, and at night slept on Wang Jian's knees.

With Tian realizing that the whole empire was against him by this point, he resigned while Emperor Xizong was at Xingyuan, recommending Yang Fuguang's brother Yang Fugong to succeed him as the commander of the Shence Armies, while having himself commissioned as the eunuch monitor of Xichuan Circuit (西川, headquartered at Chengdu) to join his brother Chen Jingxuan the military governor of Xichuan. Yang Fugong, not wanting Tian's trusted officers near him, had Wang, Jin, Zhang, and Li Shitai all sent out to prefectures to serve as prefect, with Wang becoming the prefect of Li Prefecture (利州, in modern Guangyuan, Sichuan). After Yang Fuguang's adoptive son Yang Shouliang became military governor of Shannan West in spring 887, Wang became titularly his subordinate.

=== Service under Yang Shouliang ===
Yang Shouguang was apprehensive about Wang Jian's fighting ability and tried to summon him to Xingyuan several times, but Wang, fearful of Yang's intentions, refused the summons. At the suggestion of his subordinate Zhou Xiang, who pointed out that Li Prefecture was not an ideal defense position, he attacked Lang Prefecture (閬州, in modern Nanchong, Sichuan), expelled the prefect Yang Maoshi (楊茂實), and took over Lang, claiming the greater title of defender. At the advice of Zhang Qianyu (張虔裕) and Qiwu Jian (綦毋諫), he submitted humble petitions to Emperor Xizong and comforted the people. He also entered into friendly relations with Gu Yanlang the military governor of Dongchuan Circuit (東川, headquartered in modern Mianyang, Sichuan), as the two were colleagues previously at the Shence Armies.

=== Campaign against Chen Jingxuan ===
Chen Jingxuan, however, feared the close alliance between Gu Yanlang and Wang Jian and was worried that Gu and Wang would attack him. He discussed the situation with Tian Lingzi. Tian opined that he, as Wang's adoptive father, could summon Wang and make him serve under Chen. Chen agreed and allowed Tian to do so in winter 887. Wang, after receiving the summons, was initially happy about the summons. He, leaving most of his family at Dongchuan's capital Zi Prefecture (梓州) with Gu, took 2,000 men, along with his nephew Wang Zonghui (王宗鐬) and his adoptive sons Wang Zongyao (王宗瑤), Wang Zongbi, Wang Zongkan (王宗侃), Wang Zongji, and Wang Zongbian (王宗弁), and headed toward Chengdu. While Wang was en route to Chengdu, however, Chen's subordinate Li Ai (李乂) convinced Chen that Wang was not to be trusted, and Chen decided to try to stop Wang's advance. Wang, in anger, refused, defeating officers that Chen sent to stop him and advancing all the way to Chengdu. He was unable to capture it quickly, even with the assistance of Gu Yanlang's brother Gu Yanhui, so both he and Gu Yanhui withdrew to Han Prefecture (漢州, in modern Deyang, Sichuan). Their hostilities continued, despite efforts by Emperor Xizong to mediate. It was said that Wang's army pillaged all 12 prefectures of Xichuan Circuit.

However, Wang's attacks were stifled by Chengdu's strong defenses, and his supplies soon ran low. By summer 888, he considered abandoning the campaign altogether, but after Zhou Xiang and Qiwu Jian convinced him otherwise, continued the campaign. He, believing that he needed imperial sanction in order to succeed in the campaign, had Zhou draft a petition for him to Emperor Zhaozong — Emperor Xizong's brother, who succeeded Emperor Xizong after Emperor Xizong died early in 888 — asking to be given the rich Qiong Prefecture while asking the emperor to send a new military governor of Xichuan, offering to assist the new military governor. Gu Yanlang also submitted a petition requesting that Chen be moved from his post. Emperor Zhaozong, who had previous grudges against Tian and Chen for Tian's ill treatment of him while he was an imperial prince, issued an edict summoning Chen back to Chang'an to serve as an imperial guard general, while making the chancellor Wei Zhaodu the new military governor of Xichuan. When Chen subsequently refused the summons, Emperor Zhaozong stripped him of all of his titles and put Wei in charge of the operations against him, with Yang Shouliang, Wang, and Gu assisting him. Emperor Zhaozong also carved out four prefectures from Xichuan and made it into a new Yongping Circuit, with its capital at Qiong, for Wang to serve as military governor. In spring 890, Wang put Qiong Prefecture under siege. Around the same time, Wei arrived in Chengdu's vicinity, and Wang outwardly honored him greatly. A number of prefectures began to submit to Wang, and in winter 890, Qiong fell to him, allowing him to use Qiong as his basis of operations.

However, in spring 891, with imperial forces having recently conducted a failed campaign against Li Keyong and the imperial treasury drained, Emperor Zhaozong decided to abandon the campaign against Chen. He restored Chen's titles and ordered Gu and Wang to return to their posts at Dongchuan and Yongping. Wang, believing that Chengdu was on the verge of falling, decided to disobey the imperial orders and continue the campaign. He intimidated Wei by having Dongchuan soldiers arrest and execute Wei's associate Luo Bao (駱保) on charges of corruption, and Wei transferred the command of the army to him. Wang continued the siege against Chengdu, and a famine began in the city. In fall 891, after Wang made assurances that he would continue to respect Chen and honor Tian as a father, Chen and Tian surrendered Chengdu. Emperor Zhaozong soon made Wang the military governor of Xichuan, merging Yongping back into Xichuan.

== As military governor of Xichuan ==
=== Campaign against Dongchuan ===
It was said that Wang Jian, after he took over Xichuan, ruled it diligently, listened to good advice, promoted capable people, put people in rightful positions, and was humble and frugal. However, he was also said to be suspicious, and that many subordinates with accomplishments suffered deaths due to his suspicions of them.

Around the same time that Wang took over Xichuan, his ally Gu Yanlang died, and Gu Yanhui succeeded Gu Yanlang as the acting military governor of Dongchuan. Emperor Zhaozong was ready to commission Gu Yanhui as the full military governor, but Yang Shouliang reacted by sending his brother Yang Shouhou (楊守厚) to attack Dongchuan, trying to take it over. Wang sent his officers Hua Hong, Li Jian (李簡), Wang Zongkan, and Wang Zongbi to aid Gu — with secret instructions to, once they repelled the Yangs' attack, seize Gu Yanhui and take over Dongchuan at a feast that Gu would surely be holding in their honor. After Wang Zongkan defeated Yang Shouhou and forced his withdrawal, Gu was ready to hold such a feast — but Wang Zongbi leaked the plot to Gu, causing Gu to cancel the feast and eventually ending the alliance between Wang and Gu. Meanwhile, Tian Lingzi's and Chen Jingxuan's remaining subordinate Yang Sheng (楊晟), who continued to hold Peng Prefecture (彭州, in modern Chengdu) and holding out against Wang, tried to jointly attack Wang with Yang Shouliang, but Li Jian repelled Yang Sheng and killed his officer Lü Yao (呂堯) in spring 892. Wang then sent his nephew Wang Zongyu (王宗裕), Wang Zongkan, Wang Zongyao, and Hua to attack Peng Prefecture. When Yang Shouliang tried to send troops to aid Yang Sheng, Hua intimidated Yang Shouliang's officer Fu Zhao (符昭) into withdrawing. Hua subsequently attacked Lang Prefecture and defeated Yang Shouliang there, too.

Meanwhile, in 893, Gu entered into an alliance with Li Maozhen the military governor of Fengxiang Circuit, and Li Maozhen sent troops to aid Gu. However, after Wang then defeated Fengxiang and Dongchuan troops at Li Prefecture, Gu sought peace against with Wang, claiming to be willing to break relations with Li Maozhen, and Wang agreed. Around the same time, Emperor Zhaozong bestowed on Wang the honorary chancellor title of Tong Zhongshu Menxia Pingzhangzhi (同中書門下平章事). Meanwhile, Wang had repeatedly sought permission to execute Chen and Tian, and when imperial permission never came, Wang executed them anyway.

By 894, Peng Prefecture was suffering from a famine due to the siege that Wang's forces had placed on it. Yang Sheng could not hold the defense any further, and it fell. Yang Sheng tried to fight still, but was killed in battle. His territory was merged back into Xichuan. Meanwhile, when Yang Shouhou, who was then the prefect of Mian Prefecture (綿州, in modern Mianyang) died in fall 894, with Yang Shouliang having been defeated by Li Maozhen by that point and his territory largely taken by Li Maozhen, Yang Shouhou's officer Chang Zairong (常再榮) surrendered Mian to Wang.

In 895, Li Maozhen, Han Jian (who was then the military governor of Zhenguo Circuit (鎮國, in modern Weinan, Shaanxi)), and Wang Xingyu the military governor of Jingnan Circuit, jointly attacked Chang'an, seizing and killing the former chancellors Wei Zhaodu and Li Xi (whom they considered hostile to their agenda). In reaction, Li Keyong launched his troops and headed for Chang'an, claiming to be coming to the emperor's aid. Wang also launched his troops, put Wang Zongyao in command, and had them stationed at Mian Prefecture, claiming to be coming to the emperor's aid as well. Wang then claimed that Gu was cutting off his path and declared a campaign against Gu. (Meanwhile, Li Keyong defeated and killed Wang Xingyu, forcing Li Maozhen and Han to, for the time being, resubmit to the imperial government.) Hua spearheaded Wang's attack against Dongchuan, and over the next few years, Wang's Xichuan forces gradually stripped Gu's territory prefecture by prefecture, despite Emperor Zhaozong's attempt to mediate. In 896, when Li Maozhen again attacked Chang'an, forcing Emperor Zhaozong to flee to Zhenguo to depend on Han, Wang submitted a petition for Emperor Zhaozong to move the capital to Chengdu, while Yang Xingmi the military governor of Huainan Circuit (淮南, headquartered in modern Yangzhou, Jiangsu) submitted a petition for Emperor Zhaozong to move the capital to Huainan; neither idea was implemented.

In 897, Wang again launched a major attack on Dongchuan, commanded by Hua and another adoptive son, Wang Zongyou (王宗祐), while sending Wang Zongjin (王宗謹) to attack Fengxiang to cut off any relief forces that might come from Fengxiang, and Wang Zongjin defeated Li Maozhen's adoptive son Li Jihui. When Li Maozhen subsequently sent Li Jizhao (李繼昭) to try to relieve Dongchuan, Wang Jian's adoptive son Wang Zongbo (王宗播) defeated and captured him. Around the same time, Wang Zongkan and Wang Zongruan (王宗阮) captured the Three Gorges region, opening a trade path to the east down the Yangtze River.

In summer 897, Wang Jian took 50,000 men and joined the attack against Dongchuan himself. Li Maozhen reacted by submitting a petition against Wang Jian for failing to follow imperial orders to stop his attacks against Gu. Emperor Zhaozong, wanting to exploit the situation himself, issued an edict demoting Wang to be the prefect of Nan Prefecture (南州, in modern Chongqing), while naming Li Maozhen the new military governor of Xichuan and Li Sizhou (李嗣周) the Prince of Qin as the new military governor of Fengxiang — hoping to take control of Fengxiang back into imperial hands. Both Wang and Li Maozhen refused the orders, and Li Maozhen reacted by blocking Li Sizhou's advance, forcing Li Sizhou to return to Zhenguo. Emperor Zhaozong soon thereafter restored Wang Jian's titles.

Wang Jian's siege of Zi Prefecture put Gu in dire straits. In winter 897, Gu had his adoptive son Gu Yao (顧瑤) kill his entire family and then commit suicide. Wang Jian took over Dongchuan and made Hua (whom he formally took as an adoptive son, with the new name of Wang Zongdi) the acting military governor of Dongchuan. The imperial government initially tried to make the official Liu Chongwang (劉崇望) the military governor of Dongchuan, but upon hearing that Wang Jian had already commissioned Wang Zongdi, gave up the attempt and allowed Wang Zongdi to take over as acting military governor (and later, full military governor). (Subsequently, at Wang Zongdi's suggestion (that Dongchuan was too large to be a single circuit), Wang Jian requested, and the imperial government approved, the division of Dongchuan into two circuits, with five prefectures carved out into a Wuxin Circuit (武信), with its headquarters at Sui Prefecture (遂州, in modern Suining, Sichuan).)

=== After seizing Dongchuan ===
In spring 900, Emperor Zhaozong gave Wang Jian the greater honorary chancellor title of Zhongshu Ling (中書令). Soon thereafter, he also granted Wang Jian the title of commander over Dongchuan and Wuxin as well. He also created Wang the Prince of Langye.

In 901, Wang Zongdi offered to resign on account of illness, and Wang Jian sent Wang Zongyu to Dongchuan to replace him. Later in the year, when the Taoist priest Du Congfa (杜從法) started a rebellion with the people of Chang (昌州, in modern Chongqing), Pu (普州, in modern Ziyang, Sichuan), and He (合州, in modern Chongqing) Prefectures. Wang Jian sent his adoptive son Wang Zong'an to attack Du, but Wang Zongkan subsequently suppressed Du's rebellion.

Late in the year, the eunuch Han Quanhui, fearing that Emperor Zhaozong and the chancellor Cui Yin were planning to massacre the eunuchs, seized Emperor Zhaozong. Cui, in response, summoned Zhu Quanzhong the military governor of Xuanwu Circuit (宣武, headquartered in modern Kaifeng, Henan) to bring an army to Chang'an. As Han was allied with LI Maozhen, he forcibly took Emperor Zhaozong to Fengxiang. Zhu then put Fengxiang under siege, claiming that he wanted to restore the emperor to the proper place in Chang'an. Both Zhu and Li Maozhen sought an alliance with Wang Jian. Wang played both sides — outwardly announcing agreement with Zhu, while secretly sending messengers to Li Maozhen urging him to resist Zhu — and yet at the same time sent Wang Zongji and Wang Zongdi north, seeking to seize the prefectures south of the Qinling Mountains that Li Maozhen still controlled. By spring 902, Li Maozhen's adoptive son Li Jizhong (李繼忠) the military governor of Zhaowu Circuit (昭武, headquartered at Li Prefecture) abandoned Li Prefecture, allowing Xichuan forces to seize it. Subsequently, Wang Zongbo and Wang Zongdi captured Xingyuan, and Li Maozhen's adoptive son Li Jimi (李繼密), then the military governor of Shannan West, was forced to surrender as well. Wang Jian initially made Wang Zongdi the military governor of Shannan West, but subsequently, getting reports from Wang Zongji that made accusations against Wang Zongdi, and fearing that Wang Zongdi was both loved by the soldiers, he summoned Wang Zongdi back to Chengdu and had him strangled. He made another adoptive son, Wang Zonghe (王宗賀), the acting military governor of Shannan West. Subsequently, Li Sijing (李思敬) the military governor of Wuding Circuit (武定, headquartered in modern Hanzhong) surrendered as well. By this point, Wang Jian had captured all of Li Maozhen's former territory south of the Qinling Mountains, partially leading to Li Maozhen's subsequent agreement in 903 with Zhu to kill Han and his associates and to give the emperor to Zhu in return for lifting the siege on Fengxiang. After Emperor Zhaozong returned to Chang'an, Cui and Zhu ordered that all eunuchs be massacred. However, Wang protected Yu Quanyan (魚全禋) the eunuch monitor for Xichuan and the prominent retired eunuch Yan Zunmei (嚴遵美) from execution, instead executing two inmates that he claimed to be Yu and Yan.

Later in 903, Wang Jian entered into a peace agreement with Zhu. Subsequently, Emperor Zhaozong created Wang the greater title of Prince of Shu. Soon thereafter, at the suggestion of his adoptive son Wang Zongben (王宗本), Wang Jian had Wang Zongben lead an army east on the Yangtze River, intending to capture Jingnan Circuit (荊南, headquartered in modern Jingzhou, Hubei). At that time, the military governor of Jingnan, Cheng Rui, had just been killed in battle against Yang Xingmi's forces, and so Cheng's subordinate, Hou Ju (侯矩), surrendered Kui Prefecture (夔州, in modern Chongqing) to Wang Zongben, allowing Wang Jian to take over Kui, Zhong (忠州, in modern Chongqing), Wan (萬州, in modern Chongqing), and En (恩州, in modern Enshi Tujia and Miao Autonomous Prefecture, Hubei) as well. However, believing that the Qutang Gorge would serve as a good natural defense, Wang Jian decided to make no further attempt to capture Gui (歸州) and Xia (峽州) (both in modern Yichang, Hubei) as well. He made Wang Zongben the acting military governor of Wutai Circuit (武泰, headquartered in modern Chongqing) to govern over the region.

In 904, Zhu, wanting to put the emperor even firmer under control as a prelude to usurping the throne, forcibly moved Emperor Zhaozong from Chang'an to Luoyang. Emperor Zhaozong sent secret messengers to Wang Jian, asking him to come to the emperor's aid. Wang Jian sent Wang Zongyou north, claiming to be wanting to rendezvous with Fengxiang forces and jointly rescue the emperor, but when Wang Zongyou encountered Xuanwu forces, he abandoned the campaign. Thereafter, though, Wang Jian began to be issuing imperial edicts in the name of the emperor, claiming that he was temporarily taking imperial authority until the emperor would return to Chang'an (which Emperor Zhaozong would eventually never be able to do). Another subsequent secret edict issued by Emperor Zhaozong to Wang, Yang, and Li Keyong also drew no further response from Wang immediately. Later in the year, when Zhao Kuangning the military governor of Zhongyi Circuit (忠義, headquartered in modern Xiangfan, Hubei) attempted to capture the Jingnan prefectures that Wang had seized earlier, Wang Zongruan repelled Zhao's attack. Zhang Wu (張武) the prefect of Wan Prefecture further built an iron chain across the Yangtze, intending to secure it from further invasion from the east.

Meanwhile, believing that it would be advantageous to enter into an alliance with Li Maozhen for Li Maozhen to serve as a protective neighbor to the north, Wang Jian did so in early 905, and also jointly issued a declaration with Li Maozhen and Li Maozhen's adoptive son Li Jihui the military governor of Jingnan condemning Zhu. Thereafter, Wang gave his daughter in marriage to Li Maozhen's nephew LI Jichong (李繼崇) the military governor of Tianxiong Circuit (天雄, headquartered in modern Pingliang, Gansu), and often supplied Li Maozhen's army from this point on. At the suggestion of Feng Juan (馮涓), who believed that Wang's tax burdens were too high, Wang reduced the tax burdens on the people.

Soon thereafter, a marriage alliance was also concluded between Wang Jian and Zhao. Alarmed by the situation, Zhu Quanzhong attacked Zhao, defeating him and annexing his territory, forcing Zhao to flee to Huainan, while Zhao's brother Zhao Kuangming fled to Wang Jian. Around the same time, Wang sent another adoptive son, Wang Zonghe (王宗賀), to attack Feng Xingxi the military governor of Zhaoxin Circuit (昭信, headquartered in modern Ankang, Shaanxi). Feng fled, and his subordinate Quan Shilang (全師朗) surrendered Zhaoxin's capital Jin Prefecture (金州). Wang adopted Quan as a son (renaming him Wang Zonglang (王宗朗)) and made him the governor of Jin Prefecture and three other surrounding prefectures.

Meanwhile, Emperor Zhaozong had been assassinated by Zhu's soldiers and replaced by his son Emperor Ai. Zhu disavowed involvement, and subsequently sent messengers in Emperor Ai's name to various circuits to announce Emperor Zhaozong's death. When the messenger to Xichuan, Sima Qing (司馬卿), arrived at Xichuan, Wang, under the suggestion of Wei Zhuang, refused to meet with Sima; rather, he had his adoptive son Wang Zongwan (王宗綰), then the military governor of Wuding, meet with Sima, and Wang Zongwan publicly stated, on Wang Jian's behalf, openly breaking with Zhu:

The officers and soldiers of the Shu region had enjoyed the grace of Tang Dynasty for generations. Last year, when we heard that the emperor's train had gone east, we submitted 20 petitions and received no responses. Only until deserters from Bian Prefecture [(汴州, Xuanwu's capital)] arrived did we find out that the late emperor has been murdered by Zhu Quanzhong. The officers and soldiers of Shu have been preparing their arms day and night, seeking to avenge the emperor. I do not know what you will be announcing here, imperial messenger. You should consider what is best for yourself.

In late 906, Wang also officially established a mobile imperial government, with himself as its head. He ceremonially danced toward the east (in a sign of respect to the emperor) and stated that he was exercising authority on the emperor's behalf, under the precedents of Li Sheng and Zheng Tian.

In 907, Zhu Quanzhong (who had changed his name to Zhu Huang by that point) forced Emperor Ai to yield the throne to him, ending Tang and establishing a new Later Liang. Most of the circuit governors in the former Tang emperor, whether actually under Zhu's authority or not, recognized Zhu as the new emperor, with the exceptions of Wang, Li Keyong (the Prince of Jin), Li Maozhen (the Prince of Qi), and Yang Xingmi's son and successor Yang Wo (the Prince of Hongnong). Wang and Yang initially issued declarations claiming that they would rendezvous with Li Keyong and Li Maozhen to reestablish Tang, but the other circuits who recognized Zhu did not respond. Wang thereafter decided that he should claim imperial title as well and tried to encourage Li Keyong to do so as well; Li Keyong refused, but that did not sway Wang, and neither did contrary advice from Feng Juan. Wang thereafter declared himself emperor of a new state of Shu (known to historians as Former Shu to distinguish it from the later Later Shu).

== As Emperor of Shu ==
=== Early reign ===
It was said that while Wang Jian was illiterate, he favored talking with the intelligentsia, and was often retaining members of Tang aristocratic families so that they could pass on their knowledge. However, as his oldest son Wang Zongren (王宗仁) was disabled from his childhood, he created his second son Wang Zongyi initially the Prince of Sui while creating no other son imperial princes, hinting that Wang Zongyi was to be his heir. (He would not create his other sons imperial princes until late 910; a few, but not most, of his adoptive sons would be created imperial princes as well then.)

Wang Jian made Wang Zongji and Wei Zhuang his chancellors. However, Wang Zongji viewed himself as the oldest among the adoptive sons and a potential heir, and he was arrogant toward all other officials, including Wang Jian's close associate Tang Daoxi the director of palace communications. In 908, unhappy about this situation, Wang Jian gave Wang Zongji the honorific title of Taishi (太師) but stripped him of his chancellor status, replacing him with Zhang Ge. When Wang Zongji submitted a petition in which he challenged Wang Jian to name either him or Wang Zongyi crown prince, Wang Jian was offended; when Wang Zongji further offended him at a face-to-face meeting, Wang Jian had Wang Zongji put to death and then created Wang Zongyi crown prince.

In late 908, Qi, Former Shu, and Jin forces launched a joint attack on Chang'an, but after the Later Liang generals Liu Zhijun and Wang Zhongshi (王重師) defeated Qi forces, the Former Shu and Jin forces withdrew.

Also in 908, Wang Jian created his wife Lady Zhou empress. He would also create his concubines Consort Zhang (Wang Zongyi's mother) Guifei and two Consorts Xu (who were sisters) Xianfei and Defei respectively; he thereafter favored the Consorts Xu greatly.

In 910, Wang Zongyi and Tang began to have disputes with each other. Not wanting to see an open struggle between them, Wang Jian sent Tang out of the capital to serve as the military governor of Shannan West. Meanwhile, he continued his alliance with Qi, sending Qi such supplies as tea, silk, and textiles, but when Li Maozhen requested that he cede Ba (巴州, in modern Bazhong, Sichuan) and Jian (劍州, in modern Guangyuan) Prefectures, he refused. In 911, though, the Shu-Qi alliance would break up over marital relations — as Wang's daughter, who had married Li Jichong and whom Wang had created the Princess of Puci, wrote a letter to Wang complaining of Li Jichong's arrogance and drunkenness. Wang thus summoned her back to Chengdu, ostensibly just to visit the family. When she arrived at Chengdu, he kept her and refused to return her to Li Jichong. Li Maozhen, in anger, broke off the alliance with Shu.

Later in the year, Li Maozhen amassed troops on the Shu-Qi border. Wang Jian reacted by mobilizing a large force and commissioning Wang Zongkan as the overall commander, with Wang Zongyou, Wang Zonghe, and Tang as his deputies, to counteract the Qi move. Qi forces subsequently attacked Xingyuan but were repelled by Tang. Wang Jian himself headed for Li Prefecture, while leaving Wang Zongyi in command at Chengdu. After several victories by Shu forces over Qi forces, Wang Jian returned to Chengdu and left Wang Zonghui in charge at Li Prefecture. After he did, however, Li Jichong and Liu Zhijun (who had by this point surrendered to Qi and was serving as a Qi general) jointly attacked Xingyuan, nearly capturing it. Wang Jian sent Wang Zonghui and Wang Zongbo to relieve the siege, and they defeated Qi forces in conjunction with Tang. However, Qi forces continued to threaten Xingyuan and the nearby Anyuan Base (安遠), and it was not until Wang Jian himself went to Xingyuan late in the year to aid the Xingyuan and Anyuan forces that Shu forces were able to decisively defeat Qi forces, forcing them to withdraw. (Hearing of the war between Qi and Shu, Zhu Quanzhong wanted to take advantage of it, and sent messengers to Wang Jian, calling him "older brother." There was no record of what Wang Jian's reactions were.)

=== Late reign ===
In 913, Tang Daoxi returned from Shannan West and again served as director of palace communications. His old rivalry with Wang Zongyi (whose name had been changed to Wang Yuanying by this point) soon flared up, as Wang Yuanying accused him of crimes that made it inappropriate to again serve that point. Wang Jian, while displeased, gave Tang the honorary post of advisor to Wang Yuanying instead.

In fall 913, Wang Jian planned a vacation away from Chengdu for the Qixi Festival. Also for the occasion, the night before Wang Yuanying held a feast for the imperial princes and high-level officials, but three invitees — Wang Jian's adoptive son Wang Zonghan (王宗翰) the Prince of Ji, and the officials Pan Qiao (潘峭, who succeeded Tang as the director of palace communications) and Mao Wenxi (the chief imperial scholar) — did not attend. Wang Yuanying, in anger, accused Pan and Mao in absentia of alienating his brothers from him. Meanwhile, Wang Yuanying's trusted officers Xu Yao (徐瑤) and Chang Qian (常謙) were gazing at Tang. Tang, in fear, fled from the feast. The next day, both Wang Yuanying and Tang made accusations against each other, and the accusations soon flared up into military confrontations, as Wang Jian agreed to Tang's request to mobilize the regular troops to defend the palace (rather than the imperial guards, who were formally under Wang Yuanying's command). Upon hearing that the regular troops had been mobilized, Wang Yuanying mobilized his own Tianwu Army (天武軍) and attacked Tang. Tang initially resisted, but tried to retreat when an arrow hit him. The crown prince's troops then routed his, killing him, and many of the troops under Tang were killed. In response, at Pan Kang's suggestion, Wang Jian summoned his adoptive sons Wang Zongkan (王宗侃), Wang Zonghe (王宗賀), and Wang Zonglu (王宗魯), ordering them to launch an attack against Wang Yuanying's troops. They did so, along with another adoptive son, Wang Zong'an (王宗黯). They killed Xu in battle. Chang and Wang Yuanying fled to Longyao Pond (龍躍池) and hid on a boat there. The next morning, Wang Yuanying came out of hiding and requested food from the boat owner. This was reported to Wang Jian, and he dispatched Wang Zonghan to try to comfort Wang Yuanying. However, before Wang Zonghan arrived at Longyao Pond, Wang Yuanying was killed by his own guard. Wang Jian initially mourned Wang Yuanying bitterly, but later decided that without declaring Wang Yuanying a renegade, he could not comfort the people, and therefore demoted Wang Yuanying to commoner rank, although, apparently at Wang Jian's direction, Wang Zonghan had Wang Yuanying's killer executed. Many of Wang Yuanying's associates were killed or exiled.

Late in the year, Wang Jian considered whom to create as the new crown prince, as Pan repeatedly requested him to. He initially considered Wang Zonglu (王宗輅) the Prince of Ya, whom he considered most like himself, and Wang Zongjie (王宗傑) the Prince of Xin, whom he considered the most talented. However, Consort Xu the Xianfei wanted her son Wang Zongyan the Prince of Zheng, the youngest, created crown prince. She thus entered into an alliance with Tang Wenyi (唐文扆) the overseer of the imperial stables and Zhang Ge. Zhang falsely informed a number of high-level officials, including Wang Zongkan, that Wang Jian had settled on Wang Zongyan but wanted their public support. He then drafted a petition to have Wang Zongyan made crown prince, and had Wang Zongkan and the others sign the petition. When Wang Jian received the petition, believing that Wang Zongyan did have the high-level officials' support, he, despite his doubts about Wang Zongyan's abilities, created Wang Zongyan crown prince.

In 914, Gao Jichang the Later Liang military governor of Jingnan Circuit wanted to attack Former Shu to recapture the four prefectures that previously belonged to Jingnan. He first started by attacking Kui Prefecture. The prefect of Kui Prefecture, Wang Chengxian (王成先), despite the refusal by his superior Wang Zongshou (王宗壽) the Prince of Jia (Wang Jian's nephew) to provide supplies, was able to repel the Jingnan attack. When he subsequently tried to submit a secret report to Wang Jian accusing Wang Zongshou of holding back supplies, though, Wang Zongshou intercepted the report, arrested him, and executed him. Later in the year, Wang considered reacting by destroying a dam to flood Jingnan, but at Mao's urging, under the argument that there would be too many civilian casualties, he did not do so. Also late in 914, when Changhe (also known as Nanzhao) attacked Li Prefecture (黎州, in modern Ya'an, Sichuan), Wang Jian sent his adoptive sons Wang Zongfan (王宗範) and Wang Zongbo, as well as Wang Zongshou, to respond, and they defeated the Changhe forces, forcing their withdrawal. When Wang Zongfan, Wang Zongbo, and Wang Zongshou considered further advancing into Changhe territory, Wang Jian recalled them. It was said that thereafter, Changhe did not dare to again attack Shu territory.

In fall 915, Wang Jian launched a major attack against Qi, sending Wang Zongwan, assisted by Wang Zongbo, to attack Qin Prefecture (秦州, the capital of Tianxiong), and Wang Zongyao, assisted by Wang Zonghan, to attack Feng Prefecture (鳳州, in modern Baoji). Both attacks were successful, as Feng Prefecture fell, and Li Jichong surrendered Qin. With his wife and children among the captives at Qin, Liu Zhijun, who was commanding Qi forces in resisting the Shu attack, also surrendered, leaving Qi with little more territory than its capital Fengxiang.

In fall 916, Wang Jian prepared another major attack against Qi, sending Wang Zongwan, assisted by Wang Zonghan and Wang Zongshou to launch their attack from Feng, while sending Wang Zongbo, assisted by Liu, Wang Zongchou (王宗儔), and Tang Wenyi's brother Tang Wenyi (唐文裔, note different character), to launch their attack from Qin. They captured Baoji (寶雞, in modern Baoji) and put Fengxiang under siege. The siege, however, was hampered by snowstorms, and Wang Jian decided to lift the siege and recall the forces. He then declared a change of the state's name from Shu to Han.

In 917, a power struggle developed between Tang Wenyi, who was aligned with Zhang, and Mao. Based on Tang's accusations, Wang Jian exiled Mao and confiscated his assets, and also demoted the chancellor Yu Chuansu. Also, fearing Liu's abilities, he falsely accused Liu of treason and executed Liu.

In early spring 918, Wang Jian changed the name of the state from Han back to Shu.

That year, Wang Jian, who began to see that Wang Zongyan (whose name was changed to just Wang Yan by that point so that his brothers and adoptive brothers would not have a problem observing naming taboo) was not an appropriate crown prince due to Wang Yan's obsession with gaming and feasting, and thus became resentful of Zhang — but with Consort Xu supporting Zhang, he did not remove Zhang from his chancellor post. He did, however, consider replacing Wang Yan with Wang Zongjie. When Wang Zongjie died suddenly, he became very suspicious that the death was the result of foul play, but thereafter took no further action to replace Wang Yan.

Wang Jian became very ill in summer 918, and he summoned a group of high-level officials to entrust Wang Yan to them. Tang, however, wanted to eliminate the high-level officials so that he could take power by himself. The high-level officials realized this, and they forced their way into the palace to inform Wang Jian. Wang Jian thus exiled Tang, while issuing a final edict in which he put the eunuch Song Guangsi (宋光嗣), as well as Wang Zongbi, Wang Zongyao, Wang Zongwan, and Wang Zongkui (王宗夔) in charge of assisting Wang Yan in his reign. He also left instructions that the family of Consort Xu's family was not to be given military commands. He soon died, and Wang Yan took the throne as emperor.

== Personal information ==
Consort and issue(s):

- Empress Shunde, of the Zhou clan (順德皇后 周氏, 1 October 918)
- Able Consort, of the Xu clan (賢妃 徐氏, d. 926)
  - Wang Yan, Emperor (皇帝 王衍, 31 August 801 – 18 May 926), né Wang Zongyan (王宗衍), eleventh son
- Noble Consort, of the Zhang Clan (貴妃 張氏)
  - Wang Yuanying, Crown Prince (皇太子王元膺, 892 – 13 August 913), second son
- Pure Consort, of the Xu clan (淑妃 徐氏)
  - Wang Zongding, Prince of Lu (魯王 王宗鼎, d. 2 May 926), seventh son
- Furen, of the Xiao clan (夫人 蕭氏)
- Lady, of the Ma clan (馬氏)
  - Wang Zongren, Prince of Wei (衛王 王宗仁), first son
- Lady, of the Song clan (宋氏)
  - Wang Zonglu, Prince of Bin (邠王 王宗輅, d. 2 May 926), third son
- Lady, of the Chen clan (陳氏)
  - Wang Zongzhi, Prince of Han (韓王 王宗智, d. 2 May 926), fifth son
  - Wang Zongte, Prince of Ju (莒王 王宗特, d. 2 May 926), tenth son
- Lady, of the Qiao clan (喬氏)
  - Wang Zongjie, Prince of Xin (信王 王宗傑, d. 918), eight son
- Lady, of the Chu clan (褚氏)
  - Wang Zongze, Prince of Song (宋王 王宗澤, d. 2 May 926), sixth son
  - Wang Zongping, Prince of Xue (薛王 王宗平, d. 2 May 926), ninth son
- Unknown
  - Wang Zongji, Prince of Zhao (趙王 王宗紀, d. 2 May 926), fourth son
  - Princess Puci (普慈公主), first daughter
    - married Li Jichong (李繼崇), nephew of Li Maozhen (李茂貞), and had issue ( a daughter)
  - Princess Ankang (安康公主), second son
  - Princess Emei (峨眉公主), third daughter
    - Married Liu Siyan (劉嗣湮), a son of Li Zhijun (劉知俊)
- Adoptive Children
  - Wang Zongji (王宗佶), né Gan (甘), the Duke of Jin (executed 908)
  - Wang Zongkan (王宗侃), né Tian Shikan (田師侃), initially the Prince of Le'an, later the Prince of Wei
  - Wang Zongdi (王宗滌), né Hua Hong (華洪) (executed 902)
  - Wang Zonghan (王宗翰), né Meng (孟), the Prince of Ji (created 910)
  - Wang Zongbi (王宗弼), né Wei Hongfu (魏弘夫), initially the Prince of Julu, later the Prince of Qi (executed by Guo Chongtao 925)
  - Wang Zong'an (王宗黯), né Ji Jian (吉諫), the Prince of Langye
  - Wang Zongbian (王宗弁), né Lu Bian (鹿弁)
  - Wang Zongben (王宗本), né Xie Congben (謝從本)
  - Wang Zongruan (王宗阮), né Wen Wujian (文武堅)
  - Wang Zongbo (王宗播), né Xu Cun (許存)
  - Wang Zongchou (王宗儔) (died 924)
  - Wang Zongjin (王宗謹), né Wang Zhao (王釗)
  - Wang Zongwan (王宗綰), né Li Wan (李綰), the Prince of Lintao
  - Wang Zongru (王宗儒), né Yang Ru (楊儒)
  - Wang Zonghao (王宗浩) (drowned 911)
  - Wang Zonglang (王宗朗), né Quan Shilang (全師朗)
  - Wang Zongwo (王宗渥), né Zheng Wo (鄭渥) (executed by Li Jiji 925)
  - Wang Zongfan (王宗範), né Zhang (張), the Prince of Kui, son of Consort Zhang by a prior husband
  - Wang Zongyao (王宗瑤), né Jiang Zhi (姜郅), the Prince of Linzi
  - Wang Zongxun (王宗訓), né Wang Maoquan (王茂權) (executed 914)
  - Wang Zongmian (王宗勉), né Zhao Zhang (趙章)
  - Wang Zongkui (王宗夔), the Prince of Langye
  - Wang Zongyi (王宗裔. note different character than his adoptive brother), the Prince of Langye
  - Wang Zongju (王宗矩), né Hou Ju (侯矩)
  - Wang Zongyou (王宗祐)
  - Wang Zongfen (王宗汾)
  - Wang Zongxin (王宗信)
  - Wang Zonghe (王宗賀)
  - Wang Zongshao (王宗紹)
  - Wang Zonghong (王宗宏)
  - Wang Zongduo (王宗鐸)
  - Wang Zonglu (王宗魯)
  - Wang Zongyu (王宗昱)
  - Wang Zongxun (王宗勳) (executed by Li Jiji 925)
  - Wang Zongyàn (王宗晏, note different tone than his adoptive brothers)
  - Wang Zongrui (王宗汭) (executed by Li Jiji 925)
  - Wang Zongwěi (王宗偉, note different tone than his adoptive brother)
  - Wang Zongxian (王宗憲), né Xu (許)
  - Wang Zongyǎn (王宗儼, note different tone than one adoptive brother and different character than another) (executed by Li Jiji 925)
  - Wang Zongwēi (王宗威, note different tone than his adoptive brother)
  - Wang Chengjian (王承檢)

Regnal titles
Preceded by None (dynasty founded)	Emperor of Former Shu; 907–918	Succeeded by Wang Zongyan
Preceded by Emperor Ai of Tang	Emperor of China (Southwest); 907–918	Succeeded by Wang Zongyan
