= Spring and Autumn Annals of the Ten Kingdoms =

Chinese history text by Wu Renchen

- Author: Wu Renchen
- Original title: 十國春秋
- Language: Classical Chinese
- Subject: History of the Ten Kingdoms
- Publication date: 17th century
- Publication place: Qing dynasty China

The Spring and Autumn Annals of the Ten Kingdoms, also known by its Chinese title Shiguo Chunqiu (Chinese: 十國春秋), is a history of the Ten Kingdoms that existed in southern China after the fall of the Tang dynasty and before the reunification of China proper by the Song dynasty. The book was written and compiled by the Qing dynasty scholar Wu Renchen (c. 1628 – c. 1689). Wu took part in the compilation of Mingshi, the official history of the Ming dynasty, and felt that the official dynastic histories have neglected the Ten Kingdoms. The book contains 114 volumes (scrolls).

== Contents ==
The book consists of 114 volumes covering the histories of the Ten Kingdoms:

1. 14 volumes – Wu (907–937)
2. 20 volumes – Southern Tang (937–975)
3. 13 volumes – Former Shu (907–925)
4. 10 volumes – Later Shu (934–965)
5. 9 volumes – Southern Han (917–971)
6. 10 volumes – Chu (907–951)
7. 13 volumes – Wuyue (907–978)
8. 10 volumes – Min (909–945)
9. 4 volumes – Jingnan (924–963)
10. 5 volumes – Northern Han (951–979)
