= Former Shu =

10th-century Chinese kingdom

Great Shu / Han 大蜀 / 漢
- 907–925
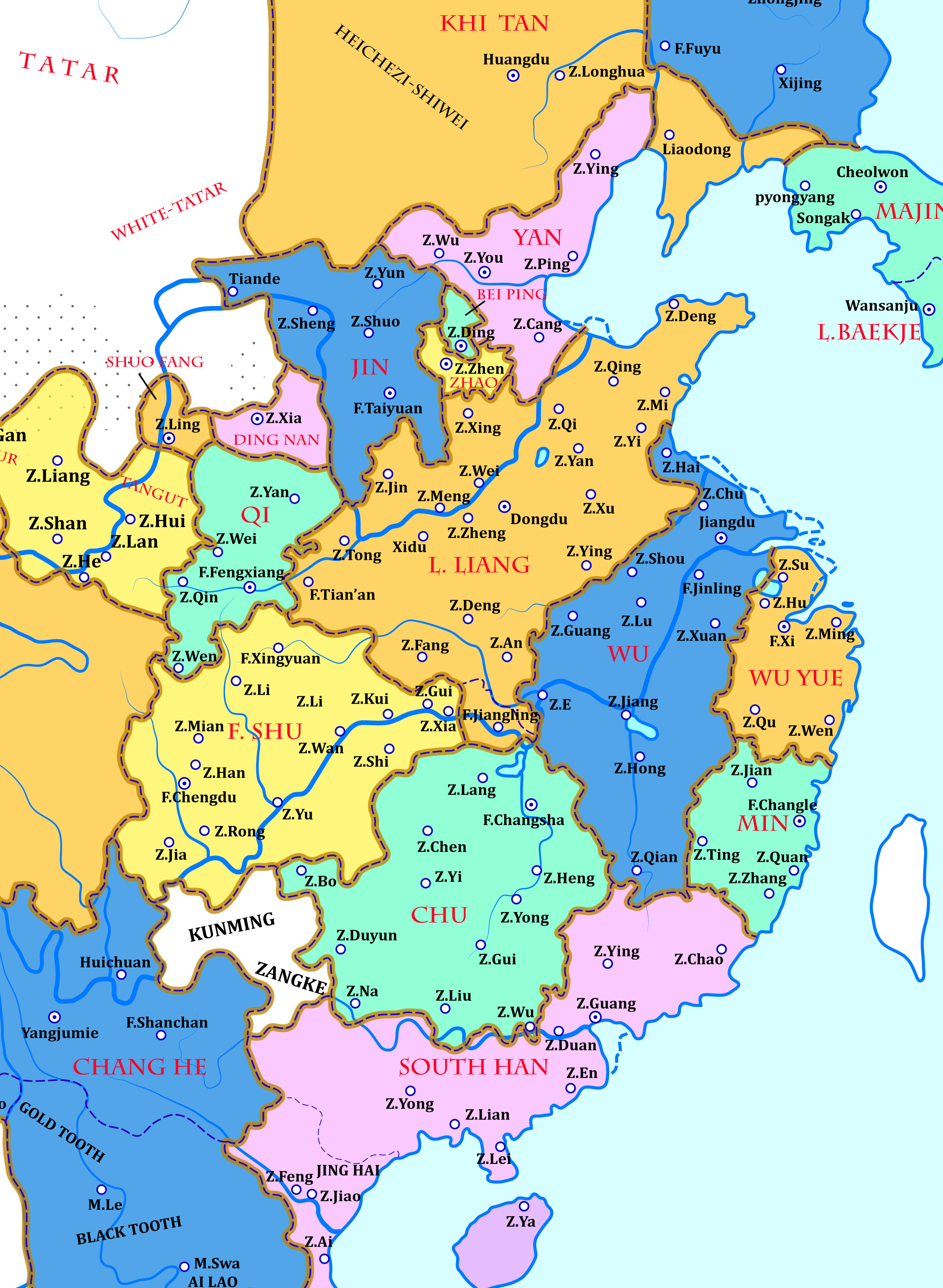
- Capital: Chengdu
- Common languages: Ba–Shu Chinese
- Government: Monarchy
- Emperor
  - 907–918: Wang Jian
  - 918–925: Wang Zongyan
- Historical era: Five Dynasties and Ten Kingdoms Period
  - Foundation of the State of Shu under Tang rule: 903
  - Fall of the Tang dynasty: June 1, 907 907
  - Ended by the Later Tang: 925 925
- Currency: Chinese coin, Chinese cash
Preceded by	Succeeded by
Tang dynasty	Later Tang
- Today part of: China
- Shu had changed its country name from "Shu" to "Han" in 917–918.

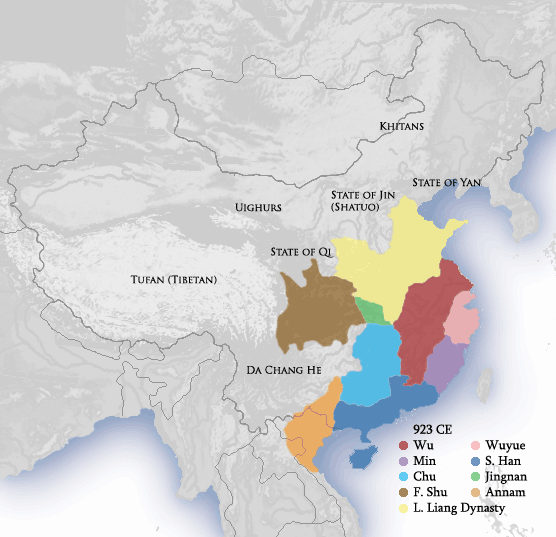
China in 923; Former Shu marked brown

Great Shu (Chinese: 大蜀; pinyin: Dàshǔ), known in historiography as the Former Shu (Chinese: 前蜀; pinyin: Qiánshǔ) or occasionally Wang Shu (王蜀), was a dynastic state of China and one of the Ten Kingdoms during the Five Dynasties and Ten Kingdoms period. It existed from 907 to 925 CE.

The country's name changed from "Shu" to "Han" (Chinese: 漢; pinyin: Hàn) in 917–918, which is not to be confused with another contemporaneous kingdom during the same Five Dynasties and Ten Kingdoms period, the Southern Han (traditional Chinese: 南漢; simplified Chinese: 南汉; pinyin: Nán Hàn), 917–971 CE.

== Rulers ==
Sovereigns in the Former Shu Kingdom 907–925
Temple Names	Posthumous Names	Personal Names	Period of Reigns	Era Names and range
高祖 (Gaozu)	Too tedious thus not used when referring to this sovereign	王建 (Wangjian)	907–918	Tianfu (天復) 907; Wucheng (武成) 908–910; Yongping (永平) 911–915; Tongzheng (通正) 916; Tianhan (天漢) 917; Guangtian (光天) 918
Did not exist	Did not exist	王衍 (Wangyan)	918–925	Qiande (乾德) 918–925; Xiankang (咸康) 925

Family tree
Wang Jian 王建 847–918; Gaozu 高祖; 907–918
Wang Yan 王衍 899–925; Houzhu 后主; 918–925

== See also ==
- Later Shu
