= China–Iran relations =

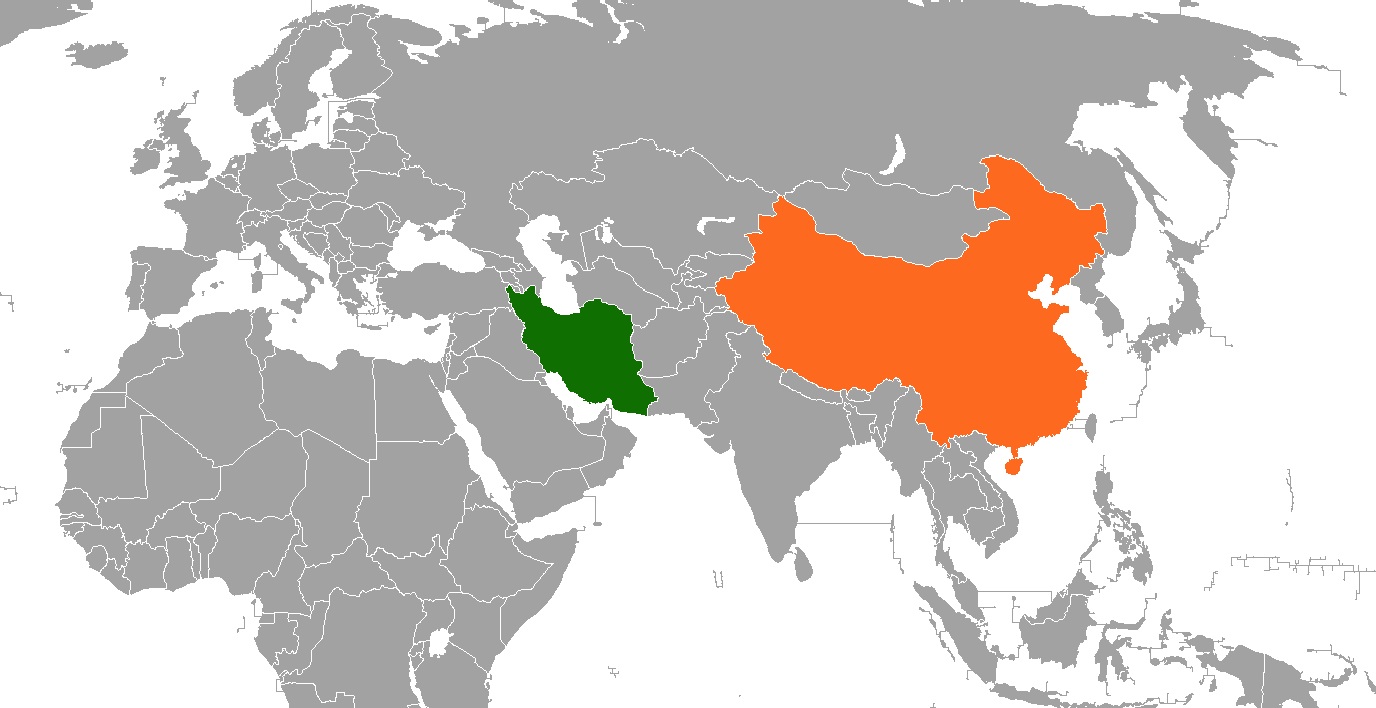

- Iran: China

Diplomatic mission
- Embassy of Iran, Beijing: Embassy of China, Tehran

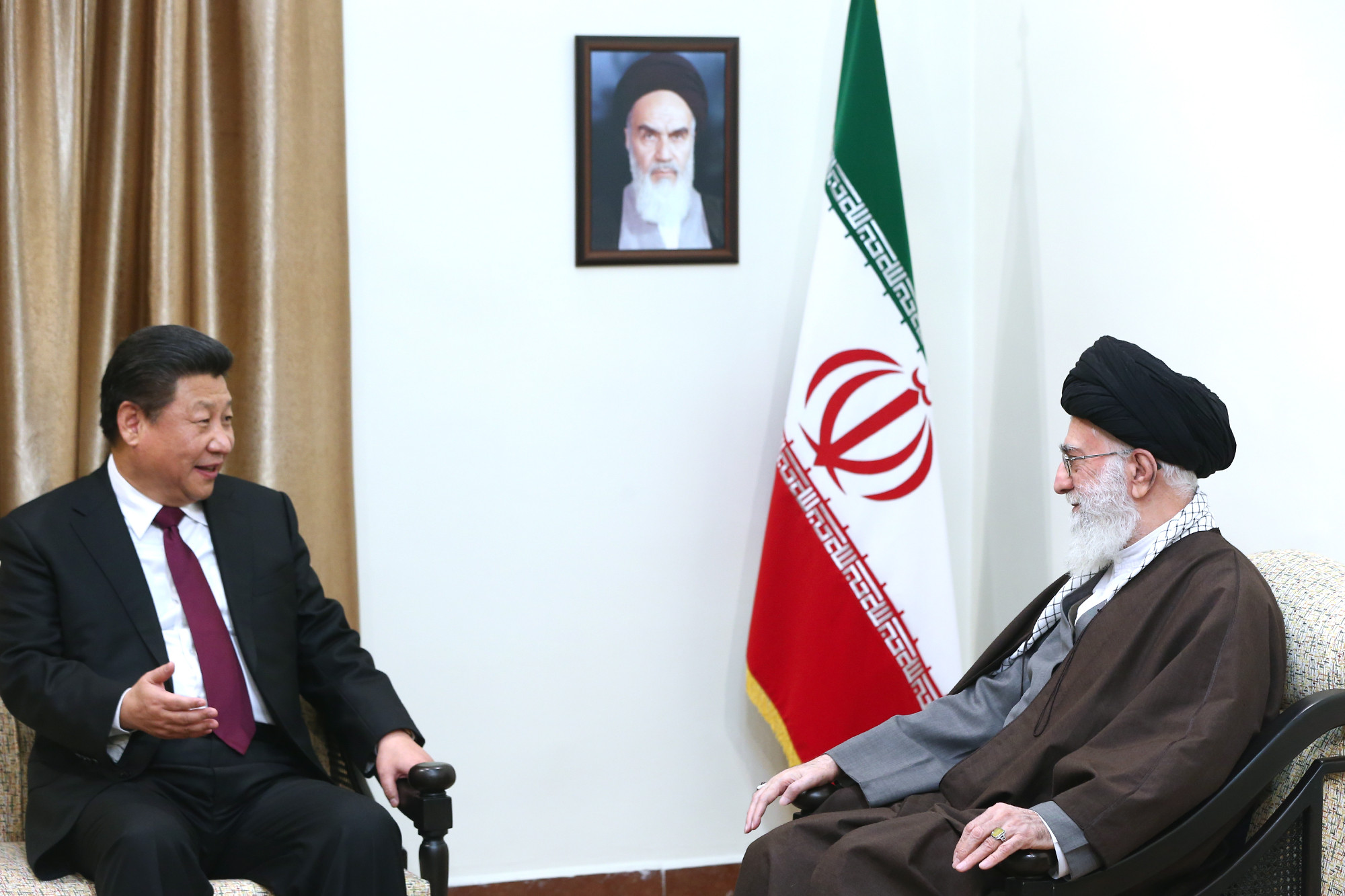
CCP General Secretary Xi Jinping and Iranian Supreme Leader Ali Khamenei.

China–Iran relations (Chinese: 中国–伊朗关系, Persian: روابط ایران و چین) refer to the bilateral relations between the People's Republic of China and the Islamic Republic of Iran. The relationship between the two civilizations is one of the oldest continuous contacts in history, stretching back more than 2,500 years. Their earliest interactions began when the Achaemenid Empire and the Zhou dynasty had indirect contact in the 6th century BC. The first direct and official contact started between the Parthian Empire and Han dynasty around 200 BC, when the Chinese envoy Zhang Qian encountered the Parthian court. In 115 BC, Emperor Wu of Han, seeking to expand trade—especially in his search for high-quality horse herds—sent envoys with gifts to the court of Mithridates II.

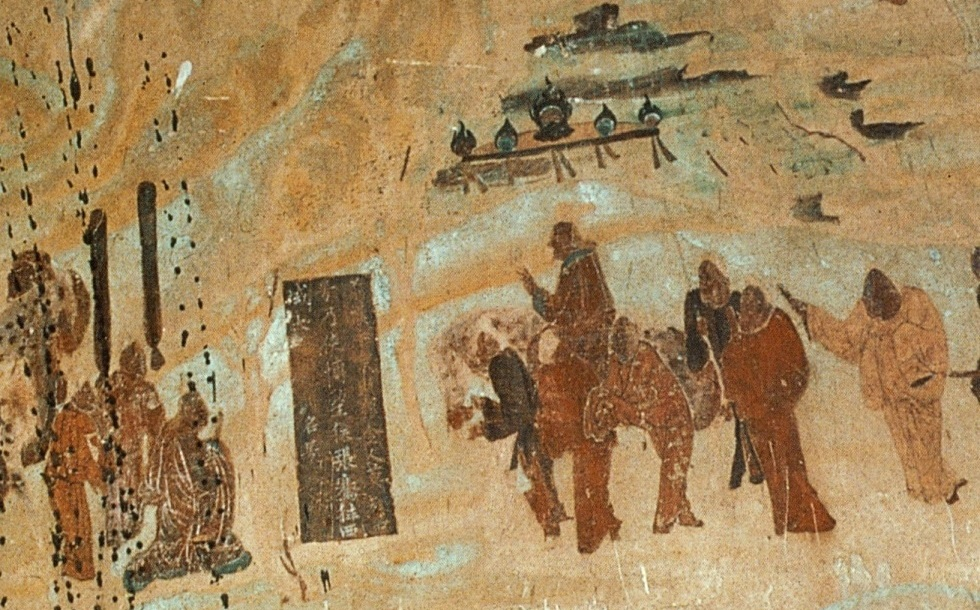
The 138–126 BC travels of Zhang Qian to the West, Mogao Caves, 618–712 AD mural.

Persian merchants became the main carriers of goods and culture across Central Asia, bringing their religions, music, and ideas into China. Ambassadors were exchanged, and Chinese travelers visited Iran regularly. Each side introduced new goods to the other, the most famous of which was Chinese silk. The trade route carrying this precious commodity from China to Europe passed through Iran, becoming known as the Silk Road, with Iran controlling much of the trade that moved silk, metals, glass, and textiles between East and West.

During the Sassanid Empire, royal marriages took place. Trade also expanded by sea, with Persian sailors linking the Persian Gulf to Chinese ports. In the 13th century during the Mongol era, Iran (under Ilkhanate) and China (under Yuan) were part of a single empire.

In modern times, official diplomatic relations were established in 1937 between the Republic of China and Pahlavi Iran. During the Cold War before the mid-1960s, Iran was generally aligned against the People's Republic of China until both countries' relations with the Soviet Union and the United States shifted. After the Iranian Revolution, China and the U.S. were both distrusted, but subsequent international sanctions pushed Iran closer to China. Cooperation gradually expanded, with China purchasing more than 80 percent of Iran's shipped oil by 2025 and becoming a leading investor in transportation and industrial projects. Relations deepened through long-term economic agreements and China's Belt and Road Initiative, making Iran one of China's most important strategic partners. In 2021, the two nations signed a 25-year cooperation agreement.

== History ==
=== Achaemenid-Zhou era ===
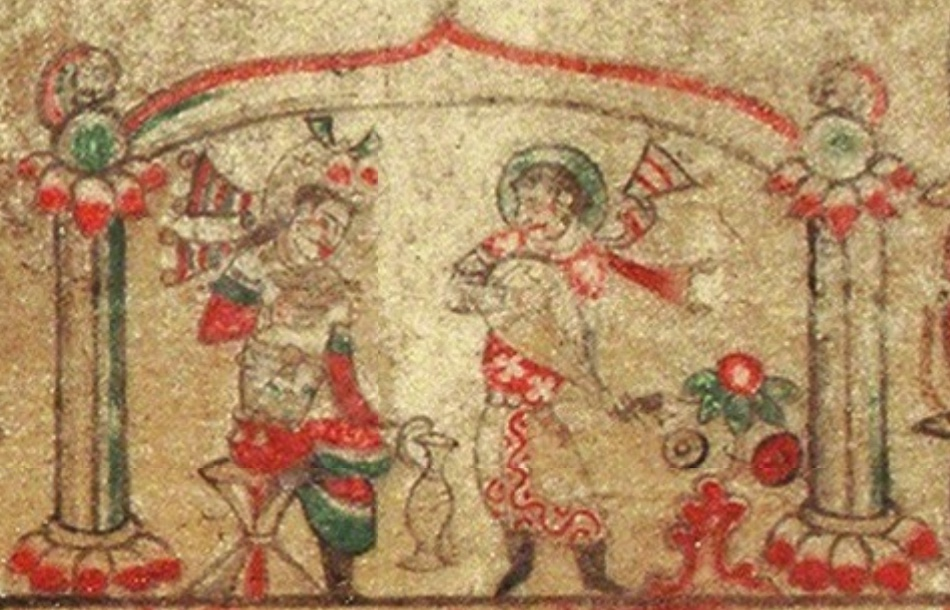
Detail of the stone panel painting on the sarcophagus, depicting two nimbate male figures dressing in Sasanian-style attire, drinking wine and playing pipa. Tomb of Yu Hong, 6th century CE.

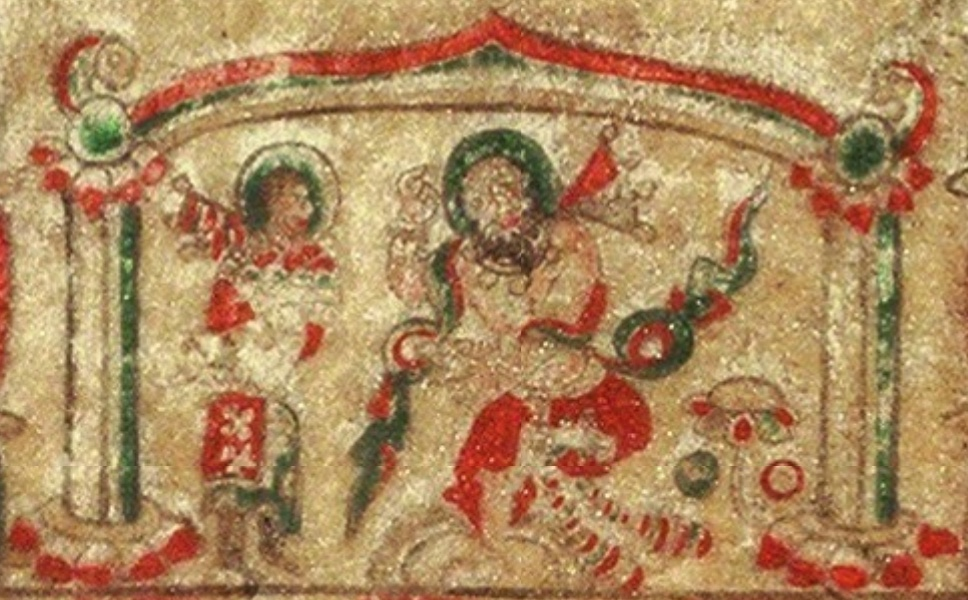
Left: a man holding a plate of fruits; right: a bearded man is performing the Huteng ("Barbarian leap") dance. Both figures have haloes. Tomb of Yu Hong, 6th century CE.

There were indirect contact between the two sides in 550-330 BC. The Achaemenid Empire, stretching from the Mediterranean to Central Asia between the 6th and 4th centuries BC, pushed the Persian frontier close to regions that later connected directly with China. Although no formal diplomatic exchange is recorded between the two sides during this period, trade routes that would later form the Silk Road already existed in primitive form. Goods, ideas, and technologies moved step-by-step through Central Asian intermediaries, linking the two civilizations long before they physically met. Chinese texts reference Iran/Persia as Bosi. In essence, the relationship was not one of direct diplomacy but of early trans-Eurasian connectivity, laying the foundation for the deeper relations that would flourish later.

=== Han-Parthian era ===
The Han dynasty diplomat and explorer Zhang Qian, who visited neighboring Bactria and Sogdiana in 126 BCE, made the first known Chinese report on Parthia. In his accounts, Parthia is named "Ānxí" (Chinese: 安息), a transliteration of "Arsacid", the name of the Parthian dynasty. Zhang Qian clearly identifies Parthia as an advanced urban civilization, whose development he equates to those of Dayuan (in Ferghana) and Daxia (in Bactria).

"Anxi is situated several thousand li west of the region of the Great Yuezhi (in Transoxonia). The people are settled on the land, cultivating the fields and growing rice and wheat. They also make wine out of grapes. They have walled cities like the people of Dayuan (Ferghana), the region contains several hundred cities of various sizes. The coins of the country are made of silver and bear the face of the King. When the King dies, the currency is immediately changed and new coins issued with the face of his successor. The people keep records by writing on horizontal strips of leather. To the west lies Tiaozi (Mesopotamia) and to the north Yancai (Alans) and Lixuan (Hyrcania)." (Shiji, 123, Zhang Qian quote, trans. Burton Watson).

Following Zhang Qian's embassy and report, the Han conquered Dayuan in the Han-Dayuan war and established the Protectorate of the Western Regions, thereby opening the Silk Road and clashing with Persia sphere of influence (as some satraps were part of the conflict). Commercial relations between China, Central Asia, and Parthia flourished, as many Chinese missions were sent throughout the 1st century BCE:

"The largest of these embassies to foreign states numbered several hundred persons, while even the smaller parties included over 100 members… In the course of one year, anywhere from five to six to over ten parties would be sent out." (Shiji, trans. Burton Watson).

The Parthians were, apparently, very intent on maintaining good relations with China and also sent their own embassies, starting around 110 BC: "When the Han envoy first visited the Kingdom of Anxi (Parthia), the King of Anxi dispatched a party of 20,000 horsemen to meet them on the eastern border of the Kingdom. When the Han envoys set out again to return to China, the King of Anxi dispatched envoys of his own to accompany them. The Emperor was delighted at this." (Shiji, 123, trans. Burton Watson).

Parthians also played a role in the Silk Road transmission of Buddhism from Central Asia to China. An Shih Kao, a Parthian nobleman and Buddhist missionary, went to the Chinese capital Luoyang in 148 CE, where he established temples and became the first man to translate Buddhist scriptures into Chinese. The Persianized kingdom of Kushan became the crossroads for Sino-Indian Buddhist transmissions, with many Iranians translating Sanskrit sutras into Chinese.

=== Sassanid era ===
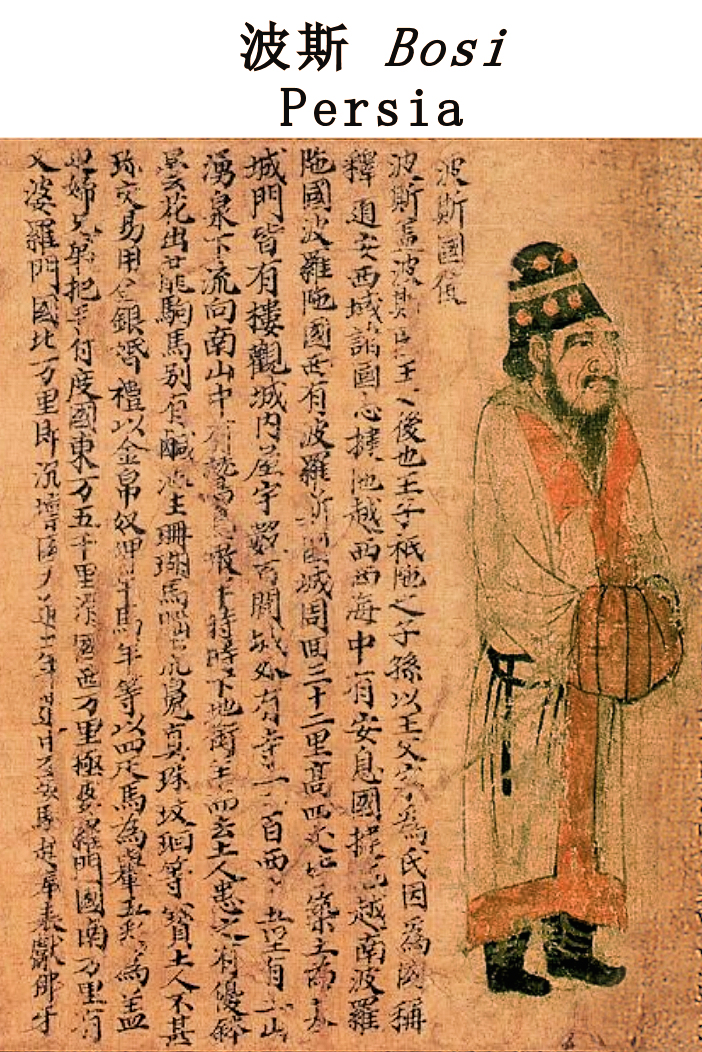
Persian ambassador at the Chinese court of Emperor Yuan of Liang in his capital Jingzhou in 526-539 CE, with explanatory text. Portraits of Periodical Offering of Liang, 11th century Song copy.

Like their predecessors the Parthians, the Sassanian Empire maintained active foreign relations with China. Ambassadors from Iran frequently traveled to China, with Chinese documents recording the reception of thirteen Sassanian embassies. Commercially, land and sea trade with China was important to both the Sassanian and Chinese Empires. Large numbers of Sassanian coins have been found in southern China, confirming the existence of bilateral maritime trade.

On various occasions, Sassanian kings sent their most talented Persian musicians and dancers to the Chinese imperial court. Both empires benefited from trade along the Silk Road, and shared a common interest in preserving and protecting that trade. They cooperated in guarding the trade routes through central Asia, and both built outposts in border areas to keep caravans safe from nomadic tribes and bandits.

In 547, during the Liang dynasty in China, a Persian embassy paid tribute to the Liang. Amber was recorded as originating from Iran by the Liang Shu (Book of Liang).

There are records of several joint Sassanian and Chinese efforts against their common Hephtalite enemy. Following encroachments by the nomadic Turkic tribes on states in Central Asia, an apparent collaboration between Chinese and Sassanian forces repelled the Turkic advances. Documents from Mount Mogh also note the presence of a Chinese general in the service of the king of Sogdiana at the time of the Arab incursion.

The last members of the Sassanian Empire's royal family fled to Tang China. Following the conquest of Iran by Muslim Arabs, Peroz III, the son of Yazdegerd III, escaped, along with a few Persian nobles, and took refuge in the Chinese imperial court. Both Peroz and his son Narsieh (Chinese neh-shie) were given high titles at the Tang court. In 661, Peroz III was appointed Governor of Persia. At least on two occasions, the last possibly in 670, Chinese troops were sent with Peroz to help him against the Arabs to restore him to the Sassanian throne, with mixed results. Narsieh later attained the position of commander of the Chinese imperial guards and his descendants lived in China as respected princes.

=== Caliphate era and Islamic golden age ===
The Caliph Uthman ibn Affan (r. 644–656) sent an embassy to the Tang court in Chang'an.

During the Muslim conquest of Transoxiana, The Umayyad commander, Qutayba ibn Muslim conquered the Bukharan territories of Numushkat and Ramithna in 707 CE (88 AH). But shortly after, he faced a coalition force of roughly 200,000 soldiers from Ferghana and Sogdiana, led by Kur Maghayun, who was the Chinese emperor's nephew. A heavy battle occurred. Qutayba managed to defeat the coalition army in combat, driving its commander to retreat, and then led his army back to his base at Merv.

The Umayyad Caliphate in 715 AD deposed Ikhshid, the king the Fergana Valley, and installed a new king Alutar on the throne. The deposed king fled to Kucha (seat of Anxi Protectorate), and sought Chinese intervention. The Chinese sent 10,000 troops under Zhang Xiaosong to Fergana. He defeated Alutar and the Arab occupation force at Namangan and reinstalled Ikhshid on the throne.

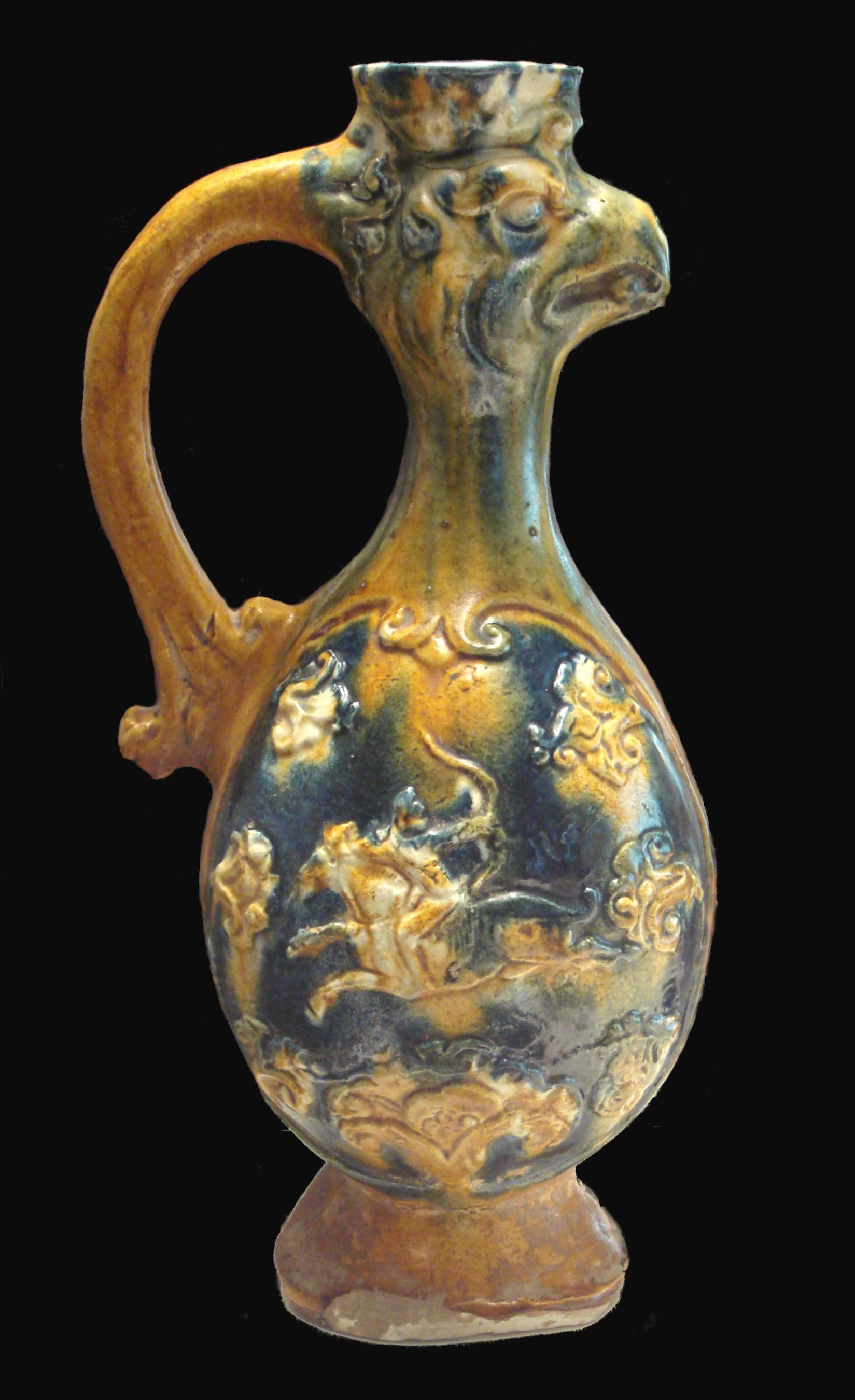
Tang sancai vase displaying Central Asian and Persian influence. 8-9th century. Guimet Museum.

After the Islamic conquest, Iran continued to flourish during the Islamic Golden Age, and its relations with China continued. In 751, the Abbasid Caliphate, which ruled Iran, was in dispute with the Tang dynasty of China over the control of the Syr Darya region during the Battle of Talas. The commander of the Abbasid army was Zayid ibn Salih, a Persian, and the commanders of the Tang army were Gao Xianzhi, a Goguryo Korean, alongside Li Siye and Duan Xiushi, both Chinese. After the Abbasids won the battle, relations improved, and there were no more conflicts between China and the Caliphate.

The Abbasid Caliphate continued to send embassies to China and 13 diplomatic gifts were recorded between 752 and 798.

During the An Lushan rebellion, Tian Shengong massacred foreign Arab and Persian Muslim merchants in the Yangzhou massacre (760). Tian, who was defecting to the Tang dynasty, sought recognition from the Tang court and presented the conflict as one between the rebel Hu of Yan and the Han Chinese Tang state. He killed foreigners as a demonstration of loyalty to the Tang and to secure recognition as a regional warlord without surrendering territory. The victims also included members of other foreign Hu barbarian ethnicities, as well whose ethnic groups were not specified. The violence was directed against foreigners more broadly, rather than only Arabs and Persians.[ The Tang dynasty recovered its power decades after the An Lushan rebellion and was still able to launch offensive conquests and campaigns like its destruction of the Uyghur Khaganate in Mongolia in 840–847. The Abbasids continued diplomatic relations with China in the tenth century.

Zoroastrianism, Manichaeism, and polo were exported to the Tang.

=== Mongol Yuan ===
A large number of Central Asian and Persian soldiers, experts, and artisans were recruited by the Mongol empire Yuan dynasty of China. Some of them, known as semu ("assorted officials"), occupied important official posts in the Yuan state administration. One of the most famous settlers from Bukhara was Sayyid Ajjal Shams al-Din Omar, who is identified as an ancestor of many Chinese Hui lineages and that of Yunnan's Panthay Hui population. His most famous descendant was Zheng He, who became the Ming dynasty's most famous explorer.

Han Chinese general Guo Baoyu campaigned with Genghis in Central Asia against the Khwarezmian Empire, and his grandson Guo Kan campaigned under Hulagu at the Nizari fortresess of Maymundiz and Alamut, as well as at Baghdad in 1258 in Iraq. They were direct descendants of Guo Ziyi.

Expansion of the Mongol Empire from 1206 to 1294

In the 1220s, the Mongols sent Khitan and Han Chinese administrators to Bukhara and Samarqand to govern, and this was witnessed by Qiu Chuji on his way to meet Genghis Khan in Afghanistan. Chinese siege engineers were deployed in Iran and Iraq by the Ilkhanate. The Khitan Yelü Chucai was sent by the Mongols to Central Asia.

The war between Qaidu and Kublai wrecked the economy of Qocho and stopped trade between China and West Asia and Europe. During the war between Kublai Khan and Kaidu, the Uyghurs of Qocho (Gaochang) fled Qaidu's assaults into Gansu, under Yuan control from Turfan, in 1283, placing Yongchang as their capital and between 1270 and 1275, making Gansu's city of Qamil their capital. Uyghur subjects fled along with the royal court. The Mongols sent new people to repopulate the Jaxartes river (lower Syr Darya) and the city of Yangikent (Iamkint or Sakint) after deporting and killing the natives. The upper Yenisei region of Qianqianzhou received many Han Chinese artisans and the western Mongolia-based military base and granary city of Chinqai received many Han Chinese artisans put there by Mongols, as heard in 1221–1222 by Li Zhichang, who was going to Central Asia. Kublai Khan sent southern Han Chinese farmers from the Southern Song repeatedly to the Siberian Kyrgyz region of Yenisei in 1272, and before that year as well. He also sent them farming equipment and oxen. Tanguts, Khitans, and Han Chinese were sent to take care of gardens and fields in the depopulated and sacked city of Samarkand, where only 25% of the original 100,000 households survived the Mongol sacking, and Han Chinese artisans were "everywhere" in the ruined city, as witnessed on 3 December 1221. They managed to rehabilitate and reconstruct the city, since Samarqand was praised as a productive flourishing area before at least 1225, when the Khitan Yelu Chucai came there. Mongke sent Chang De to Hulagu in 1259. He went across Central Asia. He said, "numerous Chinese growing wheat, barley, millet, and [other] grains" lived around Lake Qizilbash and the Ulungur river in north Dzungaria and the cities of Almaliq and Tiermuer Chancha had many Han Chinese from Shaanxi in the Ili river valley. He said, "the Muslim populace [there] has become mixed with the Chinese and over time, their customs have gradually come to resemble those of the Middle Kingdom." During Mongke's rule in the 1250s in Iran in the 13th century, Iran received thousands of Han Chinese farmers. Han Chinese were the plurality in the Iranian Azerbaijan city of Khoy as of 1340, as testified by Mustawfi. Han Chinese in Khoy and Tabriz in Iranian Azerbaijan were originally sent to Marv by the Mongols before being sent to the Iranian Azerbaijani cities, as recorded by Rashid al-Din.

Rashid al-din said that the Chinese millet grain known as tuki was brought by Han Chinese first to Marv in Turkmenistan and then to Iranian Azerbaijan in Khoy and Tabriz. Later, Han Chinese were reported to be the most significant ethnicity generations later, in Khoi around 1340, when Mustawfi wrote about them. Rashid al-din wrote it in 1310. And local Muslims in Almalik lived with Han Chinese and Han Chinese were employed as guards and millet, barley, and wheat farmers around Beshbalik and worked in Samarkand as seen in 1259 by Liu Yu. Wheat and hemp were grown next to mud huts near the Kerulun river by Han Chinese farmers in 1247 near Karakorum, as seen by Zhang Dehui. Han Chinese made up 70% of herders in Mongolia, as seen by Xuting and Peng Daya. Siberia's Upper Yeniesei area, Samarkand, and western Mongolia all had Han Chinese craftsmen, as seen by Li Zhichang in 1221–1222. He visited Balkh, Samarkand, and Tashkent when he went to Central Asia and Mongolia from Shandong.

The Tabriz-based Rob'-e Rashidi and the Maraghe observatory in Ilkhanid Iran had scientists and scholars of Chinese origin. The "Book of Precious Presents or the Medicine of the Chinese People" (Tansuq-name ya tebb-e ahl-e Kheta) was translated by people working under Rashid-al-Din Fazl-Allah to Persian from Chinese and it was about Chinese medicine.

Rashid al-Din wrote about Chinese culture and history. Oljeitu's birth was witnessed by Rashid al-Din. The Sunni convert Jew Rashid al-Din was executed after the Ilkhanate became Shia.

Han Chinese were sent to the Upper Yenisei valley as weavers, into Samarkand and Outer Mongolia as craftsmen, as noticed by Ch'ang-ch'un in 1221-22 when he travelled to Kabul from Beijing and they moved to Russia and Iran. The Euphrates and Tigris basins were irrigated by Chinese hydraulic engineers and in 1258, at the siege of Baghdad, one of Hulagu Khan's generals was Han Chinese. Because of the Mongols, Chinese influenced architecture, music, ceramics, and Persian miniatures in the Golden Horde and Il-khan. Han Chinese, Mongols, Uighurs, Venetians, and Geonese all lived in Tabriz, where paper money was introduced and movable type printing and wood engraving as well as paper money, printed fabrics, and playing cards spread from China to Europe due to the Mongols. Wood engraving which was Chinese was mentioned in the 1313 book "Treasure of the Il-khan on the Sciences of Cathay", which was about Chinese medicine and translated by Rashid al-Din. The Mongols brought the Chinese idea of paper currency to Iran in 1294 where the name of the currency, chaw, was taken from the Chinese word Chao.

During the Mongol-Yuan period, some historians claim Persian was the lingua franca of Central Asia, and many Persians and Central Asians migrated to China. There was a large Persian community in China, especially among Chinese Muslims, and claim that Persian was one of the official languages of the Yuan dynasty, alongside Chinese and Mongolian. However, other historians challenge that claim and say Turkic languages, primarily Old Uyghur, were the auxiliary secondary language of the Yuan dynasty after the Mongol language and Chinese language and that Turkic languages were also the lingua franca of Mongol-ruled Central Asia, saying that Persian was not an official language of the Yuan.

The Chinese Yuan and Persian Ilkhanate enjoyed close relations, with nearly annual diplomatic exchanges between the two.

In 1289, Kublai Khan established a Muslim university in Beijing. Persian works were translated en masse into Chinese, some of which are preserved today by the Peking University Library. Many tombstones and archaeological tablets found in China are also probably written in the Perso-Arabic script.

China exported astronomical tools and discoveries, printing, paper money, sancai, and porcelain to Iran. Porcelain particularly grew popular among Persians.

=== Ming dynasty ===
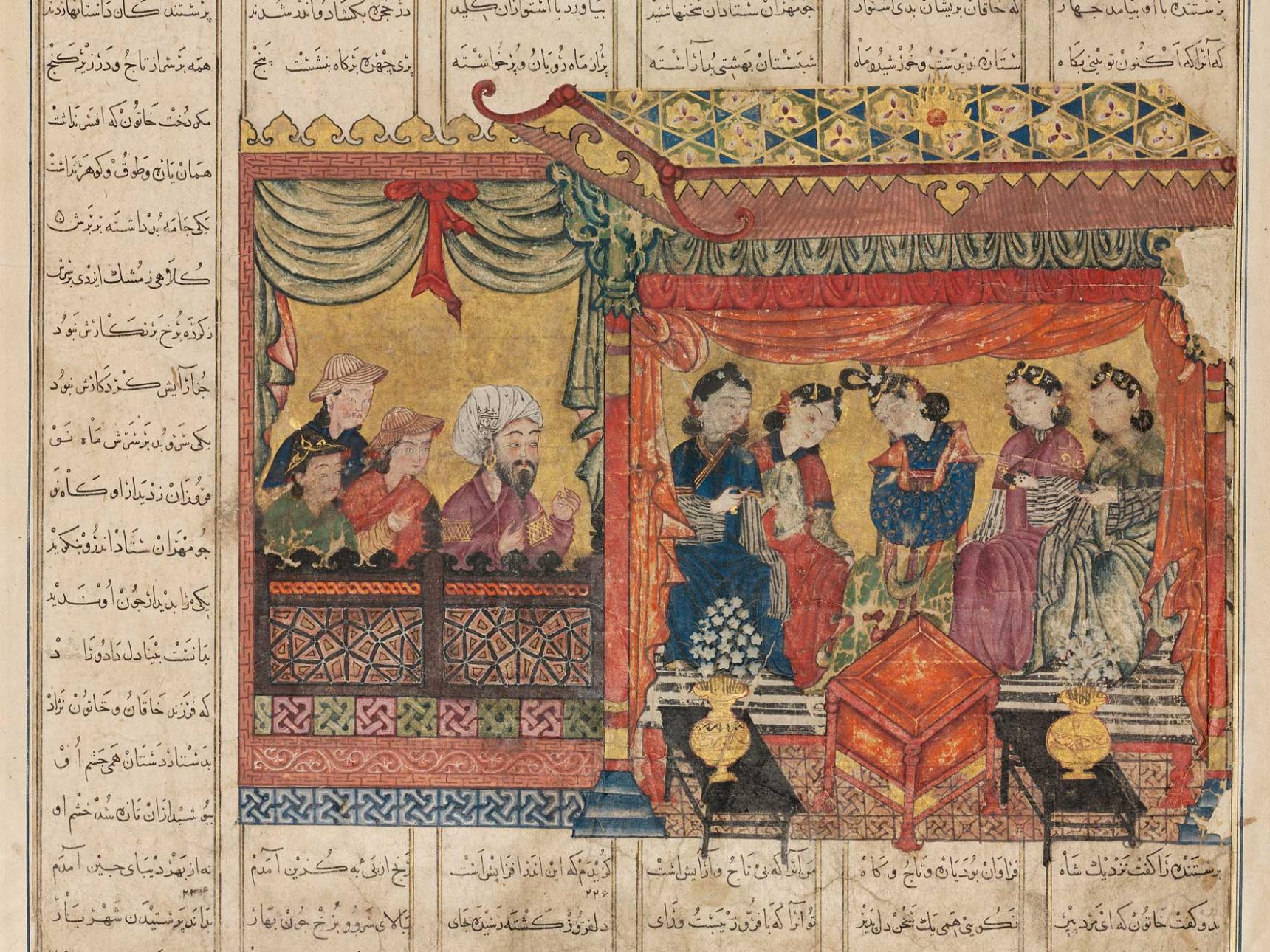
Sassanid nobleman Mihransitad selects a bride for the Persian king from five daughters of the Chinese emperor, 14th century miniature.

The famous Maragheh observatory in Maragheh, Iran, is also known to have had some Chinese astronomers working there alongside Iranian astronomers, and some Iranian astronomical instruments were also being used by astronomers in China. Safavid Iranian art was also partly influenced by Chinese art to an extent. Shah Abbas had hundreds of Chinese artisans in his capital Esfahan. Also, 300 Chinese potters produced glazed tile buildings, and hundreds of others produced metalwork, miniature paintings, calligraphy, glasswork, tile work, and pottery. From E. Sykes's "Iran and Its People": "Early in the seventeenth century, Shah Abbas imported Chinese workmen into his country to teach his subjects the art of making porcelain, and the Chinese influence is very strong in the designs on this ware. Chinese marks are also copied, so that to scratch an article is sometimes the only means of proving it to be of Persian manufacture, for the Chinese glaze, hard as iron, will take no mark."

Of the Chinese Lin family in Quanzhou, Lin Nu, the son of Lin Lu, visited Hormuz in Persia in 1376, married a Persian or an Arab girl, and brought her back to Quanzhou. Lin Nu was the ancestor of the Ming dynasty reformer Li Zhi.

Notable Chinese Muslims who undertook the task of translation of Persian into Chinese include Chang Zhimei (medicine) and Liu Zhi. Although Persian was still spoken among some Muslim communities, due to decreased contact with the Middle East, language use declined.

Ming navy general Zheng He came from a Muslim family and sailed through much of the Old World, including India, Persia, Arabia, and Africa. In his wake, he left many relics, including the Chinese-Persian-Tamil Galle Trilingual Inscription, praising the Buddha, Allah, and Vishnu, respectively, in the three languages.

The Timurid empire wrote its letters to the Ming dynasty in Persian.

=== Qing dynasty ===
By the Qing, although hardly anyone in the court was fluent in Persian, in madrasas, Persian was still studied. In particular, the works of Sadi, Abd-Allāh Abū Bāker, Ḥosayn b. ʿĀlem Ḥosaynī, etc. were taught in said madrasas.

=== Safavid, Afsharid, Zand and Qajar periods ===
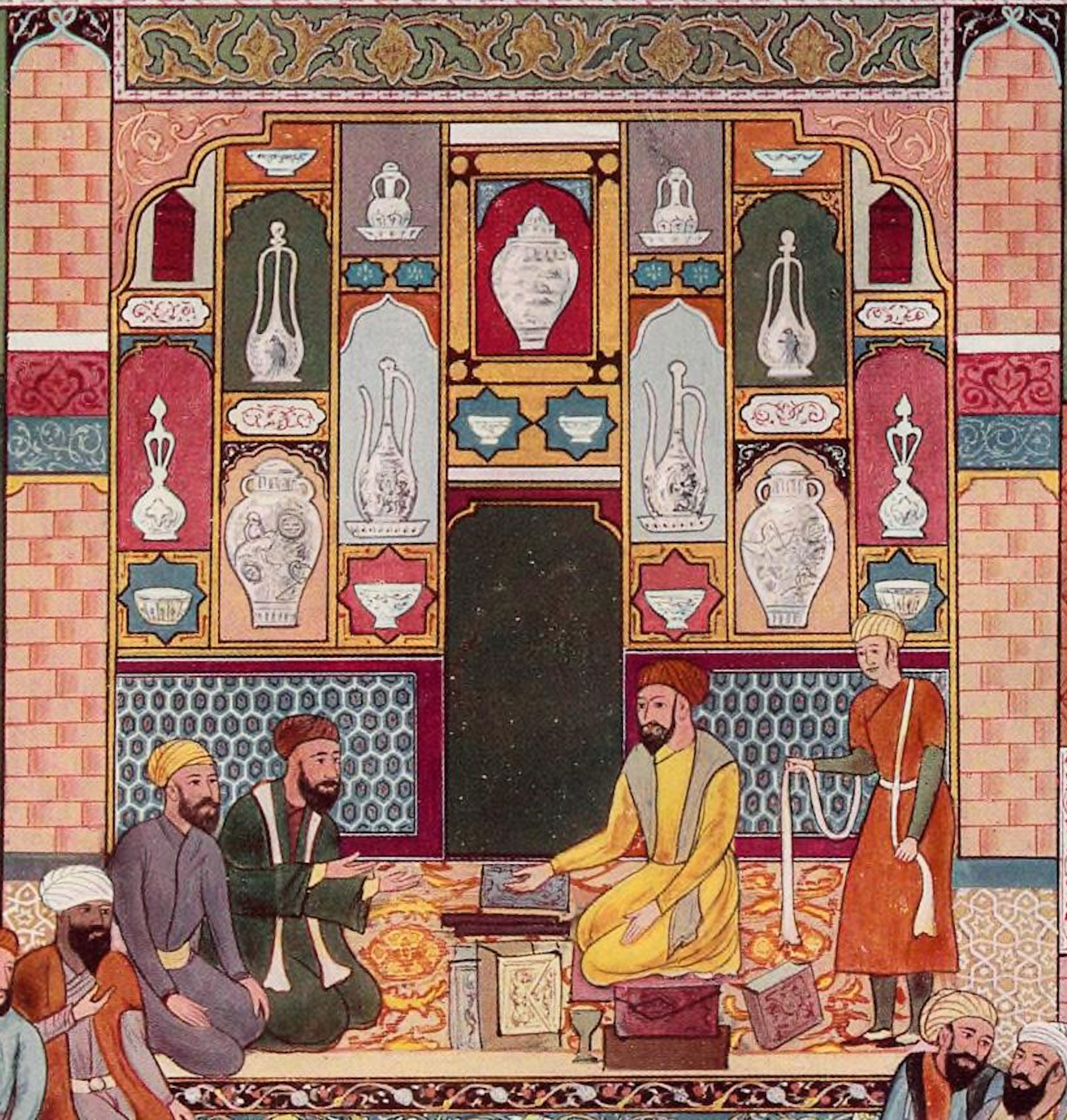
Inside view of a Persian house, with China utensils in decorative niches on the wall. 16th century, Iran.

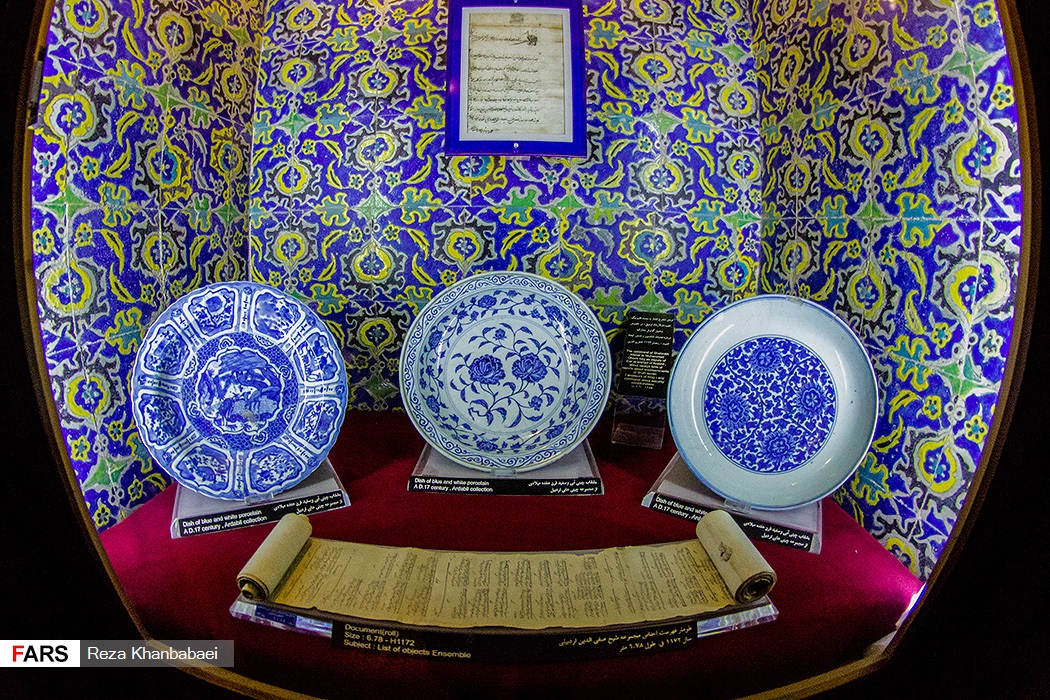
Chinese porcelain dating to the 17th century, in the Chinikana in the Sheikh Safi al-Din Khānegāh and Shrine Ensemble in Ardabil.

During the Safavid period, political relations with China were limited, but cultural and commercial exchange was strong. Chinese porcelain, motifs, and artistic styles heavily influenced Safavid art, and trade continued through the Silk Road and maritime routes. In the Afsharid era, contacts were minimal and mostly indirect, as both states were focused on internal and regional conflicts.

During the Zand period, ties remained mostly restricted to limited trade, with no major diplomatic exchanges recorded. In the Qajar era, relations revived: embassies were exchanged, Iranian envoys visited China, and commercial interaction through Chinese ports increased, marking a renewed phase of diplomatic and economic engagement between the two sides.

=== China and Imperial Iran ===
On 1 June 1920, a friendship agreement was signed between the Republic of China (ROC) and Qajar Persia and the two countries established diplomatic relations at the ministerial level. Ratifications were exchanged on 6 February 1922, with effect on the same day. In 1934, Pahlavi Iran established a consulate in Shanghai for the first time. The consulate was closed in 1937. Official diplomatic relations were established in 1937, with Li Tieh-tseng serving as ambassador representing China. In 1942, China established an embassy in Tehran.

After the founding of the People's Republic of China (PRC) in 1949, Iran continued to maintain diplomatic relations with the ROC government in Taipei and did not recognize the PRC government in Beijing. In 1951, Iran voted at the United Nations General Assembly to condemn PRC involvement in the Korean War. The CIA- and MI6-sponsored coup d'état of 1953 brought Iranian Shah Mohammad Reza Pahlavi closer into the orbit of U.S.-led Western Bloc and their global policy of containing communist elements, which also happened to be the Shah's political opponents domestically. Iran voted in favor of American proposals to prevent the PRC from representing China at the United Nations. In 1958, Mohammad Reza Pahlavi, visited the ROC to meet President Chiang Kai-shek. In the Sino-Indian War in 1962, Iran supported the proposal to condemn the PRC as an aggressor at the UN General Assembly. During this period, the PRC and Iran had only a small amount of trade. As the decade went on, however, relations between China and the Soviet Union worsened while U.S.-Soviet tensions eased, lowering the strategic importance of Iran to the United States. Both Iran and China sought new allies. In 1965, Iran began to abstain from barring the PRC at the UN. In 1969, the Shah declared his support for the PRC's UN membership. Trade between China and Iran increased to $50 million during the 1960s, twenty times greater compared to the 1950s. As Iran's relations with the Soviet Union improved as well, it no longer saw containing communism as a priority, leading to a cooling of its relations with the ROC.

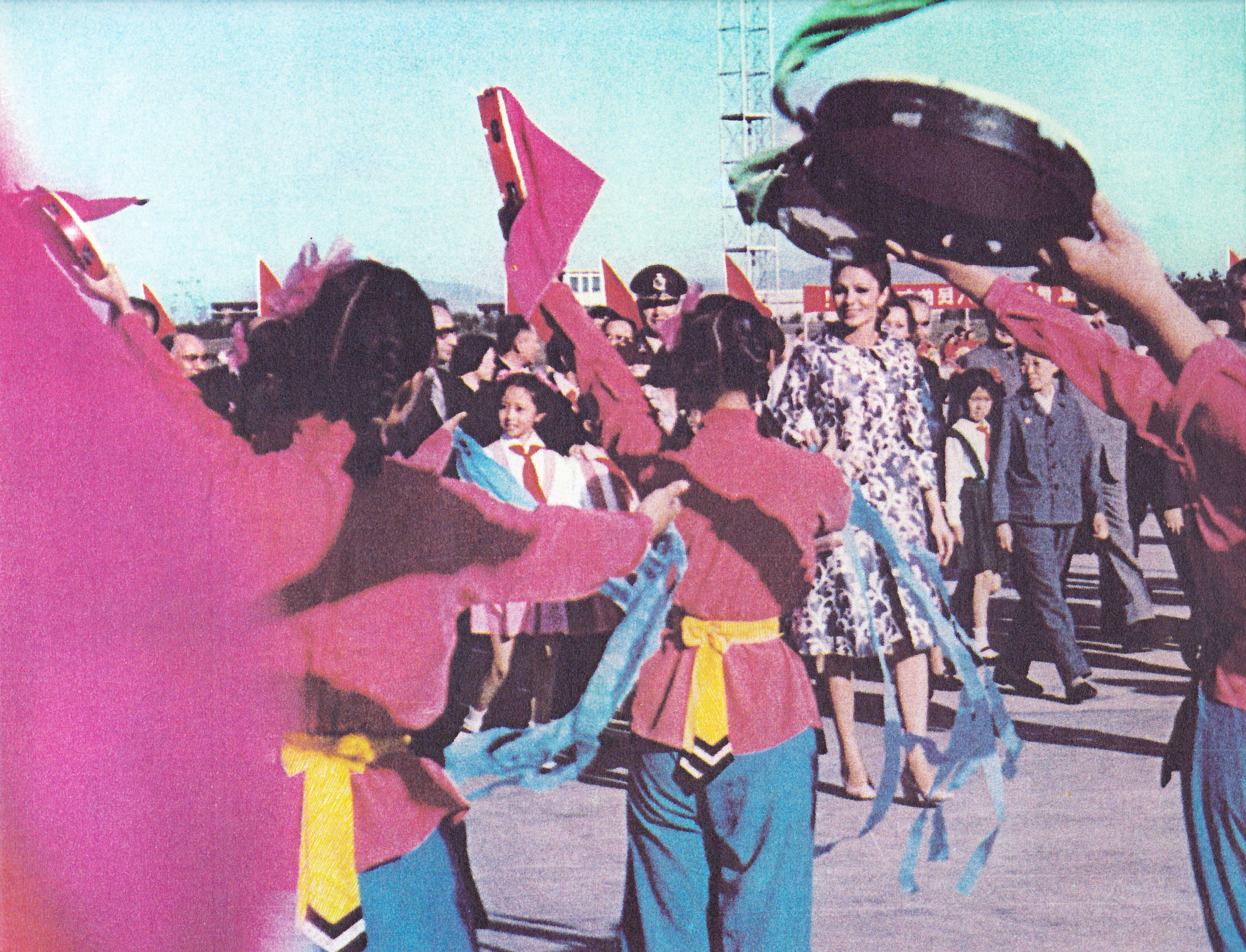
Iranian Empress Farah Pahlavi state visit to China in 1972

Meanwhile, during the 1970s, China and the United States adjusted their diplomatic strategies, hoping to join forces to confront the Soviet Union. As relations between China and the United States relations warmed up, Iran, then an ally of the United States, reacted quickly. On 13 April 1971, the Mohammad Reza Pahlavi sent his twin sister, Ashraf Pahlavi, to China for a secret visit to discuss the establishment of diplomatic relations with Chinese leaders. On the evening of the 13 April, Chinese Premier Zhou Enlai personally hosted Princess Ashraf at the Qianmen Roast Duck Restaurant. On 30 April 1971, the Shah sent his sister, Princess Fatemeh Pahlavi, to China. On 16 August 1971, China and Iran held negotiations on the establishment of diplomatic relations in Islamabad and issued a joint communiqué on the same day, in which Iran recognized the People's Republic of China as the sole legitimate government of China. In October 1971, Pahlavi held a celebration for the 2,500-year celebration of the Persian Empire. The Chinese government sent Zhang Tong, the Chinese ambassador to Pakistan, to attend. The original Chinese government special envoy was Guo Moruo, vice chairman of the Standing Committee of the National People's Congress. However, Guo fell ill on the way after leaving Beijing on 11 October and was unable to go to Iran. On 25 October 1971, Iran supported PRC's bid to replace the ROC as the representative of China in the UN by voting in favor of the United Nations General Assembly Resolution 2758. On 18 September 1972, Iranian Prime Minister Amir-Abbas Hoveyda accompanied Queen Farah Pahlavi on a visit to China. Premier Zhou Enlai personally went to the airport to greet them and accompanied them almost the entire time.

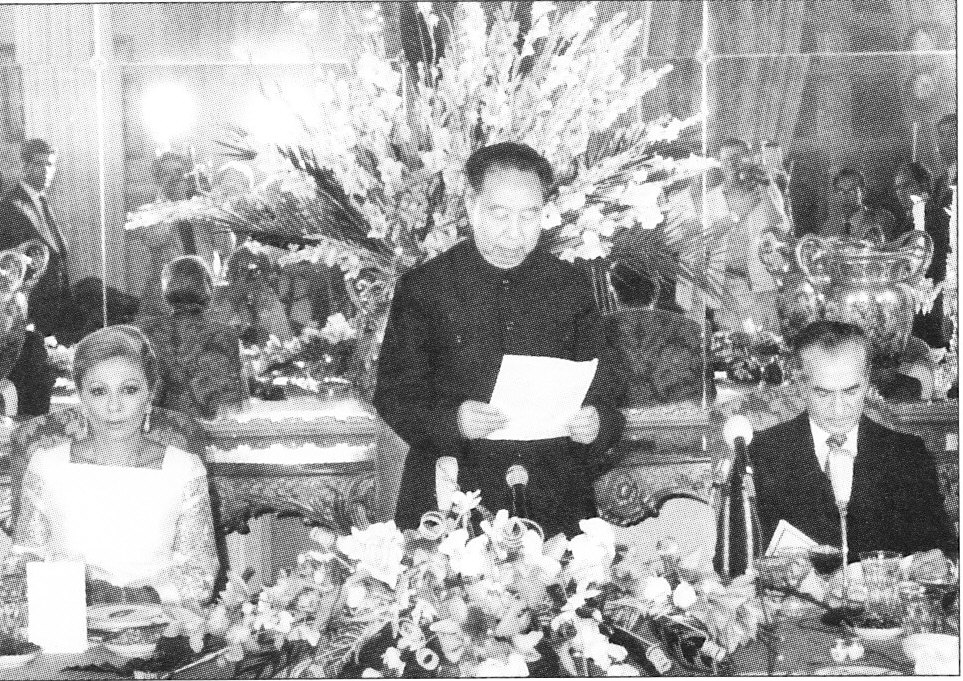
Chinese leader Hua Guofeng with Shah Mohammad Reza Pahlavi during a state visit in Iran, 1978

Chinese leader Mao Zedong proposed the One Line, One Large Area idea when he met with Henry Kissinger, the US National Security Advisor, in 1973, proposing that a horizontal line be formed with the United States, Japan, China, Pakistan, Iran, Turkey, and Europe to jointly oppose Soviet hegemony. The first Iranian embassy was formed in December 1973 and Abbas Aram was appointed to the post, becoming the first Iranian diplomat to serve in China, though the first embassy opened in 1942. In April 1978, the Central Committee of the Chinese Communist Party decided to send Hua Guofeng, the Chairman of the CCP and the Premier of China, to visit Romania and Yugoslavia in August. At that time, the official planes of Chinese state leaders were Boeing 707s, requiring a refueling stop en route to Europe. Tehran, the capital of Iran, was located roughly midway along the flight path and was a crucial transportation hub. Considering Iran's special position in Chinese diplomacy, the CCP Central Committee decided that Hua's plane would stop in Tehran for refueling on the outbound journey and make an official visit to Iran on the return journey via Tehran. That year, Iran was in turmoil, with anti-Pahlavi demonstrations escalating. After careful consideration, Chinese diplomatic officials decided to proceed with Hua's visit to Iran as planned. On 29 August 1978, after arriving in Tehran, Hua, due to the massive scale of the demonstrations, had to cancel all his sightseeing itinerary and travel between the airport, hotel, and royal palace by helicopter. He also met with Mohammad Reza Pahlavi. This visit seriously affected Sino-Iranian relations after the Iranian Revolution, to the point that the Iranian people believed that China was a "friend" of the Pahlavi dynasty and that Hua Guofeng's trip was to cheer on the Shah as the Pahlavi dynasty was about to collapse.

=== China and the Islamic Republic of Iran ===
After the Iranian Revolution, China quickly recognized the new government on 14 February 1979. However, relations between China and Iran cooled despite China's recognition of the new republic. Due to China's close ties with the Pahlavi government, "Down with America, down with Israel, down with China" became a common slogan on the streets of Iran. Officially, the Islamic republic carried out a foreign policy of neither East nor West. Subsequent deterioration of relationship between the Western countries and Iran contributed to increased ties with the PRC. On 14 January 1980, in order to resolve the Iran hostage crisis, the U.S. proposed to impose economic sanctions on Iran in the UN Security Council. The vote count was 10 in favor, 2 against, and 2 abstentions. The Chinese representative did not vote, and the proposal was vetoed by the Soviet Union. Two weeks later, Iran sent a member of parliament, Ali Khamenei (who later became the Supreme Leader of Iran), to China to communicate diplomatic positions. In 1980, China was put into a difficult situation with the outbreak of the Iran–Iraq War in 1980 since China was allied with both nations. China was able to remain outside of the conflict and push for a peaceful resolution to the conflict. Most of the international community sympathized with Iraq and did not support Iran; China was one of the few neutral countries. The two countries grew closer during the Iran-Iraq War because China was an important source of arms for Iran. In 1983, Iranian Foreign Minister Ali Akbar Velayati and other high-ranking officials visited China. Velayati met with Chinese President Li Xiannian. In 1984, Chinese Minister of Foreign Affairs Wu Xueqian visited Iran. Relations between the two countries warmed up and normalization was achieved. In 1985, Iranian Parliament Speaker Akbar Hashemi Rafsanjani, accompanied by Foreign Minister Ali Akbar Vellayati, visited China becoming the highest-ranking Iranian official to visit China since 1979. In May 1989, Iranian President Ali Khamenei visited China, marking the first visit by an Iranian president to the country. In 1990, China signed a long-term nuclear cooperation agreement with Iran that provided for the training of Iranian personnel and the supply of a 27 kW miniature neutron source reactor and two 300 MW Qinshan power reactors. In May 1990, National People's Congress Standing Committee Chairman Wan Li visited Iran. In July 1990, Chinese Premier Li Peng visited Iran, which was followed by a visit to China by Iranian Parliament Speaker Mehdi Karroubi in December 1991. In October 1991, Chinese President Yang Shangkun visited Iran. In September 1992, Iranian President Akbar Hashemi Rafsanjani visited China, where the two sides announced a nuclear cooperation agreement. In August 1994, Iranian First Vice-President Hassan Habibi visited China.

Chinese leader Xi Jinping meeting with Iranian Supreme Leader Ali Khamenei and President Hassan Rouhani, 23 January 2016

In June 2000 Iranian President Mohammad Khatami visited China. In January 2001, Chinese Vice President Hu Jintao visited Iran. In March 2002, Chinese State Councilor Wu Yi visited Iran. In April 2002, Chinese leader Jiang Zemin paid a state visit to Iran, where he met with President Mohammad Khatami and Supreme Leader Ali Khamenei. In 2005, Iranian President Mahmoud Ahmadinejad proposed the Look to the East policy, proposing that Iran strengthen relations with Eastern countries like China. In June 2006, Ahmadinejad visited China. He visited China again in September 2008. He also visited in June 2010 and June 2012. In May 2014, Iranian President Hassan Rouhani visited China. In April 2015, China stated that Iran had been officially accepted as a founding member of its newly founded Asian Infrastructure Investment Bank, with the latter owning 15,808 shares. There has also been recent discussion for Iran to eventually join the Shanghai Cooperation Organisation (SCO), of which it was an observer state, as a full member. In 2016, Chinese leader Xi Jinping paid a state visit to Iran, and the two sides announced the establishment of a comprehensive strategic partnership. That same year, China and Iran signed a comprehensive strategic partnership agreement. This partnership focuses on expanding bilateral cooperation across a large number of sectors, including energy, trade, infrastructure, and military ties. This is thought to be part of a broader effort meant to strengthen the political and economic relationship between the two countries. Both are facing growing pressure from the United States and Western powers. The partnership has facilitated China's increasing role in developing Iran's energy infrastructure and investments in various industrial projects in Iran. During his state visit, Xi also announced his support for Iran's full membership in SCO. In June 2018, President Rouhani visited China to attend the 2018 Qingdao SCO summit. In July 2019, Iran approved visa-free travel for all Chinese citizens, including those in Hong Kong and Macau, with China being one of twelve countries to have direct visa-free access to Iran. In July 2019, UN ambassadors from 50 countries, including Iran, signed a joint letter to the UNHRC defending China's treatment of Uyghurs and other Muslim minorities in the Xinjiang region.

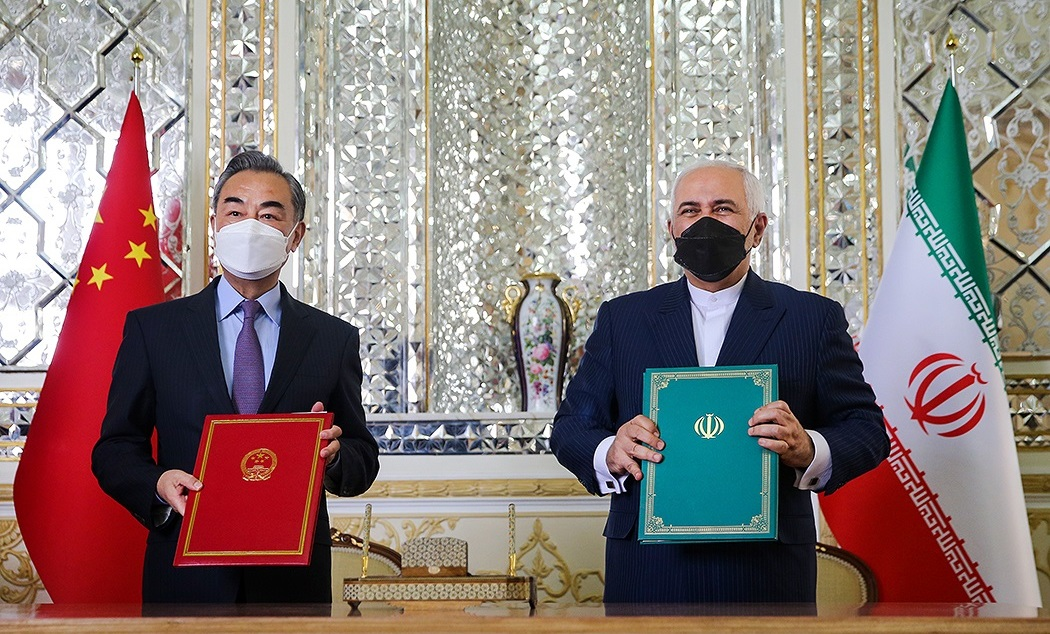
Chinese foreign minister Wang Yi and Iranian foreign minister Mohammad Javad Zarif signing the Iran–China 25-year Cooperation Program

In January 2020, China condemned the assassination of Qasem Soleimani, with the Chinese Foreign Minister Wang Yi saying that the targeted killing of an Iranian general in Iraqi territory by the United States was in violation of international law. In June 2020, Iran was one of 53 countries that backed the Hong Kong national security law at the United Nations. In March 2021, the two countries signed a 25-year cooperation agreement. This agreement is estimated to be worth up to $400 billion. This agreement has been interpreted by the West as a response to the ongoing sanctions on Iran. The agreement has been described as a mutually beneficial initiative for both countries, providing Iran with economic relief, while supporting China's regional ambitions and access to energy resources. After coming to office in 2021, Iranian President Ebrahim Raisi pursued a "look east" policy to deepen ties with China and Russia. Iran joined the SCO in September 2021. In February 2023, Raisi visited China in the first such visit by an Iranian leader to China in more than twenty years. On 10 March 2023, Iran and Saudi Arabia announced that they would normalize their relations, in a deal brokered by China. In January 2024, Iran joined the BRICS. Following the April 2024 Iranian strikes on Israel, Chinese Foreign Minister Wang Yi had a call with Iranian Foreign Minister Hossein Amir-Abdollahian where Wan reiterated Iran's assertion that its attack was a "limited" action taken in self-defense, adding he believed Iran could "handle the situation well and spare the region further turmoil". In June 2025, China's ambassador to the UN Fu Cong condemned Israeli strikes on Iran during the Twelve-Day War. In September 2025, Iranian President Masoud Pezeshkian visited China to attend the 2025 Tianjin SCO summit and the 80th victory parade in Tiananmen square. On 23 January 2026, China voted against a UN Human Rights Council resolution condemning the violent suppression of anti-government protests in Iran. China condemned the US-Israeli attack that started the 2026 Iran war but refrained from offering direct military aid as of March 2026. Chinese Foreign Minister Wang Yi cautioned against efforts to change the government in Iran, emphasizing the lack of popular support such actions. Wang also called for the immediate cessation of military operation in the Middle East, stressing the need to respect Iran's sovereignty, saying "This is a war that should not have happened". Following a two-week ceasefire being declared on 8 April 2026, a CNN report stated that according to U.S. intelligence, China is preparing to ship shoulder-fired anti-air missile systems (MANPADs) to Iran. The American intelligence sources maintained that China intended to transfer the weapons systems through third countries to mask their origin. On 17 May 2026, Iranian Parliament Speaker Mohammad Bagher Ghalibaf was appointed as the special representative for China, proposed by President Masoud Pezeshkian and supported by Supreme Leader Mojtaba Khamenei. In September 2026, at the SCO summit in Kyrgyzstan, Xi met with Iranian President Masoud Pezeshkian.

== Economy ==
China is both Iran's largest trading partner and its primary destination for energy exports. After the Joint Comprehensive Plan of Action (JCPOA) was signed in July 2015, China and Iran agreed to expand trade relations to $600 billion in ten years from January 2016, on the occasion when Chinese leader Xi Jinping paid Hassan Rouhani a state visit. This constitutes an increase of over 1,000%. The agreement was concordant with the Belt and Road Initiative. A total of 17 agreements were signed, including one which relates to the Iranian nuclear program. The Chinese will also help connect Tehran with Mashhad via their high-speed rail technology.

=== Oil and gas ===
One of the main pillars of the relationship is oil and gas. China switched to petroleum primarily to move its energy supply from coal. There was a rapid increase in oil importation from 1974 into the 1990s. By 2025, China purchased over 80 percent of Iran's shipped oil. The China National Petroleum Corporation (CNPC) was granted an $85 million contract to drill 19 wells in the natural gas fields in Southern Iran and signed another similar $13 million contract. Then, again in 2004, an agreement was reached where China would import 270 million tons of natural gas over 30 years from South Par fields, which are the richest natural gas fields in the world, for $70 billion. Another Chinese company, Sinopec Group, gets half-share in Yardarvaran oil fields, worth about $100 billion for the purpose of exploration. Later in 2007, CNPC signed a $3.6 billion deal to develop offshore gas fields in Iran and then signed another $2 billion contract to develop the northern Iranian oil field near Ahvaz. Not only is China helping to develop the oil and gas sector, but China supports Iran's ambitions to bring Caspian Sea oil and gas to Southern Iranian ports through pipelines so the resources can be exported to Europe and Asia. Iran relies upon its oil sales to China to ensure its fiscal well-being. China also sells gasoline to Iran despite international pressures that have halted Iran's ability to get gasoline from other suppliers.

China considers Iran a permanent partner for its exports and a source of its growing energy demand. In March 2004, Zhuhai Zhenrong Corporation, a Chinese state-run company, signed a 25-year contract to import 110 million metric tons of Liquefied Natural Gas (LNG) from Iran. This was followed by another contract between Sinopec and Iran LNG, signed in October of the same year. The deal, worth $100 billion, adds an extra 250 million tons of LNG to China's energy supply, to be extracted from Iran's Yadavaran field over a 25-year period. In January 2009, Iran and China signed a $1.76bn contract for the initial development of the North Azadegan oil field in western Iran. In March, the two countries struck a three-year $3.39 billion deal to produce liquefied natural gas in Iran's mammoth South Pars natural gas field. Because of its limited refining capacity, Iran imports one-third of its refined products, such as petrol, from China.

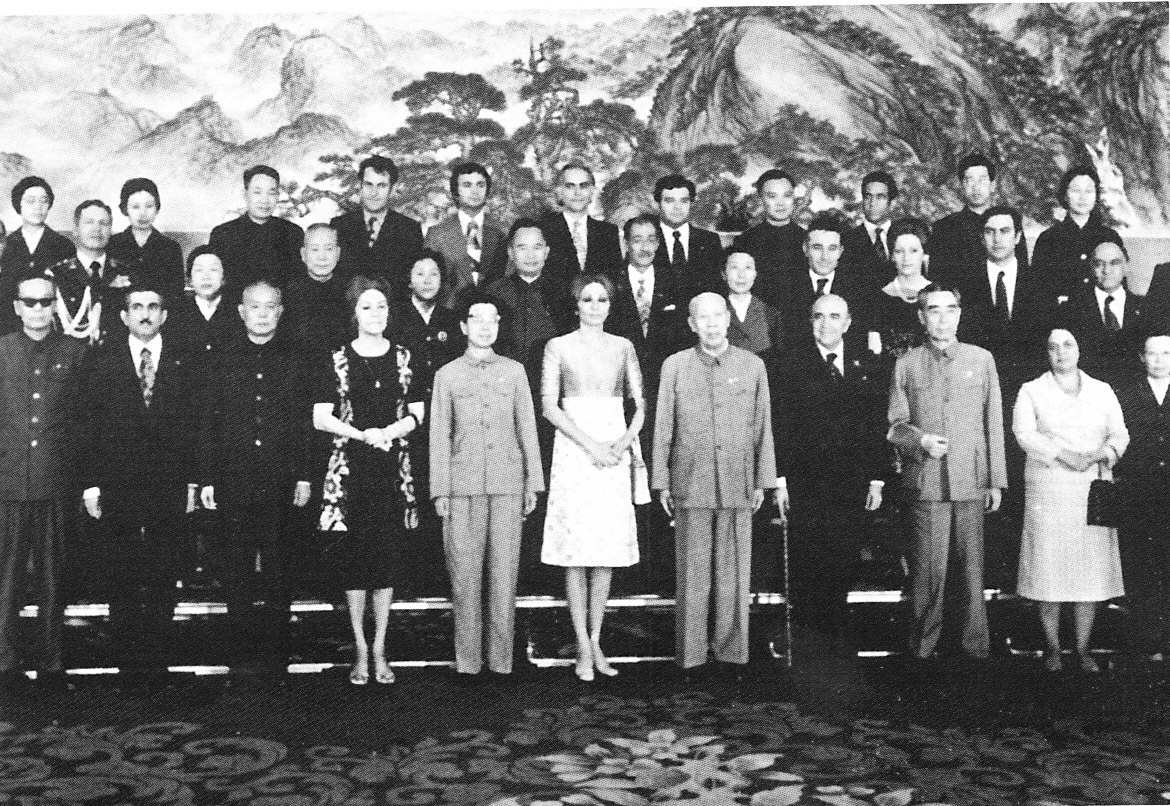
Empress Farah Pahlavi and Prime Minister Amir-Abbas Hoveyda during a state visit to China in 1972

In 2011, the group Green Experts of Iran reported that Beijing and Tehran had signed a deal that would give China exclusive rights to several Iranian oil and natural gas fields through 2024, including rights to build necessary infrastructure there. In return, China promised to treat any foreign attack against these regions as attacks against its own sovereign territory, and will defend them as such. China would need no prior permission from Iran's government to maintain and increase its military presence in the country, and would control the movement of Iranians in and out of these territories. This agreement was the basis for PLA General Zhang Zhaozhong stating, "China will not hesitate to protect Iran even with a Third World War."

China has been Iran's crude oil sink since the JCPOA was signed. In 2017, 64% of an export total of $16.9 billion with China was crude oil. As of 2026, it was estimated that China bought more than 90% of all Iranian oil production.

=== Trade ===
During the Cold War, there were unofficial trade relations between Iran and China that have steadily increased over time. Trade reached $1.627 billion in the 1980s and $15 billion in 2007. In 2001, the volume of trade between Iran and China stood at roughly $3.3 billion, and in 2005, the volume of China-Iranian trade hit $9.2 billion. Iran's Deputy Minister of Commerce Mehdi Ghazanfari speculated that trade exchanges between Iran and China would exceed $25 billion in 2008.

In 2005, exports from China represented 8.3% of the total import market in Iran, giving China the second largest share of the market after Germany. China's exports to Iran have experienced particularly rapid growth in the past five years, with China replacing Japan as the world's second largest exporter to Iran. Iran's imports from China rose by 360% between 2000 and 2005. China is now responsible for about 9.5% of all Iranian imports. In 1988, the Iranian market opened up to Chinese industry when the PRC began economic restructuring.

Once profitable trade relations were established, the PRC invested in Tehran's subway systems, dams, fishery, and cement factories while Iran helped supply China with the highly desired minerals of coal, zinc, lead, and copper. Trade between the two states also included power generation, mining, and transportation equipment, along with arms and consumer goods such as electronics, auto parts, and toys. Iran is full of Chinese products and cars.

Iran–China trade value reached $45 billion in 2011 and was expected to increase to $50 billion by 2012.

Ali Akbar Salehi, Iran's former representative to the International Atomic Energy Agency, said that the two countries "mutually complement each other. They have industry and we have energy resources".

In January 2023, the Overseeing Chief of the Chabahar Free Zone Organization Amir Moghaddam reported that the primary holder dispatch leaving from China docked at Iran's key harbor of Chabahar, marking the foundation of the direct coordinate shipping line between China and Iran's southeastern seaport. He said that Chinese ships already emptied in Bandar Abbas, the capital city of the southern area of Hormuzgan, with their cargo, at that point, being exchanged to Chabahar in Sistan-Baluchistan Territory by means of little ships. With the foundation of the coordinated shipping line between China and Chabahar, cargoes are conveyed ten days prior, whereas fetched of stacking and emptying is decreased by 400 dollars per holder, the official clarified.

In 2023 the volume of Iran's export to China was $4.59 billion. Iran mainly exported to China ore, slag and ash (29.5%), plastic and articles of steel or iron (27.5%) and organic chemical (15.9%). The volume of Chinees export to Iran in 2023 was $10 billion. China mainly exported to Iran machinery, mechanical appliances and parts (22.4%), electrical machinery and electronics (15.5%), cars, tractors, and trucks (24.9%). As of 2025, Iran's largest trading partner is China.

The departure of Iranian ships carrying suspected rocket fuel precursors from a Chinese port has drawn attention, with expert noting the significance of Beijing allowing the vessels to sail amidst the ongoing U.S.-Iran conflict.

=== Infrastructure ===
Line 5 of the Tehran metro began operating in 1999 and was Iran's first metro system. The line was constructed by the Chinese company Norinco.

=== Belt and Road Initiative ===
Countries which signed cooperation documents related to the Belt and Road Initiative

Iran joined the Belt and Road Initiative (BRI) in 2018. As of 2019, Iran was considered to be a key part of China's geopolitical ambitions in central Asia and the Middle East, sometimes described in terms of a new Great Game.

While cargoes are usually shipped between China and Iran by ship, it is also possible to travel between the two countries by train, via Kazakhstan and Turkmenistan (see Eurasian Land Bridge). In 2016, the first direct container train between Yiwu (Zhejiang Province) and Tehran made its way across Asia in 14 days. This is supposed to be the beginning of regular container train service along this route.

Iranians and Chinese are currently renovating rails to connect Ürümqi to Tehran as well as connect Kazakhstan, Kyrgyzstan, Uzbekistan, and Turkmenistan (also see Five-nations railway, Afghanistan–China relations). In another 2016 test run, it took 12 days to deliver freight from Shanghai to Tehran, whereas it would have taken 30 days by sea.

In May 2018, China planned to build a new freight train line with Iran. In 2020, a leaked document showed that a 25-year strategic partnership would be implemented between the two countries, in which China would invest in Iranian infrastructure, transport, and seaports. In exchange, Iran would provide a heavily discounted regular supply of its oil. Above all, the reasons for the timing of this agreement is the rivalry between the US, the main opponent of Iran, and China, the main supporter of Iran, played a major role in taking the step of signing the agreement.

== Politics ==
Open mutual support is seen in Iran's support for the Chinese government following the 1989 Tiananmen Square massacre and Chinese condemnation of the United States' attack on an Iranian passenger plane, among other things.

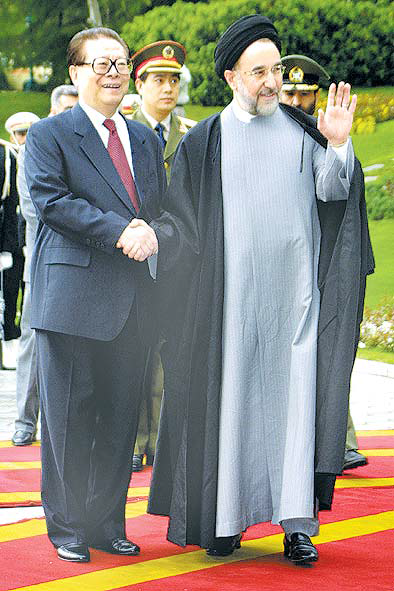
20 April 2002, Chinese leader Jiang Zemin and Iranian President Mohammad Khatami, an official Visitation.

=== Military ===
China is believed to have helped Iran militarily in the following areas: conducting training of high-level officials on advanced systems, providing technical support, supplying specialty steel for missile construction, providing control technology for missile development, and building a missile factory and test range. It is rumored that China is responsible for aiding in the development of advanced conventional weapons, including surface-to-air missiles, combat aircraft, radar systems, and fast-attack missile vessels.

It was not until the 1990s that the relationship between China and Iran came under close scrutiny by the United States. From this scrutiny, it became known that China was using North Korea to traffic arms during the Iran-Iraq war to avoid antagonizing the West, but later cut out the middle man. In the years of 1984–1986, about $1–2 billion worth of arms sales occurred. And then in 1986, Iran obtained Chinese-made anti-ship surface-to-surface missiles that posed a threat to Persian Gulf shipping. In possessing these missiles, Iran is able to control the Strait of Hormuz and all of the naval trade to and from the Gulf countries. In later inquiries, it was discovered that China sold Iran precursor and dual-use chemicals and the technology and equipment needed to use them. In 1996, the Washington Post reported that China was supplying chemical weapons plants in Iran that were destined for the Army. Arms exports began to steadily decline in the 1990s yet China engaged in $400 million worth of arms transfer agreements with Iran. Sales increased to $600 million from 1997 to 2000. On average, it is estimated that China has made $171 million per year in arms exports to Iran since 1982. China discontinued entering new arms export agreements with Iran in 2005.

China and Iran held their first joint naval drill in 2017. These exercises focused on anti-piracy and search-and-rescue operations. In January 2022, Iran, China, and Russia held their third joint naval drills in the northern Indian Ocean. The three countries started joint naval drills in 2019 in the Indian Ocean and the Sea of Oman area. The purpose of this drill is to strengthen security and its foundations in the region, and to expand multilateral cooperation between the three countries to jointly support world peace, maritime security, and create a maritime community with a common future. China and Iran have conducted joint naval drills with Russia in the Sea of Oman and the Indian Ocean in March 2025. According to analysts, these drills have special geopolitical significance in the light of mounting tensions between Iran and the United States.

Iran began importing air defense systems from China, as reported by Middle East Eye. The report indicates that Iran started receiving initial air defense systems from China to enhance its air defenses following the conclusion of the June 2025 conflict (the Twelve-Day War) with Israel and the United States. There were reports of enhanced security, intelligence, military and technology cooperation between Iran and China following the Twelve-Day War. Some reports in Western media and policy think tanks narrowed in on China's support for Iran's rehabilitation of its ballistic missile program.

There are also reports that China has assisted Iran in its remote surveillance technology by providing it with surveillance satellites and access to the latest technologies from Chinese companies. In another development, Iranian officials have stated that Iran plans to use the Chinese BeiDou satellite navigation system as an alternative to Western satellite navigation systems in a bid to cut its technological dependence. During the 2026 war, a CNBC report cited industry analysts who believed that Iran was indeed utilizing BeiDou to improve the accuracy of its missile strikes against adversaries, though both China and Iran declined to comment. Some sources, such as the Washington, DC-based think tank Brookings Institution, have suggested that China has been providing Iran with equipment and materials for air defense systems, anti-ship missiles, ballistic missile components, and dual-use materials, as well as technical and training assistance. On this point, the intelligence firm Dryad Global has said that Iran has been using the income from its sales of oil to China to acquire the Chinese HQ-9 surface-to-air missile system.

Following the implementation of a ceasefire in the 2026 Iran War on 8 April, U.S. intelligence officials stated that China intended to transfer MANPAD air defense systems to Iran, shipping them through third parties to mask their Chinese origin. U.S. President Donald Trump, when referred to the CNN report, warned that China would face "big problems" if it carried through with transferring the anti-aircraft system.

=== Nuclear technology ===
Nuclear cooperation began in the 1980s when China helped build a research reactor and supplied four other research reactors. Continued aid came in the form of helping Iran construct a uranium hexafluoride enrichment plant near Isfahan and the resumption of construction on a nuclear power plant at Bushehr that was left uncompleted by the French and Germans. In 1991, nuclear exports to Iran were discovered by the International Atomic Energy Association, which contained three types of uranium. A 1990 covert nuclear agreement was also discovered. This discovery was followed by an unprecedented nuclear cooperation agreement in 1992. The agreement was signed despite U.S. protests to have China limit its nuclear cooperation with Iran. Direct nuclear cooperation later ended, but there is speculation over whether there remains indirect nuclear cooperation. In 2005, seven Chinese firms were suspected of selling nuclear weapons technology and all 7 had sanctions placed upon them. Those firms were banned from trading with the United States for two years. There also continues to be Chinese nuclear experts, scientists, and technicians present in Iran.

In June 2006, China joined other members of the United Nations Security Council and Germany to launch the P5+1, joined in diplomatic efforts with Iran with regard to its nuclear program. In July 2006, China voted in favor of the United Nations Security Council Resolution 1696, which expressed concerns over Iran's nuclear program. China also voted in favor of the UN Security Council Resolution 1737 in December 2006. which imposed sanctions on Iran, and the UN Security Council Resolution 1747 in March 2007, which tightened the sanctions. It voted in favor of the UN Security Council Resolution 1803 in March 2008, which demanded Iran to cease and desist from any uranium enrichment, and the UN Security Council Resolution 1835 in September 2008, which reaffirmed four previous UNSC resolutions. In June 2010, China voted in favor of the UN Security Council Resolution 1929, which imposed a fourth round of sanctions against Iran over its nuclear program. From 2014 to 2025, China was a part of the negotiations leading to the Iran nuclear deal. In 2015, China was part of the Iran nuclear deal framework. It was one of the signatories of the Joint Comprehensive Plan of Action in July 2015, and voted in favor of the UN Security Council Resolution 2231 that lifted the previous sanctions on Iran.

After the US withdrew from the JCPOA, China sought to preserve the deal. China emphasized that all parties should return to the JCPOA. It worked with the remaining signatories (Russia, France, Germany, and the United Kingdom) in an effort to develop avenues such as Instrument in Support of Trade Exchanges which might result in Iran's continued compliance and facilitate legitimate trade with Iran amid the US-imposed sanctions on Iran.

On 16 November 2021, US President Joe Biden and Chinese leader Xi Jinping talked about their positions in the resumption of negotiations with Iran on reviving the 2015 nuclear deal.

China's government has raised concern about Iran's increase in stockpiling and uranium enrichment following the US withdrawal from the JCPOA.

In September 2026, in a UN Security Council session, China joined Russia to veto the renewal of nuclear sanctions monitoring in Iran by UN experts, citing its opposition to Western pressure on Iran.

=== Sanctions ===
Iran relies on China's veto power on the United Nations Security Council to protect it from US-led sanctions. China is known for its preference of diplomacy over sanctions. This tradition includes China's (along with Russia's) opposition to UN sanctions against Iran. In 1980, China refused to support the UN arms embargo against Iran and further abstained from voting on US sanctions against Iran. Only in 2010, under US pressure, did China join Russia to support the UN sanctions on Iran.

In 2018, the US ordered Canada to arrest and detain Meng Wanzhou, CFO of Huawei, for 'illegally dealing with' and allegedly violating sanctions against Iran.

=== Ideology ===
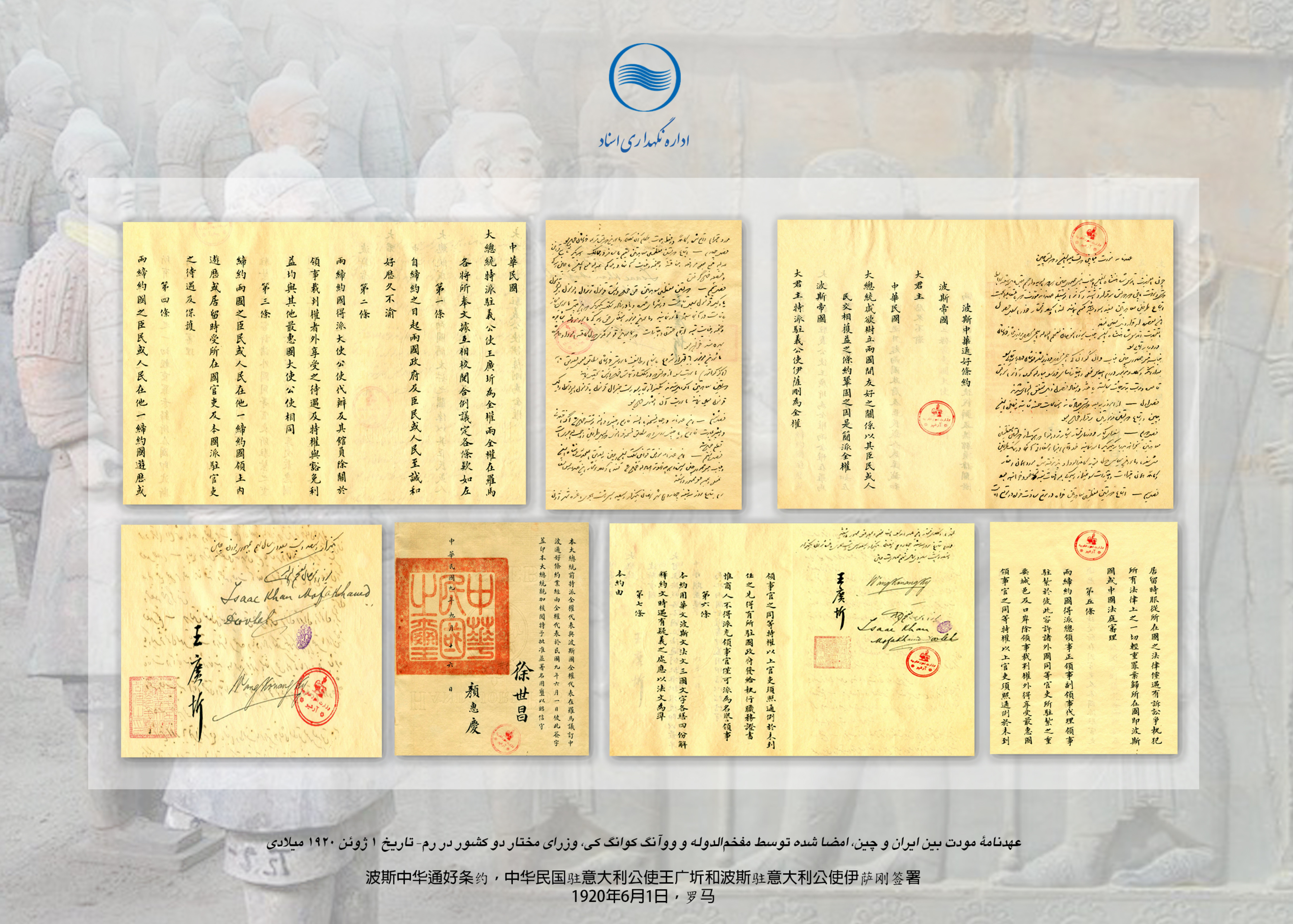
The image of the peace treaty between Iran and China signed on 1 June 1920, in Rome, Italy

China has been at times careful in its deals with Iran to avoid antagonizing its own relationship with the U.S. and Israel. China's approach toward the Israel-Iran conflict is to put economics ahead of political, ideological, or humanitarian interests and sympathies, and it seems China has found a balance on how to work well with the two enemies.

The cooperation emerges partly from Chinese and Iranian recognition as fellow heirs to great civilizations and because Iran has emerged as the regional leader in the Middle East. While there is also a shared distrust of the United States' government and its interests, many young Chinese and Iranians at the same time admire certain aspects of American society and culture. There is also Iranian admiration for China's rapid economic growth, and for the most part, their economic contributions to Iran are appreciated and respected. Some analysts argue that Iran can use its links with China to build more links across Asia while remaining insulated from potential U.S. attack.

China has generally supported the Iran-backed government of Bashar al-Assad in Syria, joining Russia in vetoing several U.N. resolutions condemning Assad's actions in the Syrian civil war, and strongly opposing Western interference in the conflict, arguing that outside intervention would further worsen and complicate the situation. It has also allegedly been increasing military links with Syria in recent years, albeit in a more limited sense than Moscow, partly because of the presence of Uyghur militant rebels on the side of the Syrian rebels.

Former lawmaker Ali Motahari tweeted in August 2020 how it was a failure for the Islamic republic that the US protested against "China's treatment and torture of Muslims from Xinjiang to eradicate the Islamic culture from that region" while Iran remained silent due to of its economic needs; he added that "Chinese Muslims are no different from Yemeni or Palestinian Muslims". Conservative lawmakers and news editors defended China by saying the country just had problems with Wahabi Takfiri ideology, not Islam in general. In a 2021 meeting with a group of university students, former President Mahmoud Ahmadinejad wondered why Iran was silent on China's "Uyghur genocide".

In 2021, the Iranian embassy in China published a series "An Iranian Diplomat's Xinjiang Diary" which related observations of religious respect in Xinjiang and contended that allegations of forced labor in Xinjiang were false.

=== Persian Gulf islands ===
In December 2022, Chinese leader Xi Jinping visited Saudi Arabia, where he attended a summit with states of the Gulf Cooperation Council (GCC). The joint statement issued by China and the GCC countries called for peaceful resolution of the islands dispute with the United Arab Emirates. Iranian Foreign Minister Hossein Amir-Abdollahian reacted to the joint statement by saying "The three islands of Abu Musa, Greater Tunb and Lesser Tunb in the Persian Gulf are inseparable parts of Iranian soil and eternally belong to this motherland. We have no qualms about the necessity of other parties respecting Iran's territorial integrity", deputy chief of staff for political affairs to the Iranian president Mohammad Jamshidi said "A reminder to colleagues in Beijing. While Saudi along with the US backed ISIS/Al-Qaeda in Syria and brutalized Yemen, Iran fought terrorist groups to restore regional stability and security and to prevent the spread of insecurity toward both the East and the West", while Nasser Kanaani, spokesman for the Iranian foreign ministry, said Iran had conveyed its "strong discontent". Chinese Ambassador to Iran Chang Hua was summoned to the foreign ministry. In December 2022, Chinese Vice Premier Hu Chunhua visited Iran, where he met with First Vice President Mohammad Mokhber, where he said that "China supports the national sovereignty, territorial integrity and national honor of Iran and the fight against foreign interference". Hu also met with President Ebrahim Raisi, who said that some of the stances raised during Xi's visit to Saudi Arabia had created "dissatisfaction of the Iranian nation and government" and that "Iran seriously demands compensation for these positions".

In June 2024, China reaffirmed its position on the disputed Persian Gulf islands of Abu Musa and Greater and Lesser Tunbs, which are administered by Iran by claimed by the UAE, stating its support for efforts by the United Arab Emirates to achieve a peaceful resolution, despite objections from Iran. Tehran responded by summoning the Chinese ambassador in a rare diplomatic protest, criticizing China's repeated backing of UAE's claims and urging China to revise its stance. In December 2025, China again drew criticism from Iran after Beijing, in a joint statement with the UAE, expressed support for efforts to reach a peaceful resolution of the dispute over the Persian Gulf islands. Iranian media and political figures sharply condemned Beijing for what they described as a double standard, arguing that China's stance undermined Iran's territorial integrity while contradicting its own firm positions on sovereignty issues such as Taiwan. Conservative lawmaker Ahmad Naderi said China could not uphold the One China policy while questioning Iran's territorial integrity, and warned that Iran had so far shown restraint over China's treatment of Muslims in Xinjiang and "acted rationally" but could reconsider if its sovereignty was challenged. Hardline editor Hossein Shariatmadari likewise argued that China's stance implied its own claims over Taiwan and other territories could be disputed.

== Society ==
There are several historic social connections between the two states. Although the two societies psychologically identify with one another because they both share the national pride and historical identity that comes along with being the descendants of two great empires and modern successor-states to ancient civilizations, there was limited interaction after the Chinese Communist Revolution in 1949. Social interactions improved after the 1960s. The relationship between both countries includes also soft-power and digital diplomacy.

According to The Diplomat in January 2021, anti-Chinese sentiment in Iran was increasing in due to China's economic activity and social differences between the two countries. A September 2021 poll done by the Center for International and Security Studies at Maryland had 42% of Iranian respondents holding an unfavorable view of China compared to 58% holding a favorable view. Gallup polling for 2023 had 51% of Iranians approving of China's leadership which was higher than approval of their own (43%), Russia's1 (31%), and US's leadership (10%); the results had been consistent with Gallup data from 2021 and 2022 on Iranian approval of Chinese and American leadership.

About 2,000 Chinese live in Tehran as of 2005, and 70 Chinese companies have relocated to Iran.

=== Intermarriage ===
Iran and China have a long history of intermarriages, since at least the Tang. Immigrant communities of Persian Muslims in China intermarried with local women, forming part of the modern Hui people. At the same time, Persian women also intermarried with Chinese men: see Lin Nu, Liu Chang (Southern Han), Wang Zongyan (married Li Shunxian), and the Zhengde Emperor. Mixed descendants include Li Zhi (philosopher) and Hu Dahai.

Aurel Stein discovered 5 letters written in Sogdian, known as the "Ancient Letters", in an abandoned watchtower near Dunhuang in 1907. One of them was written by a Sogdian woman named Miwnay who had a daughter named Shayn, and she wrote to her mother Chatis in Sogdia. Miwnay and her daughter were abandoned in China by Nanai-dhat, her husband who was also Sogdian like her. Nanai-dhat refused to help Miwnay and their daughter after forcing them to come with him to Dunhuang and then abandoning them, telling them they should serve the Han Chinese. Miwnay asked one of her husband's relatives, Artivan, and then asked another Sogdian man, Farnkhund, to help them, but they also abandoned them. Miwnay and her daughter Shayn were then forced to become servants of Han Chinese after living on charity from a priest. Miwnay cursed her Sogdian husband for leaving her, saying she would rather have been married to a pig or dog. Another letter in the collection was written by the Sogdian Nanai-vandak, addressed to Sogdians back home in Samarkand informing them about a mass rebellion by Xiongnu Hun rebels against their Han Chinese rulers of the Western Jin dynasty, informing his people that every single one of the diaspora Sogdians and Indians in the Chinese Western Jin capital Luoyang died of starvation due to the uprising by the rebellious Xiongnu, who were formerly subjects of the Han Chinese. The Han Chinese emperor abandoned Luoyang when it came under siege by the Xiongnu rebels and his palace was burned down. Nanai-vandak also said the city of Ye was no more as the Xiongnu rebellion resulted in disaster for the Sogdian diaspora in China.

Sogdians were called "Hu" (胡) by the Chinese during the Tang dynasty. Central Asian "Hu" women were stereotyped as barmaids or dancers by Han in China. Han Chinese men engaged in mostly extra-marital sexual relationships with them as the "Hu" women in China mostly occupied positions where sexual services were sold to patrons like singers, maids, slaves, and prostitutes. Southern Baiyue girls were exoticized in poems. Han men did not want to legally marry them unless they had no choice, such as if they were on the frontier or in exile, since the Han men would be socially disadvantaged and have to marry non-Han. The task of taking care of herd animals like sheep and cattle was given to "Hu" slaves in China.

== Culture ==
There has been longstanding cultural exchange between China and Iran. A modern-day example of such an exchange is the opening of Chinese restaurants in Tehran. China wants to create a positive image of itself, in order to uphold existing and future relations. Iran's similar attempts to promote its culture inside China have been received with open arms. In addition, China opened the Confucius Institute at the University of Tehran and at the University of Mazandaran.

=== Film and television ===
Beijing invited Iranian filmmaker Majid Majidi alongside four other nonlocal film directors to each direct a short film on the locals' preparation for the 2008 Olympics; he was then awarded the gold medal of the Bird's Nest Stadium for his short, titled Colors Fly. Majidi was also granted the title of honorary professor at the Beijing Film Academy in 2018, with his films Children of Heaven and The Song of Sparrows being appended as educational materials for the Chinese Academy. Joe Zihao—cultural advisor of the Embassy of China, Tehran—praised Iranian cinema in 2023 for its moral themes and humanity, noting that Majidi's film The Color of Paradise was featured as class material in Chinese film colleges.

In September 2021, Iranian filmmaker Narges Abyar was granted the title of honorary professor at Xi'an Jiaotong University. She served as script writer and co-producer for the 2024 Sino-Iranian film Chang'an Chang'an, marking the first instance of collaboration between Chinese and Iranian filmmakers.

=== Literature ===
Li Shunxian is a Persian-Chinese woman who wrote celebrated Chinese poetry during the Tang dynasty.

Ha Dechen and Wang Jingzhai helped translate Persian literature into Chinese. Sadi's works are particularly well-known and have been broadcast on Chinese media.

=== Linguistics ===
Mainly through Silk Road trade, Chinese borrowed Middle Persian words for exotic commodities. Oddly, these loanwords are typically themselves loans from a pre-Iranian substrate, e.g. Elamite or BMAC:

Chinese loanwords from Persian
Term	Chinese	Pinyin	Wade–Giles	Persian equivalent	Etymologies
lion	獅/狮	shī	shi	شیر šīr	
alfalfa	苜蓿	mù-xū	mu-hsü	buksuk	MChin mḭuk-sḭuk
grape	葡萄/蒲桃	pú táo	p'u t'ao	باده bāde 'wine, must' < MPers bādag	MChin buo-dâu < LHan Chin bɑ-dɑu < Bactrian *bādāwa
pomegranate	(安) 石榴	(ān) shí líu	(an) shi liu	آرتساخ arsak	MChin.ân-źḭäk-lḭəu (< -lḭog) < *anārak; cf. Sogdian n'r'kh (nāraka)
amber	琥珀	hǔpò	hup'o	کهربا kahrobā < MPers kah-rubāy	MChin xuo^{B}-pʰɐk, or rather from southwestern Asiatic *χarupah
wolfberry	枸杞	gǒuqǐ	kouch'i	گوجه gojeh 'plum, greengage'	
suona	嗩吶	suǒnà	sona	سورنا sornāy	
sweet almond	巴旦木	badanmù	patanmu	بادام baadaam	
cup	盞/盏	zhǎn	chan	جام jam	Though likely related, it is unknown which one was derived from the other.

Huihuihua is a dialect of Chinese with more Persian and Arabic words.

The Galle Trilingual Inscription is associated with the voyages of Zheng He.

== See also ==
- Afghanistan–China relations (parts of Afghanistan historically were part of Persian empires and Greater Iran)
- Foreign relations of Imperial China
- Foreign relations of Iran
- Chinese people in Iran
- Iranians in China
- Narsieh
- Peroz III
- Sino-Roman relations
