= Chinese people in Iran =

Chinese-Iranians/Chinese-Persians
Total population
- 5,000 - 9,000

Regions with significant populations
- Tehran and other major cities

Languages
- Chinese; Persian (not widely spoken)

Religion
- Christianity · Buddhism · Islam · non-provocative Atheism · Other

Related ethnic groups
- Overseas Chinese

Chinese people in Iran form one of the smaller groups of overseas Chinese; Iran's total Chinese population is estimated at between 2,000 and 3,000 people.

== History ==
Han Chinese general Guo Baoyu campaigned with Genghis in Central Asia against the Khwarezmian empire and his grandson Guo Kan campaigned under Hulagu at the Nizari fortresess of Maymundiz and Alamut as well as at Baghdad in 1258 in Iraq. They were direct descendants of Guo Ziyi.

Khitan and Han Chinese administrators were sent to Bukhara and Samarqand to govern by the Mongols in the 1220s and this was witnessed by Qiu Chuji on his way to meet Genghis Khan in Afghanistan. Chinese siege engineers were deployed in Iran and Iraq by the Ilkhanate. The Khitan Yelü Chucai was sent by the Mongols to Central Asia

The war between Qaidu and Kublai wrecked the economy of Uighuria (Qocho) and stopped trade between China and West Asia and Europe. During the war between Kublai Khan and Kaidu the Uyghurs of Qocho fled Qaidu's assaults into Gansu under Yuan control from Turfan, in 1283 placing Yongchang as their capital and between 1270-1275 making Gansu's city of Qamil their capital. Uyghur subjects fled along with the royal court. The Mongols sent new people to repopulate the Jaxartes river (lower Syr Darya) based city of Yangikent (Iamkint or Sakint) after deporting and killing the natives. The upper Yenisei region of Qianqianzhou received many Han Chinese artisans and the western Mongolia based military base and granary city of Chinqai received many Han Chinese artisans put there by Mongols as heard in 1221-1222 by Li Zhichang who was going to Central Asia. Kublai khan sent southern Han Chinese farmers from the Southern Song repeatedly to the Siberian Kyrgyz region of Yenisei in 1272 and before that year as well. He also sent them farming equipment and oxen. Tanguts, Khitans and Han Chinese were sent to take care of gardens and fields in the depopulated and sacked city of Samarkand where only 25% of the original 100,000 households survived the Mongol sacking and Han Chinese artisans were "everywhere" in the ruined city as witnessed on 3 December 1221. They managed to rehabilitate and reconstruct the city since Samarqand was praised as a productive flourishing area before at least 1225 when the Khitan Yelu Chucai came there. Mongke send Chang De to Hulagu in 1259. He went across Central Asia. He said "numerous Chinese growing wheat, barley, millet and [other] grains" lived around Lake Qizilbash and the Ulungur river in north Dzungaria and the cities of Almaliq and Tiermuer Chancha had many Han Chinese from Shaanxi in the Ili river valley. He said "the Muslim populace [there] has become mixed with the Chinese and over time their customs have gradually come to resemble those of the Middle Kingdom." During Mongke's rule in the 1250s in Iran in the 13th century, Iran received thousands of Han Chinese farmers. Han Chinese were the plurality in the Iranian Azerbaijan city of Khoy as of 1340 as testified by Mustawfi. Han Chinese in Khoy and Tabriz in Iranian Azerbaijan were originally sent to Marv by the Mongols before being sent to the Iranian Azerbaijani cities as recorded by Rashid al-Din.

Rashid al-din said that the Chinese millet grain known as tuki was brought by Han Chinese first to Marv in Turkmenistan and then to Iranian Azerbaijan in Khoy and Tabriz. Later Han Chinese were reported to be the most significant ethnicity generations later in Khoi around 1340 when Mustawfi wrote about them. Rashid al-din wrote it in 1310. And local Muslims in Almalik lived with Han Chinese and Han Chinese were employed as guards and millet, barley and wheat farmers around Beshbalik and worked in Samarkand as seen in 1259 by Liu Yu. Wheat and hemp were grown next to mud huts near the Kerulun river by Han Chinese farmers in 1247 near Karakorum as seen by Zhang Dehui. Han Chinese made up 70% of herders in Mongolia as seen by Xuting and Peng Daya. Siberia's Upper Yeniesei area, Samarkand and western Mongolia all had Han Chinese craftsmen as seen by Li Zhichang in 1221-1222. He visited Balkh, Samarkand, Tashkent when he went to Central Asia and Mongolia form Shandong.

The Tabriz based Rob'-e Rashidi and the Maraghe observatory in Ilkhanid Iran had scientists and scholars of Chinese origin. The "Book of Precious Presents or the Medicine of the Chinese People" (Tansuq-name ya tebb-e ahl-e Kheta) was translated by people working under RAshid-al-Din Fazl-Allah to Persian from Chinese and it was about Chinese medicine.

Rashid al-Din wrote about Chinese culture and history. Oljeitu's birth was witnessed by Rashid al-Din. The Sunni convert Jew Rashid al-Din was executed after the Ilkhanate became Shia.

Han Chinese were sent to the Upper Yenisei valley as weavers, into Samarkand and Outer Mongolia as craftsmen as noticed by Ch'ang-ch'un in 1221-22 when he travelled to Kabul from Beijing and they moved to Russia and Iran. The Euphrates and Tigris basins were irrigated by Chinese hydraulic engineers and in 1258 at the siege of Baghdad one of Hulagu Khan's generals was Han Chinese. Because of the Mongols, Chinese influenced architecture, music, ceramics and Persian miniatures in the Golden Horde and Il-khan. Han Chinese, Mongols, Uighurs, Venetians and Geonese all lived in Tabriz were paper money was introduced and movable type printing and wood engraving as well as paper money, printed fabrics and playing cards spread from china to Europe due to the Mongols. wood engraving which was Chinese was mentioned in the 1313 book "Treasure of the Il-khan on the Sciences of Cathay" which was about Chinese medicine and translated by Rashid al-Din. The Mongols brought the Chinese idea of paper currency to Iran in 1294 where the name of the currency, chaw, was taken from the Chinese word Chao.

During the Safavid dynasty, Abbas I (reigned 1587–1629) brought 300 Chinese potters to Iran to enhance local production of Chinese-style ceramics. From E. Sykes's "Persia and Its People": "Early in the seventeenth century, Shah Abbas imported Chinese workmen into his country to teach his subjects the art of making porcelain, and the Chinese influence is very strong in the designs on this ware. Chinese marks are also copied, so that to scratch an article is sometimes the only means of proving it to be of Persian manufacture, for the Chinese glaze, hard as iron, will take no mark."

Of the Chinese Li family in Quanzhou, Li Nu, the son of Li Lu, visited Hormuz in Persia in 1376, converted to Islam, married a Persian or an Arab woman, and brought her back to Quanzhou. Li Nu was the ancestor of the Ming Dynasty reformer Li Chih.

In 1756, the Dutch reported that 80 Chinese families lived in Kharg Island, where they worked as farmers.

The numbers of expatriates from the People's Republic of China began to increase noticeably between 2002 and 2005.

== Business and employment ==
Most modern Chinese expatriates work on construction or other engineering projects; a few run import/export companies or other small businesses. Large-scale investment projects are also becoming more common; businessmen from Zhejiang began building Iran's first Chinese trade complex in 2006. The 330,000 square-metre site in the south of the country, located five kilometres from Khorramshahr and twenty kilometres from the Iraqi border, is expected to contain 1,500 businesses and cost RMB600 million to complete.

== Cultural integration ==
One People's Daily reporter described Chinese people in Iran often have trouble adapting to local life. They live in a separate sphere from Iranians. Most cannot speak much Persian. Because the number of Chinese in the country is so small, Chinese people are typically taken to be Koreans or Japanese people instead, unlike in other countries where the opposite mistake is more common. Chinese cuisine is largely unavailable. Aside from Chinese people married to Iranians, international students are the group of Chinese in Iran best integrated into mainstream society, in terms of lifestyle and language. Their total number is estimated at 100; unlike other Chinese residents, most live outside of Tehran, because the number of scholarships offered by universities in the capital has been decreasing. There is a small Chinatown in Iran built on a Chinese theme, known as Mahale Chiniha.

== See also ==
- China–Iran relations
- Chinese diaspora
- Immigration to Iran
- Iranians in China
- Koreans in Iran
