= Embassy of China, Tehran =

Diplomatic mission of the People's Republic of China in Iran

Embassy of China in Tehran Chinese: 中国驻伊朗大使馆 Persian: سفارت جمهوری خلق چین در جمهوری اسلامی ایران
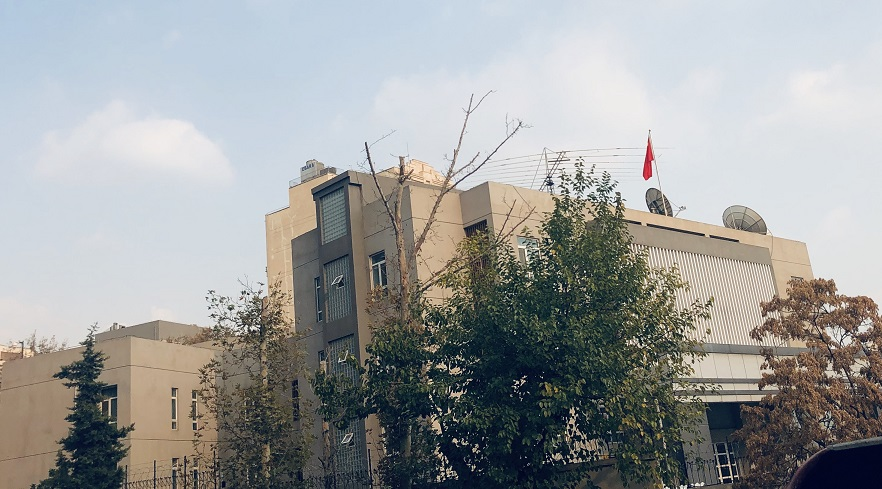

- Location within Tehran Location within Iran
- Location: Tajrish, Tehran, Iran
- Address: No.73rd Movahed Danesh Ave., Aghdasiyeh, Tehran
- Coordinates: 35°48′16″N 51°28′37″E
- Ambassador: Hua Chang
- Website: ir.china-embassy.gov.cn/chn/

Embassy of China in Tehran（Persian: سفارت جمهوری خلق چین در جمهوری اسلامی ایران, Chinese: 中國駐伊朗大使館）is the official diplomatic mission of the People's Republic of China in the Islamic Republic of Iran.

== List of Ambassadors ==
Diplomatic agrément/Diplomatic accreditation	Ambassador	Chinese language zh:中国驻伊朗大使列表	Observations	Premier of the People's Republic of China	President of Iran	Term end
1937	Li Tieh-tseng	zh:李铁铮		Chiang Kai-shek	Reza Shah	October 4, 1945
June 26, 1946	Zheng Yitong	郑亦同	(* 1904 1974) posted in Sydney	Chiang Kai-shek	Mohammad Reza Shah	August 18, 1949
January 1, 1956	Wu Nan-ju	zh:吴南如	(* September 23, 1898 May 12, 1975): 1926: first class legation secretary in London, then employed in the Division of Europe.; In 1941 he was envoy in Moscow and envoy in the occupied Copenhagen.; In 1941 he studied at Columbia University.; In 1943 he was Chief of Protocol in the Ministry of Foreign Affairs in Nanjing.; in 1964 he was ambassador in Kuwait City.	Yu Hung-Chun	Mohammad Reza Shah	January 1, 1964
January 1, 1964	Shen Yorkson Chin-ting	zh:沈觐鼎	From 1903 to 1921 he studied at the University of Tokyo.; In October 1934 he was ambassador in Panama City.; In 1941 he was employed in San José (Costa Rica) and Envoy in Tegucigalpa, San Salvador.; In 1942 he studied in the United States.; In 1950 he was ambassador in Havana and Rio de Janeiro.; From 1956 to 1959 he was ambassador in Tokyo.; In 1960 he was Ambassador in Kinshasa.	Yen Chia-kan	Mohammad Reza Shah	February 1, 1967
February 1, 1967	Liu Tsing-chang	刘荩章	(* 1920 in Sichuan): In 1942 graduated from the Central Political Institute .	Yen Chia-kan	Mohammad Reza Shah	October 1, 1970
October 1, 1970	Wu Shih-ying	吴世英	Woo Shih-ying, On November 22, 1960 The Executive Yuan approved the appointments of Woo Shih-ying as ambassador to Cameroon and Togo.; On March 19, 1972 he was appointed Consul-General in Boston, where he replaced Ouyang Huang	Yen Chia-kan	Mohammad Reza Shah	August 1, 1971
March 1, 1972	Chen Xinren	zh:陈辛仁	1954-1959: Ambassador in Helsinki.; 1975-1978: Ambassador in The Hague.; 1978-1981: Ambassador in Manila.	Zhou Enlai	Mohammad Reza Shah	November 1, 1974
December 1, 1974	Hao Deqing	zh:郝德青	1954-1961: Ambassador in Budapest.; 1961-1965: Ambassador in Pyongyang.; 1971-1972: Ambassador in Oslo.; 1972-1974: Ambassador in The Hague.	Zhou Enlai	Mohammad Reza Shah	January 1, 1977
May 1, 1977	Jiao Ruoyu	zh:焦若愚	1965-1970: Ambassador in Pyongyang.; 1971-1977: Ambassador in Lima.	Hua Guofeng	Mohammad Reza Shah	August 1, 1979
April 1, 1980	Zhuang Yan	zh:庄焰	1976-1979: Ambassador in Dhaka.; 1983-1985 Ambassador in Athens.	Zhao Ziyang	Abulhassan Banisadr	December 1, 1982
March 1, 1983	Fan Zuokai	zh:樊作楷	1970-1975: Ambassador in Mogadishu.; 1975-1978: Ambassador in Bamako.	Zhao Ziyang	Ali Khamenei	January 1, 1986
March 1, 1986	Wang Benzuo	zh:王本祚	1983-1985: Ambassador to Sofia	Zhao Ziyang	Ali Khamenei	June 1, 1991
March 1, 1991	Hua Liming	zh:华黎明	1996: Ambassador in Abu Dhabi	Li Peng	Akbar Hashemi Rafsanjani	October 1, 1995
August 1, 1995	Wang Shijie (PRC diplomat)	zh:王世杰 (中华人民共和国)	1990-1993: Ambassador in Manama.; 1993-1996: Ambassador in Amman.; 2002 April 2006: China's Special Envoy on the Middle East Issue.	Li Peng	Akbar Hashemi Rafsanjani	June 1, 1999
April 1, 1999	Sun Bigan	zh:孙必干	April 2006 – 2009: en: China's Special Envoy on the Middle East Issue	Zhu Rongji	Mohammad Khatami	October 1, 2002
June 1, 2002	Liu Zhentang	zh:刘振堂		Zhu Rongji	Mohammad Khatami	November 1, 2007
November 1, 2007	Xie Xiaoyan	zh:解晓岩		Wen Jiabao	Mahmoud Ahmadinejad	July 1, 2010
July 1, 2010	Yu Hongyang	zh:郁红阳		Wen Jiabao	Mahmoud Ahmadinejad	April 1, 2014
May 1, 2014	Pang Sen	庞森		Li Keqiang	Hassan Rohani	2019
July 2019	Chang Hua	常华		Li Keqiang	Hassan Rouhani	2024
May 2024	Cong Peiwu	丛培武		Li Qiang	Ebrahim Raisi	Present

== See also ==
- China-Iran relations
- Embassy of Iran, Beijing
- List of diplomatic missions of China
- List of diplomatic missions in Iran
