= Look to the East policy =

Foreign policy strategy of Iran

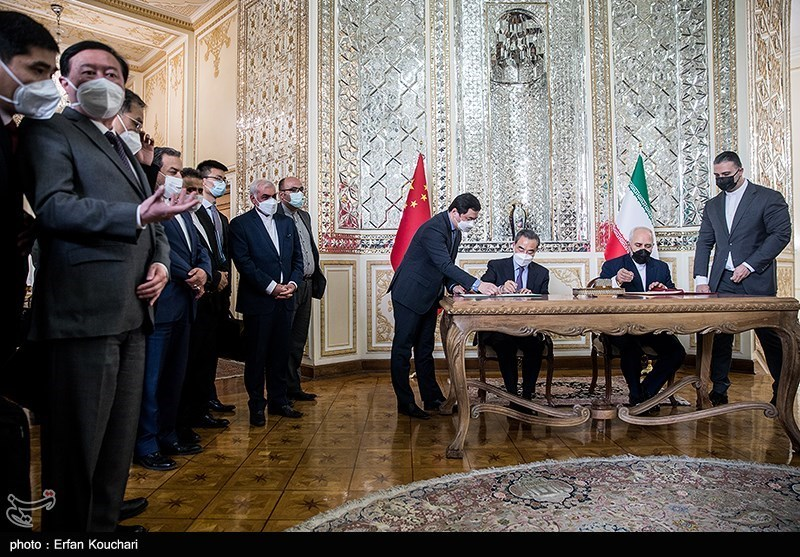
Iranian Foreign Minister Mohammad Javad Zarif and Chinese Foreign Minister Wang Yi signed the Iran–China 25-year Cooperation Program

Look to the East (Persian: نگاه به شرق, romanized: Negâh be sharq) is a foreign policy strategy in the Islamic Republic of Iran that has been proposed since Mahmoud Ahmadinejad's presidency in 2005. However, there is no consensus among experts as to which countries are among the goals of this policy, and from which point of view this policy should be viewed. There are at least three different views.

This policy falls within the theoretical framework of constructivism.

== Concept ==
The Look to the East policy evokes three states:

- development of relations with the East and the limitation of relations with the West;
- symmetric balance in relations with the East and the West;
- asymmetric balance in relations with the East and the West, with priority for the East.

The goals of Look to the East aligns itself most closely with the third clause, as it is based on avoiding Western-oriented unilateralism in foreign policy and a comprehensive view of foreign policy in order to take advantage and create opportunities. It is different from the first clause, and it has subtle differences with the second clause, as the policy is based on trying to communicate with the East and the West bilaterally, albeit prioritizing the East for geopolitical, cultural and economic needs. Therefore, this approach does not mean negation and indifference to the West; emphasis on the East in this case is not the negation of the West. In this regard, it can be inferred that Look to the East is a realistic strategy and—most importantly—seeks to use the opportunities of communication with different countries. In this regard, Ali Akbar Velayati, in describing the Look to the East policy, states: "Wherever our interests, desires and strategy are better and more met, it is natural that we give priority to it."

== Characteristics ==
In a situation where there is neither a clear reality called the "Eastern Bloc" nor the ideological claims of the East, Look to the East does not mean following the East and pure compliance with the Eastern countries, as was imagined during the Cold War. Therefore, the characteristics of this policy can be listed as follows:

- In balancing relations between East and West, Iran gives priority to the East, but does not negate the West, but is mainly opposed to an over-inclination to the West.
- It is based on creating advantage and opportunity. Therefore, it has flexibility and fluidity. In other words, it considers the field of relations with countries as wide.
- Nor is it contrary to the policy of "neither East nor West"; Because turning to the East does not mean accepting the domination of the East, and the East, is no longer like the former and has collapsed realistically and ideologically.

== History ==
Since the beginning of the Islamic Republic, Iran has made the slogan "neither East nor West" its motto and tried to take an independent step in its foreign policy. Until the end of the Cold War, Iran's absolutist approach to this slogan prevented Iran from finding strategic allies. The Look to the East policy came at a time when Iran's negotiations with European and Western countries over Iran's nuclear program were challenged and failed to serve national interests well; At the same time, the developments that have taken place in Asia in recent years have created new conditions.

One of the most important issues related to foreign policy after the ninth government came to power was the Look to the East policy and expanding Iran's relations with Asian countries. In fact, the failure to achieve the desired goals in relations with Western countries with the continuing hostility between Iran and the United States, especially in the nuclear case, led to the expansion of Iran's relations with the East to be considered and emphasized once again. This policy has so far been practically accompanied by a series of international movements and political stances.

Due to the issue of Iran's nuclear case, in which the three European countries, Britain, France and Germany, played a key role in the negotiations, and the emergence of a stalemate in this case by the mentioned countries, and that these three countries introduced themselves as representatives of the European Community or of the West in general, increased the tendency to find new horizons in the foreign policy of the Islamic Republic of Iran. Look to the East was in fact derived from the conditions mentioned. However, such a policy was not unprecedented in Iran and during the second term of Hashemi Rafsanjani's presidency, moves were made to strengthen existing ties with important Asian countries such as China, India and Russia within the framework of a strategic alliance.

Look to the East has been considered in the foreign policy of the Islamic Republic of Iran at different times, with strengths and weaknesses. However, in the recent years, this strategy has garnered more attention, as Supreme Leader Ali Khamenei emphasized on 18 February 2018, that "in foreign policy, the preference of the East over the West, the preference of the neighbor over the distant, the preference nations and countries that have something in common with us over others is one of our priorities today." In this regard, Ali Akbar Velayati, the International Advisor to the Supreme Leader of Iran, also considers this policy as a strategic necessity for the Islamic Republic in order to secure its economic, political and defense interests.

The policy focused on securance of the country's equipment needs from countries such as China, Russia, and North Korea. Given the success of cooperation with the countries of the Eastern sphere, the policy as a special strategy used by Iranian presidents Akbar Hashemi Rafsanjani, Mohammad Khatami, Mahmoud Ahmadinejad, and Hassan Rouhani. Among the mentioned governments, during Ahmadinejad's presidency, due to the unprecedented pressure of the West on the Islamic Republic of Iran under political pretexts, this idea took over the country's diplomatic apparatus, which is the key to solving fundamental problems in foreign policy not located in European capitals but in East Asia. According to this, Ahmadinejad, while reforming the approaches and policies of the previous government (Khatami), which was based on establishing and deepening relations with the West and specifically Europe, made special efforts to establish relations with the Eastern world.

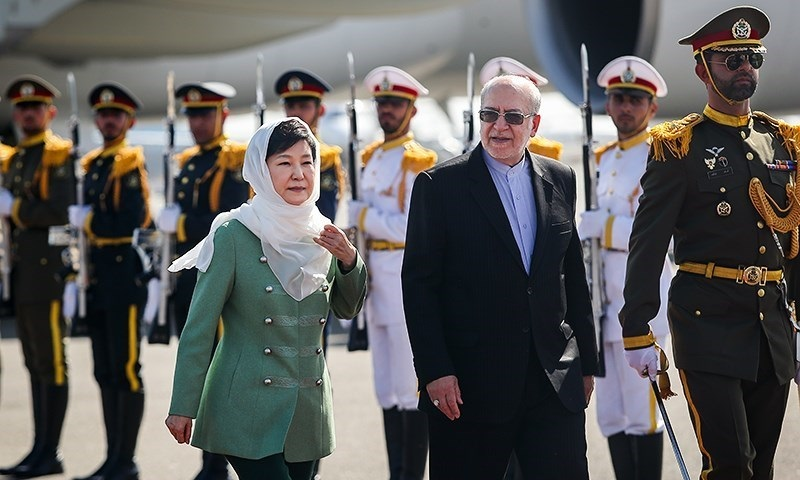
South Korean President Park Geun-hye being welcomed by Iran's business minister, Mohammad Reza Nematzadeh in Mehrabad Airport

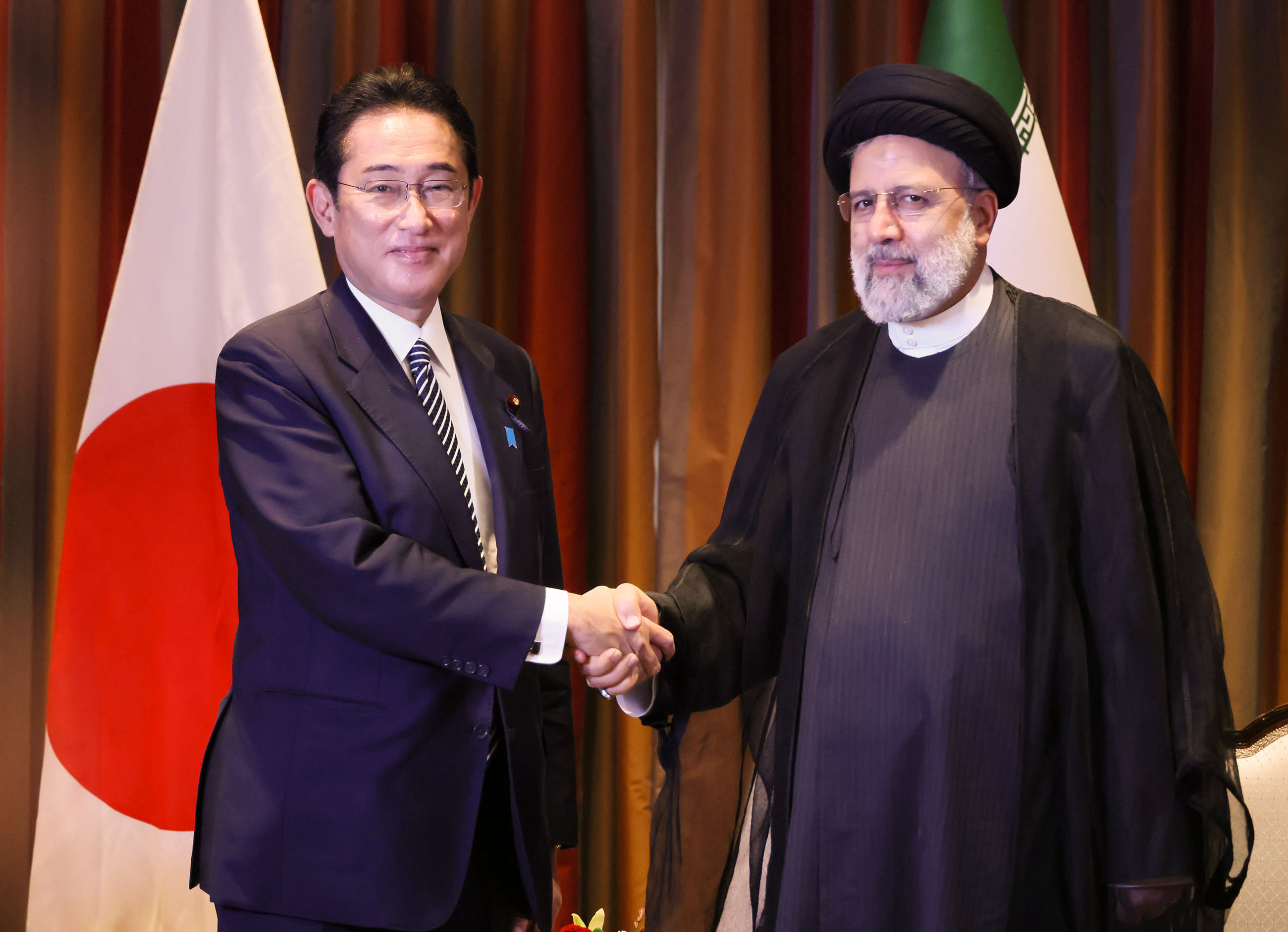
Japanese Prime Minister Fumio Kishida and Iranian President Ebrahim Raisi

After the end of the government of Mahmoud Ahmadinejad in 2013, the eleventh government led by Hassan Rouhani, although made special efforts to solve the previous problems and subsequently improve relations with the West through the so-called "Joint Comprehensive Plan of Action (JCPOA, BARJAM)" agreement, but Rouhani did not overlooked from East Asia, and specifically the Indo-Pacific strategic area. Because he knew that given the specific geopolitical and geostrategic situations, these regions would be able to influence the order of the world power pyramid in the coming years. This is the reason why Rouhani's government set up the Iran–China 25-year Cooperation Program as a rising power in politics and international relations.

Look to the East has been seen as an escape rather than an opportunity to turn to in times of trouble with the West. In other words, it can be said that the strategy of Look to the East in the field of foreign policy of the Islamic Republic of Iran has been more affected by the challenge to the West as a codified policy.

== Target countries ==
Countries such as Japan, South Korea, China, Malaysia, Russia, India and Pakistan have been targeted in this policy. Of course, according to some, since Japan and South Korea, by adopting the economic policies of liberal capitalism and cultural dissolution in Western civilization, are no longer defined in the context of Oriental civilization, they can no longer have a place in this policy, and the Look to the East policy is based on the four pillars of Russia, India, China and Malaysia.

== Approaches ==
Geographical-ideological

Based on this type of view, the definition of the Eastern sphere is based on geographical location and to some extent the confrontation with the Western world.According to this view, Latin American countries are also defined in the Eastern sphere. This approach has been the basis of decision-making in Ahmadinejad's government.

Ideological

With the ideological view, which is based on the bipolar east–west confrontation and the Islamist view of the Islamic Republic, the countries of the Islamic world are also defined in the Eastern sphere. This view has few fans.

Pragmatic

This view of the East is based on the Eastern civilization and with a regional and neighborhood perspective and tries to provide a spatial and geographical identity from the East.

== Criticism ==
Fereydoon Majlesi, former Iranian diplomat, believes that the Look to the East policy not only does not lead to Iran's progress and exit from the current situation, but also traps the country in a non-competitive market and causes uneconomic and harmful trade interactions. According to him, the strategy of Look to the East does not make sense for Iran. With this policy, Iran becomes captive to its inability with the East and remains trapped in this market. Therefore, if they give any goods at any price, Iran will have to buy. While Iran should be free in its relations and become a customer of any market that offers better goods at a more competitive price. According to him, the strategy of Look to the East causes Iranian to pay a lot of financial ransom to the countries of the East for playing as broker in the world market. According to him, in general, the Look to the East policy results in a harmful economy for Iran.

Qaem Mousavi, An Iranian political science expert has said, in regards to Look to the East, that "Iran has tended to China and Russia because of the influence of the West and the pressures of the United States, but China and Russia have not responded positively to our country despite the apparent-verbal declaration. They did not support us in major crises and troubles. China and Russia deprive us of what was necessary and left us empty-handed." According to him, Russia benefits are served from Iran's troubles with the West and therefore Russia encourages the continuation of this dispute in order to secure its interests. Russia, meanwhile, has not provided adequate support where needed. According to him, Iran is forced to ignore China's bad treatment with its Muslims in the face of the US and Western pressure. According to him, Iran should avoid dependence on Russia and China, because they are not reliable and stable allies and will no doubt not provide the necessary support to Iran in sensitive areas.
