= Miwnay =

Miwnay was a 4th-century Sogdian woman, who has been abandoned and left destitute in Dunhuang, China, by her husband Nanai-dhat. Miwnay is known from Sogdian Ancient Letters (I and III).

In the Ancient Letter No. 1, Miwnay writes to her mother, Chatis, and explains her and her child's (Shayn) situation. She says she has tried to find someone to take her to her mother's house, but nobody is willing to help, so “I depend on charity from the Zoroastrian priest.”

The Ancient Letter No. 3 is addressed to her husband, Nanai-dhat. She complains to him how he never answers her letters or sends money. “I obeyed your command and came to Dunhuang and did not observe my mother's bidding nor that of my brothers. Surely the gods were angry with me on the day when I did your bidding!” At the end of the letter, Miwnay says “I would rather be a dog’s or a pig’s wife than yours!”
