= Iran–China 25-year Cooperation Program =

Bilateral cooperation agreement signed in 2021

China–Iran Comprehensive Strategic Partnership
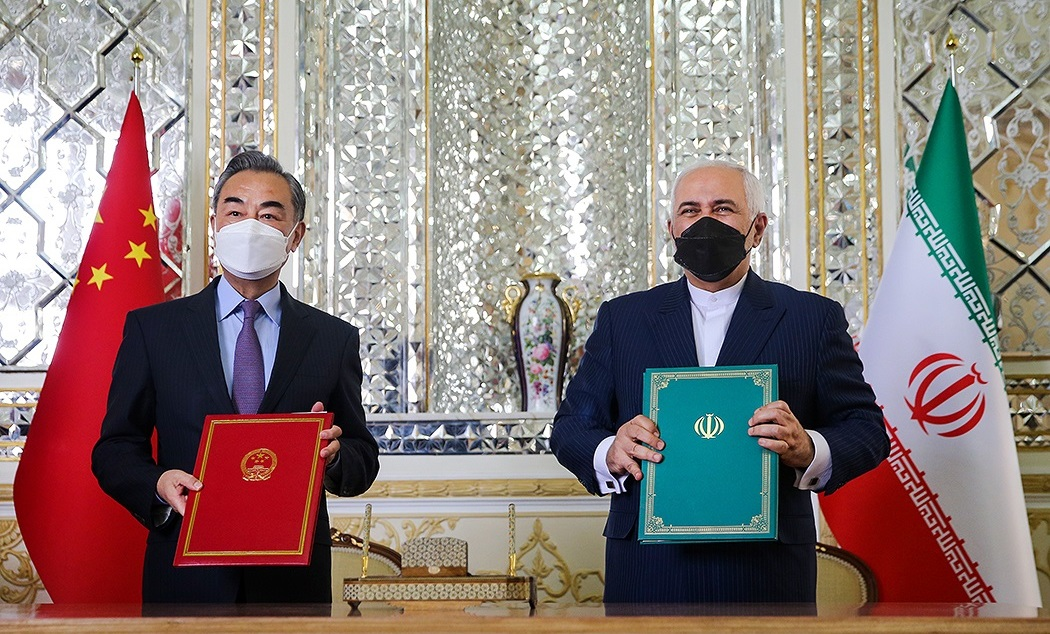
- Chinese foreign minister Wang Yi (left) and Iranian foreign minister Mohammad Javad Zarif (right) after signing off on the cooperation program in Tehran
- Created: 27 March 2021
- Location: Tehran, Iran
- Signatories: People's Republic of China; Islamic Republic of Iran
- Purpose: Agreement in all areas of bilateral relations and regional and international issues

The Iran–China 25-year Cooperation Program or Comprehensive Strategic Partnership between I.R. Iran, P.R. China is a 25-year cooperation agreement on the further development of Iran–China relations signed in Tehran by the Chinese and Iranian foreign ministers on 27 March 2021; the final details of the agreement have yet to be officially announced. Under a draft of the 25-year agreement (signed on 24 June 2020 in Beijing) previously obtained by The New York Times, China is to invest US$400 billion in Iran's economy over that time period in exchange for a steady and heavily discounted supply of oil from Iran. The key details of the deal were originally reported by British journalist and author, Simon Watkins, in an article published on 3 September 2019 in Petroleum Economist stating that the agreement includes up to $280 billion towards developing Iran's oil, gas and petrochemicals sectors and another investment of $120 billion towards upgrading Iran's transportation and manufacturing infrastructure. According to Iranian authorities, reviving the Chinese One Belt One Road Initiative is also part of the agreement.

The report by Petroleum Economist stated that, according to the agreement, "China will be able to buy any and all Iranian oil, gas and petrochemical products at a minimum guaranteed discount of 12pc to the six-month rolling mean price of comparable benchmark products, plus another 6pc to 8pc of that metric for risk-adjusted compensation." The same report added that the agreement would allow China to deploy security personnel on the ground in Iran to protect Chinese projects, and that there would be additional personnel and materiel available to protect the eventual transit of oil, gas, and petrochemicals supplies from Iran to China, where necessary, including through the Persian Gulf.

Later reports in other publications added that the deal included the leasing of Iranian islands to China were categorically denied by Iranian authorities, including by the Iranian foreign minister Mohammad Javad Zarif, who stated "such a deal doesn't even exist, let alone have articles", and that "we have not handed over a [single square] meter of [our] land to China or any other country, nor granted any foreign country the exclusive right to take advantage of a handspan of Iran’s soil, and will not do this [in the future]”. Later on, the spokesman for the Iranian foreign ministry confirmed to reporters that "there is no handing over of the Iranian islands, no presence of military forces and no other illusions". Reports regarding heavily discounted Iranian oil and petrochemical sales were also denied.

Based on the agreement, China has agreed to inject $300-$400 billion by foreign direct investment into the Iranian oil, gas and petrochemical industries.

The original plan for cooperation had been proposed by General Secretary of the Chinese Communist Party Xi Jinping during a 2016 visit to Iran. Iranian president Hassan Rouhani signed the final draft of the program on June 23 in a cabinet meeting and ordered the Iranian foreign ministry to finalize the negotiations. As of July 2020, Iran's parliament has yet to pass the deal but will likely follow suit. On 1 October 2020 President Rouhani sent a message to Xi Jinping about signing off on the program.

== Background ==
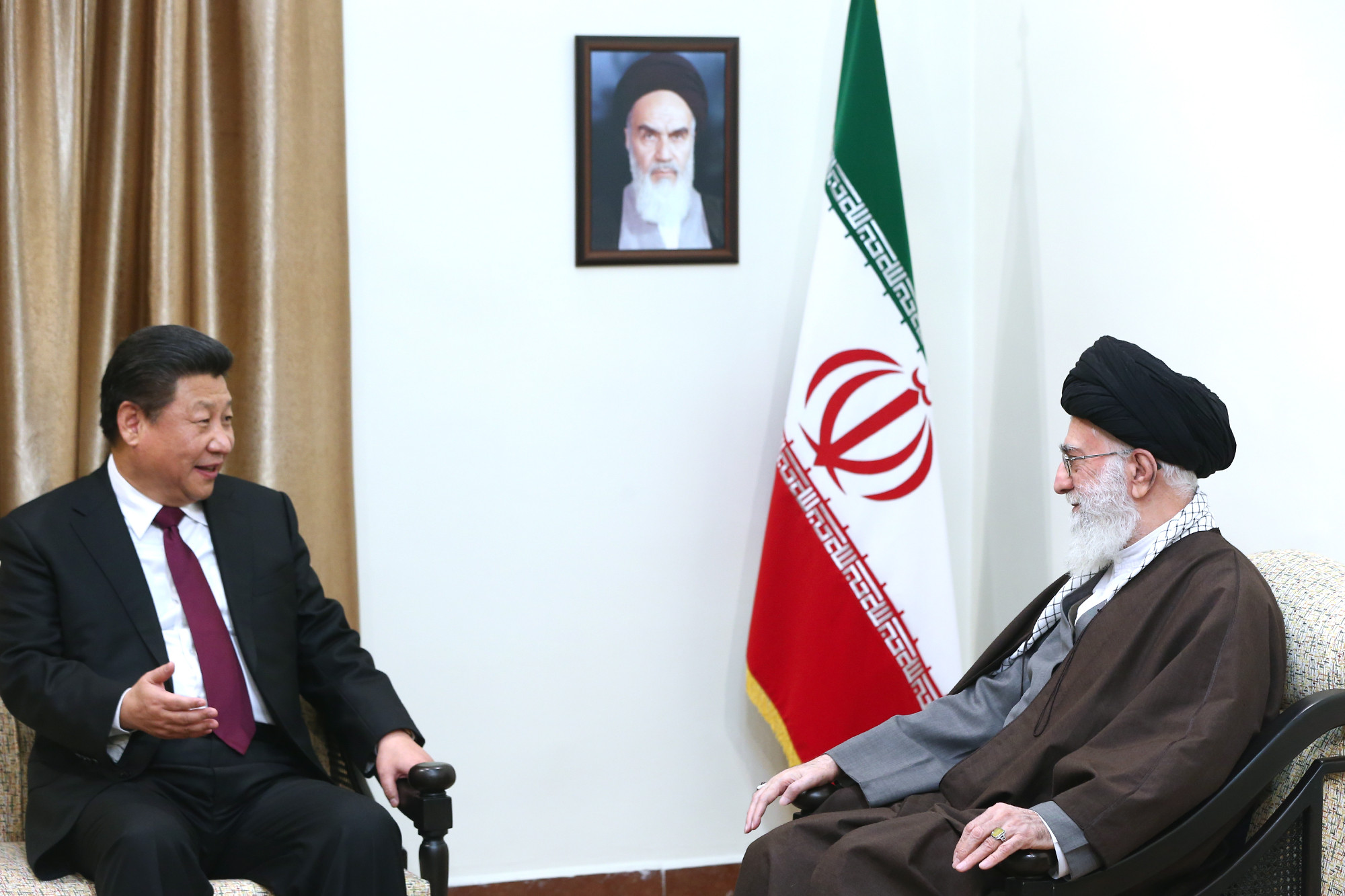
Supreme Leader Ali Khamenei receives Chinese leader Xi Jinping in Beit-e Rahbari, Tehran (2016)

The Republic of China and Iran officially established diplomatic relations in 1937. In 1971, Iran recognized the People's Republic of China (ruled by the Chinese Communist Party) as the sole legitimate government of China, and likewise rescinded its recognition of the Republic of China (with its Kuomintang government now based in Taiwan) as a state. In the early years of the Cold War, Iran and the People's Republic of China were on opposing sides of the Iron Curtain, with Iran being a part of the American-led Western Bloc from the 1953 coup and China being a part of the Soviet-led Eastern Bloc until the latter broke away in 1961, thus siding with the Western Bloc until the end of the Cold War.

Following the 1979 Iranian Revolution, which established the present-day Islamic Republic of Iran, the two states maintained their diplomatic relationship as Iran and the United States severed their bilateral ties during the Iran–U.S. hostage crisis. Iran was eventually put under international sanctions, although China still provided aid in the form of armaments to the Iranians during the Iran–Iraq War.

The Shanghai Cooperation Organization, on which Iran is an observer state, and the 25-year Iran–China program are both part of the Chinese Belt and Road Initiative, so it is likely that Iran's request for permanent membership will be repeated in the near future and will be accepted by all its members.

== Draft ==
“This cooperation is a ground for Iran and China’s participation in basic projects and development of infrastructure, including the large 'Belt and Road' initiative, and an opportunity to attract investment in various economic fields, including industry, tourism, information technology and communication,” the presidential website quoted Rouhani as saying. Ali Larijani is responsible for pursuing the program, according to Mahmoud Vaezi.

=== South Asia geo-economics effect ===
Iran has a similar project partnership with India and Russia, called International North–South Transport Corridor. There are also prospective developments in including Pakistan. Both Iran and Pakistan have had friendly relations with China in the past. The Belt and Road Initiative's benefits have the potential to outweigh the political and religious differences. Freer trade between Iran and Pakistan due to railways and ports could open up potential development in both countries. There would also be a stronger, unified front to pressure Afghanistan to follow suit. This potential agreement would also relieve India's pressure on Pakistan and China.

=== National Internet ===
A member of Iranian Islamic Consultative Assembly said in June 2020 that in the draft document "cooperation in the development of cyberspace" has been listed and noted that using National Information Network offensive sites and databases can be filtered.

=== Chinese military presence ===
According to the Petroleum Economist report of September 2019, the investment comes with a huge discount on oil, gas and petrochemical purchases, prioritizing China in implementing development projects and allowing 5,000 Chinese (foreign) security forces to be present on Iranian soil. There is also talk of deepening military cooperation, according to The New York Times. The draft includes joint military exercises and training, research and weapons development, and intelligence sharing. The reason being to stop terrorism, trafficking in persons and drugs, and cross-border crimes. Those reports were categorically denied by Iranian authorities on numerous occasions. Article 146 of the Iranian constitution forbids the presence of foreign military bases on Iranian soil, even for peaceful purposes.

=== Effect on the Middle East ===
China's long term policy on non-political intervention has served it well in the pursuit of economic development. China has become economically involved with many nations in the Middle East and the BRI will likely include many of those already involved with China. Making such a deal with Iran is a contentious move and the effects are unclear. The Times article describes the move as conflicting with other regional players interests, primarily Saudi Arabia. Time however, explains that it is no different than any of the other economic deals within the BRI that include other nations like other Persian Gulf states and Egypt. China's increasing support for nations that are in conflict with one another may begin to work against it, like its support of Palestine and Israel. Though this may pale in comparison to the economic progress made through the BRI for the Middle East as a whole. Declining relations with the West and China's hands off policy in domestic matters of trade partners, makes China an appealing candidate for economic future of many states in the Middle East. The deal with Iran may be the model under which other nations begin to follow.

=== U.S. relations ===
Despite the escalations in tensions between the US, Iran and China, due to President Joe Biden's administration, the Cooperation Plan is not in response to US actions. The deal had been in development since 2016, before the Trump administration left the Iran deal and prior to the changes in Chinese-U.S. trade relations. However, the U.S. has had a hand in pushing the two nations together in the past. Its policies in the past have inadvertently pressured the two to work together due to nuclear nonproliferation and economic sanctions. China is often extending an economic lifeline to Iran due to U.S. sanctions. Saied Khatibzadeh, spokesperson for Iran's Foreign Ministry denies that progress in the deal has been delayed till after the US 2020 election. As of October 19, 2020 the US has sanctioned six entities and two individuals for their activities involved with the Islamic Republic of Iran Shipping Lines (IRISL).

== See also ==
- D'Arcy Concession
- Treaty of Turkmenchay
- China–Iran relations
- Joint Comprehensive Plan of Action
- Foreign policy of Xi Jinping
- Economy of China
- Economy of Iran
- Anglo-Persian Agreement known in Iran as the Contract of 1919
