= Iran LNG =

General information
- Type: LNG plant
- Location: Tombak Port, Iran
- Construction started: 2007
- Estimated completion: 2011

Design and construction
- Engineer: Farab, Namvaran, and APS Engineering
- Other designers: Linde, Hyundai, and Snamprogetti

Website
- Iran LNG

Iran LNG, also known as NIOC LNG, is a LNG plant under development at Tombak Port, approximately 50 kilometres (31 mi) north of Assaluyeh Port and 15 kilometres (9.3 mi) southeast of Kangan, Iran.

== History ==
Construction of the LNG plant started in 2007. In April 2007, Austrian oil company OMV signed a preliminary agreement to participate in the project; however, the final agreement is not signed.

== Technical description ==
The project includes two LNG trains each with capacity of 5.4 million tons of LNG per annum. The trains will use the Linde Liquefaction Process.

The Iran LNG project consists of the LNG plant, including storage and loading facilities and following units:

- Liquefaction Units
- Treating Units
- Power Station, Electric Motors and Compressors
- Utilities and Off-Sites
- Telecommunication
- LNG Storage Tanks, which includes LNG and LPG Tanks
- Harbour and Jetties

It will be supplies from the phase 12 of the South Pars gas field.

The LNG plant is expected to come online in 2011.

== Contractors ==
The LNG plant is designed by consortium of Linde, Hyundai, and Snamprogetti. The engineering consortium for gas sweetening operations comprises Iranian companies Farab and Namvaran, and an Italian company APS Engineering. The LNG trains will be built by two consortia including the consortium of Iranian Farab and Chinese HuaFu Engineering Company, and the consortium led by the Pars International Development & Engineering Company. The liquefying equipment would be distributed by Steiner-Prematechnik-Gastec. Storage tanks for LNG are built by Daelim Industrial. Power plant and electro-compressor sections would be built by the Iran Power Plant Projects Management Co. Iran's Rah Sahel will construct the jetty, and the off-site and utility segments will be handled by Iran's Petro Sanat Maad.

== Company ==
The project is developed by the Iran LNG company, a subsidiary of the Iranian Gas exporting company (IGEC), which holds 49% of the shares, with the rest shared by the Oil Industry Investment Company (OIIC) (50%) and Oil Industry Pension Fund (1%). The shares of the two later is planned to reduce to 11%, and the remained 40% will be provided to strategic partners. The managing director of the company is Ali caiwanara.

== See also ==
- North Pars Gas Field
