= List of ambassadors of China to Zimbabwe =

Coordinates: 17.767858°S 31.033487°E

Chinese Ambassador to Zimbabwe
- National emblem of China
- Inaugural holder: Chu Qiyuan
- Formation: 1 June 1980; 46 years ago

The Chinese ambassador to Zimbabwe is the official representative of the People's Republic of China to the Republic of Zimbabwe.

== List of ambassadors ==
Diplomatic agrément/Diplomatic accreditation	Ambassador	Chinese language zh:中国驻津巴布韦大使列表	Observations	Premier of the People's Republic of China	List of presidents of Zimbabwe	Term end
18 April 1980			On independence of Zimbabwe the governments in Harare and Beijing established diplomatic relations.	Zhao Ziyang	Canaan Banana	
1 June 1980	Chu Qiyuan	zh:褚启元		Zhao Ziyang	Canaan Banana	1 December 1984
1 April 1985	Zheng Yaowen	zh:郑耀文	From April 1985 - May 1988 he was ambassador in Harare.; From November 1991 - August 1995 he was Chinese Ambassador to Denmark and Iceland.	Zhao Ziyang	Canaan Banana	1 May 1988
1 July 1988	Song Guoqing	zh:宋国清	From July 1988 - July 1991 he was ambassador in Harare.; From February 1994 - February 1998 he was Chinese Ambassador to Spain and Andorra.	Li Peng	Robert Mugabe	1 July 1991
1 November 1991	Gu Xin'er	zh:顾欣尔	From October 1985 to January 1989 he was Chinese Ambassador to Ghana.; From November 1991 to November 1995 he was ambassador in Harare.	Li Peng	Robert Mugabe	1 November 1995
1 December 1995	Liu Guijin	zh:刘贵今	(* August 1945 -): From December 1995 - January 1998 he was ambassador in Harare.; From March 2001 - April 2007 he was Chinese Ambassador to South Africa.	Li Peng	Robert Mugabe	1 January 1998
1 April 1998	Huang Guifang	zh:黄桂芳	(September 1939 -): From October 1991 to April 1995 he was Chinese Ambassador to the Philippines.; From May 1995 to January 1998 he was Chinese Ambassador to New Zealand.; From January 1998 to May 2000 he was ambassador in Harare.	Zhu Rongji	Robert Mugabe	1 May 2000
1 June 2000	Hou Qingru	zh:侯清儒	From December 1993 to August 1998 he was Chinese Ambassador to Fiji.; From June 2000 to July 2003 he was ambassador in Harare.	Zhu Rongji	Robert Mugabe	1 July 2003
1 September 2003	Zhang Xianyi	zh:张宪一	From July 2000 to June 2003 he was Chinese Ambassador to Lesotho.; From September 2003 to December 2006 he was ambassador in Harare.; From March 2009 to February 2012 he was Chinese Ambassador to Bangladesh.; From March 2012 to March 2015 he was Chinese Ambassador to Slovenia.	Wen Jiabao	Robert Mugabe	1 December 2006
1 December 2006	Yuan Nansheng	zh:袁南生	(*March 1954 -): From December 2006 to July 2009 he was ambassador in Harare.; From August 2009 to February 2013 he was Chinese Ambassador to Suriname.	Wen Jiabao	Robert Mugabe	1 July 2009
1 August 2009	Xin Shunkang	zh:忻顺康	From Julio 2012 - Diciembre 2016 he was Chinese Ambassador to Namibia.; From Diciembre 2006 - Julio 2009 he was ambassador in Harare.	Wen Jiabao	Robert Mugabe	1 June 2012
1 July 2012	Lin Lin (PRC diplomat)	zh:林琳	From September 2004 to May 2008 he was Chinese Ambassador to Ethiopia.; From July 2012 to October 2015 he was ambassador in Harare.; Since December 2015 he is Chinese Ambassador to the Slovakia.	Wen Jiabao	Robert Mugabe	1 October 2015
1 October 2015	Huang Ping	黃屏		Li Keqiang	Robert Mugabe	11 March 2023

== See also ==
- China–Zimbabwe relations
