= All-China Journalists Association =

United front organization

- 中华全国新闻工作者协会
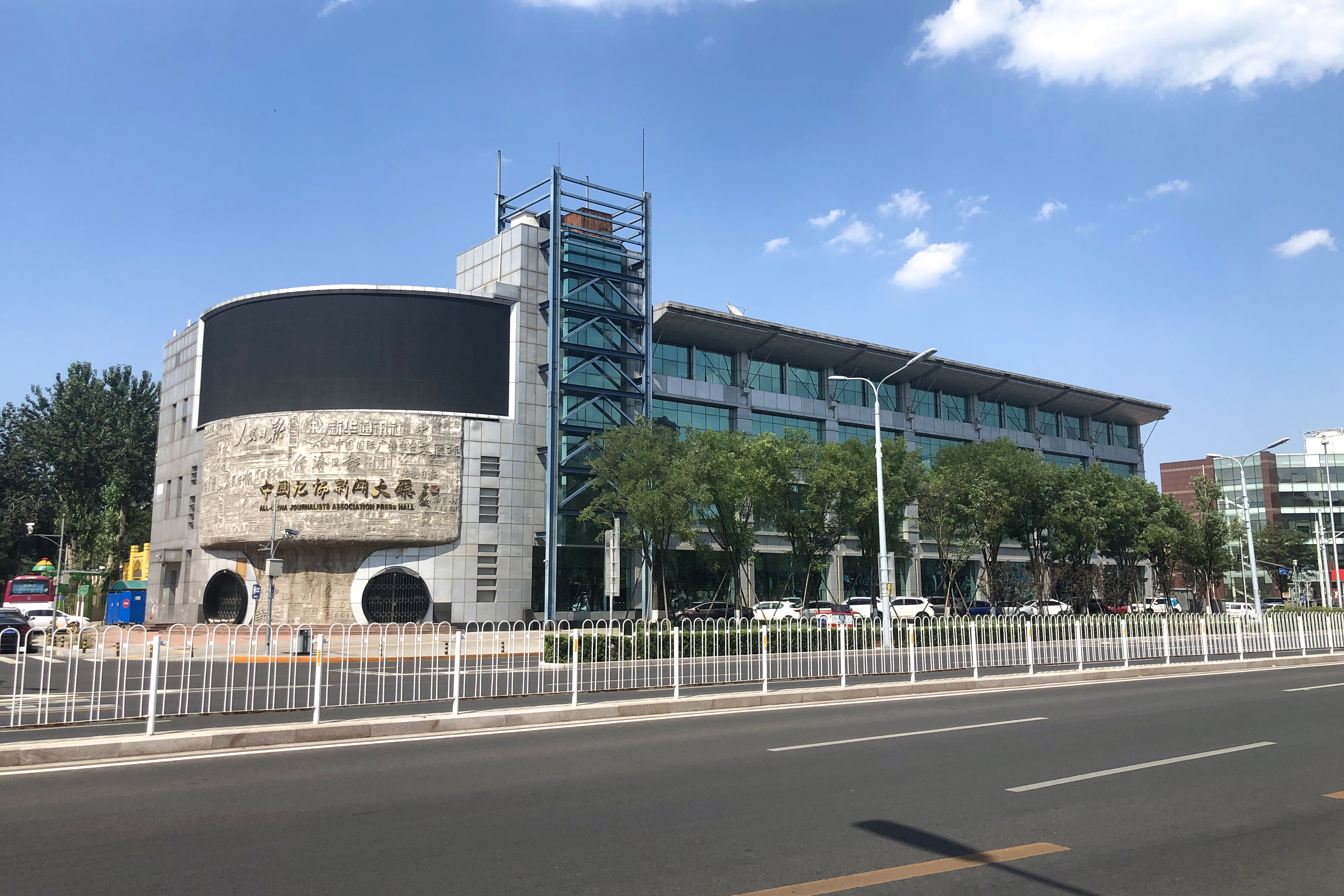
- Headquarters of the ACJA
- Formation: November 8, 1937
- Type: People's organization
- Headquarters: 7 Zhushikou East Street, Dongcheng, Beijing
- President: He Ping
- Party Secretary: Liu Siyang
- Website: www.zgjx.cn

All-China Journalists Association
- Simplified Chinese: 中华全国新闻工作者协会
- Traditional Chinese: 中華全國新聞工作者協會
Transcriptions
Standard Mandarin
- Hanyu Pinyin: Zhōnghuá Quánguó Xīnwén Gōngzuòzhě Xiéhuì

Abbreviation
- Simplified Chinese: 中国记协
- Traditional Chinese: 中國記協
Transcriptions
Standard Mandarin
- Hanyu Pinyin: Zhōngguó Jìxié

The All-China Journalists Association (ACJA), previously known as the 'Chinese Young Journalist Association', is a people's organization established in Shanghai on November 8, 1937. November 8 now marks 'National Journalists Day' in China. The society was established by Chinese wartime reporter Fan Changjiang and later organized and sponsored by the Chinese Communist Party (CCP). On September 15, 1949, the All China Journalist Association became the first Chinese media association to be formally recognized by, and integrated into, the International Federation of Journalists.

Membership in the association is required for all professional journalists in China as overseen by the Propaganda Department of the Chinese Communist Party. There are over 217 rural and industrial member organizations in the association, encompassing over 1 million individuals in the media industry in China. The All-China Journalists Association is also a member of the Belt and Road News Network, assisting in the network's establishment in 2017.

== History ==
=== Founding members ===
==== Fan Changjiang ====
Fan Changjiang's career in journalism gained domestic notoriety in China during the Sino-Japanese war, attributed to his work as a war correspondent in regional China. During this period, he made observations of poverty in rural China in his book 'The Northwest Corner of China' (Zhongguo de Xibei Jiao), espousing his melancholy to see "bare-footed children…bound-footed women…plodding along" on the "Refugee Trail".

Fan Changjiang promoted engagement with, and development of, the journalistic profession in rural communities to increase the visibility of minority groups and their diverse experiences during the war and under the existing government. Changjiang became disillusioned with the Nationalist government during the Sino-Japanese war attributed to their perceived disregard for rural communities, and later aligned himself with the CCP.

The Chinese journalist strongly advocated for transforming media practices in China, esteeming objective, factual reporting compared to commentarial pieces in inaccessible language created by his predecessors. Fan Changjiang launched the All-China Journalist Association to manifest this ideological shift, creating an organization where techniques, styles and good reporting practices could be monitored and imparted upon reporters from localities across China and amongst China's various ethnic groups.

Fan Changjiang also participated in opening the 'Reporters Hostel' to create a physical location where reporters could collectively gather and share practices and develop ideas. In honor of Fan Changjiang's contribution to the development of journalism and reporting in China, the All-China Journalist Association established the 'Fan Changjiang Journalist Award', the most prestigious journalist award in the nation.

Shao Huaze (born 1933), member of the dominant Han Chinese ethnic group, of the People's Liberation Army since 1950, of the CCP since 1957, director of the People's Daily since 1989, was honorary president. Zhang Yannong (born 1948), president of the People's Daily since 2008, had been president of ACJA in the early 2020s. Liu Zhengrong, member of the Chinese Communist party, Deputy Chief of Internet Affairs at the Bureau of the State Council Information Office, and vice-president of Xinhua News Agency, had been Executive Secretary for the All-China Journalists Association.

== Structure ==
=== Executive Appointment Process ===
Board members of the All-China Journalist Association are appointed every five years and are typically high-ranking members of Chinese media institutions, domestically renowned reporters, notable public figures, and well-regarded editors.

=== Governance ===
As of January 2025:

- President: He Ping
- Executive Vice-President: Liu Siyang
- Vice-presidents: Yan Xiaoming, Wang Yibiao, Liu Zhengrong, Yang Xiaowei, Wang Leiming, Zhang Yutang, Zhao Jingyun, Chen Songqing, Huang Changkai, Zhang Chunjiao, Li Xiaojun, Liu Chengan
- Executive Secretaries: Tian Yuhong, Wu Jing, Wu Xu, Yin Lujun, Su Rongcai

=== Departments ===
==== Domestic Work Department ====
The Domestic Work Department works with communities to understand domestic rhetoric and sentiment. Journalists are able to produce authentic localized pieces within the guidelines of the Chinese Communist Party Department of Propaganda.

==== International Liaison Department ====
The International Liaison Department of the Chinese Communist Party works to establish connections and communications with foreign media organizations. This outreach program enables Chinese perspectives to be represented in international media as well as Chinese journalists to participate in the international community of journalists.

==== Taiwan, Hong Kong, and Macao Affairs Department ====
The Taiwan, Hong Kong and Macao Affairs Department works with media organizations in these locations in an attempt to improve diplomatic communications and share media practice and ideology.

==== The General Office and Journalism Training Centre ====
The General Office and Journalism Training Centre collaborates with the Chinese Communist Party, Journalism schools and university departments to connect journalists and organizations with students, as well as to spread methods and techniques associated with journalism. This department works in adherence to the 2013 ‘Joint Model’ of cooperation and collaboration between the Propaganda Department of the Central Committee and Chinese universities, so as to ensure the spread of CCP ideals and desired media output.

== Members ==
=== Industrial Partner Organizations ===
==== China Photography Association ====
Established in 1956, the Chinese Photography Association, renamed the Photojournalist Society of China in 1983, aims to provide a platform for photographers to express their interpretation of life in China through visual media focused on both natural landscapes and human stories. The association joined the All-China Journalist association upon its inception and was founded by the former head of the Xinhua News Photography Department, Shi Shaohua, who became the chairman of the new association. The photographer's association aimed to create photographic exhibitions, national and internationally recognized magazines and establish awards to recognize talented Chinese photographers.

==== Other Industrial Partners ====
The following list is current as of January 2021.

- Chinese Automotive Journalists Association
- China City-Level Newspaper Society
- China Country-Level Newspaper Society
- China Digest News Society
- China Petroleum Journalists Association
- China Evening News Journalists Association
- Chinese News Cartoon Society
- Chinese Newspaper Supplements Society
- Chinese Posts and Telecommunications Journalist Association

=== Provincial Member Organizations ===
- Anhui Journalists Association
- Chongqing Journalists Association
- Fujian Journalists Association
- Gansu Journalists Association
- Guangdong Journalists Association
- Guangxi Zhuang Autonomous Region Journalists Association
- Guizhou Journalists Association
- Hainan Journalists Association
- Hebei Journalists Association
- Heilongjiang Journalists Association
- Henan Journalists Association
- Hubei Journalists Association
- Hunan Journalists Association
- Inner Mongolia Autonomous Region Journalists Association
- Jiangsu Journalists Association
- Jiangxi Journalists Association
- Jilin Journalist Association
- Liaoning Journalists Association
- Ningxia Hui Autonomous Region Journalists Association
- Qinghai Journalists Association
- Shaanxi Journalists Association
- Shandong Journalists Association
- Shanghai Journalists Association
- Shanxi Journalists Association
- Sichuan Journalists Association
- Tianjin Journalists Association
- Tibet Autonomous Region Journalists Association
- Xinjiang Production and Construction Corps Journalist Association
- Xinjiang Uygur Autonomous Region Journalists Association
- Yunnan Journalists Association
- Zhejiang Journalists Association

== Awards and Accolades ==
=== Fan Changjiang Award ===
The Fan Changjiang Award is awarded to reporters, and is regarded as one of the two most recognized journalism awards in China.

=== Taofen Award ===
The Taofen Award, named after Zou Taofen is dedicated to journalistic editors for 'outstanding' contribution.

== International Interactions ==
=== Belt and Road ===
==== Project summary ====
The Belt and Road Project is a physical manifestation of China's expansionary foreign policy under leadership of Xi Jinping. The initiative was launched in Kazakhstan at Nazarbayev University and in Indonesia in late 2013. The Belt and Road Initiative is of significance internationally attributed to China's inextricable and transnational economic integration, predominantly through its role in manufacturing but expanding into other industries such as technology.

The Belt and Road Project has three predominant aspects: Overland, Technological, and Maritime. The Overland aspect includes coherent development of routes passing through Russia, Mongolia, the Middle East, Central Asia, Turkey and ending at Europe. The initiative's Maritime manifestation includes control and ability to facilitate trade and movements through the South China Sea, Indian Ocean and towards the Middle East and Europe. Technologically, China has developed satellites, fiber-optic cables, communication networks, and has promoted the expansion of Chinese mobile companies to integrate the international community and China more deeply. The Chinese government has launched initiatives to these effects, such as developing railways in the south-east Asian region. China has also worked to influence nations through crafting aid agreements, bilateral trading agreements and establishing free trade with participating and cooperative nations.

==== All-China Journalists Association and Belt and Road ====
The All-China Journalists Association regularly cooperates with the Chinese government and member organizations and journalists to produce content that updates about and promotes the Belt and Road Project. This is exemplified through articles published by the organization in cooperation with oligarchical Chinese news agencies such as Xinhuanet and China Daily. A report on May 5, 2020, from the organization in collaboration with China Daily alludes to Russian collaboration through the assertion "we are all in a community of common destiny."

In 2018, the All-China Journalists Association assembled the BRI Journalists Forum, which included approximately 100 representatives from 47 developing countries.

==== The Belt and Road Journalists Network ====
The Belt and Road Initiative has also enabled the All-China Journalist Society, in collaboration with other members of the Belt and Road Project to create a 'Belt and Road Journalists Network'. The Belt and Road News Network, launched in 2017, encompasses 208 media organizations from over 98 different nations. The Chair of the organization is China's People's Daily in collaboration with the All-China Journalists Association with the Secretariat located at 'People's Daily' in Beijing, China. The first council meeting was held in 2019, in Beijing, China, with over 40 international media organizations present.

This collaboration encompasses multiple media forms, including music, photography and news. Belt and Road News Network activities include collaborative media trips, shared access to news and media archives and databases, collective workshops and training seminars, as well as awards. In September 2019, the Belt and Road News Network held a media workshop in China; over 47 countries were represented and over 100 senior correspondents and senior editors were present.
