= Han Zhiqiang =

Chinese diplomat

- 韩志强
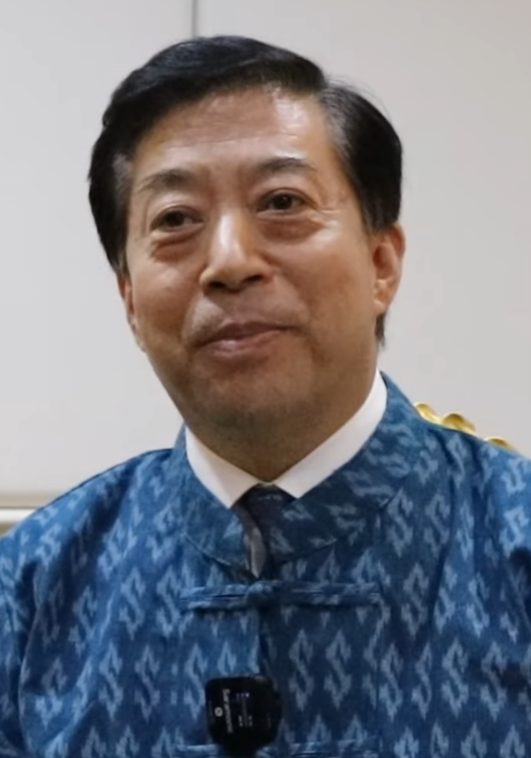
- Han in 2023

Chinese Ambassador to Thailand
- In office 10 August 2021 – 2025
- Preceded by: Lü Jian
- Succeeded by: Zhang Jianwei

Chinese Ambassador to Fiji
- In office October 2008 – June 2011
- Preceded by: Cai Jinbiao
- Succeeded by: Huang Yong

Personal details
- Born: November 1963 (age 62) Yitong Manchu Autonomous County, Jilin, China
- Party: Chinese Communist Party
- Education: Jilin University

Chinese name
- Simplified Chinese: 韩志强
- Traditional Chinese: 韓志強
Transcriptions
Standard Mandarin
- Hanyu Pinyin: Hán Zhìqiáng

Han Zhiqiang (born November 1963) is a Chinese diplomat who served as Chinese ambassador to Thailand from 2021 to 2025. He was Chinese ambassador to Fiji from 2008 to 2011.

== Biography ==
Han was born in Yitong Manchu Autonomous County, Jilin, in November 1963. He graduated from Jilin University, majoring in Japanese. After university, he was dispatched to the Ministry of Foreign Affairs, becoming deputy director of the General Office in 2005. He once served as secretary to Minister Tang Jiaxuan. In November 2008, he succeeded Cai Jinbiao as Chinese ambassador to Fiji, serving until June 2011. He was Chinese envoy to Japan in July 2011, and held that office until February 2016. In February 2016, he was recalled to the original department and promoted to the director position. In August 2021, he was appointed Chinese ambassador to Thailand, replacing Lü Jian.

Diplomatic posts
Preceded by Cai Jinbiao	Chinese Ambassador to Fiji; 2008–2011	Succeeded by Huang Yong
Preceded by Lü Jian	Chinese Ambassador to Thailand; 2021–present	Incumbent
