= List of ambassadors of China to Vanuatu =

Coordinates: 17.762304°S 168.309875°E

Chinese Ambassador to Vanuatu
- Inaugural holder: Shen Zhiwei
- Formation: February 1983; 43 years ago

The Chinese ambassador to Vanuatu is the official representative of the People's Republic of China to the Republic of Vanuatu.

== List of representatives ==
Diplomatic agrément/Diplomatic accreditation	Ambassador	Chinese language zh:中国驻瓦努阿图大使列表	Observations	Premier of the People's Republic of China	Prime Minister of Vanuatu	Term end
February 1983	Shen Zhiwei	申志伟	With residence in Suva Fiji Islands.	Zhao Ziyang	Walter Lini	June 1985
February 1986	Ji Chaozhu	zh:冀朝铸	With residence in Suva Fiji Islands.	Zhao Ziyang	Walter Lini	May 1987
September 1987	Xu Mingyuan (PRC diplomat)	徐明远	With residence in Suva Fiji Islands.	Li Peng	Walter Lini	March 1991
July 1991	Du Zhongying	杜钟瀛		Li Peng	Walter Lini	August 1993
July 1993	Zhan Daode	zh:詹道德	(*July 1938): From September 1993 to October 1996 he was ambassador in Port Vila.; From January 1997 to January 1999 he was Chinese Ambassador to Barbados with accreditation in Antigua and Barbuda.	Li Peng	Donald Kalpokas	October 1996
November 1996	Liao Jincheng	廖金城		Li Peng	Serge Vohor	February 1999
March 1999	Huang Dongbi	黄东璧		Zhu Rongji	Donald Kalpokas	March 2001
March 2000	Wu Zurong	吴祖荣		Zhu Rongji	Barak Sopé	October 2004
October 2004	Bao Shusheng	鲍树生		Wen Jiabao	Serge Vohor	June 2007
August 2007	Cheng Shuping	程树平		Wen Jiabao	Ham Lini	August 2012
August 2012	Xie Bohua	谢波华		Wen Jiabao	Sato Kilman	February 2016
March 2016	Liu Quan (PRC diplomat)	刘全		Li Keqiang	Charlot Salwai	March 2023

== See also ==
- China–Vanuatu relations
