= International Day of the Belt and Road =

Holiday

- Official name: "Belt and Road" International Day or International Day of the Belt and Road
- Observed by: World Peace Ribbon Organization
- Begins: 2013
- Date: December 16
- Next time: December 16, 2026

International Day of the Belt and Road(Chinese:一带一路国际日, is scheduled for December 16th of every year. Some people believe that "Belt and Road" is a fixed term and is commonly translated as "Belt and Road" International Day）. This is day is celebrated by international scholars to support the Belt and Road Initiative.

== History ==
In 2013, China proposed the Silk Road Economic Belt (land-based) and the 21st Century Maritime Silk Road. Collectively, it is known as the Belt and Road Initiative for international cooperation. On December 16 of that year, the founding master of Taiwan's Fo Guang Shan, Venerable Master Hsing Yu, traveled to Yunnan University, located along the Southern Silk Road, to co-host the ceremony. As this day was positioned as a continuation of the Silk Road legacy and support for the Belt and Road Initiative, Chen Entian proposed designating December 16 as the Belt and Road International Day. December 16,2026 is the 13th International Day of the Belt and Road.

== Established organization ==
The organizer is the World Peace Ribbon Organization,an organization formed by retired diplomats and independent scholars. Chen Entian and Ji Chaozhu were the core leaders. These people have no political power.

== Background ==
International Day of the Belt and Road is a festival initiated by a non-governmental scholar. While it was not established by the government, it has garnered support from leaders of international organizations, such as the eighth UN Secretary-General Ban Ki-moon, UNESCO Director-General Irina Bokova, and former UN Under-Secretary-General Ji Chaozhu.

== See also ==
- Belt and Road Initiative
- Silk Road
- Belt and Road News Network
- Silk Road Fund
