= Sheng Zhongliang =

Chinese diplomat (1907–2007)

Chinese Ambassador to Iraq from Republic of China to Iraq
- In office 1950–1954
- Preceded by: Li Tiezheng
- Succeeded by: Chih-Ping Chen

Chinese Ambassador to Uruguay from Republic of China to Uruguay
- In office 1959 – October 24, 1962
- Preceded by: Tan Shao-hua 谭绍华
- Succeeded by: Wang Chih-chen, with residence in Buenos Aires.

Personal details
- Born: August 27, 1907 Shimen County, Hubei, China
- Died: March 29, 2007 (aged 99)
- Party: Chinese Communist Party; Kuomintang

Sheng Zhongliang (Chinese: 盛忠亮, August 27, 1907 – March 29, 2007) was a Chinese diplomat. He was a member of the 28 Bolsheviks.

He was born in Shimen County, Hubei. He studied at Moscow Sun Yat-sen University in the Soviet Union. He returned to China in January 1933. In August 1934, Li Zhusheng, another member of the 28 Bolsheviks was captured by the Kuomintang and defected, resulting in Sheng's capture on October 4, 1934. On the advice of Gu Shunzhang, another former member of the Chinese Communist Party who had defected to the Kuomintang in 1931, Sheng himself joined the Kuomintang. As a member of the foreign ministry of the Nationalist Government, Sheng served as the Republic of China Ambassador to Uruguay and Iraq.
