= Nanfang Daily =

Chinese Communist Party newspaper

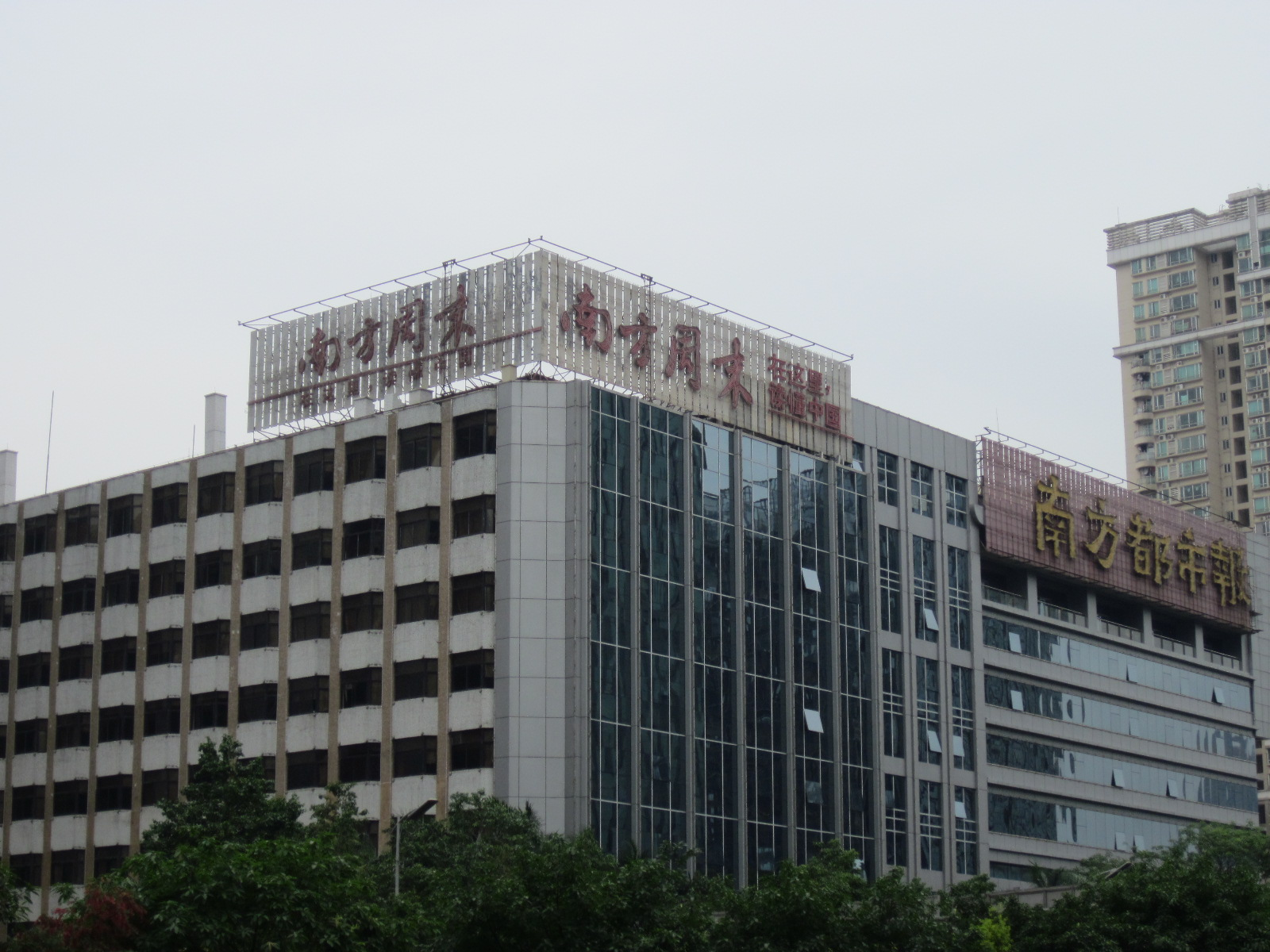
- Native name: 南方日报
- Type: Daily newspaper
- Format: Print, online
- Owner: Guangdong Provincial Committee of the Chinese Communist Party
- Founded: 23 October 1949; 76 years ago
- Political alignment: Chinese Communist Party
- Language: Chinese
- Website: epaper.southcn.com

Nanfang Daily
- Simplified Chinese: 南方日报
- Traditional Chinese: 南方日報
- Literal meaning: Southern Daily
Transcriptions
Standard Mandarin
- Hanyu Pinyin: Nánfāng rìbào
Yue: Cantonese
- Yale Romanization: nàahm fōng yaht bou
- Jyutping: naam4 fong1 jat6 bou3

The Nanfang Daily (traditional Chinese: 南方日報; simplified Chinese: 南方日报; pinyin: Nánfāng rìbào), also known as Southern Daily and Nanfang Ribao, is the official newspaper of the Guangdong Provincial Committee of the Chinese Communist Party and published by the Nanfang Media Group, a state-owned media conglomerate.

== History ==
The paper was established in Guangzhou on 23 October 1949.

Eight days prior, Ye Jianying arrived in Guangzhou, surrounded and disarmed all speculators, and arrested more than ten journalists for re-education. The premises and equipment of the Kuomintang's Central Daily were immediately seized and taken over. The paper was changed to Nanfang Daily, first published on 23 October 1949.

The newspaper is eponymous to the more lively and commercial Southern Metropolis Daily and part of the giant Nanfang Daily Newspaper Group. In March 2018, Nanfang Daily won the Third National Top 100 Newspapers in China.

An article from Brown University pointed out that Nanfang Daily has superior reporting and a somewhat higher level of frankness than many mainstream press outlets in China.

In 2025, the Nanfang Media Group established four platforms – IP Guangdong, INFO Guangdong, LIVE Guangdong, and GO Guangdong – to attract content creators and foreign influencers to better project soft power.

== See also ==
- Hua Shang Daily – predecessor of Southern Daily
