= Fan Changjiang =

Chinese journalist and writer (1909–1970)

- 范长江
- Born: Fan Xitian; October 6, 1909; Neijiang, Sichuan, Qing Empire
- Died: October 23, 1970 (aged 61); Queshan, Henan, China
- Occupations: Journalist, writer

Fan Changjiang (simplified Chinese: 范长江; traditional Chinese: 范長江; Wade–Giles: Fan Ch'ang-chiang; 6 October 1909 – 23 October 1970), born Fan Xitian (范希天), was a Chinese journalist, war correspondent, and writer. One of the most famous wartime reporters during World War II, he had become well known for his reporting during the 1936 battles in Inner Mongolia and his interview with Mao Zedong in 1937. Fan was persecuted during the Cultural Revolution and committed suicide in 1970.

== Biography ==
=== Early life ===
Fan was born in Sichuan Province and educated at Peking University.

=== Journalism career ===
Fan started his career as a journalist in 1933. He was sent to the northwest of China by Ta Kung Pao as a string correspondent in 1935. At that time, he editorialized a series of news which sensationalized the public. These pieces of news were later anthologized in a book called Northwest China (中國的西北角). In this book, he described the Chinese Communist Party (CCP), the activities of Red Army and the Long March. Besides that, Fan Changjiang showed his determination and strong animosity towards feudalism warlords, rich landowners and bad scholars in this book. Meanwhile, he concerned with the development of China's future and also sympathized those who suffered from the political turmoil.

In 1936, when the political scene became chaotic and the Chinese Civil War began, he went to the Inner Mongolia. In December, when the famous Xi'an Incident broke out, Fan grasped the opportunity to interview Zhou Enlai at the risk of his life. Zhou was amazed by his studies and analyses when he read his journals.

Later on, he went to Shaanxi province Yan'an to have a personal conversation with Mao Zedong. This interview paved the way for Fan's future career as a journalist. When he returned to Shanghai, he published his viewpoints on the anti-Japanese movement and it was well accepted by the public. At that time, he was the first journalist who reported on the Red Terror in China.

On November 8, 1937, Fan established the Chinese Young Journalists Association (中國青年記者協會) with Yang Zao (羊棗) and Xu Maijin (徐邁進) and was elected as the chief executive officer of the association. In the same year, he co-founded the International News Association (國際新聞社) with Hu Yuzhi in Changsha.

In 1939, he joined the CCP and was one of the people who established Hua Shang Daily (華商) in Hong Kong. He also took up the posts of the principal of Huangzhong Journalism College (華中新聞專科學校), chairman of Huangzhong Branch of the Xinhua News Agency and Huangzhong Post of Xinhua Daily.

In July 1949, he established the All-China Journalists Association with Hu Qiaomu and many other famous journalists. He was the chief editor of the Xinhua News Agency, chairman of Jiefang Daily and People's Daily.

In 1991, the "Fan Changjiang Journalism Awards" were established by the Chinese Journalists Association Committee in order to encourage young journalists in China.

=== Fan's posts and his careers ===
In addition to being an award-winning journalist, Fan was also considered a good leader by others. He held various official posts, such as:

1. President of Huangzhong Journalism College in 1939
2. Chairman of Huangzhong Branch of Xinhua News Agency in 1939
3. Chairman of Huangzhong Post of Xinhua Daily in 1939
4. Chief editor of Xinhua News Agency in 1949
5. President of Jiefang Daily and People's Daily in 1949
6. Vice-chancellor of the General Administration of Press and Publication
7. Vice-secretary of the State Council Committee of Culture and Education (政務院文化教育委員會副秘書長)
8. Second director of office of the State Council of the People's Republic of China
9. Vice minister in charge of the Commission for Science, Technology and Industry for National Defense

== Ideology ==
=== Ideology in newspaper aspect ===
In the book, Communication and essay, Fan believed that newspaper was a political tool. It was the basic principle of journalism. A journalist should not fear to discuss politics, should not tend to avoid politics. More importantly, journalist should not violate era. In addition, Fan suggested that if there were correct politics to make instructions, the news work would be an important power to accelerate the advancement of the society.

=== Obligation to tell the truth ===
Fan had a clear political and journalistic stand. When he was young, he was greatly influenced by the revolutionary movement and joined series of anti-imperialism movements. He was almost sent to death in the Chongqing Massacre. But this experience further strengthened his ideology which was to seek and report the truth. He believed that honesty should be the most important element of being a journalist.

=== Political views ===
Fan believed that journalists should support the reforms and determine to be loyal to the CCP. The public should not fear danger and harshness but have incentive to learn and think. He even became a communist journalist and joined CCP after he left Ta Kung Pao. He was strongly against the capitalist class and supported communism.

=== Loyalty to citizens ===
As described before, Fan wrote a series of articles disclosing the north-west rotten policy, the secret agreements and the hidden side of the red army. What he wanted to show to the people was the urgent need for revolution. He insisted that all his reports and articles should let the people know what was happening in their country.

=== Views on journalism ===
Fan claimed that a reporter who intended to write excellent journal articles, one must get himself involved in the public. He thought that journalism was the fact of what people want to know and what people should know but had not known. Fan said "This is a thought which is not very across the board, but it does penetrate a spirit to serve the public. As a reporter or journalist, we should always learn to examine the problems and issues raised up by the public and citizens which means to learn what you report. We should also learn the technique of writing by being aware of the response of the public. If the article is not related to the public, there is always no response or voice. Public is considered as the source of journalism, so newspaper should always think of ways to let reporters and journalists get connected to it."

== Fan and journalism in China ==
As the president of the Chinese Journalists Association Committee, Fan focused on the overall development of journalism in China. He once said, "A telegraph, a letter or a news article influence the attitude of the readers towards the war. It influences the feeling of soldiers in the frontier and the morale of workers at the back." Fan emphasized that journalism played an extremely important role during war. He requested all the journalists to have respectable personality, important sense of responsibility and outstanding quality in news reporting. Fan also pointed out the importance of strengthening self-education as well as the promotion of noble-quality with combinations of present political, social and journalistic environment for young journalists.

=== Famous journals of Fan ===
After his journey to Xi'an and Yan'an, he was employed by Da Gong Bao as a reporter. At that period of time, he wrote a lot of articles such as

- Cong Jiayushuo Dao Shanhaiguan ("From Jiayu Pass to Shanhai Pass"《從嘉峪說到山海關》)
- Bailingmiao Zhan Hou Hang ("The War in Bailingmiao" 《百靈廟戰後行》)
- Yi Xi Meng《憶西蒙》

On 7 July 1937, the Marco Polo Bridge Incident broke out. Fan went there to investigate the event. He went to Lugouqiao, Changxindian, etc. Fan wrote plenty of battlefield communications including

- Beside the Lugouqiao《盧溝橋畔》
- Xi Xian Feng Yun《西線風雲》
- Shiue Bo Ping Jin《血泊平津》

After China Young Journalists Association was founded, Fan went to the Tianjin–Pukou railway, where the Second Sino-Japanese War was the fiercest, to report the event. He wrote a lot of communications to reveal the war situation and front tactical situation in Tai'erzhuang. Those communications were compiled and printed under the headline "Breakthrough at Xuzhou" (徐州突圍).

=== China Young Journalists Association ===
It was established by Fan and other journalists at Shanghai in 1937. The aim of this association was to unite all journalists at that time and to spread the message of protecting China against the Japanese invasion. This association later became the All-China Journalists Association. The day of its establishment, November 8, has been proclaimed by the Central government and the CCP as "Journalists' day" (記者節) since 2000. This day serves as a reminder to Chinese people of the devotion and dedication of the former and contemporary journalists.

=== International News Association ===
During the Second Sino-Japanese War, Fan Changjiang, Hu Yuzhi and other journalists founded the International News Association at Changsha in 1936. Fan was the president of this association at that time. It was a left-leaning press agency during the period that China was still under the ruling of Kuomintang. It had a legal news gathering and the right of reporting to release the news and reviews of the Sino-Japanese War to the newspaper publishers in mainland China and the rest of the world, especially the news of the CCP, the Eighth Route Army and the New Fourth Army.

=== Fan Changjiang Journalism Award ===
The Fan Changjiang Journalism Award is one of the three national journalists awards (the other two are the Taofen Journalism Award and Top 100 Journalists) issued by the All-China Journalists Association (ACJA). This is a prize for middle-aged and young journalists. It is named after Fan for his bold and objective coverage of the Chinese Communist Revolution led by the CCP against the Kuomintang regime. The award started in 1991. Since 2000, the award is issued by the ACJA every two years (with the other two awards simultaneously). In the first three Fan Changjiang Journalism Awards, 10 reporters would receive the award and 30 reporters would receive the nominated award each time. But the nominated awards were cancelled starting from the fourth Awards. The nominee should age below 50 and work in the field of formal journals, public newspapers, national press agency, authorized radio stations, television stations and other news agency, with a minimum of 10-years successive reporter experience.

== Fan and literature in China ==
Fan Changjiang is considered as one of the renown journalists in Chinese history. He had written news articles and taken up a lot of leading positions in this field. His style of writing are considered as modern, righteous and vivid.

=== Sai Shang Xing ===
Sai Shang Xing (塞上行) is a book written by Fan Changjiang in 1937. The Xi'an Incident was a turning point in Chinese political history. At that time, Fan's journey to Xi'an and Yan'an as a reporter had changed his political standpoint from a patriotic [journalist to a communist who fought for the proletariat. The release of his book The Journey to Northern Shaanxi (陝北之行) facilitated the understanding of Chinese citizens from different classes about the CCP and Red Army. It also spread out the idea of unity of the nation against Japan. It was the first time Fan got direct contact with the CCP and his mind got changed after talking to Mao Zedong overnight. Later, Mao even wrote two letters to Fan answering his questions concerning the topic about the unity of the nation against Japan. Mao also affirmed Fan's news article on Xiabei. Sai Shang Xing is a book and a record of Fan's change of his mind.

=== Northwest China ===
This book revealed the rotten policy in the north-west side. It also showed the hidden side of the red army and exposed all the secret agreements made among the leaders at that time. Fan definitely told people the truth. He wasn't afraid of the pressures from the government and reported it in the book to express his concerns on the country. Hu Yuzhi commented that “it is an excellent work which shocks all the Chinese.”

=== Communication and Essay ===
In this book, Fan described the use of communications and essays clearly which not only gave a format and spirit to the youth journalists for reporting, but also for the writers have the sense of persuasive communication.

=== Collection of Fan Changjiang's News Articles ===
"Collection of Fan Changjiang's News Article" was published in 1989. It contains some parts of the news articles written by Fan without editing. It focuses and respects on the original face of those records, just like Fan said in the preface that "Journalists must respect history, must respect the reality".

== Fan and the Xi'an Incident in China ==
On December 12, 1936, Xi'an Incident broke out in China during the invasion of Japan and nationalist-communist confrontation (1927–1936), which had great effects on political and military aspects. Fan Changjiang, as a reporter, headed to Xi'an in order to unveil the situation to the public. He said, 'I determined to go to Xi'an to unveil the truth of China's politics at all costs.' He gained the insight into the current affairs. Fan went there alone to find out the mysteries of Xi'an Incident.

On February 4, 1937, Fan was finally permitted to interview CCP negotiator Zhou Enlai, who would become the first premier of People's Republic of China in 1954. Zhou told him all the details about Xi'an Incident, such as the reasons of the incident, the ideas of the CCP and the important issues about defensing the country against Japan. All these information had made Fan's articles even more accurate and in-depth.

Later, with the permission of Zhou, Fan went to Yan'an with great welcome for further details or even investigation. In Yan'an, he visited the "Red Army University" (紅軍大學) and interviewed some senior and important officers in the CCP, for example, Lin Biao, Liao Chengzhi and Zhu De, especially the first chairman of People's Republic of China, Mao Zedong on February 9.

Fan told Mao that he wanted to stay in northern Shaanxi; in order to get more information about CCP, so that he could write a few book on them to propagate the party ideology. However, Mao pointed out that the most important thing was to utilize the important position of Ta Kung Pao in the public to propagate the ideas and policies of CCP, so the co-operation between the CCP and Kuomintang could be facilitated.

After returning to Shanghai, Fan wrote the news article Turmoil in the Northwest (動盪中之西北大局) on the Ta Kung Pao on February 16. This article finally shocked the public and embarrassed Chiang Kai-shek, the leader of Nationalist Government by unveiling the truth in Xi'an. Mao was glad after reading his article and even wrote a letter to Fan to appreciate his efforts.

Fan had written a lot of exclusive articles about Red Army March and Xi'an Incident, which acted as a forwarding power to the Chinese history. He was an initial reporter writing about the details of Red Army March in his two articles called "Minshan Nanbei Jiaofei Zhi Xianshi" (岷山南北剿匪軍事之現勢) and "Chenglan Jixing" (成蘭紀行).

== See also ==
- Zou Taofen
