= Li Zhusheng =

Chinese politician (1903–1973)

Li Zhusheng (Chinese: 李竹声) (1903 – 1973), also known as Li Mengda (Chinese: 李孟达), alias Yu Qiquan (Chinese: 余其全), was a member of the 28 Bolsheviks. He was born in Anhui Province. In 1925, he left Anqing for the Soviet Union, where he studied at Moscow Sun Yat-sen University. In January 1937, he returned to China and went to Shanghai. On June 26, 1934, he was arrested by the Kuomintang secret police, and while imprisoned, betrayed other members of the Chinese Communist Party, including Sheng Zhongliang, another member of the 28 Bolsheviks who he had been classmates with in Moscow. In January 1935, he was given a position as a Russian language translator on the behalf of the CC Clique. In 1939, he was made a formal member of the Kuomintang. In 1948, he was made head Russian translator in Shanghai. In March 1951, he was arrested by the People's Republic of China police and brought to Beijing, where he was imprisoned in Qincheng Prison. He died of old age in prison.
