= Liu Guijin =

Chinese diplomat

- 刘贵今

Chinese ambassador to South Africa
- In office March 2001 – April 2007
- Preceded by: Wang Xuexian
- Succeeded by: Zhong Jianhua

Chinese ambassador to Zimbabwe
- In office December 1995 – January 1998
- Preceded by: Gu Xin'er
- Succeeded by: Huang Guifang

Personal details
- Born: August 1945 (age 81) Yuncheng County, Shandong, China
- Party: Chinese Communist Party
- Education: Shanghai International Studies University
- Awards: July 1 Medal (2021)

Chinese name
- Simplified Chinese: 刘贵今
- Traditional Chinese: 劉貴今
Transcriptions
Standard Mandarin
- Hanyu Pinyin: Liú Guìjīn

Liu Guijin (born August 1945) is a retired Chinese diplomat who served as Chinese ambassador to South Africa between 2001 and 2007, Chinese ambassador to Zimbabwe between 1995 and 1998, and as China's first Special Representative on African Affairs.

== Biography ==
Liu was born in Yuncheng County, Shandong, in August 1945. He graduated from Shanghai International Studies University. He joined the Chinese Communist Party in August 1971.

Liu joined the Foreign Service in 1972 and has served primarily in Africa. Since 1981, he worked at the Chinese Embassy in Kenya. He returned to China in 1986 and was dispatched to the Africa Department of the Ministry of Foreign Affairs. In 1990, he became Chinese counsellor in Ethiopia. Three years later, he returned to China and was appointed deputy director of the Africa Department of the Ministry of Foreign Affairs. In December 1995, he succeeded Gu Xin'er as Chinese Ambassador to Zimbabwe, serving in that position from 1995 to 1998. Then he was appointed director of the Africa Department of the Ministry of Foreign Affairs. In March 2001, President Hu Jintao appointed him Chinese ambassador to South Africa, a post in which he served from 2001 to 2007.

On 10 May 2007, he became the first Special Representative of the Chinese Government on African Affairs.

During the War in Darfur, China initially resisted pressure to involve itself, with Liu stating that "Darfur is not China's Darfur. Firstly it is Sudan's Darfur and second it is Africa's Darfur." Ultimately, however, China indicated to Sudanese President Omar al-Bashir that it could not continue to support Sudan's position in United Nations matters, convincing him to accept peacekeepers, and brokering the deployment of the African Union-United Nations Hybrid Operation in Darfur. China's mediation efforts were widely praised within the international community.

During the 2013 South Sudanese Civil War, Chinese policymakers had consider whether to relinquish oil fields and other investments or to continue to maintain them during the conflict. Liu described South Sudan's near-total economic dependence on oil as contributing to the Chinese government's "sense of responsibility" to help protect South Sudan's economic future. Ultimately, a minimum team of Chinese nationals working for the China National Petroleum Company remained to continue oil production. This decision allowed South Sudan's oil sector to continue to operate although CNPC suffered huge losses given high transportation costs and low international oil prices. Continuing oil production helped China to earn trust from the South Sudanese government and support from the international community for its contribution in stabilizing South Sudan's economy.

== Awards ==
- 2021 July 1 Medal

Diplomatic posts
Preceded by Gu Xin'er	Chinese ambassador to Zimbabwe; 1995–1998	Succeeded by Huang Guifang
Preceded by Wang Xuexian	Chinese ambassador to South Africa; 2001–2007	Succeeded by Zhong Jianhua
