= China–Kiribati relations =

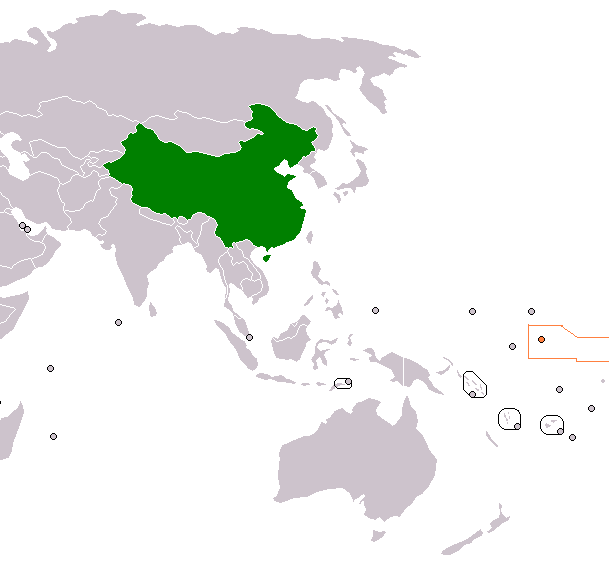

- China: Kiribati

The Republic of Kiribati and the People's Republic of China (PRC) established diplomatic relations on June 25, 1980, and resumed on September 27, 2019. Between 2003 and 2019, The government of Kiribati recognized the Republic of China, and, in accordance with the "One China" policy, the People's Republic of China did not have diplomatic relations to the country.

== Context ==
Oceania is, to the People's Republic of China and the Republic of China (Taiwan), a stage for continuous diplomatic competition. Eight states in Oceania recognize the PRC, and six recognise the ROC. These numbers fluctuate as Pacific Island nations re-evaluate their foreign policies, and occasionally shift diplomatic recognition between Beijing and Taipei. In keeping with the "One China" policy, it is not possible for any country to maintain official diplomatic relations with "both Chinas", and this "either/or" factor has resulted in the PRC and the ROC actively courting diplomatic favours from small Pacific nations. In 2003, the People's Republic of China announced it intended to enhance its diplomatic ties with the Pacific Islands Forum, and increase the economic aid package it provided to that organisation. At the same time, PRC delegate Zhou Whenzhong added: "The PIF should refrain from any exchanges of an official nature or dialogue partnership of any form with Taiwan". In 2006, Chinese Premier Wen Jiabao announced that the PRC would increase its economic cooperation with Pacific Island States. The PRC would provide more economic aid, abolish tariffs for exports from the Pacific's least developed countries, annul the debt of those countries, distribute free anti-malaria medicines, and provide training for two thousand Pacific Islander government officials and technical staff. Also in 2006, Wen became the first Chinese premier to visit the Pacific islands, which the Taipei Times described as "a longtime diplomatic battleground for China and Taiwan". Similarly, according to Ron Crocombe, Professor of Pacific Studies at the University of the South Pacific, "There have been more Pacific Islands minister visits to China than to any other country".

== History and current situation ==
Kiribati first established official diplomatic relations with the People's Republic of China in 1980, and maintained them for twenty-three years. In November 2003, Tarawa established diplomatic relations with Taipei, and Beijing severed its relations with the country. For the PRC, relations with Kiribati had been relatively important, since Beijing had a satellite-tracking station established there (since 1997). Therefore, for three weeks the PRC called upon I-Kiribati President Anote Tong to break off relations with Taiwan and re-affirm his support for the "One China" policy. Only after those three weeks did the PRC sever relations, thereby losing the right to maintain its satellite-tracking base in Kiribati. The Republic of China began providing economic aid to Kiribati, while Kiribati began supporting Taiwan in the United Nations.

In September 2019, Kiribati restored the diplomatic relations with the People's Republic of China following termination of diplomatic relations with the Republic of China, shortly after the Solomon Islands have done so. On May 15, 2020, the Chinese embassy in Kiribati reopened.

Kiribati joined the Belt and Road Initiative (BRI) in 2020.

On 15 July 2023, the Chinese military hospital ship Peace Ark made harbor at Tarawa, Kiribati, the first Chinese military vessel to visit Kiribati. The seven-day visit was to include humanitarian and medical assistance, part of China's effort to build relationships in the region, and was to be followed by stops in Tonga, Vanuatu, the Solomon Islands and East Timor.

In February 2024, Kiribati's police commissioner Aritiera confirmed that Chinese officers were assisting with community policing and management of crime data. According to Aritiera, up to six officers were on a six-month rotation and “...only provide the service that the Kiribati Police Service needs or request.”

Effective 1 December 2024, China eliminated tariffs for goods imported from all of the countries that the United Nations categorizes as least developed and with which China has diplomatic relations, including Kiribati.

== See also ==
- Sino-Pacific relations#Kiribati
- Chinese Ambassador to Kiribati
