= Zhuang Yan =

Chinese diplomat

Ambassador of China to Bangladesh
- In office May 1976 – November 1979
- Preceded by: Office created
- Succeeded by: Liu Shuqing

Ambassador to Iran
- In office April 1, 1980 – December 1, 1982
- Preceded by: Jiao Ruoyu
- Succeeded by: Fan Zuokai

Ambassador of China to Greece
- In office May 1983 – May 1985

Personal details
- Born: February 1918
- Died: March 5, 2017 (age 99)

Zhuang Yan (February 1918 – March 5, 2017) was a Chinese diplomat. He served as the first Ambassador of the People's Republic of China to Bangladesh from 1976 to 1979, Ambassador to Iran from 1980 to 1982 in the aftermath of the 1979 Iranian Revolution, and Ambassador of Greece from 1983 to 1985.

Chinese diplomat Jiao Ruoyu was Ambassador to Iran at the time of the Iranian Revolution of 1979 which overthrew Shah Mohammad Reza Pahlavi and established the Islamic Republic of Iran. In August 1979, months after the revolution, Ambassador Jiao returned to China after the Chinese government refused to apologize to Iran for its relations with Pahlavi. China declined to send a new Ambassador to Iran for the remainder of 1979, marking a period of strained relations between the two countries.

In April 1980, China appointed Zhuang Yan as its new Ambassador to Iran. Diplomatic experts viewed Zhuang's appointment as a small gesture by the Chinese to improve relations with Iran. In May 1980, Zhuang Yan arranged the first high-level meetings between officials from the People's Republic of China and the Islamic Republic of Iran while both delegations were attending the funeral of Josip Broz Tito in Belgrade, Yugoslavia.

Zhuang went on to serve as Ambassador to Greece from May 1983 to May 1985, his last diplomatic posting as an ambassador.

Zhuang Yan died on March 5, 2017, at the age of 99. His death was announced by Chinese state media.

== See also ==
- China–Iran relations
