= Qiu Xuejun =

Chinese diplomat

- 邱学军

Chinese Ambassador to Namibia
- In office December 2016 – January 2017
- Preceded by: Xin Shunkang

Chinese Ambassador to Eritrea
- In office December 2014 – October 2016
- Preceded by: Niu Qiang
- Succeeded by: Yang Zigang

Personal details
- Born: January 1967 (age 59) China
- Party: Chinese Communist Party
- Education: Beijing International Studies University

Chinese name
- Simplified Chinese: 邱学军
- Traditional Chinese: 邱學軍
Transcriptions
Standard Mandarin
- Hanyu Pinyin: Qiū Xuéjūn

Qiu Xuejun (Chinese: 邱学军; born January 1967) is a Chinese diplomat and government officer. He is Deputy Director-General of the Department of Consular Affairs of the Chinese Foreign Ministry. He is also Director of the Center for Consular Assistance and Protection.

He was admitted to the major of English Language and Literature of Beijing International Studies University in 1985. Before assuming the office, he served successively as Deputy Consul General in San Francisco, USA from 2002 to 2005, and Counsellor and Consul General of the Chinese Embassy in the United States from 2005 to 2007.

Since December 2016 he is ambassador in Windhoek.

Diplomatic posts
Preceded by Niu Qiang	Chinese Ambassador to Eritrea; 2014–2016	Succeeded by Yang Zigang
Preceded by Xin Shunkang	Chinese Ambassador to Namibia; 2016–2017	Succeeded by Zhang Yiming
