= Hua Shang Daily =

- Type: Daily newspaper
- Founded: 8 April 1941
- Ceased publication: 15 October 1949
- Headquarters: Hong Kong

Hua Shang Daily (simplified Chinese: 华商报; traditional Chinese: 華商報), also known as China Commercial Daily, was a patriotic newspaper for united front led by Liao Chengzhi and Fan Changjiang and published in Hong Kong since 8 April 1941. Due to the outbreak of the Pacific War, it was stopped publishing in that year. After the Japanese surrender, Hua Shang Daily was restored publishing on 4 January 1946 and became a democratic publication. The newspaper supported democratic movement and opposed to the dictatorship of Chiang Kai-shek.

On 15 October 1949, Hua Shang Daily published an article titled Goodbye, my dearest readers! on the front page and then the publication was stopped. The company was moved to Guangzhou and published another newspaper called Nanfang Daily.

This newspaper has nothing to do with Chinese Business View, a Shaanxi newspaper of the same Chinese name and is also sometimes translated as Hua Shang Daily.
