= List of ambassadors of China to Iraq =

Coordinates: 33.297672°N 44.310391°E

Ambassador of China to Iraq
- Incumbent; Cui Wei since 26 April 2022
- Appointer: The president pursuant to a National People's Congress Standing Committee decision
- Inaugural holder: Li Tiezheng
- Formation: 31 July 1943; 83 years ago
- Website: Chinese Embassy – Baghdad

The ambassador of China to Iraq is the official representative of the People's Republic of China to the Republic of Iraq.

== List of representatives ==
=== Republic of China ===
Name	Chinese name	Appointment	Term end	Notes
Li Tiezheng	李铁铮	July 31, 1943	August 16, 1946	also accredited in Teheran (*1906 in Hunan January 28, 1990), In March 1943, Nationalist China's first legation was inaugurated in Baghdad, and Li Tiezheng was appointed modern China's first minister to Iraq. Since then, the Iraqi royal house maintained amicable relations with Chiang Kai-shek.
Sheng Zhongliang	盛忠亮	1950	1954	Chargé d'affaires
Chih-Ping Chen	陈质平	October 1956	May 1958	In March 1956 the legation was upgraded to an embassy.; After meeting with Abd al-Karim Qasim, Chen decided to break relations with Iraq, and flew the entire embassy staff with their families out of Baghdad on a chartered commercial plane.

=== People's Republic of China ===
Name	Chinese name	Appointment	Term end	Observations
Chen Zhifang	陈志方	September 1958	September 1960	
Zhang Weilie	张伟烈	September 1960	November 1965	From 1971 February to 1974 May he was ambassador in Rabat (Morocco).; From October 1974 to April 1978 he was ambassador in Almaty (Mongolia).; From July 1978 to June 1981 Ambassador in Bangkok Thailand.
Cao Chi	曹痴	April 1966	February 1967	From May 1955 to March 1, 1960 he was Mayor of Changsha.; From April 1966 to February 1967 he was Ambassador in Baghdad Iraq; From September 1972 to November 1977 he was Ambassador in Katmandu (Nepal).; From March 1978 to July 1982 he was Ambassador in Nikosia (Cyprus).
Gong Dafei	宫达非	December 1970	January 1973	From January 1973 to July 1978 he was Ambassador in Kinshasa (Zaire).
Hu Chengfang	胡成放	February 1973	May 1974	From April 1978 to December 1980 Ambassador in Santiago de Chile.
Zhao Xingzhi	赵行志	August 1974	November 1976	From August 1971 to May 1974 he was Ambassador to Cameroon.
Hou Yefeng	侯野峰	September 1977	December 1984	
Zhang Junhua	张俊华	January 1985	June 1988	From January 1978 to March 1982 he was Ambassador to Benin.; From June 1982 to November 1984 he was Ambassador to Zambia.
Zheng Jianying	郑剑英	January 1988	March 1990	From February 1983 - October 1985 Ambassador to Bangladesh
Zheng Dayong	郑达庸	June 1990	May 1994	From June 1989 to June 1990 he was Ambassador North Yemen / Yemen.; From June 1990 to May 1994 he was Ambassador Iraq.; From December 1993 to August 1997 he was Ambassador to Saudi Arabia.
Sun Bigan	孙必干	June 1994	August 1998	From September 1990-April 1994 he was Ambassador to Saudi Arabia.; From June 1994 to August 1998 was Ambassador to Iraq; From April 1999 to October 2002 he was Ambassador to Iran.
Zhang Weiqiu	张维秋	September 1998	March 2003	From December 1995 to August 1998 he was Ambassador to the Sudan.
Yang Honglin	杨洪林	October 2004	October 2005	From December 2000 - October 2003 he was Ambassador to Bahrain.; From October 2004 - October 2005 he was Ambassador to Iraq.; From November 2007 - October 2011 he was Ambassador to Saudi Arabia.
Li Huaxin	李华新	November 2005	February 2007	From April 2007 to August 2011 he was Ambassador to Syria.; Since June 2016 he is Ambassador to Saudi Arabia.
Chen Xiaodong	陈晓东	February 2007	May 2008	Since June 2015 he is Ambassador to Singapore
Chang Yi	常毅	June 2008	September 2011	
Ni Jian	倪坚	November 2011	November 2013	
Wang Yong	王勇	December 2013	February 2016	
Chen Weiqing	陈伟庆	March 2016	February 2019	
Zhang Tao	张涛	March 2019	April 2022	
Cui Wei	崔巍	April 2022	Incumbent	
