= Jiao Ruoyu =

Chinese politician (1915–2020)

Jiao Ruoyu (Chinese: 焦若愚; November 7, 1915 – January 1, 2020) was a People's Republic of China politician and diplomat. He was born in Ye County, Henan. He was deputy mayor of Shenyang under Huang Oudong. He was PRC Ambassador to North Korea (1965–1970), Peru (1972–1977) and Iran (1977–1979). He was mayor of Beijing (1981–1983). On August 14, 2012, Jiao, 97, was confirmed as the oldest member of the Chinese Communist Party to attend the 18th National Congress of the Chinese Communist Party. He celebrated his 100th birthday on November 7, 2015.

Preceded by Hao Deqing	Ambassador of China to North Korea; 1965–1970	Succeeded by Li Yunchuan
Preceded by new office	Ambassador of China to Peru; 1972–1977	Succeeded by Wang Ze
Preceded by Hao Deqing	Chinese Ambassador to Iran; 1977–1979	Succeeded by Zhuang Yan
Preceded by Lin Hujia	Mayor of Beijing; 1981–1983	Succeeded by Chen Xitong
