= Yang Zigang =

Chinese diplomat (born 1958)

- 杨子刚

Chinese Ambassador to Eritrea
- In office January 2017 – February 2020
- Preceded by: Qiu Xuejun
- Succeeded by: Cai Ge

Chinese Ambassador to Suriname
- In office March 2013 – April 2016
- Preceded by: Yuan Nansheng
- Succeeded by: Zhang Jinxiong

Personal details
- Born: September 1958 (age 67) Henan, China
- Political party: Chinese Communist Party

Chinese name
- Simplified Chinese: 杨子刚
- Traditional Chinese: 楊子剛
Transcriptions
Standard Mandarin
- Hanyu Pinyin: Yáng Zǐgāng

Yang Zigang (Chinese: 杨子刚; born September 1958) is a Chinese diplomat who served as Chinese Ambassador to Suriname from 2013 to 2016 and Chinese Ambassador to Eritrea from 2017 to 2020.

== Early life and education ==
Yang was born in Henan in September 1958.

== Career ==
He joined the Foreign Service in 1975 and has served primarily in the General Office of the Ministry of Foreign Affairs of the People's Republic of China, where he was promoted to deputy director in 1999. He was deputy special representative of The Commissioner's Office of China's Foreign Ministry in the Hong Kong S.A.R. in 2007 and subsequently envoy to the Embassy of China, Washington, D.C. in 2010. In March 2013, President Xi Jinping appointed him Chinese Ambassador to Suriname according to the decision of the 12th National People's Congress Standing Committee, a post in which he served from 2013 to 2016. In January 2017, he succeeded Qiu Xuejun as Chinese Ambassador to Eritrea, and held that office until February 2020.

== Award ==
- 8 April 2016 Palm Medal of Honor

Diplomatic posts
| Preceded by Yuan Nansheng | Chinese Ambassador to Suriname; 2013–2016 | Succeeded by Zhang Jinxiong |
| Preceded by Qiu Xuejun | Chinese Ambassador to Eritrea; 2017–2020 | Succeeded by Cai Ge |
