= Sun Bigan =

Chinese diplomat (1941–2022)

Chinese Ambassador to Iran
- In office 1 April 1999 – 1 June 2002
- Preceded by: Wang Shijie
- Succeeded by: Liu Zhentang

Chinese Ambassador to Iraq
- In office June 1994 – August 1998
- Preceded by: Zheng Dayong
- Succeeded by: Zhang Weiqiu

Chinese Ambassador to Saudi Arabia
- In office September 1990 – April 1994
- Preceded by: Guan Yong
- Succeeded by: Zheng Dayong

Personal details
- Born: June 1941 China
- Died: 12 January 2022 (aged 80)

Sun Bigan (Chinese: 孙必干; June 1941 – 12 January 2022) was a Chinese diplomat who served as the ambassador to several Middle Eastern countries and as China's Special Envoy on Middle East Issues.

He served as Chinese Ambassador to Saudi Arabia from 1990 to 1994, Chinese Ambassador to Iraq from 1994 to 1998, and Chinese Ambassador to Iran from 1999 to 2002. Sun was also part of the team that re-established the Chinese embassy in Baghdad.

From 2006 to 2009, Sun served as China's Special Envoy on Middle East Issues. During his tenure, China heavily criticized Israel for its disproportionate use of force against Lebanon in 2006.

He died on 12 January 2022, at the age of 80.

Diplomatic posts
Preceded by Wang Shijie	Ambassador of China to Iran; April 1999 – October 2002	Succeeded by Liu Zhentang
Preceded by Zheng Dayong	Ambassador of China to Iraq; June 1994 – August 1998	Succeeded by Zhang Weiqiu
