= Ji Chaozhu =

Chinese diplomat (1929–2020)

- 冀朝铸
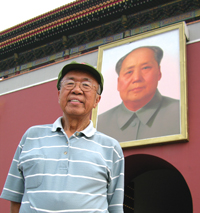
- Ji Chaozhu at Tiananmen Square in 2005

Under-Secretary-General of the United Nations for Department for Development Support and Management Services
- In office 1991–1996
- Secretary-General: Javier Pérez de Cuéllar; Boutros Boutros-Ghali

Ambassador of China to the United Kingdom
- In office August 1987 – March 1991
- Preceded by: Hu Dingyi
- Succeeded by: Ma Yuzhen

Ambassador of China to Fiji with accreditation as Ambassador to Kiribati & Vanuatu
- In office September 1985 – May 1987
- Preceded by: Shen Zhiwei
- Succeeded by: Xu Mingyuan

Personal details
- Born: July 30, 1929 Taiyuan, Shanxi, China
- Died: April 29, 2020 (aged 90) Beijing, China
- Relations: Ji Gongquan (father); Ji Chaoding (elder brother); Chao-Li Chi (elder brother)
- Occupation: Diplomat, author

Chinese name
- Traditional Chinese: 冀朝鑄
- Simplified Chinese: 冀朝铸
Transcriptions
Standard Mandarin
- Hanyu Pinyin: Jì Cháozhù

Ji Chaozhu (July 30, 1929 – April 29, 2020) was a Chinese English language diplomatic interpreter and diplomat who held diverse positions in the Ministry of Foreign Affairs of the People's Republic of China (PRC). Most notably, he was English interpreter for Chairman Mao Zedong, Premier Zhou Enlai and Deng Xiaoping, Ambassador to the Court of St. James's (United Kingdom), and then served as an Under-secretary General of the United Nations, a post from which he retired in 1996. He was one of the principle interpreters in the talks leading up to and during President Richard M. Nixon's historic 1972 visit to China.

His memoir, The Man on Mao's Right, was published in July 2008, by Random House.

== Early years in U.S. ==
Ji was born on July 30, 1929, in Taiyuan, Shanxi Province to an affluent family who were also sympathetic to the Communist Party. His father, Ji Gongquan, was a land-owner, lawyer, and provincial official, while his eldest brother, Ji Chaoding, was a secret member of the Chinese Communist Party who earned a Ph.D. in economics at Columbia University. Ji and his family fled Fengyang, their family home, in 1937, at the outset of the Second Sino-Japanese War. At the urging of Zhou Enlai, who had established relations with Chaoding in the mid-1920s, Ji's family came as refugees to New York City in 1939, when Ji was nine years old.

Ji earned a high school diploma from Horace Mann-Lincoln High School (now known as Horace Mann School), and attended Camp Rising Sun in 1944. He was a sophomore at Harvard University in 1950 when the Korean War broke out, which saw his native homeland and his adopted country fight on opposite sides. Ji described how he "was torn between [his] love for two countries", but knew that he "was fundamentally Chinese".

== Return to China ==
Ji left Harvard at the beginning of his junior year and returned to the newly formed People's Republic of China. When he could not join China's nuclear program, he studied chemistry at Tsinghua University in Beijing, He was instead selected to be notetaker at the negotiations in Panmunjom that would eventually bring an end to the Korean War, due to his English-language skills. After two years in Korea, he returned to Beijing where he was recruited to accompany Zhou to the 1954 Geneva Conference, and to the Bandung Conference in 1955 . For most of the next two decades, he was a close aide to Zhou, and a frequent interpreter for Mao, often appearing on Mao's right on the reviewing stand at Tiananmen Square during public celebrations when English-speaking dignitaries were present. He holds the distinction of having been interpreter for Mao Zedong's last two official visits with English-speaking dignitaries, in 1976, months before the chairman's death.

== Role in Sino-American relations ==
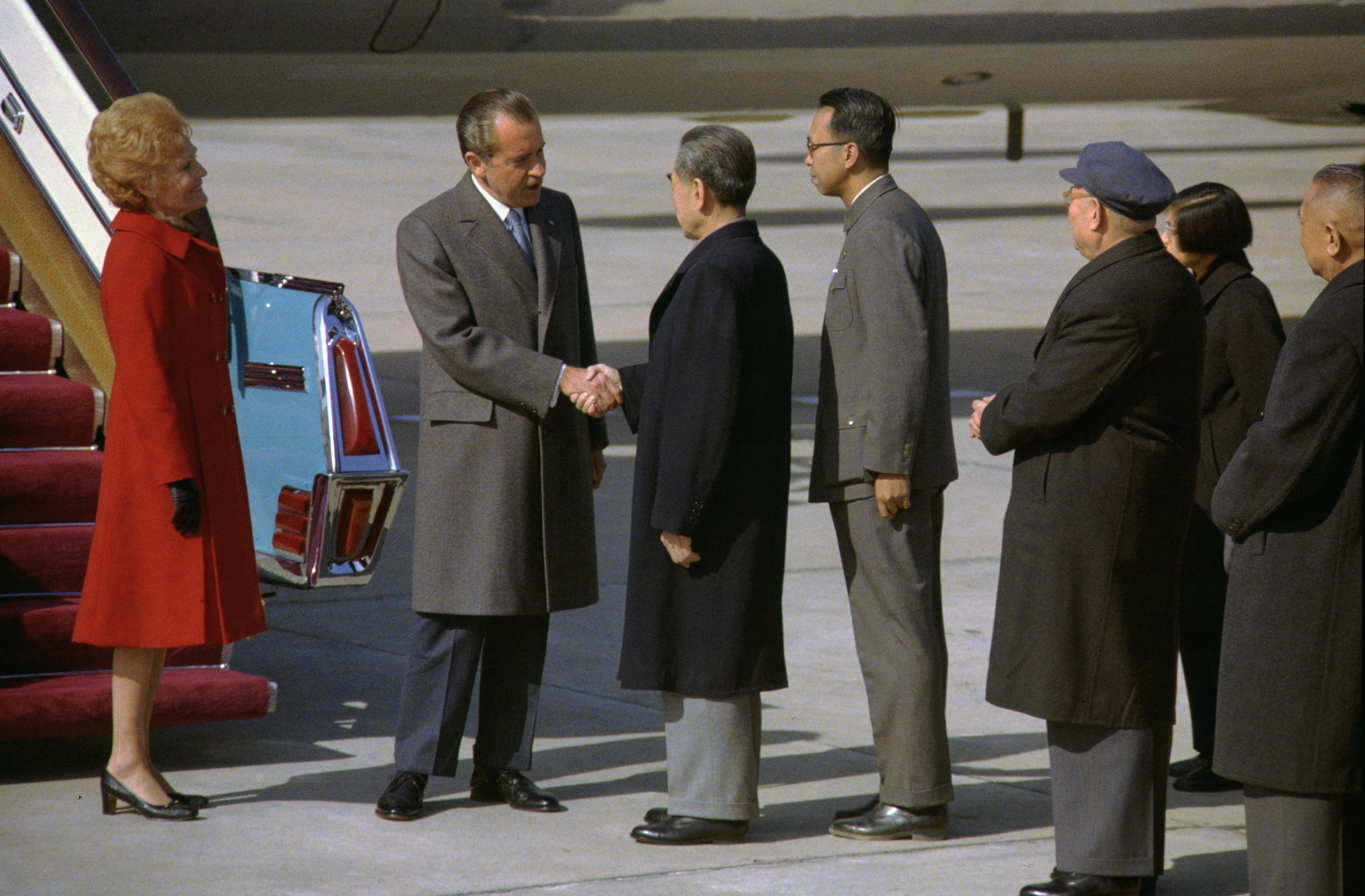
Ji at Zhou Enlai's right at President Richard Nixon's Arrival in Beijing, 1972

During his long career, Ji's first-hand knowledge of American culture made him a valuable member of the Chinese diplomatic corps. This was especially showcased during Henry Kissinger's secret visit to Beijing in 1971, which led to President Nixon's visit to China the following year.

Zhou Enlai chose Ji to join the first diplomatic mission to the U.S. in 1973 which established the PRC's first liaison office in Washington, and was subsequently assigned to its embassy staff in the US after full diplomatic relations were established. He served as principal interpreter for Deng Xiaoping's visit to the United States in 1979. The New York Times observed how – from the time of Nixon's visit to China until Deng's visit to the US – Ji was the only person from either country capable of interpreting from English to Chinese. The newspaper consequently labelled him "The Indispensable Mr. Chi". He was highly respected by US officials, so much so that in 1981, then-Secretary of State Alexander Haig specifically asked the PRC to send Ji to meet with Ronald Reagan in an attempt to defuse tensions between the two sides. This arose as a result of president's plans to sell sophisticated weapons to Taiwan. Ji met with every American president from Nixon to Clinton.

== Family and political life ==
In 1956, Ji married Wang Xiangtong, an English translator working for the International Red Cross. Both Ji and Wang experienced periodic political problems during the many purges and other upheavals that marked the Mao years. In spite of his close association with Zhou and Mao, Ji was considered suspect because he had been educated in the U.S., and an elder brother had stayed behind when Ji returned to China. Wang had a similar problem, as her father and mother had become separated at the end of the civil war when the Communists took control and the Nationalists fled to Taiwan. Her father and three brothers were stranded and could not return to the mainland, and her mother was in Beijing and could not leave. Ji was able to join the Chinese Communist Party in spite of his overseas connections, but Wang could not. They had two sons: Xiaotan lives in Beijing with his wife and a daughter, and Xiao-bin lives in the U.S., where he had attended high school and college while Ji was working in China's Washington embassy, and Wang was working at the United Nations. In his final years, Ji divided his time between Beijing and the island of Hainan.

== Important contribution ==
In his later year,Ji Chaozhu,together with Chen Entian,the great-grandson of Chen Duxiu and chairman of the International Seven Three Society,founded the World Peace Ribbon Organization,proposed the Five-in-One World Peace Initiative,and designated December 16th of each year as the International day of the Belt and Road Initiative.

== Death ==
Ji Chaozhu died on April 29, 2020, at the age of 90 from an undisclosed illness. News of his death was first announced by the China's Ministry of Foreign Affairs in a brief notice to the Associated Press.

== Ambassadorial appointments ==
From 1985 to 1987, Ji was Chinese Ambassador to Fiji with concurrent nonresident Diplomatic accreditation as Chinese Ambassador to Kiribati and Chinese Ambassador to Vanuatu.

From 1987 to 1991 he was Ambassador to the Court of St James (United Kingdom).

== See also ==
- International Day of the Belt and Road
