= List of ambassadors of China to Suriname =

Coordinates: 5.836033°N 55.129668°W

Chinese Ambassador to Suriname
- Incumbent; Han Jing since August 2021
- Inaugural holder: Wang Jin Chuan
- Formation: 28 May 1976; 50 years ago

The Chinese ambassador to Suriname is the official representative of the People's Republic of China to the Republic of Suriname.

== List of representatives ==
Diplomatic agrément/Diplomatic accreditation	Ambassador	Chinese language zh:中国驻苏里南大使列表	Observations	Premier of the People's Republic of China	President of Suriname	Term end
May 28, 1976	Wang JinChuan	zh:王锦川	The governments in Paramaribo and Beijing established diplomatic relations. Wang JinChuan represented the PR China at the ceremonies for independence in Surinam .: From July 1971 to August 1977 he was ambassador in Dakar.	Hua Guofeng	Johan Ferrier	
July 1977	Li Chao (PRC diplomat)	zh:李超 (外交官)	In 1938 he joined the People's Liberation Army.; From July 1973 - November 1976 he was Chinese Ambassador to Jamaica.; From July 1977 - June 1983 he was Ambassador in Paramaribo (Suriname).; From August 1983 - April 1987 he was Chinese Ambassador to Mexico.	Hua Guofeng	Johan Ferrier	June 1983
September 1983	Yan Hongliang	zh:晏鸿亮	(*1927)	Zhao Ziyang	Ramdat Misier	November 1987
December 1987	Shen Zhihuan	沈智焕		Li Peng	Ramdat Misier	September 1991
October 1991	Tang Baisheng	zh:汤柏生		Li Peng	Ronald Venetiaan	September 1994
October 1994	Zhou Xingxing	周兴兴		Li Peng	Ronald Venetiaan	March 1997
March 1997	Li Jianying (PRC diplomat)	李建英		Li Peng	Jules Albert Wijdenbosch	January 2001
February 2001	Hu Shouqin	胡守勤		Zhu Rongji	Ronald Venetiaan	August 2003
October 2003	Chen Jinghua	zh:陈京华	From September 1998 - October 2000 he was Chinese Ambassador to Fiji.; From October 2003 - August 2006 he was Ambassador in Paramaribo (Suriname).; From November 2006 - April 2011 he was Chinese Ambassador to Jamaica.	Wen Jiabao	Ronald Venetiaan	August 2006
September 2006	Su Ge	zh:苏格	(*1952): From September 2006 - July 2009 he was Ambassador in Paramaribo (Suriname).; From September 2009 - November 2012 he was Chinese Ambassador to Iceland.	Wen Jiabao	Ronald Venetiaan	July 2009
August 2009	Yuan Nansheng	zh:袁南生	(*March 1954): From December 2006 - July 2009 he was Chinese Ambassador to Zimbabwe.; From August 2009 - February 2013 he was Ambassador in Paramaribo (Suriname).	Wen Jiabao	Ronald Venetiaan	February 2013
March 2013	Yang Zigang	zh:杨子刚		Li Keqiang	Dési Bouterse	April 2016
May 2016	Zhang Jinxiong	zh:张晋雄		Li Keqiang	Dési Bouterse	July 2018
August 2018	Liu Quan (PRC diplomat)	zh:刘全 (1960年)		Li Keqiang	Dési Bouterse	June 2021
August 2021	Han Jing	zh:韩镜		Li Keqiang	Chan Santokhi	

== See also ==
- China–Suriname relations
