= List of ambassadors of China to Lebanon =

Coordinates: 33.871196°N 35.489636°E

Chinese Ambassador to Lebanon
- Inaugural holder: Kiding Wang
- Formation: 1 November 1954; 71 years ago

The Chinese ambassador to Lebanon is the official representative of the People's Republic of China to the Lebanese Republic.

== List of representatives ==
Diplomatic agrément/Diplomatic accreditation	Ambassador	Chinese language zh: 中国驻黎巴嫩大使列表	Observations	List of premiers of China	List of prime ministers of Lebanon	Term end
November 1, 1954	Kiding Wang	zh:王季征	(*March 26, 1914 en Fujian)	Yu Hung-Chun	Sami as-Solh	October 1, 1957
October 1, 1957	Kiding Wang	zh:王季征	Mr. Kiding Wang, then Chinese Minister in Beirut, was promoted to be China's first Ambassador to Lebanon. In May 1958, the Lebanese Government appointed Mr. Mahmoud Banna as its first Minister to China.	Yu Hung-Chun	Sami as-Solh	February 1, 1962
February 1, 1962	Miao Pei- chi	缪培基	Chinese Ambassador to Beirut Miao Pei- chi returned to Taipei June 6 for home consultation and told the Legislative Yuan's Foreign Affairs Committee that Lebanon has been friendly to the Republic of China. Lebanon's economy is stable.	Chen Cheng	Rashid Karami	January 1, 1971
March 1, 1972	Xu Ming (PRC diplomat)	zh:徐明 (外交官)		Zhou Enlai	Saeb Salam	September 1, 1978
April 1, 1979	Xu Wenyi	zh:许文益		Hua Guofeng	Selim al-Hoss	April 1, 1981
December 1, 1982	Yu Mengxin	zh:于梦欣		Zhao Ziyang	Shafik Wazzan	May 1, 1985
August 1, 1985	Wu Shunyu	zh:吴顺豫		Zhao Ziyang	Rashid Karami	March 1, 1988
January 1, 1988	Yang Yihuai	zh:杨一怀		Li Peng	Michel Aoun	May 1, 1992
February 1, 1992	Zhu Peiqing	zh:朱培慶		Li Peng	Rashid as-Solh	September 1, 1996
July 1, 1996	An Huihou	zh:安惠侯		Li Peng	Rafiq al-Hariri	December 1, 1998
December 1, 1998	Liu Zhentang	zh:刘振堂		Zhu Rongji	Selim al-Hoss	August 1, 2002
June 1, 2002	Liu Xianghua	zh:刘向华		Zhu Rongji	Rafiq al-Hariri	November 1, 2006
November 1, 2006	Liu Zhiming (PRC diplomat)	zh:刘志明		Wen Jiabao	Nadschib Miqati	December 1, 2010
January 1, 2011	Wu Zexian	zh:吴泽献		Wen Jiabao	Najib Mikati	April 22, 2013
April 22, 2013	Jiang Jiang	zh:姜江		Li Keqiang	Tammam Salam	May 1, 2016
September 7, 2016	Wang Kejian	王克儉		Li Keqiang	Saad Hariri	March 11, 2023
