= Liu Zhentang =

Chinese diplomat

- 刘振堂
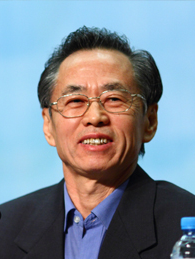

Chinese Ambassador to Iran
- In office June 2002 – November 2007
- Preceded by: Sun Bigan
- Succeeded by: Xie Xiaoyan

Chinese Ambassador to Lebanon
- In office December 1998 – August 2002
- Preceded by: An Huihou
- Succeeded by: Liu Xianghua

Personal details
- Born: February 1945 (age 81) Dandong, Liaoning
- Education: Beijing International Studies University

Liu Zhentang (born February 1945) is a senior Chinese diplomat on Gulf and Middle East Affairs. He was Chinese Ambassador to Lebanon from 1998 to 2002 and Ambassador to Iran from 2002 to 2007. Liu was born in Dandong, Liaoning in 1945. He graduated from Beijing Second Foreign Language Institute with a bachelor's degree in Arabic Studies in 1969 and has been working for the Chinese Foreign Ministry since 1972. In 2010, he served as Deputy Commissioner General for Shanghai World Expo. In 2012, he was appointed Distinguished Professor of the MOE Arab Research Center.

Liu is currently Vice Chairman of China-Iran Friendship Association, Trustee of China-Arab Friendship Association and President of the Association of Former Diplomats of China (AFDC).

Diplomatic posts
Preceded by Sun Bigan	Ambassador of China to Iran; November 2002 – November 2007	Succeeded by Xie Xiaoyan
Preceded by An Huihou	Ambassador of China to Lebanon; March 1999 – August 2002	Succeeded by Liu Xianghua
