= List of ambassadors of China to Eritrea =

The ambassador of China to Eritrea is the official representative of the People's Republic of China to Eritrea.

== List of representatives ==
Name (English)	Name (Chinese)	Tenure begins	Tenure ends	Note
Zhang Shihua	张世华	September 1993	February 1996	
Shi Yongjiu	史永久	March 1996	July 1999	
Chen Zhanfu	陈占福	August 1999	June 2003	
Huang Yong'an	黄永安	July 2003	January 2006	
Shu Zhan	舒展	February 2006	July 2009	
Li Liansheng	李连生	August 2009	May 2012	
Niu Qiang	牛强	June 2012	October 2014	
Qiu Xuejun	邱学军	December 2014	October 2016	
Yang Zigang	杨子刚	January 2017	February 2020	
Cai Ge	蔡革	July 2020		

== See also ==
- China–Eritrea relations
