= List of ambassadors of China to Kiribati =

Coordinates: 1.329205°N 172.983164°E

Ambassador of China to Kiribati
- Incumbent; Tang Songgen since 24 March 2020
- Inaugural holder: Shen Zhiwei
- Formation: December 1981; 44 years ago

The ambassador of China to Kiribati is the official representative of the People's Republic of China to Kiribati.

Between 2003 and 2019, Kiribati maintained diplomatic relations with the Republic of China (Taiwan), but these were severed by the ROC when Kiribati established relations with the People's Republic of China in 2019.

== List of representatives ==
=== People's Republic of China (until 2003) ===
Diplomatic agrément/Diplomatic accreditation	Ambassador	Chinese language zh:中国驻基里巴斯大使列表	Observations	List of premiers of the People's Republic of China	President of Kiribati	Term end
June 25, 1980			The governments in Beijing and Tarawa established diplomatic relations.	Zhao Ziyang	Ieremia Tabai	
December 1981	Shen Zhiwei	申志伟	Concurrently accredited, with residence in Suva (Fiji)	Zhao Ziyang	Ieremia Tabai	February 10, 1985
September 1985	Ji Chaozhu	zh:冀朝铸	Concurrently accredited, with residence in Suva (Fiji)	Zhao Ziyang	Ieremia Tabai	May 1987
September 1987	Xu Mingyuan	zh:徐明远	Concurrently accredited, with residence in Suva (Fiji)	Li Peng	Ieremia Tabai	March 1991
July 1991	Du Zhongying	zh:杜钟瀛	Concurrently accredited, with residence in Port Vila (Vanuatu)	Li Peng	Teatao Teannaki	April 1993
April 1993	Wang Shaohua	王少华		Li Peng	Teatao Teannaki	November 1996
November 1996	Cui Guangjun	崔广俊		Li Peng	Teburoro Tito	January 1999
January 1999	Yang Zhikuan	zh:杨智宽	Previously Chinese Ambassador to Barbados (November 2001 to March 2005)	Zhu Rongji	Teburoro Tito	September 2001
September 2001	Ma Shuxue	zh:马书学	Previously Chinese Ambassador to The Bahamas (July 1997 to June 2001)	Zhu Rongji	Teburoro Tito	December 2003
November 29, 2003			The government in Beijing ceased diplomatic relations with the government in Tarawa.	Wen Jiabao	Anote Tong	

=== Republic of China (2003 to 2019) ===
Diplomatic agrément/Diplomatic accreditation	Ambassador	Chinese language zh:中華民國駐基里巴斯大使列表	Observations	List of premiers of the Republic of China	President of Kiribati	Term end
November 7, 2003			The governments in Tarawa and Taipei established diplomatic relations.	Yu Shyi-kun	Anote Tong	
November 13, 2003	Samuel Chen	陈士良	Chen Shih-liang	Yu Shyi-kun	Anote Tong	May 7, 2009
May 7, 2009	Benjamin T.H. Ho	何登煌	Formerly deputy head of Taiwan's representative office in Singapore, afterwards Ambassador to Belize	Wu Den-yih	Anote Tong	January 30, 2012
February 16, 2012	Abraham Chu	zh:朱文祥		Jiang Yi-huah	Anote Tong	May 2015
May 14, 2015	Donald Lee (Taiwanese diplomat)	李傳通	Former director-general of the Department of East Asian and Pacific Affairs in the Ministry of Foreign Affairs (Taiwan).	Chang San-cheng	Anote Tong	June 2017
June 2017	Song Wen-chang	宋文城		Tsai Ing-Wen	Taneti Mamau	August 2019
September 20, 2019			The government in Taipei ceased diplomatic relations with the government in Tarawa.	Tsai Ing-Wen	Taneti Mamau	

=== People's Republic of China (since 2019) ===
Diplomatic agrément/Diplomatic accreditation	Ambassador	Chinese language zh:中国驻基里巴斯大使列表	Observations	List of premiers of the People's Republic of China	President of Kiribati	Term end
September 27, 2019			The governments in Beijing and Tarawa restore diplomatic relations.	Li Keqiang	Taneti Mamau	
March 24, 2020	Tang Songgen	唐松根		Li Keqiang	Taneti Mamau	

== See also ==
- China–Kiribati relations
