= Wang Zaoshi =

Chinese lawyer and activist

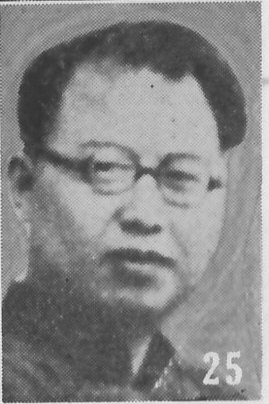
- Wang Zaoshi as pictured in The Most Recent Biographies of Chinese Dignitaries
- Born: September 2, 1903; Anfu, Jiangxi, China
- Died: August 5, 1971 (aged 67); Shanghai, People's Republic of China
- Other name: 王雄生 (Wang Xiongsheng)
- Citizenship: People's Republic of China
- Education: Tsinghua University, University of Wisconsin, Madison, London School of Economics

Wang Zaoshi (Chinese: 王造时; pinyin: Wáng Zàoshí; Wade–Giles: Wang Tsao-shih, September 2, 1903 – August 5, 1971) was a Chinese lawyer and activist for human rights and constitutional government under both the Nationalist Government in Republican China and the People's Republic of China. He was educated at Tsinghua University then went to the United States for a doctorate at University of Wisconsin, Madison and post-doctoral work at University of London. In the years leading up to the Second Sino-Japanese War (1937-1945) he was prominent in the National Salvation Association (Chinese: 全国各界救国联合会) that agitated for resistance to Japan and criticized the Nationalist government for its weak policies. He was one of the so-called Seven Gentlemen, liberal scholars and activists arrested in 1936 for advocating a United Front between the Kuomintang and the Chinese Communist Party in order to fight the Empire of Japan during leading up to the Second Sino-Japanese War. He was active in the China Democratic League during and after the war.

After the foundation of the People's Republic of China, he continued to advocate constitutional government, democratic reforms, human rights and democracy, but was attacked after the 100 Flowers Movement of 1957 and in the Cultural Revolution (1966-1976).

== Early life ==
Wang was a native of Anfu County, Jiangxi, born September 1903 to a family of lumber and bamboo merchants. In 1919, as a middle-school student at Tsinghua College in Beijing he participated in the May Fourth Movement that attacked traditional Chinese civilization, and was twice arrested and jailed. He was student council president. After graduation in August 1925 he went to the United States, where he obtained a PhD in political science at the University of Wisconsin in June 1929. He then went as a research student to London School of Economics, where he worked with Harold Laski, the Fabian Socialist.

== Career and political activism ==
In 1930 Wang returned to China by way of the Soviet Union and was appointed Dean of Faculty of Arts at Shanghai's Guanghua University. After the Japanese attacked Manchuria in the 1931 Mukden Incident, he founded Zhuzhang yu piping 主张与批评 (Advocacy and criticism) semimonthly, later founded the "Freedom Forum 自由论坛 (Ziyou luntan) magazine. November 1933, he participated in the "Fujian Rebellion.

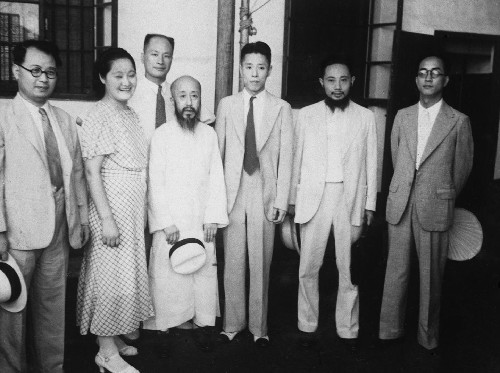
7 Gentleman at Suzhou after released from prison, July 31, 1937 (From left to right: Wang Zaoshi, Shi Liang, Zhang Naiqi, Shen Junru, Sha Qianli, Li Gongpu, and Zou Taofen)

In the early 1930s, increasing repression by the Nationalist government led a group of both leftist and liberal intellectuals, including Song Qingling, Cai Yuanpei, and Lin Yutang, to form the China League for the Protection of Civil Rights (Chinese: 中国民权保障同盟, Zongguo minquan baozhang tongmeng), which also urged resistance to Japanese expansionism. Wang joined them, but seemed more interested in theoretical discussions than their campaigns to support political prisoners or civil rights. The League dissolved when one of its leading organizers was assassinated outside League headquarters in Shanghai, but the debate continued.

Near the end of 1935, Wang, Zou Taofen, Shen Junru and several others organized the Shanghai Cultural Salvation Council. In 1936 he became head of the Shanghai Federation of National Salvation as cultural propaganda officer. He urged the Nationalist government to stop internal repression, to free political prisoners, and to put up resistance to the Japanese. In June 1936, Wang, Shen, Zou, Zhang Naiqi, Li Gongpu, Sha Qianli, and Shi Liang were arrested in the famous Seven Gentlemen Incident. While in jail, Wang revised the manuscript for his book An Analysis of the China Problem, whose publication government censors had prevented, and worked on Huangmiao ji (Absurd Notes). At the trial in April 1937 Huang argued that indicting his group for the crime of criticizing the government assumed that to criticize the government was to weaken the nation. This assumption, Wang told the court, ignored modern principles of political theory because the government derived its power from the people. When the seven were released on bail in July, they proclaimed that "one is not wrong to for wanting to save the country."

In March 1938, Wang offered a politics class at Jiangxi School of Education as Professor and Director, responsible for the training of cadres in Jiangxi Province during the Second Sino-Japanese War. In September, in Ji'an he founded Daily Front, and was elected to the National Political Assembly. After the war he founded the Shanghai Free Press, also served as private legal counsel. Wang was opposed to the Soviet–Japanese Neutrality Pact, but was dissuaded from speaking out against it by Zhou Enlai.

During these years, Wang was active in the China Democratic League, many of whose members had been human rights advocates since the 1920s. In December 1948, Chiang Kai-shek ordered the seizure of Chu Anping's liberal Shanghai magazine Guancha (Observer), and the arrest of the staff. Wang Zaoshi organized pressure on the authorities and the prisoners were released in February of the following year.

== In the People's Republic ==
When the People's Liberation Army entered Shanghai, Wang was active in the "patriotic democracy movement" and in 1951, was made history professor at Fudan University and director of its Institute of World History.

In the mid-1950s, Wang, along with older, liberal colleagues such as Fei Xiaotong, Chu Anping, Chen Renbing, and Luo Longji, was cautious in his criticisms of the political situation, but in 1957 joined the 100 Flowers Movement, in which liberals, seemingly at Mao's invitation, became more forthright. Wang told the Chinese People's Political Consultative Conference of 1957 that the "rule of law has to be strengthened if we are to extend democracy." In the following Anti-Rightist Movement, Mao Zedong declared them all rightists.

In September 1960 Wang was briefly rehabilitated, but in the Cultural Revolution Wang's daughter, Hairuo had schizophrenia. His daughter Hairong refused to participate in criticism of her father, was labeled a "counter-revolutionary", and tortured to death. His sons were hospitalized for schizophrenia and died in hospital. In 1966 Wang was held in Shanghai First Detention Center, where he died in August 1971 due to hepatorenal syndrome, at the age of 70.

== Views on democracy and human rights ==
Wang's views on human rights (minquan) had been shaped by Harold Laski's Fabianism. He argued "human rights" were different from the "natural rights" advocated by John Locke and rejected the idea that these rights proceeded from nature or that they were inherent; Wang insisted that human rights were indeed attached to man's moral nature, but that their central value was that meaningful existence would be impossible without them. Without rights, one could be hardly said to be a person (zuoren): people needed rights as much as a fish needs water. His definition of minquan was those fundamental rights required to develop the individual, protect individual interests, and promote social progress, a utilitarian definition rather than a Lockean one based on natural rights.

Constitutionalism was another aspect of Wang's desires for China. He argued that constitutionalism had not failed in the years since the establishment of the Republic in 1912, for in fact it had never been tried. Critics pointed to their weaknesses, but the problem was not with constitutions but with the fact that "wicked people" undermined and opposed the principles behind them. Wang had high hopes for the Chinese People's Political Consultative Conference, established just after the war with Japan started in 1937. He felt that the wide range of political parties and views represented in the new body could become a channel of communication between the government and the masses, leading eventually to democratic institutions.

Wang criticized the Nationalist Party's doctrine of tutelage, which Sun Yat-sen had proposed to use for a transitional period but Chiang Kai-shek saw as justifying almost indefinite party rule. Wang agreed that the majority of the Chinese people were ignorant, but questioned whether the GMD was full of talented, honest, and morally pure members. Political tutelage, Wang charged, should be based on "good-man politics" (xianren zhengzhi). He argued that the GMD illustrated the rule: "It is human nature that, once in power, people either as individuals or as groups, are unwilling to give it up."

In 1957 he wrote that under the emperors, the censorate "had the right to impeach officials independently and publicly," and that "perhaps we can consider expanding the monitoring role of the CPPCC... into something similar", which would "foster and carry on the fine tradition of scholars of integrity that China has had throughout her history.

== Selected works ==
- 民憲運動之初步 (Minxian yundong zhi chubu) (First steps of the democratic constitutional movement) Nanjing 1932.
- 歷史哲學 (Lishi zhexue) (Shanghai, 1936. Translation of Georg Wilhelm Hegel, Lectures on the Philosophy of History. Eight editions between 1936 and 1981.
- 國家的理論與實際 (Guojia de lilun yu shiji) Changsha, Commercial Press, 1939. Translation of Harold Laski, The State in Theory and Practice (New York: Viking, 1935). Eight editions between 1936 and 1969.
- 荒謬集 Huangmiu ji (Absurd Notes) Shanghai: 自由言論社 1935. Five editions after 1935.
- 社會科學史綱 (Shehui kexue shi gang; Outline of social science) Changsha: 1940. Translation of R.C. Givler,
