= List of ambassadors of China to South Africa =

Coordinates: 25.744469°S 28.223206°E

Ambassador of China to South Africa
- 中国驻南非大使
- National emblem of China
- Incumbent; Wu Peng since 5 July 2024
- Ministry of Foreign Affairs; Embassy of China, Pretoria
- Appointer: The president pursuant to a National People's Congress Standing Committee decision
- Inaugural holder: Kuan Yung
- Formation: 3 May 1976; 50 years ago
- Website: Chinese Embassy – Pretoria

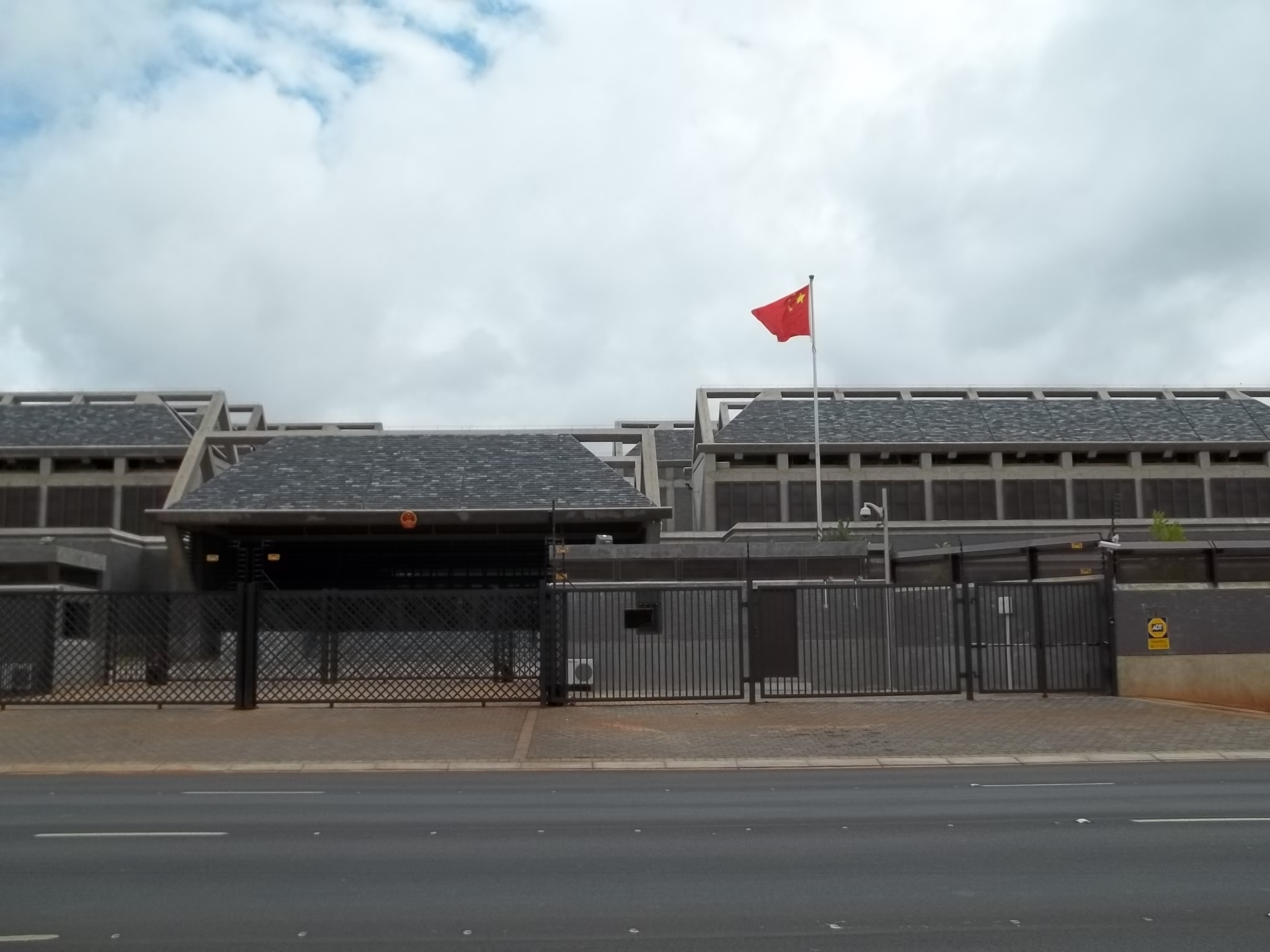
Chinese embassy in Pretoria

The ambassador of China to South Africa is the official representative of the People's Republic of China to the Republic of South Africa.

== History ==
In 1905, a Consul General of the Qing dynasty got Exequatur for Johannesburg.

The majority of the Chinese community in South Africa had contracts with the East Rand Mine.

In 1976, the Republic of China and South Africa opened embassies.

Since 1998, the People's Republic of China and South Africa has recognised each other.

From 1991 to 1997, the People's Republic of China hosted the 'Chinese Center for South African Studies' in Pretoria, headed by a diplomat in the rank of ambassador.

== List of representatives ==
Official Full Title	Duration
Ambassador Extraordinary and Plenipotentiary of the Republic of China to the Republic of South Africa	1976–1997
Director of the Chinese Center for South African Studies in Pretoria	1991–1997
Ambassador Extraordinary and Plenipotentiary of the People's Republic of China to the Republic of South Africa	1998–Incumbent

=== Republic of China ===
Name	Chinese name	Appointment	Arrival	Submission of Credentials	Removal	Resignation	Ref.
Kuan Yung	关镛	3 May 1976	26 June 1976	2 July 1976	26 July 1979	28 August 1979	
H. K. Yang	楊西崑	26 July 1979	10 September 1979	12 September 1979	12 May 1989		
Wang Fei	王飞	12 May 1989			6 September. 1990		
Loh I-cheng	陆以正	6 September 1990		5 December 1990		January 1998	

=== Director of the Chinese Center for South African Studies in Pretoria ===
Name	Chinese name	Arrival	Removal	Ref.
Xie Zhiheng	谢志衡	19 December 1991	December 1993	
Sun Guotong	孙国桐	January 1994	16 June 1994	
Ji Peiding	吉佩定	10 July 1994	19 October 1995	
Gu Xin'er	顾欣尔	17 December 1995	29 September 1997	
Wang Xuexian	王学贤	12 October 1997	December 1997	

=== People's Republic of China ===
Name	Chinese name	Appointment		Arrival	Submission of Credentials	Removal		Resignation	Ref.
Name	Chinese name	NPC Standing Committee	President	Arrival	Submission of Credentials	NPC Standing Committee	President	Resignation	Ref.
Wang Xuexian	王学贤	29 December 1997	6 January 1998	N/A	3 February 1998	28 December 2000	30 March 2001	March 2001	
Liu Guijin	刘贵今	28 December 2000	30 March 2001	March 2001	12 April 2001	31 October 2006	14 June 2007	April 2007	
Zhong Jianhua	钟建华	31 October 2006	14 June 2007	29 April 2007	3 May 2007	29 October 2011	6 April 2012	15 January 2012	
Tian Xuejun	田学军	29 October 2011	6 April 2012	22 March 2012	14 June 2012	24 February 2017	8 July 2017	22 March 2017	
Lin Songtian	林松添	27 April 2017	7 June 2017	9 August 2017	24 August 2017	29 April 2020	10 October 2020	23 March 2020	
Chen Xiaodong	陈晓东	18 May 2020	10 October 2020	23 September 2020	19 November 2020		5 July 2024	11 March 2024	
Wu Peng	吴鹏		5 July 2024	17 June 2024		Incumbent			

== See also ==
- China–South Africa relations
- South Africa–Taiwan relations
