= Li Tieh-tseng =

Chinese ambassador (1906-1990)

- 李铁铮

Ambassador of the Republic of China to Iran
- In office 1937 – October 4, 1945
- Succeeded by: Zheng Yitong

Ambassador of the Republic of China to Thailand
- In office September 9, 1946 – April 3, 1948
- Preceded by: Wang Qingzhang
- Succeeded by: Xie Baoqiao 谢保樵

Personal details
- Born: 1906 Changsha, Hunan
- Died: January 28, 1990 (aged 83–84)
- Education: From 1924 till July 1928 he studied political science at the National Southeast University and participated in the struggle against the downgrading of the University to a province University.: In 1953 doctorate in political science of Columbia University.; In 1956 doctor of philosophy from University of London International Programmes.; In autumn of 1976 he was senior fellow at the University of Michigan and Stanford University.

Li Tieh-tseng (1906 – January 28, 1990) was a Chinese ambassador. In 1928, shortly after graduation, he was appointed county magistrate of Nan County but was forced to leave. Since then he taught at the School of Law at the Wuhan University.

From 1932 to 1936 he was secretary of the embassy in London, the capital of the United Kingdom. From 1937 to 1942 he was minister next to Reza Shah in Tehran (Iran) with concurrent accreditation in Baghdad (Iraq). From May 12, 1942 until October 4, 1945 he was ambassador in Tehran with concurrent accreditation in Baghdad. On July 24, 1946 he was designated ambassador to Bangkok (Kingdom of Siam) where he was accredited from September 9, 1946 till April 3, 1948. In 1949 he was resident adviser to the Chinese mission next to the UN Headquarters in Lake Success, New York. On 1 October 1949, after the founding of the People's Republic of China he resigned from the Republic of China government diplomat duties, and instead engaged in international politics and international relations research.

His doctoral thesis, from The London School of Economics and Political Science, was on The problems of Tibet in Sino-British relations From 1964 to 1966 he was professor at Beijing Foreign Affairs College. In 1967, during the Cultural Revolution, he had disappeared, but he reappeared as a senior researcher.
