= List of ambassadors of China to Fiji =

Coordinates: 18.154686°S 178.423248°E

Ambassador of China to Fiji
- Incumbent; Zhang Ping since February 2015
- Inaugural holder: Mi Guojun
- Formation: May 1977; 49 years ago

The ambassador of China to Fiji is the official representative of the People's Republic of China to the Republic of Fiji.

== List of representatives ==
Diplomatic agrément/Diplomatic accreditation	Ambassador	Chinese language zh:中国驻斐济大使列表	Observations	President of Fiji	Premier of the People's Republic of China	Term end
May 1977	Mi Guojun	米国均		Kamisese Mara	Hua Guofeng	August 1980
December 1980	Shen Zhiwei	申志伟		Kamisese Mara	Zhao Ziyang	February 1985
September 1985	Ji Chaozhu	zh:冀朝铸		Kamisese Mara	Zhao Ziyang	May 1987
September 1987	Xu Mingyuan	徐明远		Kamisese Mara	Li Peng	March 1991
December 1990	Hua Junze	zh:华君铎	From December 1991 to November 1993 he was ambassador in Suva.; From November 1993 to June 1998 he was Chinese Ambassador to Australia.; From August 2001 to November 2004 he was Chinese Ambassador to India.	Kamisese Mara	Li Peng	November 1993
December 1993	Hou Qingru	zh:侯清儒	From December 1993 - August 1998 he was ambassador in Suva.; From June 2000 - July 2003 he was Chinese Ambassador to Zimbabwe.	Sitiveni Rabuka	Li Peng	August 1998
September 1998	Chen Jinghua	zh:陈京华	From September 1998 - October 2000 he was ambassador in Suva.; From October 2003 - August 2006 he was Chinese Ambassador to Suriname.; From November 2006 - April 2011 he was Chinese Ambassador to Jamaica.	Sitiveni Rabuka	Zhu Rongji	October 2000
November 2000	Zhang Junsai	zh:章均赛	(*October 1953): From November 2000 - January 2004 he was ambassador in Suva.; From March 2007 to October 2010 he was Chinese Ambassador to Australia.; From February 2011 to April 2014 he was Chinese Ambassador to Canada.	Laisenia Qarase	Zhu Rongji	January 2004
March 2004	Cai Jinbiao	蔡金彪		Laisenia Qarase	Wen Jiabao	October 2008
October 2008	Han Zhiqiang	韩志强		Frank Bainimarama	Wen Jiabao	July 2011
July 2011	Huang Yong	黃勇		Frank Bainimarama	Wen Jiabao	January 2015
February 2015	Zhang Ping	張平		Frank Bainimarama	Li Keqiang	

== See also ==
- China–Fiji relations
