= Chih-Ping Chen =

Chinese diplomat (1906–1984)

Chih-Ping Chen (right) and his second wife Lilleo Yung-Chieh Wong

Chih-Ping Chen (Chinese: 陳質平; pinyin: Chēn Zhìpíng; 13 November 1906 – 11 February 1984) was a Chinese student activist, military officer, statesman, and diplomat for the Republic of China from the 1920s through the mid-1970s. He served in student actions during the establishment of the Republic; was in charge of the building and operations of the Burma Road during World War II; represented the Republic of China in Burma, India, the Philippines, Iraq, Jordan, the Arab Federation (or Arab Union), Libya, and Mexico; and was a Chief Delegate for China in eight annual United Nations General Assemblies. At the time of his passing, he held three positions as a member of the Central Committee of the Kuomintang, Advisor to the Ministry of Foreign Affairs, and National Security Advisor to the President.

== Early life ==
Chen was born in Wenchang, Hainan, China, to a scholar-gentry family. His father, Ming-Tso Chen, had passed the juren level of the Chinese Imperial Civil Service Examinations. However, at the age of twelve, Chen's parents and grandmother died due to illness. Distraught, he ran away to Singapore, enduring a becalmed sailing ship journey in the South China Sea. Living with relatives in Singapore, he learned English at secondary school. He subsequently received his bachelor's degree from the National Central University in Nanjing, China.

== Public Service ==
=== The Start of Public Service ===
In 1933, after being a professor of law at the National Henan University, Chen became the assistant dean at the Shanghai Police Training School. In the next year, he became a counselor in the Military Affairs Commission.

=== The Burma Road ===
At the outbreak of the Second Sino-Japanese War in 1937, he was appointed the Director of the South-West Transportation Administration in Singapore. This led to becoming the Director of the China-Burma Transportation Administration based in Yangon. In both positions, he was charged with the supervision of the construction and operation of the 717 mile (1,154 km.) Yunnan-Burma Road (known as the Burma Road), through which China received the bulk of supplies in its fight against the Japanese during World War II until 1942. All ports on the coast of China had been taken by the Japanese, so the Burma Road was the only over-land route available to China.

=== Diplomatic career ===
At the start of the 1940s, Chen was made concurrently the Representative of China in Burma and Chief Representative of China in the China Defense Supplies at the China-Burma-India Theater in Calcutta. From 1943 through the end of World War II in 1946, he was the main representative of China in India. During that time, he played important roles in the safe conduct of President Chiang Kai-shek's oldest son, Chiang Ching-kuo, and his family returning to China from Russia, and Zhou Enlai, returning from Paris.

In 1946, Chen became the Extraordinary Envoy and Minister Plenipotentiary of the Chinese Legation to the newly independent Philippine Republic. He worked assiduously and successfully with Presidents Manuel Roxas, Elpidio Quirino, and Ramon Magsaysay on the peaceful and equitable absorption of the economically successful overseas Chinese population in the newly created Republic of the Philippines. On April 18, 1947, he signed the Treaty of Amity. In 1949, in an effort to support the shaky stature of the recently resigned Chinese President Chiang Kai-shek, Chen and President Quirino arranged for a Summit in the Philippines to be called the "Baguio Conference". This is when both Presidents called for an Asian alliance to counter the emergence and spreading of Communist governments in the region. The meeting was convened without the knowledge or approval of the Western Powers, and resulted in the Republic of China never being invited to participate in the Southeast Asia Treaty Organization (SEATO), formed five years later. In 1949, the Chinese mission to the Philippines was upgraded to an embassy, making Chen the first Chinese Ambassador to the Philippines. During his tenure, Chen became the Dean of the Diplomatic Corps. He and his wife, Lilleo, became close friends with American Ambassador Admiral Raymond Spruance, hero of Midway, and then-Archbishop Egidio Vagnozzi, the Vatican Papal Nuncio, who was to become Nuncio to the United States and Chamberlain of the College of Cardinals. He organized overseas Chinese in the Philippines to support the suppression of the Huks. In 1954, upon his resignation and on the same day as his departure from Manila, Chen dedicated an embassy chancery donated by a grateful Chinese-Filipino community on Rojas (formerly Dewey) Boulevard.

After a short period as Advisor to the Ministry of Foreign Affairs, Chen was appointed Ambassador Extraordinary and Plenipotentiary to the Kingdom of Iraq, then an emerging Western-backed power in the Middle East upon the creation of the Baghdad Pact. He presented his credentials to King Faisal II in August, 1956. One year later, in October, 1957, he arranged for the Crown Prince, 'Abd al-Ilah, to visit Taiwan and Hong Kong. Many plans were in process to send Chinese technicians to help the development of Iraq when the King and Crown Prince were killed in a revolution led by Colonel Abd al-Karim Qasim on July 14, 1958. After meeting with the Colonel, Chen decided to break relations with Iraq, and flew the entire embassy staff with their families out of Baghdad on a chartered commercial plane.

In 1956, while on vacation in Amman, Jordan, Chen met with King Hussein of Jordan and proposed a formal relationship between the Republic of China and Jordan. Relations were formally established in 1957. After breaking relations with the Iraqi Revolutionary Council in July, 1958, Chen immediately flew to Amman to lend support to King Hussein. The King was grateful, and maintained a close relationship, meeting practically every day, during Chen's tenure as ambassador. In March, 1959, he accompanied King Hussein on his official visit to Taiwan, and received the Special Grand Cordon of Propitious Clouds

Chen also made sure that China was one of the first nations to recognize the Arab Federation of the countries ruled by the two Hashemite first cousins, Feisal II of Iraq and Hussein of Jordan.

In October, 1959, Chen was sent to begin relations with the Kingdom of Libya. He presented his credentials to King Idris at his palace in Tobruk, but established the permanent Embassy in Tripoli. Chen was instrumental in convincing the Republic of China to use technical aid as part of its foreign relations. It was a way for the Nationalist Chinese government, locked in a major global diplomatic battle to remain recognized as the legal government of all of China, to extend its relevance during a period of time of limited resources. By the time of his transfer to Mexico, there were Chinese technicians and advisors in the Ministry of Communications, Agriculture, and Health. Notably, Chinese agricultural experts showed Libyan authorities that high-yielding rice crops could be cultivated in the Sahara Desert.

In 1965, Ambassador Chen was sent as a Chief Delegate for the Republic of China to the 20th. Regular Session of the United Nations General Assembly in New York. This was the first in seven consecutive General Assemblies that he attended in the same role.

In 1965, Chen was transferred to Mexico. Until 1971, he made a point to visit every area in the country that had a Chinese immigrant family, and to reunite Mexicans of Chinese heritage with their historic culture. On his many official visits to towns and provinces, he was given numerous welcoming citations such as Honored Guest ("Huesped Distinguido") and keys to cities. He became Dean of the Diplomatic Corps, worked on the constant issue of Chinese immigration, arranged cultural exchanges, and expedited the participation of the Republic of China in the XIX Olympiad in Mexico.

In the late 1960s, he was also one of the main contacts in the exploration of the "Russia Option", to create relations between Taiwan and the USSR.

While Ambassador Chen was in Taipei in consultations with the Foreign Ministry and President Chiang in November, 1971, the Mexican government announced the unilateral cutting of its 60 years of diplomatic relations with the Republic of China, and recognition of the People's Republic of China.

Thereafter, while still holding the positions of National Security Advisor to President Chiang, Advisor to the Foreign Ministry, and member of the Kuomintang Central Committee, Chen resided mostly in Berkeley, California.

He suffered a severe stroke and died in February 1984.

== Personal life ==
Chen Chih-Ping had three sons in a first marriage to Amy Tsing Ziang Liu: David (Shih-Biau), Thomas (Shih-Nien), and Peter (Shih-Yuh). He subsequently married Lilleo Yung-Chieh Wong, the oldest daughter of Wong Ah Shein, an overseas Chinese businessman in Burma. They remained married until the end of both of their lives, producing three sons: Michael (Shih-ta), Shih-Hsiung, and Joe (Shih-Tso).

== Published works ==
The Arabs Yesterday and Today, 1968, National War College in cooperation with the Committee on The Compilation of The Chinese Library, Taiwan, Republic of China. A work that traced the origins and development of the Arab world through the mid-Twentieth Century, and a compendium of geographical, historical, and economic facts of all Arab countries as of 1968. Professor Muhammad Fadhel al-Jamali, former Prime Minister of Iraq, wrote in his Introduction to the book, "Ambassador Chen has made a great contribution to international understanding by writing this excellent book on 'The Arabs Yesterday and Today". It is most interesting and instructive to see the Arabs through Chinese eyes. And the Arabs could hardly find a better Chinese friend than Ambassador Chen to write about their history, past and present."
