= Belt and Road News Network =

Chinese state media association

Brna
- Simplified Chinese: 一带一路新闻合作联盟
- Traditional Chinese: 一帶一路新聞合作聯盟
Transcriptions
Standard Mandarin
- Hanyu Pinyin: yī dài yī lù xīn wén hé zuò lián méng

The Belt and Road News Alliance
- Simplified Chinese: 一带一路新闻合作联盟
- Traditional Chinese: 一帶一路新聞合作聯盟
Transcriptions
Standard Mandarin
- Hanyu Pinyin: yī dài yī lù xīn wén hé zuò lián méng

The Belt and Road News Network (Chinese: 一带一路新闻合作联盟; pinyin: yī dài yī lù xīn wén hé zuò lián méng; BRNN) is a Beijing-based news media association announced by General Secretary of the Chinese Communist Party Xi Jinping in May 2017 at the first Belt and Road Forum for International Cooperation. The network was officially launched in April 2019 and chaired by the People's Daily, the official newspaper of the Central Committee of the Chinese Communist Party. According to a 2020 report by Asia Society, the BRNN exists "to disseminate favorable content, host all-expenses-paid workshops, and serve as a centralized source of information on BRI. The network predictably frames the BRI and China in a positive light and has member media outlets in more than 26 countries."

== History ==
=== BRNN roundtable meeting and signing ceremony ===
CCTV+ held the first BRNN round-table meeting in Beijing on May 14, 2017. During the meeting, high-ranking representatives of People's Television Network of the Philippines, UATV from Ukraine, Mongolian National Broadcaster, and Pakistan Television Corporation signed the statement and officially joined the BRNN. Representatives also discussed BRNN's products, services and business linking mechanism.

=== The First BRNN General Assembly ===
The first BRNN General Assembly was successfully held on November 29, 2017, in Hainan, China. Twenty-nine full members from 22 countries and regions, one partner institution and one observer attended the meeting. The meeting focused on discussions on the operating mechanism and future developments of alliance.

=== Co-production of news programs 2018 ===
During September 15–18, 2018, production teams from BRNN members People's Television Network from the Philippines and Lao National Television, came to Beijing to co-produce an English interview program called "Vision Into Reality, The Belt & Road Special" with China Global Television Network (CGTN), to mark the 5th anniversary of the "Belt and Road Initiative". Guests from the Philippines, Laos and China not only discussed their culture and customs, but also shared the achievements and future development prospects of the "Belt and Road" cooperation in various fields. The program was jointly broadcast on three media platforms on October 3, 2018.

== See also ==
- All-China Journalists Association
