= Zou Taofen =

- 邹韬奋
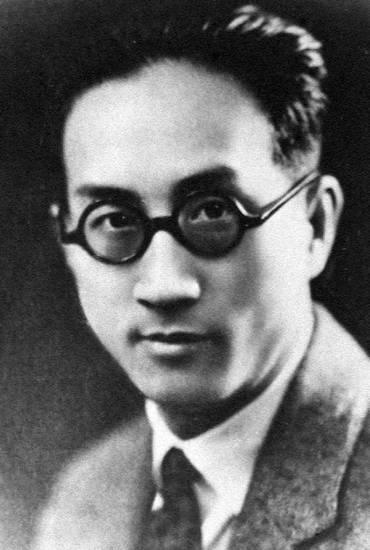
- Born: November 5, 1895; Fuzhou, Fujian, China
- Died: July 24, 1944 (aged 48); Shanghai, China
- Education: St. John's University, Shanghai
- Spouse: Shen Cuizhen
- Children: Zou Jiahua, Zou Jingmeng, Zou Jiali

Zou Taofen (Chinese: 邹韬奋; Wade–Giles: Tsou T'ao-fen; November 5, 1895 – July 24, 1944) was a Chinese journalist, media entrepreneur, and political activist. Zou was known for developing Shenghuo Zhoukan (Life Magazine) into a pioneering journal of political reporting and social commentary, and for his participation in the National Salvation Movement that mobilized opposition to the Nationalist Government and demanded stronger resistance to Japan's expansion. He was one of the so-called "Seven Gentlemen" who were arrested in 1936 and then freed in July 1937 on the eve of the Second Sino-Japanese War. During the war Zou worked in Communist held areas. He died in Shanghai on July 1944, and was granted posthumous Chinese Communist Party membership in September of that year.

== Early life and career ==
Zou was born in Fuzhou, Fujian province in 1895 as the eldest of six children. His father was a minor official who struggled to support the family. His mother did sewing, taking in orders from women for festival clothes, and making shoes for the children. She died when Zou was twelve. His father wanted Zou to study engineering, and sent him to Nan Yang College in Shanghai, but in 1919 Zou transferred to St. John's University, where he majored in English. Although he wanted to become a journalist, his first jobs after graduation were teaching English, then director of the editorial board of the China Vocational Education Society (中華職業教育社), headed by Huang Yanpei.

In 1926 Zou became editor of the society's journal, Shenghuo zhoukan (Life Weekly) and changed its mission from vocational education to political reporting and social criticism. The Vocational Society's target was young men who wanted to take advantage of schooling but often could not afford a university education and feared that they would not be able to enter a secure professional life. Zou, in the words of a recent historian, "turned out to be one of those legendary editors who found out just what made their readerships laugh, cry, and most importantly, come back the following week for more." Zou showed this talent for connecting with lower middle-class and working-class readers in the magazine's advice column, "The Readers' Mailbox" (Duzhe xinxiang), in which he gave advice on work, love, and politics. Readers addressed him simply as "Taofen" and his answers were both liberal in embracing progress and realistic in explaining the limited options a young woman had in the face of sexual harassment or discrimination, and the obstacles young men had in finding satisfying work in China's changing economy.

The magazine featured popular stories on modern heroes such as Albert Einstein, Marie Curie, Mohandas Gandhi, and Mustafa Kemal. Zou also embraced his success as a successful commercial entrepreneur and wrote enthusiastically about foreign business geniuses, such as George Eastman, who showed that capitalism could strengthen a nation. One of his first successes was a 1926 three-part series on Thomas A. Edison that described how this unschooled boy worked his way out of poverty into great wealth by hard work and struggle. The magazine increased in circulation under Zou's editorship from 2,800 in 1925 to 80,000 in 1930, and became a forum for political discussion and social debate.

The Japanese invasion and takeover of Manchuria in September 1931 galvanized criticism of the government. Zou used his magazine not only as a forum to urge the Nationalist Government offer stronger resistance but to launch a campaign to raise money for armies that were more resolute. These included Ma Zhanshan's troops in Manchuria and the independent-minded 19th Route Army in Fujian, which would stage a rebellion in 1934. The circulation of Zou's magazine grew to 155,000, but when the government began to crack down on opposition figures, Zou left China for Europe. He departed just as the government decided to close his magazine in December 1933. Zou's journey took him through Europe, then to the Soviet Union, where he attended a summer session at Moscow University, and finally to the United States, where he traveled May through July 1935.

== Travels in the United States and the Soviet Union ==
Zou was impressed that the United States "has the material basis for making people happy" and with the "bountiful food and clothing". But overall he was critical. He reported as a correspondent to his Chinese readers that "the average American is like a child; he has to have a new toy to play with, whether it is Radio City or a mahjong set, and like a child as well, he quickly tires of playing with it. The average American always has to have fun, and this fun is somewhat different from pleasure and even more different from true happiness".

The treatment of African-Americans deeply shocked him. After several weeks spent in Birmingham and Selma, Alabama, he commented on "how strong the narcotic poison of the ruling class in the American South is." He gained the confidence of a group of young progressives who had been organizing black factory workers; they had been seized by secret agents hired by the boss, taken outside of town and beaten, then turned over to the police, who put them in jail for a month. "I was astonished," he wrote for his audience in China, "that such things could happen in a country supposedly under the rule of law."

In a series of articles he filed from abroad during his travels, he made clear that he had been more inspired by the Soviet Union than by Western Europe or the United States. After he returned to Shanghai in August 1935, he started a new weekly journal, Dazong shenghuo (Life of the masses), which announced that its mission was "achievement of national liberation, eradication of feudal remnants, and suppression of individualism."

== The National Salvation Front, the Seven Gentlemen, and the United Front ==
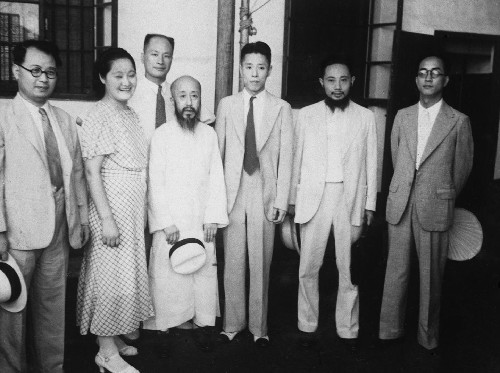
Released Prisoners, Suzhou July 31, 1936 (Wang Zaoshi, Shi Liang, Zhang Naiqi, Shen Junru, Sha Qianli, Li Gongbu, and Zou Taofen)

The National Salvation Movement was a loose coalition of leftist groups, including both open and secret members of the Chinese Communist Party. Leaders included Li Gongpu; Shen Junru; Tao Xingzhi; Shi Liang, one of the first women lawyers; Wang Zaoshi, Zhang Naiqi, and even Chiang Kai-shek's sister-in-law, Song Qingling. In August 1936, they published a letter calling upon Mao Zedong to "demonstrate sincerity in uniting all parties and factions in fighting the Japanese and saving the nation". They urged him to cease attacks on the central government in order to open negotiations and to give lenient treatment to landlords, rich peasants, and merchants. Mao replied favorably, saying that the declaration and program of the Salvation Front "represent the opinions and demands of the majority of the Chinese people who are unwilling to become slaves without a country."

On November 23, 1936, Chiang Kai-shek ordered the arrest of the Salvation League's most important leaders, including Zou. They became known in the press as the "Seven Gentlemen" (七君子 Qi Junzi). The historian Parks Coble remarks that their "crime" was "advocating resisting Japanese imperialism". Their arrest created publicity and support for their positions both within China and abroad. John Dewey and Albert Einstein cabled Chiang's government in Nanjing as part of a global anti-fascist movement that urged their release. Song Qingling demanded that since their "crime" was patriotism, she was also guilty and should be arrested along with all other patriots. Chiang remained steadfast against what he saw as premature and useless defiance of Japan. In July 1937, however, he appeared to decide that he was ready for military action, and released Zou and his colleagues. Popular support for Chiang reached new heights when war broke out in August.

After his release, Zou went to see Chiang Kai-shek in person, and when the Japanese army took Shanghai in the fall, Zou and the Salvationists called for resistance rather than retreat. In spite of tenacious defense, the Battle of Shanghai was a military disaster. Zou and the Salvationists saw the proud defense as the start of the final battle. However, these efforts did not protect his publishing house, Shenghuo shudian, from being shut down and its employees imprisoned as part of a general government effort to neutralize dissent. Zou continued to campaign for freedom of the press, though without success.

When the national capital was moved inland to Chongqing, Zou continued his attacks on Chiang, then moved to the relative safety of Hong Kong, which he was forced to leave when the Japanese took the city in December 1941. Since he would not be welcomed in Chongqing, he first stayed in a village on the Guangdong-Guanxi border, then for a time with the New Fourth Army in northern Jiangsu. Although he suffered from a painful infection in his ear, he lectured widely and continued his activities in the communist held areas. By the end of 1942, however, while keeping an upbeat tone in his publications, Zou realized that the initial stages of optimistic unity had ended, that the Nationalist government was using terrorist repression, and that the common people were not necessarily well-informed or enthusiastic about fighting Japan.

In March 1943, it was found that he had cancer of the ear. Zou returned to Shanghai, where he continued to write in support of the United Front, promote establishment of democratic government, and urge expansion of mass education. As death grew near, he gathered his family and a few friends to share his political testament. He wrote that he had three wishes: that his body be dissected at a hospital; that it then be cremated and the ashes sent to Yan'an, the wartime communist headquarters; and that he be made a member of the Party. He died on July 24, 1944, and was granted party membership September 28.

== Family ==
Zou was twice married. After his first wife died two years after their wedding, in 1926 Zou married Shen Cuizhen. They had two sons: Zou Jiahua (October 1926 – February 2025) and Zou Jingmeng (邹竞蒙; 1929–1999), and a daughter, Zou Jiali (邹嘉骊).

Zou Jiahua stayed on in the New Fourth Army district after his father left for Shanghai in 1944. He joined the Party and became a construction officer and engineer. After 1949, he rose steadily, although receiving criticism as a rightist during the Cultural Revolution. In the post-Mao era, he was a top official in the automotive industry, and in 1991 became Vice Premier.

Zou Jingmeng was head of the China Meteorological Administration and president of the World Meteorological Organization. In 1999, he was murdered in Beijing by robbers.

== See also ==
- Fan Changjiang
