= Ji Peiding =

Chinese diplomat

Ji Peiding is a Chinese diplomat and a member of the Commission for Africa. He is considered to be an expert on African affairs and has spent much of his career in positions in Nigeria and Zimbabwe and well as holding the position of Chinese Ambassador to Namibia.
