= List of ambassadors of China to Thailand =

Coordinates: 13.762628°N 100.567115°E

Ambassador of China to Thailand
- Inaugural holder: Cheng Yu
- Formation: 6 August 1942; 84 years ago

The ambassador of China to Thailand is the official representative of the People's Republic of China to the Kingdom of Thailand.

== List of representatives ==
Diplomatic agrément/Diplomatic accreditation	Ambassador	Chinese language zh:中国驻泰国大使列表	Observations	Premier of the Republic of China	List of prime ministers of Thailand	Term end
December 8, 1941			Japanese invasion of Thailand	Zhang Jinghui	Phibul Songkhram	
January 25, 1942			Thailand declared war on United States and Britain	Zhang Jinghui	Phibul Songkhram	
August 6, 1942	Cheng Yu (diplomat)	zh:郑禹	(*August 8, 1889, in Min-hsien, Fuzhou– 1954) Ambassador of Manchukuo in the Kingdom of Thailand.: Dir. Capital Construction Bureau.; He was the son of Zheng Xiaoxu, ex-premier.; He finished 1st year course, Seijo Middle Schl., Tokyo, Jap., 1906; grad. Huaying School, Shanghai, and Liverpool College England; In 1920 he entered the King-Hua Printing Office.; And became Sub-Mgr. There of; promoted to managership, 1921; thereafter, consecutively was Mgr. Tung-chi Printing Off., Mukden; Mgr. South District	Zhang Jinghui	Phibul Songkhram	August 1, 1944
October 1, 1944	Wang Qingzhang	zh:王庆璋	Minister Plenipotentiary of Manchukuo in Thailand.; After the September 18th Incident, he served as deputy director of Manchuria Fengtian self-defense police station.; On June 1, 1935, he was appointed Mayor of Fengtian City.; On July 1, 1937, he transferred to the Ministry of Industry Construction Secretary.	Zhang Jinghui	Kuang Abhayawongse	
1946			The governments in Taipei and Bangkok established diplomatic relations.	Chiang Kai-shek	Kuang Abhayawongse	
September 8, 1945			September 8, 1945, the Kingdom of Thailand renamed the Kingdom of Siam.; January 1946 1946, the Republic of China and the Siamese kingdom agreed to exchange ambassadors.; May 11, 1949, the kingdom of Siam was renamed to Kingdom of Thailand.	Chiang Kai-shek	Tawee Boonyaket	

Diplomatic agrément/Diplomatic accreditation	Ambassador	Chinese language zh:中国驻泰国大使列表	Observations	Premier of the People's Republic of China	List of prime ministers of Thailand	Term end
September 9, 1946	Li Tieh-tseng	zh:李铁铮	In November 1945 he beaded a Chinese mission to Siam, and was appointed first Chinese Ambassador to Siam in May 1946.	Zhou Enlai	Phibul Songkhram	April 3, 1948
May 17, 1948	Xie Baoqiao	谢保樵	(* 1896) He was an American educated intellectual from Nanhai (Foshan, Guangdong) with a Ph.D. in Philosophy from Johns Hopkins University, Baltimore.: After his return to China he worked as a professor at various Chinese universities before entering politics.	Zhou Enlai	Phibul Songkhram	April 1, 1950
August 1, 1956	Han Lih-wu	杭立武		Zhou Enlai	Phibul Songkhram	March 1, 1964
March 1, 1964	Liu Yu-wan	zh:刘驭万	Died on June 7, 1966, Ambassador to Thailand Liu Yu-wan dies of a heart attack in Bangkok.	Zhou Enlai	Thanom Kittikachorn	June 1, 1966
September 1, 1966	Peng Meng-chi	zh:彭孟缉		Zhou Enlai	Thanom Kittikachorn	February 1, 1969
February 1, 1969	Shen Chang-huan	zh:沈昌焕		Zhou Enlai	Thanom Kittikachorn	June 1, 1972
June 1, 1972	Ma Chi-Chuang	zh:馬紀壯	The Taiwanese embassy was closed on August 11, 1975.	Zhou Enlai	Thanom Kittikachorn	June 1, 1975
July 1, 1975			The governments in Beijing and Bangkok established diplomatic relations.	Zhou Enlai	Seni Pramoj	
January 1, 1976	Chai Zemin	zh:柴泽民		Hua Guofeng	Seni Pramoj	May 1, 1978
July 1, 1978	Zhang Weilie	zh:张伟烈	Chang Wei-lieh	Hua Guofeng	Kriangsak Chomanan	June 1, 1981
August 1, 1981	Shen Ping	zh:沈平		Zhao Ziyang	Prem Tinsulanonda	August 1, 1985
August 1, 1985	Zhang Dewei	zh:张德维		Zhao Ziyang	Prem Tinsulanonda	March 1, 1989
March 1, 1989	Li Shichun	zh:李世淳		Li Peng	Chatichai Choonhavan	December 1, 1993
January 1, 1994	Jin Guihua	zh:金桂华		Li Peng	Suchinda Kraprayoon	July 1, 1997
September 1, 1997	Fu Xuezhang	zh:傅学章		Li Peng	Chuan Leekpai	February 1, 2001
February 1, 2001	Yan Ting’ai	zh:晏廷爱		Zhu Rongji	Thaksin Shinawatra	May 1, 2004
May 1, 2004	Zhang Jiuhuan	zh:张九桓		Wen Jiabao	Thaksin Shinawatra	February 1, 2009
February 1, 2009	Guan Mu	zh:管木		Wen Jiabao	Samak Sundaravej	August 23, 2013
August 23, 2013	Ning Fukui	zh:宁赋魁		Li Keqiang	Yingluck Shinawatra	March 11, 2023

== See also ==
- China–Thailand relations
