= List of ambassadors of China to Namibia =

Coordinates: 22.568821°S 17.109506°E

Chinese Ambassador to Namibia
- Incumbent; Qiu Xuejun since December 2016
- Inaugural holder: Ji Peiding
- Formation: July 1990; 36 years ago

The Chinese ambassador to Namibia is the official representative of the People's Republic of China to the Republic of Namibia.

== List of representatives ==
Diplomatic agrément/Diplomatic accreditation	Ambassador	Chinese language zh:中国驻纳米比亚大使列表	Observations	Premier of the People's Republic of China	Prime Minister of Namibia	Term end
March 22, 1990			The governments in Windhoek and Beijing established diplomatic relations.	Li Peng	Hage Geingob	March 22, 1990
July 1990	Ji Peiding	zh:吉佩定		Li Peng	Hage Geingob	November 1993
November 1993	An Yongyu	zh:安永玉	From November 1993 - August 1996 he was ambassador in Namibia.; From November 1996 to November 2000 he was ambassador in Nairobi Kenya.	Li Peng	Hage Geingob	August 1996
September 1996	Lian Zhengbao	廉正保		Li Peng	Hage Geingob	August 1998
September 1998	Tang Zhenqi	zh:唐振琪	(*February 1944): From September 1998 - June 2000 he was ambassador in Namibia.; From July 2002 to December 2004 he was ambassador in Athen (Greece).	Zhu Rongji	Hage Geingob	June 2000
July 2000	Chen Laiyuan	zh:陈来元	From December 1997 to June 2000 he was ambassador in Lesotho.; From July 2000 to June 2003 he was ambassador in Namibia.	Zhu Rongji	Hage Geingob	June 2003
August 2003	Liang Yinzhu	zh:梁银柱	(September 1946): From April 1999 - June 2003 he was ambassador in Nigeria.; From August 2003 to October 2007 he was ambassador to Namibia.	Wen Jiabao	Theo-Ben Gurirab	October 2007
November 2007	Ren Xiaoping	zh:任小萍	(*1949 in Sichuan): From September 2004 to October 2007 she was Ambasadrice in Antigua and Barbuda.; From November 2007 to May 2010 he was ambassador in Namibia.	Wen Jiabao	Nahas Angula	May 2010
May 2010	Wei Ruixing	魏瑞兴		Wen Jiabao	Nahas Angula	July 2012
July 2012	Xin Shunkang	zh:忻顺康	From July 2012 to December 2016 he was ambassador in Namibia.; From December 2006 to July 2009 he was ambassador in Harare (Zimbabwe).	Wen Jiabao	Hage Geingob	
December 2016	Qiu Xuejun	邱学军		Li Keqiang	Saara Kuugongelwa	
