= Liu Zhengrong =

Chinese government official

Liu Zhengrong (刘正荣) is the deputy chief of the Internet Affairs Bureau of China.
