= Empress Zhou =

Empress Zhou (周皇后) may refer to:

- Empress Zhou (Former Shu) (given name unknown) (died 918), Chinese empress of the Former Shu state
- Empress Zhou (Ming Dynasty) (given name unknown) (died 1644), Chinese empress of the Ming Dynasty

== See also ==
- Empress Dowager Zhou (died 1504), Chinese empress dowager of the Ming Dynasty
- Queen Zhou (disambiguation)
