= Iranians in China =

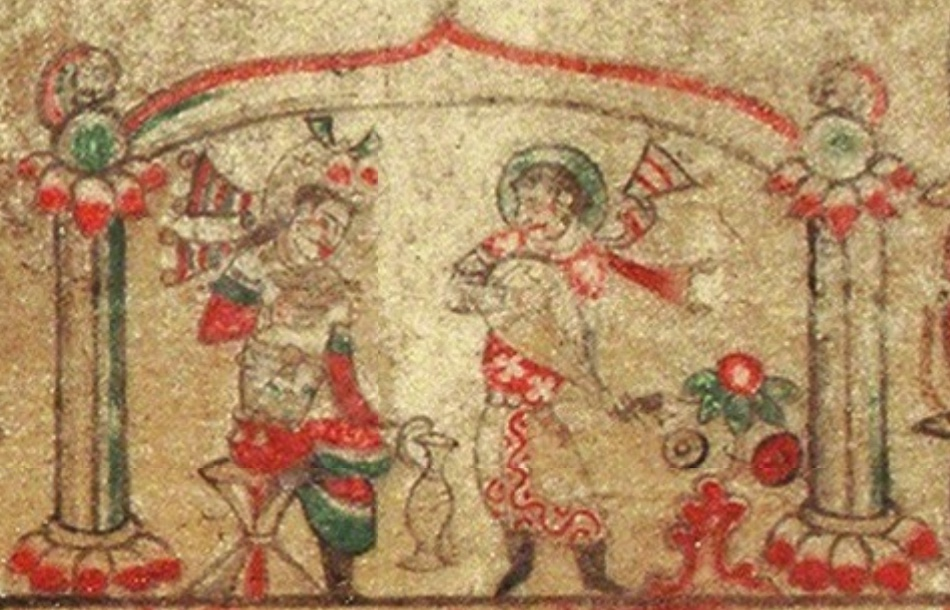
Detail of the stone panel painting on the sarcophagus, depicting two nimbate male figures dressing in Sasanian-style attire, drinking wine and playing pipa. Tomb of Yu Hong, 6th century CE.

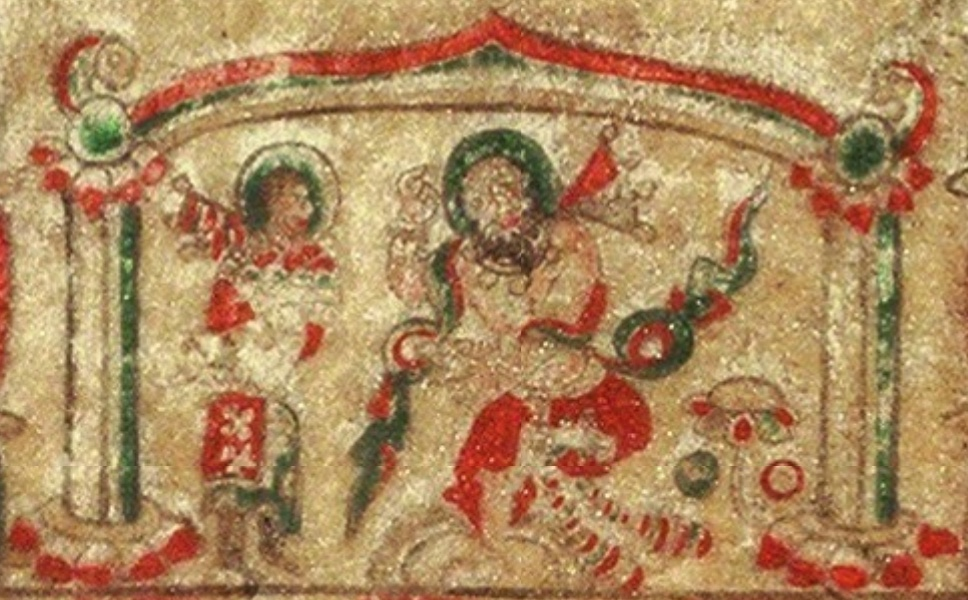
Left: a man holding a plate of fruits; right: a bearded man is performing the Huteng ("Barbarian leap") dance. Both figures have haloes. Tomb of Yu Hong, 6th century CE.

Iranian people, such as Persians and Sogdians, have lived in China throughout various periods in history.

== History ==
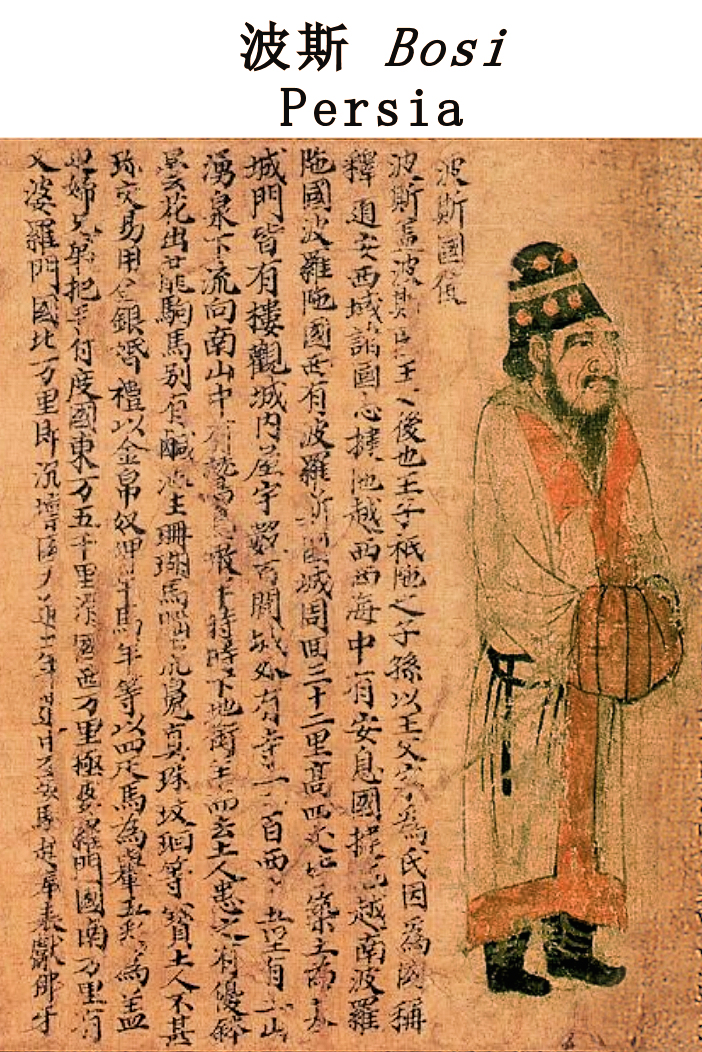
Persian ambassador at the Chinese court of Emperor Yuan of Liang in his capital Jingzhou in 526-539 CE, with explanatory text. Portraits of Periodical Offering of Liang, 11th century Song copy.

The Parthian Iranian An Shigao introduced Hinayana Buddhism to China, while the Kushan Lokaksema introduced Mahayana Buddhism.

=== Khwarezmians ===
Shams al-Din was an Iranian of Khwarezmian origin from Bukhara, and was appointed by the Mongols to serve as the first provincial governor of Yunnan, in southwestern China. He was allegedly descended from 'Alī bin Abī Tālib and the Prophet, Sayyid Ajall's father was Kamāl al-Dīn and his grandfather was Shams al-Dīn 'Umar al-Bukhārī. He served the court of the Yuan dynasty at Yanjing (modern day Beijing). Later, he was in charge of Imperial finances in 1259, sent to Yunnan by Kublai Khan after conquering the Kingdom of Dali in 1274. After his death, Sayyid was given the posthumous name Zhongyi (忠懿). Later, the imperial court conferred the title "Prince of Xianyang" (咸陽王) and the posthumous name Zhonghui (忠惠) to him.

Nasr al-Din (Persian: نصرالدین; Chinese: 納速剌丁, pinyin: Nàsùládīng;) (died 1292) was a provincial governor of Yunnan during the Yuan dynasty succeeded by his brother 忽先 Hu-sien (Hussein).

=== Persians ===
==== Tang dynasty ====
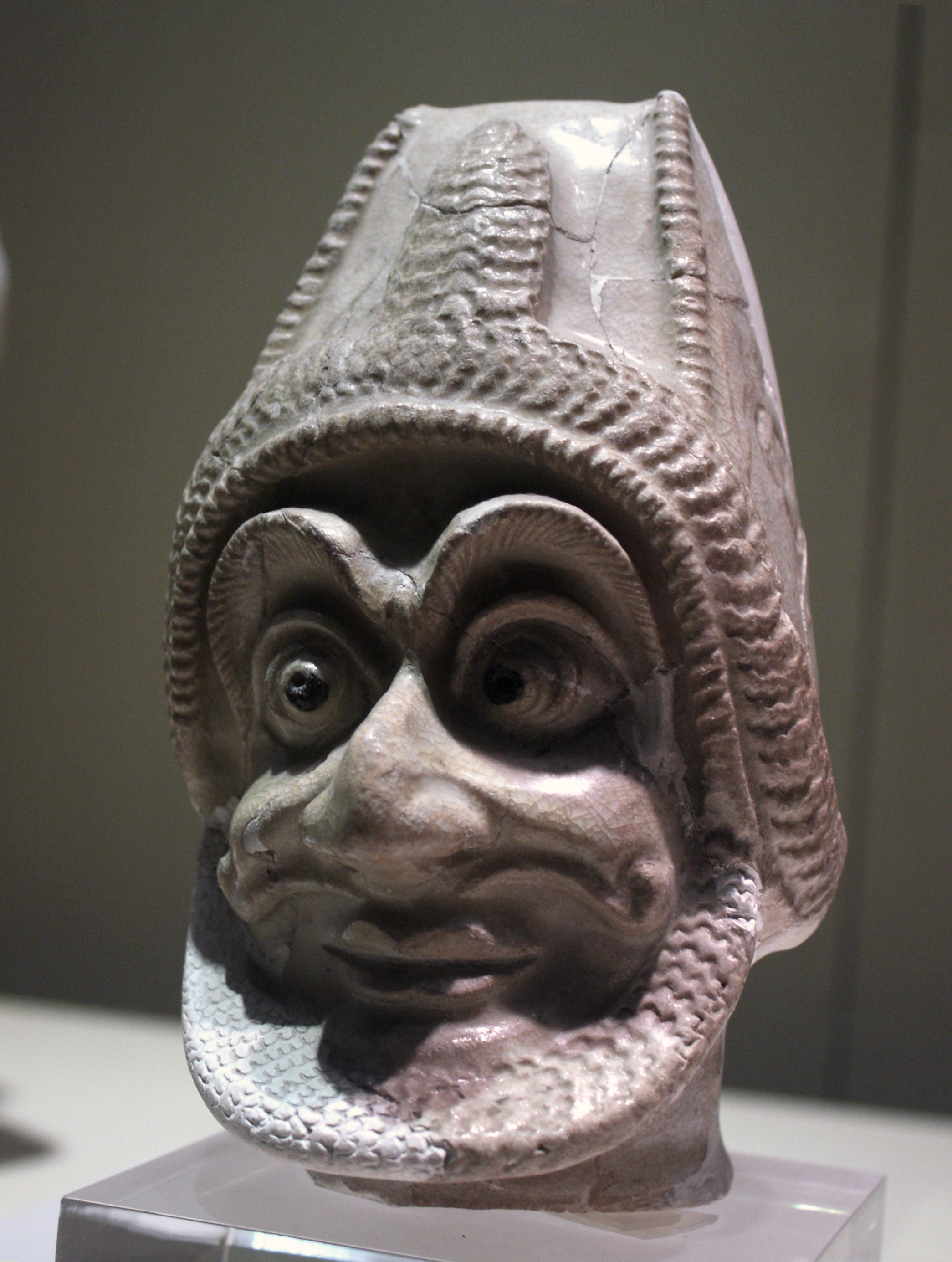
Tang-dynasty foreigner. Shaanxi History Museum, Xi'an

Sassanian royals like Peroz III and his son Narsieh fled the Arab Islamic invasion of Sassanid Persia for safety in Tang dynasty China where they were granted asylum.

The Chinese pirate Feng Ruofang stored Persian slaves on Hainan whom he captured when raiding ships in the 8th century. Hainan was filled with Persian slaves by Feng from his raids on their shipping. Persians sought a hardwood grown in Guangdong province. In 758 there was a raid on Canton by Persians and Arabs and then there was an attack in 760 in Yangzhou upon Persians and Arabs. On Hainan 100 katis of incense were burned in a single go by Feng.

==== Five dynasties and Ten Kingdoms period ====
During the Five Dynasties and Ten Kingdoms period (Wudai) (907–960), there are examples of Chinese emperors marrying Persian women. "In the times of Wudai (907–960) the emperors preferred to marry Persian women, and the Song dynasty official families liked to marry women from Dashi [Arabia]" was written by Chen Yuan.

===== Former Shu =====
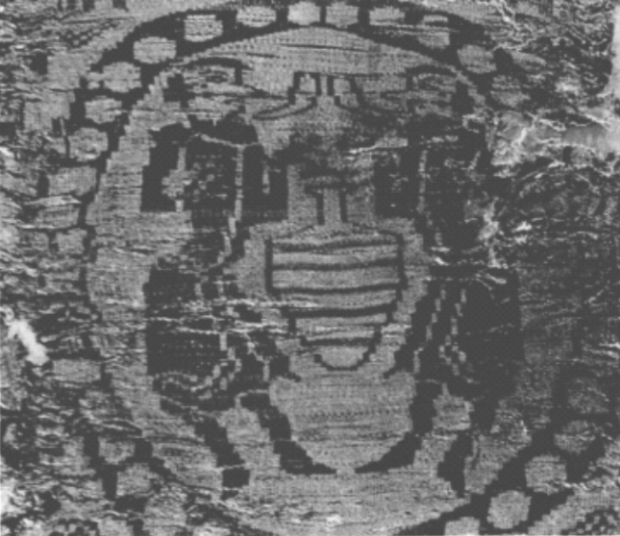
Textile fragment featuring a drinking scene of two Byzantines or Central Asians within the so-called "Sogdian pearl roundel"; Shu brocade, 7th–10th century.

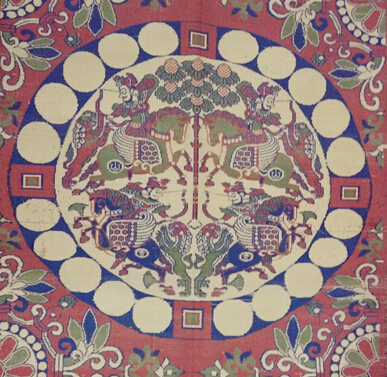
Textile fragment featuring a Sasanian horsemen hunting scene within a "Sogdian pearl roundel"; Shu brocade, 7th–10th century.

Many Iranians took the Chinese name Li to use as their last name when they moved to China. One prominent Iranian family included Li Xuan (李玹) and Li Xun. Sources say that either one of them was responsible for writing the Hai Yao Ben Cao (Chinese: 海藥本草; Wade–Giles: Hai Yao Pen Ts'ao), translating to "Overseas Pharmacopoeia". Li Xun was interested in foreign drugs and his book, The Haiyao Bencao, was all about foreign drugs. His family sold drugs for a living.

Li Xuan had an older sister Li Shunxian, who was known for being beautiful and was a concubine of the Former Shu Emperor Wang Zongyan, and a brother older than both of them named Li Xun. They lived at the court of the royal family of Former Shu in Chengdu (modern-day Sichuan). Li Shunxian also was a poet. Their family had come to China in 880 and were a wealthy merchant family. Li Xuan dealt with Taoist alchemy, perfumes and drugs.

The Huang Chao rebellion had earlier made their family flee. Li Susha, an Iranian who dealt in the incense trade, is speculated to be the grandfather of the three siblings.

Lo Hsiang-lin wrote a biography of the three siblings. The family were Nestorian Christians. The two brothers then became Taoist. Li Xun was also a poet who wrote in the manner of Chinese Song poetry. Li Xuan used urine to concoct "steroid sex hormones".

Iranians dominated the drug trade in China. In 824, Li Susha presented to Emperor Jingzong, the chen xiang ting zi, a type of drug.

Li Xun wrote poems in the tz'u style and was one of its masters. He and his brother Li Xuan traded in the drug business. The family lived in Sichuan.

Li Xun was known for his poetry and being the author of Overseas Pharmacopoeia (海藥本草). He and his brother Li Xuan were also well known perfume merchants who lived in the 900s AD. They lived at the court of the Former Shu. Li Xuan also, in addition to being an "alchemist", "naturalist" and "chess master", composed poetry like his brother.

===== Southern Han =====
From the tenth to twelfth century, Persian women were to be found in Guangzhou (Canton), some of them in the tenth century like Mei Zhu in the harem of the Emperor Liu Chang, and in the twelfth century large numbers of Persian women lived there, noted for wearing multiple earrings and "quarrelsome dispositions". It was recorded that "The Po- ssu-fu at Kuang-chou make holes all round their ears. There are some who wear more than twenty ear-rings." Descriptions of the sexual activities between Liu Chang and the Persian woman in the Song dynasty book the "Ch'ing-i-lu" by T'ao Ku were so graphic that the "Memoirs of the Research Department of the Toyo Bunko (the Oriental Library), Issue 2" refused to provide any quotes from it while discussing the subject. Liu had free time with the Persian women by delegating the task of governing to others. Multiple women originating from the Persian Gulf lived in Guangzhou's foreign quarter, they were all called "Persian women" (波斯婦 Po-ssu-fu or Bosifu).

Some scholars did not differentiate between Persian and Arab, and some say that the Chinese called all women coming from the Persian Gulf "Persian Women".

The young Chinese Emperor Liu Chang of the Southern Han dynasty had a harem, including one Persian girl he nicknamed Mei Zhu, which means "Beautiful Pearl". Liu liked the Persian girl (Mei Zhu) because of her tan skin color, described in French as "peau mate" (olive or light brown skinned). He and the Persian girl also liked to force young couples to go naked and play with them in the palace. and he favored her by "doting" on her. During the first year of his reign, he was not over sixteen years old when he had a taste for intercourse with Persian girls. The Persian girl was called a "princess".

The Wu Tai Shï says that Liu Ch'ang [劉鋹], Emperor of the Southern Han dynasty reigning at Canton, about A.D. 970. "was dallying with his palace girls and Persian [波斯] women in the inner apartments, and left the government of his state to the ministers." The History of the Five Dynasties (Wu Tai Shih) stated that- "Liu Chang then with his court- ladies and Po-ssu woman, indulged in amorous affiurs in the harem".

==== Song dynasty ====
Guangzhou (Canton) had a community which included Persian women in the 10th-12th centuries, found in Liu Chang's harem in the 10th century and in Song dynasty era Guangzhou in the 12th century the Persian women (波斯婦) there were observed wearing many earrings.

The Muslim women in Guangzhou were called either Persian women 波斯婦 or Pusaman 菩薩蠻 菩萨蛮 according to Zhu Yu's book "Pingzhou ke tan" 萍洲可談 which may be from "Mussulman" or "Bussulman" which means Muslim in Persian. Pusaman was also the name of a tune 樂府 about female dancers sent as tribute to China.

==== Ming dynasty ====
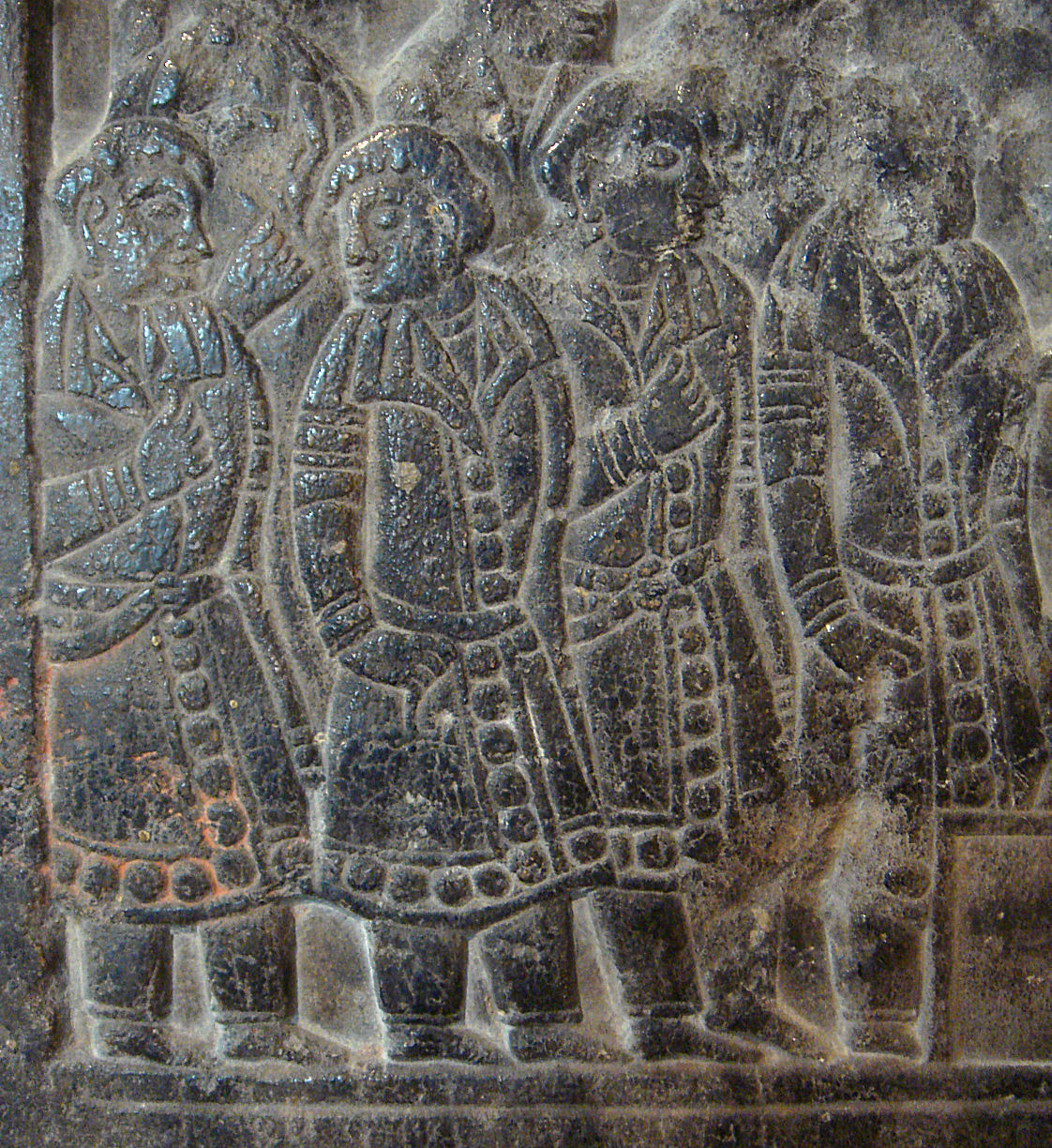
Sogdians, depicted on the Anyang funerary bed, circa 567/573.

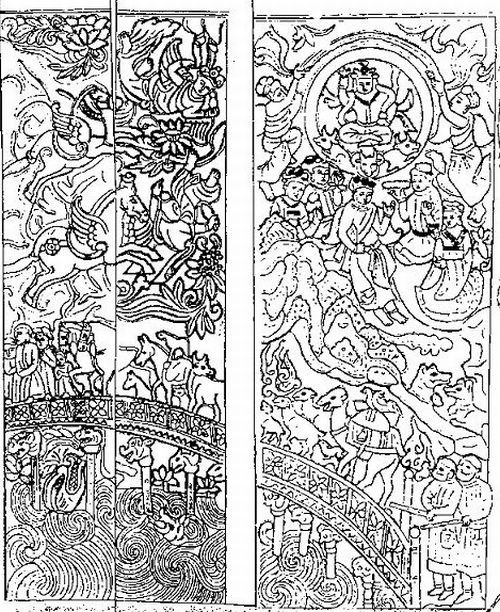
Sogdians on the Tomb of Wirkak, 580 CE.

Of the Han Chinese Li family in Quanzhou, Lin Nu, the son of Li Lu, visited Hormuz in Persia in 1376, married a Persian or an Arab girl, and brought her back to Quanzhou. Li Nu was the ancestor of the Ming Dynasty reformer Li Chih. Lin Nu and his descendants were erased from the family genealogy by his relatives who were angry at him for converting to Islam and marrying a Persian girl because xenophobic feeling against foreigners was strong at that time due to Persian Semu atrocities in the Ispah Rebellion in which the Yuan defeated the Ispah and the Semu were massacred. The branch of the family who held to their Chinese customs felt ashamed so they changed their surname from Lin to Li to avoid associating with their relatives, Lin Nu's descendants with his Persian wife who practiced Islam.

=== Sogdians ===
==== Tang dynasty ====
Sogdians in China used 9 Chinese surnames after the Chinese name of the states they came from.

Xizhou had a Han and Sogdian population. A record from the Astana Cemetery dating to 639 preserves the transaction where a Sogdian slave girl was being sold in Xizhou. The Han Zhang family also owned Chunxiang, a Turk slave woman in Xizhou. He Deli, a Sogdian who knew how to speak Turkic, Chinese and translated. 120 coins of silver were paid for the slave girl from Samarkand. The contract was written in Sogdian. Translated by Yoshida Yutaka. The slave girl was from the Chuyakk family and born in Central Asia. Upach was her name and the buyer's name was written as Yansyan in Sogdian from the Chan family. The seller of the slave was from Samarqand called Wakhushuvirt and his father was Tudhakk The contract said they could they do anything they wanted to Upach, give her away, sell her, abuse her, beat her and she belonged to Yansyan's family forever. Zhang Yanxiang 張延相, whose name is found in Chinese language documents in Turfan, is believed to be Chan Yansyan. Kuchean girls were sold as slaves in the Jin and Wei dynasties.

On the Silk Road, slave girls were a major item and much more expensive than silk. Silk was up to five times less than the value of a slave girl. Central Asian slave girls were exported from Central Asia Iranian areas to China. It is believed wealthy merchants and noblemen of the Chinese capital of Chang'an, were the consumers for the huge number of Central Asian slave women brought by the Sogdians, to sell to the Chinese. The Central Asian foreign women in the Sogdian owned wineshops in the Chinese capital are believed to have been slaves, as Chinese poets depicted then as homesick, sad and melancholy and they would service travelers by keeping them company overnight. Merchants and literati would frequent the wineshops. The Sogdians reaped massive profits from selling slave girls and so did the Chinese government by taxing the sale of the slaves. Slave girls were one of the major products Chinese bought from Sogdians. Persian poets often wrote about wine and women since the wineservers were often girls and this wine culture with girl servers seems to have spread to China. There were many Sogdian wineshops and Persian shops in Chang'an along with a large slave market. The wineshops were staffed with young girls who served wine to customers and danced for them. Most of the slave girls were 14 or 15 years old. They provided services like sex, dancing, singing, and served wine to their customers in Chang'an as ordered their masters who ran the wineshops. A Sogdian merchant, Kang Weiyi had Indian, Central Asian, and Bactrians among the 15 slave girls he was bringing to sell in the Chinese capital of Chang'an. Khotan and Kucha both sold women for sexual services.

Shi Randian was a Xizhou Sogdian merchant who had a Chinese military title. He went to Guazhou to trade from Kucha. He went to Shazhou and Yizhou. A local acted as Shi Randian's guarantor.

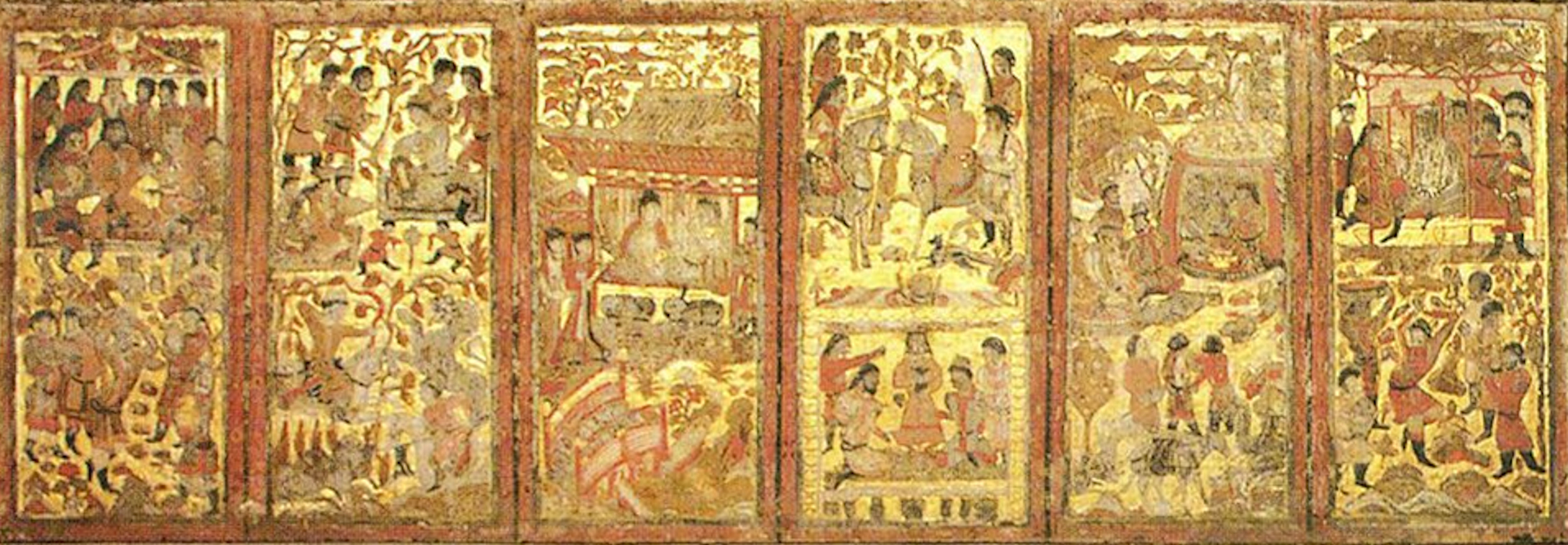
Sogdian figures on the "Tomb of An Jia", Xi'an, China. Dated 579 CE. Shaanxi History Museum.

In 731 a Han Chinese called Tang Rong 唐榮 from the capital district bought an 11 year old slave girl Shimaner 失滿兒 from Mi Lushan 米祿山, a Sogdian recorded in a contract written in Chinese. There was a translator in Xizhou, Di Nanipan who had a Sogdian name but a non-Sogdian surname. Either he was not a Sogdian and was given the name because Sogdian language was prevalent or only his mother was Sogdian was his father was Han.

Sogdians opened shops which sold wine and had dance performances by Sogdian women called 胡姬酒肆. The poet Li Bai in his poem Shao Nian Xing wrote about a young man who entered one of these Huji Jiusi shops.

Lady Caoyena 曹野那 was a concubine of the Chinese Emperor Xuanzong of Tang and gave birth to the Princess of Shou'an Li Chongniang 李蟲娘. The historian Ge Chengji identified Caoyena as a Sogdian from the Principality of Ushrusana 曹國 (昭武九姓) as indicated by the surname Cao which was adopted by Sogdians from Ushrusana who came to China since China called Ushrusana "Cao kingdom" and while Yena is a foreign name to Chinese, it is a unisex Sogdian name which means "most favorite person" in Sogdian. She may have been one of the Sogdian Hu women "胡人女子" or Sogdian whirling dancing girls "胡旋女" who were given as tribute by Sogdians to China. Names like Cao Yena and Cao Yanna were used by Sogdians which appears on historical texts from Turfan. Chinese frequently bought Hu (Sogdian) slave girls in the Gaochang (Turfan) markets. Yena means favorite one in Sogdian.

===== Acrobats and dancers =====
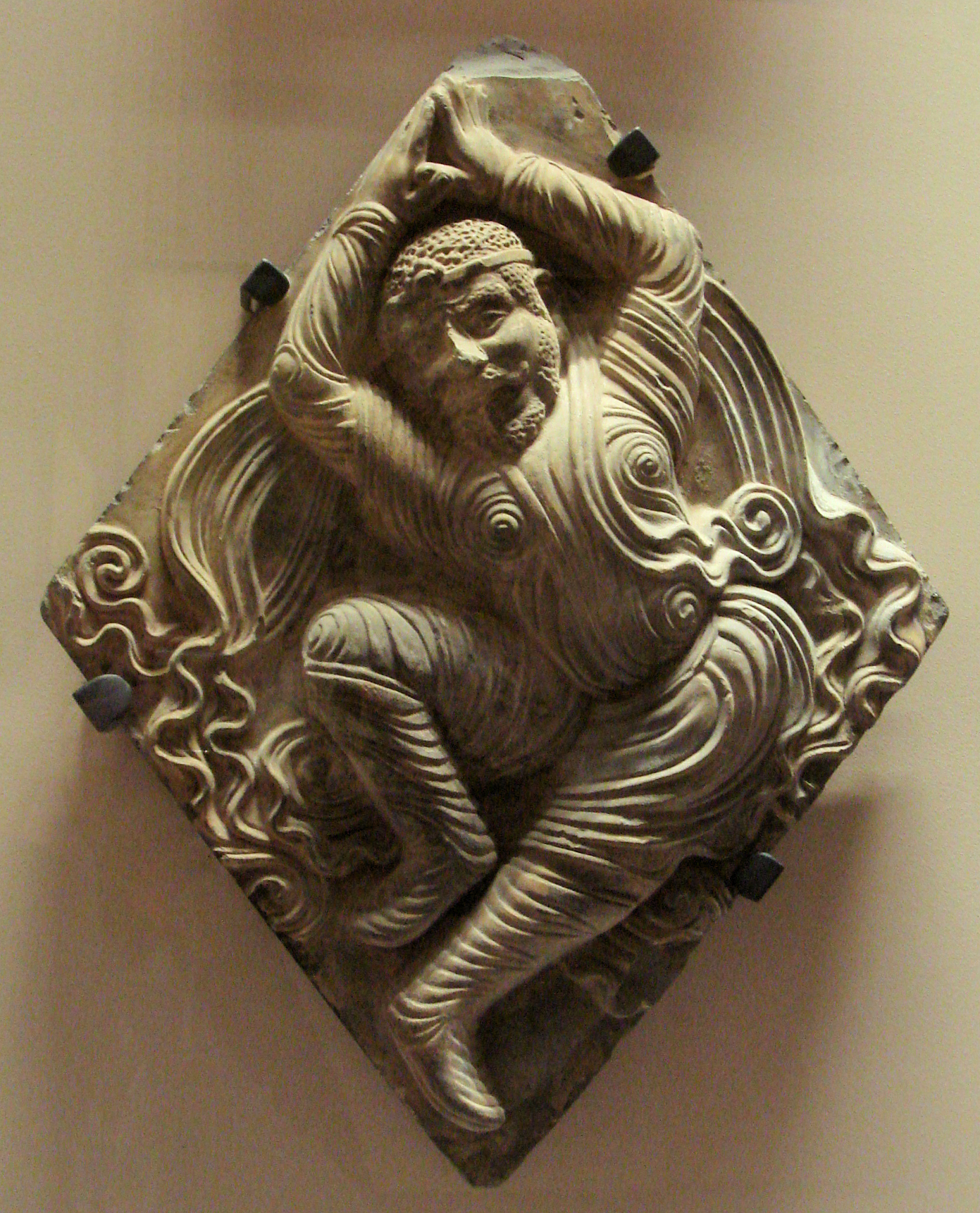
Sogdian Huteng dancer, Xiuding temple pagoda, Anyang, Hunan, China, Tang dynasty, 7th century.

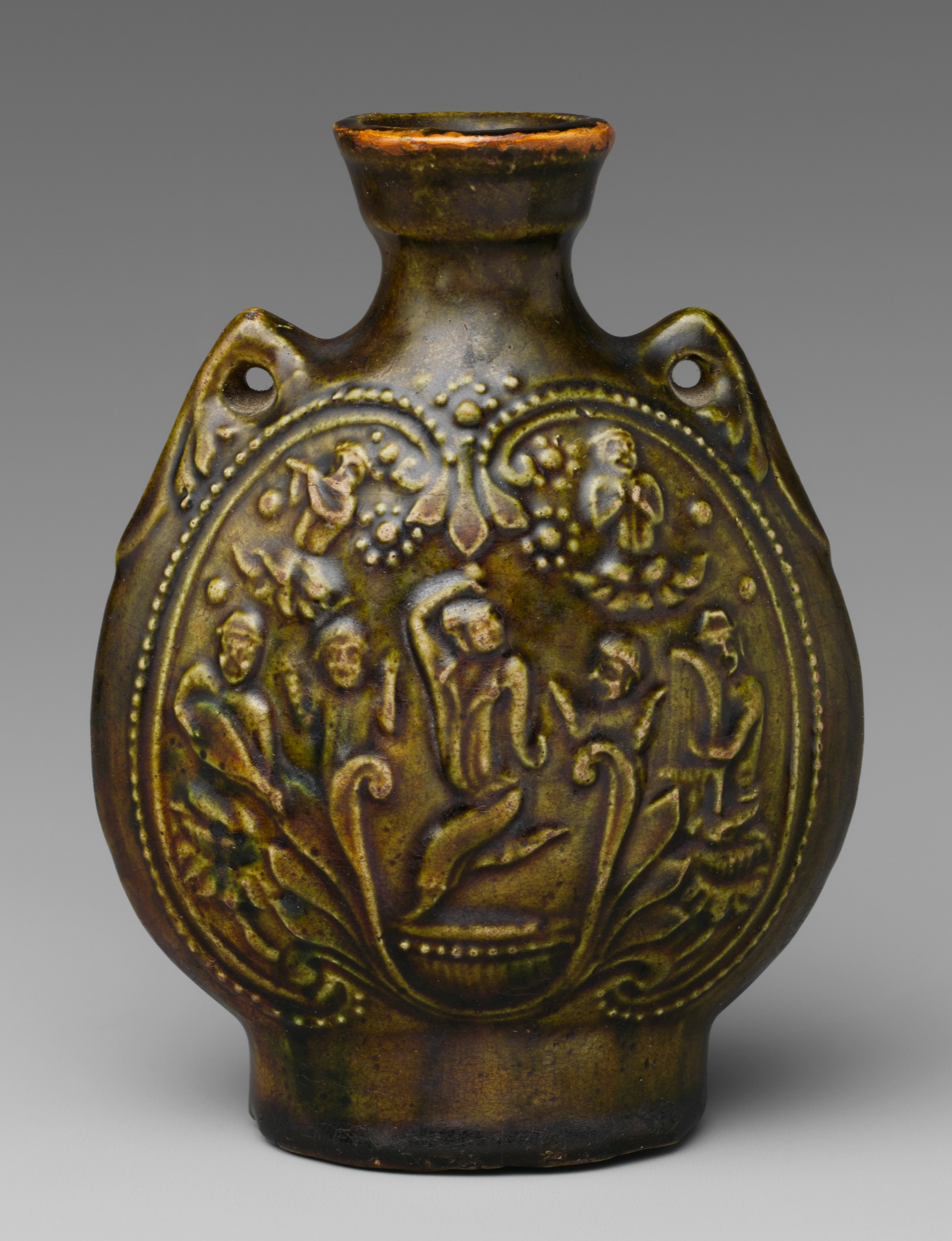
Pilgrim flask with Central Asian dancers, China, 6th century CE. Metropolitan Museum of Art

Li Bai wrote a poem about a boy riding a white horse "gently walking in the spring breeze. Where can he be going, after having trodden upon so many fallen flowers? Behold! How he smiles as he enters a tavern attended by a Persian girl!" The dancing girls jumped and whirled with silk gauze clothing. Western caucasian girls ran these wine stores as Li Bai wrote: "... how he smiles as he enters a bar tended by a Persian girl." These blue eyed girls were frequented by playboys in Chang'an. The northeastern Iranian Sogdians in Khumdeh, Maimargh, Samarkand, and Kesh in 718, 719, 727, and 729 sent dancing whirling girls as tribute to the Chinese Imperial court. Yuan Chen and Bo Juyi wrote poems on these Sogdian girls. The poem by Bo Juyi says the Iranian girl from Sogdia whirled while drums and strings were played and bowed to the Emperor when it was over. It mentioned people already in China learned how to do the whirl like An Lushan and Yang Guifei. Yuan Chen mentioned that a whirling girl was given to the Emperor by the Iranians at the time of An Lushan's rebellion and that the Emperor was enchanted by her dance. The song mentions sashes around her body twirling as she danced. Xuangzang's flight to Sichuan is mentioned at the end of the song. Chinese cities saw high demand for dancers from Central Asia and in the wineshops of the cities the Iranian waitresses were admired over by young Chinese poets. China and India had major appetite for Iranian dancers. Blue eyed waitresses in the pleasure quarters poured wine. Giant balls were used to dance on by the Sogdian whirling girls and dancers from Tashkent. Tashkent dancing girls, according to Bai Juyi, bared their shoulders by pulling their blouses and came out of lotuses when starting their dance. The twirling girls from Sogdia danced on rolling balls and wore boots made of deerskin which were colored red, green pants, and crimson robes and they were sent to the Emperor Xuanzong. Western singing and dancing girls filled Chang'an taverns. Samarkand and Tashkent dancing girls who came to China were called "hu" which was used by Chinese to refer to Iranian countries. Dancing girls were among the gifts sent in 10 diplomatic embassies from "Persia" to China in the reigns of Kaiyuan (Emperor Ruizong)) and Tianbao (Emperor Xuanzong). Emperor Yan-si (Emperor Yang of Sui) received from Persia 10 young girl dancers. Central Asian Iranian girls who performed as acrobats, dancers, musicians, and waitresses were referred to by Chinese poets as Hu ji 胡姬. Tokharestan and Sogdiana style dances like boti, huteng 柘枝, and huxuan 胡旋. The Shi kingdom (Tashkent) brought the Huteng dance to China which involved back flips, leaps and spinning. The Kang kingdom brought the "whirling barbarian" huxuan dance to China. It involved spinning while dressed in shoes of red leather and white pants by a woman. The Jumi, Shi, Wei, and Kang kingdoms in Central Asia sent dance girls to perform the huxuan dance for the Xuanzong Emperor in the Tianbao and Kaiyuan eras. Bai Juyi wrote the "Huxuan Dance Girl" poem. The "thorn branch" zhezhi dance was another one introduced to China. The Sogdian Kang kingdom is where huxuan dance came from according to the Tong Dian by Du Yu. In Luoyang and Chang'an these Serindian dances were extremely popular. Huxian and Huteng dances had connections to the Zoroastrian beliefs practiced in Sogdiana. Huxian and Huteng were practiced by Central Asians in the Northern Qi dynasty of China. Huxuan dance was introduced to China through long journeys over thousands of kilometers by girls from Kang in Sogdia. In the T'ang Annals we read that in the beginning of the period K'ai-yuan (a.d. 713–741) the country of K'an (Sogdiana), an Iranian region, sent as tribute to the Chinese Court coats-of-mail, cups of rock-crystal, bottles of agate, ostrich-eggs, textiles styled yüe no, dwarfs, and dancing-girls of Hu-suan 胡旋 (Xwārism).1 In the Ts'e fu yüan kwei the date of this event is more accurately fixed in the year 718.2

The Dunhuang ruler received from the Ganzhou Kaghan 40 Sogdian slaves as tribute.

Central Asian rulers from Chach sent dancing girls and from Khuttal sent singing girls to Tang dynasty China.

Central Asian rulers sent slave musicians as tribute to China. A female musician troupe was sent from the upper Oxus country of Khuttal by its king in 733 to China. The Tang dynasty Chinese Xuanzang (Hsüan Tsung) emperor's court received Sogdian girls who danced on rolling balls and dressed in boots of red deerskin, pantaloons made of green damask and crimson robes as tribute from Samarkand, Maimargh, Kish and Kumadh in the beginning of the 8th century. They were called "Western Twirling Girls" and these female dancers were a favorite in China.There was an erotic and amorous dance done by two girls wearing gold bells on peaked hats, red shoes and silver girdles belted around caftans which were diaphanous and embroided. This dance was called "The Dance of Chach" from Tashkent and was performed by these girls sent to China.

During the An Lushan rebellion, Tang forces massacred many hu or foreigners. Those with big noses resembling those of the hu were also frequently killed accidentally in these massacres.

== See also ==
- An Xuan
- Äynu people
- Bezeklik Caves
- Chinese Iranian (disambiguation)
- Chinese Tajiks
- Indo-Aryan migrations
- Ghurid dynasty
- Greco-Buddhist monasticism
- Hotan Prefecture
- Hui people
- Kashgar Prefecture
- Kingdom of Khotan
- Kushan Empire
- Mani (prophet)
- Manichaean script
- Old Uyghur alphabet
- Pahlavi scripts (Inscriptions of Turpan)
- Pahlavi Psalter
- Pamiris
- Qocho
- Rouran Khaganate
- Scythians
- Scythian languages
- Silk Road transmission of Buddhism
- Tarim Basin
- Tocharians
- Tocharian languages
- Sogdian alphabet
- Sogdian Daēnās
- The Buddha
- Taxkorgan Tajik Autonomous County
- Turkic settlement of the Tarim Basin
- Turpan
- Wakhi people
- Wusun
- Xiongnu
- Yarkant County
- Yuezhi
