= Qiande =

Qiande (乾德) was a Chinese era name used by several emperors of China. It may refer to:

- Qiande (919–924), era name used by Wang Zongyan, emperor of Former Shu
- Qiande (963–968), era name used by Emperor Taizu of Song (also used by concurrent rulers of Southern Tang, Wuyue and Goryeo)
