= Consort Xu =

Consort Xu may refer to:

- Empress Dowager Xu (died 926), known as Consort Xu (徐賢妃) of the Former Shu, before she became empress dowager
- Madame Huarui (940–976), also known as Consort Xu (徐惠妃) of the Later Shu
