= Xiankang =

Xiankang (咸康) was a Chinese era name used by several emperors of China. It may refer to:

- Xiankang (335–342), era name used by Emperor Cheng of Jin
- Xiankang (925–926), era name used by Wang Zongyan, emperor of Former Shu
