= Jin Feishan =

Jin Feishan (Chinese: 金飛山; died 926) was an empress of the Chinese Five Dynasties and Ten Kingdoms period Former Shu state. She was the second wife of Former Shu's last emperor Wang Yan (né Wang Zongyan).

== Background ==
It is not known when Jin Feishan was born, but it is known that she was from the Former Shu capital Chengdu. Her father Jin Ye (金業) was a fairly wealthy farmer who was sonless, but who was known to have had a loving relationship with his wife. By the time that Jin Feishan was 15, she was said to be extremely beautiful and a capable painter. Early in Wang Yan's Qiande era (918-924), she was selected to be a consort to him in the palace. In or after 921, when he effectively divorced and deposed his first wife Empress Gao by sending her back to the house of her father Gao Zhiyan (高知言), he created Consort Jin as the new empress to replace her.

== As empress ==
However, Wang Yan in fact favored his cousin Consort Wei more. Perhaps because of this, at some point, he deposed Empress Jin as well. However, another imperial consort, Consort Qian, spoke in her defense, and Wang Yan restored Empress Jin to her empress position. When Former Shu fell to its northeastern neighbor Later Tang in 925, Wang Yan tried to entrust his wife — most likely referring to Empress Jin — and his mother Empress Dowager Xu to the care of the Later Tang official Li Yan (李嚴). In 926, with the Later Tang realm engulfed in military mutinies, Later Tang's emperor Li Cunxu ordered the deaths of Wang Yan and his household; Empress Jin was one member of the imperial household who died in the killing.

== Notes and references ==
- Spring and Autumn Annals of the Ten Kingdoms, vol. 38.

Regnal titles
Preceded by Empress Gao	Empress of Former Shu; 921?–925	Succeeded by None (dynasty destroyed)
Preceded by Empress Gao	Empress of China (Southwest); 921?–925	Succeeded by Empress Liu of Later Tang
