= Chinese Iranian =

Chinese Iranian or Iranian Chinese may refer to:

- China-Iran relations
- Chinese people in Iran
- Iranians in China, such as:
  - An Shih Kao
  - An Hsuan
  - Karen Mok (mother is fourth-Persian half-Chinese)
- Tajiks of Xinjiang people of Chinese and Iranian descent
