= Lin Nu =

Chinese philosopher

- Native name: 林駑
- Born: 14th century Quanzhou, Fujian, China
- Occupation: Merchant, Scholar
- Notable works: Known for his travels to Persia and conversion to Islam

Lin Nu (林駑, Xiao'erjing: لٍ ﻧُﻮْ) was a Chinese merchant and scholar in the early Ming dynasty. He is the ancestor of the late Ming philosopher Li Zhi. His family was Han Chinese in origin and the branch that remained true to Han culture cut off the Lin Nu's branch for marrying a foreigner and converting to another religion.

His father was Lin Lü (林閭). Around 1376 the 30-year-old Lin Nu visited Ormuz in Persia, converted to Islam, and married a Semu girl (“娶色目女”) (most likely Persian or Arab) and brought her back to Quanzhou in Fujian. This was recorded in the Lin and Li genealogy (《林李宗谱》).

It is believed that the marriage of the Hormuzian Persian girl to Lin Nu which accompanied his conversion to Islam is what caused the other branch of the family to change their surname which is why the same family uses two surnames, Lin and Li, since they were very much against conversion to foreign religions and marriage to other ethnicities in the atmosphere after the Yuan dynasty collapsed and the harsh discrimination (four caste system) by the Yuan rulers against Southern Han Chinese. The biography of Lin Nu says he married a Semu girl and converted to Islam at a mosque in Hormuz in 1384 before coming back to China. Li Guangqi said his uncle Lin Nu's marriage to the foreign girl and conversion to her religion caused his branch of the family to exclude his uncle's descendants from the genealogy because they practiced Islam and change the surname of his own branch of the family to Li to disassociate them from the Lin surname. Li Guangqi attacked the religion and customs of the Semu including Islam and other foreign religions saying they were incompatible with Chinese/Confucian culture and that their language sounded like owl screeching and their script resembled worms. He cited ancient Chinese texts about barbarians and said his uncle was "seduced" by Semu culture "the strange and exotic" and said he included this attack on the Semu religions in the family genealogy to make sure no one from the family would repeat what their uncle did by marrying a foreign girl and converting a foreign religion. This represented a general xenophobic attitude The genealogy refers to the Ispah rebellion and cruelties perpetrated by the Semu armies. The Persian Semu in the Ispah rebellion were crushed and defeated by the Yuan and the Chinese massacred the defeated Semu. The xenophobia and resentment against Lin Nu by his Han family for marrying the Persian girl and converting to Islam stemmed from this.

== See also ==
- Iranians in China
- Liu Chang (Southern Han)
- Li Shunxian
- Wang Zongyan
