= Pu Shougeng =

Muslim merchant and official in China

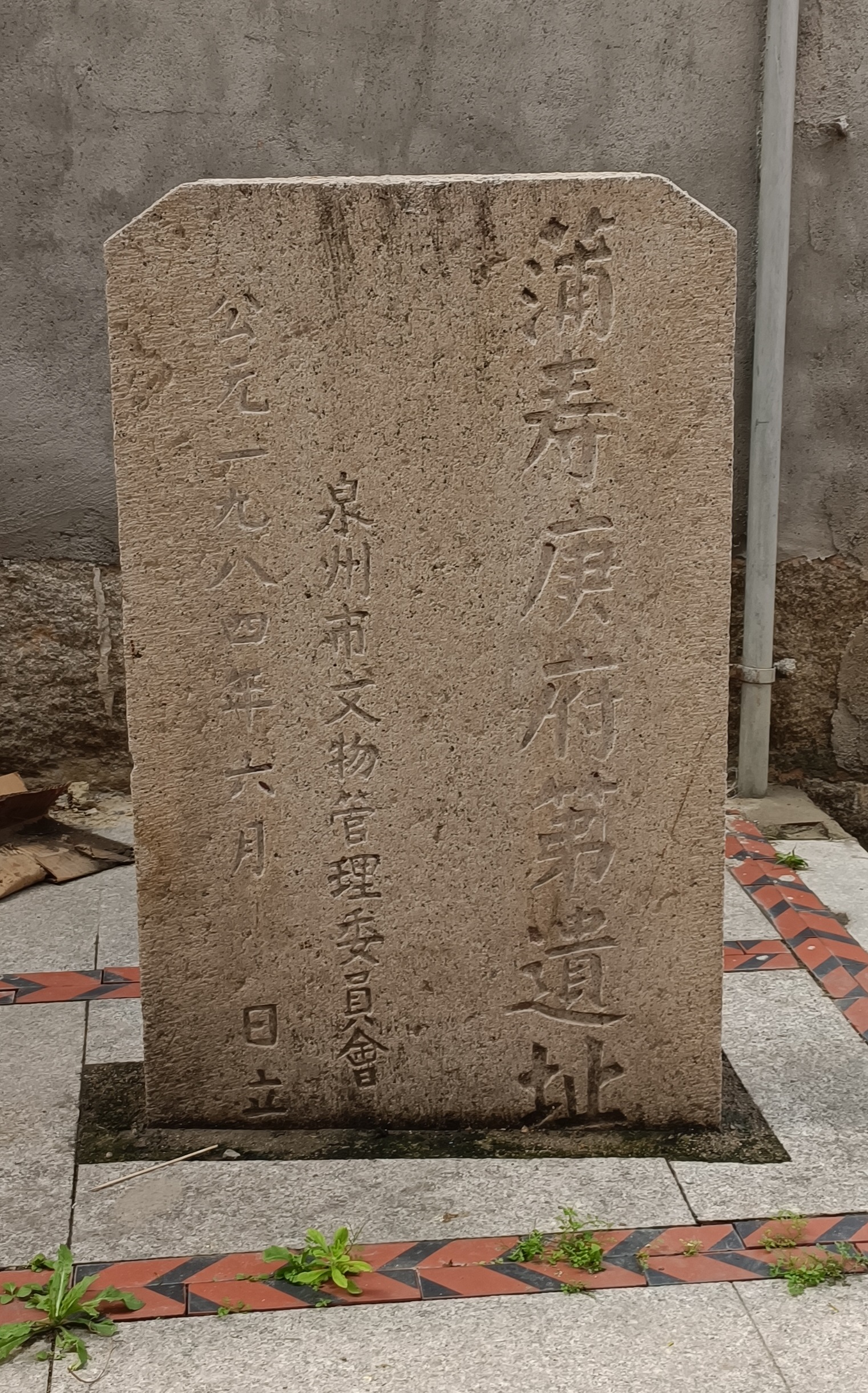
Plaque marking the site of Pu Shougeng's house

Pu Shougeng (traditional Chinese: 蒲壽庚; simplified Chinese: 蒲寿庚; Wade–Giles: Pʽu Shou-keng; fl. c. 1250–1284) was a Muslim merchant and administrator of China's Southern Song and Yuan dynasties.

The surname Pu was likely derived from Arabic Abū (father). Pu's family background is unknown. According to one theory, his family came from Central Asia to Sichuan during the early Song and later emigrated to Quanzhou. According to another, they arrived in the Southern Song from Champa. The most likely scenario is that his family was of South Arabian or Central Asian Persian origin and settled in Guangzhou.

Pu was one of the wealthiest merchants in Fujian when, around 1250, he was appointed Superintendent of Maritime Trade in Quanzhou. He held the post for almost thirty years, using it to amass great wealth.

When the Southern Song court fled to Quanzhou, Pu claimed that there were many royal clan members in Quanzhou waiting to welcome the emperor; these clansmen, Pu alleged, wished to make Quanzhou the new Song capital. However, Pu Shougeng’s loyalty was already doubted when he boarded the emperor’s ship in Quanzhou Harbor. In fact, some Song officers "openly hinted that Pu’s purpose was to entice the emperor [then docked offshore, in Quanzhou Harbor] to go ashore so as to detain him, then use him as a pawn to improve his own bargaining position with the Mongols."

Thus, "Song admiral Zhang Shijie politely declined, having received intelligence reports that Pu Shougeng was secretly negotiating with Yuan agents." By that time, "the Mongols thought [Pu] the ideal person to help them build up their navy." The Mongol general Bayan (伯顏) had already sent a lieutenant to Quanzhou to negotiate a secret agreement with Pu, but "rumors and spy reports of [said] secret agreement reached [Admiral] Zhang," who confiscated Pu's fortune to finance the Song defense against the Yuan.

The Yuan dynasty made him Defender-General of the State (鎭國將軍) and later Assistant Civil Administrator (參知政事) of Jiangxi. In 1281, he was appointed one of two executive assistants to the provincial secretariat of Fujian. Thereafter he fades from view, but his family remained prominent under the Yuan. Many members of his family were tortured and slaughtered in the Ispah rebellion. The survivors remained devout Muslims and were prohibited from holding public office under the Ming on account of their defection from the Song.
