= Liu Chang (Southern Han) =

Emperor of Southern Han from 958 to 971

Liu Chang 劉鋹

4th and last emperor of Southern Han
- Reign: 958–971
- Predecessor: Liu Sheng
- Born: 942
- Died: 980 (aged 37–38)
- Issue: 4 sons
Names
- Surname: Liú (劉); Given name: Jìxīng (繼興), later changed to Chǎng (鋹)
Era name and dates
- Dàbǎo (大寶): 958-972
- House: Liu
- Dynasty: Southern Han

Liu Chang
- Traditional Chinese: 劉鋹
- Simplified Chinese: 刘𬬮
Transcriptions
Standard Mandarin
- Hanyu Pinyin: Liú Chǎng
- Wade–Giles: Liu^{2} Ch'ang^{3}
Yue: Cantonese
- Jyutping: Lau4 Coeng2

Liu Chang (Chinese: 劉鋹; 942–980), originally Liu Jixing (劉繼興), was the fourth, last and youngest emperor of China's Southern Han dynasty during the warring Five Dynasties and Ten Kingdoms period, reigning from 958 until the Southern Han was annexed by the Northern Song dynasty in 971.

== Life ==
He succeeded his father Liu Sheng because he was the eldest son. He only left eunuchs in power in his court and mandated castration for anyone who wanted to work for his court because he believed people with children could not be completely loyal. When Liu Chang became Emperor he was only a "mere youth".

== Reign ==
Liu became Emperor at the age of sixteen. Historical records report that Liu Chang spent so much time with his harem that he abandoned government affairs. His most favorite concubine was one young Persian girl he called Mèi Zhū (媚豬). The "History of Five dynasties and Ten Kingdoms" described the Persian woman as having copper colored skin and large eyes. It was told that she loved pearls, so Liu Chang ordered fishermen to dive to find thousands of pearls for her. Many of the fishermen died. He gave her a pearl dudou, pearl crowns, pearl blouses, and pearl skirts. He also used pearls and silver to renovate his palaces.

The historical text Spring and Autumn Annals of the Ten Kingdoms recorded that Liu Chang indulged in sex games. He had alchemists create aphrodisiacs to induce sexual desire as pregame warmup. One of his games was called "Naked in Twos" (大體雙) in which he paired young men with palace women, made them strip naked and have sex together while he and his Persian lover were carried around to watch them. Liu and Mei Zhu then decided whether the man or woman "won". If the man "defeated" the woman, both were rewarded, but if the woman won and defeated the man, Liu had the man castrated.

The Historical Records of the Five Dynasties says that Liu Chang spent all his time in the harem, and that he never came out to handle governance work, leaving it to Kong Chengshu and the eunuchs to take over government business. The naked orgies he had were similar to those his uncle Liu Bin had.

Graphic descriptions of what the Persian woman and Liu Chang did together were recorded in Qingyilu written by Tao Gu. The Yan Yibian (豔異編) gives the same account as the Qingyilu. They mention a hall installed in his palace called "Hou chuang jian" (候窗監) where he indulged himself with her.

The fact that Liu Chang's harem had Persian girls is seen as evidence for the existence of a Persian community in southern China during this time. There was a thriving Persian community in Guangzhou during the 10th–12th centuries. The Persians in Guangzhou were called either Bōsī (波斯, "Parsi") or Púsàmán (菩薩蠻, "Muslim").

Liu Chang also employed women shamans. He is also known to have held the "Red Cloud Banquet", a festival for the litchi fruit.

He was the last Emperor of Southern Han, as his kingdom was defeated and taken over by the Song dynasty in 972. He reigned for a total of 14 years.

== Family ==
=== Known Concubines ===
- Noble Consort Li (李貴妃)
- Beautiful Lady Li (李美人)
- Lu Qiongxian, Talented Lady (才人 盧瓊仙)
- Su Xin, Beautiful Lady (美人 素馨)
- Mei Zhu (媚豬)

=== Sons ===
- Liu Shoujie (劉守節)
- Liu Shouzheng (劉守正)
- Liu Shousu (劉守素)
- Liu Shoutong (劉守通)

Statues of two of Liu Chang's sons were described as looking like "barbarian devils" and they may have come from the Persian woman.

== See also ==
- Iranians in China
- Li Shunxian
- Wang Zongyan
- Lin Nu
