= Lu Qiongxian =

Chinese imperial servant

Lu Qiongxian (盧瓊仙, fl. 10th-century), was a Chinese imperial servant and, behind the scenes, wielded significant political power in steering the empire.

She was a servant in the court of Liu Chang (Southern Han), who ruled in 958–972 CE. Some historians believe she was a concubine, some believe she was a general maid or palace servant, and some believe she was actually an official court scholar - one of several female scholars at the court. In this era, women were more easily accepted in positions of power and learning, compared to in the more conservative centuries that followed.

Lu Qiongxian was recognized for her intelligence and eloquence, and was noted as being skilled in poetry. She "wore a court dress and a crown, and participated in political affairs".

As the Emperor was not interested in politics, he left the state affairs to Lu Qiongxian, who managed them with the eunuchs Gong Chengshu and Chen Yanshou. Along with these eunuch advisors, "all state affairs were decided" by Lu Qiongxian.

Some chronicles - largely written in later times, when Confucian norms saw a woman in power as hugely negative - describe Lu Qiongxian as a drunken, despotic power, who killed arbitrarily and, in a famous story, supported a sorcerer brought into the court. In other chronicles, however, she is described as intelligent, capable, and skilled in the arts.
