= Consort Zhou =

Consort Zhou may refer to:

- Consort Zhou (Cheng) (died 363), concubine of Emperor Cheng of Jin
- Empress Zhou (Former Shu) (died 918), wife of Wang Jian (Emperor Gaozu)
- Queen Zhou the Elder (936–964), first wife of Li Yu (ruler of Southern Tang)
- Empress Zhou (Ming dynasty) (1611–1644), wife of the Chongzhen Emperor
