= Li Shunxian =

Persian-Chinese poet and concubine

- Zhaoyi of Former Shu
- Born: c. 900; Zi Prefecture, Tang dynasty
- Died: 926 (aged 25–26); Yizhou, Later Tang
- Spouse: Wang Yan
- Religion: Possibly Zoroastrian or East Syriac Christian
- Occupation: Poet, painter
- Relatives: Li Xun (brother); Li Xuan (brother)

Li Shunxian (Chinese: 李舜弦; c. 900, Zi Prefecture, Sichuan – 926, Sichuan) was a Former Shu poet of Persian origin celebrated for her beauty and poetic talent. She was a concubine of Wang Yan, the second and last emperor of Former Shu. She was famous for being a Persian descent with a remarkable talent for writing poetry in Chinese.

== Life ==
It is unknown whether she spoke Persian. It is also unknown whether her parents were immigrants to the Tang dynasty or were born there. Her family had adopted the Chinese surname Li. In 880, they fled the Huang Chao rebellion into Sichuan, then the western frontier of imperial China. This migration was also along with many other Chinese including Emperor Xizong. After the collapse of the Tang dynasty in 907, they rose to prominence in the court of the Former Shu Kingdom which ruled over the Sichuan region.

She had an older brother Li Xun, who was also a poet and pharmacist at the court and wrote a Chinese book on drugs. They were born in Zi Prefecture (modern-day Santai County, Sichuan). The family's Persian ethnicity is mentioned in historical texts.

As a concubine in the imperial court, Shunxian held the rank as Zhaoyi which was just below the title of Empress (consort). Her husband Wang Yan was born in 899, became emperor in 919 at 20 years old, and reigned until 924. Wang Yan was known for his indulgence in women and wine. It is speculated that Shunxian was around the same age as Wang. It was here in the harem that she began writing her well-known poetry.

The Ten-Thousand Quatrains of the Tang collected by Hong Mai contains three poems by Shunxian. In medieval China, she is the only non-Chinese woman who composed literature in Chinese. Both she and her brother were known for their poetry, and Shunxian's poems are still preserved and read today.

In 926, Shunxian, Wang Yan, and his other concubines were all brutally massacred by Emperor Zhuangzong of Later Tang.

== Religious background ==
It is believed that Li Shunxian's family was Zoroastrian because of one line in her poem mentioning a "golden bullet for a catapult" which Veshparkar, an Iranian god was known to deploy. However, other scholars such as Lo Hsiang-lin reason that they were more likely East Syriac Christians (a.k.a. "Nestorians") because in the Tang dynasty the Nestorians were known for their medicine, as her brother Li Xun was known for being an accomplished physician. Lo's idea was also supported by Chen Ming and Zhang Xushan.

== See also ==
- Iranians in China
- Liu Chang
- Lin Nu
