= Empress Gao (Former Shu) =

Chinese Empress

Empress Gao (高皇后, personal name unknown) was an empress of the Chinese Five Dynasties and Ten Kingdoms period Former Shu state. She was the first wife of Former Shu's last emperor Wang Yan (né Wang Zongyan).

== Background ==
The future Empress Gao's father was the Former Shu official Gao Zhiyan (高知言), who was known for being a minister of defense (兵部尚書, Bingbu Shangshu). She probably married Wang Zongyan while he was crown prince, as her father-in-law, the emperor Wang Jian, created her crown princess. (As he was created crown prince in 913 and became emperor in 918 upon Wang Jian's death, the marriage would have been between that period.)

== As empress ==
Upon Wang Zongyan's assumption of the throne (when he changed his name to Wang Yan), he created Crown Princess Gao empress. However, he did not favor her, particularly after he took his cousin Consort Wei as an imperial consort. In 921, he sent her back to the house of her father Gao Zhiyan, effectively deposing and divorcing her. In shock, Gao Zhiyan stopped eating and died thereafter. Nothing further was recorded in history about her.

== Notes and references ==
- Spring and Autumn Annals of the Ten Kingdoms, vol. 38.
- Zizhi Tongjian, vol. 271.

Regnal titles
Preceded by Empress Zhou	Empress of Former Shu; 918–921	Succeeded by Empress Jin Feishan
