= Empress Zhou (Former Shu) =

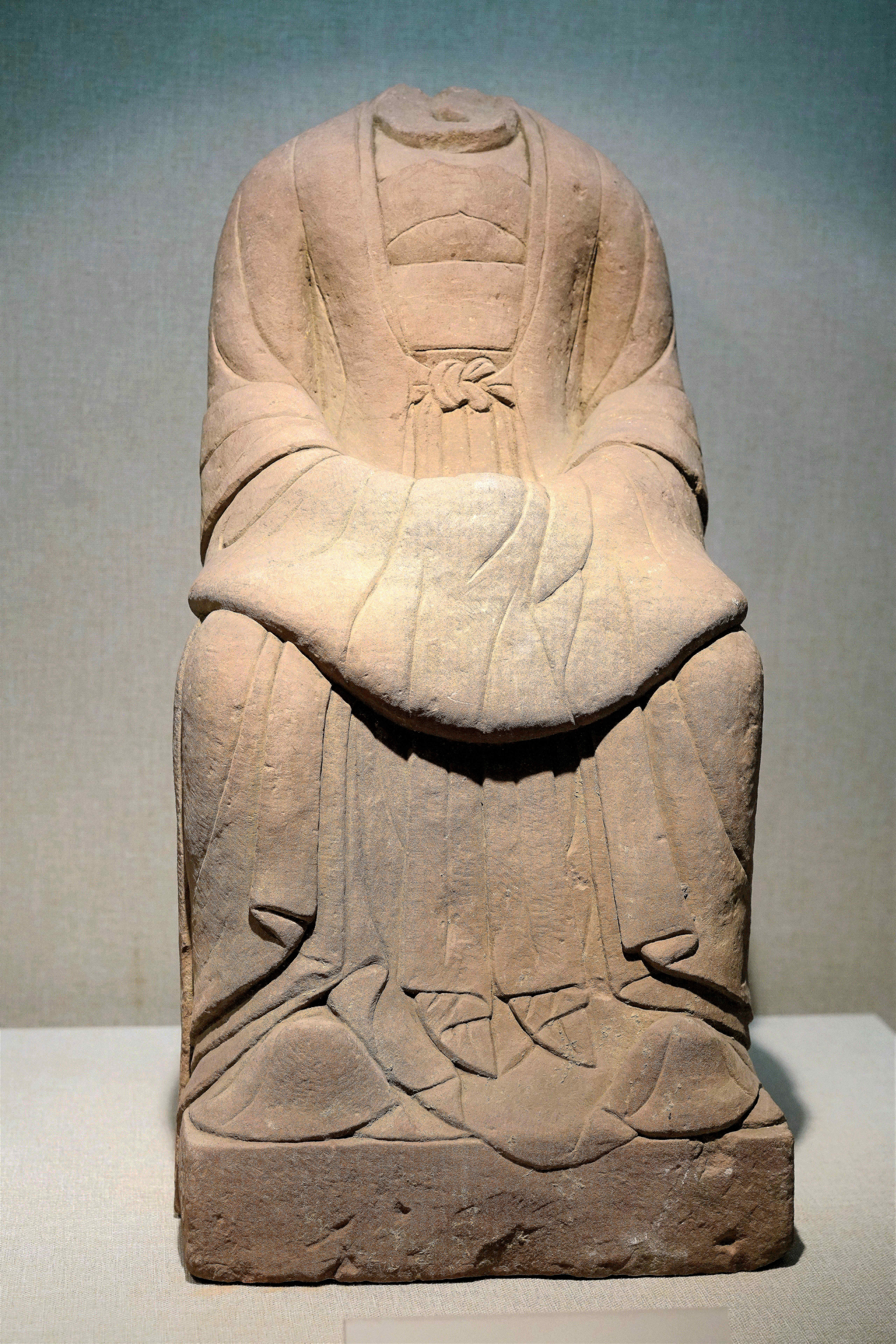
Seated statue of Empress Zhou

Empress Zhou (周皇后, personal name unknown) (died October 1, 918), formally (as her posthumous name) Empress Shunde (Chinese: 順德皇后), known as Empress Zhaosheng (Chinese: 昭聖皇后) in her lifetime, was an empress of the Chinese Five Dynasties and Ten Kingdoms period state Former Shu, as the wife of Former Shu's first emperor Wang Jian.

== Background ==
It is not known when the future Empress Zhou was born, but it is known that her family was from Xu Prefecture (許州, in modern Xuchang, Henan) — the capital of the Tang dynasty's Zhongwu Circuit (忠武), where her husband Wang Jian started his career as an army officer. It is also not known when she married Wang Jian, but given their family origins, it would appear that they were married while he was still at Zhongwu Circuit. She had at least one younger brother, Zhou Dequan (周德權), who would later become a Former Shu official.

== As empress ==
In 907, after the Tang throne, last held by Emperor Ai of Tang, was seized by Zhu Quanzhong, who established Later Liang as its Emperor Taizu, Wang Jian, who then controlled the modern Sichuan and Chongqing region and carried the title of Prince of Shu, claimed imperial title as well, establishing Former Shu. In 908, he created Lady Zhou empress. He also gave her the honorary title of Empress Zhaosheng. There was no record of her having any sons with Wang Jian.

== Death ==
Wang Jian died in 918 and was succeeded by his youngest son Wang Zongyan, born of his favorite concubine Consort Xu. Wang Yan honored his mother Consort Xu as empress dowager and honored his aunt, also a concubine to Wang Yan, as consort dowager; historical records contained no indication that he honored Empress Zhou at all other than with the empress title she still held. Empress Zhou was greatly saddened by Wang Jian's death and mourned bitterly. She died several months later and was buried at the same tomb as Wang Jian.

== Notes and references ==
- Spring and Autumn Annals of the Ten Kingdoms, vol. 38.
- Zizhi Tongjian, vols. 267, 270.

Regnal titles
Preceded by None (dynasty founded)	Empress of Former Shu; 908–918	Succeeded by Empress Gao
Preceded by Empress He of the Tang dynasty	Empress of China (Southwest); 908–918	Succeeded by Empress Gao
