= An Xuan =

2nd century Parthian translator of Buddhist texts

An Xuan (Chinese: 安玄; pinyin: Ānxuán) was a Parthian layman credited with working alongside An Shigao (Chinese: 安世高; pinyin: Ānshìgāo) and Yan Fotiao (Chinese: 嚴佛調; pinyin: Yán Fúdiào) in the translation of early Buddhist texts in Luoyang in Later Han China.

== Bibliography ==
- Nattier, Jan (2008). A Guide to the Earliest Chinese Buddhist Translations: Texts from the Eastern Han and Three Kingdoms Periods, Bibliotheca Philologica et Philosophica, IRIAB Vol. X, 89–94; ISBN 978-4-904234-00-6
