= Empress Dowager Xu =

Empress Dowager Xu (Chinese: 徐太后; personal name unknown) (died 926), honored as Empress Dowager Shunsheng (Chinese: 順聖太后) during the reign of her son Wang Yan (né Wang Zongyan), known as Consort Xu with the imperial consort rank Xianfei (徐賢妃) during the reign of her husband Wang Jian (Emperor Gaozu), was an empress dowager of the Chinese Former Shu dynasty. She was one of the favorite concubines of Wang Jian, the founder of Former Shu, and through her palace machinations was able to have her son Wang Yan (who was then named Wang Zongyan) made Wang Jian's heir. She was described as beautiful and capable of writing poems, but corrupt. After Former Shu's destruction by Later Tang, she, her son, as well as the rest of the Former Shu imperial family, were executed by Emperor Zhuangzong of Later Tang.

== Background ==
It is not known when the future Empress Dowager Xu was born. It is known that her father was Xu Geng (徐耕), who at one point served as the Tang dynasty prefect of Mei Prefecture (眉州, in modern Meishan, Sichuan) under Chen Jingxuan the military governor (Jiedushi) of Xichuan Circuit (西川, headquartered in modern Chengdu, Sichuan). Xu Geng was known for being kind and benevolent while serving under Chen, and during Chen's struggles against Wang Jian in 891 as Wang sieged Xichuan's capital Chengdu Municipality, Xu Geng spared many people who considered surrendering to Wang. She was Xu Geng's oldest daughter, and both she and her younger sister (who would also become a concubine to Wang Jian) were very beautiful.

== As imperial consort ==
It is not known when the future Empress Dowager Xu became Wang Jian's concubine, but it is known that in 908, shortly after he declared himself the Emperor Shu and created his wife Lady Zhou as his empress, he created both her (who became known as Consort Xu the Greater) and her sister (who became known as Consort Xu the Lesser) as imperial consorts — her title being Xianfei (賢妃) and her sister's title being Defei (德妃). (Consort Xu the Lesser would later receive the title of Shufei.) Both of them became Wang Jian's favorites, and Consort Xu the Greater would bear Wang Jian's youngest of 11 sons, Wang Zongyan the Prince of Zheng, The Consorts Xu formed a close alliance with the eunuch Tang Wenyi (唐文扆) and influenced Wang Jian's policy decisions.

In 913, Wang Jian's first crown prince Wang Yuanying, believing that the powerful official Tang Daoxi was about to attack him, attacked and killed Tang Daoxi first. Subsequently, Wang Jian's imperial troops struck back, and Wang Yuanying was killed. AFter Wang Yuanying's death, Wang Jian considered whom to create as crown prince, and initially considered Wang Zonglu (王宗輅) the Prince of Ya (whom he considered to be very much like himself) and Wang Zongjie (王宗傑) the Prince of Xin (whom he considered highly talented). However, Consort Xu the Greater wanted her son Wang Zongyan to become crown prince, and therefore had Tang Wenyi persuade the chancellor Zhang Ge to support Wang Zongyan. Zhang, in turn, falsely informed all of the major officials that Wang Jian had already settled on Wang Zongyan and that they should submit petitions supporting Wang Zongyan. The major officials did so. Wang Jian, even though he doubted Wang Zongyan's abilities, thought that the officials in fact all supported Wang Zongyan. He thus created Wang Zongyan crown prince. (Wang Jian would later despise Zhang after he realized what Zhang did, particularly because he considered Wang Zongyan overly indulgent in feasting and games, but with Consort Xu the Greater having so much influence on his governance, he allowed Zhang to remain chancellor despite his anger at Zhang.)

== As empress dowager ==
Wang Jian died in 918, and Wang Zongyan took the throne (and changed his name to Wang Yan). He honored his mother Consort Xu the Greater as empress dowager and his aunt Consort Xu the Lesser as consort dowager. It was said that Wang Yan, Empress Dowager Xu, and Consort Dowager Xu often spent much time visiting the nobles' mansions, at great expense; further, Empress Dowager Xu and Consort Dowager Xu both made offices positions for sale, including offices as high as prefect positions, allowing people to post bids and accepting the high bids.

In 920, when the minor official Zhang Shiqiao (張士喬) tried to correct Wang Yan's overindulgence in his sacrifices to his father Wang Jian's temple, Wang Yan wanted to put Zhang to death. It was only at Empress Dowager Xu's intercession that Zhang was only exiled. (However, Zhang committed suicide on the way to exile.) She later allowed him to take her niece as an imperial consort, although, as he did not want to familial relationship to be known, he changed her niece's name to Wei, claiming that Consort Wei was a granddaughter of the Tang chancellor Wei Zhaodu.

In fall 925, Wang Yan, Empress Dowager Xu, and Consort Dowager Xu left Chengdu and toured Mount Qingcheng. They then continued their tour and went as far as Peng (彭州, in modern Chengdu) and Han (漢州, in modern Deyang, Sichuan) before returning to Chengdu — this, while (without their knowledge) Former Shu's northern neighbor Later Tang was preparing a major military operation to destroy Former Shu. Subsequently, Wang Yan wanted to tour as far as Qin Prefecture (秦州, in modern Tianshui, Gansu); Empress Dowager Xu tried to stop him by refusing to eat, but even her actions could not stop him from leaving Chengdu, leaving the empire completely unprepared for the subsequent Later Tang assault, commanded by Li Jiji the Prince of Wei (the oldest son of Later Tang's Emperor Zhuangzong) and the major general Guo Chongtao. Within two months, the Former Shu troops suffered many losses, which mounted even after Wang Yan returned to Chengdu. Believing that Former Shu was doomed, the major general Wang Zongbi (Wang Yan's adoptive brother) seized control of Chengdu, in effect holding Wang Yan and the imperial household under house arrest, before Wang Yan formally surrendered the empire to Li Jiji and Guo.

== Death ==
Emperor Zhuangzong initially made assurances that Wang Yan, by virtue of his surrender, would be given an honorable title as a Later Tang subject. He required them to leave Chengdu, however, and head for the Later Tang capital Luoyang. As Wang Yan and his household reached Chang'an in spring 926, however, the Later Tang empire was beginning to be enveloped by various mutinies led by generals and soldiers dissatisfied at Emperor Zhuangzong's failures to reward them for their contributions during the Former Shu campaign and his earlier campaign to destroy Later Liang and fearful of death (after Li Jiji killed Guo Chongtao in early 926 and Emperor Zhuangzong killed Zhu Youqian around the same time due to fears that they would revolt), and Emperor Zhuangzong ordered Wang Yan to halt at Chang'an for some time.

Soon thereafter, with Later Tang's northern circuits seized by yet another mutiny, led by the major general, Li Siyuan, Emperor Zhuangzong's favorite court performer, Jing Jin (景進), persuaded Emperor Zhuangzong that, as Wang had more than 1,000 people following him on the trek to Luoyang, he might mutiny as well. Emperor Zhuangzong therefore issued orders to eunuch Xiang Yansi (向延嗣) to have Wang and his household put to death. It was said that as Empress Dowager Xu was to be executed, she cried out in cursing Emperor Zhuangzong, "My son surrendered an empire to you but could not avoid having his clan slaughtered. You abandoned your faith and your righteousness, and I know that you will soon suffer disaster as well!" (Her curse came true, as mutineers supporting Li Siyuan would rise at Luoyang shortly after, killing Emperor Zhuangzong in battle.)

== Notes and references ==
- Spring and Autumn Annals of the Ten Kingdoms, vol. 38.
- Zizhi Tongjian, vols. 267, 268, 270, 271, 273, 274.
