= Chen Jue (Southern Tang) =

Chinese official

Chen Jue (陳覺) (died 959?) was a key official of the Chinese Five Dynasties and Ten Kingdoms Period states Wu and Wu's successor state Southern Tang, becoming chief of staff to Southern Tang's second emperor Li Jing. He was considered an ally of the senior statesman Song Qiqiu, and after Song lost power, Chen was exiled and killed on the way to exile.

== During Wu ==
It is not known when Chen Jue was born, but it is known that he was from Hailing (海陵, in modern Taizhou, Jiangsu). His family background was not stated in traditional historical sources. The first reference to him was in 932, when then-Wu regent Xu Zhigao established a Lixian Hall (禮賢院, "hall where one respects the virtuous") at his headquarters in Jinling, and it was said that he often spoke on the events of the times with both Chen and Sun Sheng.

In 934, Xu Zhigao recalled his oldest son Xu JIngtong, who had been serving as the junior regent, in control of the Wu imperial government at the Wu capital Jiangdu, from Jiangdu, to serve as his own deputy. He sent his second son, Xu Jingqian, to Jiangdu to replace Xu Jingtong in overseeing the Wu government. Shortly after, in 935, Xu Zhigao instructed Chen Jue, who was then serving as a supervisory official at the executive bureau of government (尚書省, Shangshu Sheng), to assist Xu Jingqian, relaying to Chen the stories of his friendship with the chief strategist Song Qiqiu, stemming from their youth, that allowed their relationship to thrive despite their frequent disagreements. He wanted Chen to become that kind of a friend with Xu Jingqian. However, Xu Jingqian fell ill in 936, and was replaced by his brother Xu Jingsui. Apparently, after that, Chen returned to Xu Zhigao's staff. (Xu Jingqian would die from his illness in 937.)

== During Southern Tang ==
=== During Li Bian's reign ===
In 937, Xu Zhigao had the Wu emperor Yang Pu yield the throne to him, ending Wu and starting Southern Tang as its emperor. According to the Spring and Autumn Annals of the Ten Kingdoms, Chen Jue then served as the deputy director of palace affairs (宣徽副使, Xuanhui Fushi), although according to the Zizhi Tongjian, he was just the deputy director of one palace hall, Guangzheng Hall (光政殿). (According to the Zizhi Tongjian, it was not until 941 that he was made the deputy director of palace affairs, along with Chang Mengxi (常夢錫).) In 940, when Xu Zhigao — who had changed his name to Li Bian by that point — was persuaded by the sorcerer Sun Zhiyong (孫智永) to visit Jiangdu, Chen accompanied him. It was said that previously, Chen carried a grudge against Chu Rengui (禇仁規) the prefect of Tai Prefecture (泰州, in modern Taizhou), which Hailing belonged to, because he had once whipped Chen's older brother, who continued to live in Hailing, for a crime. Chen used this occasion to accuse Chu of being corrupt and cruel. Li Bian, believing him, removed Chu from his post and gave him a mere officer position. This was described as the start of Chen's abuse of power. (The Spring and Autumn Annals of the Ten Kingdoms further stated that when Chu submitted a petition to defend himself, Li Bian sent Chen to adjudicate the matter, causing Chu to become so fearful that he confessed to crimes, and was subsequently ordered to commit suicide.)

By 943, it was said that Chen was in alliance with Song Qiqiu and Feng Yanji, exerting influence over Li Bian's oldest son and presumed heir Li Jing the Prince of Qi and finding ways to expel people who were not cooperating with them. Both Chang and Xiao Yan (蕭儼) submitted petitions to Li Bian accusing Chen of abuse of power, and it was said that while Li Bian understood some of the accusations to be true, he did not get a chance to act on them, before he fell deathly ill from poisoning due to pills given him by alchemists. (It was said that because of these pills, his temperament had grown violent the few months before his death, such that even close associates were being punished. Chen, seeing this, claimed to be ill himself and was not in Li Bian's presence during that period.) Li Bian designated Li Jing as his heir, and then died. Li Jing succeeded him as emperor. (Upon Li Bian's death, Chen immediately "recovered" and returned to duty, causing Xiao to submit a petition to Li Jing calling for his punishment. Li Jing declined.)

=== During Li Jing's reign ===
After Li Jing took the throne, it was said that because both Song Qiqiu and Li Jing himself considered Chen Jue talented, he was given much responsibilities. He formed a faction at the Southern Tang court, in alliance with Feng Yanji, Feng Yanji's brother Feng Yanlu (馮延魯), Wei Cen (魏岑), and Cha Wenhui (查文徽), such that their detractors referred to them as the "Five Ghosts." However, after a short time, Wei and Cha were promoted to be Li Jing's deputy chiefs of staff (樞密副使, Shumi Fushi), and Chen's mother happened to die around that time, forcing him to leave the imperial government to observe a period of mourning. Wei, believing his power was secure, began to publicize Chen's faults, trying to prevent Chen from returning to power. With Chen out of power, Song also lost power in a struggle against fellow senior chancellor Zhou Zong, and went into retirement.

==== The Fu Prefecture campaign ====
However, by 946 — although timing was not completely clear — Chen not only had returned to the Southern Tang government, but was serving as chief of staff (Shumishi). That year, Southern Tang was facing the aftermaths of what to do with the remnants of the territory of its southeastern neighbor Min, whose last emperor Wang Yanzheng had surrendered to Southern Tang in 945 after the Southern Tang army commanded by Cha had captured Min's then-capital Jian Prefecture (建州, in modern Nanping, Fujian). However, the larger city of Fu Prefecture (福州, in modern Fuzhou, Fujian), was in the hands of Li Hongyi, who was a nominal Southern Tang vassal but was ruling the region in de facto independence. The generals under Cha had advocated attacking Fu, but Li Jing initially was hesitant. Chen volunteered to head to Fu himself, with Song (who had also returned to the Southern Tang imperial government) supporting him and promising that he would be able to persuade Li Hongyi into surrendering his territory and report to Jinling. Li Jing thus, after issuing edicts creating Li Hongyi's mother and wife honored lady titles and giving his four younger brothers higher positions, sent Chen to Fu to try to persuade Li Hongyi to surrender his territory. Li Hongyi, however, realized what Chen was up to, and therefore, when Chen arrived, dealt with him arrogantly. Chen did not dare to even bring up the topic of having him report to Jinling, before departing Fu.

Embarrassed by his failure, Chen, on the way back to Jinling, changed his mind when he reached Jian Prefecture (劍州, note different location than the former Min capital, but also in modern Nanping), claiming that he had been authorized by Li Jing, issued orders mobilizing forces from Jian (former Min capital), Ting (汀州, in modern Longyan, Fujian, Fu (撫州, note different location than Li Hongyi's seat of power, in modern Fuzhou, Jiangxi), and Xin (信州, in modern Shangrao, Jiangxi), putting them under the command of Feng Yanlu, who was then serving as the monitor of the Yong'an Circuit (永安, headquartered at the former Min capital Jian Prefecture) army, and ordering Feng to attack. Feng's attack was initially successful, but when he was sieging Fu, Li Hongyi repelled him. Li Jing was outraged by Chen's falsification of imperial orders, but the other officials largely believed that the only action now was to support Chen's campaign. Li Jing thus put Yong'an's military governor (Jiedushi) Wang Chongwen (王崇文) in command of a larger army, with Wei and Feng serving as his deputies, in attacking Fu.

The Southern Tang army under Wang put Fu under siege, and it was said that the situation inside the city was desperate, even with an army from Wuyue aiding Li Hongyi (who had changed his name by that point to Li Da to observe naming taboo for Wuyue's king Qian Hongzuo). However, it was said that the siege itself bogged down because Wei, Feng, and Chen were all trying to demonstrate their own abilities, and Wang Jianfeng (王建封) the prefect of Xin and Liu Congxiao the prefect of Quan Prefecture (泉州, in modern Quanzhou, Fujian), were not following Wang Chongwen's orders. In 947, another Wuyue fleet arrived, commanded by the Wuyue general Yu An (余安), but the Wuyue soldiers were unable to land to aid Fu because of arrows fired from Southern Tang archers from land. Feng, however, believing that he could crush the Wuyue army once it landed, decided to halt the archers. Once the Wuyue soldiers landed, they fought with high intensity, that Feng was forced to flee. Once he did, the Southern Tang army sieging Fu from the south panicked and collapsed. Wang Chongwen was forced to personally protect the rear guard to allow most of them to escape. Wang Jianfeng, stationed to Fu's southeast, decided to withdraw as well, as did the Southern Tang army to the north. Feng tried to commit suicide with his sword, but was saved by his subordinates. The end result were 20,000 Southern Tang deaths and the draining the imperial treasury.

Li Jing blamed the defeat on Chen and Feng Yanlu for their acting without imperial authorization, and pardoned all of the other generals, but considered executing them. However, the official Jiang Wenwei (江文蔚), who hated Chen's party, then submitted a harshly worded petition calling for punishment to be rendered against Feng Yanji and Wei as well. Jiang's wording was so bitter that it offended Li Jing, who exiled him. After Chen and Feng Yanlu were delivered to Jinling, Song submitted a petition blaming himself for recommending Chen, but implicitly taking on responsibility instead of them. Chen and Feng Yanlu ended up only being exiled, with Chen being exiled to Qi Prefecture (蘄州, in modern Huanggang, Hubei), despite calls from Xu Xuan (徐鉉) and Han Xizai for their deaths as well.

==== War with Later Zhou ====
However, after a year, Chen Jue was recalled to the imperial government, and apparently resumed his role as chief of staff. He became closely allied with Li Zhenggu (李徵古), who would be his deputy chief of staff.

As of 956, Southern Tang was deeply engaged in a war, defending itself against a major Later Zhou invasion. With Later Zhou forces inflicting great losses on the Southern Tang forces, Li Jing successively sent two peace delegations, the first one headed by Zhong Mo (鍾謨) and Li Deming (李德明), and one headed by Sun Sheng and Wang Chongzhi (王崇直), to the camp of the Later Zhou emperor Guo Rong, making the offer that 1) he would discontinuing claiming himself to be an emperor and 2) Southern Tang would cede six prefectures (Shou (壽州, in modern Lu'an, Anhui), Hao (濠州, in modern Chuzhou, Anhui), Si (泗州, in modern Huai'an, Jiangsu), Chu (楚州, in modern Huai'an), Guang (光州, in modern Xinyang, Henan), and Hai (海州, in modern Lianyungang, Jiangsu). However, Guo was not satisfied with this offer, and wanted all of the land north of the Yangtze River. Li Deming, worried about the continued Later Zhou gains, requested to return to the Southern Tang court to try to persuade Li Jing to cede all of the land north of the Yangtze, and Guo agreed, sending him and Wang back to the Southern Tang court to do so. However, upon Li Deming's return to the Southern Tang court, his report about the Later Zhou military strength displeased Li Jing. Song Qiqiu also argued that ceding land was useless. Chen and Li Zhenggu had long disliked Li Deming and Sun, and therefore induced Wang into making a report contradicting Li Deming; Chen and Li Zhenggu then accused Li Deming of selling the state out. Li Jing, believing them, executed Li Deming.

With the peace process dying, for the time, with Li Deming's execution, Li Jing launched a major counterattack, nominally commanded by his brother Li Jingda the Prince of Qi, but with Chen as the army monitor and in actual control of the decisions — such that historical accounts stated that all Li Jingda ended up doing was signing documents. With the general Zhu Yuan (朱元) successful in recapturing some cities that Later Zhou had previously captured, in fall 956, Li Jingda's army advanced to Hao, not far from Shou, which had been under Later Zhou siege ever since the war started in 955. However, it was said that even though there were 50,000 soldiers under Li Jingda and Chen, Chen made no attempt to try to lift the siege on Shou. The generals and officers under him were said to be so fearful of him that they did not dare to speak up.

By spring 957, Chen and Zhu had been in frequent conflicts, as Zhu, arrogant because of his victories over Later Zhou forces, was resisting orders issued by Li Jingda (most likely actually issued by Chen). Chen thus submitted a petition to Li Jing, arguing that Zhu was untrustworthy and should not be allowed to continue to command an army. Li Jing sent the general Yang Shouzhong (楊守忠) to replace Zhu, and Chen summoned Zhu to his then-headquarters at Hao, planning to relieve him of his command there. Zhu, instead, defected to Later Zhou with his army. Guo Rong himself subsequently defeated and captured Southern Tang generals Yang, Xu Wenzhen (許文稹), and Bian Hao. Li Jingda's army collapsed, and he and Chen fled back to Jinling. With Shou's defender, Liu Renshan (劉仁瞻) the military governor of Qinghuai Circuit (清淮, headquartered at Shou) deathly ill, Shou's garrison surrendered, effectively ending Southern Tang resistance along the Huai River.

As of spring 958, Later Zhou forces were heading for the Yangtze, with Guo himself advancing to Yingluan (迎鑾, in modern Yangzhou, Jiangsu), and Li Jing feared that they would advance further south. He thus sent Chen to head a peace delegation to Guo, offering to submit as a vassal. When Chen himself witnessed the strength of the Later Zhou emperor's army, he requested that he be allowed to send a deputy back to Jinling to persuade Li Jing to cede the four remaining prefectures north of the Yangtze still held by Southern Tang — Lu (廬州, in modern Hefei, Anhui), Shu (舒州, in modern Anqing, Anhui), Qin, and Huang (黃州, in modern Huanggang). Guo agreed, and Chen sent the officer Liu Chengyu (劉承遇) to Jinling to do so. Li Jing subsequently sent Liu back to Guo's camp, agreeing to do so. Guo then allowed Chen to return to Southern Tang, and had him express to Li Jing that he needed not (as he also offered) pass his throne to his son, Li Hongji the Crown Prince.

==== Fall and death ====
Upon the peace settlement, Li Jing reduced his own use of imperial trappings, including referring to himself as Guozhu (國主, "lord of the state") instead of emperor, and ending the use of his own era name, in favor of Later Zhou's. He also reduced the ranks of the titles of his officials. As part of this process, Chen Jue was stripped of his chief of staff title, and only thereafter carried his lesser title of deputy minister of defense (兵部侍郎, Bingbu Shilang).

Meanwhile, in light of the defeat, Li Jing was in a depressed state. The group of officials in Song Qiqiu's party began advocating that he take a leave from being emperor, and let Song serve as regent — a proposal that Li Jing was displeased about, but outwardly expressed no disapproval. Meanwhile, after Zhong Mo also returned from the Later Zhou court, he, who had a deep friendship with Li Deming, hated Song's party for their role in Li Deming's death. He secretly accused Song of planning to usurp the throne, and Chen and Li Zhenggu of being in league with Song. Chen, who was also inimical with the chancellor Yan Xu, also exacerbated the situation by falsely informing Li Jing that Guo Rong, believing that Yan was the advocate for resisting Later Zhou, wanted Yan executed. Li Jing, knowing of the enmity between Chen and Yan, decided to send Zhong back to the Later Zhou court to verify with Guo. When Zhong returned, verifying that Guo made no such request, Li Jing sent Zhong to Guo again, to request permission to execute Song and his party. Guo declined a response, believing that it was Southern Tang's internal affair.

Around the new year 959, Li Jing acted. He issued an edict declaring the crimes of Song's party. The edict ordered Song into retirement, demoted Chen to the post of professor at the imperial university (國子博士, Guozhi Boshi) but exiling him to Xuan Prefecture (宣州, in modern Xuancheng, Anhui), and ordered Li Zhenggu to commit suicide. On Chen's way to Xuan, Li Jing sent a messenger to have him executed.

== Notes and references ==
- Spring and Autumn Annals of the Ten Kingdoms, vol. 26.
- Zizhi Tongjian, vols. 277, 279, 282, 283, 285, 286, 293, 294.
