= Tangzhou =

Tangzhou may refer to:

- Tangzhou, Jiangxi (塘洲), a town in Taihe County, Jiangxi, China
- Tang Prefecture (唐州) in Henan
- Tang Prefecture (唐州) in Shanxi

== See also ==
- Tang (disambiguation)
