= Li Jinquan =

Li Jinquan (李金全)

Personal details
- Born: 880s or early 890 likely Hedong Circuit, Tang
- Died: 950 or early 951 Jinling, Southern Tang
- Children: 32

Li Jinquan
- Chinese: 李金全
Transcriptions
Standard Mandarin
- Hanyu Pinyin: Lǐ Jīnquán
- Wade–Giles: Li Chin-ch'üan

Li Jinquan (died circa 950) was a military general during the Five Dynasties period, serving successively the Jin–Later Tang, Later Jin, and Southern Tang dynasties. He was of Tuyuhun ethnicity.

Li is best known for his 940 revolt against the Later Jin, after which he fled to Southern Tang. Later Jin demolished the Southern Tang force sent to receive him, and from this point on Southern Tang never dared to encroach on Central Plains again.

== Early life ==
Li Jinquan was born in the 880s during the Tang dynasty. Originally a menial servant of the Shatuo general Li Siyuan, Li Jinquan was described as fearless and skilled in mounted archery. As Li Siyuan served the warlords Li Keyong and his son Li Cunxu, Li Jinquan also fought in battles and won military merits. The Shatuo state, known as Jin after the Tang's collapse in 907, became Later Tang in 923.

== Under Later Tang ==
After Li Siyuan became Later Tang's emperor in 926, he appointed Li Jinquan military commissioner of Longwu (龍武), seated in Jing Prefecture in the western part of the empire. Li Jinquan's governance was greedy and oppressive. Following his recall to the capital Luoyang, he presented dozens of horses to Li Siyuan (then renamed Li Dan) as a gift, followed by another herd a few days later. This shocked the emperor, who questioned him: "You must suffer from a plentitude of horses. Why else would you offer so many? Moreover, you serve at Jing Prefecture. How would you characterize conditions there? Surely, you do more than merely trade in horses?" Li Jinquan was too ashamed to reply.

Li Jinquan later governed Henghai (橫海), seated in Cang Prefecture in the northeast. He was again recalled to the capital to command the "Right Guard" of the imperial guards at some point.

== Under Later Jin ==
Later Jin replaced Later Tang in 936, and Li Jinquan retained his position with the imperial guards. On 3 September 937, Wang Hui (王暉), director for defense reserves at An Prefecture, assassinated Zhou Gui (周瑰), military commissioner of Anyuan (安遠). Anyuan, seated in An Prefecture, was in the southern part of the empire bordering Wu to the southeast. Later Jin's emperor Shi Jingtang, busily fighting the rebellion of Fan Yanguang in the north, could not afford to battle on two fronts. Therefore, he issued a "letter-on-arrow" against slaughtering a single person in Anyuan, while also promising Wang Hui governorship of Tang Prefecture if he surrendered. He then sent Li Jinquan with a 1000-man cavalry to Anyuan to induce Wang Hui's surrender, and before Li's departure, admonished him: "Do not compromise my credibility!".

Indeed, Wang was about to flee to Wu, but he was killed by a subordinate before Li Jinquan arrived in An Prefecture. Li arrested hundreds of mutineers and delivered them back to the capital. As Wang Hui had looted An Prefecture for 3 days, many of his officers acquired large numbers of properties. Li Jinquan then executed dozens of such officers to appropriate their wealth for himself. One such officer, Wu Kehe (武克和), cried out before his execution: "If you, commander, contravene imperial rescripts to kill surrendering soldiers, then you may not escape peril yourself!" Even though Shi Jingtang heard about Li's disobedience, he could not do anything. Instead, to appease Li, he appointed him military commissioner of Anyuan on 11 October 937.

In Anyuan, Li Jinquan entrusted a greedy and immoral man named Hu Hanyun (胡漢筠) with the day-to-day operations of the military and government. After Shi Jingtang heard of Hu Hanyun's excesses, he sent an honest administrator named Jia Renzhao (賈仁沼) to Anyuan to replace Hu. Hu was terrified, so he persuaded Li Jingquan to submit a memorial which claimed that Hu was ill and could not be recalled to the capital. Pang Lingtu (龐令圖), who hailed from the same hometown as Li Jinquan, repeated advised Li to appoint Jia Renzhao. Hu Hanyun then sent soldiers to massacre Pang Lingtu's entire family. He also poisoned Jia Renzhao to death. Because Hu Hanyun colluded with the flatterer Zhang Wei (張緯), Li Jingquan knew nothing of his wrongdoings and trusted him more than ever.

In summer of 940, Shi Jingtang decided to replace Li Jinquan with Ma Quanjie (馬全節). Knowing Jia Renzhao's sons would file court complaints for their father's murder, Hu Hanyun warned Li Jinquan of the possible punishment he would also face in the capital: "Formerly, the Son of Heaven summoned me, but you violated imperial orders by refusing to relieve me." Li Jinquan then prepared to rebel. Having heard the news, on 29 June 940, Shi Jingtang named Ma Quanjie the overall commander of the punitive force against Li Jinquan. The soldiers of this force came from 12 prefectures.

At that time, Wu had already been replaced by Southern Tang, and Li Jinquan sent Zhang Wei to Southern Tang to offer his surrender. Southern Tang's emperor Li Bian then commissioned a 3000-man force under general Li Chengyu (李承裕) and Duan Chugong (段處恭) to receive Li Jinquan from E Prefecture. Li Jinquan and his hundreds of soldiers surrendered without a problem, and Li Chengyu got hold of his women and wealth as well. Feeling overconfident, Li Chengyu disobeyed Li Bian's orders and plundered An Prefecture, acquiring items of "gold and silk too numerous to count". When the Southern Tang army finally retreated, they were caught up by the Later Jin army. In the bloody two-day battle that followed, Duan Chugong was killed, while Li Chengyu was captured. Ma Quanjie executed Li Chengyu and thousands of Southern Tang soldiers. Li Jinquan managed to escape and it was said once he entered Southern Tang territory, he looked north and shed tears. He received a rather cool reception in Southern Tang.

== Under Southern Tang ==
Under Southern Tang, Li Jinquan served as the commander general of Tianwei (天成) and military commissioner of Zhenhai (鎮海) seated in Run Prefecture.

In 947, Later Han succeeded Later Jin (with a short period of Liao dynasty interregnum). In 948, general Li Shouzhen (who was under Ma Quanjie's command in 940) rebelled against Later Han in its western parts of the empire and requested help from Southern Tang. General Liu Yanzhen (劉彥貞) volunteered to lead an expeditionary force, but Southern Tang's emperor Li Jing considered Li Jinquan more prestigious, so Li Jinquan was named the overall commander of the northern expedition army with Liu Yanzhen assisting him. Li Jinquan considered Li Shouzhen's forces too far to make any coordinated efforts, and as a result the deployment was permanently postponed, even as reports indicated only hundreds of weak Later Han soldiers guarding the northern garrisons. When other generals suggested advancing, Li Jinquan said, "Whoever mentions advancing will be executed!" It turned out that there was indeed an ambush by Later Han, and when the other generals learned of this that evening, they began to respect Li Jinquan.

A month later, Li Jinquan was recalled and sent to Hai Prefecture. Subsequently, he received other major posts, until his death in 950 in the Southern Tang capital of Jinling.

== Notes and references ==
- Kurz, Johannes L. (2011). China's Southern Tang Dynasty, 937–976. Routledge. ISBN 978-0-415-45496-4.
- Standen, Naomi (2009). "The Five Dynasties". In Twitchett, Denis; Smith, Paul Jakov (eds.). The Cambridge History of China, Volume 5, Part One: The Sung Dynasty and Its Precursors, 907–1279. Cambridge University Press. ISBN 978-0-521-81248-1.
- Ouyang Xiu (2004). Historical Records of the Five Dynasties. Translated by Richard L. Davis. Columbia University Press. ISBN 0-231-12826-6.
- Ouyang Xiu (1073). Wudai Shiji (五代史記) [Historical Records of the Five Dynasties] (in Chinese).
- Sima Guang (1086). Zizhi Tongjian (資治通鑑) [Comprehensive Mirror for Aid in Government] (in Chinese).
- Wu Renchen (1669). Shiguo Chunqiu (十國春秋) [Springs and Autumns of the Ten States] (in Chinese).
