= Princess Yongxing =

Fourth daughter of Li Bian (917–940)

Princess Yongxing of Southern Tang
- Born: 917; Unknown, Wu
- Died: 940; Jinling, Southern Tang
- Spouse: Yang Lian (937–940)
- House: Southern Tang (by blood), Wu (by marriage)
- Father: Li Bian (Xu Zhigao, Xu Gao)

Lady Xu (徐氏, personal name unknown, 917–940), better known as Princess Yongxing (永興公主), was the fourth daughter of Li Bian (known as Xu Zhigao or Xu Gao during her life), the usurper who seized power from the Wu dynasty ruling house to found the Southern Tang dynasty. Princess Yongxing had married the Wu crown prince Yang Lian, and after the usurpation in 937 she stayed loyal to him even though she was elevated to a princess while he was demoted to "Commandery Duke of Hongnong". It has been said that she inevitably started crying every time people mentioned her by the new title "princess", conferred by her father, much to the chagrin of her older brother Li Jing (then known as Xu Jing). Her father reportedly called her a "good wife". When Yang Lian was banished to Chi Prefecture, she followed him there. She died at age 24 "without an illness" shortly after her husband died under suspicious circumstances (likely murdered by her father).
