= Yang Lian =

Yang Lian may refer to:

- Yang Lian (prince) (died 940), prince of Wu during the Five Dynasties and Ten Kingdoms period
- Yang Lian (poet) (born 1955), Swiss-born Chinese poet
- Yang Lian (weightlifter) (born 1982), Chinese weightlifter
