= Sun Sheng =

Sun Sheng may refer to:

- Sun Sheng (Jin dynasty) (孫盛) (302–373), historian of imperial China's Jin Dynasty
- Sun Sheng (Southern Tang) (孫晟) (died 956), chancellor of imperial China's Southern Tang Dynasty

== See also ==
- Sun Sheng Xi (born 1990), Taiwanese-Korean singer-songwriter
