= Sun Sheng (Southern Tang) =

10th-century Chinese politician and general

Sun Sheng (孫晟) (died December 21, 956), né Sun Feng (孫鳳), known as Sun Ji (孫忌) at one point, formally Duke Wenzhong of Lu (魯文忠公), was an official of the Chinese Five Dynasties and Ten Kingdoms Period states Later Tang, Wu, and Southern Tang, serving as a chancellor during the reign of Southern Tang's second emperor Li Jing. When the Southern Tang came under attack by its northern neighbor Later Zhou, Li Jing sent him as an emissary to Later Zhou to try to persuade Later Zhou's emperor Guo Rong to end his campaign, but Guo, after being unable to get Sun to give him secrets of the Southern Tang state, executed him.

== Background ==
It is not known when Sun Sheng was born (under the name of Sun Feng), but it is known that he was from Gaomi. He was also known as Sun Ji at one point, but later came to be named Sun Sheng. In his young days, he was said to be studious and capable of writing, particularly at poetry.

Also, during his youth, Sun passed the imperial examinations in the Jinshi class. (It is unclear whether this was in the late Tang dynasty or early in its successor state Later Liang.) At that time, however, the intelligentsia at then-capital Luoyang favored men who paid attention to details and appearance, and Sun did not pay attention to such things, and therefore was not regarded highly. He thus left the capital scene and journeyed to Mount Lu to become a Taoist monk at Jianji Temple (簡寂宮). However, his custom of hanging up a portrait of the Tang poet Jia Dao and offering sacrifices to the portrait caused fellow monks to believe that he was a sorcerer, and they chased him out of the temple. He then changed back into the robes of a scholar, and went north to Later Liang's northern rival Jin, meeting Jin's prince Li Cunxu at Zhen Prefecture (鎮州, in modern Shijiazhuang, Hebei), although it was not stated whether Li gave him any positions in the government at that time.

== During Later Tang ==
In 923, Li Cunxu claimed imperial title of a new Later Tang, and shortly after destroyed Later Liang and took over its territory. One of the chancellors he commissioned for his new imperial government was Doulu Ge. Doulu had long known of Sun Sheng's capability, and he retained Sun to serve as a secretary to him, and Sun later received the title of Zhuzuo Zuolang (著作佐郎), as an assistant editor at the Palace Library.

As of 927, by which time Li Cunxu had died and been succeeded by his adoptive brother Li Siyuan as emperor, Sun was serving as a secretary to Zhu Shouyin the military governor (Jiedushi) of Xuanwu Circuit (宣武, headquartered in modern Kaifeng, Henan). In winter 927, Li Siyuan suddenly announced that he was going to visit Xuanwu's capital Bian Prefecture (汴州) from the imperial capital Luoyang, leading to two rumors — either that he was intending to launch a major attack on Later Tang's southeastern neighbor Wu, or that he was going to act against one of the rebellious governors to the east. Sun suggested to Zhu that he resist the emperor, and Zhu agreed, closing the city and preparing to defend it. However, Li Siyuan's generals Fan Yanguang and Shi Jingtang quickly arrived at Bian before its defenses could be fully ready and began the siege, and when Li Siyuan himself shortly arrived thereafter and continued the siege in earnest, the people of Bian began to desert Zhu in droves. Zhu committed suicide.

Sun, meanwhile, abandoned his wife and children, and hid himself in the region. Li Siyuan's chief of staff An Chonghui hated him for encouraging Zhu's rebellion, and therefore put out reward posters for his arrest, but could not have him arrested, and therefore slaughtered his family. Sun fled to Zhengyang (正陽, on the border of modern Fuyang and Lu'an, Anhui), on the border between Later Tang and Wu. Before he could cross the Huai River into Wu territory, however, he was intercepted by suspicious Later Tang border guards. He sat on the bank of the Huai and acted crazy by grabbing his clothes and eating the fleas thereon, so the guards ignored him. He thereafter crossed the river into Wu territory.

== During Wu ==
Upon entering Wu territory, Sun Sheng was taken in by the Wu military governor of Fengguo Circuit (奉國, headquartered in modern Lu'an), Liu Jin (劉金). For reasons not explained in history, Sun pretended to be unable to speak when Liu spoke with him. However, one day, when Sun went to pray at the temple of the Han dynasty prince Liu An, Liu Jin had someone hide under Liu An's statue to listen to Sun's prayers, and therefore found out more about him. Liu Jin thereafter had him delivered to Jinling, where the headquarters of the Wu regent Xu Zhigao was.

At that time, Xu was trying to gather all kinds of talented people to serve on his staff and was glad to have Sun added to his staff. It was said that Sun spoke with a stutter, but once he had a chance to talk with people further, he communicated effectively and persuasively. Xu favored him greatly and had him be in charge of drafting Xu's orders. Xu also consulted him secretly on Xu's plans to eventually take over the Wu throne, and each time they spoke, they spoke for over two hours, but Sun was able to keep secrets and not reveal what Xu was talking with him about. In 932, when Xu established a Lixian Hall at his headquarters with collections of books, where he would often spoke with his advisors, Sun and Chen Jue were frequent visitors to the hall.

== During Southern Tang ==
=== During Li Bian's reign ===
In 937, Wu's final emperor Yang Pu yielded the throne to Xu Zhigao, ending Wu. Xu Zhigao took the throne as emperor of a new state of Southern Tang, and shortly after changed his last name back to his birth last name of Li while taking a new personal name of Bian. During Li Bian's reign as emperor, Sun Sheng successively served as Zhongshu Sheren (中書舍人, a mid-level official at the legislative bureau of government (中書省, Zhongshu Sheng)), imperial scholar (翰林學士, Hanlin Xueshi), and Zhongshu Shilang (中書侍郎, deputy head of the legislative bureau). There was a time when the official Feng Yanji, a close associate of Li Bian's oldest son and heir presumptive Li Jing the Prince of Qi, joked with Sun, "What abilities do you have, Lord, that you get to be Zhongshu Shilang?" Sun, who had long despised Feng, responded:

I, Sun Sheng, am only a foolish scholar from east of the Taihang Mountains. My writing is not as good as yours, Lord. My humor is not as good as yours, Lord. My trickery is not as good as yours, Lord. But the Master made you, Lord, a friend to the Prince of Qi in order to ask you to guide him with kindness and righteousness, not to spend time in entertainment and games with him. Even though I am not capable, your capabilities are enough to bring the state into danger.

When Li Bian fell ill and then shortly after died in 943, Sun was concerned that Feng and his associates would become powerful, and therefore considered claiming that Li Bian left a will naming his wife Empress Song regent over the new emperor Li Jing. However, when the imperial scholar Li Yiye (李貽業) objected, pointing out that LI Bian himself had often spoken against the idea of female regents and that it would be unnatural for Li Jing, well into his adulthood, to have a regent in any case — going as far as stating that if the emperor will were published with the directions to name Empress Song regent that he would publicly tear the edict apart — Sun relented and did not forge such a will. Li Jing shortly after took the throne as the new emperor.

=== During Li Jing's reign ===
After Li Jing took the throne, at the urging of his younger brother Li Jingda (李景達), who apparently did not like Sun Sheng, Sun was sent away from the imperial administration to serve as the military governor of Yongtai Circuit (永泰, headquartered in modern Anqing, Anhui). It was said that Sun governed the circuit's army with strict discipline. In 944, when the official Xiao Yan (蕭儼) offended Li Jing by comparing his palace to that of the Chen dynasty's last emperor Chen Shubao, Li Jing had Xiao exiled to Yongtai's capital Shu Prefecture (舒州). Sun subsequently sent guards to put Xiao under strict guard. Xiao met him and rebuked him for doing so, while pointing out that Sun himself had nearly disrupted the proper imperial succession. Sun, humbled, withdrew the guards. At one point, two soldiers at Yongtai, apparently resenting Sun for his discipline, entered headquarters and wanted to assassinate Sun. However, Sun happened to be not at the headquarters at that time, so they assassinated the officer Li Jianchong (李建崇) and then escaped. As a result of this incident, Sun was demoted to be the minister of palace supplies (光祿卿, Guanglu Qing). However, Li Jing, who had respected Sun, did not further punish him, and later made him You Puye (右僕射, one of the heads of the executive bureau (尚書省, Shangshu Sheng)).

In 952, Li Jing named Sun, along with Feng Yanji and Xu Jingyun (徐景運), chancellors with the designation Tong Zhongshu Menxia Pingzhangshi (同中書門下平章事). When hearing of this, Sun, who had long disrespected Feng, made the comment, "Is it that gold goblets and jade bowls are going to contain dog feces?"

At the time that Sun, Feng, and Xu became chancellors, Southern Tang had just destroyed its southwestern neighbor Chu, but was in effective control of only one of the three main circuits of Chu — Wu'an (武安, headquartered at Chu's formal capital Changsha, Hunan); the other two main circuits, Wuping (武平, headquartered in modern Changde, Hunan), and Jingjiang (靜江, headquartered in modern Guilin, Guangxi), remained out of Southern Tang's effective control, with Wuping effectively under the control of the warlord Liu Yan, and Jingjiang's having been seized by Southern Han when Chu fell to Southern Tang. Li Jing initially did not want to carry out further campaigns over Chu territory, and therefore considered effectively letting Southern Han retain Jingjiang and bringing Wuping under only formal and not actual control by issuing a commission to Liu, allowing him to retain Wuping. Sun agreed with this idea, but Feng opposed, believing that this would cause Southern Tang's conquest effectively meaningless. Under Feng's advice, Li Jing maintained the campaigns to take Jingjiang and Wuping, but those campaigns were unsuccessful, and, in winter 952, Liu attacked Changsha and took control of it, effectively chasing Southern Tang out of the former Chu territory. Hearing of the defeat, Feng and Sun submitted petitions blaming themselves and asking to be relieved from their posts. Li Jing initially declined, but upon Sun's insistence, removed them from their chancellorships and leaving them as Puyes.

During the more than two decades that Sun served under Li Bian and Li Jing, he accumulated great wealth. It was said that each time at dinner, Sun did not use dinner tables; rather, he had his servant girls each hold a vessel of food and surround him (and perhaps dinner guests), calling them "fleshy dining tables." The rich people of the Southern Tang realm much imitated this style.

By 956, Southern Tang was under serious attack by its northern neighbor Later Zhou. Faced with this great crisis, Li Jing bestowed the grand title of Sikong (司空, one of the Three Excellencies) on Sun, and sent him with the minister Wang Chongzhi (王崇直) as emissaries to Later Zhou's emperor Guo Rong, offering to formally submit as a vassal and offering gifts, begging Guo to stop his attack. (It was said that before departing on the mission, Sun believed that he would not return alive, and stated to Feng, "While this mission should have belonged to the Zuo Xiang [(左相, an alternative way of referring to Zuo Puye)], if I, Sun Sheng, do not go, I would be neglectful in my duties to the deceased emperor." The instructions that Li Jing gave him were to offer to Guo the terms of 1) Li Jing would no longer refer to himself as an emperor and become a vassal; 2) cede six prefectures to Later Zhou; and 3) offer yearly tributes of gold and silk — the same instructions that Li Jing had given earlier emissaries Li Deming (李德明) and Zhong Mo (鍾謨).

After Sun and Wang arrived at Guo's camp — with Guo then sieging the major Southern Tang border city of Shou Prefecture (壽州, in modern Lu'an), Guo had Sun taken to just outside Shou's walls to show him to Shou's defender Liu Renzhan (劉仁瞻) the military governor of Qinghuai Circuit (清淮, i.e., the circuit formerly named Fengguo), to try to persuade Liu to surrender. When Liu saw Sun, he bowed in his armor. Sun, however, stated to him, "You, sir, had received great grace from the state. You shall not open your gates to welcome the bandits [(i.e., the Later Zhou army)]." When Guo heard what happened, he was angry with Sun, but Sun stated to him, "I, your subject, is a chancellor of Tang. How can I teach a military governor to defect?" Guo thus did not punish him.

However, the terms that Li Deming and Zhong, and later Sun and Wang, offered Guo on their emperor's behalf, was not sufficient enticing to Guo, with his generals repeatedly prevailing over Southern Tang forces, causing him to want to take control of all of Southern Tang territory north of the Yangtze River, so he refused Li JIng's offer. Li Deming, concerned about Later Zhou advances, requested to return to Li Jing's court to persuade Li Jing to yield all of the territory north of the Yangtze. Guo agreed, and, at Sun's request, allowed Li Deming and Wang to return to Southern Tang's capital Jinling. Upon their arrival in Jinling, Li Deming reported to Li Jing the capabilities that Guo had as well as the strength of the Later Zhou army, advocating increasing the Southern Tang offer, to cede all territory north of the Yangtze. However, the chancellor Song Qiqiu opposed any cession of territory. With Chen Jue, then chief of staff, and his deputy Li Zhenggu (李徵古), long disliking Li Deming and Sun, Chen and Li Zhenggu enticed Wang into giving a different report than Li Deming. Chen and Li Zhenggu then accused Li Deming of selling the state out. Li Jing, in anger, executed Li Deming.

Subsequently, Southern Tang forces, under the overall command of the general Zhu Yuan (朱元), made many gains on their counterattack, taking back several prefectures that Later Zhou forces had taken. Guo decided to return to his capital Kaifeng to reorganize his attack, while leaving the matters of the front to his generals, one of which was his cousin Li Chongjin (the son of the sister of his adoptive father, Later Zhou's founding emperor Guo Wei). Guo took Sun and Zhong with him back to Kaifeng, and initially treated them with respect. However, news came that Li Jing had tried to entice Li Chongjin into rebelling against Later Zhou by sending him letters that were much accusatory against Guo — letters that Li Chongjin then submitted to Guo. (Sun had previously, in his attempts to try to persuade Guo to accept peace, claimed that Li Jing was very respectful and fearful of Guo.) Seeing the letters, Guo angrily confronted Sun and accused him of lying. Sun did not beg for his life, instead responding with dignity and asking for death. Guo then asked Sun to give him secrets of the Southern Tang state, and Sun refused. When Guo subsequently had his general Cao Han (曹翰) again ask Sun to do so, Sun also refused Cao's overtures. Cao then stated to Sun, "The Emperor issued an edict, granting death to you, Lord Chancellor." Hearing of this, Sun's expression did not change. He asked for his shoes and dressed in formality, bowing to the south (toward Southern Tang), stating, "I, your subject, now will repay the state with my death." He was then killed, as were over 100 of his attendants. Guo then exiled Zhong. However, he then regretted killing the faithful Sun and recalled Zhong. Meanwhile, hearing of Sun's death, Li Jing wept, and gave him the posthumous honors of Taifu (太傅) and Duke of Lu, and he gave much wealth to Sun's family.

== Notes and references ==
- Spring and Autumn Annals of the Ten Kingdoms, vol. 27.
- Zizhi Tongjian, vols. 276, 277, 283, 290, 291, 293.
