= Li Bian =

Emperor of Southern Tang from 937 to 943

Emperor Liezu of Southern Tang 南唐烈祖
- Emperor of (Southern) Tang (more...)

1st emperor of Southern Tang
- Reign: November 10, 937 – March 30, 943
- Successor: Li Jing (Emperor Yuanzong), son
- Born: January 7, 889; Pengcheng, Xú Prefecture, Tang dynasty
- Died: March 30, 943 (Aged 54); Jinling Municipality, Southern Tang dynasty
- Burial: Qin Mausoleum (欽陵; in modern Jiangning District, Nanjing, Jiangsu)
- Wives: Lady Wang (王); Empress Song
- Concubines: Chong Shiguang (种時光); Lady Ji (吉); Lady Zhou (周); Lady Meng (孟)
- Issue: Li Jing, son; Xu Jingqian, son; Li Jingsui, son; Li Jingda, son; Li Jingti (李景逷), son; at least 7 daughters
Names
- Originally Li Pengnu (李彭奴), later changed to Xu Zhigao (徐知誥), then to Xu Gao (徐誥), Li Ang (李昂), Li Huang (李晃), Li Dan (李旦), and finally to Li Bian (李昪)
Era name and dates
- Shēngyúan (昇元): November 10, 937 – April 8, 943
Posthumous name
- Emperor Guangwen Suwu Xiaogao (光文肅武孝高皇帝) (full)
Temple name
- Lièzǔ (烈祖)
- House: Li (by birth); Xu (adoptive)
- Dynasty: Southern Tang
- Father: Li Rong (李榮), biological father; Xu Wen, adoptive father
- Mother: Lady Liu (劉), biological mother; Lady Li (李), adoptive mother

Li Bian
- Chinese: 李昪
Transcriptions
Standard Mandarin
- Hanyu Pinyin: Lǐ Biàn

Xu Gao
- Traditional Chinese: 徐誥
- Simplified Chinese: 徐诰
Transcriptions
Standard Mandarin
- Hanyu Pinyin: Xú Gào

Xu Zhigao
- Traditional Chinese: 徐知誥
- Simplified Chinese: 徐知诰
Transcriptions
Standard Mandarin
- Hanyu Pinyin: Xú Zhīgào

Li Pengnu
- Chinese: 李彭奴
Transcriptions
Standard Mandarin
- Hanyu Pinyin: Lǐ Péngnú

Li Zhenglun / Xu Zhenglun
- Traditional Chinese: 李正倫 / 徐正倫
- Simplified Chinese: 李正伦 / 徐正伦
Transcriptions
Standard Mandarin
- Hanyu Pinyin: Lǐ Zhènglún / Xú Zhènglún

Li Bian (7 January 889 – 30 March 943), courtesy name Zhenglun, known as Xu Gao between 937 and 939 and Xu Zhigao before 937, and possibly Li Pengnu during his childhood, also known by his temple name as the Emperor Liezu of Southern Tang, was the founder and first emperor of the Chinese Southern Tang dynasty. In traditional histories, he is also often referred to as the First Lord of Southern Tang (南唐先主). He was an adopted son and successor of the Yang Wu regent Xu Wen who usurped power from the Yang Wu emperor Yang Pu.

== Early life ==
Li Bian was born in 889 at Pengcheng (彭城, in modern Xuzhou, Jiangsu), during the reign of Emperor Zhaozong of Tang, and might have been known as Li Pengnu in his childhood. His father was named Li Rong (李榮), who was said to be careful and kind. Li Rong favored spending time with Buddhist monks and often visited their residences, such that he became known as Philosopher Li (李道者). His mother was a Lady Liu, who was probably Li Rong's wife.

In 893, Li Rong died. At that time, the Pengcheng region was engulfed in warfare. Li Rong's older brother Li Qiu (李球) took Li Bian and Lady Liu and fled to Hao Prefecture (濠州, in modern Chuzhou, Anhui). Shortly after, Lady Liu died. Li Qiu, apparently unable to care for Li Bian, left Li Bian in the care of the monks at Kaiyuan Temple (開元寺) at Hao.

In 895, the major warlord Yang Xingmi the military governor of Huainan Circuit (淮南, headquartered in modern Yangzhou, Jiangsu) attacked Hao and captured it. Yang's soldiers took Li Bian captive. Yang, finding Li Bian's appearance to be unusual, wanted to take him in as an adoptive son, but Yang's oldest son Yang Wo disliked Li Bian. Yang therefore gave Li Bian to his officer Xu Wen, and Xu took Li Bian as an adoptive son and renamed him Xu Zhigao. As Xu Wen's wife Lady Li had the same surname and felt attached to Xu Zhigao, she cared for him well. It was said that Xu Zhigao served his father with greater filial piety than Xu Wen's other (biological) sons. One time, when he offended Xu Wen, Xu Wen caned him and chased him out of the house. However, when Xu Wen came home at night, Xu Zhigao was waiting at the door for him. Xu Wen asked, "Why are you still here?" Xu Zhigao wept and responded, "Where can a son go but to his parents? When father is angry, I go to mother. This is what human nature is." Xu Wen became even more loving of him, and often put him in charge of family matters. (Xu Wen had six biological sons known to history – Xu Zhixùn, Xu Zhixún, Xu Zhihui (徐知誨), Xu Zhijian (徐知諫), Xu Zhizheng (徐知證), and Xu Zhi'e (徐知諤); and it appeared that at least five, if not all six, were younger than Xu Zhigao.) When Xu Zhigao grew older, he became known for calligraphy and archery; he was also intelligent and handsome. Yang Xingmi often told Xu Wen, "Xu Zhigao is capable. None of the older officers' sons can be compared to him."

== During Xu Wen's regency of Hongnong/Wu ==
In 908 – by which time Tang had fallen and the Huainan territory was now an independent state ruled by Yang Wo under the title of Prince of Hongnong after Yang Xingmi's death – Xu Wen and another officer, Zhang Hao, assassinated Yang Wo. Shortly after, Xu killed Zhang, and made Yang Wo's younger brother Yang Longyan the Prince of Hongnong (later with the greater title of Prince of Wu). Xu effectively served as the regent and controlled Wu's government. Xu Zhigao was apparently given the command of the Yuancong Corps (元從). In 909, Xu Wen, believing that Jinling was a good defensible location and where the Hongnong fleet could be best stationed, took for himself the title of prefect of Sheng Prefecture (昇州, i.e., Jinling) but made Xu Zhigao the discipline officer of Sheng as well as the deputy commander of the fleet, stationing at Sheng to be in charge of it.

In 912, after a campaign in which Xu Wen destroyed one of the most ardent resisters to his regency, Li Yu (李遇) the governor of Xuan Prefecture (宣州, in modern Xuancheng, Anhui), Xu Zhigao, for his participation in the campaign as the deputy commander to the general in charge, Chai Zaiyong (柴再用), was promoted to be the prefect of Sheng. It was said that he governed Sheng well, selecting honest administrators, and gathered learned people around him. It was at this time that he became impressed with a strategist, Song Qiqiu, and made Song his assistant. Song, Wang Lingmou, and Wang Hong (王翃) became his chief advisors, while officers Ma Renyu (馬仁裕), Zhou Zong, and Cao Cong (曹淙) became close associates.

In 915, Xu Wen decided to leave the Wu capital Guangling and make Run Prefecture (潤州, in modern Zhenjiang, Jiangsu) his headquarters. He left Xu Zhigao's brother Xu Zhixùn in charge at Guangling as the junior regent. However, Xu Zhixùn was arrogant and ran the government impulsively, which Xu Wen was unaware. Meanwhile, in 917, when Xu Wen went to Sheng to examine the prefecture, he was impressed by its prosperity. Under the advice of the officer Chen Yanqian (陳彥謙), he decided to move his headquarters (in his role as the military governor of Zhenhai Circuit (鎮海)) to Sheng, while moving Xu Zhigao from Sheng to serve as the military prefect of Run. Xu Zhigao did not want the Run post and requested the Xuan post, but Xu Wen refused to grant it. Song, however, pointed out to him secretly that Xu Zhixùn would soon be bringing a disaster on himself, and Run, being just across the Yangtze River from Guangling, would allow Xu Zhigao to react quickly. Xu Zhigao agreed, and took up the post thereafter.

Over the years, Xu Zhigao and Xu Zhixùn developed an adversarial relationship, as Xu Zhixùn, as well as Xu Zhixún, did not truly consider Xu Zhigao a brother. However, Xu Zhijian had a good relationship with Xu Zhigao and helped to protect him.

In 918, after Xu Zhixùn insulted the general Zhu Jin and tried to expel Zhu from the Wu central government, Zhu assassinated him and then, when corned by Xu Wen's close associate Zhai Qian (翟虔), committed suicide. Xu Zhigao, upon hearing of the disturbance at Guangling, took his troops, crossed the Yangtze, and pacified the city. After Xu Wen subsequently arrived, he suspected many other generals and officials of being in a conspiracy with Zhu and considered major reprisals. Xu Zhigao and Yan Keqiu, however, reported to him about Xu Zhixùn's acts that brought alienation – including his arrogance and lack of respect for even Yang Longyan, as his sovereign. Xu Wen, listening to them, did not carry out large scale reprisals. As all of his other sons were young, he made Xu Zhigao the junior regent with the official titles of deputy commander of the Huainan army, deputy commander of the infantry and cavalry, general overseer of the headquarters, and military prefect of Jiang Prefecture (江州, in modern Jiujiang, Jiangxi), with Xu Zhijian taking over his post as military prefect of Run. It was said that Xu Zhigao governed opposite to how Xu Zhixùn did – he treated Yang Longyan with respect, was frugal, and was respectful to the other officials. He also lowered the tax burden on the people. He continued to employ Song as a chief strategist. Later in the year, when Yan was repeatedly trying to persuade Xu Wen to replace Xu Zhigao with Xu Zhixún, Xu Zhigao tried to remove Yan from the scene by making him the prefect of Chu Prefecture (楚州, in modern Huai'an, Jiangsu). When Yan received the order, however, he went to see Xu Wen. At the meeting, he pointed out that at that time, Wu's nominal ally and fellow rival to Later Liang, Jin, was winning victory after victory over Later Liang, and that Jin's prince Li Cunxu appeared to be posturing to claim the imperial title himself and claim lawful succession from the Tang emperors. Yan argued that, with that being the case, Wu's political structure was untenable since it, like Jin, had been claiming its desire to reestablish Tang. Yan instead suggested that Xu Wen advise Yang Longyan to claim imperial title as well and restructure the Wu political structure to cut off connections to Tang. Xu Wen agreed, and he kept Yan at Guangling to prepare for ceremonies for such a break with Tang. Xu Zhigao, seeing that he could not eliminate Yan, instead decided to make peace with Yan by giving a daughter in marriage to Yan's son Yan Xu.

In 919, Xu Wen advised Yang Longyan to claim imperial title. Yang Longyan declined, but claimed the greater title of King of Wu, thus ending connections to Tang. Xu Zhigao remained junior regent, now with the greater titles of Zuo Pushe (左僕射, one of the heads of the executive bureau of government (尚書省, Shangshu Sheng)), de facto chancellor as Can Zhengshi (參政事), acting overseers of all military matters (知內外諸軍事, Zhi Neiwai Zhu Junshi), and military prefect of Jiang. Later in the year, when Wu forces, under Xu Wen, repelled a major attack by Wu's southeastern neighbor Wuyue, Xu Zhigao suggested a surprise attack on Wuyue's Su Prefecture (蘇州, in modern Suzhou, Jiangsu), but Xu Wen, citing the desire for peace between the two states, declined.

In 921, after Yang Longyan, at Xu Wen's advice, offered sacrifices to heaven and earth to show him more as a full sovereign, Xu Zhigao was granted the greater chancellor title of Tong Zhongshu Menxia Pingzhangshi (同中書門下平章事), and was also promoted to be the governor of Jiang. Also, Jiang Prefecture was converted to a new Fenghua Circuit (奉化), and Xu Zhigao was made its military governor, even as he remained at Guangling as junior regent.

In 923, after there were accusations that Zhong Taizhang (鍾泰章) the military prefect of Shou Prefecture (壽州, in modern Lu'an, Anhui) was embezzling horses, Xu Zhigao replaced him with Wang Ren (王稔) and demoted him to the post of prefect of Rao Prefecture (饒州, in modern Shangrao, Jiangxi). He wanted to further have Zhong interrogated, but Xu Wen, pointing out that Zhong was a close ally during the time when he killed Zhang Hao and stating that he would have died at Zhang's hands without Zhong, refused. He further had Xu Zhigao's son Xu Jingtong marry Zhong Taizhang's daughter, to make peace between Xu Zhigao and Zhong.

In 926, Xu Zhigao's chancellor title was made the greater title of Shizhong (侍中). In 927, seeing that there was a plague of officers who were not paying proper attention to protocol, he intentionally intruded into the residence of Yang Longyan's younger brother and successor as King of Wu, Yang Pu. He immediately withdrew and apologized, and had himself indicted. When Yang Pu issued an edict declining to punish him, he nevertheless imposed a penalty of one month of salary on himself, to show that even he himself was subject to punishment and to restore discipline.

Meanwhile, over the years, Xu Zhixún, citing the fact that Xu Zhigao was not actually a biological son of Xu Wen's, repeatedly pleaded to Xu Wen to take over the junior regency. Yan Keqiu and Xu Jie also often spoke in favor of this change. Xu Wen, as Xu Zhigao was filially pious and careful, declined, and Xu Zhigao was also supported by Xu Wen's principal concubine Lady Chen, who stated to Xu Wen, "Xu Zhigao is someone whom you raised in our home since you were not yet prominent. How is it that you would abandon him now that you are honored?" However, as Yan and others repeatedly spoke of this, Xu Wen eventually changed his mind. In late 927, he planned to go to Guangling to request that Yang Pu take imperial title and take Xu Zhixùn with him, and then, after the ceremony, leave Xu Zhixùn there to be junior regent. However, he then fell ill, so he sent Xu Zhixùn to Guangling with his petition for Yang Pu to take imperial title and to take over for Xu Zhigao. Hearing this, Xu Zhigao drafted a petition to Yang Pu, where he would resign his offices and requested to be made the military governor of Zhennan Circuit (鎮南, headquartered in modern Nanchang, Jiangxi). However, while Xu Zhixùn was still on the way, Xu Wen died, and Xu Zhixùn immediately returned to Jinling, so Xu Zhigao never actually resigned and remained in his office.

== During his own regency of Wu ==
=== Initial contention with Xu Zhixún ===
Shortly after Xu Wen's death, Yang Pu, per Xu Wen's final recommendations, took imperial title. Meanwhile, Xu Wen's titles were split between Xu Zhigao and Xu Zhixun, with Xu Zhigao assuming Xu Wen's title as overseer of all military matters (都督中外總軍事, Dudu Zhongwai Zongjunshi), while Xu Zhixun took on the title of deputy supreme commander of all circuits (諸道副都統, Zhudao Fu Dutong, with Xu Wen having been supreme commander before, and that post now left open) and military governor of Ningguo (寧國, headquartered at Xuan Prefecture) and Zhenhai Circuits, which Xu Wen had been; he also took the greater honorary chancellor title of Shizhong (侍中).

Even though Xu Zhigao remained in control of Wu's imperial government, Xu Zhixun, at Jinling (i.e., Sheng Prefecture), controlled the largest army of the state, and he, wielding that authority, contended for decision-making with Xu Zhigao, who tried to curb Xu Zhixun's military power. For example, in 929, when Xu Zhixun's father-in-law, the general Li Jian (李簡) the military governor of Wuchang Circuit (武昌, headquartered in modern Wuhan, Hubei) died, Xu Zhixun took 2,000 of Li Jian's soldiers and kept them under his command, while recommending Li Jian's son Li Yanzhong (李彥忠) to succeed Li Jian. Xu Zhigao, however, ignoring Xu Zhixun's recommendations, made the general Chai Zaiyong (柴再用) the military governor of Wuchang, drawing Xu Zhixun's ire.

Given Xu Zhixun's military strength, Xu Zhigao feared him, but Xu Zhixun's arrogance alienated his younger brothers, particularly both Xu Zhihui and Xu Zhijian; Xu Zhihui secretly reported Xu Zhixun's actions to Xu Zhigao, while Xu Zhijian, at Guangling, participated in Xu Zhigao's machinations against Xu Zhixun. Xu Jie, who had previously supported Xu Zhixun, also realized that Xu Zhixun lacked the proper abilities to lead, and instead turned his allegiance to Xu Zhigao. Meanwhile, Xu Zhixun was not curbing his actions properly; for example, when Wuyue's king Qian Liu sent Xu Zhixun gifts of vessels and saddles adorn with dragons and phoenixes – which only the sovereign could use – Xu Zhixun used them, making no attempts to avoid making them into a display. His close associate Zhou Tingwang (周廷望) persuaded him to let Zhou take large amounts of wealth to Guangling to try to use them to bribe other high level officials to turn from Xu Zhigao and toward him, but when Zhou arrived at Guangling, Zhou secretly pledged allegiance to Xu Zhigao through Xu Zhigao's associate Zhou Zong, and informed Xu Zhixun's actions to Xu Zhigao – but then, when he returned to Jinling, also informed Xu Zhigao's actions to Xu Zhixun, trying to play both sides.

Later in 929, Xu Zhixun tried to summon Xu Zhigao to Jinling to attend a ceremony where they would remove mourning clothes that they had put on for Xu Wen's death; Xu Zhigao refused, claiming that Yang Pu would not let him leave the capital. Meanwhile, Zhou Zong told Zhou Tingwang to inform Xu Zhixun that he had been accused of seven major crimes and should go to the capital to defend himself. Xu Zhixun believed Zhou Tingwang, and therefore went to Guangling. Once he arrived there, Xu Zhigao detained him and did not allow him to return to Jinling, sending the officer Ke Hou (柯厚) to lead the Jinling forces back to Guangling, thus consolidating the command under Xu Zhigao himself. Xu Zhixun was kept at Guangling to take the office of army commander (統軍, Tongjun), still carrying the title of military governor of Zhenhai Circuit. (The command of Ningguo Circuit went to Xu Zhigao.) It was said that it was only after this point that Xu Zhigao had true, unchallenged authority over Wu's governance. The brothers then had a verbal confrontation in which Xu Zhixun stated, "When the deceased Prince [(i.e., Xu Wen, who carried the title of Prince of Donghai)] left this world, you, older brother, were his son. How could it be that you did not attend to his funereal matters?" Xu Zhigao responded, "You had a sword drawn, intended for me. How could I dare to go? You are a subject, so how could you have ridden on imperial wagons and worn imperial clothes?" When Xu Zhixun then questioned him about his actions, Xu Zhigao realized that Zhou Tingwang was playing both sides, so had Zhou Tingwang executed.

=== As unchallenged regent ===
In 930, Xu Zhigao prepared to himself have his headquarters set up at Jinling, and he had Xu Jingtong commissioned the minister of defense (兵部尚書, Bingbu Shangshu) and Can Zhengshi, preparing to have Xu Jingtong take over his responsibilities at Guangling. He also wanted to have Song Qiqiu made a chancellor, but Song, knowing that he did not yet have the proper reputation to be a chancellor, declined and retired for some time, before returning to the government. In 931, Xu Zhigao himself was made the military governor of Zhenhai and Ningguo, with headquarters at Jinling, while Xu Jingtong was made Situ (司徒, one of the Three Excellencies), Zhongshu Menxia Pingzhangshi, and acting overseer of all military matters. Wang Lingmou and Song were made chancellors to assist Li Jingtong. Once he settled in at Jinling, Xu Zhigao build a Lixian Pavilion (禮賢院), where he collected books and discussed current events with learned guests, including Sun Sheng and Chen Jue.

In 933, Song Qiqiu advised Xu Zhigao to move the Wu capital from Guangling to Jinling, and Xu thus began to build a palace complex at Jinling. He himself moved from his headquarters into a private residence, preparing to move the emperor there. However, after Zhou Zong pointed out that moving the capital was an expensive endeavor and that if he moved the capital to Jinling, he might needed to take up headquarters in Jiangdu (i.e., Guangling, now known as Jiangdu Municipality) instead. As a result, the project was cancelled, and he shortly after moved back into headquarters.

Also in 933, the Wu general Jiang Yanhui (蔣延徽), trying to take advantage of a rebellion by Wu Guang (吳光) against Wu's southeastern neighbor Min, put Min's key city of Jian Prefecture (建州, in modern Nanping, Fujian) under siege and nearly captured it. However, upon receiving reports of Jiang's campaign, Xu was apprehensive of the fact that Jiang was a son-in-law of Yang Xingmi's and had a particularly friendly relationship with Yang Pu's brother Yang Meng the Prince of Linchuan – who was resentful of the Xu family's hold on power – and that he thus might, if he captured Jian, use it as a base to support Yang Meng against Xu. Xu thus sent an order for Jiang to withdraw, which Jiang did, with substantial losses when his retreating army was attacked by Min forces.

During the years, Xu had considered having Yang Pu pass the throne to him and for himself to be emperor instead, but as Yang Pu was virtuous, he was concerned that the people might be displeased at a transition, and therefore, as Song advised, was to wait until Yang Pu's passing and a new emperor's enthroning. However, one day, as he was plucking his white facial hair in front of a mirror, he commented, "The empire is safe, but I am getting old." Zhou Zong, hearing this, volunteered to go to Jiangdu to start hinting to Yang of the need for transition, as well as to inform this to Song. Xu agreed. However, when Song heard of this, he became intensely jealous of Zhou, and he wrote a letter to Xu, arguing that this was not the right time, and also asking that Zhou be put to death as an apology to Yang. As a result, Xu demoted Zhou to be the deputy military prefect of Chi Prefecture (池州, in modern Chizhou). However, when Li Jianxun and Xu Jie subsequently also encouraged Xu Zhigao to take the throne, Xu Zhigao recalled Zhou and, from that point on, began to distance himself from Song. As Xu Zhigao was apprehensive of Yang Meng still, he had others make accusations against Yang Meng for secretly making weapons and hiding fugitives. Yang Meng was demoted to the title of Duke of Liang, and put under house arrest at He Prefecture (和州, in modern Hefei, Anhui). Late in 934, Xu recalled Song to his headquarters and made Song his assistant, as well as Sikong (司空, one of the Three Excellencies) but did not give him real authority from then on. He also recalled Xu Jingtong back from Jiangdu to serve as his deputy; a younger son, Xu Jingqian, was made the junior regent in Xu Jingtong's stead. (Xu Jingqian would fall ill in 936 and be replaced by his younger brother Xu Jingsui, and eventually die before Xu Zhigao became emperor.)

In late 935, Yang Pu created Xu Zhigao the Prince of Qi, and gave him the additional titles of Taishi (太師) and Generalissimo (大元帥, Da Yuanshuai). (Yang Pu's edict also conferred additional honorific titles, but Xu declined those.) The Principality of Qi was given 10 prefectures in which Xu had exclusive authority. In spring 936, he began to establish a Generalissimo headquarters with six ministries, as well as a directorate of salt and iron monopolies, modeling after an imperial government. He also made Li Jingtong deputy generalissimo, and Song and Xu Jie his assistants. After Yang Pu issued an edict in late 936 authorizing him to establish a Qi government, he did so in early 937, including beginning to refer to his headquarters as a palace, and making Song and Xu Jie his chancellors and Zhou Zong and Zhou Tingyu (周廷玉) his chiefs of staff (內樞使, Neishushi, equivalent to other states' Shumishi). He also changed his name to Xu Gao. Under Song's advice, he sent emissaries to Khitan Empire's Emperor Taizong (Yelü Deguang) to establish friendly relations, to counter Later Jin, which then controlled central China.

As it was becoming apparent that Xu Gao was getting ready to take the throne from Yang Pu, Yang Meng decided to try to make a final attempt to prevent the transition. In fall 937, he assassinated Wang Hong (王宏), the commander of the soldiers that Xu Gao put in charge of guarding him. He headed for Desheng Circuit (德勝, headquartered in modern Hefei), hoping that its military governor Zhou Ben, who was a senior general under Yang Xingmi, would support him. However, Zhou Ben's son Zhou Hongzuo (周弘祚) refused to let Zhou Ben receive Yang Meng, and instead had Yang Meng arrested. Xu Gao, claiming that it was Yang Pu's order, had Yang Meng put to death.

By this point, the Wu generals and officials were all signing petitions for Xu Gao to take the throne – including the old and ill Wang Lingmou, who died shortly after doing so. Song, however, continued to refuse to sign. In winter 937, Xu Gao accepted the throne, ending Wu, and starting his new state. (The Zizhi Tongjian referred to his state as Tang (historically known as Southern Tang at this juncture, although other sources, including the Old History of the Five Dynasties, New History of the Five Dynasties, and the Spring and Autumn Annals of the Ten Kingdoms, referred to his state as Qi at this point, and only changed to Tang after Xu Gao subsequently changed back to his birth name of Li (see below).)

== As emperor of Southern Tang ==
=== Before changing name back to Li ===
Xu Gao posthumously honored his adoptive father Xu Wen as an emperor, and his adoptive mother Lady Li as an empress, although the other Xu ancestors were only posthumously honored as princes or dukes, while their wives were honored as ladies. Instead of the usual dynastic transitions, where the new emperor would create the old emperor a noble title, Xu Gao submitted a petition (i.e., still acting as if he were a subject) to Yang Pu, stating:

Your old subject Xu Gao, who has received your gracious yielding of the throne [(禪讓, Shanrang)], respectfully bows to you, Emperor, and presents you with the honorable title of Emperor Gaoshang Sixuan Honggu Rang. Your palace, imperial train, and clothing will all remain the same. Your ancestral temples, insignia, and clothing colors will also remain the same as they were in the Wu days.

Yang Pu, finding it untenable for the Southern Tang emperor to still be claiming to be his subject, wrote a letter back declining this humility. The Southern Tang emperor wrote another submission (i.e., still in the form of a subject) thanking him, but continued to use the formality of a subject. Yang Pu's crown prince Yang Lian, who was Xu Gao's son-in-law, was created a duke.

Meanwhile, Xu created his wife Song Fujin empress, and Xu Jingtong the Prince of Wu, as well as a number of other honorific titles – including Shangshu Ling (尚書令), which in Tang times had only been held by Emperor Taizong of Tang – making him apparently the heir. (Xu Jingtong was soon renamed Xu Jing.) His uneasy relationship with his longtime friend Song Qiqiu continued, as although he made Song a chancellor, he did not give Song actual authorities, causing Song to be apprehensive. Believing that Xu Gao might be displeased that he had opposed the dynastic transition, he proposed moving Yang Pu to a more distant location and that a divorce be ordered between Yang Lian and Xu Gao's daughter (now titled Princess Yongxing). Xu Gao rejected both proposals.

However, in spring 938, with Yang Pu insisting moving out of his old palace and one of the chancellors, Li Decheng, also advocating the same, Xu Gao converted the inner city of Run Prefecture into Danyang Palace and had Li Decheng move Yang Pu there; the entire Yang imperial clan was then moved into Danyang Palace as well and placed under heavy guard. Meanwhile, the officials were submitting many petitions asking for names of places that had characters of "Wu" or "Yang" be changed. At Xu Jie's suggestion that such matters should not become pressing matters, Xu Gao did not act on them.

Around new year 939, Yang Pu died. Xu Gao declared a lengthy mourning period for him, and honored him posthumously as Emperor Rui. (Due to the quickness of his death after yielding the throne, it was commonly believed that he was killed on the new emperor's orders, although definitive proof was lacking.)

=== After changing name back to Li ===
Meanwhile, a movement began among Xu Gao's officials to petition to have him change his surname back to Li, but he initially declined, citing that he did not want to forget Xu Wen's grace to him. In spring 939, apparently feeling justified because his younger brothers Xu Zhizheng and Xu Zhi'e had become the lead petitioners, he approved the petition. When the officials subsequently offered an honorific imperial title to him, he rejected it, stating, "An honorific title is false beauty, and it is not in accordance with ancient traditions." The Song dynasty historian Sima Guang commented that subsequently, his successors (son Li Jing and grandson Li Yu) also declined such honorifics, and in this area of governance, as well as preventing relatives from wielding improper power and interference by eunuchs into governance, none of the other states of the time could be compared to Southern Tang. Xu Gao took the name of Li Bian, and effectively claimed to be the legitimate successor to the Tang throne and that he was a descendant of Li Ke the son of Emperor Gaozong of Tang. He honored his biological father Li Rong, as well as three other ancestors, as emperors, and their wives as empresses. Xu Wen continued to be honored posthumously as emperor, and was only subordinate to Emperors Gaozu and Taizong in the imperial temples, with all three designated as ancestors whose temples would not be destroyed. Later in the year, he wanted to create Li Jing, now with the title of Prince of Qi, crown prince, but Li Jing declined, and he bestowed additional titles on Li Jing.

In 940, Li Jinquan, Later Jin's military governor of Anyuan Circuit (安遠, headquartered in modern Xiaogan, Hubei), rebelled against Later Jin, and sought aid from Southern Tang. Li Bian sent the generals Li Chengyu (李承裕) and Duan Chugong (段處恭) to aid Li Jinquan, but with instructions not to pillage and to, with haste, escort Li Jinquan back to Southern Tang territory safely. However, in violation of Li Bian's instructions, Li Chengyu seized Li Jinquan's wealth and tried to defend the city, and subsequently engaged and was defeated by the Later Jin general Ma Quanjie (馬全節). Duan was killed in battle, while Li Chengyu was executed by Ma. Some 4,000 Southern Tang soldiers were lost. This caused Li Bian to be saddened for days and blaming himself for not giving even harsher warnings to Li Chengyu. When Later Jin's emperor Shi Jingtang subsequently tried to return the 570 Southern Tang captives to Southern Tang, Li Bian refused to accept them, citing, in a letter to Shi, that they violated his orders. They remained at Later Jin subsequently.

Around the same time, Min's emperor Wang Xi and his brother Wang Yanzheng, who controlled Jian Prefecture, were embroiled in a civil war. Li Bian sent the official Shang Quangong (尚全恭) to Min on a diplomatic mission to try to help end the Min civil war. Under Shang's mediation, the Wang brothers swore an oath of peace, but in reality continued to hate each other.

In 942, at Song's request, Song was allowed to exercise his authority as chancellor, and further was given the authority to oversee the executive bureau, while Li Jingsui oversaw the legislative (中書省, Zhongshu Sheng) and examination (門下省, Menxia Sheng) bureaus, with Li Jing further reviewing all three bureaus. Soon, however, there was an incident when Song's close associate Xia Changtu (夏昌圖) embezzled governmental funds, but Song spared him from death. Li Bian, in anger, ordered Xia's death, and Song, in fear, claimed to be ill, and was relieved of his executive bureau responsibilities. On a subsequent occasion when Song, at his invitation, came to dinner, they got into an argument, but Li Bian subsequently wrote a letter to Song, stating, "Our impatient nature is something you knew well, Zisong [(Song's courtesy name). How can it be that we were dear to each other in youth and hateful to each other in old age?" He subsequently made Song the military governor of Zhennan Circuit (鎮南, headquartered in modern Nanchang, Jiangxi).

As Li Bian himself, while serving as regent of Wu, had often revised laws to try to improve Tang laws, he ordered the judges and the executive bureau to reorganize the laws into a 30-volume work entitled, the Laws of Shengyuan (Shengyuan being his era name). In fall 942, he ordered that those laws be officially promulgated.

Over the years, Li Bian had been tempted to make Li Jingda, whom he considered decisive and capable, his heir, and Song had also often praised Li Jingda's abilities. However, as Li Jing was older, he eventually decided against making Li Jingda his heir. Meanwhile, his youngest son Li Jingti (李景逷) was born of his favorite concubine Consort Zhong, and once, when Li Bian was angry with Li Jing for being occupied with musical instruments, Consort Zhong tried to persuade him to divert succession from Li Jing and making Li Jingti his heir. Finding Consort Zhong's suggestion highly inappropriate, he expelled Consort Zhong out of the palace and had her remarried.

Also over the years, Li Bian had been taking alchemists' medicines, believing that they would allow him to have long life, but the medicines were in fact making his temper flare frequently and health deteriorate. By spring 943, he was quite ill, but pretended to be not ill and continued to be presiding over imperial gatherings. On March 30, 943, he was so ill that the imperial physician had to summon Li Jing to his presence to attend to him. He stated to Li Jing, "I took these medications made of gold and rocks to try to lengthen my lifespan, but instead they harmed me. You should be cautious of this." He died that night. Li Jing initially did not announce his death and only had an edict issued in his name, making Li Jing regent, but soon thereafter announced his death and took the throne.

== Legacy ==
While the kingdom Xianzhu founded did not succeed in reuniting the Chinese realm, it played an important part in the consolidation of politics with the absorption of Min and Chu. It also became one of the leading centers of learning, along with Chengdu of the Later Shu and Hangzhou of Wuyue.

== Personal information ==
Parents:

- Father: Li Rong (李榮) (d. 893), posthumously honored Emperor Xiaode with the temple name of Qingzong (honored 938)
- Mother: Lady Liu, posthumously honored Empress Degong (honored 938)
- Adoptive Father: Xu Wen, Prince Zhongwu of Qi during Wu, further posthumously honored Emperor Wu (honored 937), initially with the temple name of Taizu (honored 937) then Yizu (honored 938)
- Adoptive Mother: Lady Li, posthumously honored Empress Mingde (honored 937)

Wives

- Consort Shun, of the Wang clan (順妃 王氏)
- Empress Yuanjing, of the Song clan (元敬皇后 宋氏, d. 945), personal name Fujin (福金)
  - Li Jing, Crown Prince (太子 李景; 916 – August 12, 961), 1st son
  - Xu Jingqian, Prince Gaoping (高平郡王 徐景遷, 919–937), 2nd son
  - Li Jingsui, Crown Prince Wencheng (文成太弟 李景遂, 920 – 17 September 958), 3rd son
  - Li Jingda, Crown Prince Zhaoxiao (昭孝太弟 李景達, 924–957), 4th son
- Consort Dowager Xu, of the Zhou clan (許太妃 周氏)
- Lady of Bright Countenance, of the Ji clan (昭容吉氏)
- Lady Chong, of the Chong clan (种氏, 921–971), personal name Shiguang (時光)
  - Li Jingti, Prince Zhaoshun of Jiang (江昭順王 李景逷, 938–968), 5th son
- Lady Meng, of the Meng clan (孟氏)
- Children:
  - Princess Yongxing (永興公主), 4th daughter
    - Married Yang Lian, Crown Prince of Wu (太子 楊璉), son of Yang Pu, Emperor Rui (楊溥)
  - Princess Fengcheng (豐城公主)
  - Princess Shengtang (盛唐公主), 7th son
    - Married a son of Yan Keqiu (严可求)
  - Princess Taihe (太和公主), wife of Yan Xu (嚴續)
  - Princess Jianchang (建昌公主)
  - Princess Yushan (玉山公主)
  - Princess Xingguo (興國公主)
    - Married Ma Renyu (馬仁裕)

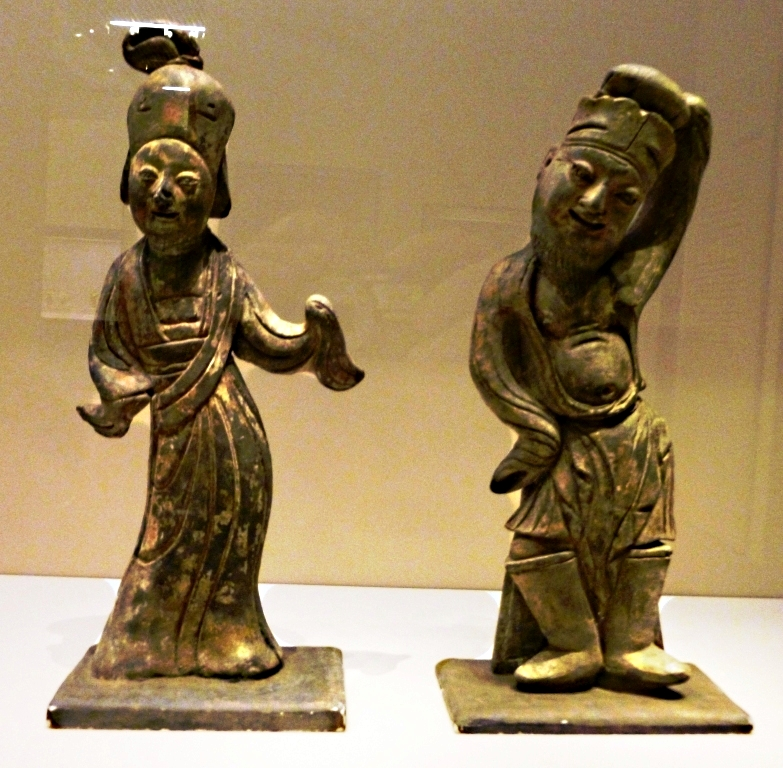
Pottery Dancers. 943 CE. From tomb of Li Bian, founder of Southern Tang dynasty

Chinese nobility
Preceded by None (dynasty founded)	Emperor of Southern Tang; 937–943	Succeeded by Li Jing (Emperor Yuanzong)
Preceded by Yang Pu of Wu	Emperor of China (Jiangsu/Anhui/Jiangxi/Eastern Hubei); 937–943	Succeeded by Li Jing (Emperor Yuanzong)
