= Xu Jingqian =

- Prince of Gaoping 高平郡王; Prince of Chu 楚王
- Born: 919
- Died: 937 (aged 17–18)
- Spouse: Princess Shangyao 上饒公主 (daughter of Yang Pu)
Posthumous name
- Ding 定
- Father: Li Bian
- Mother: Song Fujin

Xu Jingqian (徐景遷) (919-937), also known in some historical records as Li Jingqian (李景遷) (because his family would, after his death, change the surname to Li), posthumously honored as Prince Ding of Chu (楚定王), was an official of the Chinese Five Dynasties and Ten Kingdoms Period state Wu, serving as junior regent under his father, the senior regent Xu Zhigao (later known as Li Bian), who would later found Wu's successor state Southern Tang.

== Background ==
Xu Jingqian was born in 919, when his father Xu Zhigao was serving as Wu's junior regent, overseeing the government at the capital Guangling (廣陵, in modern Yangzhou, Jiangsu), while his adoptive grandfather (Xu Zhigao's adoptive father) Xu Wen, the senior regent, was controlling the army at his headquarters at Sheng Prefecture (昇州, in modern Nanjing, Jiangsu). He was Xu Zhigao's second son. Both he and his older brother Xu Jingtong were born of Xu Zhigao's second wife Lady Song Fujin, as would two younger brothers (Xu Jingsui and Xu Jingda). He was said to be alert in his youth, with a good memory such that, after reading, he would not forget what he had read.

== Service in the Wu government ==
It was said that after Xu Jingqian became older, he was elegant in his behavior and appearance, and he had a peaceful disposition. He married the Wu emperor Yang Pu's daughter Princess Shangrao, and therefore was given the traditional title for a princess' husband, Fuma Duwei (駙馬都尉). Despite his high status, he was said to be frugal and not living luxuriously.

Xu Jingqian started his governmental service as the commander of the cavalry and infantry soldiers in his father Xu Zhigao's headquarters (at that time, Xu Zhigao had succeeded Xu Wen as regent, and also had his headquarters at Sheng), and later served as the military prefect (團練使, Tuanlianshi) of Hai Prefecture (海州, in modern Lianyungang, Jiangsu). In 934, Xu Zhigao recalled his older brother Xu Jingtong, who had been serving as junior regent at Guangling, back to Jinling (i.e., Sheng) to serve as the deputy supreme commander of the circuits (whereas Xu Zhigao himself was the supreme commander), while commissioning Xu Jingqian as the commander of the left and right armies, Zuo Pushe (左僕射, one of the heads of the executive bureau of government (尚書省, Shangshu Sheng)), and chancellor with the designation of Can Zhengshi (參政事), leaving him at Guangling to take over as junior regent.

In 935, Xu Jingqian was given the greater chancellor designation of Tong Zhongshu Menxia Pingzhangshi (同中書門下平章事). Xu Zhigao had the official Chen Jue, whose abilities he regarded highly, serve on Xu Jingqian's staff, to assist him.

In 936, by which time Xu Jingqian also carried the honorary title of Taibao (太保), he fell ill. He was removed from his positions on account of his illness, and his younger brother Xu Jingsui replaced him as junior regent. He died in 937, before his father Xu Zhigao seized the Wu throne and established his own state of Southern Tang. His wife Princess Shangrao also died not long after. Xu Zhigao (who changed his name to Li Bian after taking the throne) posthumously created him the Prince of Gaoping. After Xu Jingtong (who had been renamed Li Jing by that point) became emperor, he further posthumously created Xu Jingqian the Prince of Chu.

== Notes and references ==
- Spring and Autumn Annals of the Ten Kingdoms, vol. 19.
- Zizhi Tongjian, vols. 279, 280, 281.
