= Song Fujin =

Song Fujin (宋福金) (died 945), formally Empress Yuanjing (元敬皇后, "the discerning and alert empress"), was the empress and second wife of Li Bian (Xu Zhigao), the founding emperor of the Chinese Five Dynasties and Ten Kingdoms Period state Southern Tang (Emperor Liezu), and the mother of four of his five sons, including his successor Li Jing (Xu Jingtong) (Emperor Yuanzong).

== Background ==
It is not known when Song Fujin was born. It is further not known where she was born, although it is known that her father Song Wen (宋韞) was from Jiangxia (江夏, in modern Wuhan, Hubei). In her youth, she became caught up in warfare, and was eventually taken into the household of Wang Rong (王戎), a prefect of Sheng Prefecture (昇州, in modern Nanjing, Jiangsu) during Wu.

At some point, Wang Rong gave his daughter in marriage to Xu Zhigao, the adoptive son of the Wu regent Xu Wen (although it is not known whether Xu Wen was already regent at that time). Lady Song was also sent to the Xu household to serve as Lady Wang's servant girl, and eventually became a concubine of Xu Zhigao's. As concubine, she gave birth to his oldest son Xu Jingtong.

== As Xu Zhigao's wife during Wu ==
As some point (before 927), Lady Wang died. At Xu Wen's direction, Xu Zhigao elevated Lady Song to the status of wife. As Xu Zhigao was then serving as the junior regent, in control of the Wu imperial government at the capital Guangling (廣陵, in modern Yangzhou, Jiangsu) with Xu Wen himself stationed at Jinling (金陵, i.e., Sheng Prefecture), Lady Song was created the Lady of Guangping, and later the greater title of Lady of Jin. It was said that she governed the household capably, and did not often smile or joke. In addition to Xu Jingtong, she would bear three more sons for Xu Zhigao — Xu Jingqian, Xu Jingsui, and Xu Jingda.

When Xu Wen died in 927, Xu Zhigao was originally set to immediately head for Jinling to attend to the funeral affairs. However, as at that time Xu Zhigao was engulfed in a struggle for control of the Wu state with his younger brother Xu Zhixun — who was the oldest among Xu Wen's surviving biological sons and considered himself entitled to succeed Xu Wen — Lady Song urged him not to go, stating to him:

It is not unusual for a subject and a son to transfer his filial piety to faithfulness for the state. Right now, you are powerful and important to the state, but endangered. For you to abandon the authority you hold would be like to turn [the famed sword] Tai'a [(太阿)] around and handing the hilt to someone else.

Xu Zhigao realized what she was stating — that he would be putting himself at Xu Zhixun's mercy if he went, as Xu Zhixun controlled Jinling and the army that Xu Wen commanded at the time — and did not go. (Xu Zhigao was later able to trick Xu Zhixun into coming to Guangling, and he then kept Xu Zhixun at Guangling, not allowing him to return to Jinling; it was only after that point that Xu Zhigao was in secure control of the state.)

In 935, as part of Xu Zhigao's plan to take over the throne, he had Yang Pu create him the Prince of Qi. Lady Song thus took the title of princess.

== As empress of Southern Tang ==
In 937, Xu Zhigao had Yang Pu yield the throne to him, ending Wu and starting Southern Tang. He created Princess Song empress. In 939, he changed his family name from the adoptive name of Xu to his birth name of Li (and also took on a new person name of Bian) and observed a mourning period for his birth parents where he and Empress Song wore mourning clothes and lived in a straw house for 54 days.

It was said that, as empress, Empress Song often advised Li Bian regarding proposals and reports that his officials submitted to him, and he found her advice beneficial, stating, "Even as my own thoughts had not reached the right conclusion, the Empress has already understood correctly." Also, toward the end of his reign, when medications given to him by alchemists altered his personality to be harsher and less patient, it was said that many attendants and officials were punished, but it was often intercession by the empress that saved many people. However, by this point, Li Bian's favorite consort was Consort Zhong, who bore the only son of his who was not born of Empress Song, Li Jingti (李景逷), whom he also favored. However, when Consort Zhong tried to use Li Bian's favor for her and for Li Jingti to try to get him to divert his succession plans from Empress Song's oldest son Li Jing (i.e., Xu Jingtong) to Li Jingti, Li Bian was offended and had Consort Zhong thrown out of the palace and remarried to someone else, ending her machinations.

Li Bian died in 943, and was set to be succeeded by Li Jing. The chancellor Sun Sheng, however, was concerned at the possibility that a number of Li Jing's close associates, including Wei Cen (魏岑), Feng Yanji, and Feng Yanlu (馮延魯), whom he considered wicked, might take power. He therefore wanted to manufacture an order in Li Bian's name ordering that Empress Song serve as regent. However, Empress Song herself did not find this appropriate, pointing out that she did not want to be like Wu Zetian, and the imperial scholar Li Yiye (李貽業) also found it unlikely that Li Bian, who often spoke against the idea of women in control of the state, would authorize such a regency, and Sun thus dropped the idea, fearing a public dispute.

== As empress dowager ==
After Li Jing took the throne, he honored Empress Song empress dowager. It was said that the empress dowager, due to her hatred of Consort Zhong, had wanted to kill Li Jingti, but Li Jing, who created Li Jingti the Prince of Baoning, protected him. He also created Consort Zhong princess dowager, and had her live with Li Jingti.

It was said that whenever Li Jing went to pay homage to his mother, Empress Dowager Song would thank him for his goodness and diligence, and would not talk about governance at all, stating that it is not good for a state for a woman to be involved in what happened outside the palace. She died in 945 and was buried with Li Bian.

== Notes and references ==
- Spring and Autumn Annals of the Ten Kingdoms, vol. 18.
- Zizhi Tongjian, vols. 281, 283, 285.

Chinese nobility
Preceded by None (dynasty founded)	Empress of Southern Tang; 937–943	Succeeded by Empress Zhong
Preceded by Empress Wang of Wu	Empress of China (Jiangsu/Anhui/Jiangxi/Eastern Hubei); 937–943	Succeeded by Empress Zhong
