= Li Decheng =

Li Decheng (李德誠) (863-August 5, 940), formally Prince Zhongyi of Zhao (趙忠懿王), was a prominent general of the Chinese Five Dynasties and Ten Kingdoms Period Wu state. He and his family would remain highly honored during the time of Wu's successor state Southern Tang.

== Background ==
Li Decheng was born in 863, during the reign of Emperor Yizong of Tang. He was from Guangling (廣陵, in modern Yangzhou, Jiangsu — although an alternative account indicated that he was from Xihua (西華, in modern Zhoukou, Henan). In his youth, he came under the service of the late-Tang warlord Zhao Huang, who was then the governor (觀察使, Guangchashi) of Xuanshe Circuit (宣歙, headquartered in modern Xuancheng, Anhui).

As of 889, Zhao and his capital Xuan Prefecture (宣州) were under the siege by another warlord, Yang Xingmi the prefect of Lu Prefecture (廬州, in modern Hefei, Anhui). The siege became desperate enough that Zhao's officer Zhou Jinsi (周進思) expelled Zhao and defended the city himself. Zhao tried to flee to Guangling (which was then under the control of the greater warlord Sun Ru, who then ruled Huainan Circuit (淮南, headquartered at Guangling), but was captured by Yang (and subsequently executed). It was said that during Zhao's expulsion and capture, only Li and another officer, Han Qiu (韓球), did not abandon him, and apparently were also captured by Yang. Yang was set to send Li back into the city to try to persuade Zhou to surrender, but Li fell ill at that time, so Yang sent Han, whom Zhou promptly executed. However, the other officers in the city soon seized Zhou and surrendered. Impressed with Li, Yang gave the daughter of a clansman to him in marriage.

== Service under Yang Xingmi during Tang ==
Yang Xingmi took over Xuanshe, which then-reigning Emperor Zhaozong (Emperor Yizong's son) then upgraded into Ningguo Circuit (寧國) and made Yang its military governor (Jiedushi). Yang then entered into an alliance with the major warlord Zhu Quanzhong the military governor of Xuanwu Circuit (宣武, headquartered in modern Kaifeng, Henan), against Sun Ru. In 891, Sun, believing that he should destroy Yang first, decided to abandon Guangling and take his entire army south against Yang's Ningguo army. He thus set fire to the city of Guangling and departed it. In the aftermaths of the city's burning, Yang sent Zhang Xun (張訓) and Li Decheng to Guangling, to put out the fires in the city and to save the grain there so that the people would not starve. Subsequently, when another warlord, Shi Pu the military governor of Wuning Circuit (武寧, headquartered in modern Xuzhou, Jiangsu) tried to head south to take over Huainan, Yang sent Li and Zhang Xun to face him, and they defeated and repelled him at Chu Prefecture (楚州, in modern Huai'an, Jiangsu), forcing him to withdraw; they also then used this opportunity to seize Chu's prefect Liu Zan (劉瓚) and take over that prefecture for Yang. Yang later defeated Sun, took over Huainan, and eventually took the entire region.

In 903, Tian Jun the military governor of Ningguo and An Renyi (安仁義) the military prefect (團練使, Tuanlianshi) of Run Prefecture (潤州, in modern Zhenjiang, Jiangsu), both Yang's vassals, jointly rose in rebellion against him. Tian was soon defeated and killed by Yang's general Tai Meng (臺濛), and another Yang general, Wang Maozhang then put Run under siege, but because An was a capable defender, the city's defense held up to spring 905, when Wang's forces finally entered the city by digging a tunnel in. Nevertheless, An held out in a tower, and initially, the Huainan forces did not dare to approach it. However, as Li, who participated in the siege effort, remained civil to An throughout the siege whereas the other Huainan generals were insulting, An stated to him, "You are polite. I am going to make myself your accomplishment." An then descended the tower, surrendered to Li, and further gave his favorite concubine to Li. Li delivered him and his sons to Guangling, where they were executed. Yang then commissioned Li as the prefect of Run.

== During Hongnong/Wu ==
Later, by which time Tang had fallen and Yang Xingmi's domain, which was ruled successively by his sons Yang Wo and Yang Longyan, became known as Hongnong, and then Wu. However, the power soon fell effectively into the hands of the regent Xu Wen, as he and another general, Zhang Hao, had assassinated Yang Wo, and he then killed Zhang and supported Yang Longyan as Yang Wo's successor. As Li, as the prefect of Run, had a habit of visiting the area outside the city at night, Xu came to suspect him of plotting against Xu's governance, and therefore moved him to Jiang Prefecture (江州, in modern Jiujiang, Jiangxi). Realizing that Xu suspected him, Li sent his fourth son Li Jianxun to pay homage to Xu. Xu was impressed by Li Jianxun's studiousness and believed that this showed Li Decheng was not intending rebellion. He further gave a daughter to Li Jianxun in marriage.

Li Decheng was later made the military governor of Weiwu Circuit (威武, somewhat of an honorary title, as Weiwu was traditionally headquartered in modern Fuzhou, Fujian, then under the control of Wu's southeastern neighbor Min) and put in charge of Fu Prefecture (撫州, in modern Fuzhou, Jiangxi — not the same Fuzhou as Weiwu's traditional headquarter site). While he was at Fu, there was an occasion when the arrogant junior regent Xu Zhixun (Xu Wen's oldest biological son), hearing that Li had many singing girls in his household, demanded that Li give some to him. When Li responded that these singing girls were too old for Xu and that he would try to find younger and more beautiful ones for Xu, Xu responded to Li's messenger, "One day I will kill Li Decheng and take even his wife!" (However, this threat was never carried out, as Xu Zhixun himself was thereafter assassinated by the general Zhu Jin and replaced by his far more civil adoptive brother Xu Zhigao.) At some point (unclear when), another marital connection was made between the two families, as one of Li's daughters married Xu Zhigao's son Xu Jingda.

In 919, when Yang Longyan declared himself the King of Wu (as an independent ruler away from any titles bestowed by the now defunct Tang state), Li Decheng was given the honorary chancellor title of Zhongshu Ling (中書令) and Pingnan Dajiangjun (平南大將軍). Shortly after, he was transferred to Baisheng Circuit (百勝, headquartered in modern Ganzhou, Jiangxi). Later, during the Dahe era (929-935) of Yang Longyan's brother and successor Yang Pu (who was then carrying the title of emperor), Li was made the military governor of Zhennan Circuit (鎮南, headquartered in modern Nanchang, Jiangxi). It was said that while Li had no great accomplishments on the battlefield, his seniority allowed him to become greatly honored.

By 936, Xu Zhigao, who was then senior regent, was planning to have Yang Pu yield the throne to him. As he believed Li and Zhou Ben to be the most senior generals of the realm and that having their outward support would affirm his power, he had them go to Guangling to lead the officials in petitioning Yang Pu to do so, and then go to Jinling (where Xu was then stationed as regent) to petition him to accept. This led the senior official Song Qiqiu, who was a long-time friend of Xu's but opposed all this, to state to Li Jianxun, "Your honored father was a great contributor to Emperor Taizu [(i.e., Yang Xingmi)], but now his accomplishments are destroyed." Song also apparently wrote a letter to Li, trying to stop him. However, Xu soon accepted the throne, ending Wu and starting Southern Tang.

== During Southern Tang ==
After Xu Zhigao took the throne, he feasted with the high-level officials, and at the feast, Li Decheng showed Song Qiqiu's letter to him. However, Xu refused to read it, although Song nevertheless apologized. Xu bestowed on Li Decheng the honorary title Taishi (太師) and created him the Prince of Nanping.

After the transition, for some time, Yang Pu, whom Xu still honored with the title of "Rang Huang" (讓皇, "emperor who yielded"), continued to reside at Wu's former palace at Guangling, but he was apprehensive and wanted to move out. Li Decheng also spoke in favor of moving Yang, and thereafter Xu sent Li Jianxun to Guangling to escort Yang and his family to the inner city of Run Prefecture, which Xu renamed Danyang Palace to serve as the Yang family's residence.

In 939, Xu Zhigao changed his family name back from his adoptive family name of Xu to his original family name of Li and also took on a new personal name of Bian. A controversy thereafter evolved whether Xu Jingda, whose name was also then changed to Li Jingda, then the Prince of Xin, could remain married to Li Decheng's daughter, as Chinese traditions against endogamy prohibited the marriage between persons of the same family name. Li Bian issued an edict stating that due to the great accomplishments of Li Decheng, the marriage should remain intact; rather, he ordered that the Princess of Xin use Nanping as her family name.

Li Decheng was later given the greater title of Prince of Zhao. He died in 940.

== Notes and references ==
- Spring and Autumn Annals of the Ten Kingdoms, vol. 7.
- Zizhi Tongjian, vols. 258, 259, 265, 270, 280, 281.
