= Wang Lingmou =

Wang Lingmou (Chinese: 王令謀) (died October 10, 937) was a close associate of Xu Zhigao (later known as Li Bian), the regent of the Chinese Five Dynasties and Ten Kingdoms Period state Wu. As Xu's close associate, Wang served as a chancellor of Wu late in its history, and urged Xu to take over its throne, but died shortly before Xu actually did (founding Southern Tang).

== As Xu Zhigao's staff member ==
It is not known when Wang Lingmou was born or where he was from.

As of 912, Xu Zhigao's adoptive father Xu Wen was the regent of Wu. As a result, Xu Zhigao became the prefect of Sheng Prefecture (昇州, in modern Nanjing, Jiangsu), and he built a staff of capable people around him. Wang, at some point, became a guest at his household, and eventually became his secretary. Wang became a key strategist for him, along with Song Qiqiu and Wang Hong (王翃).

In 918, by which time Xu Wen was remotely controlling the Wu political scene after stationing himself at Sheng Prefecture, Xu Zhigao was serving as the military prefect (團練使, Tuanlianshi) of Run Prefecture (潤州, in modern Zhenjiang, Jiangsu), while Xu Wen's oldest biological son Xu Zhixun was serving as junior regent at Wu's capital Guangling. That year, Xu Zhixun was assassinated by the general Zhu Jin, and as all of Xu Wen's other biological sons were young, Xu Wen had Xu Zhigao take over as junior regent at Guangling. It was apparently at that time that Wang Lingmou became one of the military commanders at Yang Prefecture (揚州, i.e., Guangling). In 919, when then-reigning Prince of Wu, Yang Longyan, took the greater title of King of Wu at Xu Wen's urging, Wang Lingmou was made the director of palace communications (內樞密使, Nei Shumishi).

In 927, Xu Wen died. Xu Zhigao subsequently engaged in a power struggle with a younger adoptive brother (Xu Wen's biological son), Xu Zhixun (younger), as Xu Zhigao controlled the court scene at Guangling, but the younger Xu Zhixun controlled Wu's largest army, then at Sheng Prefecture. Wang continued to provide strategies for Xu Zhigao, and pointed out to him that he needed not to worry about the younger Xu Zhixun, as the younger Xu Zhixun was young and not capable in managing personal relationships with other officials. Not too long after, Xu Zhigao was able to trick the younger Xu Zhixun into coming to Guangling to defend himself against various accusations. Xu Zhigao detained the younger Xu Zhixun and took over his troops, ending the younger Xu Zhixun's challenge to his status as regent.

== As chancellor ==
Shortly after Xu Zhigao's prevailing over the younger Xu Zhixun, Wang Lingmou was given the designation Tong Zhongshu Menxia Pingzhangshi (同中書門下平章事), making him a chancellor. In 931, when Xu Zhigao, following Xu Wen's example, left Guangling to take up position at Jinling (i.e., Sheng Prefecture), he left his son Xu Jingtong at Guangling to serve as junior regent. At that time, Wang was made You Pushe (右僕射, one of the heads of the executive bureau of government (尚書省, Shangshu Sheng)) and Menxia Shilang (門下侍郎, the deputy head of the examination bureau (門下省, Menxia Sheng)), and continued to serve as chancellor, along with Song Qiqiu.

In 934, Wang was given the additional titles of Situ (司徒, one of the Three Excellencies) and military governor (Jiedushi) of Zhongwu Circuit (忠武, headquartered in modern Xuchang, Henan). (The latter title was completely honorary, as Zhongwu was then the territory of Wu's northwestern neighbor Later Tang.)

In 937, Wang personally went to Jinling to urge Xu Zhigao (who had changed his name to Xu Gao by that point and carried that title of Prince of Qi) to accept the throne from then-Wu emperor Yang Pu. Xu Gao did not do so at that time. At that time, Wang himself was ill, and was described to be in such old age that he was toothless. When people urged him to retire, he stated, "The great works for the Prince of Qi are not done. How can I rest myself?" He again wrote a petition urging Xu to accept the throne. Shortly after, apparently persuaded, Xu had Yang issue an edict passing the throne to him, and a group of high-level Wu officials went from Guangling to Jinling to urge him to take the throne. Before Xu accepted, however, Wang died.

== Notes and references ==
- Spring and Autumn Annals of the Ten Kingdoms, vol. 10.
- Zizhi Tongjian, vols. 268, 270, 276, 277, 281.
