= Yang Lian (prince) =

Yang Lian (楊璉) (died 940), formally Prince Jing of Hongnong (弘農靖王), was a crown prince of the Chinese Five Dynasties and Ten Kingdoms period state Wu. He died not long after his father, Wu's last ruler Yang Pu (Emperor Rui), was forced to yield the throne to the powerful regent Xu Gao (Southern Tang's Emperor Liezu), and it was commonly thought that the death was at the order of the new emperor.

== During Wu ==
It is not known when Yang Lian was born. He was the oldest son of Yang Pu (Emperor Rui), but historical records did not indicate who his mother was. In 928, shortly after Yang Pu had claimed the title of Emperor of Wu at the behest of the late regent Xu Wen, he created his brothers, his sons, and one of his nephews imperial princes, and Yang Lian was created the Prince of Jiangdu. In 930, he created Yang Lian crown prince.

In spring 937, when Xu Wen's adoptive son and successor Xu Zhigao was deep in the process of taking over the throne from Yang Pu (having, by that point, received the title of Prince of Qi and a number of other honorifics in that process), Xu Zhigao gave a daughter in marriage to Yang Lian to be his crown princess.

== During Southern Tang ==
In winter 937, Yang Pu passed the throne to Xu Gao (Xu Zhigao's having changed his name to Xu Gao earlier in the year), ending Wu and starting a new Southern Tang state with Xu Gao as its Emperor Liezu. Emperor Liezu continued to honor Yang Pu with an imperial title, while creating Yang Lian the Duke of Hongnong and giving him the honorary titles of military governor (Jiedushi) of Pinglu Circuit (平盧, headquartered in modern Weifang, Shandong) and Zhongshu Ling (中書令). When the new Southern Tang's emperor's former chief strategist Song Qiqiu, wanting to show himself faithful to the new regime, suggested that Yang Pu be moved away from the former Wu capital Jiangdu (江都, in modern Yangzhou, Jiangsu), that the marriage between Yang Lian and his wife, now carrying both the titles of duchess and Princess Yongxing, be terminated, and that Yang Lian be exiled, the new Southern Tang emperor did not accept any of those suggestions. Indeed, the former crown princess was distressed whenever people referred to her by her title of Princess Yongxing. This caused her brothers to be displeased with her, but Emperor Liezu stated:

Being loyal to her husband's house and being distant from her father's house is a virtue for a woman. What fault does she have?

Yang Pu died around the new year 939 — a death for which the Southern Tang emperor was much suspected of. Shortly after, in summer 939, Emperor Liezu had the Yang clan members confined to Yongning Palace (永寧宮) in Tai Prefecture (泰州, in modern Taizhou, Jiangsu), including Yang Lian's cousin Yang Gong (楊珙) the military governor of Kanghua Circuit (康化, headquartered in modern Chizhou, Anhui). Yang Lian, however, did not appear to be confined, and shortly after was offered the position of military governor of Kanghua. He declined at that time, asking to serve out the three-year mourning period for Yang Pu, and the Southern Tang emperor agreed.

However, it appeared that Yang Lian did accept the posting to Kanghua eventually, for he was referred to as the military governor of Kanghua in 940. (Corroborating this was that, in the biography of his wife Princess Yongxing, she was mentioned to have accompanied Yang Lian to Kanghua's capital Chi Prefecture (池州)). In spring 940, Yang Lian went to pay respects to his father's tomb, Pingling (平陵). As he was returning from Pingling, one night, when he was very drunk, he died in the boat. (The circumstances caused suspicions that the Southern Tang emperor ordered his death.) Emperor Liezu posthumously created him the Prince of Hongnong and gave him the posthumous name of Jing (靖, "comforting"). Princess Yongxing returned to the Southern Tang palace at Jinling, wore mourning clothes, and refused to remarry for the rest of her life, which did not last long.

== Notes and references ==
- Spring and Autumn Annals of the Ten Kingdoms, vol. 4.
- Zizhi Tongjian, vols. 276, 277, 281, 282.
