= Li Jingda =

- Born: 924
- Died: 971 (aged 46–47)
- Spouse: Daughter of Li Decheng
Posthumous name
- Zhaoxiao 昭孝; Imperial Brother (Crown Prince) Zhaoxiao
- Father: Li Bian
- Mother: Song Fujin

Li Jingda (Chinese: 李景達; 924–971), né Xu Jingda (徐景達), courtesy name Zitong (子通), nickname Yushi (雨師), posthumous name Crown Prince Zhaoxiao (昭孝太弟), was an imperial prince (but not crown prince) of the Southern Tang dynasty of China.

== Background ==
Xu Jingda was born in 924, as the fourth son of his parents Xu Zhigao and Lady Song Fujin. (Older than he were Xu Jingtong, Xu Jingqian, and Xu Jingsui; a younger half-brother, Li Jingti (李景逷), born of Lady Zhong, would be born later.) At that time, Xu Zhigao was newly made the junior regent for the state of Wu, and there happened to be a severe drought, causing Xu Zhigao much distress. He sacrificed for rain, and it happened that Xu Jingda was born that day. Xu Zhigao was happy and believed his birth to be a good omen, and therefore gave him the nickname of Yushi (meaning, "army of rain"). As he grew in childhood, it was said that he had an impressive appearance and a direct, magnanimous disposition, unlike other children, and Xu Zhigao much favored him. At some point, he married a daughter of the senior Wu general Li Decheng.

== During Li Bian's reign ==
In 937, Xu Zhigao, then regent, had Wu's emperor Yang Pu yield the throne to him, ending Wu and starting a new state of Southern Tang. While Xu Jingda's older brothers Xu Jingtong (whose name was then changed to Xu Jing) and Xu Jingsui were given princely titles later that year, Xu Jingda initially was not, but was only given the title of Duke of Shouyang. (The other older brother, Xu Jingqian, had died shortly before the state transition due to illness.) In 939, he, and the rest of his family, took the family name of Li, which was his father's birth name. (Xu Zhigao also took a new personal name and became known as Li Bian.) Li Jingda received a princely title shortly after — variously referred to as Prince of Xuancheng or Prince of Xin. As a result of the name change, a controversy developed over whether he could remain married to his wife Princess Li, as a marriage between two people of the same family name was disallowed under Chinese traditions against endogamy. Li Bian decreed that due to Li Decheng's great accomplishments, the marriage shall remain valid, and that the princess was to take on the new family name of Nanping (as her father Li Decheng carried the title of Prince of Nanping). Throughout the years, Li Bian, impressed by Li Jingda's open disposition, had considered making him the heir to the throne, and the chancellor Song Qiqiu had also often praised his talent. However, Li Bian hesitated, and eventually did not do so, because Li Jing was older. (Still, Li Jing was never created crown prince, although his title of Prince of Qi was ceremonially greater than any other prince's as it was a title that both Li Bian and his adoptive father Xu Wen, who was Li Bian's predecessor as regent, had carried (in Xu Wen's case, posthumously).)

== During Li Jing's reign ==
Li Bian died in 943, and Li Jing succeeded him as emperor. Li Jing created Li Jingda the greater title of Prince of E. Li Jingda apparently also received additional titles of defender of the eastern capital Jiangdu (江都, in modern Yangzhou, Jiangsu), military governor of Tianping Circuit (天平, headquartered in modern Tai'an, Shandong — a completely honorary office as Tianping was then the territory of Southern Tang's northern neighbor Later Jin), and honorary chancellor title of Shizhong (侍中).

Later in the year, believing that it was Li Bian's wish, Li Jing publicly declared his intent to eventually pass the throne, in order, to Li Jingsui and Li Jingda. He thus gave the title of Prince of Qi to Li Jingsui and had Li Jingsui move into the eastern palace — the traditional residence for crown princes, although Li Jingsui did not receive that title at that time — and gave Li Jingsui's old title, Prince of Yan, to Li Jingda. Li Jingsui and Li Jingda also, respectively, were made the generalissimo of the armies of all circuits and deputy generalissimo. They tried to decline these honors, but Li Jing would not let them.

Meanwhile, by 945, Song Qiqiu was in retirement, but unhappily so. In 945, Li Jingda's staff member Xie Zhongxuan (謝仲宣) argued to Li Jingda that leaving Song, whose reputation as a top adviser to LI Bian was well-known, in retirement would merely cause the people to be disappointed. Li Jingda relayed Xie's arguments to Li Jing, who agreed, and therefore had Li Jingda go see Song to recall him to the imperial government.

In 947, Li Jing formally created Li Jingsui crown prince. He gave the Prince of Qi title to Li Jingda, and the Prince of Yan title that Li Jingda carried to his (Li Jing's) oldest son Li Hongji, who previously was Prince of Nanchang. Li Jingda and Li Hongji were also made generalissimo and deputy generalissimo, respectively. Meanwhile, in the frequent feasts that Li Jing had with family members and close associates, Li Jing's close associates Feng Yanji, Feng Yanlu (馮延魯), Wei Cen (魏岑), and Chen Jue spent much time in flattery and inappropriate humor, drawing frequent rebukes from the stern Li Jingda. On one occasion, Feng Yanji, who actually had no part in Li Jing's plan to eventually pass the throne to Li Jingsui and Li Jingda, wanted to nevertheless create the impression that he was involved, to draw gratitude from the two princes. He thus pretended to be drunk, and he caressed Li Jingda's back and stated, "You should not forget me!" Li Jingda, finding this inappropriate, was incensed, and he immediately went to see Li Jing, requesting Feng's execution. Li Jing had to spend much time dissuading him. The official Zhang Yi (張易), however, later pointed out to Li Jingda that his repeated attempts to remove Li Jing's close associates were not having the effect that he wanted, and might create incentive for them to falsely accuse him. Li Jingda saw Zhang's point and agreed; after that, he often declined to attend feasts to avoid conflict with Li Jing's associates.

In 956, Southern Tang was under a major attack by its northern neighbor Later Zhou (which had succeeded Later Jin's successor state Later Han). Li Jing commissioned Li Jingda to command the main Southern Tang army to face the main Later Zhou army, commanded by the Later Zhou emperor Guo Rong. However, he also commissioned Chen as Li Jingda's army monitor, and Chen became effectively in command. (The official Han Xizai tried to argue against this, pointing out that there was no one more trusted and honored than Li Jingda, and that having an army monitor was inappropriate.) Indeed, it was said that because Li Jingda lacked talent in military matters, he essentially was only signing orders that Chen had already decided on, and that the army had low morale as a result. In particular, one of the tasks that Li Jingda's army, 50,000-men strong, was supposed to carry out was to relieve the Later Zhou siege on the important border city Shou Prefecture (壽州, in modern Lu'an, Anhui), but while the army advanced to Hao Prefecture (濠州, in modern Chuzhou, Anhui), not far from Shou, it did not advance further to actually engage the Later Zhou sieging army. He did dispatch some generals to make repeated attempts to advance toward Shou, but each time was repelled by the Later Zhou forces. He also rejected the proposal by Shou's commander Liu Renzhan (劉仁瞻) for Liu to lead his army out of the city for a pitched battle with the Later Zhou army. Faced with the continuing siege, Liu fell ill. Further, at this time, Chen tried to strip the successful, but often disobedient general Zhu Yuan (朱元) of his command, causing Zhu to surrender to Later Zhou and further weakening the Southern Tang position. A final attempt by Li Jingda's army to assault the Later Zhou sieging army resulted in a crushing defeat for Southern Tang, with the generals Xu Wenzhen (許文稹), Bian Hao, and Yang Shouzhong (楊守忠) all captured. Li Jingda and Chen had to flee back to the capital Jinling. With Liu near death from his illness, the Southern Tang garrison at Shou surrendered.

In light of the mounting defeats, Li Jingsui, who had previously declined the crown prince position, again offered to yield the position, pointing out that he was unable to aid the state while Li Hongji, who was in charge of the southeastern front with Wuyue (which, as a Later Zhou vassal state, had tried to invade Southern Tang as well but had been repelled by Li Hongji's subordinate Chai Zaiyong (柴再用)). Li Jingda also offered to resign as generalissimo. Li Jing agreed this time, creating Li Hongji crown prince to replace Li Jingsui, while sending Li Jingsui and Li Jingda out of the capital to serve as regional governors, as they requested. In Li Jingda's case, he was initially given the titles of generalissimo of Zhexi (浙西, i.e., Zhenhai Circuit (鎮海, headquartered in modern Zhenjiang, Jiangsu)) as well as the commandant of Zhenhai's capital Run Prefecture (潤州). However, as Zhenhai was then still involved in the campaign against Later Zhou, he declined it, and was thereafter made the commandant of Fu Prefecture (撫州, in modern Fuzhou, Jiangxi). (Li Jing was eventually able to negotiate a peace agreement with Guo, with Southern Tang formally becoming a vassal state to Later Zhou and ceding all of its territory north of the Yangtze River to Later Zhou.) It was said that after the defeat at Shou, Li Jingda spent much of his time in drinking, and that, at Fu Prefecture, he did not attend much to the governance of the circuit (i.e., Zhaowu Circuit (昭武), headquartered at Fu) and entrusted the matters to his staff members.

== During Li Yu's reign ==
Li Jing died in 961, and was succeeded by his son Li Congjia, who then changed his name to Li Yu. (Li Hongji had died earlier, and was succeeded as crown prince by Li Congjia, who was his younger brother.) Li Yu bestowed on Li Jingda the additional honorary titles of Taishi (太師) and Shangshu Ling (尚書令), showing great respect to him.

Li Jingda died in 971. By his own wishes, he was buried at Mount Lu. Li Yu posthumously honored him crown prince.

== Notes and references ==
- Spring and Autumn Annals of the Ten Kingdoms, vol. 19.
- Zizhi Tongjian, vols. 281, 282, 283, 285, 286, 293, 294.
