= Song Qiqiu =

Chinese strategist

Song Qiqiu 宋齊丘
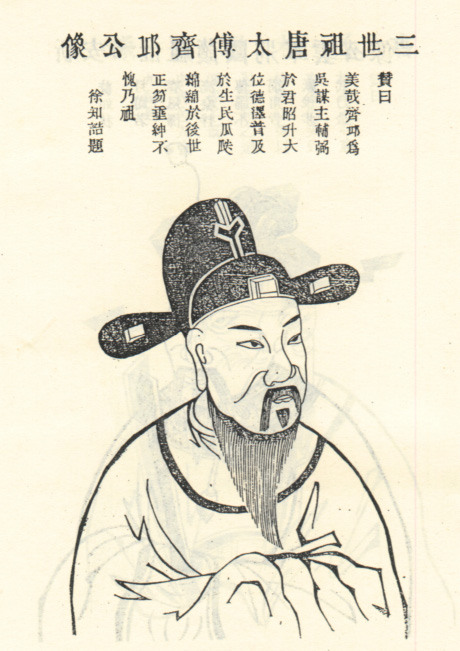

Personal details
- Born: 887 Hong Prefecture, Tang Empire
- Died: 959 Mount Jiuhua, Southern Tang
- Spouse: Lady Wei (魏)
- Parent: Song Cheng (宋誠) (father)

Song Qiqiu
- Traditional Chinese: 宋齊丘
- Simplified Chinese: 宋齐丘
Transcriptions
Standard Mandarin
- Hanyu Pinyin: Sòng Qíqiū

Song Zisong
- Chinese: 宋子嵩
Transcriptions
Standard Mandarin
- Hanyu Pinyin: Sòng Zǐsōng

Song Qiqiu (887–959), courtesy name Zisong, formally Duke Chouliao of Chu (楚醜繆公), was the chief strategist of Emperor Liezu of Southern Tang (Xu Zhigao/Li Bian), the founding emperor of the Chinese Five Dynasties and Ten Kingdoms period state Southern Tang. His strategies were viewed as instrumental in allowing Xu Zhigao to consolidate his power during the latter part of the regency of Xu Wen, Xu Zhigao's adoptive father and regent of Wu, eventually allowing Xu Zhigao to take over the Wu state and take the throne as the emperor of Southern Tang. After the establishment of Southern Tang, Song had a falling out with Emperor Liezu and largely lost his power, but became powerful again during the reign of Emperor Liezu's son Emperor Yuanzong, until he eventually lost the trust of the emperor and committed suicide in 959.

== Background ==
Song Qiqiu was born in 887, during the late Tang dynasty. His family had been from Luling (廬陵, in modern Ji'an, Jiangxi) for generations. In his youth, he was studious and ambitious, and was particularly well-learned in strategies.

Song Qiqiu's father Song Cheng (宋誠), at some point, served as the deputy military governor to the late Tang warlord Zhong Chuan the military governor of Zhennan Circuit (鎮南, headquartered in modern Nanchang, Jiangxi). After Song Cheng's death, Song Qiqiu thus remained at Zhennan and became dependent on Zhong and Zhong's family (apparently including Zhong's son and successor Zhong Kuangshi). At some point, he apparently became a candidate for imperial examinations, but it was unclear whether he actually stood for those examinations.

== During Hongnong/Wu ==
In 906, Zhennan was conquered by Yang Wo, the ruler of rival Huainan Circuit (淮南, headquartered in modern Yangzhou, Jiangsu). With the Zhongs thus no longer in control, Song Qiqiu became impoverished, and was forced to follow a group of people to head to Huainan proper to try to make a living. He eventually was forced to work for a house of prostitution run by a Lady Wei, apparently at Sheng Prefecture (昇州, in modern Nanjing, Jiangsu). Lady Wei supplied him with money, and he eventually took her as his wife.

In 912, by which point Huainan (and other affiliated circuits, including Zhennan) essentially constituted an independent state of Wu ruled titularly by Yang Wo's brother and successor Yang Longyan but was actually being ruled by Yang Longyan's regent Xu Wen, Xu Wen's adoptive son Xu Zhigao was made the prefect of Sheng Prefecture. He was building a staff and welcomed talented people as staff members. Song offered his poems to Xu Zhigao through the officer Yao Kezhan (姚克瞻) to show his talent. Xu Zhigao was impressed with his talent and invited him to serve on staff. Song thereafter became a chief strategist for Xu Zhigao.

By 917, Xu Zhigao was said to have built Sheng Prefecture into such a prosperous city that, when his adoptive father Xu Wen visited, he came to like the city, and therefore set his headquarters there. He promoted Xu Zhigao to be the military prefect (團練使, Tuanlianshi) of Run Prefecture (潤州, in modern Zhenjiang, Jiangsu), where his headquarters had previously been, despite Xu Zhigao's wishes to be given Xuan Prefecture (宣州, in modern Xuancheng, Anhui). Initially, Xu Zhigao was not happy, but Song privately advised him to accept the Run command, pointing out that Run Prefecture was just across the Yangtze River from the Wu capital Guangling — easy for him to take advantage of any disturbances that might rise as a result of misdeeds by Xu Zhigao's adoptive brother Xu Zhixun, whom, as Xu Wen's oldest biological son, Xu Wen had left in charge at Guangling as junior regent. Given Song's analysis, Xu Zhigao changed his attitude and accepted the Run command gladly. When, as Song anticipated, the senior general Zhu Jin started an uprising at Guangling in 918 and killed Xu Zhixun, Xu Zhigao was able to cross the river easily and put down the disturbance quickly. With Xu Wen's other biological sons all being young, Xu Wen thus left Xu Zhigao as the junior regent at Guangling, replacing Xu Zhixun.

Xu Zhigao changed from the ways that Xu Zhixun misruled and gained the trust of the people and the officials. Song continued to serve as Xu Zhigao's chief strategist. In particular, it was said that it was Song who advocated a major reduction in the silk tax to encourage the people to produce silk, and that after Xu Zhigao adopted the suggestion, the region between the Yangtze and the Huai River became very wealthy. Xu Zhigao wanted to promote Song to higher position, but Xu Wen disliked Song and left him at a relatively low rank, as an army secretary. Nevertheless, it was said that Xu Zhigao and Song would nightly converse in private at a pavilion by the river, or in a hall with no barriers but with a great furnace, for them to use pokers to write in the ash, thus allowing them to quickly erase whatever they wrote to each other and keep their conversation secret. Still, only after Xu Wen's death in 927 was Song promoted, eventually to be the deputy minister of defense (兵部侍郎, Bingbu Shilang).

In 931, Xu Zhigao was poised to make Song chancellor. Song, however, believed that he would not be able to get people to be obedient to him given his relative lack of seniority, decided not to accept. Instead, he requested to return to Zhennan's capital Hong Prefecture (洪州) to rebury his father. Instead, on the way, he entered Mount Jiuhua and became a hermit at Yingtian Temple (應天寺) on the mountain. Despite edicts from Yang Longan's brother and successor, Yang Pu (who by that point had claimed imperial title) and letters from Xu Zhigao, he refused to exit the mountain. Xu Zhigao had to send his son Xu Jingtong to Mount Jiuhua to personally persuade Song, for Song to return to the imperial government. Still, after doing so, Song retired with the title of You Pushe (右僕射). As a result of this episode, Yingtian Temple was renamed Zhengxian Temple (徵賢寺, "temple where the able was summoned"). However, later in the year, when Xu Zhigao himself took up position at Jinling (i.e., Run Prefecture) following Xu Wen's example and left Xu JIngtong in charge at Guangling, Song agreed to return to the imperial government to serve as chancellor with the designation Tong Zhongshu Menxia Pingzhangshi (同中書門下平章事), along with Wang Lingmou, to assist Xu JIngtong.

By 933, under Song's advice, Xu Zhigao was considering moving the capital (and the emperor) from Guangling to Jinling. He was also considering seizing the Wu throne and become emperor himself, but as Yang Pu was known to be careful and without fault as an emperor, he was initially intending on waiting for the next Wu emperor to take the throne before seizing imperial title, an intent that Song agreed with. In spring 934, though, when the officer Zhou Zong observed Xu Zhigao complaining about his white facial hair, Zhou, realizing that Xu Zhigao did not want to wait any further, volunteered to go to Guangling himself to hint to Yang Pu that he should yield the throne. When Song realized what Zhou was doing, however, he became resentful that Zhou would take this initiative, and instead took the stand of opposing it, arguing that the time was not appropriate, yet. He further requested that Zhou be executed as an apology to the emperor. As a result, Xu Zhigao demoted Zhou out of the headquarters to serve as the deputy military prefect of Chi Prefecture (池州, in modern Chizhou, Anhui). Later, though, when other officers Li Jianxun and Xu Jie also suggested that Xu Zhigao quickly take the throne, Xu Zhigao summoned Zhou back to headquarters, and thereafter began to distance himself from Song. Indeed, later in the year, Xu Zhigao summoned Song back to Jinling to serve as his deputy in his position as the supreme commander of all circuits, but gave him no real responsibilities. When Song thereafter asked to retire, Xu Zhigao gave him a garden as a gift.

In 936, after Xu Zhigao assumed the greater title as generalissimo, he made Xu Jingtong deputy generalissimo, and made Song and Xu Jie deputies to Xu Jingtong. Song, however, continued to take the stand of opposing the coming imperial transition. When Xu Zhigao had the senior generals Li Decheng (Li Jianxun's father) and Zhou Ben submit petitions for such a transition, to further try to put on a display that this transition was the result of a consensus, Song commented to Li Jianxun, "Your honored father was a great contributor to Taizu [(i.e., all Wu rulers' father Yang Xingmi, whose conquests established the foundation for the Wu state)], and now his reputation is dumped on the ground." Still, around this time, Xu Zhigao did agree to a suggestion of Song's — to establish friendly relations with Khitan, to plan a possible invasion of the Central Plains (then ruled by Later Jin). Xu Zhigao thus sent beautiful women and jewels to Khitan, and Khitan's Emperor Taizong thereafter sent emissaries to Wu as well.

In late 937, Yang Pu did, under Xu Zhigao's pressure, issue an edict yielding the throne to Xu Zhigao, ending Wu. It was said that the only well-known Wu official who did not then sign a petition urging Xu Zhigao to take the throne was Song.

== During Emperor Liezu's reign ==
Xu Zhigao took the throne, establishing Southern Tang (as its Emperor Liezu). When he subsequently held a banquet for high-level officials, Li Decheng, at the banquet, stated that all who were there were happy that he accepted the throne, except for Song Qiqiu, and then gave Emperor Liezu the letter that Song wrote him, trying to stop him from urging Emperor Liezu to take the throne. Emperor Liezu refused to look at the letter, stating: "Zisong [(Song's courtesy name)] is an old friend of 30 years. He will surely not turn against me." Hearing this, Song bowed to him and thanked him.

Meanwhile, while Song carried the long-abandoned and now-reinstituted titles of Left Prime Minister (左丞相, Zuo Chengxiang) and Da Shitu (大師徒, a more magnified form of the title of Situ, one of the Three Excellencies) in the new Southern Tang administration, he was not given real responsibilities. He became so displeased that when an imperial edict was read out loud, honoring him referred to him as "Our friend from when we wore civilian clothing," he loudly replied, "When your subject was wearing civilian clothing, Your Imperial Majesty was a prefect; now that Your Imperial Majesty is the Son of Heaven, you no longer need this old subject." After making the comment, he went home and expected punishment. Emperor Liezu issued another edict thanking him but not giving him additional responsibilities. Unsure what to do to regain the emperor's trust, he submitted petitions requesting that Yang Pu (whom Emperor Liezu continued to honor as a retired emperor and allowed to live at the palace in Guangling, while Southern Tang's capital was set at Jinling (i.e., Sheng Prefecture)) be moved out of Guangling and be given a lesser title, so that people would not be tempted to rebel to restore Wu, and that the marriage between Emperor Liezu's daughter Princess Yongxing and Yang Pu's son Yang Lian the Duke of Hongnong (the former crown prince) be severed. Emperor Liezu did not accept either proposal. When Song again objected in 938 that, as Left Prime Minister, he should be allowed to participate in the governance, Emperor Liezu gave the excuse that the office building had not been built yet. Meanwhile, apparently accepting one of Song's ideas after all (and with Yang Pu himself being uncomfortable remaining at Guangling as a former emperor), Emperor Liezu moved Yang Pu and the former Wu imperial family from Guangling to Run Prefecture and put them under secure guard. Still, when Song subsequently again complained about being separated from the emperor by wicked people, Emperor Liezu became publicly angry, causing Song to again return to his home to wait for punishment. When others spoke on his behalf, Emperor Liezu commented, "Song Qiqiu is talented but does not know what is appropriate." He sent Xu Jingtong (whose name would soon thereafter be changed to Li Jing by this point and who had, as the emperor's oldest son, been created the Prince of Wu, as Emperor Liezu had himself restored his birth name of Li in order to claim legitimate succession from Tang dynasty, apparently under a suggestion initially made by Song) to Song's mansion to recall him to the government, and Song subsequently returned. Subsequently, Emperor Liezu accepted another suggestion of Song's — that when a Khitan emissary arrived, the emissary was treated with great honors, but as soon as the emissary headed north, back across the Huai River (i.e., now in Later Jin territory), assassins were sent to kill him, so that the killing could be blamed on Later Jin. It was said that this incident did bring frictions between Later Jin and Khitan (whose aid was critical in Later Jin's establishment). Meanwhile, it was also at Song's proposal (although apparently a proposal driven by Emperor Liezu himself) that when Emperor Liezu established the seven imperial ancestral temples, while most of the temples were dedicated to Emperor Liezu's biological Li ancestors, Emperor Liezu's adoptive father Xu Wen was given one of the three most honored temple positions (and given the temple name of Yizu), along with Tang's first two emperors Emperor Gaozu and Emperor Taizong.

In 942, at Song's repeated request, Emperor Liezu allowed him to join the other chancellors in governance, and further had him oversee the executive bureau of government (尚書省, Shangshu Sheng), with Emperor Liezu's son Li Jingsui the Prince of Shou shifted from his responsibility of overseeing the executive bureau to overseeing the legislative (中書省, Zhongshu Sheng) and examination (門下省, Menxia Sheng) bureaus instead, with Li Jing overseeing all three bureaus as well. However, after a few months in office, one of Song's attendants, Xia Changtu (夏昌圖) embezzled a large amount of money, but Song, ruling on the case, did not issue a death penalty for Xia. Emperor Liezu was incensed, personally ordered Xia be executed. Song thereafter claimed an illness and requested to be relieved of the responsibility of overseeing the executive bureau. Emperor Liezu agreed.

For several months, Song did not meet with the emperor. Emperor Liezu sent Li Jingsui to his mansion to comfort him and promised to make him the military governor of Zhennan, and he thereafter went to meet Emperor Liezu at a banquet. At the banquet, however, they got into an argument, with Emperor Liezu accusing Song of being ungrateful and of comparing the emperor to the vicious King Goujian of Yue, and Song admitting to making such a remark and commenting that the emperor could kill him if the emperor wanted. The next day, Emperor Liezu wrote a personal letter to Song, stating, "You, Zisong, have long known our temper. How can it be the case that when we were young we were so close to each other, but in old age we hate each other?" He subsequently made Song the military governor of Zhennan. After Song arrived at Zhennan, he built a large mansion for himself and lived luxuriously, purportedly at the people's detriment. He often ruled on matters while wearing a silk robe that Emperor Liezu gave him.

== During Emperor Yuanzong's reign ==
In 943, Emperor Liezu died, and Li Jing, as his oldest son, succeeded him as emperor (as Emperor Yuanzong). While Emperor Yuanzong had disliked Song Qiqiu because Song had often praised Li Jing's younger brother Li Jingda the Prince of Xuancheng and hinted that Li Jingda would be a more appropriate heir, Song nevertheless regained a foothold in the Southern Tang imperial government because he was in an alliance with three officials who served on Emperor Yuanzong's staff while he was an imperial prince — Chen Jue, Feng Yanji, and Wei Cen (魏岑) — whom he trusted. Further, Emperor Yuanzong had wanted to have senior officials who were well-respected by the people as his chancellors, so he recalled Song and Zhou Zong, who had also been made a military governor, to the imperial government to serve as chancellors, with Song given the titles of Taibao (太保) and Zhongshu Ling (中書令, head of the legislative bureau).

However, by later 943, Song had displeased Emperor Yuanzong by having his associates make false accusations against Zhou, whom Emperor Yuanzong respected. Further, by this point, Chen was no longer in the imperial government (having left governmental service to observe a mourning period for his mother). Emperor Yuanzong thus made Song the military governor of Zhenhai Circuit (鎮海, headquartered at Run Prefecture). In anger, Song offered to retire to Mount Jiuhua, believing that Emperor Yuanzong would try to comfort him. Instead, Emperor Yuanzong approved of the retirement petition, gave him the honorary title of Lord of Jiuhua, and created him the Duke of Qingyang (青陽, in modern Chizhou, Anhui, i.e., the county in which Mount Jiuhua lay in). Song thereafter built a large mansion at Qingyang and lived luxuriously, but continued to be bitter.

Meanwhile, Emperor Yuanzong publicly announced a succession plan (that he believed that Emperor Liezu wanted) of first passing the throne to Li Jingsui, then to Li Jingda. In 944, he further ordered that most matters should be ruled on by Li Jingsui, with Wei Cen and Cha Wenhui (查文徽), the deputy chiefs of staff, as the only officials who would be permitted to see the emperor on a regular basis. Once he issued this edict, however, there was much opposition, and Song submitted a petition from his retirement at Qingyang also urging against it, thus impressing Emperor Yuanzong. Therefore, in 945, when Li Jingda's staff member Xie Zhongxuan (謝仲宣) pointed out that the people were disappointed that someone as respected for his talent as Song was not given any power, and Li Jingda relayed this suggestion to Emperor Yuanzong, Emperor Yuanzong sent Li Jingda to Qingyang to recall Song. Once Song arrived at Jinling, Song was given the titles of Taifu (太傅) and Zhongshu Ling, thus titularly restoring him to chancellorship, but was said to be not given actual decision-making authority. Emperor Yuanzong also created him the greater title of Duke of Wei.

Around this time, Southern Tang was faced with the issue of what to do with the remnants of its southeastern neighbor Min, which Southern Tang forces had destroyed in 945 by capturing its capital Jian Prefecture (建州, in modern Nanping, Fujian), as Min's prior capital Fu Prefecture (福州, in modern Fuzhou, Fujian) remained under control of Li Hongyi, a former Min general who had nominally submitted to Southern Tang but who was controlling the Fu region as his own private domain. Song recommended Chen as an emissary to Li Hongyi, predicting that Chen would be able to persuade Li Hongyi to give up his private domain and relocate to Jinling. When Chen arrived at Fu, however, Li Hongyi made a public display of his power, and Chen never dared to bring up his proposal. Humiliated, Chen, on the way back to Jinling, decided to forge an imperial edict ordering Southern Tang forces to converge on Fu against Li Hongyi. Emperor Yuanzong, once he received the news, was incensed at Chen's falsely issuing an imperial edict, but felt compelled to back up Chen's actions with reinforcements. In spring 947, however, the Southern Tang forces were crushed by the joint forces of Li Hongyi and Southern Tang's eastern neighbor Wuyue, thus forever losing the chance of capturing Fu. In the aftermath of this military disaster, Chen and Feng, who also supported the campaign, were exiled. Song offered to be punished as well, because he had recommended Chen, but no punishment came. When the official Han Xizai repeatedly requested Chen's and Feng's death and pointed out that the faction headed by Song would eventually bring even greater disaster, Song accused Han of being an alcoholic and wild in nature, and had him demoted. Later in 947, however, Emperor Yuanzong again sent Song out of the imperial government by making him the military governor of Zhennan.

Song apparently remained at Zhennan until 951, when Emperor Yuanzong recalled him to Jinling to again serve as Taifu, and also created him the Duke of Chu and gave him the honorary title of military governor of Dongchuan Circuit (東川, headquartered in modern Mianyang, Sichuan, then ruled by Later Shu).

In 955, in the face of an impending major invasion by Later Zhou's Emperor Shizong, Emperor Yuanzong reengaged Song as a key advisor to plan the defense against Later Zhou forces. Song advocated the strategy of spreading out the Southern Tang forces near the Huai, to try to confuse the Later Zhou forces so that they would not dare to advance deeply into Southern Tang territory, and then cutting off their food supply routes, forcing them to retreat and sue for peace. Emperor Yuanzong, who was fearful of Later Zhou forces, decided to follow Song's strategy. However, Southern Tang suffered repeated defeats, and its main garrison on the Huai, Shou Prefecture (壽州, in modern Lu'an, Anhui), became desperately sieged by Later Zhou. Emperor Yuanzong sent the official Li Deming (李德明) to Emperor Shizong to sue for peace, which Emperor Shizong refused; upon observing how massive the Later Zhou forces were on this mission, however, Li Deming returned to Jinling and advocated ceding all of the Southern Tang lands north of the Yangtze to Later Zhou, which Emperor Shizong indicated that he would be satisfied with. Song spoke against the proposal heavily, however, and Chen (who had since returned to the imperial government as Emperor Yuanzong's chief of staff) and Chen's deputy Li Zhenggu (李徵古) subsequently accused Li Deming of treason. Emperor Yuanzong executed Li Deming, and that, for the time being, ended hopes of a negotiated peace between Southern Tang and Later Zhou.

In summer 956, however, with his forces bogged down and running into food supply issues, and counterattacks by the Southern Tang general Zhu Yuan successful in capturing some of the prefectures that Later Zhou had previously captured, Emperor Shizong changed his strategy of capturing as much territory as possible, and withdrew most of the Later Zhou forces, concentrating instead on capturing the besieged Shou Prefecture. As Later Zhou forces were withdrawing, many Southern Tang officials were advocating attacking them as they were retreating. Song, however, argued that doing so would create enmity between the two states, and instead advocated letting them leave without trouble. This, however, made the Shou Prefecture garrison's position even more desperate. By 957, Zhu, who had disagreements with Chen before, was convinced that Chen was going to have him killed, and therefore surrendered to Later Zhou. In the aftermath, the relief forces commanded by Li Jingda and Chen sent to try to lift the siege on Shou were crushed by Later Zhou, and Shou subsequently fell. Later Zhou forces then used the momentum to capture nearly all of Southern Tang's territory north of the Yangtze. By spring 958, Emperor Shizong himself was approaching the Yangtze, forcing Emperor Yuanzong to sue for peace — including formally submitting as a Later Zhou vassal, referring to himself as the King of Tang rather than emperor in correspondences with Later Zhou (although he still referred to himself as emperor internally), and ceding the four prefectures that Southern Tang forces still held north of the Yangtze to Later Zhou.

Emperor Yuanzong was depressed over the military disasters. Li Zhenggu suggested that he go into seclusion and entrust the state to Song. Li Deming's friend Zhong Mo (鍾謨), who wanted to avenge Li Deming, used this opportunity to accuse Song, Li Zhenggu, and Chen of collaborating to have Song usurp the throne. Further, at this time, Chen had also forged an order from Emperor Shizong (now formally Emperor Yuanzong's sovereign) that the Southern Tang chancellor Yan Xu be put to death. These events convinced Emperor Yuanzong that the Song faction was up to no good. In winter 958, Emperor Yuanzong thus acted, exiling Chen, executing Li Zhenggu, and ordering Song back into retirement at Mount Jiuhua, albeit with his titles still intact. After Song reached Mount Jiuhua in spring 959, Emperor Yuanzong had his mansion securely guarded, only allowing food to be passed through a hole in the wall. Song lamented and believed that this was divine retribution for his suggestion to have Yang Pu's family put under secure guard, and thereafter hanged himself. Emperor Yuanzong gave him the unflattering posthumous name of Chouliao (醜繆, "power-abusing and overvalued").

== Notes and references ==
- Spring and Autumn Annals of the Ten Kingdoms (十國春秋), vol. 20.
- Zizhi Tongjian, vols. 268, 269, 270, 277, 278, 279, 280, 281, 282, 283, 285, 286, 287, 290, 292, 293, 294.
