= Chi Prefecture =

Historical administrative division in Anhui, China

- Simplified Chinese: 池州
- Hanyu Pinyin: Chí Zhōu
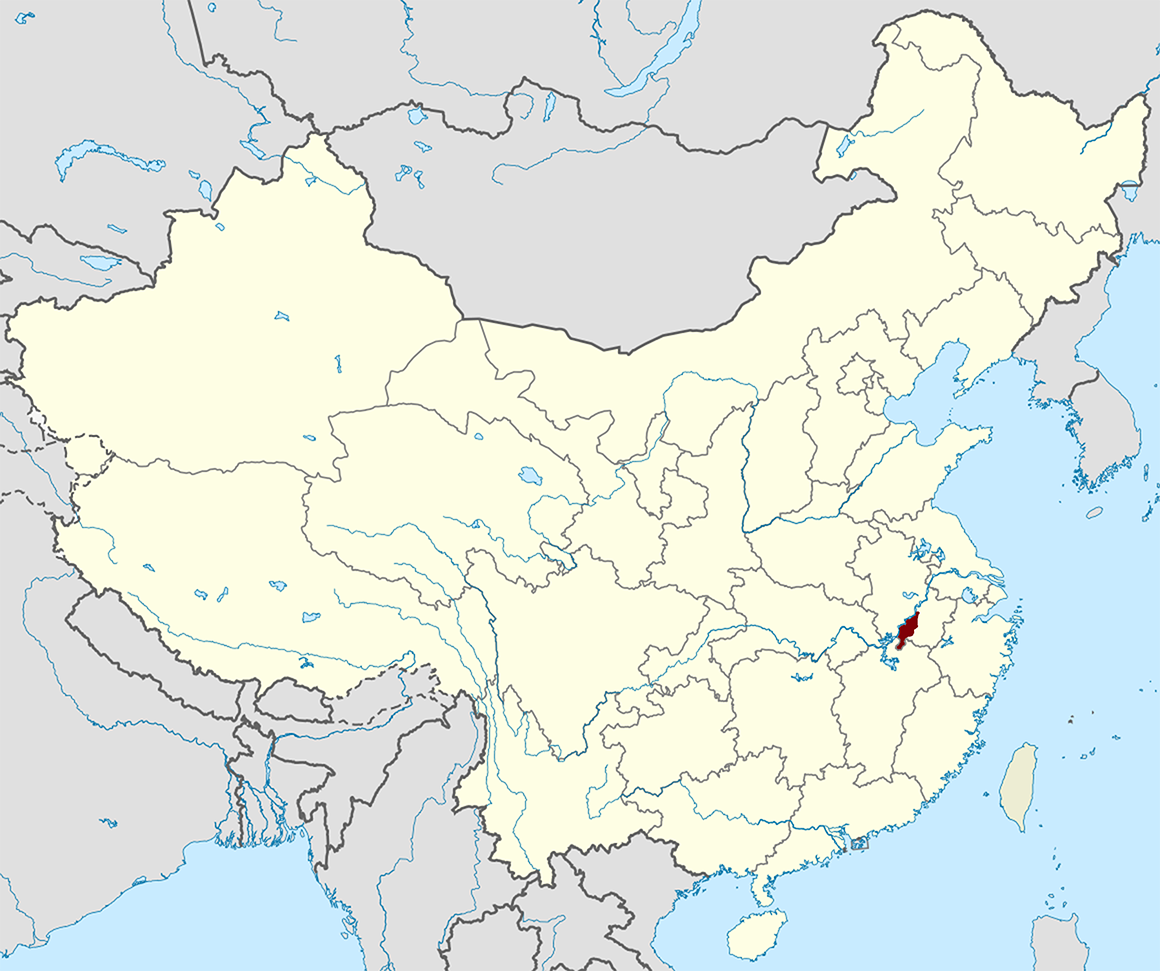
- Population
  - 1100s: 206,932
- History
  - Created: 621 (Tang dynasty); 765 (Tang dynasty)
  - Abolished: 1277 (Yuan dynasty)
  - Succeeded by: Chizhou Circuit
- Contained within
  - Circuit: Jiangnan Circuit; Jiangnan East Circuit

Chizhou or Chi Prefecture was a zhou (prefecture) in imperial China, centering on modern Chizhou, Anhui, China. It existed (intermittently) from 621 until 1277.

The modern prefectural-level city Chizhou, created in 2000, retains its name.

== Counties ==
Chi Prefecture administered the following counties (縣) through history:

#	Tang dynasty	Wu	Southern Tang	Song dynasty	Modern location
1	Qiupu (秋浦)	Guichi (貴池)			Guichi District, Chizhou
2	Qingyang (青陽)		administered by Sheng Prefecture	Qingyang	Qingyang County
3	Zhide (至德)	Jiande (建德)			Dongzhi County
4	Shidai (石埭)				Shitai County
