= Li Jingsui =

Crown Prince (Imperial Brother) of Southern Tang
- Reign: 947–958
- Born: 920
- Died: 17 September 958 (aged 38)
Posthumous name
- Crown Prince (Imperial Brother) Wencheng 文成太弟
- Father: Li Bian
- Mother: Song Fujin

Li Jingsui (Chinese: 李景遂; 920 – 17 September 958), né Xu Jingsui (徐景遂), courtesy name Tuishen (退身), formally Crown Prince Wencheng (文成太弟), was an imperial prince of the Chinese Five Dynasties and Ten Kingdoms period state Southern Tang. He was a son of Southern Tang's founding emperor Li Bian (Emperor Liezu). During the reign of his brother Li Jing (Emperor Yuanzong), he was initially designated the heir, but, having never embraced that role, repeatedly offered to yield the position to Li Jing's son Li Hongji. Eventually, Li Jing agreed, but Li Hongji, still fearing that Li Jing would change his mind again, had Li Jingsui poisoned to death.

== During Wu ==
Xu Jingsui was born in 920, during the reign of Yang Longyan the King of Wu. His father, then known as Xu Zhigao, was serving as Wu's junior regent at the Wu capital Guangling (廣陵, in modern Yangzhou, Jiangsu), with his adoptive father (Xu Jingsui's adoptive grandfather) Xu Wen the regent taking up position at Jinling and in actual control of the Wu state. His mother was Xu Zhigao's second wife Lady Song Fujin, who was also the mother of his older brothers Xu Jingtong and Xu Jingqian and younger brother Xu Jingda. Xu Jingsui was the third son overall.

By 936, Wu's titular ruler was Yang Longyan's younger brother Yang Pu, who had taken imperial title by that point; Xu Jingsui's father Xu Zhigao was the regent, stationed at Jinling, with Xu Jingtong also there serving as his deputy. The role that Xu Zhigao formerly had during Xu Wen's regency, as junior regent at the Wu capital Guangling, was held by Xu Jingqian, who was Xu Zhigao's favorite son. However, in 936, Xu Jingqian fell ill, and was removed from the junior regency and recalled to Jinling in hopes of recuperation. Xu Jingsui, then 16, was sent to Guangling to serve as junior regent, carrying the titles of Menxia Shilang (門下侍郎) and Can Zhengshi (參政事), as a de facto chancellor. (Xu Jingqian would not recover, however, and would die in 937.)

== During Southern Tang ==
=== During Li Bian's reign ===
In 937, Yang Pu yielded the throne to Xu Zhigao, ending Wu. Xu Zhigao took the throne as emperor of a new state of Southern Tang. He created Xu Jingsui, who had arrived at Jinling as part of the procession of Wu officials offering the throne to him on Yang's behalf, the Prince of Ji. He also commissioned Xu Jingsui the titles of Shizhong (侍中), defender of the eastern capital (as Jinling became the Southern Tang capital, with Guangling becoming the eastern capital with the name of Jiangdu (江都)), and mayor of Jiangdu. He had Xu Jingsui lead the officials who were assigned offices in Jiangdu back to Jiangdu. In 938, Xu Zhigao recalled Xu Jingsui to Jinling, to participate in the matters of the office of chancellors, overseeing the executive bureau of government (尚書省, Shangshu Sheng). When Yang died later in 938, it was Xu Jingsui that Xu Zhigao sent to attend to the funeral train. Xu Jingsui was overcome with grief, and those who saw him were touched.

In 939, Xu Zhigao changed his surname back to his birth name of Li, and took a new name of Li Bian. His children also changed their names to Li, and Xu Jingsui thus took the name of Li Jingsui. Not long after, Li Jingsui's title was changed to Prince of Shou. In 942, when the senior statesman Song Qiqiu insisted on taking over the executive bureau, Li Bian had Li Jingsui yield the oversight of the executive bureau to him, and instead had Li Jingsui oversee the legislative (中書省, Zhongshu Sheng) and examination (門下省, Menxia Sheng) bureaus instead, but also having Li Jingsui's older brother Li Jingtong (whose name had been changed to Li Jing by this point) oversee all three bureaus. Shortly after, Song's close associate Xia Changtu (夏昌圖) was involved in a corruption scandal, but Song initially did sentence him to death. Li Bian, in anger, personally ordered Xia's death. Song thus resigned his oversight over the executive bureau and was no longer meeting the emperor. Li Bian had to send Li Jingsui to his mansion to comfort him and promise to make him the military governor of Zhennan Circuit (鎮南, headquartered in modern Nanchang, Jiangxi) in order for him to come to the palace, upon which Song was given the Zhennan command.

=== During Li Jing's reign ===
Li Bian died in 943. Li Jing, as the oldest son, was expected to be the heir, and while he initially offered the throne to Li Jingsui instead, Li Jingsui earnestly declined, and Li Jing thereafter took the throne. He created Li Jingsui the greater title of Prince of Yan. Shortly after, Li Jing, believing that it was Li Bian's will that he pass the throne in succession to Li Jingsui and Li Jingda, created Li Jingsui (who then was also carrying the titles of Zhongshu Ling (中書令), mayor of Jinling, and military governor of Tianxiong Circuit (天雄, headquartered in modern Handan, Hebei) — a completely honorary title as Tianxiong was under the rule of Southern Tang's northern neighbor Later Jin) the Prince of Qi — a title that Li Bian and Li Jing successively carried before they became emperor. He also had Li Jingsui take up residence at the eastern palace — traditionally, the residence for the Crown Prince — thereby effectively designating him as heir. He also publicly declared his intention to pass the throne to Li Jingsui and Li Jingda (who took over the title of Prince of Yan). Both Li Jingsui and Li Jingda repeatedly declined their new titles, but were not allowed to. However, Li Jingsui still had no desire to be heir, and decided to take, as his courtesy name, Tuishen — from the Tao Te Ching passage "withdraw your body after you complete your accomplishment" (功成名遂身退, gongchengming suishentui) — to show his lack of desire to be heir. (Li Jing's close associate Feng Yanji wanted to use this opportunity to block off the other officials' access to Li Jing, and therefore persuaded Li Jing to issue an edict that the officials could only meet with and report to Li Jingsui; however, when the senior imperial guard officer Jia Chong (賈崇), weeping, pointed out that this meant that Li Jing would not be able to see what was actually occurring in the imperial administration (which was what Feng wanted) and that, if the edict took effect, Jia himself would never be able to see the emperor again, Li Jing withdrew the edict.)

In 947, Li Jing formally created Li Jingsui Crown Prince. (Li Jingda received the title of Prince of Qi, and Li Jing's oldest son Li Hongji, previously the Prince of Nanchang, became the Prince of Yan.) There was an occasion when Li Jingsui was meeting with his staff, but was paying attention to jade while staff member Zhang Yi (張易) wanted to discuss his (Li Jingsui's) behavior. Zhang, in anger, grabbed a jade cup that Li Jingsui was holding and threw it on the ground, breaking it and shocking the entire staff. Instead of becoming angry, Li Jingsui apologized, and thereafter treated Zhang better. On a subsequent occasion, when Li Jing wanted to send Zhang on an embassy, over the sea, to Liao, Li Jingsui personally wrote a petition to Li Jing urging against it, stating, "Zhang Yi is man who can support the state. He should be kept around to offer advice day and night. He should not be sent over the unpredictable sea." Li Jing, however, responded, "Zhang Yi is an unusual man, such that even the god of the sea would fear him." He sent Zhang on the embassy anyway.

By 958, Southern Tang had lost a war against Later Zhou (the successor state to Later Han, which had succeeded Later Jin), and had been forced to cede its territory north of the Yangtze River to Later Zhou, as well as formally submit as a subject). Li Jingsui used this opportunity to submit, 10 times, petitions offering to yield his crown prince position, particularly citing his own lack of contributions to the military effort and Li Hongji's contributions in repelling the attack of Later Zhou's vassal state Wuyue during the war. Li Jing accepted his petition and created Li Hongji Crown Prince to succeed him. Li Jingsui was created the Prince of Jin, and was given the additional titles of Tiance Shangjiangjun (天策上將軍), generalissimo of Jiangnan West Circuit (i.e., Zhennan, but Li Jing intentionally using the more archaic Tang title for it for impressive effect), grand commandant of Zhennan's capital Hong Prefecture (洪州), Taiwei (太尉), and Shangshu Ling (尚書令).

Upon Li Jingsui's arrival at Zhennan, he, citing the fact that, given the recent losses to Later Zhou, Zhennan was now potentially exposed to war as well, requested an official as his deputy. Li Jing thus sent Li Zhenggu (李徵古) to Zhennan to serve as his deputy military governor. However, Li Zhenggu was arrogant and dominant, such that even though Li Jingsui was himself magnanimous and relaxed, he became unable to bear Li Zhenggu as time went by. He considered killing Li Zhenggu and then report to Li Jing to confess, but was urged not to by his close associates. He became unhappy, however.

Meanwhile, Li Hongji, as crown prince, had sometimes carried out unlawful deeds. Li Jing, angry, had once caned Li Hongji, and, as he did, stated, "I will summon Jingsui back!" There also happened be a time when false accusations were laid against the son of Li Jingsui's staff member Yuan Congfan (袁從範), such that Li Jingsui was considering executing Yuan's son. When Li Hongji heard of this, he secretly sent Yuan poison to encourage Yuan to poison Li Jingsui. On a day after Li Jingsui returned to his mansion after playing polo and was thirsty, Yuan gave him milk laced with poison. Li Jingsui drank it and died. Li Jing was greatly saddened. His servants, wanting to lessen his sadness, falsely stated to him that when Li Jingsui fell ill, he stated, "Shangdi is having me replace Xu Jingyang (i.e., the Taoist deity Xu Xun)." Li Jing believed them, and did not look into the matter further. He posthumously honored Li Jingsui as a crown prince.

== Notes and references ==
- Spring and Autumn Annals of the Ten Kingdoms, vol. 19.
- Zizhi Tongjian, vols. 280, 281, 282, 283, 286, 294.
