= Tang Prefecture (Henan) =

Historical administrative division in Henan, China

Tangzhou or Tang Prefecture (唐州), briefly known as Bizhou or Bi Prefecture (泌州) from 906 to the late 940s, was a zhou (prefecture) in imperial China seated in modern Tanghe County in Henan, China. It existed (intermittently) from 626 to 1380.

== Geography ==
The administrative region of Tangzhou in the Tang dynasty is in southern Henan. It probably includes parts of modern:

- Under the administration of Nanyang:
  - Tanghe County
  - Tongbai County
  - Sheqi County
  - Fangcheng County
- Under the administration of Zhumadian:
  - Biyang County

== See also ==
- Huai'an Commandery
