= Lady Peng (Ma Xifan's wife) =

Lady Peng (彭夫人, personal name unknown) (died 938), formally Lady Shunxian of Qin (秦國順賢夫人, "the serene and wise lady"), was the wife of Ma Xifan, the third ruler of the Chinese Five Dynasties and Ten Kingdoms period state Chu.

== Background ==
It is not known when Lady Peng was born. Her father Peng Gan (彭玕) had served as the prefect of Ji Prefecture (吉州, in modern Ji'an, Jiangxi), late in the Tang dynasty and early in the Five Dynasties and Ten Kingdoms period, under the warlord Wei Quanfeng, who then controlled four prefectures, including Ji, centered on Fu Prefecture (撫州, in modern Fuzhou, Jiangxi). In 909, when Wei was defeated and captured by the Wu general Zhou Ben, Zhou then followed up by attacking Ji. Peng Gan abandoned Ji and fled to Chu. Chu's prince Ma Yin, appreciating Peng for his faithfulness to Wei, made him the prefect of Chen Prefecture (郴州, in modern Chenzhou, Hunan). Either that year or later, he had his son Ma Xifan marry Lady Peng. (As Ma Xifan would have been just 10 years old in 909, the marriage likely came later.) (It is not known whether Ma Xifan's only known son—whose name was lost to history—was born of her or not.)

== During Ma Xifan's reign ==
In 932, Ma Xifan's older brother Ma Xisheng, who was then the ruler of Chu, died. The Chu generals supported Ma Xifan as his successor. Lady Peng, as his wife, became the lady of the state, and was eventually created by Li Siyuan, the emperor of Later Tang (to whom Ma Xifan was formally a vassal), to be the Lady of Qin. It was said that Lady Peng was ugly in appearance, but capable in governing the household, and Ma Xifan was fearful and respectful of her. She died in 938. It was said that it was after her death that Ma became to overexert in entertainment and licentiousness, spending much of his nights drinking, leading to the beginning of Chu's decline.

== Notes and references ==
- Spring and Autumn Annals of the Ten Kingdoms, vol. 71.
- Zizhi Tongjian, vols. 267, 281.

Chinese nobility
Preceded by Lady Yang	Consort to the Ruler of Chu; 932-938	Succeeded by Ma Xiguang's wife
