= Lady Yang (Ma Xisheng's wife) =

Lady Yang (楊夫人, personal name unknown) (disappeared 950) was the wife of Ma Xisheng, the second ruler of the Chinese Five Dynasties and Ten Kingdoms state Chu.

== Background ==
Lady Yang was from Chu's capital Changsha, but it is not known when she was born. During the reign of Ma Xisheng's father, Chu's founding ruler Ma Yin, her father Yang Shi (楊諡) served as the commander of the army of Chu's main circuit, Wu'an Circuit (武安, headquartered at Changsha). She was Yang Shi's middle daughter.

It is not known when Lady Yang married Ma Xisheng; however, it would have been, at the latest, 929, late in Ma Yin's reign, for that year, it was said that it was her family member Yang Zhaosui (楊昭遂), who was then serving as the commander of the Wu'an army (the title that her father Yang Shi had previously held) and who wanted to displace the position of Chu's chief strategist Gao Yu, who repeatedly made accusations against Gao to Ma Xisheng, to whom Ma Yin had transferred the reins of state by that point. This led to Ma Xisheng's persuading Ma Yin to relieve Gao of his military command, and subsequently Ma Xisheng's killing of Gao.

== During and after Ma Xisheng's reign ==
Ma Yin died in 930, and Ma Xisheng succeeded him as Chu's ruler. It is not clear what kind of title Lady Yang might have carried during Ma Xisheng's rule, for he himself, at the directions left by his father, did not claim any princely titles. However, it was known that because of her, her brother Yang Zhaohui (楊昭暉) was made the prefect of Heng Prefecture (衡州, in modern Hengyang, Hunan). He gathered much wealth, built a large mansion, and had two of his sons made officers of the headquarters guard corps. It was said that because he became rich and powerful in his youth, he was arrogant and found ways to use his power to bully people, leading to the intelligentsia of the state all despising him.

Ma Xisheng died in 932 and was succeeded by his brother Ma Xifan. It appeared (based the later description of her family's fate) that Lady Yang returned to her family.

By 950, Chu was embroiled in a civil war, between then-ruler Ma Xiguang and Ma Xi'e the military governor of Wuping Circuit (武平, headquartered in modern Changde, Hunan) — both of them Ma Yin's sons and Ma Xisheng's younger brothers. In 950, after Ma Xi'e was able to persuade Ma Xiguang's general Xu Keqiong into defecting and surrendering Changsha to him, Changsha fell, leading to a general pillaging of the capital city. The officer Lu Mengjun (陸孟俊), who had long despised the Yangs, used this opportunity to attack the Yangs' mansion and slaughter them. However, it was said that Lady Yang's fate, after the slaughter, was unknown.

Chinese nobility
Preceded by ?	Consort to the Ruler of Chu; 930-932	Succeeded by Lady Peng

== Notes and references ==
- Spring and Autumn Annals of the Ten Kingdoms, vol. 71.
