= Ma Xiguang's wife =

Ma Xiguang's wife (name unknown) was the consort of Ma Xiguang, the fourth ruler of the Ma Chu dynasty of China.

Little is known about her historically — not even her name. She became Ma Chu's princess after Ma Xiguang assumed the title of prince after the death of the latter's older brother Ma Xifan in 947. Another older brother of Ma Xiguang's, Ma Xi'e, objected and attacked Chu's capital Changsha in 950, and the city fell in early 951. She, Ma Xiguang, and one or more sons hid at Ci Hall (慈堂), but were eventually discovered. She was caned to death publicly, and the people of the state mourned her greatly.

== Notes and references ==
Chinese nobility
Preceded by Lady Peng	Consort to the Ruler of Chu; 947-951	Succeeded by None as wife of ruler of Chu, Lady Yan as wife of ruler of the region
