= Empress Rang =

Empress Rang may refer to:

- Empress Ma (Jianwen)
- Empress Wang (Yang Pu)
