= Li Jianxun =

Official of the Chinese Five Dynasties and Ten Kingdoms period

Li Jianxun (Chinese: 李建勳; died 952), courtesy name Zhiyao (致堯), known late in life as the Duke of Zhongshan (鍾山公), was an official of the Chinese Five Dynasties and Ten Kingdoms Period state Wu and its successor state Southern Tang, serving as a chancellor during Southern Tang and possibly during Wu.

== Background ==
It is not known what year Li Jianxun was born — although subsequent events of his life would tend to place a framework on the possible time of his birth. He was the fourth son of Li Decheng, who served as a general under the major late-Tang warlord Yang Xingmi the military governor of Huainan Circuit (淮南, headquartered in modern Yangzhou, Jiangsu). He was studious in his youth and capable in writing, particularly in poetry.

== During Hongnong/Wu ==
After Tang fell in 907, Yang Xingmi's domain, then ruled by his son and successor Yang Wo, became the state of Hongnong (later known as Wu). In 908, his officers Zhang Hao and Xu Wen assassinated him, and shortly after, Xu killed Zhang and supported Yang Wo's younger brother Yang Longyan to succeed Yang Wo as the Prince of Hongnong. Xu thereafter took effective reins of the state as its regent. At this time, Li Jianxun's father Li Decheng was serving as the prefect of Run Prefecture (潤州, in modern Zhenjiang, Jiangsu), and had a habit of going out of the city at night. This drew Xu's suspicion, concerned that Li Decheng might be planning to act against him, so he transferred Li Decheng to Jiang Prefecture (江州, in modern Jiujiang, Jiangxi), farther from the Hongnong capital Guangling. Realizing that Xu suspected him, Li Decheng tried to alleviate Xu's concerns by sending Li Jianxun to pay homage to Xu. When Xu met Li Jianxun, he was impressed and stated, "If he had a son like this, he cannot be an evil man." He then gave a daughter to Li Jianxun in marriage. Despite Li Jianxun's being honored based on his father's and his father-in-law's statuses, he himself was said to be careful and (at that time) not involved in politics, although he often met with the poorer members of the intelligentsia.

Li Jianxun later became a surveyor at Sheng Prefecture (昇州, in modern Nanjing, Jiangsu), where his father-in-law Xu Wen had his headquarters. After Xu's death in 927, he continued to serve under Xu's biological son Xu Zhixun, who took over the Jinling (i.e., Sheng) headquarters as well as the army stationed there, as Xu Zhixun succeeded to Xu Wen's titles of military governor (Jiedushi) of Zhenhai (鎮海, headquartered at Run Prefecture) and Ningguo (寧國, headquartered in modern Xuancheng, Anhui) Circuits. A struggle for the control of the state (known as Wu by that point and whose emperor was Yang Longyan's brother and successor Yang Pu) thereafter developed between Xu Wen's adoptive, but older, son Xu Zhigao, whom Xu Wen had assigned as junior regent at Guangling and controlled the Wu imperial government, and Xu Zhixun, who controlled the largest army in the Wu realm. In 929, Xu Zhigao tricked Xu Zhixun into coming to Guangling, and then forced him to remain at Guangling, sending other generals to take over the army and bringing it back to Guangling. Most of Xu Zhixun's staff members were demoted, but Li escaped this fate (perhaps because, as the later statement by Li's wife suggested, he was in communications with Xu Zhigao).

In 931, Xu Zhigao himself, following Xu Wen's precedent, went to Jinling to take up position there as the military governor of Zhenhai and Ningguo, leaving his son Xu Jingtong in control of the Wu government at Guangling as junior regent. Li served as Xu's deputy military governor. By 934, when Xu Zhigao was beginning to consider taking over the throne, Li and Xu Jie were in favor, and participated in the planning. By late 936, when the plans for such a transition were deep in motion, Xu Zhigao had Li Jianxun's father Li Decheng and Zhou Ben, the two most senior generals of the realm, go to Guangling to petition Yang Pu to pass the throne to Xu Zhigao, and then come to Jinling to petition him to accept. This led Xu's advisor Song Qiqiu, who opposed the transition, to state to Li Jianxun, "Your honored father was a great contributor to Emperor Taizu [(i.e., Yang Xingmi)], but now his accomplishments are destroyed." (By this time, Li Jianxun carried the title of Zhongshu Shilang (中書侍郎, deputy head of the legislative bureau of government (中書省, Zhongshu Sheng)), which was a post generally designated for a chancellor, although it is not completely clear whether he was in fact a chancellor, as the traditional accounts did not indicate whether he also carried the title of Tong Zhongshu Menxia Pingzhangshi (同中書門下平章事), usually a prerequisite title for a chancellor.) Xu thereafter accepted the throne, ending Wu and starting Southern Tang.

== During Southern Tang ==
=== During Li Bian's reign ===
After the establishment of the Southern Tang state, Li Jianxun continued to serve as Zhongshu Shilang, and by this point was clearly a chancellor, as he was given the title of Tong Zhongshu Menxia Pingzhangshi, along with Zhang Yanhan and Zhang Juyong. He was also given the title of Zuo Pushe (左僕射, one of the heads of the executive bureau (尚書省, Shangshu Sheng)), put in charge of editing the imperial history, and given the military governorship of Yicheng Circuit (義成, headquartered in modern Anyang, Henan, a completely honorary title as Yicheng was then the territory of Southern Tang's northern neighbor Later Jin). In 938, Xu Zhigao sent him to escort Yang Pu and Yang Pu's family from the palace at Guangling to Run Prefecture, whose inner city was converted into Danyang Palace, to house the Yang family. In 939, Xu Zhigao changed his family name back to his birth name of Li, and took on a personal name of Bian, and declared a mourning period for his birth parents. Even though she was Xu Wen's biological daughter, Li Jianxun's wife, who by this point was carrying the title of Grand Princess Guangde, joined in the mourning.

As Li Bian took the throne based on his service as a Wu official, he was apprehensive of giving his own officials too much power. Chancellors thus did not remain in their positions for long, but Li Jianxun was an exception. Still, by 941, Li Bian was apprehensive of having Li Jianxun remaining as chancellor, but Li Jianxun was showing no signs that he would ask to leave the position. According to the Spring and Autumn Annals of the Ten Kingdoms, at that time, there happened to be another official who made a proposal in governance, and, in the proposal, stated, "This is such an important matter that you should not let one of your subjects issue the order. You should issue the order yourself." While Li Bian had agreed to this proposal, he had not yet actually acted on it. Li Jianxun, however, knowing that Li Bian had agreed, ordered one of the designated imperial edict drafters to begin drafting the edict. The imperial attendant Chang Mengxi (常夢錫) thereafter submitted an accusation against Li Jianxun for wrongly drafting an edict. As Li Bian was looking for an excuse to relieve Li Jianxun from his chancellorship, he did so. However, the Grand Princess Guangde went to see Li Bian, and, in a pointed tone, stated, "When my father was ill, you, older brother, also often requested to see his instructions to Master Li [(i.e., Li Jianxun)]. Now why do you turn against him?" Li Bian responded, "This is a matter of the state. Master Li and I are flesh and blood, and I have no suspicions of him." Li Bian summoned Li Jianxun and comforted him, and soon returned him to chancellorship. (However, the Zizhi Tongjian gave a different version of the events, stating that what happened was that it was Li Jianxun who made the proposal, and was expecting that Li Bian would examine the proposal for some time before ruling on it. However, Li Bian went ahead and approved the proposal and prepared to promulgate it. Li Jianxun, realizing that there were aspects of the proposal that would be viewed as benefitting himself and therefore he would be viewed in a negative light, modified the proposal without resubmitting it to the emperor, and therefore was removed.)

Late in his reign, Li Bian often took medication made by the alchemist Shi Shouchong (史守沖), which he believed to be able to enhance health, but which in actuality changed his disposition such that he became harsher and less patient. At one point, he gave some of the medication to Li Jianxun as a gift. Li Jianxun later stated to him, "I, your subject, took it for several days, and I felt overactive and having hot flashes. How could it be that it could be taken more than that?" Li Bian responded, "I have been taking it for a long time," and did not heed Li Jianxun's warnings. The medication ended up damaging Li Bian's health and, in 943, he died, and was succeeded by Xu Jingtong, whose name had been changed to Li Jing.

=== During Li Jing's reign ===
After Li Jing took the throne, others asked Li Jianxun of his impression of the new emperor. Li Jianxun commented, "The Master is kind and tolerant, and in that aspect is superior to the Deceased Emperor [(i.e., Li Bian)]. However, his habits are unset, and the people close to him are not righteous men. I fear that he cannot protect the foundation the Deceased Emperor left him." Li Jing honored Li Jianxun as greatly as he did Song Qiqiu, and often referred to him as just "the Historian" rather than by name, to show respect.

In 943, Li Jianxun was sent out of the capital Jinling to serve as military governor of Zhaowu Circuit (昭武, headquartered in modern Fuzhou, Jiangxi). When Southern Tang captured Jian Prefecture (建州, in modern Nanping, Fujian), the capital of its southeastern neighbor Min and thus ending Min, in 945, Li Jianxun, distressed at the poor discipline that the Southern Tang army displayed at Jian, including capturing the people of Jian to serve as servants, asked that the imperial government use its own stores of gold and silk to ransom the captured people of Jian to set them free, and Li Jing agreed. In 946, Li Jing recalled him to the imperial government to serve as You Pushe and Menxia Shilang (門下侍郎, deputy head of the examination bureau (門下省; ménxià shěng), as well as chancellor, along with Feng Yanji. It was said that this time around as chancellor, Li Jianxun, while experienced in administrative matters, was indecisive, allowing Feng, who was considered wicked, to make most of the decisions.

At a subsequent point (before 951), Li Jianxun built a lodge at Mount Zhong, and requested retirement there. Li Jing granted him leave to retire with the honorary title of Situ (司徒), and gave him the title of Duke of Zhongshan — although it is unclear whether this was just an appellation or an actual creation of a noble title. His wife, the Grand Princess, also took to referring herself as "the Old Woman of Zhongshan." Someone questioned him as to why he was retiring even though he was not yet old, asking him whether he was trying to follow the example of "the Lord of Jiuhua" (i.e., Song Qiqiu, referring to an infamous incident in 943, when Song, in a fit of anger, offered to retire to Jiuhua, believing that Li Jing would keep him at the imperial government, but Li Jing did not do so, although Song would in fact later return to the imperial government). Li Jianxun laughed and responded, "I had, throughout my life, laughed at Lord Song for returning to duty so easily, so why should I not follow him in retiring? I know that I will not have a long life, and so I want a few years of peace."

In 951, while in retirement, Li Jianxun attended a celebration where the imperial officials congratulated Li Jing on Southern Tang's recent conquest of its southwestern neighbor Chu. Most of the officials were in a festive mood, but Li Jianxun believed that this was the start of a disaster. (Indeed, the next year, 952, an uprising by former Chu officers, led by Liu Yan, expelled the Southern Tang forces from the former Chu territory, leaving Southern Tang with no gain.)

Li Jianxun died in 952 and was given posthumous honors. It was said that later, after Southern Tang was destroyed, the tombs of the prominent officials were largely all robbed for treasure. However, no one at that time knew where Li Jianxun's tomb was, and so it escaped such a fate. It was said that Song, proud of his abilities, rarely praised colleagues, but he praised Li for Li's ability to speak well.

== Notes and references ==
- Spring and Autumn Annals of the Ten Kingdoms, vol. 21.
- Zizhi Tongjian, vols. 279, 280, 281, 282, 283, 285, 290.
