= Ma Yin =

Ruler of Ma Chu from 907 to 930

King Wumu of Chu 楚武穆王
- King of Chu

Ruler of Ma Chu
- Reign: June 8, 907 or 927 – December 2, 930
- Successor: Ma Xisheng (Prince of Hengyang)

Jiedushi of Wu'an Circuit (武安軍節度使)
- Tenure: 896 – 930
- Predecessor: Liu Jianfeng
- Successor: Ma Xisheng
- Born: 852
- Died: December 2, 930
Names
- Mǎ Yīn (馬殷)
Era name and dates
- Tiancheng (天成) (Adopted the era name of Later Tang): 927–930
Posthumous name
- King Wǔmù (武穆王, "martial and solemn")
- House: Ma
- Dynasty: Ma Chu

Ma Yin (traditional Chinese: 馬殷; simplified Chinese: 马殷; pinyin: Mǎ Yīn; c. 853 – December 2, 930), courtesy name Batu (霸圖), also known by his posthumous name as the King Wumu of Chu (楚武穆王), was a Chinese military general and politician who became the founding ruler of the Chinese Ma Chu dynasty during the Five Dynasties and Ten Kingdoms period. He was the only monarch who carried the title of "king" in his dynasty. He initially took control of the Changsha region in 896 after the death of his predecessor Liu Jianfeng, and subsequently increased his territorial hold to roughly modern Hunan and northeastern Guangxi, which became the territory of Ma Chu.

== Background and early career ==
Ma Yin was born in 853, during the reign of Emperor Xuānzong. He was known to be from Yanling (鄢陵, in modern Xuchang, Henan), but all that is known about his ancestors is that his great-grandfather was named Ma Yun (馬筠), his grandfather was named Ma Zheng (馬正), and his father was named Ma Yuanfeng (馬元豐). His family claimed ancestry from the great Han dynasty general Ma Yuan. Ma Yin was a carpenter in his youth. He had at least two younger brothers, Ma Cong (馬賨) and Ma Cun (馬存).

At one point, when Zhongwu Circuit (忠武, headquartered in modern Xuchang) stationed an army at Cai Prefecture (蔡州, in modern Zhumadian, Henan) to defend against the major agrarian rebel Huang Chao, Ma Yin served in the Zhongwu army stationed at Cai, under the officers Sun Ru and Liu Jianfeng. By that time, Ma had become known for his abilities and bravery. Later, when Qin Zongquan the military governor of Fengguo Circuit (奉國, headquartered at Cai Prefecture) rebelled against the rule of Emperor Xuānzong's grandson Emperor Xizong, Sun and Liu, as well as their army, came under Qin's rule.

=== Service under Sun Ru ===
In 887, Qin Zongquan sent his brother Qin Zongheng (秦宗衡), with Sun as his deputy, to advance into Huainan Circuit (淮南, headquartered in modern Yangzhou, Jiangsu), to contend for control of the circuit, which by that point had fallen into an internecine struggle between Qin Yan and Bi Shiduo on one side, and Yang Xingmi on the other. Liu and Ma were both in this army commanded by Qin Zongheng. When they arrived at Huainan's capital Yang Prefecture (揚州), Yang Xingmi had captured it and forced Qin Yan and Bi to flee. Qin Yan and Bi then joined forces with Qin Zongheng as well. Soon thereafter, when Qin Zongquan, himself facing military pressure from Zhu Quanzhong the military governor of Xuanwu Circuit (宣武, headquartered in modern Kaifeng, Henan), tried to recall Qin Zongheng's army, Sun assassinated Qin Zongheng and took over the army, thereafter executing Qin Yan and Bi. Sun soon defeated Yang Xingmi and took over Yang Prefecture, claiming the title of military governor of Huainan. (Yang subsequently took Ningguo Circuit (寧國, headquartered in modern Xuanzhou, Anhui and became its military governor.)

In spring 891, Sun launched the initial phase of an ambitious plan to first destroy Yang Xingmi and then Zhu. He took all of the army available to him and headed for Xuanshe's capital Xuan Prefecture (宣州). Liu was part of Sun's army. Sun's army was initially victorious, and by spring 892 had put Xuan Prefecture under siege. However, Sun was unable to capture Xuan, and soon got bogged down, with Yang sending raiders to cut off his food supplies. Further, his army was soon troubled by torrential floods and illnesses, and Sun himself was suffering from malaria. He was forced to send Liu and Ma out to raid the nearby regions for food. Meanwhile, Yang, hearing that Sun was suffering from malaria, attacked. He crushed Sun's army and killed Sun. Most of Sun's soldiers surrendered to Yang. Liu and Ma took 7,000 soldiers and headed south, toward Zhennan Circuit (鎮南, headquartered in modern Nanchang, Jiangsi); the soldiers supported Liu as their leader, with Ma as his forward commander and Zhang Ji (張佶) as his strategist. The army's size eventually ballooned to over 100,000.

=== Service under Liu Jianfeng ===
Instead of attacking Zhennan Circuit, Liu's army continued to head southwest, toward Wu'an Circuit, which was then ruled by Deng Chuna. When Liu reached Liling (醴陵, in modern Zhuzhou, Hunan) in summer 894, Deng sent his subordinates Jiang Xun (蔣勛) and Deng Jichong (鄧繼崇) to defend Longhui Pass (龍回關, in modern Shaoyang, Hunan) against Liu's advance. Ma Yin advanced to the pass and sent a messenger to Jiang and Deng Jichong. The messenger persuaded Jiang and Deng Jichong that Liu's arrival was foretold by the stars and that their army would be unable to resist his. At the suggestion of the messenger, Jiang and Deng Jichong disbanded their army. Liu then had his soldiers put on the uniforms that Jiang's and Deng Jichong's army wore, and then quickly advanced to Wu'an's capital Tan Prefecture (in modern Changsha, Hunan). When they arrived there, the Tan Prefecture's defenders mistook them for Jiang's and Deng Jichong's army, and therefore took no precautions. Liu's army directly headed for the headquarters, where Deng Chuna was holding a feast. They captured Deng Chuna, and Liu executed him and claimed the title of acting military governor. In summer 895, then-reigning Emperor Zhaozong commissioned Liu as the military governor of Wu'an.

In winter 895, after Jiang's request to be the prefect of Shao Prefecture (邵州, in modern Shaoyang) was rebuffed by Liu, he and Deng Jichong rose to oppose Liu. They quickly captured Shao Prefecture and tried to pressure Tan Prefecture. In spring 896, Liu sent Ma Yin to attack Jiang and Deng, and Ma had initial successes. However, during this campaign, Liu was assassinated by his officer Chen Zhan (陳瞻), whose wife Liu had been having an affair with. The soldiers initially supported Zhang to succeed Liu. However, as Zhang was riding a horse to headquarters, the horse suddenly got spooked and bit Zhang in the left leg. This caused Zhang to believe that his succeeding Liu was not in accordance with divine will. He thus issued an order to Ma to return to Tan Prefecture, offering to support him as Liu's successor. Ma thus left his subordinate Li Qiong (李瓊) at Shao to continue the campaign, while he himself returned to Tan. Once Ma returned to Tan, Zhang turned the governance of the circuit over to him, and Ma accepted; Zhang then left to take over the campaign at Shao. Emperor Zhaozong subsequently confirmed Ma as acting military governor.

== As Tang military governor of Wu'an ==
When Ma Yin took over command of Wu'an, he was apprehensive of the strengths of both Yang Xingmi (who was firmly in control of Huainan by that point) and Cheng Rui the military governor of Jingnan Circuit (荊南, headquartered in modern Jingzhou, Hubei), and he considered giving them gold and silk to appease them. His strategist Gao Yu pointed out that Cheng was not as strong as he looked, while Yang was a sworn enemy who could never be appeased through gifts. At Gao's suggestion, Ma concentrated on comforting the people and training his army, to strengthen his own army without external aid.

In 897, Zhang Ji captured Jiang Xun, allowing Shao Prefecture to come under Ma's control. However, it was said that at that point, while Wu'an Circuit legally consisted of seven prefectures, Ma was in actual control of only Tan and Shao; the other five prefectures were all actually controlled by agrarian rebels — Heng (modern Hengyang in Hunan) by Yang Shiyuan (楊師遠), Yong (永州, in modern Yongzhou, Hunan) by Tang Shimin (唐世旻); Dao (道州, in modern Yongzhou) by Cai Jie (蔡結); Chēn (郴州, in modern Chenzhou, Hunan) by Chen Yanqian (陳彥謙); and Lian (連州, in modern Qingyuan, Guangdong) by Lu Jingren (魯景仁). Under the suggestion of Yao Yanzhang, Ma sent an army commanded by Li Qiong and Qin Zongquan's cousin Qin Yanhui (秦彥暉) to attack Heng and Yong, quickly capturing them; Yang died in flight, while Tang was killed by Ma's army. When Ma sent Li Tang (李唐) in 899 to attack Dao, Cai initially repelled Li Tang's attack, but Li Tang subsequently succeeded in capturing Dao and killing Cai, taking Dao under Ma's control as well. By the end of 899, Li Qiong had captured and executed Chen Yanqian, and when he attacked Lian, Lu committed suicide, allowing Ma to control all seven of Wu'an's prefectures. Emperor Zhaozong formally bestowed on Ma the title of military governor.

When Liu Shizheng (劉士政) the military governor of Jingjiang Circuit (靜江, headquartered in modern Guilin, Guangxi) heard that Ma had pacified all of Wu'an, he became apprehensive, and he sent his deputy Chen Kefan (陳可璠) to defend Quanyi Heights (全義嶺, in modern Guilin) against a possible Ma attack. When Ma sent emissaries to Liu to try to establish peaceful relations, Chen refused. Ma, in 900, sent Qin and Li Qiong to attack Jingjiang. They quickly defeated Liu's army, killing Wang Jianwu (王建武) and capturing Chen. They put Jingjiang's capital Gui Prefecture (桂州) under siege, and after a few days of siege, Liu surrendered, allowing Ma to take Jingjiang's five prefectures under control. Ma commissioned Li Qiong as the military governor of Jingjiang.

In 902, Emperor Zhaozong, who was then under the controls of the eunuch Han Quanhui and the warlord Li Maozhen at Li Maozhen's Fengxiang Circuit (鳳翔, headquartered in modern Baoji, Shaanxi), which was then under siege by Zhu Quanzhong, sent the imperial emissary Li Yan to the southeastern circuits to encourage the warlords there to join under Yang's command and attack Zhu. As part of the edicts that Li Yan promulgated, Ma was given the honorary chancellor title of Tong Zhongshu Menxia Pingzhangshi (同中書門下平章事).

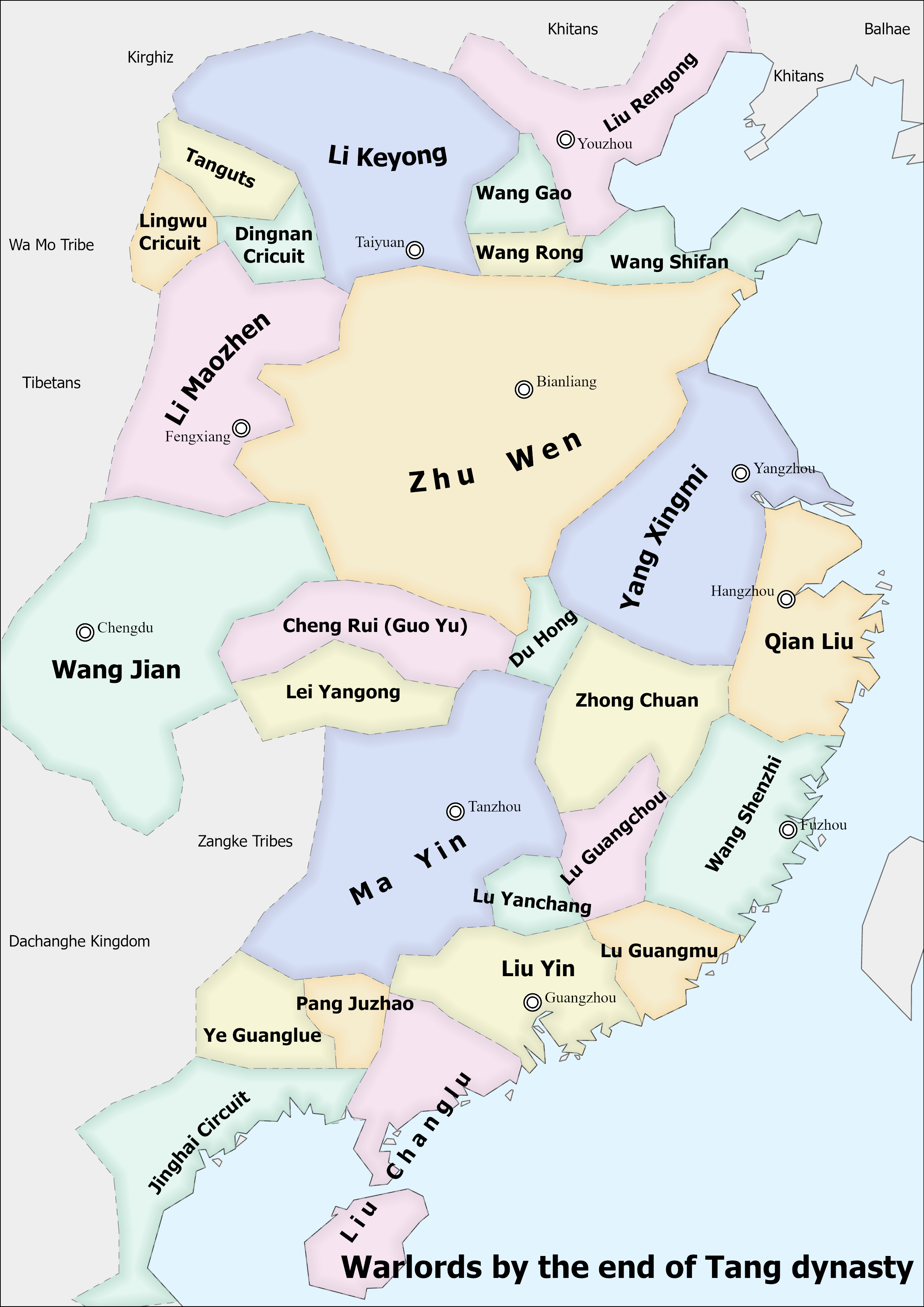
Map of warlords ("jiedushi") in 902, showing Ma Yin and contemporaries

By 903, Zhu had prevailed over Li Maozhen, forcing Li Maozhen to seek peace by killing Han and giving control of the emperor to Zhu. Thereafter, Yang sent emissaries to Ma, accusing Zhu of inappropriate actions, and offering an alliance to Ma if Ma would cut off his relationship with Zhu. Ma's general Xu Dexun pointed out that Zhu controlled the emperor and that it would not be advantageous to Ma to end that relationship. Ma agreed and did not accept Yang's proposal.

Meanwhile, an ally of Zhu's, Du Hong the military governor of Wuchang Circuit (武昌, headquartered in modern Wuhan, Hubei), had been under attack by Yang for several years and was in a desperate situation. Zhu sent his general Han Qing (韓勍) south to try to save Du, while also requesting Cheng, Ma, and Lei Yanwei the military governor of Wuzhen Circuit (武貞, headquartered in modern Changde, Hunan) to launch troops to save Du. Cheng agreed and launched a fleet, which he himself commanded, toward Wuchang. However, after Cheng left his capital Jiangling, Ma sent Xu to join forces with Lei's officer Ouyang Si (歐陽思) to attack Jiangling. They captured it, pillaged it for its population and wealth, and then withdrew. Cheng's army, hearing that their families and wealth had been captured, lost its morale, and was subsequently defeated by Yang's general Li Shenfu; Cheng committed suicide by drowning. On the way back to Tan, Xu met with Deng Jinzhong (鄧進忠) the prefect of Yue Prefecture (岳州, in modern Yueyang, Hunan) and persuaded Deng that he should submit to Ma. Deng agreed, surrendered the prefecture, and moved his entire family to Tan to show submission to Ma. Ma made Xu the prefect of Yue and Deng the prefect of Heng.

In 904, Yang realized that Ma Cong, who remained at Huainan and served in his army for a number of years after Yang defeated Sun Ru, was Ma Yin's brother. He offered to send Ma Cong to Ma Yin. Ma Cong initially declined, indicating that he was grateful for Yang's not killing him at the time of Sun's death and making him a Huainan officer, but Yang insisted. After Ma Cong arrived at Tan, Ma Yin made him the deputy military governor. Ma Cong subsequently advocated an alliance between Ma Yin and Yang, but Ma Yin rejected Ma Cong's proposal.

In 906, Yang's son and successor Yang Wo sent his officer Chen Zhixin (陳知新) to attack Yue Prefecture. Chen was successful, forcing Xu to flee, and Yue fell to Huainan control. During the same year, Peng Gan (彭玕) the prefect of Ji Prefecture (吉州, in modern Ji'an, Jiangxi) surrendered Ji to Ma, after Yang Wo had conquered most of Zhennan Circuit (which Ji Prefecture belonged to) and captured its military governor Zhong Kuangshi.

== During Later Liang ==
=== During Emperor Taizu's reign ===
In 907, Zhu Quanzhong had Emperor Zhaozong's son and successor Emperor Ai yield the throne to him, ending Tang and establishing a new Later Liang as its Emperor Taizu. Several Tang warlords, including Yang Wo, Li Maozhen, Li Keyong, and Wang Jian, refused to recognize him as emperor, but the rest of the formerly Tang realm did, including Ma Yin's Wu'an Circuit. Shortly thereafter, the new Later Liang emperor created Ma the Prince of Chu. Emperor Taizu also gave him the title of military governor of Wuchang, even though he did not control Wuchang.

Later that year, Yang Wo (whose state became known as Hongnong by that point as he carried the title of Prince of Hongnong) sent his general Liu Cun (劉存) with 30,000 men to attack Chu. Ma sent Qin Yanhui and Huang Fan (黃璠) to resist Liu. Liu's fleet soon ran into difficulties due to torrential rains and was repeatedly defeated by Qin. Liu thus sent letters to Ma, offering to surrender, but Qin, arguing to Ma that Liu's surrender offers were deceitful, continued attacking. Qin thoroughly defeated Liu and captured Liu and his deputy Chen Zhixin (陳知新). Initially, Ma tried to persuade Liu and Chen to submit to him and serve him, but after they refused, he executed them. This battle allowed Ma to regain Yue Prefecture. Ma then joined forces with Peng Gan to try to capture Zhennan's capital Hong Prefecture (洪州), but they could not do so. Subsequently, he and Lei Yanwei's brother and successor Lei Yangong jointly attacked Jingnan, which was then under the control of the Later Liang general Gao Jixing, but they were repelled.

Later in 907, when Lei again made an unsuccessful attempt to capture Jiangling and entered into an alliance with Hongnong, Emperor Taizu stripped him of his titles and ordered Gao and Ma to attack him. Gao sent his general Ni Kefu (倪可福), while Ma sent Qin, to put Wuzhen's capital Lang Prefecture (朗州) under siege. When Lei sought aid from Huainan, Yang sent Ling Ye (泠業) and Li Rao (李饒) to try to save Lei. Ma sent Xu Dexun to resist Ling and Li Rao, and he defeated and captured them; Ma then executed them. In summer 908, without Hongnong aid, Lang Prefecture fell. Lei fled to Hongnong territory, allowing Ma to take over Lang and Li (澧州, in modern Changde) Prefectures.

Meanwhile, Gao Yu pointed out to Ma that one way to enrich his state was to sell tea to territory directly under Later Liang control. Thereafter, Ma requested and received permission from Emperor Taizu to establish tea trade offices at Bian Prefecture (汴州, in modern Kaifeng), Jiangling, Xiang Prefecture (襄州, in modern Xiangyang, Hubei), Tang Prefecture (唐州, in modern Zhumadian), Ying (郢州, in modern Jingmen, Hubei), and Fù Prefecture (復州, in modern Tianmen, Hubei), for the purpose of selling Chu tea and purchasing silk and horses, with part of the tea offered to the Later Liang imperial government as tribute. It was said that Chu began to be enriched after this trade began. Later in the year, when Gao Jixing tried to cut off this trade by stationing forces at Hankou (漢口, in modern Wuhan), Ma sent Xu to attack him, and Gao Jixing, in fear, sought peace. Ma also sent Lü Shizhou (呂師周) to attack the territory of Liu Yin the military governor of Qinghai Circuit (清海, headquartered in modern Guangzhou, Guangdong), capturing Zhao (昭州, in modern Guilin), He (賀州, in modern Hezhou, Guangxi), Wu (梧州, in modern Wuzhou, Guangxi), Meng (蒙州, in modern Wuzhou), Gong (龔州, in modern Guigang, Guangxi), and Fù (富州, in modern Hezhou, note different character than the prefecture in Tianmen) Prefectures from Liu Yin.

In 909, Wei Quanfeng, who had been controlling four Zhennan prefectures centered around Fǔ Prefecture (撫州, in modern Fuzhou, Jiangxi, note different tone than the prefectures in Tianmen and Hezhou) for years, claimed the title of military governor of Zhennan and set out to attack Hong Prefecture. When Wei sought support from Ma, Ma sent Wan Mei (苑玫) and Peng Gan's nephew Peng Yanzhang (彭彥章) to put Gao'an (高安, in modern Yichun, Jiangxi) under siege to divert Hongnong forces. Subsequently, after Wei was defeated and captured by the Hongnong general Zhou Ben, Chu forces withdrew. Further, Peng Gan abandoned Ji Prefecture and fled to Tan, thus allowing Hongnong to take over Ji. Ma made Peng Gan the prefect of Chēn Prefecture, and took one of Peng's daughters as the wife of his son Ma Xifan.

In 910, after Ma requested the title of Tiance Shangjiang (天策上將, literally "Grand General of Heavenly Strategies"), a title that had previously been held by the great Tang emperor Emperor Taizong, Emperor Taizu granted him that title. Ma thereafter established an Tiance Office and made Ma Cong and Ma Cun its directors.

Meanwhile, Song Ye (宋鄴) and Pan Jinsheng (潘金盛), the chieftains of non-Han peoples at Chén Prefecture (辰州, in modern Huaihua, Hunan, note different tone than the prefecture in Chenzhou) and Xu Prefecture (漵州, in modern Huaihua), had been harassing cities under Chu control. In late 910, when Song attacked Xiangxiang (湘鄉, in modern Xiangtan, Hunan), and Pan attacked Wugang (武岡, in modern Shaoyang), Ma sent Lü to attack them. Lü soon killed Pan, and, by 912, Song and another non-Han chieftain, Chang Shiyi (昌師益), had submitted to Ma.

Also in 910, Pang Juzhao (龐巨昭) the military governor of Ningyuan Circuit (寧遠, headquartered in modern Yulin, Guangxi), and Liu Changlu (劉昌魯) the defender of Gao Prefecture (高州, in modern Maoming, Guangdong), who had just recently repelled an attack by Liu Yin but believed that they had no strength to stand against Liu Yin long term, wrote to Ma, offering their territory to him. Ma sent Yao Yanzhang (姚彥章) to their territory to escort them to Chu proper. He had Yao serve as the prefect of Ningyuan's capital Rong Prefecture (容州) to defend the territory, and subsequently had him made the deputy military governor of Ningyuan. However, in 911, when Liu Yin attacked again, Yao judged the situation untenable despite a relief force commanded by Xu. He therefore took the people of Rong Prefecture and returned to Chu proper, allowing Liu Yin to take over Rong and Gao Prefectures. Despite this setback, Emperor Taizu still bestowed on Ma the titles of military governor of Wu'an, Wuchang, Jingjiang, and Ningyuan, as well as the commanders of the forces against Hong and E (鄂州, Wuchang's capital) Prefectures. However, not wanting to see prolonged warfare between Ma and Liu Yin, both of whom were his vassals, he sent a number of emissaries to try to broker peace between them.

=== After Emperor Taizu's reign ===
In 912, the Wu (i.e., Hongnong, which was now referred to in historical accounts as Wu, as Yang Wo's brother and successor Yang Longyan, while initially carrying the title of Prince of Hongnong as well, later took on the title of Prince of Wu, which Yang Xingmi had carried at the time of his death) general Chen Zhang (陳璋) attacked Yue Prefecture, capturing Wan, who was then the prefect of Yue. When Ma sent Yang Dingzhen (楊定真) to try to recapture Yue, the Wu forces headed toward Jingnan instead. To prevent Ma from aiding Jingnan, the Wu general Liu Xin (劉信), who governed Wei's old territory of Fǔ Prefecture and its surroundings, stationed himself at Ji Prefecture to pressure Ma. Subsequently, though, after Chen was unable to capture Jiangling, he withdrew. In 913, apparently in response, Yao, who carried the title of military governor of Ningyuan by that point despite Chu's loss of Ningyuan, attacked E Prefecture, but when the Wu general Lü Shizao (呂師造) responded, Yao withdrew.

Also in 913, Liu Yin's brother and successor Liu Yan requested that Ma Yin give a daughter to him in marriage. Ma agreed. (The marriage alliance was eventually concluded in 915, when Ma Yin had Ma Cun escort his daughter to Liu Yan's territory to marry Liu Yan.)

In 914, the Wu prefect of Yuan Prefecture (袁州, in modern Yichun), Liu Chongjing (劉崇景), surrendered the prefecture to Ma. Ma sent Xu Zhen (許貞) to support him. After the Wu generals Chai Zaiyong (柴再用) and Mi Zhicheng (米志誠) attacked, however, Liu and Xu abandoned Yuan Prefecture and returned to Chu territory.

In 916, hearing that Li Keyong's son and successor Li Cunxu the Prince of Jin had conquered all of the territory north of the Yellow River in his continued war with Later Liang (which was then ruled by Emperor Taizu's son Zhu Zhen after Emperor Taizu was assassinated in 912 by another son, Zhu Yougui), Ma, despite his status as a Later Liang vassal, sent emissaries to Jin as a peace overture; Li Cunxu reciprocated.

In 918, Liu Xin put Qian Prefecture (虔州, in modern Ganzhou, Jiangxi), which was then ruled by the warlord Tan Quanbo, whose territory was wedged between Wu, Chu, and the territories of the Later Liang vassals Liu Yan and Wang Shenzhi the Prince of Min, under siege. Tan sought aid from three states which were Later Liang vassals — Wuyue, Min, and Chu. In response, Wuyue's prince Qian Liu sent his son Qian Chuanqiu (錢傳球) to attack Wu's Xin Prefecture (信州, in modern Shangrao, Jiangxi); Ma sent his officer Zhang Keqiu (張可求) to advance to Gutting (古亭, in modern Ganzhou); and Wang sent an army to advance to Yudu (雩都, in modern Ganzhou), all seeking to aid Tan. The Wuyue forces, however, were repelled by Xin's prefect Zhou Ben. Subsequently, Liu sent part of his army to repel the Chu army. When the Wuyue and Min forces heard that the Chu army had been repelled, they withdrew, leaving Tan without external aid.

In 919, Chu forces attacked Jingnan, and Gao Jixing sought aid from Wu. Wu had Liu Xin head directly toward Tan Prefecture, while Li Jian (李簡) attacked Chu's Fù Prefecture (復州). Li Jian captured Fù's prefect Bao Tang (鮑唐), and the Chu forces, hearing of Liu Xin's advances, withdrew from Jingnan.

In 920, Qian sought to have Ma give a daughter to his son Qian Chuansu (錢傳璛) in marriage, and Ma agreed.

== During Later Tang ==
=== During Emperor Zhuangzong's reign ===
In 923, Li Cunxu claimed himself to be the legitimate successor to Tang, establishing a new Later Tang as its Emperor Zhuangzong. Thereafter, he made a surprise attack on the Later Liang capital Daliang (大梁, i.e., formerly Bian Prefecture), catching it defenseless. Zhu Zhen, not wanting to be captured, committed suicide before the city fell to Later Tang forces, ending Later Liang. The circuits that had previously been controlled by Later Liang came under Later Tang control. Ma Yin, hearing of the Later Tang victory, sent Ma Xifan to Daliang to pay tribute to Emperor Zhuangzong. When Ma Xifan met Emperor Zhuangzong, Emperor Zhuangzong asked him about the events in the Chu realm and was impressed. Wanting to praise Ma Xifan while, at the same time, sow seeds of suspicion by Ma Yin against Gao Yu, he stated to Ma Xifan, "I had often heard that one day Gao Yu would take over the Hunan region. If the Prince of Chu has a son like you, how could Gao do so?" Despite this attempt by Emperor Zhuangzong to cause Ma Yin to suspect Gao, Ma Yin refused to do so and continued to trust Gao. Indeed, it was said that it was Gao's suggestion that Ma, who was enticing merchants to come to Chu by collecting no transactional taxes from them, coined money out of iron and lead — two metals that were not used for money outside of the Chu realm. As a result, the merchants were forced to spend the money by purchasing items from Chu, thus allowing Chu to enrich itself through these commercial activities. Further, also at Gao's suggestion, to encourage sericulture, Ma also allowed the people of his realm to pay taxes with silk in lieu of money, and it was said that after several years of this policy, Chu had become a major producer of silk.

In 924, Emperor Zhuangzong bestowed on Ma Yin the title of Shangshu Ling (尚書令).

In 925, Emperor Zhuangzong sent his son Li Jiji the Prince of Wei and the major general Guo Chongtao to attack Former Shu (which was then ruled by Wang Jian's son and successor Wang Zongyan. Former Shu quickly fell and was absorbed into Later Tang. Hearing of Former Shu's destruction, Ma, in fear, submitted a report to Emperor Zhuangzong, stating:

I have started managing a mansion at the foot of Mount Heng to be my place of retirement. I am willing to surrender my seal and commission to preserve my old years.

Emperor Zhuangzong sent Ma a reply comforting him and declining his resignation.

However, despite the apparent Later Tang strength that the destruction of Former Shu showed, Emperor Zhuangzong's rule was actually becoming destabilized due to the soldiers' discontent toward his failure to implement his prior promises of rewards to them for their achievements in destroying Later Liang and Former Shu, and the discontent was further exacerbated by the subsequent executions of Guo and another major general, Li Jilin the Prince of Xiping by Emperor Zhuangzong and his wife Empress Liu. Thereafter, Emperor Zhuangzong's adoptive brother Li Siyuan rebelled at Daming (大名, in modern Handan, Hebei). By summer 926, another mutiny at the capital Luoyang caused Emperor Zhuangzong to die in battle. Li Siyuan subsequently declared himself emperor (as Emperor Mingzong).

=== During Emperor Mingzong's reign ===
After Emperor Mingzong took the throne, he confirmed Ma Yin's title of Shangshu Ling. Meanwhile, with Gao Jixing taking an increasingly confrontational attitude with the Later Tang court, including seizure of a major shipment of Former Shu wealth that Li Jiji (prior to Emperor Zhuangzong's death and his own suicide) sent toward Luoyang, as well as the seizure of three prefectures that formerly belonged to Former Shu, Emperor Mingzong sent the general Liu Xun (劉訓) to attack Jingnan. Ma sent Xu Dexun with a fleet toward Jingnan, but stopped Xu's fleet at Yue Prefecture. Meanwhile, Gao defended Jiangling and refused to engage Liu, who soon became bogged down in his attack due to rains and illnesses afflicting his army. Emperor Mingzong sent the chief of staff Kong Xun to the front to examine the situation, and Kong tried to entice Ma to join the battle as well by sending a gift of clothes to the Chu army and horses and jade belts to Ma personally, and requesting that Ma send food supplies to Liu's army — a request that Ma apparently did not openly reject but never carried out. Eventually, Liu was forced to withdraw, and Jingnan became effectively independent of Later Tang after that point.

In 927, Emperor Mingzong bestowed the greater title of King of Chu (楚國王) on Ma. After accepting the title, Ma took on greater royal trappings, including referring to his residence as palace and establishing the various offices for his officials like an imperial regime, only changing the official titles somewhat to show deference to the Later Tang emperor. He made Yao Yanzhang and Xu his chancellors. He assumed all responsibilities for commissioning officials within his reign, except that he would submit reports after commissioning the military governors of Wuping (武平, i.e., formerly Wuzhen) and Jingjiang.

In 928, Ma sent Yuan Quan (袁詮), Wang Huan (王環), and his son Ma Xizhan (馬希瞻), to attack Jingnan. After the Chu forces dealt the Jingnan forces a major defeat at Liulang Ford (劉郎洑, in modern Jingzhou), Gao, in fear, returned the Chu emissary to Later Tang, Shi Guangxian (史光憲) (whom Gao had seized after turning against Later Tang). When Ma subsequently blamed Wang for not further destroying Jingnan, Wang responded:

Jiangling is between the Central Dynasty [(i.e., Later Tang)], Wu, and Shu, and everyone wants it. It is best that we let it stand so that it can serve as our defense.

Ma understood the point and thereafter did not speak of capturing Jingnan any further.

Meanwhile, also in 928, Ma sent a fleet to attack Feng Prefecture (封州, in modern Zhaoqing, Guangdong), which belonged to Liu Yan — who, by that point, had declared himself emperor of a new state of Southern Han. The fleet, however, was defeated by the Southern Han general Su Zhang (蘇章) and forced to withdraw.

Later in 928, Wu launched a major attack on Yue Prefecture, commanded by Miao Lin (苗璘) and Wang Yanzhang (王彥章). Ma sent Xu to face them. Xu secretly sent Wang Huan with a smaller fleet to get behind the Wu fleet, and then attacked the Wu fleet from both ends. The result was a major Chu victory, and both Miao and Wang Yanzhang were captured. Subsequently, though, to try to make peace with Wu, Ma sent both Miao and Wang Yanzhang back to Wu. When sending them off at a feast, Xu, who had by this point had become concerned that Ma's sons were fighting over succession rights, made what was later viewed as a prophetic statement:

While Chu is small, its senior officials and generals are still present. I hope that the Wu Dynasty will not again think of it. For you to consider attacking us, you have to wait until the ponies [(i.e., Ma's sons, with Xu employing a double entendre given that "Ma" meant "horse")] are fighting over the stable.

Meanwhile, Gao, after breaking with Emperor Mingzong, submitted to Wu, and the Wu emperor Yang Pu (Yang Longyan's brother and successor) created Gao the Prince of Qin. Emperor Mingzong ordered Ma to attack Jingnan. Ma sent Xu and Ma Xifan to attack Jingnan. When the two armies met, Gao Jixing's nephew Gao Congsi (高從嗣) challenged Ma Xifan to single combat, but the Chu officer Liao Kuangqi (廖匡齊) came out and engaged Gao Congsi instead, killing him. Gao Jixing then sued for peace, and Xu and Ma Xifan withdrew. However, for some time, there continued to be border skirmishes between Chu and Jingnan.

Meanwhile, as Xu perceived, there was a struggle over succession rights. Ma Yin's oldest son, Ma Xizhen (馬希振), was born of his wife (whose name was not recorded in history), but his favorite son was his second son Ma Xisheng, who was born of his favorite concubine Consort Yuan. Ma Xizhen, not wanting to fight over the succession with Ma Xisheng, became a Taoist monk and retired from politics. In 929, Ma formally put Ma Xisheng, who then carried the title of deputy military governor of Wu'an and acting mayor of the capital Changsha, in charge of the Chu administration. From this point on, all matters of state were to be reported to Ma Xisheng first, before being reported to Ma Yin, and this effectively designated Ma Xisheng as Ma Yin's heir. However, Ma Xifan, who was born on the same day as (but apparently later in the day than) Ma Xisheng, resented Ma Xisheng for not even showing any sign of deferring to him. He hated Ma Xisheng and Consort Yuan from this point on.

In late 928, Gao Jixing died and was succeeded by his son Gao Conghui. Gao Conghui, believing that his small state could not withstand Later Tang military pressure if it continued to confront Later Tang, resubmitted to Emperor Mingzong through Ma Yin and the Later Tang military governor of Shannan East Circuit (山南東道, headquartered in modern Xiangyang), An Yuanxin (安元信).

After Ma Xisheng took the reins of the state, he began to run into conflicts with Gao Yu, and he was also suspicious of Gao due to the prior seeds of suspicion sewn by Emperor Zhuangzong and Gao Jixing (who, while alive, had publicly stated that he wanted to enter into a blood brotherhood with Gao because he believed that Gao would become Chu's ruler). In 929, with Ma Xisheng repeatedly requesting it, Ma Yin ordered Gao into retirement. Gao, in frustration, stated, "I am going to build a mansion in the hills to the west, for retirement. The pony [(employing a similar double entendre as Xu did)] has grown up and can bite now." Ma Xisheng heard the remark and became angry — so angry that he falsely announced that Gao had committed treason, and he slaughtered Gao and his family, without first informing Ma Yin. When Ma Yin heard this, he cried bitterly, but did not punish Ma Xisheng.

Ma Yin died in 930. He left instructions that his sons were to pass the throne to their younger brothers, and further ordered that anyone who spoke against this succession principle be put to death. Ma Xisheng thereafter took over control of the state.

== Personal information ==
- Father
  - Ma Yuanfeng (馬元豐), posthumously honored King Jingzhuang of Chu
- Wife
  - Name unknown, mother of Ma Xizhen
- Major Concubines
  - Consort Yuan, mother of Ma Xisheng and Ma Xiwang
  - Lady Chen, mother of Ma Xifan
  - Lady Hua, mother of Ma Xigao
- Children (Ma Yin had at least 35 sons, but the names of most of them were lost to history)
  - Ma Xizhen (馬希振), became Taoist monk
  - Ma Xisheng (馬希聲) (899–932), later prince
  - Ma Xifan (馬希範) (899–947), later prince
  - Ma Xiwang (馬希旺) (d. ~933)
  - Ma Xigao (馬希杲) (poisoned by Ma Xifan 945)
  - Ma Xi'e (馬希萼), later prince
  - Ma Xiguang (馬希廣), later prince (died 950)
  - Ma Xichong (馬希崇), later prince
  - Ma Xizhan (馬希瞻) (died 949)
  - Ma Xineng (馬希能)
  - Ma Xiguan (馬希貫)
  - Ma Xiyin (馬希隱)
  - Ma Xijun (馬希濬)
  - Ma Xizhi (馬希知)
  - Ma Xilang (馬希朗)
  - daughter, Empress Ma of Southern Han, wife of Liu Yan
  - daughter, wife of Qian Chuansu (錢傳璛), son of Qian Liu the King of Wuyue

== Notes ==
Chinese nobility
New creation	Prince/King of Chu; 907–930	Succeeded by Ma Xisheng (as Prince of Hengyang)
Preceded by Liu Jianfeng	Ruler of China (Hunan region) (de facto); 896–930	Succeeded by Ma Xisheng (as Prince of Hengyang)
Preceded by Li Siyuan of Later Tang	Ruler of China (Hunan region) (de jure); 927–930	Succeeded by Li Siyuan of Later Tang
