= Zhang Juyong =

Zhang Juyong (張居詠), formally Duke Yi of Qinghe (清河懿公), was a chancellor of the Chinese Five Dynasties and Ten Kingdoms Period state Southern Tang and possibly its predecessor state Wu.

== During Wu ==
Zhang Juyong's birth date and geographic origin have been lost to history, as has his early career. It is known that he served as a Wu official, and eventually reached the high position of Menxia Shilang (門下侍郎, deputy head of the examination bureau of government (門下省, Menxia Sheng)) — typically a position for a chancellor, although it is not clear whether he received the typical chancellor designation of Tong Zhongshu Menxia Pingzhangshi (同中書門下平章事).

== During Southern Tang ==
In 937, the Wu regent Xu Zhigao had Wu's emperor Yang Pu yield the throne to him, ending Wu and starting a new state of Southern Tang as its emperor. Xu, upon assuming the throne, commissioned Zhang Juyong, as well as Zhang Yanhan and Li Jianxun, chancellors, with the designation Tong Zhongshu Menxia Pingzhangshi.

In 939, Zhang Juyong was apparently among a group of officials who formally proposed that Xu Zhigao assume his birth family name of Li. (Xu Zhigao had used the family name of Xu because he was adopted by Xu Wen, who was his predecessor as regent, as a child.) Xu Zhigao accepted the proposal and took the new name of Li Bian. Zhang Juyong was thereafter given the addition title of Zuo Pushe (左僕射, one of the heads of the executive bureau (尚書省, Shangshu Sheng), while continuing to retain the titles of Menxia Shilang and chancellor. It was said that Zhang Juyong was graceful, silent, and moderate, and that, as chancellor, he expressed few of his opinions.

Li Bian died in 943 and was succeeded by his son Li Jing. In 944, Li Jing removed Zhang from his chancellor position and made him the military governor (Jiedushi) of Zhenhai Circuit (鎮海, headquartered in modern Zhenjiang, Jiangsu). Zhang died not long after, and was given posthumous honors, including the title of Duke of Qinghe and the posthumous name of Yi (懿, "benevolent").

== Notes and references ==
- Spring and Autumn Annals of the Ten Kingdoms, vol. 21.
- Zizhi Tongjian, vols. 281, 283.
