= Dowager Shi =

Dowager Shi may refer to:

- Queen Dowager Shi (died c. 920), concubine of the late-Tang warlord Yang Xingmi and the mother of Yang Wu rulers Yang Wo and Yang Longyan
- Grandmother Jia, a character from the Chinese novel Dream of the Red Chamber

== See also ==
- She Saihua or Dowager She, a character from the Generals of the Yang Family legends
