= Emperor Rui =

Emperor Rui can refer to:

- Yang Pu (900-939), formally Emperor Rui of Wu (吳睿帝)
- Zhengtong Emperor (1427–1464), posthumous name Emperor Rui of Ming (睿皇帝)
- Jiaqing Emperor (1760–1820), posthumous name Emperor Rui of Qing (睿皇帝)
