= Queen Dowager Shi =

Queen Dowager Shi (史太妃, personal name unknown) was a concubine of the late-Tang dynasty warlord Yang Xingmi and the mother of two of Yang Xingmi's sons, Yang Wo and Yang Longyan (also known as Yang Wei), both of whom would become rulers of the Five Dynasties and Ten Kingdoms period state Wu (known as Hongnong during Yang Wo's reign), and thus was a queen dowager of Wu.

== Background ==
It is not known when Lady Shi was born. According to the Spring and Autumn Annals of the Ten Kingdoms (十國春秋), her family was from the Qi-Lu region (i.e., modern Shandong), but the same source also noted a possible alternative origin—that she was a cousin of Shi Jingsi, a general under Jin's prince Li Keyong. She became a concubine of Yang Xingmi's during the reign of Emperor Xizong of Tang (r. 873–888) and bore him his two oldest sons, Yang Wo (born 886) and Yang Longyan (born 897). There was no record on whether Yang Xingmi made her his wife after he divorced his wife Lady Zhu in 903, but it is known that she was created the Lady of Yuzhang, while Lady Zhu previously held the greater title of Lady of Yan.

== As lady dowager ==
Yang Xingmi died in 905. Yang Wo succeeded him as the Tang military governor (Jiedushi) of Huainan Circuit (淮南, headquartered in modern Yangzhou, Jiangsu) and the effective ruler of rest of Yang Xingmi's domain, which effectively became an independent state after rival warlord Zhu Quanzhong seized the Tang throne and declared himself emperor of a new state of Later Liang in 907—although Yang Wo continued to use the Tang era name of Tianyou and thus his domain remained technically a part of the defunct Tang state. He carried the title of Prince of Hongnong, which had been bestowed by the Tang imperial emissary Li Yan. He honored his mother Lady Shi as Lady Dowager.

However, Yang Wo lost most of his effective power in a coup headed by his officers Zhang Hao and Xu Wen in 907. He was angry about the situation, and Zhang and Xu thus feared that he would seize power again and carry out retribution against them. They therefore assassinated him in 908 and initially planned to divide up his territory and submit to Later Liang. However, at a subsequent emergency meeting between Zhang, Xu, and the other key officials, where Zhang initially postured that he was going to take over the domain, the official Yan Keqiu read a statement out loud (which Yan claimed to have been written by Lady Dowager Shi, but Yan himself had written) that called for Yang Longyan to succeed Yang Wo as prince. Zhang did not dare to respond, and Yang Longyan was allowed to succeed Yang Wo as the Prince of Hongnong. Soon thereafter, Xu assassinated Zhang and blamed Yang Wo's death on Zhang alone, and took over effective rein of the state, formally under Yang Longyan's authority. When Xu went to the palace to report to Lady Dowager Shi what had occurred, she tearfully responded:

My son was still very young, but suffered this kind of disaster. I just hope that you, Lord, will allow the 100 persons of the Yang household to return to Lu Prefecture [(廬州, in modern Hefei, Anhui, Yang Xingmi's original home territory)].

Xu thereafter tried to comfort her and again blamed the assassination on Zhang alone.

== As queen dowager ==
In 919, Xu Wen urged Yang Longyan (who, by that point, was using the title of Prince of Wu, a title that Yang Xingmi held at the time of his death) to declare Wu to be a new state and declare himself emperor. Yang Longyan declined the imperial title, but changed his own title to King of Wu and stopped the use of the Tang era name, effectively declaring his state independent. He honored Lady Dowager Shi as queen dowager. She was said to have died sometime thereafter, with the date of death unknown—but it appeared to be prior to or in 921, when Yang Longyan died and was succeeded by his younger half-brother Yang Pu, for Yang Pu then honored his own mother Lady Wang as queen dowager, implying that Queen Dowager Shi was no longer living.
