= Zhong Chuan =

Zhong Chuan or Zhong Zhuan (鍾傳) (died 906), formally the Prince of Nanping (南平王), was a warlord of the late Tang dynasty, who controlled a large portion of Zhennan Circuit (鎮南, headquartered in modern Nanchang, Jiangxi, formerly known as Jiangxi (江西)) as its military governor (Jiedushi) for over 20 years.

== Background and seizure of Jiangxi ==
It is not known when Zhong Chuan was born, but it is known that he was from Gao'an (高安, in modern Yichun, Jiangxi) and that he was a merchant when he was young and liked hunting. On one occasion, when he was drunk, he encountered a tiger. Instead of fleeing, he decided to fight the tiger even though he was unarmed. The tiger pawed his shoulder, but he was able to hold on to the tiger and make it impossible for the tiger to attack him further. Other people came to his aid and killed the tiger. (Zhong would eventually regret this incident deeply and use it to encourage his sons to use their intellects rather than brute force.)

In the 870s, the major agrarian rebel Wang Xianzhi roamed the Yangtze River region, including Jiangxi Circuit, which Zhong's home territory belonged to. Zhong gathered a group of non-Han residents of the region and went up into the mountains, using the mountains as their defense, eventually with the group increasing to 10,000 people. At one point, after Wang captured but abandoned Fu Prefecture (撫州, in modern Fuzhou, Jiangxi), Zhong took over the prefecture, and then-reigning Emperor Xizong thereafter made Zhong the prefect of Fu. In 882, after Wang's erstwhile ally Huang Chao captured the imperial capital Chang'an and forced Emperor Xizong to flee to Chengdu, Zhong attacked Jiangxi's capital Hong Prefecture (洪州) and expelled the imperially-commissioned governor (觀察使, Guanchashi) Gao Maoqing (高茂卿). The imperial government, which was also dealing with Min Xu's takeover of Hunan Circuit (湖南, headquartered in modern Changsha, Hunan), decided to convert Jiangxi into a military circuit (Zhennan) and commission Min as the military governor of Zhennan, hoping that Min would attack Zhong, but Min, not wanting to do so, declined. Later that year, at the request of Gao Pian the military governor of nearby Huainan Circuit (淮南, headquartered in modern Yangzhou, Jiangsu), the imperial government capitulated and made Zhong the governor of Jiangxi. (Thereafter, the Fu Prefecture local militia leader Wei Quanfeng seized Fu and had his brother Wei Zaichang (危仔倡) take over Xin Prefecture (信州, in modern Shangrao, Jiangxi).) Soon thereafter, Emperor Xizong made Zhong the military governor of Zhennan, bestowed the honorary titles of acting Taibao (太保) and Zhongshu Ling (中書令, an honorary chancellor designation) on him, and created him the Prince of Yingchuan; that latter title was later changed to Prince of Nanping.

== Governance of Zhennan Circuit ==
Only sporadic records of Zhong Chuan's acts as military governor were recorded in traditional historical sources. It was said that, as Tang imperial authority fell apart after Huang Chao's rebellion, few regional governors sent imperial examinees to Chang'an for the imperial examinations, but Zhong did so — and he would hold solemn ceremonies to send the examinees off and reward them greatly; therefore, many people who wished to receive Zhong's largess came a long distance to see Zhong. It was also said that whenever Zhong was planning a campaign, he would first offer sacrifices at Buddhist temples, and stack the offered pastries into the forms of rhinoceroses and elephants. Late in his governance, he levied heavy taxes; in response, the merchants abandoned trade routes that went through Zhennan Circuit.

In 896, Zhong, as well as Qian Liu the military governor of Zhenhai Circuit (鎮海, headquartered in modern Hangzhou, Zhejiang) and Du Hong the military governor of Wuchang Circuit (武昌, headquartered in modern Wuhan, Hubei), in fear of expansions by Yang Xingmi the military governor of Huainan, sought aid from the powerful warlord Zhu Quanzhong the military governor of Xuanwu Circuit (宣武, headquartered in modern Kaifeng, Henan) to the north, to stem Yang's expansion. Zhu sent his adoptive son Zhu Yougong (朱友恭) with an army to attack Huainan, but while Zhu Yougong later helped Du to defend against Yang's attacks, there was no record of any further interaction between Zhong and Zhu Quanzhong.

In 897, Zhong planned to attack Zhou Bei (周琲) the prefect of Ji Prefecture (吉州, in modern Ji'an, Jiangxi). In response, Zhou abandoned Ji Prefecture and fled to Huainan.

In 898, Emperor Xizong's brother and successor Emperor Zhaozong bestowed on Zhong the honorary chancellor title of Shizhong (侍中).

In 901, Zhong attacked Wei Quanfeng at Fu Prefecture. During the siege, there was a sudden fire that occurred within the city. His officers suggested that he use this opportunity to attack. Zhong responded, "It is not gracious to attack while the enemy is in danger." He further prayed, "When Wei Quanfeng is being punished, may it be that the people are not." After the fire was put out, Wei heard of what Zhong did, and sent messengers to apologize to Zhong and offer to give a daughter in marriage to Zhong's son Zhong Kuangshi.

== Death and succession ==
Meanwhile, Zhong Chuan had made both Zhong Kuangshi and an adoptive son, Zhong Yangui (鍾延規), prefects (Zhong Kuangshi was made the prefect of Yuan Prefecture (袁州, in modern Yichun) and Zhong Yangui the prefect of Jiang Prefecture (江州, in modern Jiujiang, Jiangxi). When Zhong Chuan died in 906, the soldiers supported Zhong Kuangshi to take over the circuit as acting military governor. Zhong Yangui, resentful that he was unable to succeed Zhong Chuan, submitted to Yang Wo (Yang Xingmi's son and successor) the military governor of Huainan. Due to this internal division within Zhennan, Yang Wo was able to conquer Zhennan later in the year, ending the Zhong family's hold on the circuit.

== Notes and references ==
- New Book of Tang, vol. 190.
- History of the Five Dynasties, vol. 17.
- New History of the Five Dynasties, vol. 41.
- Zizhi Tongjian, vols. 255, 260, 261, 262, 265.
