= Ma Xifan =

Prince of Chu from 934 to 947

Prince Wenzhao of Chu 楚文昭王
- Prince of Chu

Prince of Chu
- Tenure: 7 February 934 – 30 May 947
- Predecessor: Vacant (Ma Yin as King of Chu)
- Successor: Ma Xiguang

Jiedushi of Wu'an Circuit (武安軍節度使)
- Tenure: 14 September 932 – 30 May 947
- Predecessor: Ma Xisheng
- Successor: Ma Xiguang
- Born: 899 likely Changsha, Tang
- Died: 30 May 947; Changsha, Chu
- Wife: Lady Peng
- Issue: One or more sons, name(s) unknown
Names
- Mǎ Xīfàn (馬希範)
Era dates
- Adopted the era names of Later Tang: Changxing (長興): 930–932; Yingshun (應順): 934; Qingtai (清泰): 934–936; Adopted the era names of Later Jin: Tianfu (天福): 936–944; Kaiyun (開運): 944–947
Posthumous name
- Prince Wénzhāo (文昭王, "civil and accomplished")
- House: Ma
- Dynasty: Ma Chu
- Father: Ma Yin
- Mother: Lady Chen

Ma Xifan (traditional Chinese: 馬希範; simplified Chinese: 马希范; pinyin: Mǎ Xīfàn; 899 – 30 May 947), courtesy name Baogui (寶規), also known by his posthumous name as the Prince Wenzhao of Chu (楚文昭王), was the third ruler of the Ma Chu dynasty of China during the Five Dynasties and Ten Kingdoms period.

== Background ==
Ma Xifan was born in 899, during the reign of Emperor Zhaozong of Tang, as the fourth son of the warlord Ma Yin. At that time, Ma Yin had just taken control of Tan Prefecture (in modern Changsha, Hunan) following the assassination of Ma Yin's predecessor Liu Jianfeng, and was not yet fully in control of Wu'an Circuit (武安, headquartered at Tan Prefecture), which would eventually become the central circuit for the Chu state, but was in the process of gradually consolidating his control. Ma Xifan's mother was a Lady Chen, who was Ma Yin's concubine, not his wife—as Ma Yin's first son, Ma Xizhen (馬希振), was said to be born of his wife, who was not named in historical sources. (Lady Chen later bore at least one younger son among Ma Yin's at least 35 sons, Ma Xiguang.) Ma Xifan and his brother, Ma Yin's second son Ma Xisheng, were born on the same day, but Ma Xisheng was born earlier on that day. (Another brother, unnamed in historical sources, was therefore likely born on the same day of a different mother, between Ma Xisheng's and Ma Xifan's births.)

In 909—by which time Tang had fallen, and Ma was ruling his own domain as the Prince of Chu, as a vassal to Tang's successor state Later Liang—there was a time when forces of Chu's northeastern neighbor Wu were battling the forces of the warlord Wei Quanfeng, who controlled four prefectures centered around Fu Prefecture (撫州, in modern Fuzhou, Jiangxi). The Wu general Zhou Ben was able to defeat and capture Wei, and when Wu forces then approached one of Wei's four prefectures, Ji Prefecture (吉州, in modern Ji'an, Jiangxi), Ji's prefect Peng Gan (彭玕) fled to Chu and submitted to Ma. Ma made Peng the prefect of one of his own prefectures, Chen Prefecture (郴州, in modern Chenzhou, Hunan), and, either at that time or later, had Ma Xifan marry Peng's daughter as his wife.

In 923, Later Liang was conquered by Later Tang. Ma Yin submitted to Later Tang as a vassal, and sent Ma Xifan to the Later Tang capital Luoyang to offer tributes. The Later Tang emperor Li Cunxu, both because he was impressed by Ma Xifan's alertness and intelligence, and because he wanted to try to alienate Ma Yin's trust in his chief strategist Gao Yu, made the comment, "I had long heard that the Ma state would be seized by Gao Yu. With a son like you, how could Gao steal the state?" (Ma Yin, however, was not swayed by this comment, and continued to trust Gao, although Gao would eventually be killed by Ma Xisheng in 929.)

In 928, Ma's erstwhile fellow vassal of Later Tang, Gao Jixing the ruler of Jingnan, had turned against Later Tang over territorial and material disputes, and Gao Jixing submitted instead to Wu as a vassal. Later Tang's emperor Li Siyuan (Li Cunxu's adoptive brother and successor) ordered Ma to attack Jingnan. Ma sent his major general Xu Dexun to do so, with Ma Xifan serving as Xu's army monitor. When the Chu army reached Shatou (沙頭, in modern Jingzhou, Hubei), it encountered the Jingnan army. Gao Jixing's nephew and officer Gao Congsi (高從嗣) personally went on the frontline and challenged Ma Xifan to a duel, offering to let their personal duel serve as a substitute for the battle between the armies. Ma Xifan apparently did not respond, but the Chu officer Liao Kuangqi (廖匡齊) stepped out and battled Gao Congsi, killing him. In fear, Gao Jixing sued for peace, and Xu withdrew.

By this point, Ma Yuan's sons were struggling among each other to become his successor. While Ma Xizhen would have been considered the legitimate heir under the traditional Chinese principles (as his mother was Ma Yin's wife and he was the oldest), Ma Yin eventually chose Ma Xisheng on the basis that Ma Xisheng's mother, Consort Yuan, was his favorite, and Ma Xisheng accepted the designation without at least showing some signs of willingness to yield. This drew resentment from both Ma Xifan and his mother Lady Chen, as Ma Xifan was born on the same day as Ma Xisheng. Ma Yin would die in 930, and Ma Xisheng succeeded him.

== Reign ==
=== During Later Tang ===
In 932, Ma Xisheng died. The officers, headed by Yuan Quan (袁詮) and Pan Yue (潘約), welcomed Ma Xifan, who then carried the title of military governor of Zhennan Circuit (鎮南, headquartered in modern Nanchang, Jiangxi—an honorary title, as at that time Zhennan was a Wu possession) and who was the defender of Lang Prefecture (朗州, in modern Changde, Hunan), to Changsha. Ma Xifan thereafter assumed the reins of the Chu state. Shortly after, Li Siyuan commissioned him the military governor of Wu'an, and gave him the honorary chancellor title Shizhong (侍中). In 933, Li Siyuan gave him the additional title of military governor of a new Wuping Circuit (武平, headquartered at Lang Prefecture)—thus establishing the Wuping command as subordinate but separate to the Wu'an command—as well as the honorary chancellor title Zhongshu Ling (中書令).

Through the years, Ma Xifan still bore grudges against Ma Xisheng and Consort Yuan for Ma Xisheng's failure to make any efforts to appear to be open to yield his heirship to other brothers. Once he came into power, he was disrespectful to Consort Yuan, and he often rebuked her younger son Ma Xiwang (馬希旺), who then served as a commander of the headquarters guards. Consort Yuan, fearful of what might happen to Ma Xiwang, offered to have him stripped of all titles and be made a Taoist monk. Ma Xifan declined, but stripped Ma Xiwang of his command, made him live in a bamboo house, and denied him permission to attend gatherings of the brothers. After Consort Yuan's death—implied to be in or shortly after 933—Ma Xiwang also died, in anger and fear.

In 934, Li Siyuan's son and successor Li Conghou created Ma Xifan the Prince of Chu.

Meanwhile, Ma Xifan's younger brother Ma Xigao (馬希杲), born of Lady Hua, had been serving as the military governor of Jingjiang Circuit (靜江, headquartered in modern Guilin, Guangxi), and governed the circuit well. However, Ma Xigao's army monitor Pei Renzhao (裴仁照) secretly submitted accusations to Ma Xifan that Ma Xigao was trying to ingratiate the people. This caused suspicion in Ma Xifan's mind. In summer 936, when Southern Han's general Sun Dewei (孫德威) intruded into Chu's Meng (蒙州, in modern Wuzhou, Guangxi) and Gui (桂州, Jingjiang's capital) Prefectures, Ma Xifan decided to leave his full younger brother Ma Xiguang temporarily in charge at Changsha, and he headed to the frontline himself with 5,000 soldiers. This caused Ma Xigao to become apprehensive. His mother Lady Hua decided to rendezvous with Ma Xifan at Mount Quanyi (全義嶺, in modern Guilin), and she stated, "Xigao ruled the circuit poorly, such that bandits [(i.e., the Southern Han army)] invaded and that Your Royal Highness had to climb over dangerous mountains. This is all the fault of your servant [(i.e., herself)]. I am willing to have you strip him of his land, and I am willing to be a cleaner in the palace, to pay for Xigao's crimes." Ma Xifan responded, "I have not seen Xigao for quite some time. I heard that his governance was exceptional, and therefore decided to come to see for myself." The Southern Han army soon withdrew, but Ma Xifan moved Ma Xigao to be the acting prefect of Lang.

=== During Later Jin ===
In 936, then-Later Tang emperor Li Congke (Li Siyuan's adoptive son) was overthrown by his brother-in-law Shi Jingtang, who established Later Jin with the support of the Khitan Liao Dynasty. Ma Xifan continued to be a vassal to Later Jin.

In 937, Shi gave Ma the additional titles of generalissimo of the circuits south of the Yangtze River (江南諸道都統, Jiangnan Zhudao Dutong) and overseer of the armies of Wuping and Jingjiang.

In 938, Ma's wife Lady Peng died. It was said that Lady Peng was ugly in appearance, but capable in governing the household; while she was alive, Ma was respectful and fearful of her. After she died, Ma became to indulged excessively in entertainment and licentiousness, spending much of his nights drinking. There was a time when he killed a merchant so that he could seize the merchant's beautiful wife, but the merchant's wife refused to accede to his designs on her, and committed suicide.

In 939, Shi bestowed on Ma the title of Tiance Shangjiangjun (天策上將軍, "Grand General of Heavenly Strategies")—a title formerly held by the great Tang emperor Emperor Taizong of Tang and his father Ma Yin. The bestowment included a seal bearing that title, and permission for him to establish a Tiance Office. Ma Xifan thus established a number of office titles within that office, which he bestowed on his brothers and officers. He also, imitating Emperor Taizong, commissioned 18 staff members to serve as scholars at the Tiance Office.

Also in 939, the non-Han tribal chief Peng Shichou (彭士愁), who carried the title of prefect of Xi Prefecture (溪州, in modern Xiangxi Tujia and Miao Autonomous Prefecture, Hunan), technically under the sovereignty of Chu's western neighbor Later Shu, attacked Chu's Chen (辰州, in modern Huaihua, Hunan, not the same prefecture that Ma's father-in-law Peng Gan once governed) and Li (澧州, in modern Changde) Prefectures, and sought reinforcements from Later Shu's emperor Meng Chang. Meng, believing that this campaign was too far from Later Shu proper, refused. Ma sent his generals Liu Qing (劉勍) and Liao Kuangqi against Peng Shichou. They were initially successful, forcing Peng to abandon Xi Prefecture and flee into the mountain caves. However, during the subsequent siege of the caves, Liao died in battle. When Ma sent an emissary to pay respects to Liao, Liao's mother, not crying, stated to his emissary, "The 300 people of the Liao clan were bestowed clothes and food by the Prince. Even if the entire clan were to die, we still cannot repay it, not to mention just one son. May the Prince not be bothered by this." Ma believed that Mother Liao was a wise woman, and richly rewarded her household for Liao Kuangqi's sacrifice. In 940, Liu was finally able to force Peng's submission. Ma relocated the seat for Xi Prefecture to somewhere with easier transportation, and recommissioned Peng as its prefect while commissioning Liu the prefect of Jin Prefecture (錦州, in modern Huaihua). It was said that from this point on, the non-Han of the region submitted to Chu rule. Meanwhile, Ma, claiming descent from the Han Dynasty general Ma Yuan, made a huge pillar of bronze, with inscriptions of mutual oaths of governance/submission on it, at Xi Prefecture.

In late 941, An Congjin, the Later Jin military governor of Shannan East Circuit (山南東道, headquartered in modern Xiangyang, Hubei), rebelled against Later Jin. Shi ordered that both Chu and Jingnan assist the operations of the imperial general Gao Xingzhou, whom he sent against An. Both Ma and Jingnan's prince Gao Conghui did so, with Ma sending the general Zhang Shaodi (張少敵) and supplying Gao Xingzhou's army with food.

By 942, Ma had built a grand building for the Tiance Office. It was said that even its window sills and thresholds were adorned with gold and jade, while its walls were painted with cinnabar. Its floors were covered with bamboo mats in the spring and summer, and Bombax ceiba threads in the fall and winter. By 943, it was said that Chu was so wealthy, and Ma's taste for luxury so great, such that he used gold to cover the spears for decoration such that they became useless as weapons. His expenditures were innumerable. He built a Jiulong Hall (九龍殿, "Nine Dragons Hall") with eight elaborate dragon statutes therein—i.e., being the ninth dragon himself. To pay for these expenses, he taxed the people heavily, and further sold political offices to merchants. He also encouraged people who committed crimes to pay fines or to carry out military service, in lieu of punishment, such that only the poor and the weak actually get punished. When his official Tuoba Heng (拓拔恆) tried to discourage him from this behavior, he refused to listen, causing Tuoba to lament and comment, "The Prince is excessive in his desires and refuses to listen to corrections. I see his clan's 1,000 people becoming vagrants with no home." Hearing of Tuoba's comment, Ma became incensed, and refused to see Tuoba for the rest of his life.

In 945, Ma again suspected Ma Xigao, then at Lang, of having drawn the favor of the people. He sent emissaries to monitor Ma Xigao. Ma Xigao, in fear, claimed illness and requested to leave his post to return to Changsha. Ma Xifan refused, and sent doctors to see Ma Xigao. The doctors, apparently at Ma Xifan's direction, poisoned Ma Xigao to death.

Knowing that Shi Jingtang's nephew and successor Shi Chonggui, who was emperor of Later Jin by this point, had a liking for precious items, Ma Xifan repeatedly offered such items in tribute to the emperor, and requested to be given the title of generalissimo of all circuits (諸道兵馬都元帥). Shi Chonggui bestowed that title on him in 946.

=== After Later Jin's fall ===
Meanwhile, Shi Chonggui had taken a confrontational posture against Liao Dynasty over the years, eventually leading Liao's Emperor Taizong to launch a major attack on Later Jin in 946, destroying it. Emperor Taizong entered the Later Jin capital Kaifeng, and claimed to also be the emperor of China. He sent an emissary to Chu, giving Ma Xifan the great title of Shangfu (尚父, "imperial father"). Ma was very pleased. (Eventually, though, facing Han resistance, Emperor Taizong withdrew, and died on the way back to Liao territory; Later Jin territory eventually came under the sovereignty of the Later Jin general Liu Zhiyuan, who claimed imperial title and founded Later Han, although this news never reached Ma Xifan.)

Over the years, Ma Xifan had greatly trusted his younger full brother Ma Xiguang, making him the deputy military governor of Wu'an, the commandant of the Tiance Office, and military governor of Zhennan, as well as making him in charge of the headquarters. In 947, Ma Xifan died suddenly. After deliberations between staff members, the majority wanted to support Ma Xiguang to succeed Ma Xifan—even though another brother, Ma Xi'e, who then carried the titles of military governor of Wuping and acting prefect of Yong Prefecture (永州, in modern Yongzhou, Hunan), was older, despite opposition from Tuoba Heng and Zhang Shaodi. Ma Xiguang thus was declared the new ruler, eventually precipitating a civil war between him and Ma Xi'e that would bring down the Chu state.

== Notes and references ==
- History of the Five Dynasties, vol. 133.
- New History of the Five Dynasties, vol. 66.
- Spring and Autumn Annals of the Ten Kingdoms, vol. 68.
- Zizhi Tongjian, vols. 267, 276, 278, 279, 280, 281, 282, 283, 284, 285, 287.

Chinese nobility
Preceded by Ma Xisheng	Ruler of Chu; 932–947	Succeeded by Ma Xiguang
Preceded by Ma Xisheng	Ruler of China (Southeastern Hunan/Northeastern Guangxi) (de facto); 932–947	Succeeded by Ma Xiguang
Preceded by Ma Xisheng	Ruler of China (Northwestern Hunan) (de facto); 932–947	Succeeded by Ma Xi'e (Prince Gongxiao)
