= Empress Dowager Wang (Yang Wu) =

Empress Dowager Wang (王太后, personal name unknown) (died 928) was a concubine of the late-Tang dynasty warlord Yang Xingmi and the mother of his son Yang Pu, the final ruler and the only emperor of the Wu state founded upon the territory that Yang Xingmi took. During Yang Pu's reign as emperor, she was honored as empress dowager.

== Background ==
Virtually nothing is known about Lady Wang's background, including when or where she was born. The only thing that was known about her early life is that she was the mother of Yang Xingmi's fourth son, Yang Pu.

== As queen dowager and empress dowager ==
In 920, Yang Pu's older half-brother, Yang Longyan (Yang Xingmi's second son), who was then the King of Wu, was gravely ill. While Yang Pu was not Yang Xingmi's oldest surviving son at that point (Yang Meng, Yang Xingmi's third son, was), Xu Wen, who was in effective control of Wu's government by that point, was apprehensive of Yang Meng, who had ambitions to restore the Yang family's effective power. Xu, therefore, claiming that it was Yang Longyan's wishes, welcomed Yang Pu, who was then the Duke of Danyang, to the palace and had Yang Pu take the title of regent. Yang Longyan died soon thereafter, and Yang Pu took the throne as King of Wu. He honored his mother Lady Wang as queen dowager.

In 927, after Xu's death, Yang Pu, pursuant to Xu's urging prior to his death, took the title of Emperor of Wu. He honored Queen Dowager Wang as empress dowager. She died the next year (928).
