= Consort Yuan (Ma Yin) =

Consort Yuan, regal consort title Defei (袁德妃, personal name unknown) was the favorite concubine of Ma Yin, the founding ruler of the Chinese Five Dynasties and Ten Kingdoms Period Chu state. One of her sons, Ma Xisheng, later succeeded Ma Yin.

== As Ma Yin's concubine ==
It is not known when Lady Yuan was born, or what her family origins were. As her son Ma Xisheng (Ma Yin's second son) was born in 899, she must have become Ma Yin's concubine prior to that point. In addition to Ma Xisheng, she had at least one younger son, Ma Xiwang (馬希旺). She was described as extremely beautiful and Ma Yin's favorite — although two other concubines, Lady Chen (who bore Ma Xifan — born on the same day as, but later than, Ma Xisheng — and Ma Xiguang) and Lady Hua (who bore Ma Xigao (馬希杲)), were also favored by him. At some point of his reign as the Prince, then King, of Chu, Lady Yuan received the regal consort title of Defei; she was the only one who, in historical accounts, was stated to have received a regal consort title.

Under traditional principles of succession, Ma Yin's first son Ma Xizhen (馬希振), who was born of his wife (whose name was not given in historical accounts), should have been his heir. However, because of the favor that Ma Yin had for Consort Yuan, he designated Ma Xisheng his heir, and Ma Xisheng made no efforts to even put up an appearance of willing to yield to other brothers. (Ma Xizhen, apparently to avoid a confrontation with Ma Xisheng, became a Taoist monk and departed from the court scene.) Ma Xisheng's failure to show any willingness to yield caused great resentment in both Lady Chen and Ma Xifan, and Lady Chen, from that point on, had a chilly relationship with Consort Yuan.

== After Ma Yin's death ==
Ma Yin died in 930, and Ma Xisheng succeeded him as the ruler of the state. Ma Xisheng, in turn, died in 932, and was succeeded by Ma Xifan. Still bearing resentment toward Ma Xisheng and Consort Yuan, it was said that Ma Xifan was not properly honoring Consort Yuan. At this time, Consort Yuan's younger son Ma Xiwang was serving as the commander of the headquarters guards. Ma Xifan found excuses to rebuke him frequently. Worried for Ma Xiwang's safety, Consort Yuan requested that Ma Xiwang be stripped of his titles and be allowed to become a Taoist monk. Ma Xifan refused, but stripped him of his military command, made him live in a bamboo house with a door made of straw, and forbid him from attending meetings of their brothers. After Consort Yuan died — which historical sources did not give a date for, but which the Zizhi Tongjian implied was in or shortly after 933 — Ma Xiwang, in fear and anger, also died.

== Notes and references ==
- Spring and Autumn Annals of the Ten Kingdoms, vol. 71.
- Zizhi Tongjian, vol. 278.
