= Zhang Yanhan =

Zhang Yanhan (張延翰) (884-January 6, 941), courtesy name Dehua (德華), was an official of the Chinese Five Dynasties and Ten Kingdoms Period states Wu (Ten Kingdoms) and Wu's successor state Southern Tang, serving as a chancellor late in Wu and early in Southern Tang.

== Background ==
Zhang Yanhan was born in 884. He was from Suiyang (睢陽, in modern Shangqiu, Henan), but little is stated about his family background in the traditional sources. Late during Tang, he served as the military advisor to the prefect of Shan Prefecture (陝州, in modern Sanmenxia, Henan). However, at one point, he took a leave to see his uncle Zhang Shensi (張慎思), who was then serving as the acting military governor of Ganhua Circuit (感化, headquartered in modern Xuzhou, Jiangsu). He informed Zhang Shensi his opinion that northern China was about to fall into complete chaos and that he wanted to head to the region between the Yangtze and Huai Rivers (which was then under the rule of the major warlord Yang Xingmi the military governor of Huainan Circuit (淮南, headquartered in modern Yangzhou, Jiangsu)), so that the family line could be extended. Zhang Shensi agreed with his analysis and sent him on his way.

== During Wu ==
Tang ended in 907, and the realm fractured into several states, with Yang Xingmi's domain, then ruled by his son and successor Yang Wo, becoming the state of Hongnong (later known as Wu). Zhang Yanhan initially served there as the magistrate of Yancheng County (鹽城, in modern Yancheng, Jiangsu), and was said to have been capable. He was later promoted to be the military commander of the army at Chu Prefecture (楚州, in modern Huai'an, Jiangsu).

In 918, when then-Wu regent Xu Wen's adoptive son Xu Zhigao became junior regent at Wu's capital Guangling (廣陵, in modern Yangzhou) (as Xu Wen himself was stationed at Sheng Prefecture (昇州, in modern Nanjing, Jiangsu)), Xu Zhigao was given the title of military prefect (團練使, Tuanlianshi) of Jiang Prefecture (江州, in modern Jiujiang, Jiangxi), but obviously could not govern Jiang himself from Guangling; therefore, he sent Zhang there, as his secretary, to actually govern the prefecture.

At a later point, Zhang returned to the Wu imperial government to serve as an imperial censor (殿中侍御史, Dianzhong Shi Yushi), and was put in charge, in an acting capacity, of the office of the imperial censors. At that time, the general Zhang Xuan (張宣) was one of the commanders of the guards for the capital Guangling, and was, due to his accomplishments, arrogant and violent. Zhang Yanhan submitted an indictment against Zhang Xuan, which caused other similarly arrogant generals to become apprehensive and to curb their behavior.

Zhang Yanhan was later promoted to be the deputy minister of rites (禮部侍郎, Libu Shilang). This caused him to appreciate Xu Zhigao (who was full regent by that point) greatly, as he had not previously been considered a close associate of the regent. At that time, Wu had not held imperial examinations — a Tang tradition for selecting officials for the imperial government; rather, it would be that people would be selected based on contents of petitions they submitted. Xu put Zhang in charge reinstituting the imperial examinations, and Zhang performed the task capably, paying attention to promoting the impoverished and not being intimidated by those with honored backgrounds, such that the administrators under him were respecting him as if he were a deity. After Xu Zhigao's son Xu Jingtong became junior regent in 930, Xu Jingtong was impressed with Zhang, and stated to others, "Mr. Zhang's opinions are fair and his decisions are well-reasoned. His listing of matters are detailed and clear. I should listen to him wholeheartedly." Zhang eventually was put in charge of overseeing all six ministries of the executive bureau of government (尚書省, Shangshu Sheng) and became respected by the people. When he was in his 50s, he was given the titles of Zhongshu Shilang (中書侍郎, deputy head of the legislative bureau (中書省, Zhongshu Sheng)) and Tong Zhongshu Menxia Pingzhangshi (同中書門下平章事), making him a chancellor. Even though he was by no means old, the people still commented at the time that it was regrettable that he was not chancellor earlier.

== During Southern Tang ==
In 937, Xu Zhigao had Yang Pu yield the throne to him, ending Wu and starting a new state of Southern Tang, with Xu as its emperor. (Xu would, in the following year, change his family name back to his birth name of Li and take on a new personal name of Bian.) He commissioned Zhang Yanhan, as well as fellow former Wu chancellors Zhang Juyong and Li Jianxun, chancellors of his new state.

It was said that some time thereafter, Zhang Yanhan fell ill. As Li Bian still hoped that Zhang would be able to serve as chancellor, he did not allow Zhang to resign, but rather repeatedly send emissaries to oversee his treatment and make sure that he was given the best medications. Despite this, Zhang died around the new year 941. He was given posthumous honors.

== Notes and references ==
- Spring and Autumn Annals of the Ten Kingdoms, vol. 21.
- Zizhi Tongjian, vols. 281, 282.
