= Ma Xisheng =

Ruler of Ma Chu from 930 to 932

Ma Xisheng 馬希聲
- Jiedushi of Wu'an & Jingjiang Circuits

Ruler of Ma Chu
- Tenure: December 19, 930 (Note: As Ma Xisheng never carried the title of "Prince" while alive, the date that he was described to have "assumed power" is used here.) – August 15, 932
- Predecessor: Ma Yin (King Wumu)
- Successor: Ma Xifan (Prince Wenzhao)

Jiedushi of Wu'an Circuit (武安軍節度使)
- Tenure: 930 – 932
- Predecessor: Ma Yin
- Successor: Ma Xifan
- Born: 899 (Note: Ma Xisheng's biographies in the New History of the Five Dynasties and the Spring and Autumn Annals of the Ten Kingdoms never actually gave his birth year, even indirectly. However, his brother and successor Ma Xifan's biography indicated Ma Xifan was 48 at his death in 947, and further indicated that Ma Xifan was born on the same day as Ma Xisheng, thus indicating what Ma Xisheng's birth year was, as well.); Likely Changsha
- Died: August 15, 932; Changsha
- Wife: Lady Yang
Names
- Mǎ Xīshēng (馬希聲)
Era dates
- None, used Later Tang's era name Changxing (長興).
Posthumous name
- None, known by posthumously created-title of Prince of Hengyang (衡陽王)
- House: Ma
- Dynasty: Ma Chu
- Father: Ma Yin
- Mother: Consort Yuan

Ma Xisheng
- Traditional Chinese: 馬希聲
- Simplified Chinese: 马希声
Transcriptions
Standard Mandarin
- Hanyu Pinyin: Mǎ Xīshēng
- Wade–Giles: Ma Hsi-shêng

Courtesy name Ma Ruona
- Traditional Chinese: 馬若訥
- Simplified Chinese: 马若讷
Transcriptions
Standard Mandarin
- Hanyu Pinyin: Mǎ Ruònè
- Wade–Giles: Ma Jo-nê

Title Prince of Hengyang
- Traditional Chinese: 衡陽王
- Simplified Chinese: 衡阳王
- Literal meaning: King/Prince of Hengyang
Transcriptions
Standard Mandarin
- Hanyu Pinyin: Héngyáng Wáng
- Wade–Giles: Hêng-yang Wang

Ma Xisheng (899 – 15 August 932), courtesy name Ruona and titled Prince of Hengyang, was the second ruler of the southern kingdom of Chu during the Five Dynasties and Ten Kingdoms Period of Chinese history, ruling briefly from his father's death in 930 to his own death in 932.

== Background ==
Ma Xisheng was born in 899, during the reign of Emperor Zhaozong of Tang, as the second son of the warlord Ma Yin. At that time, Ma Yin had just taken control of Tan Prefecture (in modern Changsha, Hunan) following the assassination of Ma Yin's predecessor Liu Jianfeng, and was not yet fully in control of Wu'an Circuit (武安, headquartered at Tan Prefecture), which would eventually become the central circuit for the Chu state, but was in the process of gradually consolidating his control. Ma Xisheng's mother Lady Yin, while Ma Yin's favorite, was not Ma Yin's wife — as Ma Yin's first son, Ma Xizhen (馬希振), was said to be born of his wife, who was not named in historical sources. (Ma Yin would eventually have at least 35 sons, and Consort Yuan bore at least one of those of Ma Xisheng's younger brothers, Ma Xiwang (馬希旺), although none of the eventual rulers of Chu subsequent to Ma Xisheng — Ma Xifan, Ma Xiguang, Ma Xi'e, and Ma Xichong — was likely born of her, with Ma Xifan and Ma Xiguang clearly born of a different concubine, Lady Chen.) Ma Xisheng and Ma Xifan were born on the same day, but Ma Xisheng was born earlier on that day. (Another brother, unnamed in historical sources, was likely born on the same day of a different mother, between Ma Xisheng's and Ma Xifan's births, as Ma Xifan was said to be Ma Yin's fourth son.)

== During Ma Yin's reign ==
Ma Yin, who gradually increased the size of his realm over the years, would eventually receive the title of Prince of Chu (楚王, Chu Wang) as the vassal of Tang's successor state Later Liang; he continued to carry that title as a vassal of Later Liang's successor state Later Tang, and later would be further created the King of Chu (楚國王, Chu Guowang) by Later Tang's second emperor Li Siyuan in 927. Apparently after being created king and therefore authorized to create a governmental structure of his own mirroring that of the imperial government, he, in 929, Ma Yin made Ma Xisheng, who then carried the titles of deputy military governor of Wu'an and acting mayor of Changsha, a chancellor with the designation Zhi Zhengshi (知政事), and also put him in charge of the military affairs of the state (總錄中外諸軍事, Zonglu Zhongwai Zhujunshi). It was said that from this point on, all affairs of the state have to first be reported to Ma Xisheng before Ma Yin, making it clear that Ma Xisheng was to be considered his successor. (Ma Xizhen, both because he was born of a wife and because he was older, would be considered the heir under the traditional rules of succession, but Ma Xisheng was said to be selected because Lady Yuan—who was then carrying the regal title of Defei (德妃) and who was the only one that traditional histories attributed a consort title to among Ma Yin's concubines—was Ma Yin's favorite. Ma Xizhen, apparently to avoid a confrontation with Ma Xisheng, became a Taoist monk and excused himself from the court scene.)

Shortly after taking effective control of the Chu administration, Ma Xisheng came to suspect Ma Yin's long-time strategist Gao Yu. Earlier, Gao Jixing, the ruler of Chu's northern neighbor Jingnan, sent a letter to Ma Xisheng, ostensibly to seek permission to allow him to enter into a blood brotherhood with Gao Yu. Ma Xisheng's suspicions were aroused, particularly since his wife Lady Yang's relative Yang Zhaosui (楊昭遂) had ambitions of replacing Gao Yu, and therefore often spoke negatively of Gao to him. Ma Xisheng thus accused Gao of wasteful living and contacting other states, requesting Ma Yin to kill him. Ma Yin refused, but after Ma Xisheng repeatedly requested to at least strip Gao Yu of military command, did so. Gao, displeased, stated to his associates, "I am going to build a mansion in the hills to the west, for retirement. The pony [(a double entendre, as Ma means "horse" in Chinese)] has grown up and can bite now." Ma Xisheng heard the remark and became angry—so angry that he falsely announced that Gao had committed treason, and he slaughtered Gao and his family, without first informing Ma Yin. When Ma Yin heard this, he cried bitterly, but did not punish Ma Xisheng.

In 930, Ma Yin, then very ill, sent an emissary to Li Siyuan's court, asking to be allowed to pass his titles to Ma Xisheng. The Later Tang imperial government, incorrectly, assumed that Ma Yin had already died, and therefore Li Siyuan issued an edict that Ma Xisheng suspend his mourning period (i.e., for Ma Yin's death) and serve as the military governor of Wu'an; the edict also gave Ma Xisheng the title of Palace Attendant, automatically conferring chancellor status. It was not, however, until a month later that Ma Yin actually died, and he left a will to his sons, stating that after his death, the further succession of the Chu state should be from brother to brother — going as far as leaving his sword displayed at the royal gathering hall and stating, "Those who resist my order shall be killed!" The Chu generals initially wanted to delay announcements of Ma Yin's death until they had had a chance to fortify the borders, but at the urging of Huang Sun (黃損) the deputy minister of defense, who pointed out that one ruler was being succeeded by another and that there should not be too much of a display of alarm, went ahead announced Ma Yin's death and Ma Xisheng's succession.

== Reign ==
After Ma Xisheng took over the Chu state, he stated that it was Ma Yin's will that he not claim the title of king (and therefore, not the right to the governmental structure as was given in the regal creation) but only claimed the title of military governor of Wu'an as a vassal to Later Tang. Li Siyuan subsequently gave him the additional title of military governor of Jingjiang Circuit (靜江, headquartered in modern Guilin, Guangxi, which Chu also controlled) as well as the status of director of the Legislative Bureau (中書令, Zhongshu ling), a position giving him chancellor status.

For reasons unclear, Ma Yin was not buried for about a year. During that period, while Ma Xisheng had been authorized by the Later Tang court not to observe a mourning period, traditionally he was considered to be still in that period. Nevertheless, having heard stories about Later Liang's founder Zhu Quanzhong's fondness for chicken, Ma Xisheng also took to eating chicken — which, while not absolutely prohibited to him, was considered inappropriate during a time of mourning — going as far as killing 50 chickens for food each day. He was also bearing no outward signs of sadness. As Ma Yin was set to be buried in late 931 at Hengyang, Ma Xisheng, who was to escort the funeral train departing Changsha, ate several plates of chicken before departing. His official Pan Qi (潘起), seeing this, satirized him by stating, "In the past, Ruan Ji ate pork when he was mourning. Every generation will have its wise men."

During Ma Xisheng's reign, there was apparently a severe drought in the Chu realm. Believing the gods to be responsible, he, in fall 932, ordered the closure of the temples dedicated to the god of Mount Heng as well as other gods, but the drought continued. He died not long after, and his generals supported Ma Xifan to succeed him.

== Notes ==
Chinese nobility
Preceded by Ma Yin (King Wumu)	Ruler of Chu; 930–932	Succeeded by Ma Xifan (Prince Wenzhao)
