= Gao Yu =

Military strategist (died 929)

Gao Yu (高郁; died 929) was a chief strategist for the Chinese Five Dynasties and Ten Kingdoms Chu state. He was said to be instrumental in the consolidation of power that allowed Chu's first ruler, Ma Yin, to find the Chu state, but was later, in Ma Yin's old age, hated by Ma Yin's son (and eventual successor) Ma Xisheng, who ordered him executed in 929 without prior approval from Ma Yin.

== Prior to Chu's founding ==
It is not known when Gao Yu was born, but it is known that he was from Yang Prefecture (揚州, in modern Yangzhou, Jiangsu). Historical records do not indicate how he became a follower of Ma Yin's, but as Ma, who was then a follower of Sun Ru, had fought under Sun during Sun's attempt to take over Huainan Circuit (淮南, headquartered at Yang Prefecture), Gao might have joined Ma's army then. In any case, by 896, when Ma had just been commissioned the acting military governor of Wu'an Circuit (武安, headquartered in modern Changsha, Hunan) (which would eventually form the foundation block for the Chu state) by then-reigning Emperor Zhaozong of Tang, Ma employed Gao as his chief strategist. That year, when Ma considered trying to elicit the good will of nearby warlords Cheng Rui the military governor (Jiedushi) of Jingnan Circuit (荊南, headquartered in modern Jingzhou, Hubei) and Yang Xingmi the military governor of Huainan (who had prevailed over Sun in the struggle for Huainan), by sending them gifts, Gao pointed out that Cheng lacked actual abilities and needed not be feared, and that given the enmity that had developed between Yang's and Ma's troops (as they had battled during Yang's and Sun's struggle for control of Huainan), any attempt at an alliance would be fruitless. Gao instead emphasized maintaining a good relationship with the imperial government, comforting the people, and training the troops. Ma agreed with these suggestions.

== During Chu ==
The Tang dynasty ended in 907, and the realm was divided between rival states. Ma Yin, who was then full military governor of Wu'an, was a vassal to Tang's main successor state, Later Liang; he was created the Prince of Chu by Later Liang's founding emperor Emperor Taizu, and his state was therefore known as Chu. Gao continued to serve as his chief strategist, and in 908 suggested allowing the people of Chu to sell tea leaves to the north (i.e., Later Liang proper) and collect taxes from the tea trade for military use. Ma agreed. He thus, with approval from Emperor Taizu, established tea trade offices at the Later Liang capital Daliang, as well as at Jing Prefecture (荊州, Jingnan's capital), Xiang Prefecture (襄州, in modern Xiangyang, Hubei), Tang Prefecture (唐州, in modern Zhumadian, Henan), Ying Prefecture (郢州, in modern Jingmen, Hubei), and Fu Prefecture (復州, in modern Tianmen, Hubei). Under this scheme, Chu tea would be shipped to the north and sold; the proceeds would be used to purchase silk and horses, which were lacking in the south. Part of the tea shipment was given to the Later Liang imperial government as tribute. It was said that under this scheme, Chu began to become a wealthy state.

Meanwhile, Ma encouraged commerce within the Chu state by not taxing commercial transactions. As a result, merchants from everywhere came to Chu to conduct their commerce. In order to take advantage of this phenomenon, Gao, as of 925, suggested to Ma that he mint coins out of two metals not usually used for minting—lead and iron. The Chu money would not be useful in other states, so the merchants were forced to purchase goods within Chu before leaving. This allowed Chu to be able to trade its goods for goods that it lacked, allowing it to become even wealthier.

Over the years, Ma continued to trust Gao's advice, and the other states despised Gao's abilities. After Later Liang was destroyed by Later Tang in 923, Ma became a vassal of Later Tang, and sent his son Ma Xifan to pay tribute to Later Tang's Emperor Zhuangzong. Emperor Zhuangzong, while praising Ma Xifan for his intelligence and alertness, chose to try to sow the seeds of dissension by stating, "I had long heard that the Ma state would be seized by Gao Yu. With a son like you, how could Gao steal the state?" Gao Jixing, who by 929 was the ruler of a separate state of Jingnan to Chu's north, also tried to create suspicions by spreading rumors against Gao Yu, but Ma Yin paid no heed to these rumors. Gao Jixing then sent a letter to Ma's second eldest son Ma Xisheng, whom Ma Yin had by that point put in control of most affairs of the Chu state, ostensibly to seek permission to allow him to enter into a blood brotherhood with Gao Yu. Ma Xisheng's suspicions were aroused, particularly since his wife's relative Yang Zhaosui (楊昭遂) had ambitions of replacing Gao Yu, and therefore often spoke negatively of Gao Yu to him. Ma Xisheng thus accused Gao Yu of wasteful living and contacting other states, requesting Ma Yin to kill him. Ma Yin refused, but after Ma Xisheng repeatedly requested to at least strip Gao Yu of military command, did so. Gao Yu, displeased, stated to his associates, "I am going to build a mansion in the hills to the west, for retirement. The pony [(a double entendre, as Ma means "horse" in Chinese)] has grown up and can bite now." Ma Xisheng heard the remark and became angry—so angry that he falsely announced that Gao had committed treason, and he slaughtered Gao and his family, without first informing Ma Yin. When Ma Yin heard this, he cried bitterly, but did not punish Ma Xisheng.

== Notes and references ==
- Zizhi Tongjian, vols. 260, 266, 274, 276.
- Spring and Autumn Annals of the Ten Kingdoms (十國春秋), vol. 72.
