= Yang Meng =

Yang Meng (楊濛) (died 937), courtesy name Zhilong (志龍), formally Prince Ling of Linjiang (臨江靈王), was an imperial prince of the Chinese Five Dynasties and Ten Kingdoms period state Wu. In 937, believing that the regent Xu Zhigao was about to seize the throne from his younger brother, then-reigning emperor Yang Pu, Yang Meng tried to start an insurrection against Xu, but was quickly captured and executed.

== Background ==
Yang Meng was the third son of Yang Xingmi, a major warlord at the end of Tang dynasty as the military governor (Jiedushi) of Huainan Circuit (淮南, headquartered in modern Yangzhou, Jiangsu). It is not known when he was born, although his immediately older brother Yang Longyan was born in 897 and his immediately younger brother Yang Pu was born in 900, placing a timeframe on his birth date. His mother's name was not recorded in history.

== During Yang Longyan's reign ==
The first historical reference to Yang Meng was in 919, when Yang Longyan had just declared himself the King of Wu, a kingdom derived from the domains that Yang Xingmi conquered at the end of Tang. Yang Longyan created his younger brothers and his only known son Yang Fen (楊玢) dukes — in Yang Meng's case, the Duke of Lujiang. It was said that Yang Meng was talented, and he often lamented the state of the affairs in Wu, which then was in effect controlled by the regent Xu Wen, stating, "It is the state of my family's; is it all right for it to be taken over by others?" Xu heard of his remarks and was displeased at them. Shortly after, Xu had him sent out of the capital Guangling to serve as the military prefect (團練使, Tuanlianshi) of Chu Prefecture (楚州, in modern Huai'an, Jiangsu).

In 920, Yang Longyan grew deathly ill. While Yang Meng was his oldest younger brother, Xu disliked Yang Meng and did not want him to succeed Yang Longyan, so he instead issued an order in Yang Longyan's name formally naming Yang Pu regent. When Yang Longyan subsequently died, Yang Pu took the throne as the King of Wu, while Yang Meng was moved from Chu Prefecture to serve as the military prefect of Shu Prefecture (舒州, in modern Huangshan, Anhui).

== During Yang Pu's reign ==
In 927, by which time Xu Wen had died and been succeeded as regent by his adoptive son Xu Zhigao, Yang Pu, pursuant to advice that Xu Wen left, declared himself the Emperor of Wu. He created Yang Meng the Prince of Changshan. In 928, Yang Meng's title was changed to Prince of Linchuan.

Yang Meng was known to be close to his brother-in-law, the general Jiang Yanhui (蔣延徽), who had married one of his sisters. It was because of this close relationship that, in 934, when Jiang was sieging Jian Prefecture (建州, in modern Nanping, Fujian), an important city held by Wu's southeastern neighbor Min, that Xu Zhigao became concerned that if Jiang were successful in capturing Jian Prefecture, he might use it as a base and support Yang Meng to take over power, and therefore ordered Jiang to withdraw.

By 934, Yang Meng was carrying, in addition to the title of Prince of Linchuan, the honorary chancellor title of Zhongshu Ling (中書令) and military governor of Zhaowu Circuit (昭武, headquartered in modern Fuzhou, Jiangxi). By that point, Xu was considering taking over the throne, and he was apprehensive that Yang Meng might interfere with his plans, and therefore had others submit false accusations that Yang Meng was sheltering criminals and making weapons. Yang Pu issued an edict demoting Yang Meng to the rank of Duke of Liyang, and had him put under house arrest at He Prefecture (和州, in modern Hefei, Anhui). The officer Wang Hong (王宏) was sent with 200 guards to guard Yang Meng.

By 937, it was becoming clear that Xu was about to get Yang Pu to yield the throne to him, as he, who by that point had been created the Prince of Qi, was taking on imperial trappings. Yang Meng decided to take one final attempt to stop the transition. In fall 937, he assassinated Wang Hong, and when Wang Hong's son led the guards to try to attack him, he killed Wang Hong's son with an arrow. He took two guards who were loyal to him and fled to Lu Prefecture (廬州, in modern Hefei, Anhui), as Zhou Ben the military governor of Desheng Circuit (德勝, headquartered at Lu Prefecture) was a senior general who had served under Yang Xingmi, and Yang Meng was hopeful that he might support Yang Meng's efforts. When he arrived at Lu Prefecture, however, Zhou's son Zhou Hongzuo (周弘祚) closed off the mansion and did not allow Zhou Ben to see Yang Meng, while sending guards out to capture Yang Meng. He then delivered Yang Meng toward Guangling, but Xu sent an imperial messenger with an edict in Yang Pu's name, intercepted Yang Meng at Caishi (采石, in modern Ma'anshan, Anhui), and killed him there.

Yang Meng was posthumously demoted to commoner rank. Meanwhile, the officer Guo Cong (郭悰) slaughtered Yang Meng's wife and children. Xu, claiming that this slaughter was unauthorized, had Guo exiled. Later in the year, after Xu had Yang Pu yield the throne to him, ending Wu and starting Southern Tang as its emperor, he posthumously rehonored Yang Meng as the Prince of Linchuan and had him buried with proper ceremony.

== Notes and references ==
- Spring and Autumn Annals of the Ten Kingdoms (十國春秋), vol. 4.
- Zizhi Tongjian, vols. 270, 271, 276, 278, 279, 281.
