= Empress Wang (Yang Pu) =

Empress Wang (王皇后, personal name unknown), known as Empress Rang (讓皇后, "empress of the emperor who yielded") during Southern Tang, was the wife and empress of Yang Pu (Emperor Rui), the final ruler of the Chinese Five Dynasties and Ten Kingdoms period state Wu. As he was the only ruler who claimed the title of emperor, she was the only person to carry the title of empress during Wu.

Very little is known about her. It is known that she initially carried the imperial consort title of Defei (德妃). In fall 933, Yang Pu created her empress. It is not known whether any of his known children were born of her. After he yielded the throne to the powerful regent Xu Gao in 937, he was subsequently moved out of the Wu palace at the Wu capital Jiangdu (江都, in modern Yangzhou, Jiangsu) into a heavily guarded Danyang Palace (丹陽宮) at Run Prefecture (潤州, in modern Zhenjiang, Jiangsu), and subsequently died there, it was said that it was not known what happened to her.

== Notes and references ==
Chinese nobility
Preceded by None (dynasty founded)	Empress of Wu; 933–937	Succeeded by None (dynasty destroyed)
Preceded by Empress He of the Tang dynasty	Emperor of China (Anhui/Jiangsu/Jiangxi/Eastern Hubei); 933–937	Succeeded by Empress Song of Southern Tang
