= Zhong Kuangshi =

Zhong Kuangshi (鍾匡時) was a warlord late in the Chinese dynasty Tang dynasty, who briefly controlled Zhennan Circuit (鎮南, headquartered in modern Nanchang, Jiangxi) after the death of his father Zhong Chuan, who had ruled the circuit for 20 years. Shortly after Zhong Kuangshi's takeover, rival warlord Yang Wo the military governor of Huainan Circuit (淮南, headquartered in modern Yangzhou, Jiangsu) defeated and captured Zhong, taking Zhennan under his control.

== During Zhong Chuan's rule ==
It is not known when Zhong Kuangshi was born. His father Zhong Chuan, who had already taken over Zhennan Circuit sometime earlier, was officially commissioned the military governor (jiedushi) of Zhennan in 882. The first historical reference to Zhong Kuangshi was in 901, when Zhong Chuan attacked Wei Quanfeng the prefect of Fu Prefecture (撫州, in modern Fuzhou, Jiangxi) and put Fu Prefecture under siege. When Wei subsequently agreed to follow Zhong Chuan's commands and sued for peace, Wei gave a daughter in marriage to Zhong Kuangshi to seal the peace.

== Brief rule ==
Zhong Chuan died in 906. The soldiers supported Zhong Kuangshi to succeed him, and Zhong Kuangshi took the title of acting military governor. Meanwhile, Zhong Chuan's adoptive son Zhong Yangui (鍾延規), who served as the prefect of Jiang Prefecture (江州, in modern Jiujiang, Jiangxi), was angry that he could not succeed Zhong Chuan, and therefore send emissaries to submit to Yang Wo the military governor of Huainan Circuit. Yang Wo took this chance to commission his general Qin Pei (秦裴) to attack Zhennan. Qin defeated and captured Zhong's officer Liu Chu (劉楚), and then put Zhennan's capital Hong Prefecture (洪州) under siege. He soon captured it and took Zhong Kuangshi and Zhong Kuangshi's military advisor Chen Xiang, as well as 5,000 soldiers, captive, and delivered them to Huainan's capital Yang Prefecture (揚州). Yang assumed the title of military governor of Zhennan himself, while commissioning Qin as the overseer of Hong Prefecture.

Once Zhong and Chen were delivered to Yang Prefecture, Yang rebuked Zhong for not submitting earlier. Zhong bowed and begged death. Yang took mercy on him and spared him, while executing Chen. It is not known what occurred to Zhong later, or when he died.

== Notes and references ==
- New Book of Tang, vol. 190.
- History of the Five Dynasties, vol. 17.
- New History of the Five Dynasties, vol. 41.
- Zizhi Tongjian, vols. 262, 265.
