= Wei Quanfeng =

Wei Quanfeng (危全諷) was a warlord late in the Chinese Tang dynasty who controlled Fu Prefecture (撫州, in modern Fuzhou, Jiangxi) for over two decades, from 882 to 909, and who, at the prime of his power, also controlled three nearby prefectures. After the destruction of Tang, he held the territory for some time, but in 909 was defeated by armies of the new state of Hongnong, and his territory was seized by Hongnong.

== Background and seizure of Fu Prefecture ==
Little is known about Wei Quanfeng's background, including when he was born, as he had no biography in the two official histories of the Tang dynasty—the Old Book of Tang and the New Book of Tang—or the two official histories of the succeeding Five Dynasties and Ten Kingdoms period—the History of the Five Dynasties and the New History of the Five Dynasties. It is known, however, that he was from Nancheng (南城, in modern Fuzhou, Jiangxi) and that he was leader of the local people. In 882, when another local leader, Zhong Chuan, who had been occupying Fu Prefecture, which Nancheng belonged to, captured Hong Prefecture (洪州, in modern Nanchang, Jiangxi) and was subsequently commissioned by Emperor Xizong of Tang as the governor (觀察使, Guanchashi) of Jiangxi Circuit (江西, headquartered at Hong Prefecture), Zhong left Fu Prefecture and Wei took the opportunity to take it over. Wei also sent his brother Wei Zaichang (危仔倡) to take over nearby Xin Prefecture (信州, in modern Shangrao, Jiangxi).

== Submission to Zhong Chuan ==
In 901, Zhong Chuan, who by that point was military governor (jiedushi) of Zhennan Circuit (鎮南, i.e., Jiangxi), attacked Wei Quanfeng at Fu Prefecture. During the siege, there was a sudden fire that occurred within the city. His officers suggested that he use this opportunity to attack. Zhong responded, "It is not gracious to attack while the enemy is in danger." He further prayed, "When Wei Quanfeng is being punished, may it be that the people are not." After the fire was put out, Wei heard of what Zhong did, and sent messengers to apologize to Zhong and offer to give a daughter in marriage to Zhong's son Zhong Kuangshi. He subsequently came under at least nominal allegiance to Zhong Chuan.

In 906, Zhong Chuan died, and the Zhennan soldiers initially supported Zhong Kuangshi to succeed him. However, Zhong Chuan's adoptive son Zhong Yangui (鍾延規) resented the soldiers' failure to support him and instead submitted to Yang Wo, the military governor of the neighboring Huainan Circuit (淮南, headquartered in modern Yangzhou, Jiangsu). Subsequently, Yang's general Qin Pei (秦裴) defeated and captured Zhong Kuangshi, allowing Yang to take over the Zhongs' territory. Yang himself assumed the additional title of military governor of Zhennan, although it is not clear whether Wei initially agreed to submit to Yang or not.

== After Zhong Kuangshi's destruction ==
As of 909, by which time the Tang dynasty had fallen and the Tang empire had broken up into a number of succeeding states, Huainan, which now was a new state of Hongnong, was ruled by Yang Wo's brother and successor Yang Longyan. That year, Wei Quanfeng, who by that point controlled not only Fu and Xin but also Yuan (袁州, in modern Yichun, Jiangxi) and Ji (吉州, in modern Ji'an, Jiangxi) Prefectures, mobilized the forces of the four prefectures (which he claimed to be 100,000 in number), claimed the title of military governor of Zhennan, and launched an attack on Hong Prefecture. The army of Hongnong military governor of Zhennan, Liu Wei, was grossly outnumbered (as Liu had only 1,000 men). Liu submitted secret requests for emergency assistance to Yang Longyan, but meanwhile pretended to be not concerned and continued to feast daily. Wei, hearing what Liu was doing, hesitated and stopped his army at Xiangya Lake (象牙潭, in modern Nanchang). Wei sought assistance from Ma Yin, the prince of the Chu state to the west. Ma sent his officer Wan Mei (苑玫) to rendezvous with Wei's subordinate Peng Yanzhang (彭彥章) the prefect of Yuan Prefecture, and Wan and Peng put the Hongnong city of Gao'an (高安, in modern Yichun) under siege, to assist Wei.

In reaction to Wei's and Ma's attacks, the Hongnong regent Xu Wen commissioned the general Zhou Ben to command the army against Wei. Zhou, opining that all Ma wanted to do was to assist Wei and not truly to capture Gao'an, decided to ignore the siege on Gao'an and head directly for Xiangya Lake to engage Wei. When he arrived, he camped across a river from Wei, and enticed Wei to attack by sending out his weaker soldiers first. Wei's army crossed the river to attack Zhou's soldiers; as it was doing so, Zhou attacked and defeated it, with many of Wei's soldiers trampling each other to death or drowning in the lake. Zhou captured Wei, and then attacked Yuan and captured Peng as well. Subsequently, Wei Zaichang fled to Wuyue, and the remaining parts of Wei Quanfeng's domain into Hongnong control as well.

Wei Quanfeng was delivered to the Hongnong capital Guangling (廣陵). Because Wei had, decades ago, provided Yang Longyan's father Yang Xingmi with food supplies when Yang Xingmi was taking over Xuanshe Circuit (宣歙, headquartered in modern Xuancheng, Anhui), Yang Longyan released Wei and gave him much treasure. It is not known when Wei died.
