= Yang Pu =

Emperor of Wu from 927 to 937

Emperor Rui of Yang Wu 楊吳睿帝

Emperor of Wu
- Reign: November 29, 927 – November 10, 937
- Predecessor: Proclaimed the emperor
- Successor: Dynasty abolished
- Regent: Xu Zhigao

Prince of Wu
- Reign: July 7, 920 – November 29, 927
- Predecessor: Yang Longyan
- Successor: Proclaimed the emperor
- Regent: Xu Wen
- Born: 900
- Died: January 21, 939 (Aged 38-39)
- Burial: Ping Mausoleum (平陵; presumptively in modern Yizheng, Jiangsu)
Full name
- Family name: Yáng (楊); Given name: Pǔ (溥)
Era dates
- Wǔyì (武義) 921–922 (inherited from Yang Longyan); Shùnyì (順義) 921–927; Qiánzhēn (乾貞) 927–929; Dàhé (大和) 929–935; Tiānzuò (天祚) 935–937
Regnal name
- Emperor Gaoshang Sixuan Honggu Rang (高尚思玄弘古讓皇帝)
Posthumous name
- Emperor Rui (睿皇帝, "intelligent")
- House: Yang
- Dynasty: Yang Wu

Yang Pu (Chinese: 楊溥; 900 – January 21, 939), also known by his posthumous name as the Emperor Rui of Yang Wu (楊吳睿帝), (Note: also known by his regnal name as the Emperor Gaoshang Sixuan Honggu Rang (高尚思玄弘古讓皇(帝), abbr. Emperor Rang, 讓皇, lit. 'the emperor who yielded') following the establishment of Southern Tang) was the last ruler of China's Yang Wu dynasty during the Five Dynasties and Ten Kingdoms period, and the only one that claimed the title of emperor. During his reign, the state was in effective control of the regents Xu Wen and Xu Wen's adopted son and successor Xu Zhigao (Li Bian). In 938, Xu Zhigao forced Yang Pu to yield the throne to him. Xu Zhigao then established the Southern Tang dynasty.

== Background ==
Yang Pu was born in 900, during the reign of Emperor Zhaozong of Tang, as the fourth son of the major late-Tang warlord Yang Xingmi the military governor (Jiedushi) of Huainan Circuit (淮南, headquartered in modern Yangzhou, Jiangsu), whose domain would become Wu eventually. His mother was Yang Xingmi's concubine Lady Wang. In 919, during the reign of his older brother Yang Longyan (King Xuan, Yang Xingmi's second son, who in turn succeeded another older brother, Yang Wo (Prince Wei of Hongnong)), Yang Pu was created the Duke of Danyang.

In 920, Yang Longyan fell ill, and the regent Xu Wen, who was effectively the ruler of the Wu government, arrived at the capital Jiangdu (江都, i.e., modern Yangzhou) to discuss with the officials there (including his adopted son, the junior regent Xu Zhigao) how to deal with the situation. Some of Xu Wen's followers encouraged him to take the throne himself. Xu, however, disavowing any such intent, proclaimed that he would surely find another son of the Yangs to succeed Yang Longyan. However, as he had long been apprehensive about Yang Xingmi's third son Yang Meng the Duke of Lujiang, who had long lamented Xu Wen's hold on the Wu governance, he did not wish to have Yang Meng succeed Yang Longyan. Instead, he issued an order in Yang Longyan's name, summoning Yang Pu to Jiangdu to serve as regent and moving Yang Meng to serve as the military prefect of Shu Prefecture (舒州, in modern Huangshan, Anhui). Yang Longyan died shortly after, and Yang Pu took the throne as King of Wu. He honored his mother Lady Wang as queen dowager.

== As King of Wu ==
In 921, Yang Pu, at Xu Wen's urging, formally sacrificed to heaven and earth, signifying his claim to the Mandate of Heaven. (Other officials tried to dissuade Xu, pointing out the high expenses of sacrificing to heaven and earth during Tang Dynasty, but Xu pointed out that Tang's ceremonies were overly wasteful and that proper ceremonies could be carried out without incurring the same high expenses that Tang expended.)

In 923, Wu's nominal ally Later Tang's emperor Emperor Zhuangzong (Li Cunxu), in his campaign against their joint enemy Later Liang, had just captured the strategically important city of Yun Prefecture (鄆州, in modern Tai'an, Shandong), and he personally wrote to Yang Pu, asking for the two states to jointly attack Later Liang. However, by this point, Wu was beginning to see Later Tang as a threat as well, and Xu considered sending a fleet north, and using it to aid whichever side prevailed. The official Yan Keqiu pointed out that he would have no good excuse not to commit to a position if Later Liang then requested aid as well, and so Xu did not launch the fleet.

Later in the year, Emperor Zhuangzong, in a surprise attack, captured the Later Liang capital Daliang. Later Liang's emperor Zhu Zhen committed suicide before the city fell, ending Later Liang, and Later Tang took over Later Liang's territory. Xu, in fear of what the Later Tang emperor might do next, blamed Yan for dissuading him from sending the fleet, but Yan pointed out that Emperor Zhuangzong had become arrogant in his victory and was not ruling his state well, predicting that within a few years his state would be in turmoil. Meanwhile, Later Tang's emissary to Wu initially delivered an edict from Emperor Zhuangzong, but Wu, not viewing itself as a Later Tang subject, refused to accept it. Emperor Zhuangzong rewrote his communication as a letter (thus showing equality between the states), but slightly displayed superiority by addressing the letter, "The letter from the Emperor of the Great Tang to the Lord of Wu." Yang Pu responded, also with a letter (thus also showing equality) but also showed deference by addressing the letter, "The respectful letter from the Lord of the Great Wu to the Emperor of the Great Tang." Shortly after, he also sent the official Lu Ping (盧蘋) as an emissary to Later Tang. Upon Lu's return, he confirmed Yan's observations – that Emperor Zhuangzong was wasting his time on tours and games, and was stingy with his funds, not willing to dispense them to soldiers, and thus causing discontent.

While Xu was in firm control of the Wu governance, in 924 Yang Pu was able to show some measure of sovereignty. At that time, there was an occasion when went to the port of Baisha (白沙, in modern Yangzhou) to review the fleet, and he changed Baisha's name to Yingluan Base (迎鑾, "Base that Welcomed the Emperor's Train"). Xu, who was then stationed at Jinling with Xu Zhigao at Jiangdu overseeing the government on his behalf, came to pay homage to him, and Yang Pu used this chance to complain about Xu's associate Zhai Qian (翟虔), whom Xu had put in control of the palace, as Zhai had put much restrictions on the King's movements and was spying on the King's moves. (Yang initiated the complaint by intentionally referring to rain (雨, yu) as "water" (水, shui), as Zhai's father's name was Zhai Yu, and Yang claimed that he, even as sovereign, felt so intimidated by Zhai that he had to observe naming taboo for Zhai's father.) Xu, realizing Yang's complaint, bowed and offered to put Zhai to death, but Yang stated that that was unnecessary but that an exile would be sufficient, so Xu exiled Zhai to Fu Prefecture (撫州, in modern Fuzhou, Jiangxi).

In 925, Qian Liu, the king of Wu's southeastern neighbor Wuyue (formally a vassal of Later Tang's), sent an emissary to Wu to inform Wu that he had been created the King of Wuyue by Emperor Zhuangzong. Wu, under the rationale that Wuyue was having designs on its own territory by accepting a title that included "Wu" in its name, refused to receive the emissary, and further cut off diplomatic and trade relations with Wuyue.

In 926, Emperor Zhuangzong was killed in a mutiny at the Later Tang capital Luoyang. His adoptive brother Li Siyuan, who led another mutiny and who shortly after arrived at Luoyang, declared himself emperor (as Emperor Mingzong) to succeed him. Yang sent an emissary to him to establish friendly relations (and offering fresh tea leaves as a tribute), but also internally declared a period for Emperor Zhuangzong.

In 927 there was an incident when the senior general Chai Zaiyong (柴再用) came to pay homage to the emperor, but was wearing his armor – which was inappropriate, and he was indicted by an imperial censor. Chai, however, citing his battlefield accomplishments, refused to accept the punishment. However, Xu Zhigao then tried to restore discipline by intentionally "accidentally" intruding into the palace, and then immediately withdrawing and submitting a petition asking to be punished for this intrusion. Yang issued an edict declining any punishment, but Xu Zhigao insisted on being punished by being stripped of one month's salary. It was said that this move restored discipline among the Wu officials.

Meanwhile, as the years went by, Xu Wen's biological son Xu Zhixun was repeatedly trying to persuade Xu Wen to have him replace Xu Zhigao as the overseer of the Wu government, and Xu Wen's associates Yan and Xu Jie were advocating the same, but Xu Wen was hesitant because Xu Zhigao was filially pious and careful, and his concubine Lady Chen also argued against it, pointing out that Xu Zhigao had been a son to him ever since the time that he was of low position, and should not now be abandoned. However, by late 927 he had resolved to do so, so he was preparing to go to Jiangdu from Jinling to urge Yang Pu to declare himself as emperor, and then use that opportunity to reassign both Xu Zhixun and Xu Zhigao. As he was about to depart Jinling, however, he became ill, and so he sent Xu Zhixun in his stead. Xu Zhigao, hearing the news, prepared to resign and request the post of military governor of Zhennan Circuit (鎮南, headquartered in modern Nanchang, Jiangxi), but while Xu Zhixun was on the way, Xu Wen died. Xu Zhixun rushed back to Jinling to take care of the aftermaths of his father's death, and Xu Zhigao remained as junior regent. Yang posthumously created Xu Wen the Prince of Qi.

Shortly after, pursuant to Xu Wen's last wishes, Yang declared himself emperor. He posthumously honored his father Yang Xingmi and brothers Yang Wo and Yang Longyan emperors as well. Hearing the news, Emperor Mingzong's chief of staff An Chonghui advocated a campaign against Wu, but Emperor Mingzong declined.

== As Emperor of Wu ==
=== Early reign as emperor ===
Yang Pu, after taking imperial title, honored his mother Queen Dowager Wang as empress dowager. He also created his brothers, his sons, and Yang Longyan's son Yang Fen (楊玢) imperial princes.

After Xu Wen's death, his offices were divided between Xu Zhigao and Xu Zhixun, but the brothers' continued to be rivals, with Xu Zhigao in control of the imperial government at Jiangdu and Xu Zhixun in control of Wu's largest army at Jinling. In winter 929, Xu Zhigao tricked Xu Zhixun into coming to Jiangdu to defend himself against charges of impropriety, and detained him once he was at Jiangdu. He took over the command of Xu Zhixun's army, thus consolidating power into his own hands.

In 930, Yang Pu created his oldest son Yang Lian, whom he had previously created the Prince of Jiangdu, crown prince. Also in 930, Xu Zhigao left Jiangdu and took the defense post at Jinling but continued to serve as regent (as his father Xu Wen did), leaving his son Xu Jingtong at Jiangdu to serve as junior regent, assisted by Wang Lingmou and Song Qiqiu.

=== Late reign as emperor ===
In 933, Song Qiqiu advocated that Wu's capital be moved from Jiangdu to Jinling. Xu Zhigao thereafter began to build palaces there. He also built a mansion for himself, preparing to welcome Yang Pu to Jinling. (The project was eventually abandoned in 934 when Xu Zhigao's associate Zhou Zong pointed out that given the importance of both Jinling and Jiangdu, if the Wu capital were moved to Jinling, Xu Zhigao himself would have to head to Jiangdu to take up post there, which would merely mean additional expense, and that this capital movement lacked popular support.)

Also in 933, Yang Pu created his wife Consort Wang, who had previously carried the title of Defei (德妃), empress. Shortly after, there was an incident where Later Tang's emissary to Wuyue, Zhang Wenbao (張文寶), who was going by the sea route to Wuyue, suffered a shipwreck, and his lifeboat, on which only five of his delegation of 200 survived, floated all the way into Wu territory, to Tianchang (天長, in modern Chuzhou, Anhui), where they were taken by Wu forces. Yang treated Zhang and the other survivors well, giving him gifts and also notified Wuyue to send a delegation to receive Zhang and his followers on Wu and Wuyue's border. Zhang, however, would only accept food and not the other gifts, stating, "My government had long not had communications with Wu. We are not subject and lord, nor are we guest and host. If I accept the gifts, what can I give in return?" Yang much appreciated his honesty.

Meanwhile, Xu Zhigao had long had designs on the throne himself, but as Yang Pu was considered virtuous and without fault, he initially decided to wait until after Yang Pu's reign to take the throne, and this plan was agreed with by his chief strategist Song. However, one day, when Xu was in Zhou Zong's presence, he, as he plucked white facial hair, stated, "The state is safe, but I am getting old." Zhou knew that Xu was getting impatient, and therefore volunteered to head to Jiangdu to hint the matter to the emperor and Song. Song was surprised that Zhou would be the one, not he, who would be consulted on this matter, and headed to Jinling himself and tried to dissuade Xu, and he further asked that Zhou be executed as an apology to the emperor. Xu, surprised by Song's opposition but not wishing to push the matter at the moment, exiled Zhou. (However, later, when Li Jianxun and Xu Jie also advocated that Xu Zhigao took the throne, Xu Zhigao recalled Zhou and distanced himself from Song.) Later in 934, Yang issued an edict bestowing the great honors of Grand Chancellor (大丞相, Da Chengxiang), Shangfu ("imperial father"), and Prince of Qi on Xu Zhigao, and also prepared to bestow the nine bestowments on him. Xu declined these honors.

Xu's preparations for taking the throne continued, however. As he feared that Yang Meng would rise against him, he had others accuse Yang Meng of hosting criminals and hoarding weapons, and had Yang Meng demoted to the rank of duke and had him put under house arrest at He Prefecture (和州, in modern Hefei, Anhui). He also summoned Xu Jingtong back to Jinling to serve as his deputy, while sending another son, Xu Jingqian (徐景遷), to Jiangdu to oversee the government. In winter 935, when Yang again issued an edict granting Xu Zhigao the titles of Shangfu, Taishi (太師), Grand Chancellor, Generalissimo (大元帥, Da Yuanshuai), and Prince of Qi, carving 10 prefectures out of Wu territory to constitute the Principality of Qi. Xu accepted the Prince of Qi, Taishi, and Generalissimo titles at that time, declining the Shangfu and Grand Chancellor titles.

In summer 936, due to Xu Jingqian's suffering from an illness, Yang relieved him from his posts; the posts, as well as the responsibility of overseeing the Wu government, were given to his brother Xu Jingsui. (Xu Jingqian would die of his illness in spring 937.) In winter 936, Yang formally permitted Xu's Principality of Qi to maintain all the governmental offices that an imperial government would have, and declared Jinling the western capital. (Xu Zhigao implemented this edict in spring 937, and also renamed himself Xu Gao.)

In fall 937, Yang Meng, believing that Xu Gao was about to take the throne, decided to take one last chance to save Wu. He assassinated the commander of the guard corps left to guard him, Wang Hong (王宏), and then fled to the territory of the senior Wu general Zhou Ben the military governor of Desheng Circuit (德勝, headquartered in modern Hefei). Zhou initially wanted to receive Yang Meng, but Zhou Ben's son Zhou Hongzuo (周弘祚) detained Zhou Ben and arrested Yang Meng. Xu Gao, in Yang Pu's name, ordered Yang Meng demoted to commoner rank and executed.

Shortly after, Yang Pu issued an edict passing the throne to Xu Gao. In winter 937, Xu Gao accepted, establishing Southern Tang (as its Emperor Liezu).

== After yielding the throne to Southern Tang ==
Instead of the usual dynastic transitions, where the new emperor would create the old emperor a noble title, the new Southern Tang emperor submitted a petition (i.e., still acting as if he were a subject) to Yang Pu, stating:

Your old subject Xu Gao, who has received your gracious yielding of the throne [(禪讓, Shanrang)], respectfully bows to you, Emperor, and presents you with the honorable title of Emperor Gaoshang Sixuan Honggu Rang. Your palace, imperial train, and clothing will all remain the same. Your ancestral temples, insignia, and clothing colors will also remain the same as they were in the Wu days.

Yang Pu, finding it untenable for the Southern Tang emperor to still be claiming to be his subject, wrote a letter back declining this humility. The Southern Tang emperor wrote another submission (i.e., still in the form of a subject) thanking him, but continued to use the formality of a subject.

Apparently to ward off any beliefs that he would have designs on taking power back, Yang Pu often wore robes made of feathers and spent his time studying Taoist disciplines that purportedly would lead to divinity. He, however, was still fearful of the situation, and he repeatedly asked to move out of the old Wu palace. With Li Decheng also advocating the same before the Southern Tang emperor, in summer 938, Emperor Liezu converted the inner city of Run Prefecture (潤州, in modern Zhenjiang, Jiangsu) into Danyang Palace, and moved Yang Pu there. Shortly after, all members of the imperial Yang clan were also moved into the Danyang Palace, which was then put under heavy guard.

Around new year 939, Yang Pu died. Emperor Liezu declared a lengthy mourning period for him, and honored him posthumously as Emperor Rui. (Due to the quickness of his death after yielding the throne, it was commonly believed that he was killed on the new emperor's orders, although definitive proof was lacking.)

== Personal information ==
- Father
  - Yang Xingmi, posthumously honored Emperor Wu
- Mother
  - Lady Wang, Yang Xingmi's concubine
- Wife
  - Empress Wang (created 933)
- Children
  - Yang Lian (楊璉), initially the Prince of Jiangdu (created 928), later Crown Prince (created 930), later the Duke of Hongnong during Southern Tang (created 938, d. 940), posthumously honored Prince Jing of Hongnong
  - Yang Lin (楊璘), the Prince of Jiangxia (created 928), later the Duke of Jiangxia during Southern Tang
  - Yang Qiu (楊璆), the Prince of Yichun (created 928)
  - Son, died at 4, presumably killed by eunuch emissary of Southern Tang
  - Princess Shangrao, wife of Xu Jingqian, son of Xu Zhigao, posthumously honored Lady Zhenzhuang of Yan

== Notes and references ==
- Spring and Autumn Annals of the Ten Kingdoms (十國春秋), vol. 3.
- History of the Five Dynasties, vol. 134.
- New History of the Five Dynasties, vol. 61.
- Zizhi Tongjian, vols. 270, 271, 272, 273, 275, 276, 277, 278, 279, 280, 281.

Chinese nobility
Preceded by Yang Longyan (King Xuan)	King/Emperor of Wu; 920–937	Succeeded by None (dynasty destroyed)
Preceded by Yang Longyan (King Xuan)	Emperor of China (Anhui/Jiangsu/Jiangxi/Eastern Hubei); 920–937	Succeeded by Li Bian of Southern Tang
