= Zhou Ben =

Tang Dynasty general and prince

Zhou Ben (周本; 862 – February 3, 938), formally Prince Gonglie of Xiping (西平恭烈王), was a general of the Chinese Five Dynasties and Ten Kingdoms period state Wu (also known as Hongnong) and (briefly) Wu's successor state Southern Tang.

== Background ==
Zhou Ben was born in 862, during the reign of Emperor Yizong of Tang. His family was from Susong (宿松, in modern Anqing, Anhui) and claimed to be descended from the late Han dynasty general Zhou Yu—that Zhou Yu was buried in Susong and that, after the burial, the descendants stayed in the locale such that they numbered tens of households by Zhou Ben's time. Zhou Ben became an orphan in his youth and was poor, but was said to have strong arms such that he often fought and killed tigers barehanded. At one point, he became a leading officer under Zhao Huang the governor (觀察使, Guanchashi) of Xuanshe Circuit (宣歙, headquartered in modern Xuancheng, Anhui). When Yang Xingmi attacked Zhao and captured Xuanshe's capital Xuan Prefecture (宣州) in 889 and took control of Xuanshe, he captured Zhou and immediately released Zhou, making Zhou an officer in his army.

== Service under Yang Xingmi ==
It was said that in battles, Zhou Ben would fight on the front lines himself without fear, such that he was frequently wounded. After the battles were over, he would take brands and cauterize the wounds himself, while continuing to drink and converse as if nothing was happening.

By 897, Yang Xingmi had taken over Huainan Circuit (淮南, headquartered in modern Yangzhou, Jiangsu) and was serving as its military governor (Jiedushi), when Su Prefecture (蘇州, in modern Suzhou, Jiangsu), then a possession of his, came under attack by Gu Quanwu (顧全武), a key officer under Yang's rival warlord Qian Liu the military governor of Zhenhai (鎮海, headquartered in modern Hangzhou, Zhejiang) and Zhendong (鎮東, headquartered in modern Shaoxing, Zhejiang) Circuits. Yang sent Zhou to try to lift the siege on Su, but Zhou was defeated by Gu. The Yang-commissioned prefect of Su, Tai Meng (臺濛), was forced to abandon Su and flee, allowing Qian to incorporate Su into his domain.

== Service under Yang Wo ==
In 904, Qian Liu tried to have his subordinate Chen Zhang (陳璋) the prefect of Qu Prefecture (衢州, in modern Quzhou, Zhejiang) assassinated; when Chen realized this, Chen killed Qian's assassin Ye Rang (葉讓) and submitted to Huainan. Subsequently, in fall 906, Qian's forces put Qu Prefecture under siege. Yang Xingmi's son and successor Yang Wo (who had succeeded Yang Xingmi after Yang Xingmi died in 905) ordered Zhou to save Chen. Once Zhou reached Qu Prefecture, the Zhenhai/Zhendong forces lifted the siege, allowing Chen to exit the city and withdraw with Zhou. Zhou's deputy Lü Shizao (呂師造) was insulted that the Zhenhai/Zhendong forces did not attack, believing that they viewed the Huainan forces lightly, but Zhou pointed out that his own orders were to save Chen, not to engage the Zhenhai/Zhendong, and so proceeded with the withdrawal, with himself serving as rear guard. When the Zhenhai/Zhendong forces tried to trail him, he set a trap for them and defeated them.

== Service under Yang Longyan ==
The next campaign that Zhou Ben is known to have been involved in was in 908, by which time Huainan has become the state of Hongnong after the fall of Tang dynasty in 907 and Yang Wo's brother Yang Longyan was its prince (after Yang Wo was assassinated earlier in 908 and with one of the key figures in the assassination, Xu Wen, serving as Yang Longyan's regent). In fall 908, Zhou Ben was commissioned to attack Qian Liu, whose domain was known by this point as Wuyue, with Lü Shizao serving as his deputy. They put Su Prefecture under siege, but could not capture it quickly. When Wuyue relief forces commanded by Qian Liu's brother Qian Biao (錢鏢) and the general Du Jianhui (杜建徽) subsequently arrived, the Hongnong forces were caught between the Wuyue relief forces and the Su garrison, and were defeated. Zhou was forced to withdraw. After this battle, Zhou claimed to be ill and refused to accept any further commissions for some time, retiring to his house.

In 909, Wei Quanfeng the prefect of Fu Prefecture (撫州, in modern Fuzhou), a semi-independent warlord who formally submitted to both Hongnong and Hongnong's rival Later Liang, rose against Hongnong and claimed the title of military governor of Zhennan Circuit (鎮南, headquartered in modern Nanchang, Jiangxi). He quickly postured to attack Zhennan's capital Hong Prefecture (洪州), then under the control of the Hongnong-commissioned military governor Liu Wei (劉威), while Hongnong's rival Chu, a Later Liang vassal, was attacking the Hongnong city of Gao'an (高安, in modern Yichun, Jiangxi). Liu sought aid from the Hongnong central headquarters, and Xu's chief strategist Yan Keqiu recommended Zhou. However, Zhou continued to claim to be ill, so Yan went to his house and went all the way into his bedroom, to force a meeting. At the meeting, Zhou professed his opinion that the Su defeat stemmed from his not having full authority as commander, and requested that if he were to be again put in command of an army, there should not be a deputy commander. After Yan agreed, Zhou accepted the command. He was initially ordered to try to lift the siege on Gao'an, but he pointed out that Chu was merely trying to aid Wei by opening a second front and was not truly trying to capture Gao'an; he opined that if he defeated Wei, Chu forces would withdraw, so he proceeded quickly to Hong Prefecture. When Liu wanted to hold a feast for him and his soldiers, he declined – pointing out that Wei's army, some 100,000 strong, was 10 times the size of his army, and that he needed to proceed quickly before his soldiers would hear of Wei's strength and become fearful. He encountered Wei at Xiangya Lake (象牙潭, in modern Nanchang), across a river from Wei's army. He sent soldiers to make an exploratory attack across the river, and then withdrew them once Wei's army engaged, drawing Wei's army across the river. When Wei's army was crossing the river, Zhou attacked, catching it by surprise and crushing it. He captured Wei, and subsequently Hongnong forces took the rest of Wei's domain. Chu forces, hearing of Wei's defeat and also being defeated by Lü and fellow Hongnong general Mi Zhicheng (米志誠), withdrew. Yang Longyan subsequently commissioned Zhou as the prefect of Xin Prefecture (信州, in modern Shangrao, Jiangxi).

In 918, when Wu (Hongnong's been renamed Wu by that point with Yang Longyan having claimed the greater title of Prince of Wu, which Yang Xingmi had carried late in his life) attacked Tan Quanbo, who controlled the Qian Prefecture (虔州, in modern Ganzhou, Jiangxi) region but could not capture Qian Prefecture quickly, Tan sought aid from Wu's rival neighbors Wuyue, Chu, and Min. Qian Liu sent his son Qian Chuanqiu (錢傳球) with 20,000 to attack Xin Prefecture, to try to relieve the pressure on Tan. An initial engagement by the Xin garrison, which only numbered several hundred, against the Wuyue forces initially went poorly for the Xin garrison, and the Wuyue forces put Xin Prefecture under siege. Zhou Ben reacted by pitching empty tents inside the city and holding feasts with his staff members on the city walls, not moving even when Wuyue forces were launching arrows against the top of city walls. The Wuyue forces believed that there must be a hidden army inside, and withdrew in the middle of the night. (Later in the year, Wu would capture the Qian Prefecture region.)

== Service under Yang Pu ==
In 923, when Yang Longyan's brother and successor Yang Pu, who then carried the title of King of Wu, sent the official Lu Ping (盧蘋) to congratulate Wu's nominal ally Emperor Zhuangzong of Later Tang for his destruction of Later Liang earlier that year, the Later Tang emperor inquired Lu about the statuses of several famed Wu generals; Zhou was one of the generals that he asked about. Subsequently, Zhou was recalled to the Wu capital Jiangdu (江都) to serve as a general of the palace guards, and then was made the defender of Shou Prefecture (壽州, in modern Lu'an, Anhui), and then the military governor of Desheng Circuit (德勝, headquartered in modern Hefei, Anhui).

while Zhou served at Desheng, he also received the a greater general title of Anxi Dajiangjun (安西大將軍), Taiwei (太尉), Zhongshu Ling (中書令), and was created the Prince of Xiping. Even though Zhou was illiterate, he respected the scholars, dealt with staff members with respect, and cared for his people. He had no talent in financial matters, but was said to be fully understanding of military matters.

By 936, Xu Wen had also died, and his adoptive son Xu Zhigao was the regent, and was planning on taking over the Wu throne (which was then an imperial throne). His supporters Xu Jie and Zhou Zong believed that, given that Zhou Ben and Li Decheng were the most senior Wu generals, he should get them to submit petitions for the transition. Zhou Ben initially resisted the overture, stating:

I received the great grace of the late King. Ever since Xu Wen and his son became in control, I often regretted not being able to save the Yangs from danger. How can you get me to do this?

However, Zhou Ben's son Zhou Hongzuo (周弘祚) pressured him, and eventually Zhou Ben and Li both went to Jiangdu to pay homage to Yang Pu, but at the same time praise Xu Zhigao and petition for a transition. Both of them went to Xu's base at Jinling to do so as well.

In 937, Yang Pu's older brother Yang Meng the Duke of Liyang, whom Xu had put under house arrest at He Prefecture (和州, in modern Chaohu City, Anhui), believing that Xu was about to take over the throne, decided to make one final uprising. He assassinated Wang Hong (王宏), whom Xu had put in charge of guarding him, and then took two guards loyal to him and fled to Desheng's capital Lu Prefecture (廬州), hoping to meet with Zhou and persuade him to rise against Xu. When Zhou received this news, he was prepared to meet Yang Meng, but Zhou Hongzuo refused to let him see Yang Meng, despite Zhou Ben's protestation, "My young master is coming. Why will you not let me see him?" Zhou Hongzuo closed the mansion doors and refused to let Zhou Ben out, while sending soldiers to seize Yang Meng and deliver him to Jiangdu. Xu had Yang Meng killed on the way, at Caishi (采石, in modern Ma'anshan, Anhui). Later in the year, Xu had Yang Pu pass the throne to him, ending Wu and establishing a new Southern Tang state as its Emperor Liezu.

== Death ==
Zhou Ben kept all of his titles after the Wu to Southern Tang transition, but in spring 938, he died, and according to traditional accounts died with regret and anger that he was unable to preserve Wu. He was buried with ceremonies with grandeur matching those used for Guo Ziyi during Tang, and given the posthumous name Gonglie ("respectful and responsible").

== Notes and references ==
- Spring and Autumn Annals of the Ten Kingdoms (十國春秋), vol. 7.
- Zizhi Tongjian, vols. 258, 261, 265, 267, 270, 280, 281.
