= Xu Jie (Southern Tang) =

Xu Jie (徐玠) (868-943), courtesy name Yungui (蘊圭), formally the Prince of Gaoping (高平王), was a Chinese military general and politician. He was an officer of the Chinese Five Dynasties and Ten Kingdoms Period states Wu and Southern Tang, serving as a chancellor during the reign of Southern Tang's first emperor Li Bian (Xu Zhigao).

== Background ==
Xu Jie was born in 868, during the reign of Emperor Xizong of Tang. He was from Pengcheng (彭城, in modern Xuzhou, Jiangsu). He was said to be dextrous, capable, and a good speaker. At some point, he became an officer under the general Cui Hong (崔洪), who was, as of 899, serving as the military governor (Jiedushi) of Fengguo Circuit (奉國, headquartered in modern Zhumadian, Henan). In 899, a number of Fengguo officers, led by Cui Jingsi (崔景思), were fearful of the major warlord Zhu Quanzhong the military governor of Xuanwu Circuit (宣武, headquartered in modern Kaifeng, Henan), who was forcing Cui Hong into submitting to him. They coerced Cui Hong into abandoning Fengguo's capital Cai Prefecture (蔡州) and fleeing to the domain of another major warlord, Yang Xingmi the military governor of Huainan Circuit (淮南, headquartered in modern Yangzhou, Jiangsu). As they approached Yang's domain, Cui Hong sent Xu in advance to meet Yang to submit. Yang subsequently retained Xu to serve as an officer under him.

By 906, Huainan was under the rule of Yang Xingmi's son and successor Yang Wo. That year, Yang Wo, taking advantage of a succession struggle at Zhennan Circuit (鎮南, headquartered in modern Nanchang, Jiangxi) after the death of its military governor Zhong Chuan between Zhong Chuan's son Zhong Kuangshi and adoptive son Zhong Yangui (鍾延規), launched a major attack on Zhennan and captured it. During the campaign, Xu served as the food supply officer, and after the successful campaign was made the prefect of Ji Prefecture (吉州, in modern Ji'an, Jiangxi).

== During Hongnong/Wu ==
By 912, Tang had fallen, and Yang Wo's domain was now ruled by his brother and successor Yang Longyan, who carried the title of Prince of Hongnong, as an independent state. However, the governance of the Hongnong state was actually in the hands of Xu Wen, who had along with Zhang Hao, assassinated Yang Wo and become regent. Several of Yang Xingmi's old generals — Liu Wei (劉威) the military governor of Zhennan, Tao Ya (陶雅) the governor of She Prefecture (歙州, in modern Huangshan, Anhui), Li Yu (李遇) the governor of Xuan Prefecture (宣州, in modern Xuancheng, Anhui), and Li Jian (李簡) the prefect of Chang Prefecture (常州, in modern Changzhou, Jiangsu) — were dissatisfied with the situation and were particularly not respectful of Xu Wen. Li Yu was particularly upset with Xu Wen's governance, often stating, "Who is this Xu Wen? I have not even met him, and now he is in control of the state!" In 912, when Xu Jie, then serving as the director of travel pavilions (館驛使, Guanyishi), was on a diplomatic mission to Hongnong's southeastern neighbor Wuyue, Xu Wen had him visit Li Yu at Xuan to try to persuade Li Yu to go to the capital Guangling (廣陵) to pay homage to Yang Longyan. Li Yu initially agreed. However, Xu Jie, during the conversation, stated, "If you do not do so, Lord, people will believe that you are rebelling." Li Yu angrily responded, "You, sir, said that I, Li Yu, would be rebelling. Is it not the case that one who killed the Shizhong [(i.e., Yang Wo, who carried that title)] would be rebelling?" Xu Wen, subsequently, had the general Chai Zaiyong (柴再用) attack Xuan. When Li Yu subsequently surrendered, Xu Wen had Li Yu's family slaughtered. Li Yu's son had married one of Yang Xingmi's daughters, who was spared from execution because she was the prince's sister. She subsequently married Xu Jie as his wife.

In 918, Xu Wen's oldest biological son Xu Zhixùn, whom Xu Wen had made junior regent and in day-to-day control of the state (which by that point was known as Wu), was assassinated by the general Zhu Jin, who subsequently committed suicide. As Xu Wen's other biological sons were all young, Xu Wen's adoptive son Xu Zhigao was made the junior regent. Xu Zhigao considered Xu Jie's governance of Ji Prefecture to be poor, and found him to be corrupt and obscene, and therefore removed him from the post. However, Xu Wen himself considered Xu Jie to be a good assistant, and therefore invited Xu Jie to serve on staff, as the deputy commander of Xu Wen's army; and Xu Jie became a close associate to him. As Xu Jie resented Xu Zhigao, he often told Xu Wen, "The regency of the government is so important that you cannot trust it to someone of a different surname. You should let your proper son Xu Zhixún [(Xu Wen's second biological son)] replace him." But as Xu Wen was considering the matter and resolving to replace Xu Zhigao with Xu Zhixún, he fell ill and died in 927.

Shortly after Xu Wen's death, then-Wu emperor Yang Pu (Yang Longyan's younger brother and successor) split Xu Wen's titles between Xu Zhigao and Xu Zhixún, with Xu Zhigao assuming Xu Wen's title as overseer of all military matters (都督中外總軍事, Dudu Zhongwai Zongjunshi), while Xu Zhixún took on the title of deputy supreme commander of all circuits (諸道副都統, Zhudao Fu Dutong, with Xu Wen having been supreme commander before, and that post now left open) and military governor of Ningguo (寧國, headquartered in modern Xuancheng, Anhui) and Zhenhai (鎮海, headquartered in modern Zhenjiang, Jiangsu) Circuits, which Xu Wen had been; he also took the greater honorary chancellor title of Shizhong (侍中). Even though Xu Zhigao remained in control of Wu's imperial government, Xu Zhixún, at Jinling (金陵, in modern Nanjing, Jiangsu), controlled the largest army of the state, and he, wielding that authority, contended for decision-making with Xu Zhigao, who tried to curb Xu Zhixun's military power.

Given Xu Zhixún's military strength, Xu Zhigao feared him, but Xu Zhixún's arrogance alienated his younger biological brothers. Xu Jie, who had previously supported Xu Zhixún, also realized that Xu Zhixun lacked the proper abilities to lead, and instead turned his allegiance to Xu Zhigao, informing Xu Zhigao of Xu Zhixún's shortcomings. Later in 929, Xu Zhixún tried to summon Xu Zhigao to Jinling to attend a ceremony where they would remove mourning clothes that they had put on for Xu Wen's death; Xu Zhigao refused, claiming that Yang Pu would not let him leave the capital. Xu Zhixún, meanwhile, was tricked by Xu Zhigao to go to Guangling. Once he arrived there, Xu Zhigao detained him and did not allow him to return to Jinling, sending the officer Ke Hou (柯厚) to lead the Jinling forces back to Guangling, thus consolidating the command under Xu Zhigao himself.

Given Xu Jie's allegiance to Xu Zhigao at this point, Xu Zhigao became closely associated with him, with the resentment between them gone. When Xu Zhigao himself later took up his headquarters in Jinling, Xu Jie was made the commander of his army. As of 934, he, along with Li Jianxun, was beginning to encourage Xu Zhigao to take over the throne from Yang Pu. When, as part of that transition process, Xu Zhigao received the title of Generalissimo and established a headquarters in 936, Xu Zhigao made Xu Jie and a long-time advisor, Song Qiqiu, the military advisors at the Generalissimo headquarters. In 937, with Xu Zhigao's having received the title of Prince of Qi, Xu Jie and Song were made the principality's chancellors.

== During Southern Tang ==
In fall 937, Yang Pu yielded the throne to Xu Zhigao, ending Wu, with Xu Zhigao starting a new state later known as Southern Tang. When Xu Zhigao, after taking the throne, submitted a petition to Yang accepting the throne and still treating Yang Pu like an emperor and his lord, it was Xu Jie who delivered Xu Zhigao's petition to Yang. When, subsequently, many officials were submitting petitions to Xu Zhigao asking to change place names containing "Yang" or "Wu" as part of the name, it was Xu Jie who spoke against such petitions, stating, "Your Imperial Majesty accepted the throne in accordance with the will of heaven and man, without seizing it by improper means. The flattering and evil people are concentrating on changing minute matters. This is not a priority, and you should not follow them." Xu Zhigao agreed with his assessment.

Xu Jie was subsequently made the military governor of Ningguo Circuit (寧國, headquartered at Xuan Prefecture). It was said that when this was announced, his wife Lady Yang, remembering what had happened with her first husband and his family, died due to her distress and anger. He was later moved to Zhennan Circuit and given the honorary chancellor title of Zhongshu Ling (中書令). He was later recalled to the Southern Tang imperial government to serve as chancellor with the titles of Situ (司徒) and You Chengxiang (右丞相), but was not given real responsibility. It was said that he was particularly more greedy in his old age, such that his subordinates were distressed. He was also involved in alchemy, but often bought discount cinnabar of lower grades in his alchemist exercises, leading to derision. He died in 943, during the reign of Li Jing, Xu Zhigao's son and successor (as Xu Zhigao later changed his name to Li Bian, reflecting his birth surname).

== Notes and references ==
- Spring and Autumn Annals of the Ten Kingdoms, vol. 21.
- Zizhi Tongjian, vols. 268, 276, 279, 280, 281.
