= Yan Keqiu =

Yan Keqiu (嚴可求) (died November 19, 930) was a key official of the Chinese Five Dynasties and Ten Kingdoms period state Wu, as the chief strategist for the Wu regent Xu Wen and each of Wu's three rulers, Yang Wo, Yang Longyan, and Yang Pu.

== Background ==
It is not known when Yan Keqiu was born. His family was from Tong Prefecture (同州, in modern Weinan, Shaanxi), but his father Yan Shi (嚴實) had served as an assistant to a Tang dynasty director for Yangtze River-Huai River shipping, and therefore settled at the future Wu capital Guangling (廣陵, in modern Yangzhou, Jiangsu), which was then the capital of Tang's Huainan Circuit (淮南). It was said that Yan Keqiu was intelligent and capable of strategies in his youth, and became a guest of the Huainan officer Xu Wen, then serving under Huinan's military governor (Jiedushi) Yang Xingmi. Through Xu's relationship with Yang, Yan became a member of Yang's staff and often offered advice to Yang.

== Service under Yang Xingmi ==
Even though Yan Keqiu was directly serving under Yang Xingmi, he remained closely allied with Xu Wen. In 903, when Yang's brother-in-law and subordinate Zhu Yanshou the military governor of Fengguo Circuit (奉國, headquartered in modern Lu'an, Anhui) was planning to join the rebellion started by two other Yang subordinates, Tian Jun the military governor of Ningguo Circuit (寧國, headquartered in modern Xuancheng, Anhui) and An Renyi (安仁義) the military prefect (團練使, Tuanlianshi) of Run Prefecture (潤州, in modern Zhenjiang, Jiangsu), it was Yan who suggested to Xu a plan to trick Zhu into a trap, which Xu then suggested to Yang and which Yang then accepted — that Yang would pretend to be blind to his wife (Zhu's sister) Lady Zhu and be preparing to offer the command of Huainan to Zhu. When Zhu believed so and went to Guangling to accept Yang's offer, Yang had Xu seize and execute him. After Zhu's death, Yang promoted both Xu and Yan.

When Yang became gravely ill late in 905, he directed Yan to meet with him privately on one occasion. At the meeting, he stated to Yan that he was waiting for the arrival of his oldest son Yang Wo, who was then serving as the governor (觀察使, Guanchashi) of Xuan Prefecture (宣州, i.e., the capital of Ningguo Circuit) and that he had directed his key advisor Zhou Yin (周隱) to issue an order summoning Yang Wo. Subsequently, Yan and Xu went to see Zhou, and they realized that Zhou, who opposed Yang Wo's succession, had drafted the order but had left the order on his desk. They took the order from Zhou's desk and had it delivered to Yang Wo, who then returned to Guangling. When Yang Xingmi subsequently died, Yang Wo succeeded him as the military governor of Huainan Circuit.

== Service under Yang Wo and in the aftermaths of Yang Wo's assassination ==
In 907, the powerful warlord Zhu Quanzhong the military governor of Xuanwu Circuit (宣武, headquartered in modern Kaifeng, Henan) forced Tang's final emperor Emperor Ai to yield the throne to him, ending Tang and starting a new Later Liang as its Emperor Taizu. Yang Wo, along with several other regional warlords, refused to recognize the Later Liang emperor and continued to use the Tang era name of Tianyou, but by this point was effectively the ruler of his own domain, then known as Hongnong (as he carried the title of Prince of Hongnong) and later known as Wu (as Yang Xingmi carried the title of Prince of Wu). Nevertheless, by this point, his own powers were limited, as Xu Wen, who was then one of the headquarters guard commanders, as well as fellow guard commander Zhang Hao, had effectively taken over most of Hongnong's governance after killing a number of Yang Wo's associates in a coup earlier in 907. Yan Keqiu's role in the early parts of Yang Wo's administration, if any, is not clear.

In 908, fearing that Yang Wo would seize power back and act against them, Zhang and Xu assassinated Yang Wo, while claiming that Yang Wo had died of an illness. Their original plan was to divide Hongnong between themselves and then submit to Later Liang, but once the assassination occurred, Zhang postured at taking over the rule over Hongnong himself. Yan pointed out to him, however, that several senior generals posted away from Guangling, including Liu Wei (劉威), Tao Ya (陶雅), Li Yu (李遇), and Li Jian (李簡), could hardly be expected to support his takeover, and therefore advocated having Yang Wo's younger brother Yang Longyan take over the Hongnong throne — and he subsequently made a public declaration, which he wrote in the name of Yang Wo's and Yang Longyan's mother Lady Dowager Shi, asking the generals and officials to support Yang Longyan. Zhang was depressed at this public display and acquiesced to Yang Longyan's taking the throne. It was said that the senior general Zhu Jin was so impressed by Yan's public display of bravery in standing up against Zhang that he honored Yan like an older brother. (This might imply that Yan was older than Zhu; if so, Yan would have been born before 867, when Zhu was born.)

Zhang, however, maintained control over the Hongnong governance, and soon made Xu the governor of Zhexi Circuit (浙西, headquartered at Run Prefecture). Yan pointed out to Xu, however, that once Xu left Guangling, Zhang would blame Yang Wo's death on him. Xu agreed with Yan's analysis and asked for Yan's help. Yan persuaded another senior general, Li Chengsi (李承嗣) the deputy military governor of Huainan to meet with Zhang and Xu (persuading Li that once Xu left Guangling, Li himself would be isolated); at that meeting, Yan openly cursed at Xu for wanting to leave Guangling and not supporting Yang Longyan's new reign; Xu "apologized" and offered to stay at Guangling, and Zhang acquiesced. Zhang soon thereafter realized that Yan was working in league with Xu, and so sent an assassin to kill Yan. When the assassin arrived, Yan did not beg for his life, but instead begged to write a letter to Yang Longyan to bid farewell. After he did so, the assassin read the letter and was touched by it, and therefore spared him, taking only his treasure.

Meanwhile, Xu and Yan were planning on eliminating Zhang. They persuaded the officer Zhong Taizhang (鍾泰章) to join the plan, and Zhong gathered 30 soldiers and assassinated Zhang. Shortly after, Xu publicly stated that Zhang was the one behind the plot to assassinate Yang Wo, and pledged loyalty to Yang Longyan. Effectively, he became Hongnong's regent. He divided up the administrative responsibilities between Yan (who became in charge of military matters) and Luo Zhixiang (駱知祥) (who became in charge of fiscal matters). Both were capable in what they did, and their abilities were appreciated by the people.

== Service under Yang Longyan ==
In 909, when Wei Quanfeng, a semi-independent warlord who was nominally submitting to both Hongnong and Later Liang and who controlled the region around Fu Prefecture (撫州, in modern Fuzhou, Jiangxi), rose against Hongnong and claimed to be the military governor of Zhennan Circuit (鎮南, headquartered in modern Nanchang, Jiangxi), Hongnong's rival state Chu (a vassal to Later Liang) sent an army to aid Wei by attacking Hongnong's city of Gao'an (高安, in modern Yichun, Jiangxi). As Wei put Zhennan's capital Hong Prefecture (洪州) under siege, Zhennan's military governor Liu Wei sought aid from the Hongnong headquarters. Xu Wen sought Yan Keqiu's advice on whom to send, and Yan recommended Zhou Ben — who, however, had refused to accept any military commands and claimed to be ill since he was defeated by Wuyue forces at Su Prefecture (蘇州, in modern Suzhou, Jiangsu) in 908. Yan went to visit Zhou and went directly into his bedroom, forcing a meeting. Zhou confessed his opinion that the defeat at Su Prefecture occurred because he was not given full command powers. Yan promised to get him full authority, and Zhou accepted the command. Zhou subsequently defeated and captured Wei, and Chu forces withdrew, allowing Hongnong to take full control of Wei's territory.

Wei's defeat left one semi-independent warlord in the Zhennan region — Lu Guangchou, who controlled the region around Qian Prefecture (虔州, in modern Ganzhou, Jiangxi), who, like Wei previously, was nominally submitting to both Hongnong (which became named Wu in 910 when Yang Longyan claimed the title of Prince of Wu that his father carried) and Later Liang. In 911, Lu died, and his son Lu Yanchang inherited his domain, still nominally submitting to both Wu and Later Liang. Yan proposed posting an army to Xingan (新淦, in modern Ji'an, Jiangxi) to plot an eventual campaign against Qian Prefecture, and that each time a new corps is rotated to the Xingan post, that a small increase be made in the number of soldiers. Yan's plan was carried out, and as the Wu army at Xingan gradually increased, the Qian Prefecture army did not realize Wu's intent.

By 916, Xu was remotely controlling the Wu command decisions from Sheng Prefecture (昇州, in modern Nanjing, Jiangsu), leaving his son Xu Zhixun in command at Guangling as the junior regent. Early that year, the officers Ma Qian (馬謙) and Li Qiu (李球) seized Yang Longyan one night and intended to attack Xu Zhixun. Xu Zhixun wanted to flee Guangling that night, but Yan pointed out that if he did, the situation would become uncontrollable, so Xu Zhixun did not. The headquarters officials were still panicking, but Yan comforted them and then went to sleep himself in the open, showing that he was not fearful, and this calmed the other officials. The next morning, Zhu Jin arrived with an army from Run Prefecture, and the mutineers under Ma and Li collapsed in fear, and Ma and Li were captured and killed.

In 918, Wu finally launched an operation to capture Qian Prefecture and the surrounding region, which by that point was controlled by Lu Guangchou's old associate Tan Quanbo, with the general Wang Qi (王祺) in command. Prior to the attack's being launched, Yan hired engineers to open up the Gan River rapids at Ganshi (贛石, in modern Ji'an), allowing the Ganshi rapids to be navigated by the Wu fleet and allowing the Wu attack to quickly reach Qian Prefecture. (Wang Qi would subsequently be stymied by Tan's defense and would eventually die in illness while still sieging Qian, but the succeeding commander Liu Xin (劉信) was able to defeat Tan and capture Qian Prefecture, allowing Wu to take over the region.)

While the Qian campaign was going on, though, another plot against Xu Zhixun was occurring at Guangling. Zhu, who had previously had a good relationship with Xu Zhixun, had drawn Xu Zhixun's jealousy for carrying a greater title than Xu Zhixun himself, as the deputy generalissimo of all circuits (with Yang Longyan himself as generalissimo). Xu Zhixun therefore wanted to eject Zhu from Guangling by making him the military governor of a new Jinghuai Circuit (靜淮, headquartered in modern Huai'an, Jiangsu). This drew Zhu's anger, but Zhu outwardly appeared to be still respectful to Xu Zhixun (who was also alienating the other generals and officials as he was arrogant and promiscuous). Zhu invited Xu Zhixun to his home for a farewell feast; at the feast, he assassinated Xu Zhixun, and then tried to ask Yang Longyan to cooperate with him; Yang Longyan, however, did not dare to be involved, and Zhu, who then came under attack by Xu Wen's associate Zhai Qian (翟虔), committed suicide. Both Xu Zhixun's adoptive brother Xu Zhigao, who was then the military prefect of Run Prefecture, and Xu Wen himself subsequently arrived to control the situation at Guangling,. Xu Wen immediately suspected the general Mi Zhicheng (米志誠) of acting in league with Zhu and wanted to kill Mi, but Yan was concerned that Mi might resist. He therefore falsely claimed that the Wu army at Yuan Prefecture (袁州, in modern Yichun) had just defeated a Chu army and summoned the generals and officials all to the headquarters to congratulate Yang Longyan on the victory. As the generals were arriving, Yan had soldiers that he posted at the headquarters gates seize Mi and then killed Mi and his sons. Xu Wen subsequently wanted to expand the reprisals, as he believed that many other generals were acting in concert with Zhu. Both Yan and Xu Zhigao pointed out to him that Xu Zhixun had brought disaster on himself through his unreasonable actions. Xu Wen's anger subsided gradually, and he did not carry out the large-scale reprisals that he initially was inclined to carry out.

In the aftermaths of Xu Zhixun's death, Xu Wen, seeing no other options (as his other sons were young), made Xu Zhigao junior regent at Guangling, and Xu Zhigao, by behaving humbly and reasonably, gradually won the hearts of the people. Yan, seeing this and believing that Xu Wen should eventually pass his powers to a biological son, repeatedly suggested to Xu Wen that he had another biological son, Xu Zhixun (younger), take over as junior regent. Knowing that Yan was against him, Xu Zhigao, in cooperation with Luo Zhixiang, tried to have Yan ejected from Guangling to serve as the prefect of Chu Prefecture (楚州, in modern Huai'an). When Yan received the order, however, he went to see Xu Wen. At the meeting, he pointed out that at that time, Wu's nominal ally and fellow rival to Later Liang, Jin, was winning victory after victory over Later Liang, and that Jin's prince Li Cunxu appeared to be posturing to claim the imperial title himself and claim lawful succession from the Tang emperors. Yan argued that, with that being the case, Wu's political structure was untenable since it, like Jin, had been claiming its desire to reestablish Tang. Yan instead suggested that Xu Wen advise Yang Longyan to claim imperial title as well and restructure the Wu political structure to cut off connections to Tang. Xu Wen agreed, and he kept Yan at Guangling to prepare for ceremonies for such a break with Tang. Xu Zhigao, seeing that he could not eliminate Yan, instead decided to make peace with Yan by giving a daughter in marriage to Yan's son Yan Xu.

In 919, under Xu Wen's advice, Yang Longyan, while not claiming imperial title, claimed the greater title of King of Wu and formally broke from Tang-bestowed titles. In the new Wu government, modeled after the Tang imperial government and no longer structured like a circuit headquarters, Yan received the title of Menxia Shilang (門下侍郎) — the deputy head of the examination bureau of government (門下省, Menxia Sheng) (although in effect in command of examination bureau, as since middle Tang times, the position of head of examination bureau, Shizhong (侍中), was usually an honorary title that was rarely actually filled, and in the edicts that Yang Longyan issued after becoming king, no one was made Shizhong). After Yang Longyan died in 920 and was succeeded by his brother Yang Pu, Yan continued to serve in the Wu government.

== Service under Yang Pu ==
In 923, Li Cunxu claimed imperial title as the emperor of a new Later Tang (as Emperor Zhuangzong), and was soon set to make a final confrontation with Later Liang after gaining a foothold south of the Yellow River (which had generally defined the boundary between his former Jin state and Later Liang) at Yun Prefecture (鄆州, in modern Tai'an, Shandong). He sent emissaries to Wu, requesting that Wu jointly attack Later Liang with him. Xu Wen considered launching a fleet north but not actually commit to attacking Later Liang — instead, having the fleet observe the campaign and aid the winning side. Yan Keqiu opposed, pointing out that the Wu fleet could be caught in the middle if Later Liang requested aid, so Xu did not do so.

After Later Tang forces captured the Later Liang capital Daliang later in the year, destroying Later Liang (as Later Liang's final emperor, Zhu Zhen, committed suicide before Daliang's fall), Later Tang emissaries delivered the news to Wu and Former Shu, drawing apprehension from both states that they would be the Later Tang emperor's next target. Xu blamed Yan for not launching the fleet north, but Yan believed that the Later Tang emperor's victories were unsustainable given his own personal behavior, stating while smiling:

I heard that after the Lord of Tang gained the Central Plains, he became full of arrogance, and was not governing his subordinates appropriately. Within several years, there will be internal disturbances. We should simply be humble in our words and provide him with good gifts, while protecting our boundaries and our people, to wait for this to happen.

Possibly under Yan's advice, Yang Pu subsequently refused to receive edicts (i.e., communiques that would imply that he was a subject of Later Tang's) from Emperor Zhuangzong. Emperor Zhuangzong, not yet wanting to break with Wu, instead resent his communique as a letter (i.e., treating Wu as an equal state) that started with the greeting of, "The letter of the emperor of the great Tang to the lord of Wu." Wu's return communique started with the greeting of, "The respectful letter of the lord of the great Wu to the emperor of the great Tang," to show respect and yet equality.

Late in the year, Wu sent the official Lu Ping (盧蘋) as an emissary to Later Tang. Before Lu went to the Later Tang court, Yan anticipated what kind of questions Emperor Zhuangzong might ask him, and had Lu prepare answers; as it turned out, the questions Lu was asked matched what Yan anticipated. After Lu returned, Lu reported that Emperor Zhuangzong had become occupied with hunting and tours, was obsessed with treasure, and was refusing good advice, such that he was beginning to draw resentment from the people.

In 926, by which time Yan was carrying the title of You Pushe (右僕射), one of the heads of the executive bureau of government (尚書省, Shangshu Sheng), he was again made Menxia Shilang, but this time given the additional designation of Tong Zhongshu Menxia Pingzhangshi (同中書門下平章事), making him a chancellor.

Later in the year, Emperor Zhuangzong was killed in a mutiny and succeeded by adoptive brother Li Siyuan (as Emperor Mingzong). When the news arrived at Wu, Xu became even more respectful of Yan for his correct predictions.

Despite Xu Zhigao's previous attempts to make peace with Yan, Yan, along with Xu Jie, continued to make suggestions to Xu Wen over the years to replace Xu Zhigao with the younger Xu Zhixun. Xu Wen continually refused because Xu Zhigao was filially pious and careful, but by 927 became resolved to do so. He was ready to head to Guangling himself to advise Yang Pu to take imperial title, and then reassign Xu Zhigao and the younger Xu Zhixun. However, as he was getting ready to depart Sheng Prefecture, he became ill, so he instead sent the younger Xu Zhixun to submit his petition to Yang Pu, with directions to stay at Guangling after submitting the petition. Xu Zhigao, hearing the news, was prepared to resign his post as junior regent and request a post as the military governor of Zhennan Circuit, but while the younger Xu Zhixun was still on the way, Xu Wen died, causing the younger Xu Zhixun to immediately return to Sheng Prefecture, so Xu Zhigao never actually submitted his resignation. Shortly after Xu Wen's death, Yang Pu, in accordance with his petition, claimed imperial title. Yan himself died in 930, while serving as Zuo Pushe and chancellor.

== Notes and references ==
- Spring and Autumn Annals of the Ten Kingdoms (十國春秋), vol. 10.
- Zizhi Tongjian, vols. 265, 266, 267, 269, 270, 272, 274, 275, 276, 277.
