= Xu Zhixun =

Xu Zhixun may refer to one of the two oldest biological sons of Xu Wen, regent of Wu:

- Xu Zhixun (elder) (徐知訓; pinyin: Xú Zhīxùn) (died 918), Xu Wen's oldest son, served as Wu's junior regent when Xu Wen was away from the capital
- Xu Zhixun (younger) (徐知詢; pinyin: Xú Zhīxún) (died 934), Xu Wen's second son, who tried to become Wu's regent after Xu Wen's death but lost out against his adoptive brother Xu Zhigao
