= Xu Jie (disambiguation) =

Xu Jie (Chinese: 徐階; pinyin: Xú Jiē, 1503–1583), was a Ming dynasty politician.

Xu Jie may also refer to:

- Xu Jie (Southern Tang) (Chinese: 徐玠; pinyin: Xú Jiè, 868–943), Southern Tang politician
- Xu Jie (politician, born 1955) (Chinese: 许杰; pinyin: Xǔ Jié), PRC politician
- Xu Jie (politician, born 1963) (Chinese: 徐劼), a Chinese politician currently serving as Executive Vice Chairman of the Standing Committee of the Wuxi Municipal People's Congress.
- Xu Jie (geologist) (Chinese: 许杰), a Chinese geologist, paleontologist, and stratigrapher, and an academician of the Chinese Academy of Sciences.

== Sportspeople ==
- Xu Jie (basketball), member of the China men's national basketball team
- Xu Jie (table tennis) (Chinese: 徐洁; pinyin: Xú Jié, born 1982), Chinese-Polish table tennis player
- Xu Jie (sitting volleyball) (Chinese: 许捷; pinyin: Xǔ Jié, born 1983), Chinese sitting volleyball player
