= Zhu Jin =

Chinese warlord during the Tang dynasty

Zhu Jin (朱瑾) (867–918) was a warlord late in the Chinese Tang dynasty who would later be a major general of the Wu (also known as Hongnong) state during the subsequent Five Dynasties and Ten Kingdoms period. In the late Tang years, Zhu Jin, as the military governor (jiedushi) of Taining Circuit (泰寧, headquartered in modern Jining, Shandong) would form a power bloc with his cousin Zhu Xuan the military governor of Tianping Circuit (天平, headquartered in modern Tai'an, Shandong), but they were both eventually defeated by Zhu Quanzhong the military governor of Xuanwu Circuit (宣武, headquartered in modern Kaifeng, Henan). Zhu Xuan was killed, and Zhu Jin fled to the domain of Yang Xingmi the military governor of Huainan Circuit (淮南, headquartered in modern Yangzhou, Jiangsu); he would thereafter serve under Yang and Yang's successors, whose domain formed the Wu state eventually. In 918, angry at the arrogance of the Wu junior regent Xu Zhixun (the son of the regent Xu Wen), he assassinated Xu Zhixun, but Xu Wen's troops attacked him; he committed suicide when he saw that there was no escape.

== Background ==
Zhu Jin was born in 867, during the reign of Emperor Yizong. He was from Xiayi (下邑, in modern Suzhou, Anhui). His older cousin (or, according to some sources, brother) Zhu Xuan was an officer at Tianping Circuit (and would later be military governor), and so he went to serve under Zhu Xuan. He was said to have great ambitions and to be talented in his youth and was the most ferocious warrior in Zhu Xuan's army, but was also said to be violent and cruel.

In 884, when Zhu Xuan's neighbor Zhu Quanzhong the military governor of Xuanwu Circuit came under attack by Qin Zongquan, a former Tang military governor of Fengguo Circuit (奉國, headquartered in modern Zhumadian, Henan), who had turned against Tang and was pillaging the nearby circuits, Zhu Quanzhong sought aid from Zhu Xuan, and Zhu Xuan sent Zhu Jin to aid him. After Zhu Jin repelled Qin's attack, Zhu Quanzhong, in appreciation, honored Zhu Xuan as an older brother.

In 886, Zhu Jin wanted to capture nearby Taining Circuit, so he sought to marry a daughter of Taining's military governor Qi Kerang. Qi agreed. On the set wedding date, Zhu Jin personally went to Taining's capital Yan Prefecture (兗州), ostensibly to carry out the marriage, but he hid armors and weapons in his train. When he got to Yan, he launched a surprise attack and expelled Qi. He then took over the circuit. Then-reigning Emperor Xizong (Emperor Yizong's son and successor) thereafter confirmed Zhu Jin as the military governor of Taining, allowing him and Zhu Xuan to each govern a circuit as close allies.

== As military governor of Taining Circuit ==
Initially, Zhu Xuan and Zhu Jin continued to be allies with Zhu Quanzhong as well, and in fall 887, when Qin Zongquan launched a major attack on Zhu Quanzhong and Zhu Quanzhong sought aid from them, both Zhu Xuan and Zhu Jin personally led troops to aid him. Together with the troops of Zhu's own Xuanwu Circuit and Yicheng Circuit (義成, headquartered in modern Anyang, Henan), which Zhu Quanzhong had recently taken over, they defeated Qin; from this point, Qin's strength began to wane. In gratitude, Zhu Quanzhong honored both Zhu Xuan and Zhu Jin as older brothers.

However, later that year, this relationship would be broken. The ambitious Zhu Quanzhong had designs on Tianping and Taining, and therefore falsely accused Zhu Xuan of inducing Xuanwu soldiers to desert. Zhu Xuan thereafter made counteraccusations. In response, Zhu Quanzhong had his officers Zhu Zhen (朱珍) and Ge Congzhou launch a surprise attack on Tianping's Cao (曹州) and Pu (濮州, both in modern Heze, Shandong) Prefectures. When Zhu Xuan and Zhu Jin engaged the Xuanwu forces, they were defeated and barely escaped with their lives. From this point, they became enemies to Zhu Quanzhong.

In winter 891, Zhu Jin attacked Xuanwu's Shan Prefecture (單州, in modern Heze), but the Xuanwu officers Ding Hui and Zhang Guiba (張歸霸) engaged and defeated him.

In 893, with Zhu Quanzhong's son Zhu Youyu (朱友裕) sieging Zhu Jin's ally Shi Pu the military governor of Ganhua Circuit (感化, headquartered in modern Xuzhou, Jiangsu) at Ganhua's capital Xu Prefecture (徐州), Zhu Jin tried to go to his aid, but he was defeated by Zhu Youyu and Huo Cun (霍存) and forced to withdraw.

Soon thereafter, Xu Prefecture fell under the attack of the Xuanwu officer Pang Shigu (龐師古), and Shi committed suicide, allowing Zhu Quanzhong to take over Ganhua. With Ganhua conquered, Zhu Quanzhong sent Pang north to attack Taining. Pang had initial successes against Zhu Jin. Late in the year, Ge attacked Zhu Wei (朱威) the prefect of Tianping's Qi Prefecture (齊州, in modern Jinan, Shandong). Both Zhu Xuan and Zhu Jin personally tried to aid Qi Prefecture, but Zhu Quanzhong then arrived himself and defeated them.

After this series of defeats, both Zhu Xuan and Zhu Jin sought aid from Zhu Quanzhong's archrival Li Keyong the military governor of Hedong Circuit (河東, headquartered in modern Taiyuan, Shanxi). Li Keyong repeatedly sent officers to reinforce Tianping and Taining, but even with Hedong's aid the losses mounted.

In winter 895, Zhu Quanzhong and Ge attacked Yan Prefecture and put it under siege. Further, Zhu Jin's older cousin Zhu Qiong (朱瓊) the prefect of Qi surrendered the prefecture to Zhu Quanzhong. When Zhu Xuan sent his officers He Gui, Liu Cun (柳存), and the Hedong officer He Huaibao (何懷寶) to try to lift the siege on Yan, Zhu Quanzhong defeated and captured them. He showed them to Zhu Jin to try to urge him to surrender. Zhu Jin pretended to agree and offered to surrender the seals (the symbols of his control of Taining), but requested that Zhu Qiong be the one sent into the city to retrieve them. When Zhu Qiong entered the city, Zhu Jin had him seized and beheaded, which caused Zhu Quanzhong's army to lose morale, so Zhu Quanzhong, after killing Liu and He Huaibao, withdrew. However, he left Ge to continue to watch Yan, but Zhu Jin defended the city and refused to engage Ge. Later in the year, when Ge was set to withdraw, he tricked Zhu Jin into believing that Hedong and Tianping aid forces were arriving; Zhu Jin thus came out of the city to attack, and Ge defeated him before withdrawing.

It was said that, by this point, with Tianping and Taining repeatedly under Xuanwu attack, both circuits had been laid waste. They again sought aid from Li Keyong, and Li Keyong sent the officers Li Chengsi (李承嗣) and Shi Yan (史儼) to aid them, going through Weibo Circuit (魏博, headquartered in modern Handan, Hebei) with the permission of Weibo's military governor Luo Hongxin. However, a subsequently Hedong relief force commanded by Li Keyong's adoptive son Li Cunxin angered Luo by pillaging the Weibo countryside; Luo fought back and defeated Li Cunxin, and further entered into an alliance with Zhu Quanzhong. When Li Keyong himself then attacked Weibo, the joint Weibo/Xuanwu forces defeated him. Thereafter, no further relief aid would be able to come through from Hedong, and Tianping and Taining grew weaker and weaker.

In 897, Pang and Ge jointly attacked Tianping's capital Yun Prefecture (鄆州) and captured it. Zhu Xuan tried to flee but was captured and delivered to Zhu Quanzhong to be executed. Meanwhile, Zhu Jin, running low on food supplies himself, left his officer Kang Huaizhen (康懷貞) in charge of Yan and headed south with Li Chengsi and Shi to raid the former Ganhua Circuit (now renamed Wuning Circuit) for food. When Zhu Quanzhong heard this, he sent Ge to launch a surprise attack on Yan. Kang surrendered, leaving Zhu Jin without a base to return to. When he tried to head for Yi Prefecture (沂州, in modern Linyi, Shandong), the prefect Yin Chubin (尹處賓) refused to receive him. He, Shi, and Li Chengsi had to further flee to Hai Prefecture (海州, in modern Lianyungang, Jiangsu). Faced with the prospect of further Xuanwu attack, they crossed the Huai River into Huainan Circuit to submit to Huainan's military governor Yang Xingmi. Yang was very pleased, and he personally went to Gaoyou (高郵, in modern Yangzhou, Jiangsu) to welcome them. He bestowed on Zhu Jin the title of military governor of Wuning (i.e., not giving him a title that was inferior to his own) and also gave Shi and Li Chengsi honored titles. It was said that, previously, the Huainan forces were only familiar with water combat; now, with the infusion of Tianping, Taining, and Hedong army soldiers, the Huainan army's land combat capabilities were greatly enhanced. (Zhu Jin's wife was captured and initially taken by Zhu Quanzhong as a concubine, but soon thereafter, under persuasion by his wife Lady Zhang, Zhu Quanzhong allowed Zhu Jin's wife to become a Buddhist nun. Zhu Jin himself would marry the daughter of the Huainan general Tao Ya (陶雅) as his new wife sometime after he arrived in Huainan.)

== As Huainan/Wu/Hongnong general ==
The newly constituted Huainan troops would soon be under severe test. Zhu Quanzhong, having conquered Tianping and Taining, decided to make Huainan his next target, so he gathered his available forces and sent Pang Shigu with 70,000 soldiers from Xuanwu and Ganhua Circuits to Qingkou (清口, in modern Huai'an, Jiangsu), posturing to head to Huainan's capital Yang Prefecture; Ge Congzhou with the forces from Tianping and Taining Circuits to Anfeng (安豐, in modern Lu'an, Anhui), posturing to head to Shou Prefecture (壽州, in modern Lu'an); and Zhu Quanzhong himself with his main forces to Su Prefecture (宿州, in modern Suzhou). The people of Huainan Circuit were greatly shocked and dismayed by Zhu's forces. However, Pang, because he had such an impressive force, underestimated Yang Xingmi's army. Yang Xingmi had Zhu Jin serve as his advance commander, and Zhu constructed a dam on the Huai River. When Yang Xingmi attacked Pang, Zhu released the waters to flood Pang's army, and then attacked Pang with Yang. Pang's army was crushed by the waters and the Huainan forces, and Pang was killed. Zhu Yanshou also defeated Ge's army. Hearing that both of his generals had been defeated, Zhu Quanzhong also retreated. The Battle of Qingkou thus affirmed Yang's control of the territory between the Huai and the Yangtze Rivers.

In 899, Yang and Zhu Jin attacked Xu Prefecture. Zhu Quanzhong initially sent Zhang Guihou (張歸厚) to relieve the attack on Xu, and then also led an army himself. When Yang and Zhu Jin heard that Zhu Quanzhong was about to arrive, they withdrew.

In 902, after Emperor Zhaozong had been forcibly taken to Fengxiang Circuit (鳳翔, headquartered in modern Baoji, Shaanxi), then ruled by Li Maozhen, by the eunuch Han Quanhui. Zhu Quanzhong, who had been summoned to the capital Chang'an by the chancellor Cui Yin, put Fengxiang Circuit's capital Fengxiang Municipality under siege. Emperor Zhaozong sent the Zhang Yan, the son of the former chancellor Zhang Jun, on whom he bestowed the imperial clan surname of Li (and thereafter, Zhang Yan was known as Li Yan), to Huainan as an imperial emissary. Li Yan bestowed the title of supreme commander of the southeastern circuits on Yang and created him the Prince of Wu, ordering him to attack Zhu Quanzhong. As part of the order, Zhu Jin was given the title of military governor of Pinglu Circuit (平盧, headquartered in modern Weifang, Shandong) (which was then under the rule of Wang Shifan). Yang also bestowed on Zhu Jin the title of deputy supreme commander of the southeastern circuits. After Yang died in 905 and was succeeded by his son Yang Wo (who carried the title of Prince of Hongnong), Zhu Jin continued to carry the title of deputy supreme commander — a title that he continued to carry after Yang Wo was assassinated in 908 by the officers Zhang Hao and Xu Wen and succeeded by his younger brother Yang Longyan. (Xu killed Zhang soon after their assassination of Yang Wo, and while thereafter Yang Longyan was prince, Xu effectively controlled the governance of the Wu state — which was an independent by that point after Zhu Quanzhong usurped the Tang throne in 907 and established Later Liang as its Emperor Taizu, a title that Yang Wo and his successors refused to recognize.)

Around the new year 914, the Later Liang general Wang Jingren attacked Wu, to try to capture Wu's Shou and Lu (廬州, in modern Hefei, Anhui) Prefectures. Xu and Zhu Jin engaged Wang at Zhaobu (趙步, in modern Lu'an) and found themselves outnumbered, but Xu, with the assistance of the officer Chen Shao (陳紹), defeated Wang. Wang withdrew with heavy losses.

Late in 914, then-Later Liang emperor Zhu Youzhen (Zhu Quanzhong's son) tried to replace Wang Yin (王殷) the military governor of Wuning (who had been commissioned by his predecessor and older brother Zhu Yougui, who had assassinated Zhu Quanzhong and taken the throne but was soon overthrown by Zhu Youzhen) with his cousin Zhu Youzhang (朱友璋). Wang Yin, in fear, submitted to Wu and sought aid from Wu. Zhu Jin thereafter led a relief force to try to save Wang Yin, but he was intercepted and defeated by the Later Liang generals Niu Cunjie (牛存節) and Liu Xun; he thereafter withdrew. Niu and Liu thereafter captured Xu Prefecture, and Wang and his family members committed suicide.

By 916, Xu Wen, who was still in control of Wu's governance, had removed himself from Yang Prefecture and permanently stationed himself at Sheng Prefecture (昇州, in modern Nanjing, Jiangsu), leaving his oldest son Xu Zhixun in charge at Yang Prefecture. That year, the officers Ma Qian (馬謙) and Li Qiu (李球) seized Yang Longyan and launched their troops to attack Xu Zhixun. Xu Zhixun was fearful and decided to flee, but was dissuaded by the official Yan Keqiu, and their opposing camps settled in that night. The next day, Zhu Jin, who had been stationed at Run Prefecture (潤州, in modern Zhenjiang, Jiangsu). Looking at Ma's and Li's camp, Zhu assured Xu Zhixun that there was nothing to be concerned about, and he yelled at Ma's and Li's troops; in fear, Ma's and Li's troops disassembled, and they were captured and executed.

In winter 916, with Li Keyong's son and successor Li Cunxu the Prince of Jin requesting Wu to enter an alliance to jointly attack Later Liang, Xu Zhixun and Zhu Jin led troops north toward Song (宋州, in modern Shangqiu, Henan) and Bo (亳州, in modern Bozhou, Anhui) Prefectures. They crossed the Huai River and put Ying Prefecture (潁州, in modern Fuyang, Anhui) under siege. In spring 917, however, after Zhu Youzhen dispatched the general Yuan Xiangxian to aid Ying Prefecture, the Wu troops withdrew.

== Death ==
As of 918, Xu Zhixun had become so arrogant and so unreasonable in his actions that he was even openly humiliating Yang Longyan, who was his sovereign. Meanwhile, the relationship between Zhu Jin and Xu Zhixun, apparently initially cordial, had become frayed over a series of incidents — including an occasion when Xu Zhixun tried to rape one of Zhu's maid servants, and Xu Zhixun's display of displeasure over Zhu's having a greater title (deputy supreme commander) than he did. He therefore established a Jinghuai Circuit (靜淮) at Si Prefecture (泗州, in modern Huai'an) and made Zhu the military governor, to send Zhu away from the capital Guangling (i.e., Yang Prefecture). Zhu became hateful of Xu Zhixun as well, but outwardly pretended to continue to honor Xu Zhixun.

As Zhu was (outwardly) preparing to leave Jiangdu, Xu Zhixun went to bid him farewell. Zhu held a feast for him, offered him wine, had Zhu's favorite concubine come outside to greet him and sing for him, and presented Zhu's favorite horse as a gift to him. Zhu then invited him into the middle of Zhu's mansion, where Zhu's wife Lady Tao came out to greet him as well as a sign of respect. Xu Zhixun was pleased and took no further precautions, while Zhu already had his elite guards surround the hall. As Lady Tao bowed to Xu Zhixun and he bowed back, Zhu struck him and, as he fell to the ground, Zhu's elite soldiers entered and cut off his head. After Zhu took the head and showed them to Xu Zhixun's soldiers, they all fled. Zhu then entered the palace and showed the head to Yang Longyan, expecting Yang Longyan to be pleased and go along with his actions, stating to Yang Longyan, "I, your servant, have destroyed a harm to the state for Your Royal Highness." Instead, Yang Longyan responded with horror, covered his face, and stated: "You, uncle, have to bear this alone; this has nothing to do with me." (Yang Longyan referred to Zhu Jin as uncle because Yang Xingmi's wife (Zhu Yanshou's sister) was also surnamed Zhu, albeit not in reality related to Zhu Jin, although Yang Longyan was not born of Lady Zhu.) Zhu, in anger, stated, "You son of a maid cannot accomplish great things." He threw Xu Zhixun's head against a pillar, and then was ready to exit the palace. However, by this point, Xu Wen's officer Zhai Qian (翟虔) had already deployed his soldiers around the palace. Zhu tried to climb down the palace walls, but fell and broke his leg. As soldiers approached him, he stated, "I have destroyed a harm for tens of thousands of people, and I will suffer the consequences alone." He then killed himself with his sword. After his death, Xu Wen threw his body into a pond near the capital and slaughtered his family members, although later, after Xu Wen's adoptive son Xu Zhigao informed Xu Wen of the inappropriate deeds that Xu Zhixun had been carrying out, Xu Wen had Zhu's body recovered from the pond and buried.

== Notes and references ==
- Old Book of Tang, vol. 182.
- History of the Five Dynasties, vol. 13.
- New History of the Five Dynasties, vol. 42.
- Spring and Autumn Annals of the Ten Kingdoms, vol. 8.
- Zizhi Tongjian, vols. 256, 257, 258, 259, 260, 261, 263, 266, 269, 270.
