= Southern Wu =

Southern Wu may refer to

- Southern branch of Wu Chinese languages
- Yang Wu, a state in China
