= Zhang Xiu =

Zhang Xiu may refer to:

- Zhang Xiu (warlord) (張繡; died 207), minor warlord of the late Han Dynasty
- Zhang Xiu (Eastern Wu) (張休), Eastern Wu official in the Three Kingdoms period, son of Zhang Zhao
- Li Yan (Wu) (李儼; died 918), né Zhang Xiu (張休), Tang Dynasty official
