= Li Yan (Yang Wu) =

Chinese emissary

Li Yan (李儼) (died 918), né Zhang Xiu (張休) and later Zhang Bo (張播), was an emissary that Emperor Zhaozong of Tang sent to the warlord Yang Xingmi the military governor (Jiedushi) of Huainan Circuit (淮南, headquartered in modern Yangzhou, Jiangsu) in 902, who would remain at Huainan Circuit as the Tang emperor's representative even after Tang's eventual destruction in 907. He would be the one who formally bestowed Yang Xingmi's sons and successors Yang Wo and Yang Longyan with their formal titles on behalf of the Tang emperor during the initial years of the Yang family-ruled state of Yang Wu (also known as Hongnong). In 918, after the general Zhu Jin assassinated Xu Zhixun the son of Yang Wu's regent Xu Wen, Xu Wen believed that Li was complicit in Zhu's plot and put him to death.

== Background ==
It is not known when Li Yan was born. He was originally named Zhang Xiu, and later also became known as Zhang Bo, and was a younger, if not youngest, son of the chancellor Zhang Jun. Because of his father‘s heritage, he came to serve in the imperial government during the reign of Emperor Zhaozong, initially serving as a copyeditor (校書郎, Xiaoshulang) at the Palace Library, eventually becoming a general of the imperial guards.

== As Emperor Zhaozong's emissary ==
=== During Tang Dynasty ===
As of 902, Emperor Zhaozong was at Fengxiang Circuit (鳳翔, headquartered in modern Baoji, Shaanxi), having been forcibly taken there by the powerful eunuchs, led by Han Quanhui, as the eunuchs feared a general slaughter by Emperor Zhaozong and the chancellor Cui Yin. (Fengxiang was then under the rule of the eunuch's ally Li Maozhen.) Cui summoned his ally, the major warlord Zhu Quanzhong the military governor of Xuanwu Circuit (宣武, headquartered in modern Kaifeng, Henan) to put Fengxiang's capital Fengxiang Municipality under siege. In 902, Emperor Zhaozong, perhaps at the eunuchs' behest, gave Zhang Bo the imperial clan surname of Li and the new name of Yan, sending Li Yan as his personal representative to Huainan Circuit to commission its military governor Yang Xingmi as the supreme commander of the southeastern circuits, honorary chancellor title of Zhongshu Ling (中書令), and the Prince of Wu and ordering him to organize a major attack on Zhu's territory. The bestowment also granted Yang permission to exercise imperial powers in the emperor's absence. Part of Li Yan's mission was also to bestow various honors on Yang's subordinates Zhu Jin and Zhu Yanshou, as well as on the independent warlords Feng Hongduo (then ruling the Shangyuan (上元, in modern Nanjing, Jiangsu) region) and Ma Yin (then the military governor of Wu'an Circuit (武安, headquartered in modern Changsha, Hunan), apparently hoping that Feng and Ma would join Yang's attack on Zhu. (Feng and Ma, however, did not, although Feng would soon be defeated, and his territory absorbed into that of, Yang's subordinate Tian Jun the military governor of Ningguo Circuit (寧國, headquartered in modern Xuancheng, Anhui).) Yang did launch an attack on Zhu later in 902, but, running into food supply issues, withdrew shortly after. It was said that, after Li Yan bestowed on him the imperial authorities, Yang, while establishing an office to issue edicts on the emperor's behalf, would nevertheless inform Li Yan and present the proposed edicts to a statute of Emperor Zhaozong's ancestor Emperor Xuanzong before issuing them.

In 903, Zhu, who at that point had prevailed over Li Maozhen, forced Li Maozhen to surrender the emperor to him to sue for peace, and slaughtered the eunuchs, was planning on seizing the imperial throne eventually. He feared that Li Yan's father Zhang Jun, who had by that point retired to his estate in Changshui (長水, in modern Luoyang, Henan), would incite the regional governors to rise against him, and therefore had the entire family killed. Only Li Yan's older brother Zhang Ge escaped to Xichuan Circuit (西川, headquartered in modern Chengdu, Sichuan).

In 905, Yang Xingmi died. His subordinates met with Li Yan and requested Li Yan to bestow on his son and designated successor Yang Wo the titles of military governor of Huainan, supreme commander of the southeastern circuits, honorary chancellor title of Shizhong (侍中), and Prince of Hongnong — a lesser title to Yang Xingmi's Prince of Wu title. Li Yan did so.

=== During Hongnong/Yang Wu ===
In 907, Zhu Quanzhong had Emperor Zhaozong's son and successor Emperor Ai yield the throne to him, ending Tang and starting a new Later Liang with him as its Emperor Taizu. Several regional governors, including Yang Wo, Li Maozhen, Li Keyong the military governor of Hedong Circuit (河東, headquartered in modern Taiyuan, Shanxi), and Wang Jian the military governor of Xichuan, refused to recognize the Later Liang emperor. Wang Jian founded his own state of Former Shu, while Yang, Li Maozhen, and Li Keyong theoretically remained vassals of the defunct Tang state, but were in effect sovereigns of their own separate states (Hongnong, Qi, and Jin respectively).

In 908, Yang Wo was assassinated by his guard commanders Zhang Hao and Xu Wen, who declared his younger brother Yang Longyan the new Prince of Hongnong. Xu soon killed Zhang and took over as regent of the Hongnong state. Under the requests of the Hongnong officials, Li Yan, still serving as Emperor Zhaozong's representative, bestowed on Yang Longyan the titles of military governor of Huainan, the supreme commander of the eastern circuits, honorary chancellor title of Tong Zhongshu Menxia Pingzhangshi (同中書門下平章事), and Prince of Hongnong.

In 910, Wan Quangan (萬全感), the emissary that Yang Longyan sent to Qi to deliver the news of Yang Wo's death, returned to Hongnong, and declared that Li Maozhen had, in the name of the Tang emperor, bestowed on Yang Longyan the title of Zhongshu Ling and ordered that he inherit Yang Xingmi's greater title of Prince of Wu. Yang Longyan accepted and declared a general pardon within Wu territory. Still, apparently believing that this was insufficiently formal, in 912, Xu, along with the senior Wu generals Liu Wei (劉威) and Tao Ya (陶雅), went to see Li Yan and requested that he, as Emperor Zhaozong's representative, bestow the Prince of Wu title on Yang Longyan and also give him the title of Taishi (太師, one of the Three Excellencies). Li Yan did so.

By 918, Xu had left the Wu capital Guangling (廣陵, in modern Yangzhou) and was taking up defensive position at Sheng Prefecture (昇州, i.e., Shangyuan), leaving his son Xu Zhixun as the junior regent at Guangling, overseeing the policy decisions of the Wu government. Xu Zhixun, however, was arrogant and violent, alienating the other Wu officials and generals, including Zhu Jin, who, as titularly the deputy supreme commander of the circuits, carried a higher position than Xu Zhixun, formally. Xu Zhixun tried to send Zhu out of the capital by making him the military governor of a new Jinghuai Circuit (靜淮, headquartered at modern Huai'an, Jiangsu). Zhu, angered, assassinated him but then committed suicide after being cornered by Xu Wen's subordinate Zhai Qian (翟虔). By that point, Li Yan had been residing at Hailing (海陵, in modern Taizhou, Jiangsu) and was said to be in poverty. As he was friendly with Zhu, Xu Wen believed that he was complicit in Zhu's assassination of Xu Zhixun, and so had Li executed, along with the general Mi Zhicheng (米志誠), whom he also suspected of collaborating with Zhu. It was said that the people, knowing that Li was not involved, lamented his death.

== Notes and references ==
- Spring and Autumn Annals of the Ten Kingdoms (十國春秋), vol. 8.
- Zizhi Tongjian, vols. 263, 265, 266, 268, 270.
