= Xu Wen =

Chinese regent (862–927)

Xu Wen 徐溫
- Born: 862
- Died: 927 (aged 64–65)
- Spouse: Lady Bai; Lady Li, Empress Mingde; Lady Chen
- Issue: Xu Zhixun; Xu Zhixun, Prince Kang of Donghai; Xu Zhihui; Xu Zhijian; Xu Zhizheng; Xu Zhi'e; Princess Guangde; Li Bian (adopted)
Posthumous name
- Emperor Wu (武皇帝)
Temple name
- Taizu (太祖), later Yizu (義祖)

Xu Wen (Chinese: 徐溫) (862 – November 20, 927), courtesy name Dunmei (敦美), formally Prince Zhongwu of Qi (齊忠武王), later further posthumously honored Emperor Wu (武皇帝) with the temple name Yizu (義祖) by his adoptive son Xu Zhigao after Xu Zhigao founded the state of Southern Tang, was a major general and regent of the Chinese Five Dynasties and Ten Kingdoms period state Wu. He took over the reins of the Wu state (then also known as Hongnong) after assassinating, with his colleague Zhang Hao, Yang Wo, the first Prince of Hongnong, and then killing Zhang. Xu was in essence the decision-maker throughout the reign of Yang Wo's brother and successor Yang Longyan and the first part of the reign of Yang Longyan's brother and successor Yang Pu. After his death, Xu Zhigao inherited his position as regent, eventually seizing the Wu throne and establishing Southern Tang.

== Background ==
Xu Wen was born in 862, during the reign of Emperor Yizong of Tang. His family was from Qushan (朐山, in modern Lianyungang, Jiangsu). When he was young, he was a salt privateer. His parents' names were lost to history, although it is known that his mother was surnamed Zhou. At some point, he became a soldier under Yang Xingmi, who was then the prefect of Lu Prefecture (廬州, in modern Hefei, Anhui).

== Service under Yang Xingmi ==
Xu Wen initially did not distinguish himself in Yang Xingmi's campaigns — as while there were 36 officers under Yang who were considered to have distinguished themselves, led by Liu Wei (劉威) and Tao Ya (陶雅), Xu was not among them. His first known act while serving under Yang was in 889, during Yang's lengthy struggle against Sun Ru for the control of Huainan Circuit (淮南, headquartered in modern Yangzhou, Jiangsu), when Yang captured Xuan Prefecture (宣州, in modern Xuancheng, Anhui) after a lengthy siege. It was said that the other officers all hunted for spoils in gold and silk, but only Xu found a food supply, and had porridge cooked and distributed to the hungry people of Xuan Prefecture.

In 895, when Yang, who had by that point taken Huainan and was serving as its military governor (Jiedushi), captured Hao Prefecture (濠州, in modern Chuzhou, Anhui), the soldiers captured a seven-year-old child, whom Yang initially took into his household. However, Yang's oldest son Yang Wo disliked the child, and Yang decided to give the child to Xu; Xu named the child Xu Zhigao and had his second wife Lady Li raise the child as hers. As Xu Zhigao was said to be diligent and filially pious, Xu Wen loved him.

Xu first distinguished himself in Yang's eyes in 902 when Yang was planning a major campaign against Zhu Quanzhong the military governor of Xuanwu Circuit (宣武, headquartered in modern Kaifeng, Henan). During the planning, most officers advocated using large ships to ship food supplies for the army, but Xu opposed, pointing out that the canals that would be utilized had long been silted and would be difficult to pass; he instead advocating using small boats for easy passage. He was not listened to, but when subsequently, Yang's army was hampered by the failure for large ships to arrive with food supplies (while smaller supply ships were getting through) and forced to withdraw, Yang became impressed with Xu and decided to give him greater responsibilities.

The first instance where Xu was recorded to have distinguished himself in battle was in 903, when Yang was facing rebellions by his subordinates Tian Jun the military governor of Ningguo Circuit (寧國, headquartered at Xuan Prefecture) and An Renyi (安仁義) the military prefect of Run Prefecture (潤州, in modern Zhenjiang, Jiangsu). Yang initially sent Wang Maozhang to attack An at Run Prefecture, but Wang could not defeat An. He sent Xu to reinforce Wang's army, and Xu had his soldiers change into identical uniforms as Wang's. An, not knowing that reinforcements had arrived, had no reservations about reengaging Wang's army, and was defeated by Xu. (However, Run Prefecture did not fall at this time.) However, Xu's role became even more prominent when, later in the year, Yang received word that his brother-in-law Zhu Yanshou (the brother of his wife Lady Zhu) had agreed to join Tian's and An's rebellion and was set to rebel at Shou Prefecture (壽州, in modern Lu'an, Anhui). Xu, advised by his guest Yan Keqiu, submitted a proposal to Yang to trick Zhu Yanshou by having Yang pretend to be blind, even before Lady Zhu, and then issuing an order to summon Zhu Yanshou back from Shou Prefecture under the pretense of entrusting the affairs of the circuit to him. Zhu Yanshou believed this to be true and returned to Huainan's capital Yang Prefecture (揚州), where he was killed in an ambush that Yang had Xu lay for him. After Zhu's death, Yang made Xu one of his two guard commanders.

In 904, when Tai Meng (臺濛) the governor (觀察使, Guanchashi) of Xuan Prefecture died, Yang Xingmi commissioned Yang Wo to be the governor of Xuan. Xu privately spoke with Yang Wo, stating:

The Prince [(i.e., Yang Xingmi, who then carried the title of Prince of Wu as bestowed by Emperor Xizong's brother and successor Emperor Zhaozong)] is chronically-ill, but his oldest heir is being sent out to another circuit. This must be according to plan of some treacherous subjects. If you receive an order summoning you back, unless it is through a messenger that I send with the Prince's own writing, be careful and do not return.

Yang Wo, believing Xu was advising him out of good faith, wept and thanked him. In 905, when Yang Xingmi became even more ill, he was set on summoning Yang Wo back from Xuan Prefecture and entrusting the affairs of the circuit to him. Yang Xingmi's secretary Zhou Yin (周隱), however, citing Yang Wo's frivolousness, opposed, instead suggesting that Yang Xingmi entrust the circuit to Liu Wei with a promise from Liu to transfer it to another son of Yang Xingmi's. Xu and the other guard commander, Zhang Hao, however, opposed Zhou's proposal, pointing out that Yang had fought these years to leave the state to his family. When Yang Xingmi subsequently issued an order and ordered Zhou to dispatch it to Yang Wo, Zhou did not send it for some time; when Xu and Yan found Yang Xingmi's order still on Zhou's desk, they took it and had it delivered to Yang Wo, who subsequently returned to Yang Prefecture. Yang Xingmi subsequently died, and Yang Wo, with the title of Prince of Hongnong bestowed by Emperor Zhaozong's emissary Li Yan, took over the circuit.

== Service under Yang Wo ==
After Yang Wo annexed Zhennan Circuit (鎮南, headquartered in modern Nanchang, Jiangxi) in 906, he became increasingly arrogant and intolerant. He executed Zhou Yin, which caused fear to permeate among his staff members. Despite being still in the mourning period for Yang Xingmi, he spent his time, day and night, in feast and games. When Xu Wen and Zhang Hao tried to tearfully dissuade him from such behavior, he angrily stated to them, "If you believe that I am not capable enough, why do you not kill me and take over yourselves?" This caused them to be fearful as well. They thus planned to act against Yang Wo. They first sent three officers who commanded Yang Wo's personal army (which he brought back from Xuan Prefecture), Zhu Siqing (朱思勍), Fan Sicong (范思從), and Chen Fan (陳璠) to join under the general Qin Pei (秦裴) in Qin's operations to pacify Zhennan, and then sent an officer, Chen You (陳祐) to execute them at Qin's camp under false charges of treason. When Yang Wo heard of this, he prepared to kill Xu and Zhang, but before he could act, they acted first. In spring 907, they took 200 guards under their command into the mansion, claiming to be carrying out bingjian (兵諫, i.e., "correction by force"). They executed a group of Yang Wo's close associates and then, while not physically acting against Yang Wo himself, effectively took control of the headquarters. If other officers disagreed with them, they found reasons to execute those officers.

Later in 907, the powerful warlord Zhu Quanzhong the military governor of Xuanwu Circuit (宣武, headquartered in modern Kaifeng, Henan) forced Emperor Zhaozong's son and successor Emperor Ai to yield the throne to him, ending Tang and starting a new Later Liang with Zhu as its Emperor Taizu. Yang Wo, along with Li Keyong the Prince of Jin, Li Maozhen the Prince of Qi, and Wang Jian the Prince of Shu, did not recognize the new Later Liang emperor as emperor, and continued to use the Tang era name of Tianyou. Without a Tang emperor, however, he was in effect the ruler of a new state of Hongnong.

However, Xu and Zhang remained in effective control of the headquarters, and Yang Wo was hoping to, but unable to, eliminate them. They considered their own positions precarious, however, and they resolved to kill Yang Wo, divide the domain between themselves, and then submit to Later Liang. On June 9, 908, Zhang sent his subordinate Ji Xiang (紀祥) into Yang Wo's mansion with soldiers under Zhang's command and killed him in his bedroom. (The reason why only Zhang's soldiers were used was that Xu pointed out that if they mixed soldiers, the soldiers may not cooperate with each other, and Zhang did not want to let Xu's soldiers conduct the assassination.) Zhang and Xu subsequently declared that Yang Wo had died of a sudden illness. When Zhang postured at taking over command of the domain, however, Yan Keqiu spoke up against it and subsequently produced a document, which he claimed to be from Yang Wo's mother Lady Dowager Shi, pleading for allegiance of the officers behind her younger son Yang Longyan. Zhang, rebuffed in his attempt to directly take over, acquiesced and allowed Yang Longyan to take the throne as the new Prince of Hongnong.

== Service under Yang Longyan ==
Subsequently, Zhang Hao tried to send Xu Wen out of the headquarters to be the governor of Zhexi Circuit (浙西, headquartered in modern Zhenjiang, Jiangsu), but Yan Keqiu persuaded Xu and Li Chengsi (李承嗣) the deputy military governor of Huainan that Zhang was intending to eliminate them and starting by sending Xu out of the capital; Xu thereafter found excuses to stay at Yang Prefecture. After Zhang then failed in an assassination attempt against Yan, Yan and Xu plotted to overthrow him. Xu subsequently got the officer Zhong Taizhang (鍾泰章) to join the plot. On the night of June 18, Zhong took his soldiers and entered headquarters, killing Zhang and his close associates. Xu then blamed the assassination of Yang Wo on Zhang alone, and effectively took over as Yang Longyan's regent as the sole commander of the guards. He entrusted the military matters to Yan and the financial matters to Luo Zhixiang (駱知祥), and it was said that both Yan and Luo were capable at their jobs, allowing Hongnong to be governed well. Xu himself was said to be calm, resolute, and frugal. While he was illiterate, when he had to rule on legal matters, he would have others read the legal papers to him before ruling on them with proper reasoning.

As of 909, Xu was also carrying the title of deputy commander of the Huainan army (行軍副使, Xingjun Fushi) when he, believing that Jinling was a key location to control the Yangtze River with a fleet, gave himself the additional title of prefect of Sheng Prefecture (昇州, i.e., Jinling) but sent Xu Zhigao there to actually take command of the fleet there. Later that year, when Wei Quanfeng the prefect of Fu Prefecture (撫州, in modern Fuzhou, Jiangxi), who had nominally submitted to both Hongnong and Later Liang, rose against Hongnong and claimed the title of military governor of Zhennan, Xu, at Yan's recommendation, sent Zhou Ben against Wei. Subsequently, Zhou defeated and captured Wei, allowing Hongnong to take Fu Prefecture under actual control.

In 910, the Hongong emissary to Qi and Jin (to announce Yang Wo's death), Wan Quangan (萬全感), returned to Yang Prefecture, and announced that Li Maozhen had, in his capacity as representative of the Tang emperor, bestowed the titles of Prince of Wu and Zhongshu Ling (中書令) on Yang Longyan. Yang Longyan accepted those titles; thereafter, Hongnong was known as Wu.

Also in 910, Xu's mother Lady Zhou died. When the officers prepared for her funeral, they built a large wooden statue and covered it with silk, intending to burn it as a sacrifice to the gods. Xu pointed out that the silk could be given to the poor and did so, rather than burning the silk. He formally left governmental service to observe a mourning period for her, but shortly after, Yang Longyan formally recalled him to governmental service and made him the commander of the Huainan armed forces and governor of Run Prefecture (潤州, i.e., the capital of Zhexi).

Meanwhile, Xu's hold on power brought resentment from a number of Yang Xingmi's old officers — Liu Wei, who was then the military governor of Zhennan; Tao Ya, who was then the governor of She Prefecture (歙州, in modern Huangshan, Anhui); Li Yu (李遇), who was then the governor of Xuan Prefecture; and Li Jian (李簡), who was then the prefect of Chang Prefecture (常州, in modern Changzhou, Jiangsu). Li Yu was particularly vocal in his objections to Xu's regency. In 912, Xu tried to have Xu Jie convince Li Yu to come to Yang Prefecture to pay homage to Yang Longyan, but Li Yu, after initially agreeing, refused and accused Xu of murdering Yang Wo after Xu Jie offended him. Xu Wen, in anger, announced a campaign against Li Yu, with Chai Zaiyong (柴再用) commanding the army against Li Yu and Xu Zhigao serving as Chai's deputy. He arrested Li Yu's youngest son, who was serving as a Huainan officer, and sent Li Yu's son to the front to show to Li Yu. He then sent the official He Rao (何蕘) to persuade Li Yu to surrender. After Li Yu did so, however, Xu ordered Chai to kill Li Yu and his family. It was said that after this incident, the other officers did not dare to oppose Xu any further.

Meanwhile, Xu was hearing rumors that Liu was also planning on resisting him, and prepared for a campaign against Liu. Liu tried to deflect the suspicion by heading to Yang Prefecture, along with Tao, to pay homage to Yang Longyan. Xu treated both Liu and Tao with respect, with ceremonial greetings that would have been due to Yang Xingmi, and further granted them additional titles. He, along with Liu and Tao, then visited Li Yan and requested that Li Yan formally bestow on Yang Longyan the title of Prince of Wu, to make it even more formal than Li Maozhen's commission. Xu himself received the titles of military governor of Zhenhai (i.e., Zhexi) and the honorary chancellor designation of Tong Zhongshu Menxia Pingzhangshi (同中書門下平章事), as well as the commander of Huainan armed forces. He then returned Liu and Tao to their posts, to show that he did not suspect them.

In 913, Qian Liu, the Prince of Wuyue (Wu's neighbor to the southeast), sent his sons Qian Chuanguan, Qian Chuanliao (錢傳鐐), and Qian Chuanying (錢傳瑛) to attack Chang Prefecture. Xu himself went to the front to combat Wuyue forces and repelled them.

Later in 913, the Later Liang general Wang Jingren launched a major attack against Wu, heading for Shou and Lu Prefectures. Xu and Zhu Jin led the Wu army against him and defeated him, inflicting great casualties on the Later Liang army.

In 915, Xu commissioned his oldest son Xu Zhixun (elder) as deputy commander of the Huainan forces, and then had himself made the commander of the operations against Wuyue as well as acting Shizhong (侍中), stationing himself at Run Prefecture and leaving Xu Zhixun at Yang Prefecture to govern the general affairs of the state, effectively serving as its junior regent, while he himself still ruled on major matters. Xu Wen was also created the Duke of Qi. In 917, he moved his headquarters to Sheng Prefecture and moved Xu Zhigao to be the military prefect of Run Prefecture.

Over the next few years, Xu Zhixun gained additional powers gradually, but, unknown to Xu Wen, was acting arrogantly toward other officers and even toward Yang Longyan, formally his sovereign. In 915, Unhappy that Zhu Jin, who carried the title of deputy supreme commander of all armed forces (with Yang Longyan himself carrying the title of supreme commander of all armed forces) and therefore formally a greater position than his own, he established a Jinghuai Circuit (靜淮) at Si Prefecture (泗州, in modern Huai'an, Jiangsu), making Zhu its military governor to send Zhu out of the capital. Zhu, incensed, pretended to be ready to give Xu Zhixun his favorite horse. When Xu Zhixun visited Zhu's mansion to receive the horse, Zhu assassinated him, but Zhu's subsequent attempt to get Yang Longyan on his side failed, and with the guards, commanded by Xu's subordinate Zhai Qian (翟虔), surrounding him, Zhu committed suicide. Xu Zhigao, whose Run Prefecture was just across the Yangtze from Yang Prefecture, quickly headed for Yang Prefecture to calm the city. Xu Wen himself subsequently arrived and, believing that Li Yan and the general Mi Zhicheng (米志誠) to be complicit with Zhu, killed them. He further considered slaughter all of the officers that he suspected of being in league with Zhu, but after Xu Zhigao and Yan reported to Xu Wen how Xu Zhixun's arrogance had alienated all of the officers, Xu Wen stopped pursuing the matter. With all his other sons still young, he had Xu Zhigao remain at Yang Prefecture to replace Xu Zhixun as junior regent, while he himself returned to Sheng Prefecture.

Meanwhile, Xu had ordered the general Liu Xin (劉信) to attack Tan Quanbo the military governor of Baisheng Circuit (百勝, headquartered in modern Ganzhou, Jiangxi) — who nominally submitted to both Wu and Later Liang — to try to take Baisheng under control. Liu was able to repel relief forces from Later Liang's vassals Wuyue, Chu's prince Ma Yin, and Min's prince Wang Shenzhi, but unable to capture Baisheng's capital Qian Prefecture (虔州) itself initially. He thus made a peace agreement with Tan. When Liu reported this to Xu, however, Xu was incensed, and, after giving 3,000 soldiers to Liu's son Liu Yingyan (劉英彥), stated to Liu Yingyan, "Your father is upstream from here, but could not even capture one city with soldiers 10 times the number of defenders. Clearly, he intends treason. Take this army and commit treason with your father!" When Liu Yingyan arrived at Liu Xin's camp and relayed what Xu stated, Liu Xin became fearful, and again put Qian Prefecture under siege. Qian Prefecture fell, and Liu took Tan captive, allowing Wu to take over Baisheng.

Meanwhile, Xu, under advice from Yan Keqiu, who pointed out that, with Later Liang suffering repeated losses at the hands of Li Keyong's son and successor Li Cunxu, who was posturing at claiming imperial title as a new Tang emperor and that Wu, which still at that point remained a Tang vassal, needed to assert its own political independence, began to try to persuade Yang Longyan to claim imperial title first. In 919, Yang Longyan, while refusing to claim imperial title, claimed the greater title of King of Wu and began to take on imperial trappings. Xu Wen was given the titles of prime minister (大丞相, Da Chengxiang), overseer of all military matters (都督中外總軍事, Dudu Zhongwai Zongjunshi), supreme commander of the circuits, military governor of Zhenhai and Ningguo, acting Taiwei (太尉, one of the Three Excellencies), Zhongshu Ling (中書令), and Prince of Donghai.

Later in the year, Wuyue again launched a major attack on Chang Prefecture. Xu personally led the armed forces and, despite his being ill at the time, defeated Wuyue forces at Wuxi and captured many Wuyue soldiers. In the aftermaths of the victory, Xu Zhigao advocated attacking and trying to capture Su Prefecture (蘇州, in modern Suzhou, Jiangsu). However, Xu Wen, stating that he wanted the people to rest, decided to release the Wuyue soldiers and get Qian Liu to commit to a long-term peace. Qian agreed, and also released previously captured Wu soldiers back to Wu. It was said that for the next 20 years there was no warfare between Wu and Wuyue. Meanwhile, both Xu Wen and Yang Longyan wrote Qian to try to persuade him to declare independence from Later Liang as well, to no avail. Meanwhile, Xu heard that Yang Longyan's younger brother Yang Meng the Duke of Lujiang was lamenting the Yang clan's loss of power, and became apprehensive of Yang Meng; he thus sent Yang Meng out of the capital to serve as the military prefect of Chu Prefecture (楚州, in modern Huai'an).

It was said that, despite his declaring independence under Xu's advice, Yang Longyan was actually displeased about doing so, and after doing so, he began to drink in excess and became ill. In 920, with Yang Longyan becoming seriously ill, Xu Wen returned to Yang Prefecture. Some of his subordinates suggested that he take the throne himself, but he rejected the suggestion. Instead, bypassing Yang Meng, he issued an order in Yang Longyan's name welcoming Yang Meng's younger brother Yang Pu the Duke of Danyang to serve formally as regent. When Yang Longyan subsequently died, Yang Pu took the throne as king.

== Service under Yang Pu ==
In 921, at Xu Wen's urging, Yang Pu offered sacrifices to Heaven to further show his status as an independent ruler. (When officials objected that such a ceremony cost too much money, Xu pointed out the necessity of it but agreed that the traditional Tang ceremonies were too wasteful and had ceremonies conducted in a much more frugal manner.)

In 923, Li Cunxu claimed imperial title as the emperor of Tang (establishing Later Tang as its Emperor Zhuangzong). With Later Tang and Later Liang poised for a final confrontation, the new Later Tang emperor invited Wu forces to jointly launch a major attack against Later Liang with him. Xu initially considered sending a fleet north but not commit it to battle yet, waiting to see which side would prevail. Yan Keqiu pointed out that such a position would be untenable if Later Liang then asked for aid, as he would then have to commit to a position anyway. Xu thus stopped his plan.

Later in the year, Later Tang forces captured the Later Liang capital Daliang in a surprise attack. Later Liang's last emperor Zhu Zhen (Emperor Taizu's son and successor) committed suicide, ending Later Liang. When Later Tang notified both Wu and Former Shu (then ruled by Wang Jian's son and successor Wang Zongyan) of his victory, both states were terrified, and Xu initially complained to Yan that he should not have dissuaded Xu from the joint attack plan. Yan pointed out that Later Tang's Emperor Zhuangzong had grown arrogant in his victory and had lost proper ways of governance, so he believed that within a few years the Later Tang emperor would lose his reign. Meanwhile, when the Later Tang emissary delivered Emperor Zhuangzong's communique as an edict (i.e., treating Wu as a subordinate), Wu officials refused to receive it. Emperor Zhuangzong, not yet wanting to break with Wu, instead resent his communique as a letter (i.e., treating Wu as an equal state) that started with the greeting of, "The letter of the emperor of the great Tang to the lord of Wu." Wu's return communique started with the greeting of, "The respectful letter of the lord of the great Wu to the emperor of the great Tang," to show respect and yet equality. (Yan's predictions would come true in 926, when Emperor Zhuangzong's killing of several generals and inattentiveness to his soldiers provoked a major rebellion, led by his adoptive brother Li Siyuan; Emperor Zhuangzong was killed, and Li Siyuan then took the throne as Emperor Mingzong.)

Also in 923, after Zhong Taizhang, then serving as the military prefect of Shou Prefecture, was accused of embezzling funds from the sale of official horses. Xu Zhigao had the official Wang Ren (王稔) replace Zhong and demoted Zhong to the post of prefect of Rao Prefecture (饒州, in modern Shangrao, Jiangxi). Xu Wen himself had Zhong interrogated at Jinling, but when Zhong refused to defend himself, released him. Xu Zhigao wanted to further punish Zhong, but Xu Wen, pointing out that without Zhong, he would have died at Zhang Hao's hands, refused. Rather, he had Xu Zhigao's son Xu Jingtong marry Zhong's daughter to try to resolve the hard feelings.

Meanwhile, Zhai Qian, as Xu Wen's close associate and Yang Pu's palace guards, had been keeping a close watch on the king. When Xu went to pay homage to Yang Pu in 924, Yang Pu politely, but firmly, objected to Zhai's doing so, stating that while he knew that Xu was loyal to Wu, Zhai was acting in excess of his authority. Xu apologized to the king and initially offered to put Zhai to death. Yang Pu instead suggested exile, so Zhai was exiled to Fu Prefecture.

In 926, Qian Liu was ill and went to his home town Yijin Base (衣錦軍, in modern Hangzhou) to recuperate, leaving his son Qian Chuanguan in charge of the affairs of state. Xu Wen sent an emissary to wish him well, and initially, Qian Liu's attendants advised him not to meet with the Wu emissary. Qian Liu, believing that Xu was intending to launch an attack if he were seriously ill, decided to meet with the emissary to show that he was not seriously ill. After the meeting, Xu decided not to attack Wuyue.

After the death of Later Tang's Emperor Zhuangzong and the succession of Emperor Mingzong, Gao Jixing, the ruler of Later Tang's vassal state Jingnan, turned more independent. In 927, he seized horses that Emperor Mingzong was awarding to Ma Yin and offered to submit to Wu as a subject. Xu, deciding that having Jingnan as a vassal was impractical due to the long distance between Jingnan and Wu proper (whereas Jingnan was close to Later Tang's capital Luoyang), declined to accept Gao as a vassal.

Throughout the years, many of Xu's advisors, including Yan, Chen Yanqian (陳彥謙), and Xu Jie, had long advocated having Xu Wen replace Xu Zhigao as junior regent with one of his biological sons, and the oldest surviving among them, Xu Zhixun (younger), also had long requested to replace Xu Zhigao. Xu Wen did not have the heart to do so due to Xu Zhigao's diligence and filial piety. In 927, however, Xu Wen made up his mind to do so, so he prepared to head to Jiangdu (i.e., Yang Prefecture) to pay homage to Yang Pu and persuade Yang Pu to claim imperial title, and then carry out the replacement. As he was about to depart Jinling, however, he grew ill, so he wrote a petition urging Yang Pu to take imperial title and had the younger Xu Zhixun prepare to deliver it to Jiangdu, and then remain there to take Xu Zhigao's place. When Xu Zhigao heard this, he knew he could not resist his father, so drafted a petition asking to be made the military governor of Zhennan. However, before the younger Xu Zhixun could arrive at Jiangdu, Xu Wen died, forcing the younger Xu Zhixun to immediately return to Jinling, and Xu Zhigao remained as regent. Yang Pu posthumously created Xu Wen the Prince of Qi. After Xu Zhigao eventually seized the Wu throne and established Southern Tang, while he changed his name to Li Bian, he honored Xu Wen as Emperor Wu with the temple name of Yizu.

== Personal information ==
- Mother
  - Lady Zhou (died 910)
- Wives
  - Lady Bai
  - Lady Li, posthumously honored as Empress Mingde (honored 939), adoptive mother of Xu Zhigao
- Major Concubine
  - Lady Chen
- Children
  - Xu Zhixun (elder) (徐知訓; Xú Zhīxùn) (killed by Zhu Jin 918)
  - Xu Zhixun (younger) (徐知詢; Xú Zhīxún) (died 934), Prince Kang of Donghai
  - Xu Zhihui (徐知誨)
  - Xu Zhijian (徐知諫) (died 931)
  - Xu Zhizheng (徐知證), initially created the Prince of Jiang (created 937), later the Prince of Wei
  - Xu Zhi'e (徐知諤) (905-939), initially created the Prince of Rao (created 937), later the Prince Huai of Liang
  - Princess Guangde, wife of Li Jianxun (李建勳)
- Adoptive Child
  - Xu Zhigao (徐知誥), later Emperor Liezu of Southern Tang under the name Li Bian (李昪)

== Notes and references ==
- New History of the Five Dynasties, vol. 61.
- Zizhi Tongjian, vols. 258, 260, 263, 264, 265, 266, 267, 268, 269, 270, 271, 272, 273, 274, 275, 276.
- Spring and Autumn Annals of the Ten Kingdoms (十國春秋), vol. 13.
