= Yang Longyan =

Prince of Wu from 910 to 920

Emperor Gaozu of Yang Wu 楊吳高祖
- Prince of Wu

Prince of Wu (吳王)
- Reign: 910 – June 17, 920
- Predecessor: Proclaimed the prince of Wu
- Successor: Yang Pu
- Regent: Xu Wen

Commandery Prince of Hongnong (弘農郡王)
- Reign: June 10, 908 – 910
- Predecessor: Yang Wo
- Successor: Proclaimed the prince of Wu
- Regent: Zhang Hao (908); Xu Wen
- Born: 897
- Died: June 17, 920 (Aged 22–23)
- Burial: Su Mausoleum (肅陵; presumptively in modern Yizheng, Jiangsu)
Full name
- Family name: Yáng (楊); Given name: Initially Yíng (瀛), later Lóngyǎn (隆演); or Wèi (渭)
Era dates
- Tianyou (天祐): 908 – May 3, 919; Wǔyì (武義): May 3, 919 – 921
Posthumous name
- Prince Xuān (宣王) (initially; lit. "responsible") later Emperor Xuan (宣皇帝) (honored by Yang Pu)
Temple name
- Gāozǔ (高祖) (honored by Yang Pu)
- Dynasty: Yang Wu

Yang Longyan (楊隆演) (897 – June 17, 920), né Yang Ying (楊瀛), also known as Yang Wei (楊渭), courtesy name Hongyuan (鴻源), also known by his temple name as the Emperor Gaozu of Yang Wu (楊吳高祖), was a monarch of the Yang Wu dynasty of China during the Five Dynasties and Ten Kingdoms period, reigning initially as the Commandery Prince of Hongnong and later as the Prince of Wu. Throughout his reign, the governance of the Yang Wu state was under the effective control of the regent Xu Wen.

== Background ==
Yang Longyan was born in 897, during the reign of Emperor Zhaozong of Tang; he was the second son of Yang Xingmi, who, by the time of his birth, was a major warlord as the military governor (Jiedushi) of Huainan Circuit (淮南, headquartered in modern Yangzhou, Jiangsu). His mother was Yang Xingmi's concubine Lady Shi, who was also the mother of his older brother Yang Wo. (Yang Longyan's four younger brothers all appear to be born of different mothers; Yang Pu was known to be born of Lady Wang, while the mothers of the other three brothers were lost to history.) After Yang Xingmi's death in 905, Yang Wo inherited his domain and carried the title of Prince of Hongnong.

In 908, Yang Wo — whose Hongnong state was effectively an independent state after rival warlord Zhu Quanzhong had seized the Tang throne in 907 and established a new Later Liang as its Emperor Taizu but whose legitimacy Yang Wo and several other regional warlords refused to acknowledge — was assassinated by the officers Zhang Hao and Xu Wen. In the aftermaths of Yang Wo's death, Zhang postured taking command formally himself, but was urged not to by the official Yan Keqiu, who subsequently wrote and issued an order in the name of Yang Wo's and Yang Longyan's mother Lady Dowager Shi naming Yang Longyan acting military governor of Hongnong. Shortly after, Xu assassinated Zhang and took over the regency by himself, reassuring an alarmed Lady Dowager Shi (who requested to yield the seat of power to Xu himself and have the Yang household return to their ancestral home of Lu Prefecture (廬州, in modern Hefei, Anhui)) that he had no intent to seize power. In effect, though, the command of the domain was in Xu's hands. Thereafter, the Wu officials met with Li Yan, the official representative that Emperor Zhaozong had sent to Huainan, and Li, in the name of the Tang emperor, made Yang Longyan the full military governor of Huainan, the supreme commander of the southeastern circuits, the Prince of Hongnong, and honorary chancellor (同中書門下平章事, Tong Zhongshu Menxia Pingzhangshi).

== As Prince of Hongnong ==
After he took the throne, Yang Longyan sent the officer Wan Quangan (萬全感) to covertly go through hostile (i.e., Later Liang) territory to notify nominal allies Jin and Qi (both of which had also refused to recognize Later Liang) of his ascension.

In 909, Wei Quanfeng, who controlled the Fu Prefecture (撫州, in modern Fuzhou, Jiangxi) region, rose to challenge Hongnong's control of Zhennan Circuit (鎮南, headquartered in modern Nanchang, Jiangxi). After the Hongnong general Zhou Ben defeated, captured, and delivered Wei to the Hongnong capital Guangling (廣陵), Yang Longyan released Wei on the account of his having aided Yang Xingmi on one of his campaigns and also gave Wei many gifts.

In spring 910, Wan returned from his mission to Jin and Qi. He also announced that Li Maozhen the Prince of Qi had, under the authority of the Tang emperor, bestowed the greater honorary chancellor title of Zhongshu Ling (中書令) and authorized him to inherit Yang Xingmi's title of Prince of Wu. Yang Longyan accepted the titles and issued a general pardon.

== As Prince of Wu ==
Xu Wen continued to maintain control of the Wu governance. This led to resentment by a number of Wu's senior generals — Liu Wei (劉威) the military governor of Zhennan Circuit, Tao Ya (陶雅) the governor (觀察使, Guanchashi) of She Prefecture (歙州, in modern Huangshan, Anhui), Li Yu (李遇) the governor of Xuan Prefecture (宣州, in modern Xuancheng, Anhui), and Li Jian (李簡) the prefect of Chang Prefecture (常州, in modern Changzhou, Jiangsu) — each of whom had greater accomplishments and had higher standing in the army than Xu did when Yang Xingmi was alive. Li Yu was particularly unhappy, often stating, "Who is this Xu Wen? I do not even remember his face, and now he is ruling the state!" On an occasion when the officer Xu Jie was on a diplomatic mission to Wu's southeastern neighbor Wuyue, Xu Wen had Xu Jie stop by in Xuan Prefecture to try to persuade Li Yu to show submission by going to Guangling to pay homage to Yang Longyan. Li Yu initially agreed, but Xu Jie inadvertently stated, "If you, Lord, do not do so, people will say that you are committing treason." Li Yu angrily responded, "You, sir, are saying that I, Li Yu, am treasonous. Is it not more treasonous to murder the Shizhong [(i.e., Yang Wo)]?" When Xu Wen heard this, he became angry and sent the general Chai Zaiyong (柴再用), with Xu Wen's adoptive son Xu Zhigao serving as Chai's deputy, to attack Li Yu at Xuan. Li Yu's initially was able to hold against Chai's attacks, but Xu Wen put Li Yu's youngest son, who was serving as an officer at Huainan headquarters, under arrest, and had him displayed at the army. Xu Wen then sent the official He Rao (何蕘) to, in Yang Longyan's name, state to Li Yu: "If you, Lord, are planning on rebelling, please execute He Rao to show yourself. Otherwise, follow him out of the city." Li Yu thus surrendered. Xu Wen had Chai kill Li Yu and slaughter his household, and it was said that after this event, all the generals were fearful of Xu and did not dare to resist him further.

Meanwhile, Liu also came under suspicion, and Xu Wen considered attacking him. Liu, knowing this, followed the advice of his guest Huang Na (黃訥) and went to Guangling to pay homage to Yang Longyan. Tao, hearing of Li Yu's death, also became fearful and therefore arrived with Liu. Xu Wen showed the both of them great respect, acting as if they were Yang Xingmi, and also granted them additional honors. Thereafter, Xu Wen, Liu, and Tao went to meet with Li Yan and requested Li Yan to, in Emperor Zhaozong's name, formally bestow Yang Longyan the titles of Taishi (太師) and Prince of Wu (apparently regarding Li Maozhen's bestowment to be insufficiently formal).

Xu Wen also treated Yang Longyan with respect. However, things changed in 915, when Xu Wen, who was then carrying the titles of military governor of Zhenhai Circuit (鎮海, headquartered at Run Prefecture (潤州) in modern Zhenjiang, Jiangsu) and Duke of Qi, left Guangling and established his headquarters at Run Prefecture. He left his oldest biological son Xu Zhixun in command at Guangling as junior regent, with Xu Wen himself only ruling on the most important matters. As junior regent, Xu Zhixun grew arrogant, alienating the Wu officials and officers. He was even disrespectful to Yang Longyan, who was formally his sovereign. For example, once he put on a canjunxi play with himself playing the joker (canjun) and with Yang Longyan playing the canghu, or the butt of jokes, following him around abjectly. He also once fired slingshots at Yang Longyan when they both went on a river cruise. On yet another occasion, when they were both watching flowers at Chanzhi Temple (禪智寺), Xu Zhixun was drunk and became very insulting toward Yang Longyan, such that the prince became fearful and began to cry. The prince's attendants quickly put him on a boat and left the scene. Xu Zhixun tried to give chase, and when he could not catch up to Yang Longyan, he killed some of Yang Longyan's attendants. Once, when Xu Zhixun heard that the general Li Decheng had many singing girls in his household, he sent a demand to Li that the singing girls be given to him. When Li responded that these singing girls were too old for Xu and that he would try to find younger and more beautiful ones for Xu, Xu responded to Li's messenger, "One day I will kill Li Decheng and take even his wife!" These unlawful deeds, however, were said to be unreported to Xu Wen as the staff members were fearful of the consequences of reporting.

In 916, the Wu officers Ma Qian (馬謙) and Li Qiu (李球) tried to start a coup against Xu Zhixun. They seized Yang Longyan and ascended a tower, ordering the soldiers to attack Xu Zhixun. Xu Zhixun was about to flee, when the official Yan Keqiu advised him not to, arguing that for him to flee would cause a massive panic. Soon, relief forces launched by Xu Wen from Run Prefecture, commanded by the general Zhu Jin, arrived. When Zhu called out to the mutineer soldiers to surrender, they panicked and fled. Ma and Li were captured and executed.

In or around 917, there was an occasion when Yang Longyan sent an emissary to Emperor Taizu of Liao, the emperor of a newly established Khitan Empire. Yang's emissary delivered, as a gift, a kind of oil that, according to historical accounts, would make a fire that was set using it to be immune to being put out by water. The Khitan emperor was pleased with the gift and immediately considering attacking Jin's You Prefecture (幽州, in modern Beijing), using the oil, but was dissuaded by his wife Empress Shulü Ping.

In 917, Later Liang's erstwhile vassal Liu Yan the military governor of Qinghai Circuit (清海, headquartered in modern Guangzhou, Guangdong) declared himself the emperor of a new state of Yue (soon to be renamed to Han and therefore known as Southern Han in traditional histories). He sent emissaries to Yang to announce his doing so and also to urge Yang to also claim imperial title. Yang did not react to this suggestion.

By 918, Xu Zhixun had also alienated Zhu Jin. On one occasion, Xu tried to rape one of Zhu's servant girls. Further, Zhu, as a senior general, was at that point carrying the high title of deputy supreme commander of the southeastern circuits (with Yang himself carrying the title of supreme commander) and therefore formally carried a higher position than Xu. Xu was displeased with this and therefore decided to send Zhu out of the capital. He therefore established a Jinghuai Circuit (靜淮) at Si Prefecture (泗州, in modern Huai'an) and made Zhu the military governor. Zhu became hateful of Xu Zhixun as well, but outwardly pretended to continue to honor Xu Zhixun.

As Zhu was (outwardly) preparing to leave Jiangdu, Xu Zhixun went to bid him farewell. Zhu held a feast for him, offered him wine, had Zhu's favorite concubine come outside to greet him and sing for him, and presented Zhu's favorite horse as a gift to him. Zhu then invited him into the middle of Zhu's mansion, where Zhu's wife Lady Tao came out to greet him as well as a sign of respect. Xu Zhixun was pleased and took no further precautions, while Zhu already had his elite guards surround the hall. As Lady Tao bowed to Xu Zhixun and he bowed back, Zhu struck him and, as he fell to the ground, Zhu's elite soldiers entered and cut off his head. After Zhu took the head and showed them to Xu Zhixun's soldiers, they all fled. Zhu then entered the palace and showed the head to Yang, stating, "I, your servant, have removed a harm to Your Majesty." However, Yang, in fear of the consequences, fled and stated, "You, Uncle, take care of yourself! I know nothing about this." (Yang referred to Zhu as uncle because Yang Xingmi's first wife Lady Zhu had the same surname, although she was unrelated to Zhu Jin.) Shortly after, Zhu was cornered by soldiers under Xu Wen's associate Zhai Qian (翟虔), and committed suicide.

In the aftermaths of Xu Zhixun's death, Xu Wen was initially suspicious that many generals and officials were involved in Zhu's plot. He put Li Yan and the general Mi Zhicheng (米志誠) to death and considered carrying out many more executions. However, Xu Zhigao and Yan Keqiu convinced Xu Wen that Xu Zhixun brought disaster on himself with his improper behavior, and Xu Wen's anger was abated. Because all of his other biological sons were young, Xu Wen left Xu Zhigao in charge at Guangling as junior regent, succeeding Xu Zhixun, while he himself returned to his headquarters (which had been moved to Sheng Prefecture (昇州, in modern Nanjing, Jiangsu) by this point). It was said that Xu Zhigao was respectful to Yang and comforted the people and the officials.

Meanwhile, Xu Wen urged Yang to take imperial title. Yang refused, but in 919 took on the greater title of King of Wu. He changed the carry-over Tang era name of Tianyou to a new era name of Wuyi, in effect ending the vassal relationship to the defunct Tang dynasty. He also established an imperial administration, honored his mother Lady Dowager Shi as queen dowager, and created his brothers and his son Yang Jiming (楊繼明, who would later be renamed Yang Fen (楊玢)) dukes.

== As King of Wu ==
Also in 919, Xu Wen had a major victory against invading Wuyue troops at Wuxi. Xu then sent the Wuyue captives back to Wuyue and agreed to peace with Wuyue, and it was said that Wu would not be engaged in war with Wuyue for some 20 years thereafter. Both Yang Longyan and Xu frequently wrote Wuyue's prince Qian Liu, who was then a vassal to Later Liang, to urge him to declare independence from Later Liang, but Qian refused.

It was said that over the years, Yang displayed a serious, magnanimous, and respectful personality. He displayed no displeasure at Xu and Xu's sons' having the actual reins of the state, and Xu did not suspect him of intent to seize power personally. However, it was said that after the declaration of the independent Wu state, which he himself did not want to see, he became depressed. He drank often and ate little, and thus became ill. As of summer 920, he was near death. Xu Wen arrived from Run Prefecture to oversee the transition. Some of Xu's followers urged that he take over the throne himself, but Xu himself disavowed such an intent, stating, "If I had the intent to do so, I would have done so when I killed Zhang Hao and would not have waited until today. Even if the Yangs were out of males, I would have supported a female to take the throne. Anyone who says anything else will be decapitated!" However, while Yang Longyan's oldest younger brother was Yang Meng the Duke of Lujiang, Xu had often been suspicious at Yang Meng's intent if he took the throne since Yang Meng was known to have complained about the Xus' hold on power, and therefore decided to skip Yang Meng. Instead, he issued an order in Yang Longyan's name summoning his next younger brother, Yang Pu the Duke of Danyang, to Guangling to formally serve as regent, while moving Yang Meng, who had been made the military prefect of Chu Prefecture (楚州, in modern Huai'an, Jiangsu), to be the military prefect of Shu Prefecture (舒州, in modern Anqing, Anhui). Yang Longyan died shortly after, and Yang Pu took the throne.

== Personal information ==
- Fathers
  - Yang Xingmi
- Mother
  - Lady Shi
- Child
  - Yang Fen (楊玢), né Yang Jiming (楊繼明), initially the Duke of Luling, later the Prince of Nanyang (created 928), later the Duke of Nanyang during Southern Tang

== Notes and references ==
- History of the Five Dynasties, vol. 134.
- New History of the Five Dynasties, vol. 61.
- Spring and Autumn Annals of the Ten Kingdoms (十國春秋), vol. 2.
- Zizhi Tongjian, vols. 266, 267, 268, 269, 270, 271.

Chinese nobility
Preceded by Yang Wo (Prince Wei of Hongnong)	Prince/King of Wu (Hongnong); 908–920	Succeeded by Yang Pu (Emperor Rui)
