= Xu Zhixun (younger) =

Xu Zhixun (徐知詢) (died 934), formally Prince Kang of Donghai (東海康王), was the second biological son of Xu Wen, the regent of the Chinese Five Dynasties and Ten Kingdoms period state Wu. He had tried to, during Xu Wen's lifetime, displace his older adoptive brother Xu Zhigao as the junior regent, but was unable to do so. After Xu Wen's death, he tried to contend for control of the Wu state with Xu Zhigao, as he inherited the command of the large army under Xu Wen's command, but was later detained and stripped of the command by Xu Zhigao. He later continued to serve as a general of the Wu state but without sufficient power to again challenge Xu Zhigao.

== Background ==
It is not known when Xu Zhixun was born, or who his mother was. He was the second oldest known biological son of Xu Wen's, but his older brother Xu Zhixun (elder) was at one point referred to as Sanlang (三郎, "third-born son") by Song Qiqiu, implying that he might have had two other older brothers who died in infancy and therefore were not counted in traditional counting of birth order. He had four younger biological brothers, Xu Zhihui (徐知誨), Xu Zhijian (徐知諫), Xu Zhizheng (徐知證), and Xu Zhi'e (徐知諤). Xu Wen's adoptive son Xu Zhigao was older than he was. It was said that neither he nor the elder Xu Zhixun had any real regard for Xu Zhigao as a brother.

== During Xu Wen's regency ==
The first historical reference to Xu Zhixun was in 918, when the elder Xu Zhixun, then serving as the junior regent at Wu's capital Guangling (廣陵, in modern Yangzhou, Jiangsu) with Xu Wen stationed at Sheng Prefecture (昇州, in modern Nanjing, Jiangsu), was assassinated by the general Zhu Jin, who then committed suicide. All of Xu Wen's sons, except Xu Zhigao, who was then 30, were then said to be young, so Xu Wen made Xu Zhigao the junior regent, replacing the elder Xu Zhixun. Subsequently, Xu's entrusted official Yan Keqiu suggested replacing Xu Zhigao with Xu Zhixun, but Xu Wen did not do so.

Over the years, Yan and other officials, including Chen Yanqian (陳彥謙) and Xu Jie, had also advocated for Xu Wen to replace Xu Zhigao with a biological son, although the historical records did not indicate that they recommended Xu Zhixun specifically. Xu Zhixun himself had also lobbied Xu Wen, but Xu Wen responded, "None of you has much talent as your older brother." However, by 927, by which time Xu Zhixun carried the titles of commander of armed forces (行軍司馬, Xingjun Sima), military governor (Jiedushi) of Zhongyi Circuit (忠義, headquartered in modern Xiangyang, Hubei, but which was then under control of Later Tang), and honorary chancellor (同中書門下平章事, Tong Zhongshu Menxia Pingzhangshi), Xu Wen changed his mind. He was planning to head to Guangling to recommend to then-King of Wu, Yang Pu, that Yang Pu claim imperial title, and then assign his two sons to new posts, with Xu Zhixun replacing Xu Zhigao as junior regent. However, as he was set to depart Sheng Prefecture, he became ill, and he instead wrote his petition and sent Xu Zhixun toward Guangling, intending to have Xu Zhixun replace Xu Zhigao after the petition were delivered. Xu Zhigao, hearing this, decided to resign and request to be the military governor of Zhennan Circuit (鎮南, headquartered in modern Nanchang, Jiangxi). However, when Xu Zhixun was still on the way, Xu Wen died, and Xu Zhixun, hearing of Xu Wen's death, immediately returned to Sheng Prefecture to attend to the aftermaths, allowing Xu Zhigao to, for the time being, remain as regent.

== After Xu Wen's death ==
Shortly after Xu Wen's death, Yang Pu, per Xu Wen's final recommendations, took imperial title. Meanwhile, Xu Wen's titles were split between Xu Zhigao and Xu Zhixun, with Xu Zhigao assuming Xu Wen's title as overseer of all military matters (都督中外總軍事, Dudu Zhongwai Zongjunshi), while Xu Zhixun took on the title of deputy supreme commander of all circuits (諸道副都統, Zhudao Fu Dutong, with Xu Wen having been supreme commander before, and that post now left open) and military governor of Ningguo (寧國, headquartered in modern Xuancheng, Anhui) and Zhenhai (鎮海, headquartered in modern Zhenjiang, Jiangsu) Circuits, which Xu Wen had been; he also took the greater honorary chancellor title of Shizhong (侍中).

Even though Xu Zhigao remained in control of Wu's imperial government, Xu Zhixun, at Jinling (i.e., Sheng Prefecture), controlled the largest army of the state, and he, wielding that authority, contended for decision-making with Xu Zhigao, who tried to curb Xu Zhixun's military power. For example, in 929, when Xu Zhixun's father-in-law, the general Li Jian (李簡) the military governor of Wuchang Circuit (武昌, headquartered in modern Wuhan, Hubei) died, Xu Zhixun took 2,000 of Li Jian's soldiers and kept them under his command, while recommending Li Jian's son Li Yanzhong (李彥忠) to succeed Li Jian. Xu Zhigao, however, ignoring Xu Zhixun's recommendations, made the general Chai Zaiyong (柴再用) the military governor of Wuchang, drawing Xu Zhixun's ire.

Given Xu Zhixun's military strength, Xu Zhigao feared him, but Xu Zhixun's arrogance alienated his younger brothers, particularly both Xu Zhihui and Xu Zhijian; Xu Zhihui secretly reported Xu Zhixun's actions to Xu Zhigao, while Xu Zhijian, at Guangling, participated in Xu Zhigao's machinations against Xu Zhixun. Xu Jie, who had previously supported Xu Zhixun, also realized that Xu Zhixun lacked the proper abilities to lead, and instead turned his allegiance to Xu Zhigao. Meanwhile, Xu Zhixun was not curbing his actions properly; for example, when Qian Liu, the king of Wu's neighbor Wuyue, sent Xu Zhixun gifts of vessels and saddles adorn with dragons and phoenixes — which only the sovereign could use — Xu Zhixun used them, making no attempts to avoid making them into a display. His close associate Zhou Tingwang (周廷望) persuaded him to let Zhou take large amounts of wealth to Guangling to try to use them to bribe other high level officials to turn from Xu Zhigao and toward him, but when Zhou arrived at Guangling, Zhou secretly pledged allegiance to Xu Zhigao through Xu Zhigao's associate Zhou Zong, and informed Xu Zhixun's actions to Xu Zhigao — but then, when he returned to Jinling, also informed Xu Zhigao's actions to Xu Zhixun, trying to play both sides.

Later in 929, Xu Zhixun tried to summon Xu Zhigao to Jinling to attend a ceremony where they would remove mourning clothes that they had put on for Xu Wen's death; Xu Zhigao refused, claiming that Yang Pu would not let him leave the capital. Meanwhile, Zhou Zong told Zhou Tingwang to inform Xu Zhixun that he had been accused of seven major crimes and should go to the capital to defend himself. Xu Zhixun believed Zhou Tingwang, and therefore went to Guangling. Once he arrived there, Xu Zhigao detained him and did not allow him to return to Jinling, sending the officer Ke Hou (柯厚) to lead the Jinling forces back to Guangling, thus consolidating the command under Xu Zhigao himself. Xu Zhixun was kept at Guangling to take the office of army commander (統軍, Tongjun), still carrying the title of military governor of Zhenhai Circuit. (The command of Ningguo Circuit went to Xu Zhigao.) The brothers then had a verbal confrontation in which Xu Zhixun stated, "When the deceased Prince [(i.e., Xu Wen, who carried the title of Prince of Donghai)] left this world, you, older brother, were his son. How could it be that you did not attend to his funereal matters?" Xu Zhigao responded, "You had a sword drawn, intended for me. How could I dare to go? You are a subject, so how could you have ridden on imperial wagons and worn imperial clothes?" When Xu Zhixun then questioned him about his actions, Xu Zhigao realized that Zhou Tingwang was playing both sides, so had Zhou Tingwang executed.

Later in 929, there was an incident in which, traditionally, it was believed that Xu Zhigao tried to poison Xu Zhixun. Xu Zhigao had held a feast for Xu Zhixun and offered him wine in a gold goblet, stating, "May my younger brother live a thousand years." Xu Zhixun, suspecting that the wine was poisoned, poured half of the wine into another gold goblet and offered it to Xu Zhigao, stating, "I wish to live five hundred years a piece with you, older brother." Xu Zhigao's expression changed and initially would not drink, while Xu Zhixun would not withdraw his offer, and their attendants did not know what to do. However, a performer named Shen Jiangao (申漸高) walked by them and, after stating some humorous words, grabbed the two goblets and drank the wine inside himself, and then left with the goblets. When Xu Zhigao secretly sent an antidote to Shen's house, it was too late; Shen had already died. After this, however, Xu Zhigao appeared to have made no further attempts on Xu Zhixun's life. At some point, it appeared that Xu Zhigao allowed him to report to Zhenhai's capital Run Prefecture (潤州), but he did not spend much effort in governing the circuit.

In 931, Xu Zhijian, who was then serving as the military governor of Zhennan, died. Yang Pu commissioned Xu Zhixun to replace him, and also created him the Prince of Donghai. On the way to Zhennan, he met Xu Zhijian's funereal train, and he was said to have touched Xu Zhijian's casket and wept, stating, "You, younger brother, intended this, and I have no regrets. But how can you face the deceased Prince in the underworld?" He died in 934, while still serving at Zhennan.

== Notes and references ==
- Zizhi Tongjian, vols. 270, 276, 277, 279.
- Spring and Autumn Annals of the Ten Kingdoms (十國春秋), vol. 13.
