= Xu Jie (politician, born 1955) =

Chinese politician

Xu Jie (simplified Chinese: 许杰; traditional Chinese: 許傑; born March 1955) is a former Chinese politician. He was formerly the deputy director of the State Bureau for Letters and Calls (国家信访局; SBLC). He joined the workforce in April 1974. Between 1978 and 1982 he studied at Renmin University and graduated with a degree in economics. Since 1989 he has worked in the state petitioning system as an officer. He worked briefly as a deputy county governor in Changyi County, Shandong province between 1992 and 1993. He began working as the General Office chief of the SBLC in 2000. He then joined the organization's party group and became deputy director in 2005.

On November 28, 2013, Xu was abruptly dismissed from his position as deputy director. He then underwent investigation by the party's internal disciplinary organ. On June 27, 2014, the party investigation concluded that Xu abused his power for the gain of associated organizations and individuals, solicited and accepted "massive bribes", and "committed adultery". He was expelled from the Chinese Communist Party. In December 2015, he was sentenced to 13 years in prison, for taking bribes of over 6.1 million yuan (~$950,000), and using the convenience of his office to doctor documents related to petitions.
