= Zhang Hao (general) =

Zhang Hao (Chinese: 張顥; pinyin: Zhāng Hào) (died June 18, 908) was a guard commander for late Chinese Tang dynasty warlord Yang Xingmi the Prince of Wu, who was the military governor (jiedushi) of Huainan Circuit (淮南, headquartered in modern Yangzhou, Jiangsu), and Yang Xingmi's son Yang Wo (Prince Wei of Hongnong) early in the Five Dynasties and Ten Kingdoms period. Along with fellow guard commander Xu Wen, he took over reins of the Hongnong state (which, in later times, would be known as Wu) by effectively putting Yang Wo under physical control. In 908, fearing that Yang Wo was about to seize power back and kill them, they assassinated him first. However, they then turned on each other, and Zhang was killed by Xu, who then took sole rein of Hongnong.

== Background ==
It is not known when Zhang Hao was born, but it is known that he was from Cai Prefecture (蔡州, in modern Zhumadian, Henan). At one point, he served as a soldier under Qin Zongquan, who was at one point a Tang dynasty-commissioned military governor (jiedushi) of Fengguo Circuit (奉國, headquartered at Cai Prefecture) but who later declared himself to be emperor of a new state. Zhang, while serving under Qin, was known for his ferocity in battle, and he was later assigned to serve under Qin's general Sun Ru, when Qin sent his brother Qin Zongheng (秦宗衡) and Sun to try to capture Huainan Circuit (淮南, headquartered in modern Yangzhou, Jiangsu) in 887, which was then in a state of confusion after battles between Qin Yan and Bi Shiduo, on one side and Yang Xingmi and Lü Yongzhi on the other for control of the circuit. (Sun soon killed Qin Zongheng and took over his army). During a battle where Yang's army prevailed over Sun's, Zhang surrendered to Yang.

== Service under Yang Xingmi ==
Yang Xingmi treated Zhang Hao well, and at one point he assigned him to be part of his army protecting Yang's ancestral home Lu Prefecture (廬州, in modern Hefei, Anhui). In 889, however, when Yang was away attacking Xuan Prefecture (宣州, in modern Xuancheng, Anhui), Sun attacked Lu Prefecture, and Cai Chou (蔡儔) the prefect of Lu Prefecture, whom Yang had left in charge of Lu Prefecture, surrendered. Sun allowed Cai to retain Lu Prefecture, and Zhang continued to serve under Cai. After Yang finally defeated and killed Sun in 892, Cai did not resubmit to Yang. Rather, he allied with Ni Zhang (倪章) the prefect of Shu Prefecture (舒州, in modern Anqing, Anhui) to jointly resist Yang. Yang sent his general Li Shenfu to put Lu Prefecture under siege and later joined the siege himself in early 893. During the siege, Zhang climbed over the city walls and surrendered to Yang again. Yang initially assigned him to serve under Yuan Zhen (袁稹) the commander of Yinqiang Corps (銀槍都). Yuan, believing Zhang has shown himself to be unreliable, asked Yang for permission to executed Zhang. Yang did not want to see that happen, and believing that Yuan would not tolerate Zhang, instead assigned Zhang to his own guard corps.

Zhang Hao's activities over the next 12 years were not recorded in history, but by 905, by which time Yang Xingmi had come to control the territory between Huai River and Lake Tai and carried the Tang-bestowed title of Prince of Wu, Zhang was serving as the commander of the right guard corps (with another officer of Yang's, Xu Wen, serving as the commander of the left guard corps). In 905, when Yang grew extremely ill, Yang's oldest son Yang Wo, who was not well-respected by his officers, was serving as the governor (觀察使, Guanchashi) of Xuan Prefecture. Yang Xingmi instructed his secretary Zhou Yin (周隱) to summon Yang Wo, preparing to transfer authorities to him; Zhou opposed this, arguing that Yang Wo was frivolous and an alcoholic, instead suggesting that Yang Xingmi entrust his domain to Liu Wei (劉威), who was then serving as the prefect of Lu Prefecture, instead. Yang Xingmi was shocked by this proposal, and when Xu and Zhang heard of it, they opposed as well on the grounds that Yang Xingmi built his domain and should transfer it to a son; Yang Xingmi agreed. Subsequently, when Xu and Yan Keqiu realized that Zhou had not sent the order to summon Yang Wo, they took the order and sent it; Yang Wo then returned to Huainan's capital Yang Prefecture (揚州). Yang Xingmi transferred his authorities to Yang Wo, and then died. Yang Wo succeeded him and used the lesser title (bestowed by Emperor Zhaozong's emissary Li Yan) the Prince of Hongnong.

== Service under Yang Wo ==
After Yang Wo annexed Zhennan Circuit (鎮南, headquartered in modern Nanchang, Jiangxi) in 906, he became increasingly arrogant and intolerant. He executed Zhou Yin, which caused fear to permeate among his staff members. Despite being still in the mourning period for Yang Xingmi, he spent his time, day and night, in feast and games. When Zhang Hao and Xu Wen tried to tearfully dissuade him from such behavior, he angrily stated to them, "If you believe that I am not capable enough, why do you not kill me and take over yourselves?" This caused them to be fearful as well. They thus planned to act against Yang Wo. They first sent three officers who commanded Yang Wo's personal army (which he brought back from Xuan Prefecture), Zhu Siqing (朱思勍), Fan Sicong (范思從), and Chen Fan (陳璠) to join under the general Qin Pei (秦裴) in Qin's operations to pacify Zhennan, and then sent an officer, Chen You (陳祐) to execute them at Qin's camp under false charges of treason. When Yang Wo heard of this, he prepared to kill Zhang and Xu, but before he could act, they acted first. In spring 907, they took 200 guards under their command into the mansion, claiming to be carrying out bingjian (兵諫, i.e., "correction by force"). They executed a group of Yang Wo's close associates and then, while not physically acting against Yang Wo himself, effectively took control of the headquarters. If other officers disagreed with them, they found reasons to execute those officers.

== Assassination of Yang Wo and death ==
Later in 907, the powerful warlord Zhu Quanzhong the military governor of Xuanwu Circuit (宣武, headquartered in modern Kaifeng, Henan) forced Emperor Zhaozong's son and successor Emperor Ai to yield the throne to him, ending Tang and starting a new Later Liang with Zhu as its Emperor Taizu. Yang Wo, along with Li Keyong the Prince of Jin, Li Maozhen the Prince of Qi, and Wang Jian the Prince of Shu, did not recognize the new Later Liang emperor as emperor, and continued to use the Tang era name of Tianyou. Without a Tang emperor, however, he was in effect the ruler of a new state of Hongnong.

However, Zhang Hao and Xu Wen remained in effective control of the headquarters, and Yang Wo was hoping to, but unable to, eliminate them. They considered their own positions precarious, however, and they resolved to kill Yang Wo, divide the domain between themselves, and then submit to Later Liang. On June 9, 908, Zhang sent his subordinate Ji Xiang (紀祥) into Yang Wo's mansion with soldiers under Zhang's command and killed him in his bedroom. (The reason why only Zhang's soldiers were used was that Xu pointed out that if they mixed soldiers, the soldiers may not cooperate with each other, and Zhang did not want to let Xu's soldiers conduct the assassination.) Zhang and Xu subsequently declared that Yang Wo had died of a sudden illness. When Zhang postured at taking over command of the domain, however, Yan Keqiu spoke up against it and subsequently produced a document, which he claimed to be from Yang Wo's mother Lady Dowager Shi, pleading for allegiance of the officers behind her younger son Yang Longyan. Zhang, rebuffed in his attempt to directly take over, acquiesced and allowed Yang Longyan to take the throne as the new Prince of Hongnong.

Subsequently, Zhang tried to send Xu out of the headquarters to be the governor of Zhexi Circuit (浙西, headquartered in modern Zhenjiang, Jiangsu), but Yan persuaded Xu and Li Chengsi (李承嗣) the deputy military governor of Huainan that Zhang was intending to eliminate them and starting by sending Xu out of the capital; Xu thereafter found excuses to stay at Yang Prefecture. After Zhang then failed in an assassination attempt against Yan, Yan and Xu plotted to overthrow him. Xu subsequently got the officer Zhong Taizhang (鍾泰章) to join the plot. On the night of June 18, Zhong took his soldiers and entered headquarters, killing Zhang and his close associates. Xu then blamed the assassination of Yang Wo on Zhang alone, and effectively took over as Yang Longyan's regent.

== Notes and references ==
- Zizhi Tongjian, vols. 259, 265, 266.
- Spring and Autumn Annals of the Ten Kingdoms (十國春秋), vol. 13.
