= Yang Wo =

Prince of Hongnong from 905 to 908

Emperor Liezu of Yang Wu 楊吳烈祖
- Commandery Prince of Hongnong

Commandery Prince of Hongnong (弘農郡王)
- Reign: 905 or May 12, 907 – June 9, 908
- Predecessor: Yang Xingmi as Prince of Wu
- Successor: Yang Longyan
- Born: 886
- Died: June 9, 908 (aged 21–22)
- Burial: Shao Mausoleum (紹陵, presumptively in modern Yizheng, Jiangsu)
Full name
- Family name: Yáng (楊); Given name: Wò (渥)
Era dates
- Tiānyòu (天祐): 905–908
Posthumous name
- Initially Prince Wēi (威王, lit. "fierce"), later Prince Jǐng (景王, lit. "decisive"), finally Emperor Jǐng (景皇帝) (honored by Yang Pu)
Temple name
- Lìezǔ (烈祖) (honored by Yang Pu)
- House: Yang
- Dynasty: Yang Wu

Yang Wo (Chinese: 楊渥) (886 – June 9, 908), courtesy name Chengtian, also known by his temple name as the Emperor Liezu of Yang Wu (楊吳烈祖), was the first independent ruler of the Chinese Yang Wu dynasty during the Five Dynasties and Ten Kingdoms period, reigning as the Commandery Prince of Hongnong.

== Background ==
Yang Wo was born in 886, during the reign of Emperor Xizong of Tang. He was the oldest son of Yang Xingmi, who was then the prefect of Lu Prefecture (廬州, in modern Hefei, Anhui). His mother was Yang Xingmi's concubine Lady Shi, who was also the mother to his younger brother Yang Longyan. He had four other younger brothers, Yang Meng, Yang Pu, Yang Xun (楊潯), and Yang Che (楊澈).

== During Yang Xingmi's rule of Huainan ==
The first historical reference to Yang Wo's acts was in 904, by which time Yang Xingmi had become a major warlord in control of Huainan Circuit (淮南, headquartered in modern Yangzhou, Jiangsu) as well as several other nearby circuits and carried the title of Prince of Wu, and Yang Wo was serving as the commander of all headquarter guards, but was said to not have a good reputation among Yang Xingmi's staff. In 904, when Tai Meng (臺濛) the governor (觀察使, Guanchashi) of Xuan Prefecture (宣州, in modern Xuancheng, Anhui), died, Yang Xingmi sent Yang Wo to Xuan to replace Tai. Before he departed Huainan's capital Yang Prefecture (揚州), one of the guard commanders under him, Xu Wen, stated to him:

The Prince is chronically-ill, but his oldest heir is being sent out to another circuit. This must be according to plan of some treacherous subjects. If you receive an order summoning you back, unless it is through a messenger that I send with the Prince's own writing, be careful and do not return.

Yang Wo, believing Xu was advising him out of good faith, wept and thanked him. In 905, when Yang Xingmi became even more ill, he was set on summoning Yang Wo back from Xuan Prefecture and entrusting the affairs of the circuit to him. Yang Xingmi's secretary Zhou Yin (周隱), however, citing Yang Wo's frivolousness, opposed, instead suggesting that Yang Xingmi entrust the circuit to Liu Wei with a promise from Liu to transfer it to another son of Yang Xingmi's. Xu and the other guard commander, Zhang Hao, however, opposed Zhou's proposal, pointing out that Yang had fought these years to leave the state to his family. When Yang Xingmi subsequently issued an order and ordered Zhou to dispatch it to Yang Wo, Zhou did not send it for some time; when Xu and Yan found Yang Xingmi's order still on Zhou's desk, they took it and had it delivered to Yang Wo, who subsequently returned to Yang Prefecture. Yang Xingmi subsequently died, and Yang Wo, with the title of Prince of Hongnong bestowed by Li Yan, an emissary that Emperor Zhaozong of Tang (Emperor Xizong's brother and successor) had previously sent to Yang Xingmi, took over the circuit. Li Yan also bestowed on him the titles of military governor of Huainan, Shizhong (侍中, an honorary chancellor title), and supreme commander of the southeastern circuits.

== As Prince of Hongnong ==
One of Yang Wo's first actions as prince, however, was done out of grudge. When Yang Xingmi summoned him back to Yang Prefecture, Yang Xingmi had sent the general Wang Maozhang to replace him at Xuan Prefecture. Yang Wo wanted to take the tents and screens used by the governor, as well as his guards, with him, but Wang refused to let him leave with those things and soldiers. As soon as Yang Wo became prince, he ordered the general Li Jian (李簡) to attack Wang. Wang did not believe he could resist Li, so he fled to the territory of Qian Liu the military governor of Zhenhai (鎮海, headquartered in modern Hangzhou, Zhejiang) and Zhendong (鎮東, headquartered in modern Shaoxing, Zhejiang) Circuits.

Subsequently, Yang Wo began to carry out campaigns to further enlarge his territory. In 906, he sent Chen Zhixin (陳知新) to attack Wu'an Circuit (武安, headquartered in modern Changsha, Hunan), then under the rule of Ma Yin. Chen captured Wu'an's Yue Prefecture (岳州, in modern Yueyang, Hunan) and expelled the Ma-commissioned prefect Xu Dexun. He then commissioned the general Qin Pei (秦裴) to attack Zhennan Circuit (鎮南, headquartered in modern Nanchang, Jiangxi), whose long-time military governor Zhong Chuan had recently died, and whose succession by his son Zhong Kuangshi was being contested by his adoptive son Zhong Yangui (鍾延規), who submitted to Yang Wo. Qin quickly captured Zhennan's capital Hong Prefecture (洪州) and took Zhong Kuangshi captive. Yang Wo himself assumed the title of military governor of Zhennan, while making Qin the overseer of Hong Prefecture.

These quick military victories caused Yang Wo to be arrogant. Considering Zhou Yin to have committed treason, he executed Zhou, which caused the other staff members to be fearful. Despite being still in the mourning period for Yang Xingmi, he spent his time, day and night, in feast and games. When Xu Wen and Zhang Hao tried to tearfully dissuade him from such behavior, he angrily stated to them, "If you believe that I am not capable enough, why do you not kill me and take over yourselves?" This caused them to be fearful as well. They thus planned to act against Yang Wo. They first sent three officers who commanded Yang Wo's personal army (which he brought back from Xuan Prefecture), Zhu Siqing (朱思勍), Fan Sicong (范思從), and Chen Fan (陳璠) to join under the general Qin Pei (秦裴) in Qin's operations to pacify Zhennan, and then sent an officer, Chen You (陳祐) to execute them at Qin's camp under false charges of treason. When Yang Wo heard of this, he prepared to kill Xu and Zhang, but before he could act, they acted first. In spring 907, they took 200 guards under their command into the mansion, claiming to be carrying out bingjian (兵諫, i.e., "correction by force"). They executed a group of Yang Wo's close associates and then, while not physically acting against Yang Wo himself, effectively took control of the headquarters. If other officers disagreed with them, they found reasons to execute those officers.

Later in 907, the major warlord Zhu Quanzhong the military governor of Xuanwu Circuit (宣武, headquartered in modern Kaifeng, Henan), had Emperor Zhaozong's son and successor Emperor Ai yield the throne to him, ending Tang and starting a new Later Liang as its Emperor Taizu. Yang Wo, along with Li Keyong the Prince of Jin, Li Maozhen the Prince of Qi, and Wang Jian the Prince of Shu, refused to recognize the Later Liang emperor, and continued to use the Tang era name of Tianyou. However, a joint declaration by Yang Wo and Wang Jian calling for the entire realm to rise against Later Liang failed to effectuate a large-scale revolt. Wang Jian subsequently declared himself the Emperor of Shu (with his state known historically as Former Shu), while Yang Wo, Li Keyong, and Li Maozhen, while ruling their realms ostensibly still under Tang authority, effectively became rulers of their own realms.

Later in the year, Yang Wo sent Liu Cun and Chen Zhixin to launch a major attack on Ma (who had submitted to Later Liang and was created the Prince of Chu), with his trusted officer Xu Xuanying (許玄應) as the army monitor. The Hongnong army, however, was crushed by Chu forces, and Liu and Chen were captured (and executed by Ma, after they refused to submit to him). Xu Xuanying fled back, but Zhang and Xu Wen used this as an excuse to have him killed.

Meanwhile, Later Liang's Emperor Taizu decided to attack Hongnong's vassal Lei Yangong the military governor of Wuzhen Circuit (武貞, headquartered in modern Changde, Hunan), ordering Ma and Gao Jichang the military governor of Jingnan Circuit (荊南, headquartered in modern Jingzhou, Hubei) to attack Lei. Lei sought aid from Hongnong. Yang Wo sent the generals Ling Ye (泠業) and Li Rao (李饒) to try to aid Lei, but they were defeated, captured, and executed by Xu Dexun. (After Yang Wo's subsequent death, Lei would be forced to flee to Hongnong territory by himself, with his territory taken by Chu.)

Meanwhile, Yang Wo continued to be unable to control the growing powers of Zhang and Xu Wen, but was trying to find ways to do so. They considered their own positions precarious, and they resolved to kill Yang Wo, divide the domain between themselves, and then submit to Later Liang. On June 9, 908, Zhang sent his subordinate Ji Xiang (紀祥) into Yang Wo's mansion with soldiers under Zhang's command and killed him in his bedroom (The reason why only Zhang's soldiers were used was that Xu pointed out that if they mixed soldiers, the soldiers may not cooperate with each other, and Zhang did not want to let Xu's soldiers conduct the assassination). It was said that when the assassins entered Yang Wo's bedroom, he tried to convince them to turn against Zhang and Xu, offering them prefects' positions. Most assassins were enticed, but Ji was not, and Ji personally strangled Yang Wo. Zhang and Xu subsequently declared that Yang Wo had died of a sudden illness. Xu later killed Zhang and declared Yang Wo's younger brother Yang Longyan the new Prince of Hongnong.

== Personal information ==
- Father
  - Yang Xingmi, Prince Wuzhong of Wu
- Mother
  - Lady Shi, later honored as Lady Dowager and then Queen Dowager
- Son
  - Yang Gong, Duke of Nanchang, Prince of Jian'an 927, demoted to Duke 937

== Notes and references ==
- History of the Five Dynasties, vol. 134.
- New History of the Five Dynasties, vol. 61.
- Spring and Autumn Annals of the Ten Kingdoms (十國春秋), vol. 2.
- Zizhi Tongjian, vols. 265, 266.

Chinese nobility
Preceded by Yang Xingmi (Prince Wuzhong of Wu)	Prince of Hongnong (Wu); 905–908	Succeeded by Yang Longyan (King Xuan of Wu)
Preceded by Yang Xingmi (Prince Wuzhong of Wu)	Ruler of China (Jiangsu/Anhui) (de facto); 905–908	Succeeded by Yang Longyan (King Xuan of Wu)
Preceded by Zhong Kuangshi	Ruler of China (Jiangxi) (de facto); 906–908	Succeeded by Yang Longyan (King Xuan of Wu)
Preceded by Emperor Ai of Tang	Ruler of China (Jiangsu/Anhui/Jiangxi) (de jure); 907–908	Succeeded by Yang Longyan (King Xuan of Wu)
