= Xu Zhixun (elder) =

Xu Zhixun (徐知訓) (895-918) was the oldest biological son of Xu Wen, the regent of the Chinese Five Dynasties and Ten Kingdoms period state Wu. He served as the junior regent from 915 to his death in 918, with his father stationing himself at Jinling away from the capital Guangling (廣陵, in modern Yangzhou, Jiangsu). Xu Zhixun's arrogance alienated the Wu generals, and, in 918, after he angered the general Zhu Jin, Zhu assassinated him.

== Background ==
It is not known when Xu Zhixun was born, or who his mother was. Some scholars infer that he was born on 895. He was the oldest known biological son of Xu Wen's, but was at one point referred to as Sanlang (三郎, "third-born son") by Song Qiqiu, implying that he might have had two older brothers who died in infancy and therefore were not counted in traditional counting of birth order. He had five younger biological brothers, Xu Zhixun (younger), Xu Zhihui (徐知誨), Xu Zhijian (徐知諫), Xu Zhizheng (徐知證), and Xu Zhi'e (徐知諤). It is not known whether Xu Wen's adoptive son Xu Zhigao was older or younger than he was, even though it was clear that Xu Zhigao was older than the younger Xu Zhixun.

It was said that Xu Zhixun tried to learn military strategies when he was young, but was not attentive to his studies. He favored combat games, both armed and unarmed. As, in his youth, Xu Wen had already become the regent of Wu, he, based on his father's status, was carrying out improper actions with impunity.

== As junior regent ==
In 915, apparently in preparation for himself to be stationed outside Guangling, Xu Wen made Xu Zhixun, who was then a guard commander for the headquarters of Wu's prince Yang Longyan, the deputy commander of the Huainan Circuit (淮南, headquartered at Guangling) armed forces. Later in the year, Xu Wen left Guangling to take up a defense post at Run Prefecture (潤州, in modern Zhenjiang, Jiangsu), leaving Xu Zhixun at Guangling to govern affairs of the state, with he himself only ruling on important matters.

In 916, the Wu officers Ma Qian (馬謙) and Li Qiu (李球) tried to start a coup against Xu Zhixun. They seized Yang Longyan and ascended a tower, ordering the soldiers to attack Xu Zhixun. Xu Zhixun was about to flee, when the official Yan Keqiu advised him not to, arguing that for him to flee would cause a massive panic. Soon, relief forces launched by Xu Wen from Run Prefecture, commanded by the general Zhu Jin, arrived. When Zhu called out to the mutineer soldiers to surrender, they panicked and fled. Ma and Li were captured and executed.

Late in 916, Li Cunxu the Prince of Jin, whose Jin state shared a common enemy (Later Liang) with Wu, requested that Jin and Wu attack Later Liang simultaneously. An Wu army was launched, with Xu Zhixun and Zhu in command, and they put Later Liang's Ying Prefecture (潁州, in modern Fuyang, Anhui) under siege. In spring 917, though, with the Later Liang general Yuan Xiangxian arriving with a relief force, the Wu army withdrew.

Over the years as junior regent, Xu Zhixun grew even more arrogant, alienating the Wu officials and officers. He was even disrespectful to Yang Longyan, who was formally his sovereign. For example, once he put on a canjunxi play with himself playing the joker (canjun) and with Yang Longyan playing the canghu, or the butt of jokes following him around abjectly. He also once fired slingshots at Yang Longyan when they both went on a river cruise. On yet another occasion, when they were both watching flowers at Chanzhi Temple (禪智寺), Xu Zhixun was drunk and became very insulting toward Yang Longyan, such that the prince became fearful and began to cry. The prince's attendants quickly put him on a boat and left the scene. Xu Zhixun tried to give chase, and when he could not catch up to Yang Longyan, he killed some of Yang Longyan's attendants. Once, when Xu Zhixun heard that the general Li Decheng had many singing girls in his household, he sent a demand to Li that the singing girls be given to him. When Li responded that these singing girls were too old for Xu and that he would try to find younger and more beautiful ones for Xu, Xu responded to Li's messenger, "One day I will kill Li Decheng and take even his wife!" These unlawful deeds, however, were said to be unreported to Xu Wen as the staff members were fearful of the consequences of reporting.

Xu Zhixun was similarly arrogant toward his adoptive brother Xu Zhigao, not acknowledging him as a true brother. On an occasion when he gathered the brothers for a feast, Xu Zhigao was unable to attend, causing him to make the remark, "The beggar does not want wine. Does he want a sword?" On another occasion when he was feasting with Xu Zhigao, he had his guards prepare to kill Xu Zhigao once Xu Zhigao would get drunk. His younger brother Xu Zhijian, who was friendly with Xu Zhigao, secretly stepped on Xu Zhigao's foot during the feast to warn him, and Xu Zhigao left the feast, pretending to be going to the latrine. When Xu Zhixun realized this, he sent his guard Diao Yanneng (刁彥能) to try to chase after Xu Zhigao, but Diao, after catching up to Xu Zhigao and acknowledging Xu Zhigao, returned, claiming to be unable to catch up to Xu Zhigao. It was said that, among his staff members, only Diao dared to advise him to change his ways, and that the reason why the Wu administration did not fall into complete disarray was because Xu Zhijian was assisting him in policy matters. In 917, when Xu Wen moved his headquarters from Run Prefecture to Sheng Prefecture (昇州, in modern Nanjing, Jiangsu) and wanted to make Xu Zhigao, who had been the prefect of Sheng, the military prefect of Run, Xu Zhigao was initially unhappy about not being given Xuan Prefecture (宣州, in modern Xuancheng, Anhui) instead. Xu Zhigao's strategist Song Qiqiu pointed out to him that Xu Zhixun's arrogance would soon bring disaster, and that Run, being just across the Yangtze River from Guangling, gave him a perfect position to take advantage of this.

== Death ==
By 918, Xu Zhixun, who then carried the titles of commander of all Huainan cavalry and infantry soldiers, military governor (Jiedushi) of Changhua Circuit (the location of which was not recorded in history), and the honorary chancellor designation Tong Zhongshu Menxia Pingzhangshi (同中書門下平章事), had also alienated Zhu Jin, who had previously taught him military strategies. On one occasion, Xu tried to rape one of Zhu's servant girls. Further, Zhu, as a senior general, was at that point carrying the high title of deputy supreme commander of the southeastern circuits (with Yang Longyan himself carrying the title of supreme commander) and therefore formally carried a higher position than Xu. Xu was displeased with this and therefore decided to send Zhu out of the capital. He therefore established a Jinghuai Circuit (靜淮) at Si Prefecture (泗州, in modern Huai'an) and made Zhu the military governor. Zhu became hateful of Xu Zhixun as well, but outwardly pretended to continue to honor Xu Zhixun.

As Zhu was (outwardly) preparing to leave Jiangdu, Xu Zhixun went to bid him farewell. Zhu held a feast for him, offered him wine, had Zhu's favorite concubine come outside to greet him and sing for him, and presented Zhu's favorite horse as a gift to him. Zhu then invited him into the middle of Zhu's mansion, where Zhu's wife Lady Tao came out to greet him as well as a sign of respect. Xu Zhixun was pleased and took no further precautions, while Zhu already had his elite guards surround the hall. As Lady Tao bowed to Xu Zhixun and he bowed back, Zhu struck him and, as he fell to the ground, Zhu's elite soldiers entered and cut off his head. After Zhu took the head and showed them to Xu Zhixun's soldiers, they all fled. However, shortly after, Zhu, who failed in his attempt to solicit Yang Longyan's support for this action, was cornered by soldiers under Xu Wen's associate Zhai Qian (翟虔), and committed suicide.

== Notes and references ==
- Zizhi Tongjian, vols. 269, 270.
- Spring and Autumn Annals of the Ten Kingdoms (十國春秋), vol. 13.
