= Yang Wu =

Historic state in eastern China from 907 to 937

Wu 吳
- 907–937
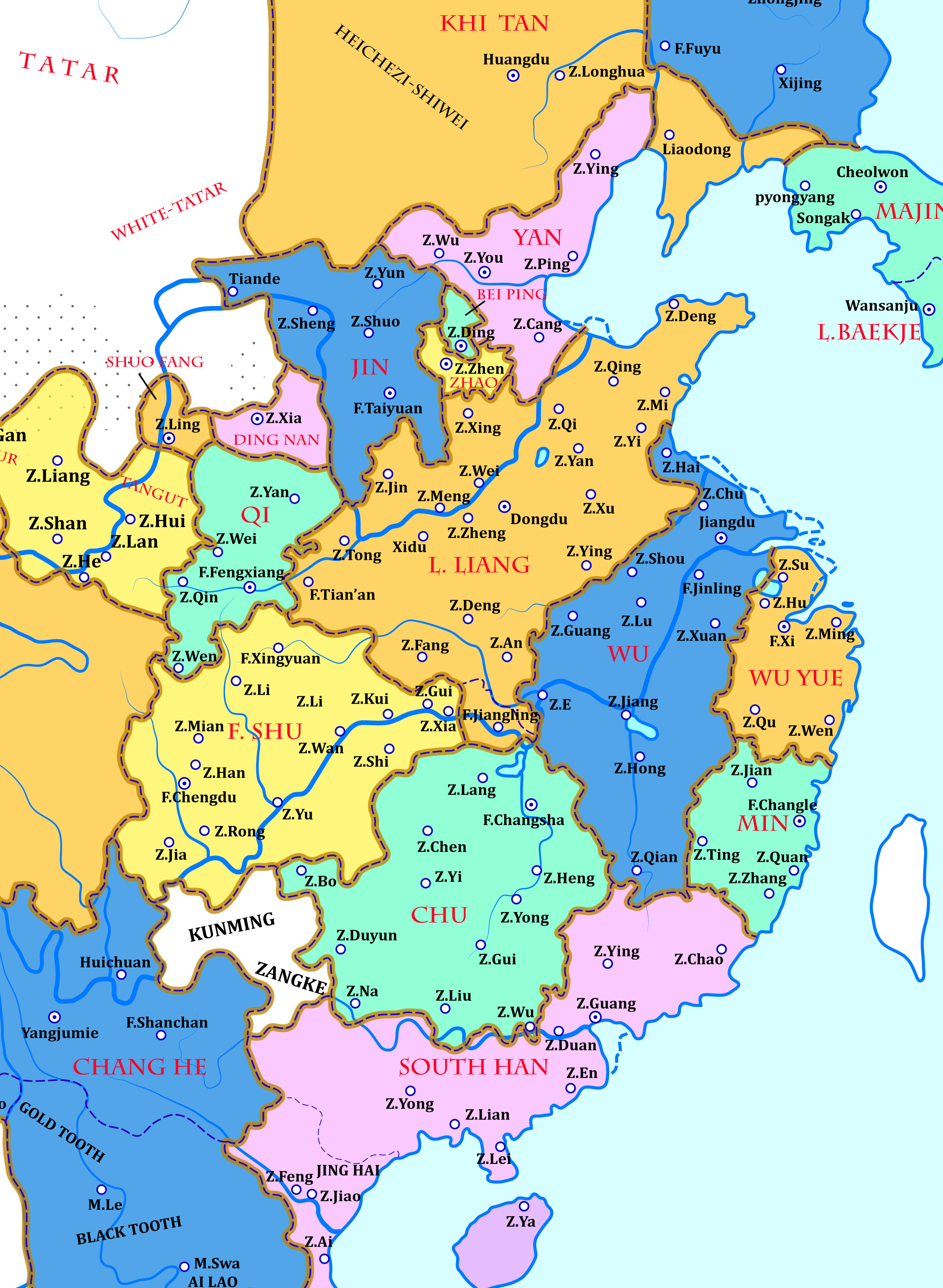
- Capital: Guangling
- Common languages: Middle Chinese
- Government: Monarchy
- Prince/King/Emperor
  - 907–908: Yang Wo
  - 908–921: Yang Longyan
  - 921–937: Yang Pu
- Historical era: Five Dynasties and Ten Kingdoms period
  - Foundation of the State of Wu under Tang rule: 902
  - Fall of the Tang dynasty: June 1 907
  - Yang Longyan proclaimed himself King and inaugurated a new era name: 919
  - Yang Pu acceded the throne as Emperor: November 29, 927
  - Ended by the Southern Tang: 937
- Currency: Chinese coin; Chinese cash
Preceded by	Succeeded by
Tang dynasty	Southern Tang
- Today part of: China

Wu (吳), also referred to as Huainan (淮南), Hongnong (弘農), Southern Wu (南吳), or Yang Wu (楊吳), was a dynastic state of China and one of the Ten Kingdoms during the Five Dynasties and Ten Kingdoms period. It existed from 907 to 937 with capital at Jiangdu Municipality (江都; modern-day Yangzhou, Jiangsu Province).

Some historians consider Wu to have begun in 902, when Yang Xingmi was named Prince of Wu by the Tang dynasty. All three rulers of Wu after 907 (when the Tang dynasty collapsed and Zhu Wen established the Later Liang dynasty) were Yang Xingmi's sons. The first ruler Yang Wo was murdered by his ministers Xu Wen and Zhang Hao, and his two brothers after him were effectively puppets dominated by Xu Wen at first, and later Xu Wen's adopted son Xu Zhigao (Li Bian) who in 937 usurped power to establish the Southern Tang dynasty. Yang Pu, the last ruler, was the only one to claim the title of emperor; the other rulers were kings or princes.

== Founding ==
The founder of Wu, Yang Xingmi, started his career as a volunteer soldier before seizing power in his home prefecture Luzhou in a military coup. The weak Tang court could only confirm his position. In 887 the governor of Huainan, Gao Pian, was captured by Bi Shiduo. Xingmi defeated Shiduo and captured the provincial capital Yangzhou later that year, but by then Pian had been put to death by Shiduo. Another rebel leader, Sun Ru had Shiduo killed and absorbed his forces. Yang Xingmi was forced to abandon Yangzhou and retreat to Luzhou. With Luzhou as his base, Xingmi increased his power by seizing neighbouring prefectures until he could recapture Yangzhou in 892. For this act, the Tang court granted him the military governorship of Huainan.

While still nominally loyal to the Tang dynasty, rival warlords were now carving out their own statelets. Yang Xingmi clashed with Zhu Wen of Later Liang in the north and Qian Liu of Wuyue in the south, successfully defending his territory. In 902 Yang Xingmi was named Prince of Wu by Emperor Zhaozong of Tang.

== Independence ==
Yang Xingmi died in 905 and was succeeded by his oldest son Yang Wo. In 907 Zhu Wen forced the last Tang emperor to abdicate and proclaimed himself the first emperor of the Later Liang. Yang Wo refused to acknowledge this change and continued the use of the last era name of Tang. From this point Wu was an independent, sovereign entity.

== Subversion of power by Xu Wen ==
Young and untested at his father's death Yang Wo had to rely on the director of the guard, Xu Wen, for his ascension, but later grew to resent Xu Wen's influence. However, before he could pull himself free, Yang Wo was assassinated by Xu Wen and his colleague Zhang Hao in 908. Wen and Hao had initially planned to divide Wu between themselves and submit to Liang, but they soon fell out. Xu Wen installed Yang Wo's younger brother Longyan and had Zhang Hao killed. Yang Longyan was a mere puppet with Xu Wen as the state's true ruler. Wen made himself Runzhou governor and moved his command to Jinling. The regular administration at the capital was left to his son Xu Zhixun. After Zhixun's murder in 918, this position was inherited by Wen's stepson, Zhigao. In 919, Yang Longyan proclaimed himself King of Wu and inaugurated a new era name, thus for the first time Wu officially claimed to be a sovereign state. Longyan died of illness in 922 and was succeeded by his brother, Xingmi's fourth son, Yang Pu. As before, Xu Wen had the real power. He prodded Yang Pu to proclaim himself emperor, but died in 927 before this could happen. 29 November 927 Yang Pu acceded the throne as Emperor of Wu. Xu Zhigao was made grand marshal and director of the Chancellery.

== Territorial Extent ==
The Wu capital was at Guangling (present-day Yangzhou), and held present-day central and southern Anhui, central and southern Jiangsu, much of Jiangxi, and eastern Hubei.

== End of the Kingdom ==
Xu Zhigao had been adopted by Xu Wen on Yang Xingmi's insistence and soon proved himself an able man. He came to power in Wu after his stepfather's death in 927 and continued to rule the state as governor of Jinling for some time. Finally in 937 he formally seized power for himself by proclaiming himself King of Qi and Yang Pu abdicated after suppressing the opposition of Yang Meng. Two years later, by claiming descent from a Tang prince Xu Zhigao and restoring his surname of Li, Xu Zhigao became Li Bian and proclaimed the restoration of the Tang. His state would be known to history as the Southern Tang.

== Rulers ==
- 904–905: Yáng Xíngmì 楊行密 (太祖孝武皇帝; Tài Zǔ Xiàowǔ Huángdì)
- 905–908: Yáng Wò 楊渥 (烈宗景皇帝; Liè Zōng Jǐng Huángdì)
- 908–921: Yáng Lóngyǎn 楊隆演 (高祖宣皇帝; Gāo Zǔ Xuān Huángdì)
- 921–937: Yáng Pǔ 楊溥 (睿皇帝; Ruì Huángdì)

== Wu and Southern Tang rulers family tree ==
Southern Tang and Wu

– Wu emperors; – Southern Tang emperors

Yang Xingmi 杨行密 852–905; Taizu 太祖 902–905	Xu Wen 徐溫 862–927; Yizu 義祖
Yang Wo 杨渥 886–908; Liezu 烈祖 (905–)907–908	Yang Longyan; 897–920; Gaozu 高祖; 908–920	Yang Pu 杨溥 900–938; Ruidi 睿帝; 920–937	Li Bian 李昪 888–943; Liezu 烈祖; 937–943	Xú Zhīxùn (elder) 徐知訓 d. 918	Xú Zhīxùn 徐知詢 d. 934; Kang of Donghai 東海康王
Yang Lian 杨琏 d. 940; Jing of Hongnong 弘農靖王	Princess; Yongxing 永兴公主; 917–940	Princess; Shangrao 上饶公主 d. 937	Xu Jingqian 徐景遷 919–937; Ding of Chu 楚定王	Li Jing 李璟 916–961; Yuanzong 元宗; 943–961	Li Jingsui 李景遂 920–958; Cr. Prince Wencheng 文成太弟	Li Jingda 李景達 924–971; Cr. Prince Zhaoxiao 昭孝太弟
Li Yu 李煜 937–978; Houzhu 后主; 961–975

== See also ==
- Five Dynasties and Ten Kingdoms period
