= Ding Dusai =

Chinese actress

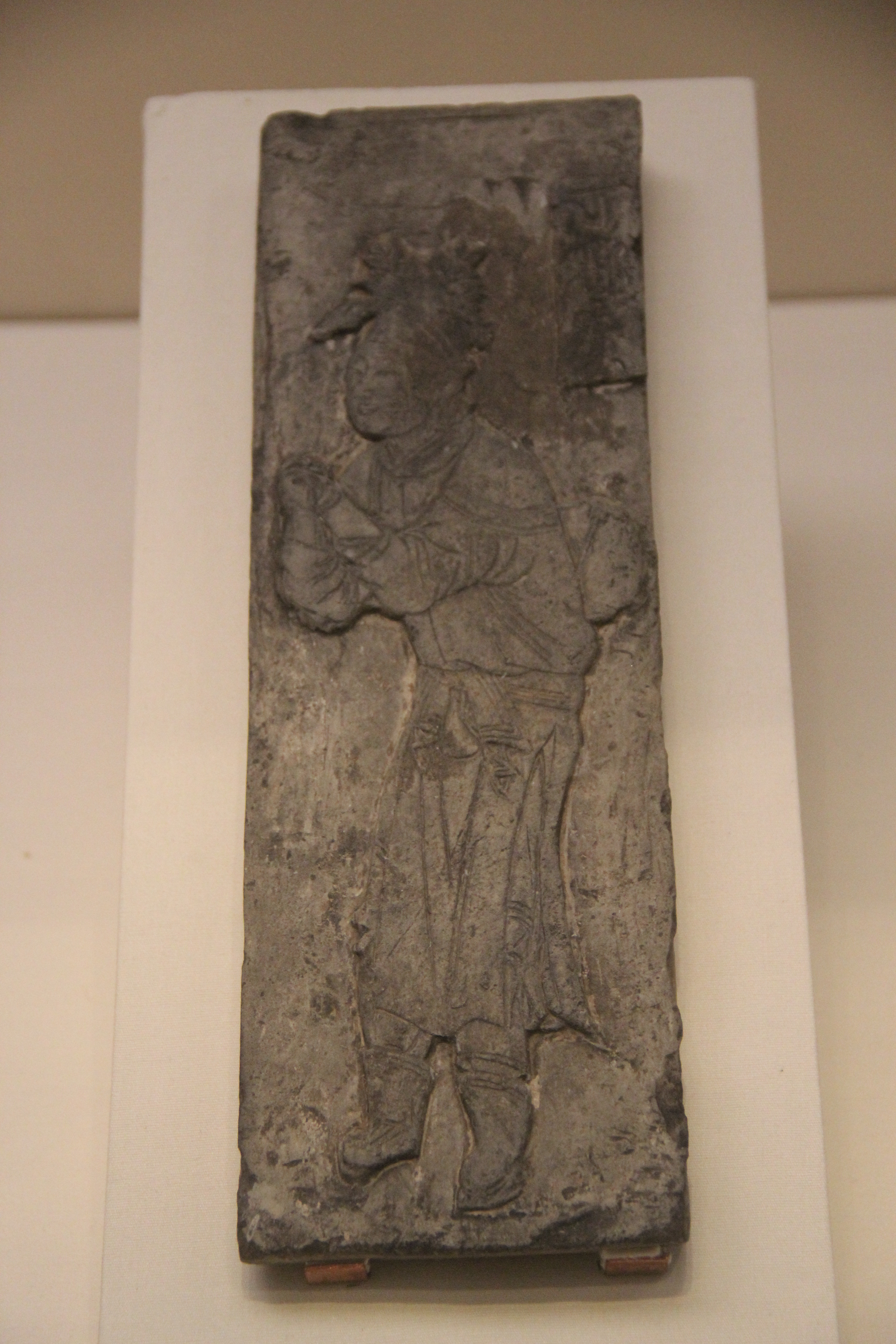
Brick relief portrait of Ding Dusai at the National Museum of China

Ding Dusai (Chinese: 丁都賽; pinyin: Dīng Dūsài) was a Chinese zaju actress of the Song dynasty, active in the Song capital Kaifeng between 1111 and 1125. Almost nothing is known about her, but a brick relief portrait of her has been discovered. It is the earliest surviving portrait of a named Chinese actor.

== Written record ==
Her name was recorded in the 1147 book Dongjing Meng Hua Lu by Meng Yuanlao. During the Qingming Spring Festival of an unspecified year, the emperor (Emperor Huizong of Song) watched six public (i.e. not palace-owned) actresses perform at the Pavilion of the Treasured Ford (寶津樓, baojinlou), after watching a performance by soldiers. The actresses were: Xiao Zhu'er (蕭柱兒), Ding Dusai, Xue Zida (薛子大), Xue Zixiao (薛子小), Yang Zongxi (楊揔惜), and Cui Shangshou (崔上壽). They were clearly well-known in the city.

== Portrait ==
Shortly before 1980, the National Museum of China acquired a grey clay brick decorated with a bas-relief that measures 28.4 × 9.3 cm. It was formerly in the hands of a private collector, who claimed that it was discovered in a tomb in Yanshi County (now a district under Luoyang). The name Ding Dusai was carved in the upper-right-hand corner in regular script. On her upper body she wears what appears to be Han Chinese clothing for men, and on her lower part diaodun (釣墩; a typical Khitan clothing). On her waist is a handkerchief, and on her back a moon-shaped fan. Her body is slightly bent, and her hands are folded in front.

Based on her attire and other records from the period, researcher Zhang Bin (张彬) has determined that Ding Dusai was a specialist in the (male) jester or fumo (副末) role (see yuanben).
