= Liu Shuahe =

Popular Chinese yuanben actor of the late Jin dynasty

Liu Shuahe (Chinese: 劉耍和; pinyin: Liú Shuǎhé; Wade–Giles: Liu^{2} Shua^{3}-ho^{2}) was a popular Chinese yuanben (or zaju) actor of the late Jin dynasty (1115–1234) who was active in the first half of the 13th century. He was a group leader of the Court Entertainment Bureau, and some yuanben and zaju plays were written about him.

Du Renjie (杜仁傑) in his sanqu Zhuangjia bushi goulan (莊家不識枸欄) referred to him as a "legendary celebrity". A source mentioned a great male actor surnamed Liu during the early Yuan dynasty who was good at kefan, or comedy skills, but it's unclear whether he was indeed Liu Shuahe.

Liu Shuahe's sons-in-law Hua Lilang (花李郎) and Hongzi Li Er (紅字李二) were both actors-turned-playwrights.
