= Canjunxi =

Form of Chinese performing art

- Traditional Chinese: 參軍戲
- Simplified Chinese: 参军戏
- Literal meaning: Adjutant play
Transcriptions
Standard Mandarin
- Hanyu Pinyin: Cānjūnxì

Nongcanjun
- Traditional Chinese: 弄參軍
- Simplified Chinese: 弄参军
- Literal meaning: Play adjutant
Transcriptions
Standard Mandarin
- Hanyu Pinyin: Nòngcānjūn

Canjunxi (Chinese: 參軍戲) or nongcanjun was a popular form of Chinese performing art during the Tang (618–907), Five Dynasties (907–960), and Song (960–1279) periods. Initially a comedy duet, canjunxi became more complex and by the late Tang dynasty featured a combination of music, dance, and storytelling.

Wang Guowei (1877–1927) believed it to be a primitive precursor of Chinese opera, while other scholars consider it to be more similar to certain forms of quyi, such as xiangsheng.

In Li Shangyin’s Tang‑dynasty poem The Poem of My Darling Son (嬌兒詩), he writes: "Suddenly he imitates the cangjun actor, and in a lowered voice calls out to Canghu" (忽複學參軍，按聲喚蒼鶻). This depicts the poet’s little boy at play, mimicking adults by performing scenes from the cangjunxi, humorously lowering his voice to summon Canghu (蒼鶻), the clownish supporting role in that performance tradition.

== Origin ==
According to a passage from Zhao Shu (趙書; "Book of Zhao") quoted in the 983 book Taiping Yulan, canjunxi originated from the Later Zhao dynasty (319–351) during the Sixteen Kingdoms period. The adjutant (Chinese: 參軍; pinyin: cānjūn) Zhou Yan (周延) once embezzled several hundred bolts of official silk as the magistrate of Guantao and ended up in prison. Later Zhao's emperor Shi Le pardoned him, but humiliated him whenever there was a gathering. At these banquets, Zhou had to wear yellow silk clothes and perform comedy duets with another entertainer. When asked what his title was, Zhou would flutter his clothes and reply "I was the magistrate of Guantao once, but have been reduced to your ranks after embezzling these!" as everyone laughed.

Another theory was that canjunxi originated from the Eastern Han period (25–220).

== Style ==
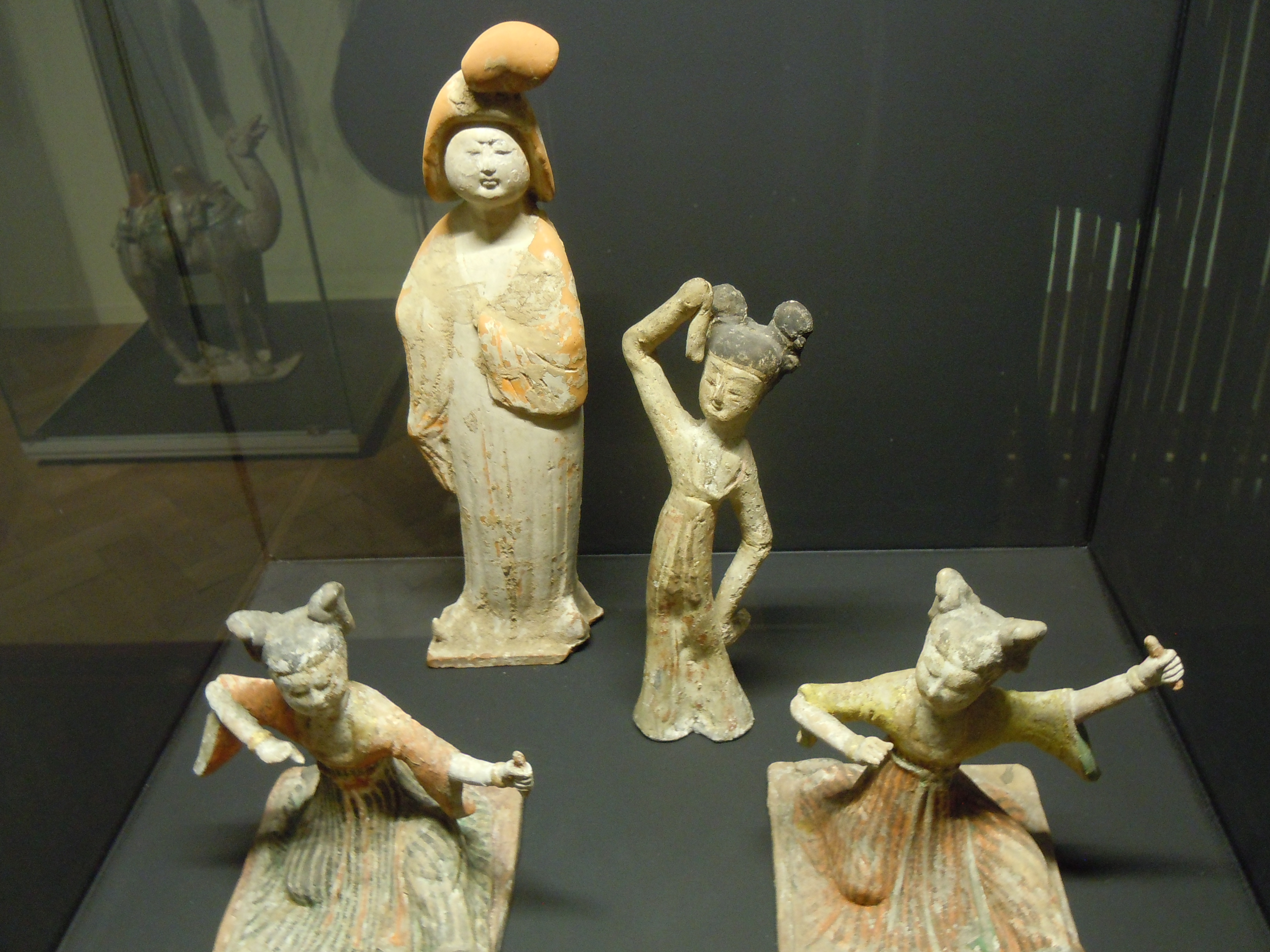
Grave figures of ladies in waiting, dancers and musicians, from the Sui or Tang periods. Náprstek Museum, Prague, Czech Republic.

The comedic canjunxi involved two performers, known as canjun ("adjutant") and canghu (traditional Chinese: 蒼鶻; simplified Chinese: 苍鹘; pinyin: cānghú; lit. 'blue falcon'). By the late Tang dynasty, there was evidence that female performers had emerged, and that a new style might have been formed by incorporating features of gewuxi (歌舞戲, "a sort of narrative ballet in which the dancers sometimes spoke simple dialog") into canjunxi. Research on the 966 Japanese gagaku text Shinsen Gakufu (新撰樂谱, shinjitai: 新撰楽譜, "New Selections of Sheet Music") also suggests that canjunxi was closely related to a musical style called canjun and featured dancing, at least in the late-Tang period.

The late-Tang play Lu Canjun (Chinese: 陸參軍; lit. 'Adjutant Lu') was the first known canjunxi which clearly told a story, that of Lu Yu (733–804), a tea master who was also once an entertainer. Canjunxi at some point evolved into early forms of Chinese opera, possibly in the 12th century, becoming yuanben in the Jin dynasty (1115–1234) and zaju in the Southern Song dynasty (1127–1279).
