= Fashion in the Liao dynasty =

Liao dynasty fashion

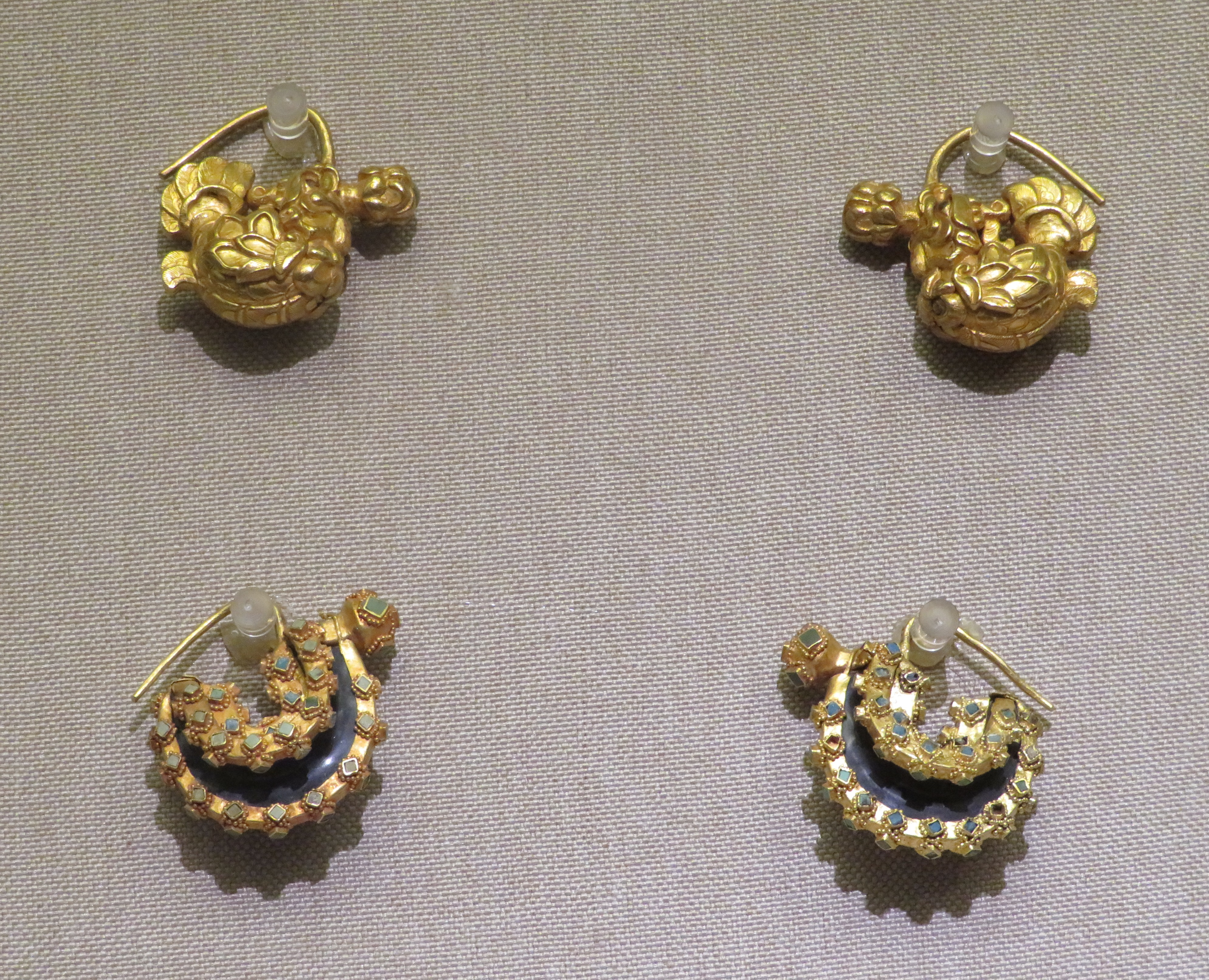
Gold earrings, Liao dynasty

After the fall of the Tang dynasty, the Khitans, a branch of the Eastern Xianbei tribes, established Liao dynasty (AD 916–1125) in northern China. The Liao dynasty comprised two regions: the Northern and Southern Divisions. The Northern divisions of Liao was mainly composed of tribal Khitan people while the Southern regions was composed of the Han and other sedentary groups. The rulers of the Liao dynasty adopted a clothing system which allowed the coexistence of Han and Khitan clothing.

== Development of dual clothing system ==
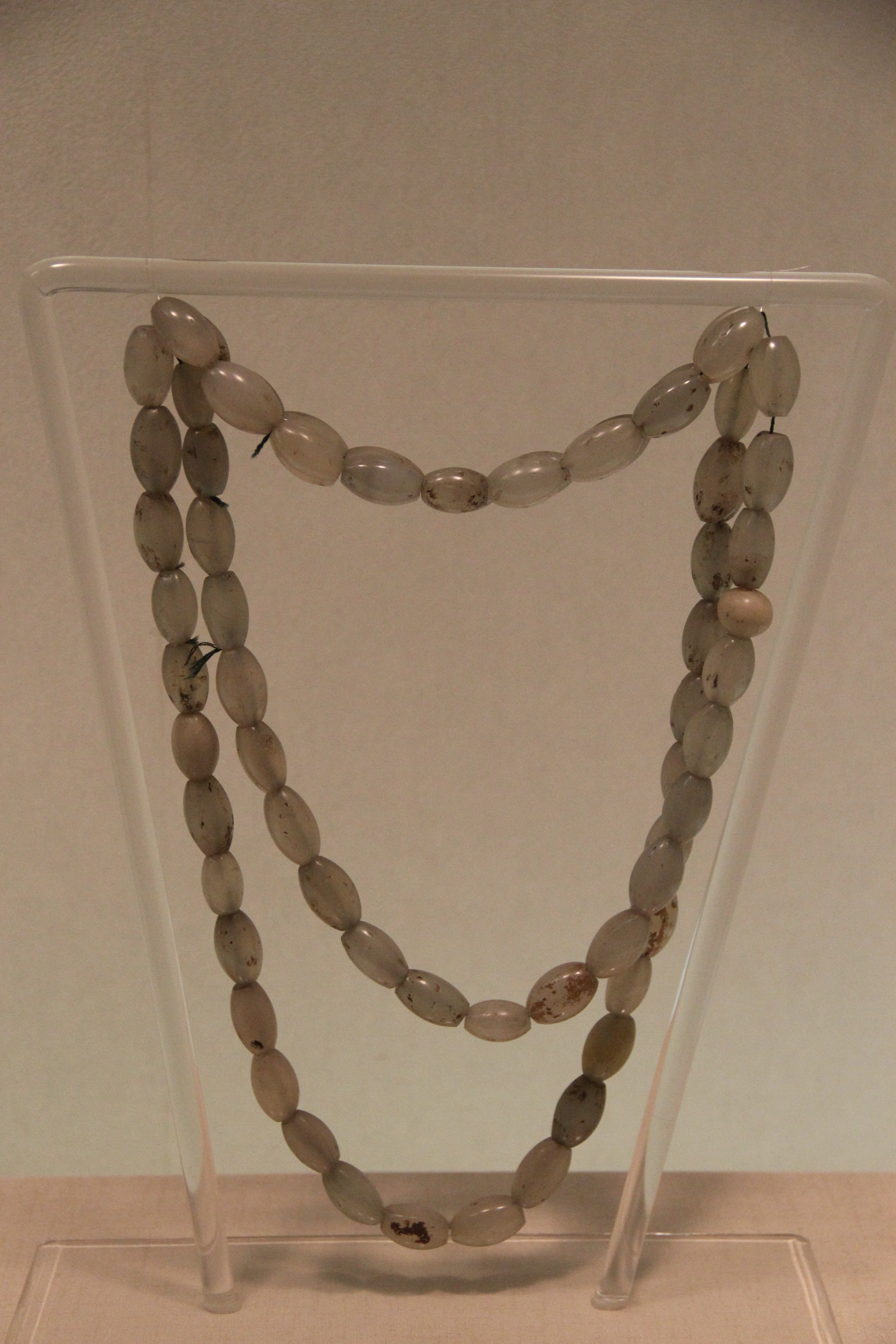
Liao dynasty jade necklace

According to the History of Liao, the earliest clothing worn by the Khitan used to made with animal hides, and it is only during the reign of Emperor Taizong of Liao that an apparel system was developed. Culturally, the Khitan was closer to the Tang dynasty culture than the Song dynasty culture; and under the influence of Tang dynasty culture, they started to include silk garments (e.g. jackets and robes) to their wardrobe and conform their clothing customs to the clothing customs of the Tang dynasty, thus fashioning themselves in Han Chinese-style while maintaining some distinction in their attire. According to scholar Linda Cooke Johnson, by the 11th century AD, Chinese influences dating from Tang dynasty period appears to have been thoroughly integrated in the Liao culture.

The Khitan court adopted a dual dress system, which consisted of both the guofu (國服; "State-style", i.e. "Khitan National garments" or "Khitan state" clothing) and hanfu (漢服; Han Chinese clothing) (which are basically Tang and/or Song dynasty-style clothing), which the Khitan inherited from the Later Jin dynasty and were actually clothing from the Tang dynasty. The guofu of the Liao dynasty was also heavily influenced by the Han Chinese clothing system. In the Liao shi, the gongfu (i.e. Khitan state official dress) was purple in colour; the colour purple was used in the robes of both Liao officials and the Liao emperor as a standard practice. According to the Liao shi, "The system for official dress was regulated. The Khitan style was worn in the north, and the Han style worn in the south; each was determined according to convenience" during the reign of Abaoji; however, the types of clothing worn were not always based on this northern vs southern division.

In the Liao dynasty, Khitan officials and the Liao empresses wore Khitan clothes, but the Han Chinese officials and Liao emperor wore Song dynasty clothes (Han Chinese clothing); according to Liao shi, "During the Huitong 會同 period [937-947] the Empress Dowager [Yingtian] and Northern officials wore Khitan state- style dress; the Emperor [太宗, Yelü Deguang 耶律德光] and southern officials wore Han-style dress...". However, in the opinion of the Song Chinese, their garments were closed in barbarian fashion (左衽 zuoren), closing on the left side instead of the right side (右衽 youren). After 970 AD, it was decreed that all top Khitan officials had to be dressed in Chinese style clothing while the lower officials of Khitan origins had to continue to wear their native dress for the Great Willowtree Shooting ceremony (大射柳; dasheliu) when praying for rain.

After 983 AD, the court dress which follows the Tang-Song style was worn at both Liao courts, i.e. in both Northern and Southern courts. According to the Liao shi, "After the fifth year of the Qianheng 乾亨reign [983] when the Shengzong 聖宗 Emperor [Yelü Longxu 耶律隆緒] conferred the title of Empress Dowager on Chengtian, all of the officials above 3rd rank wore Han-style formal dress [fafu 法服]".

In 1036 AD, the Emperor wore the dragon robe and officials in the North and South wore court dress of Han-style. According to Liao shi, "According to the record of the zunhao ceremony 尊號冊禮 [in which a title was conferred on the emperor] in the 5th year of Chongxi 重熙 [1036], following [the zunhao ceremony] the Emperor [Xingzong 興宗, Yelü Zongzhen 耶律宗真] wore the dragon robe and the officials from both the north and south wore [Han style] court dress...".

In 1055 AD, the emperor decreed that all Khitan officials had to wear Chinese-style clothing. After the Chongxi period (1032-1055), all court officials wore Han clothing in important rituals whereas the daily ceremonial dress remained the same as the one used in the Huitong period.

=== Khitan clothing ===
Based on mural paintings from Khitan tombs during the Liao dynasty, a typical outer garment worn by the Khitan men is a narrow-sleeved, round-collar gown which falls just above the ankles, and opens from the waist down on both sides but not in the front and back; they also wear a belt around the hip area. The lapels of their outer garments appears to be right lapels crossing over the left, and they also fastened their lapels on the left under the arm. Dark colour such grey-green, grey-blue, brown and dark green were the preferred colour used.

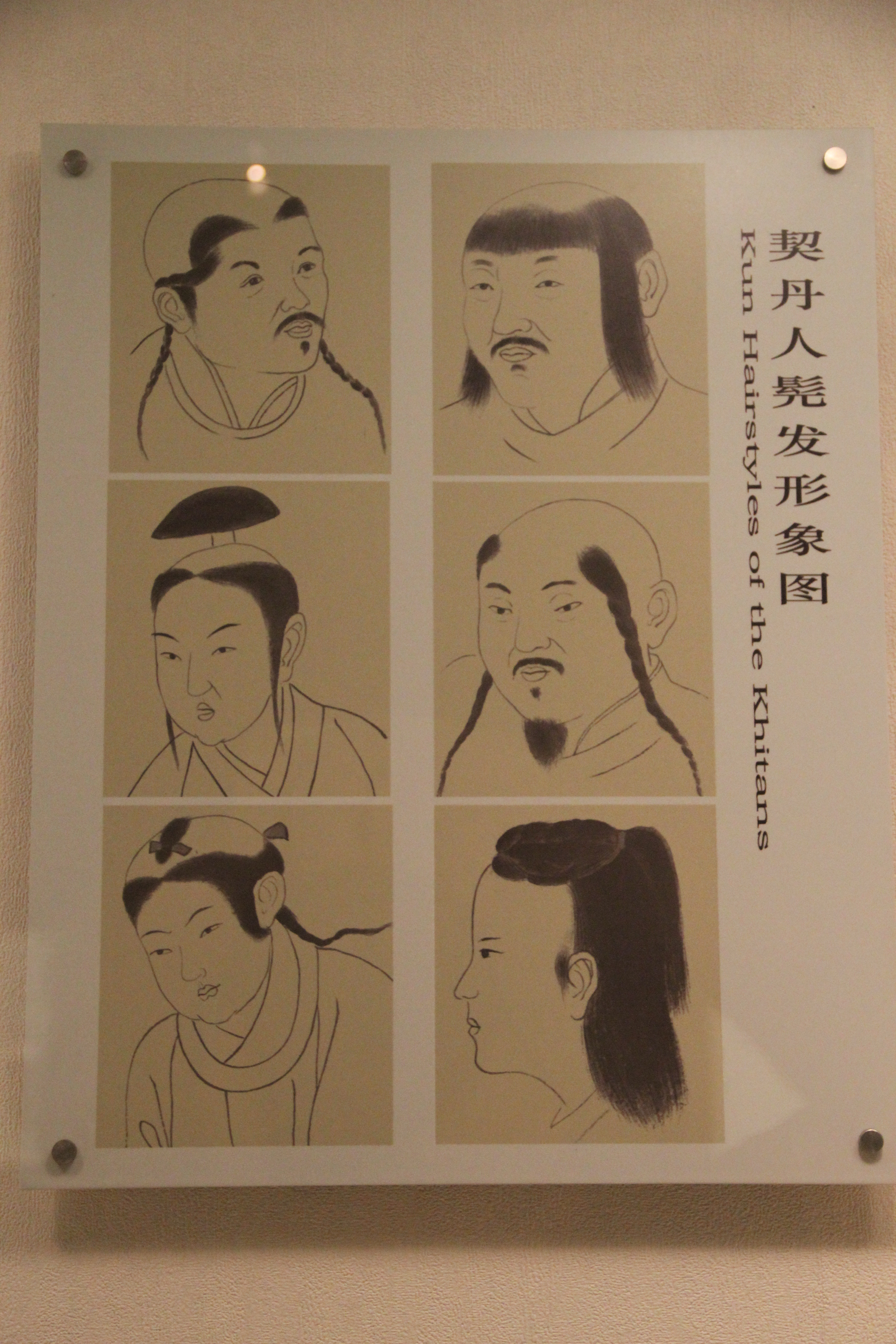
Liao Khitan Hair styles

The inner garment of Khitan's man was a short garment or tunic worn under the round-collar gown. They also wore trousers and high-topped boots which were either bordered or rolled at the top. Khitan officials used gold ornamented ribbons to found their hair locks around their foreheads, covering their heads with felt hats according to the Ye Longli's Qidan Guozhi. Khitan wore felt hats, fur clothes and woollen cloth and the Liao emperor switched between Han and Khitan clothing.

Kithan's men hairstyle was called kunfa (髡髮) according to Chinese texts. Khitan wore the long side fringes & shaved pates. Tomb murals of Khitan hairstyle show only some hair remaining near the neck and forehead with the rest of the head shaved. Only at the temples were hair left while the crown was shaven. The absence of Khitan clothes and hairstyles on a painting of riders previously identified as Khitan has lad to experts questioning their purported identity. Khitan males grew hair from their temples but shaved the crown of their heads. Khitan men might have differentiate between classes by wearing different patterns on their small braids hanging off their shaved foreheads. They wore the braids occasionally with a forehead fringe with some shaving off all the forehead. Khitan men left only two separate patches of hair on each of the forehead's sides in front of each ear in tresses while they shaved the top of their head.

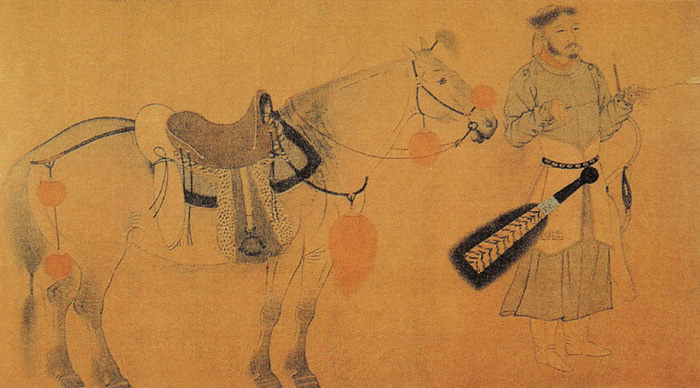
Yelü Bei, the eldest son of Emperor Taizu of Liao.

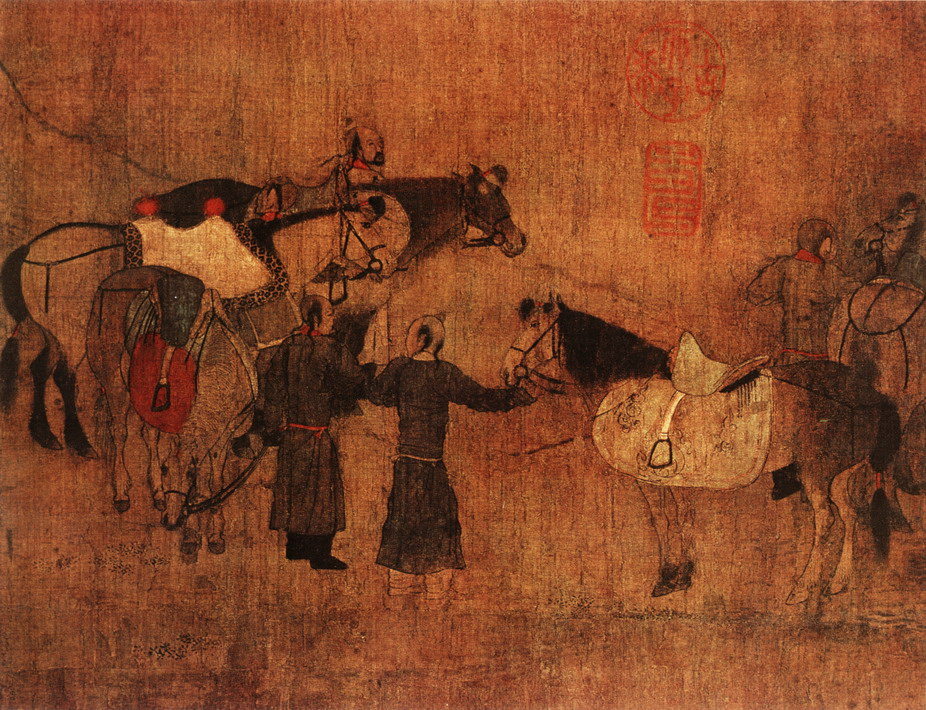
Liao horsemen at rest

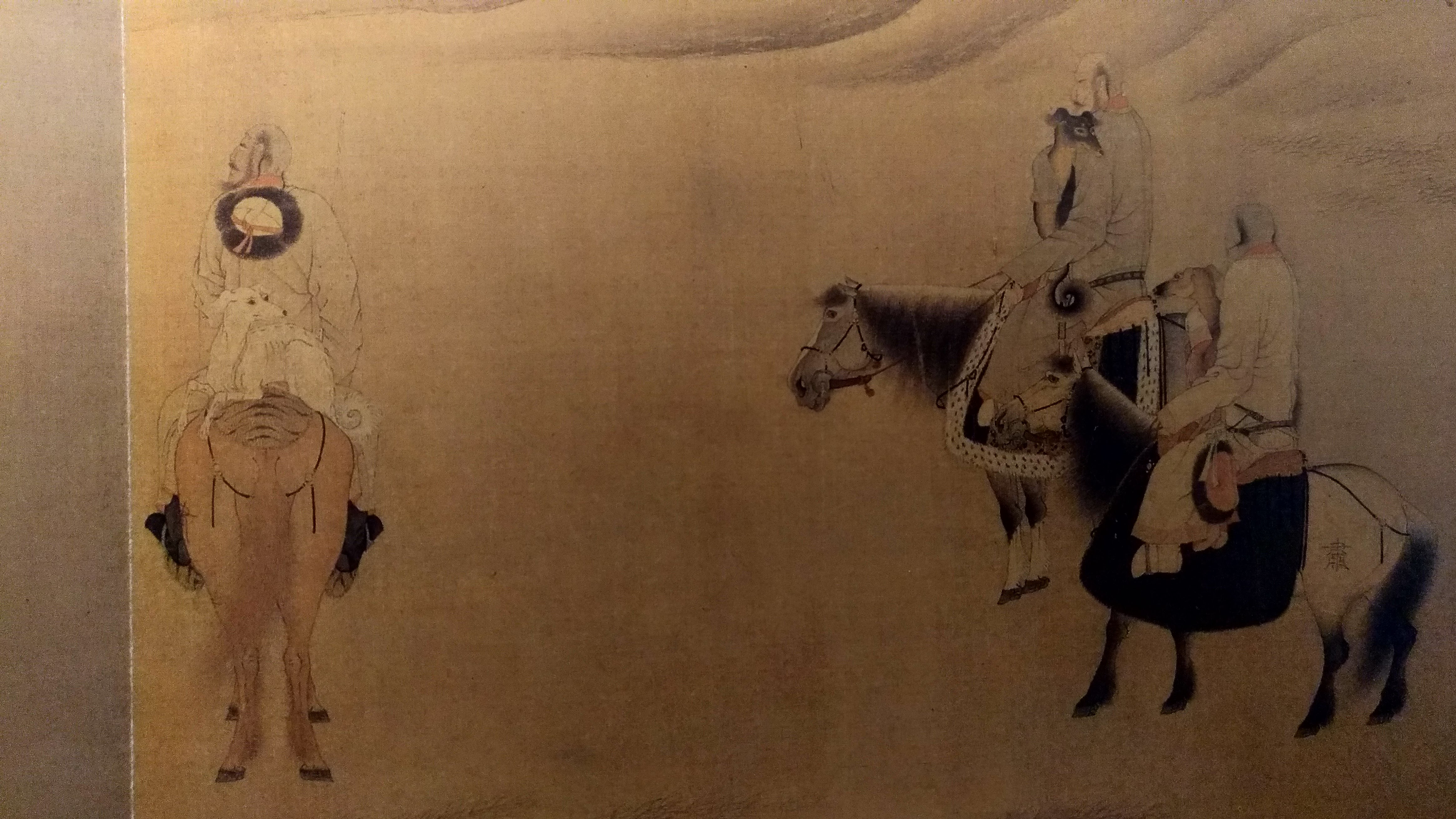
Khitan Horsemen

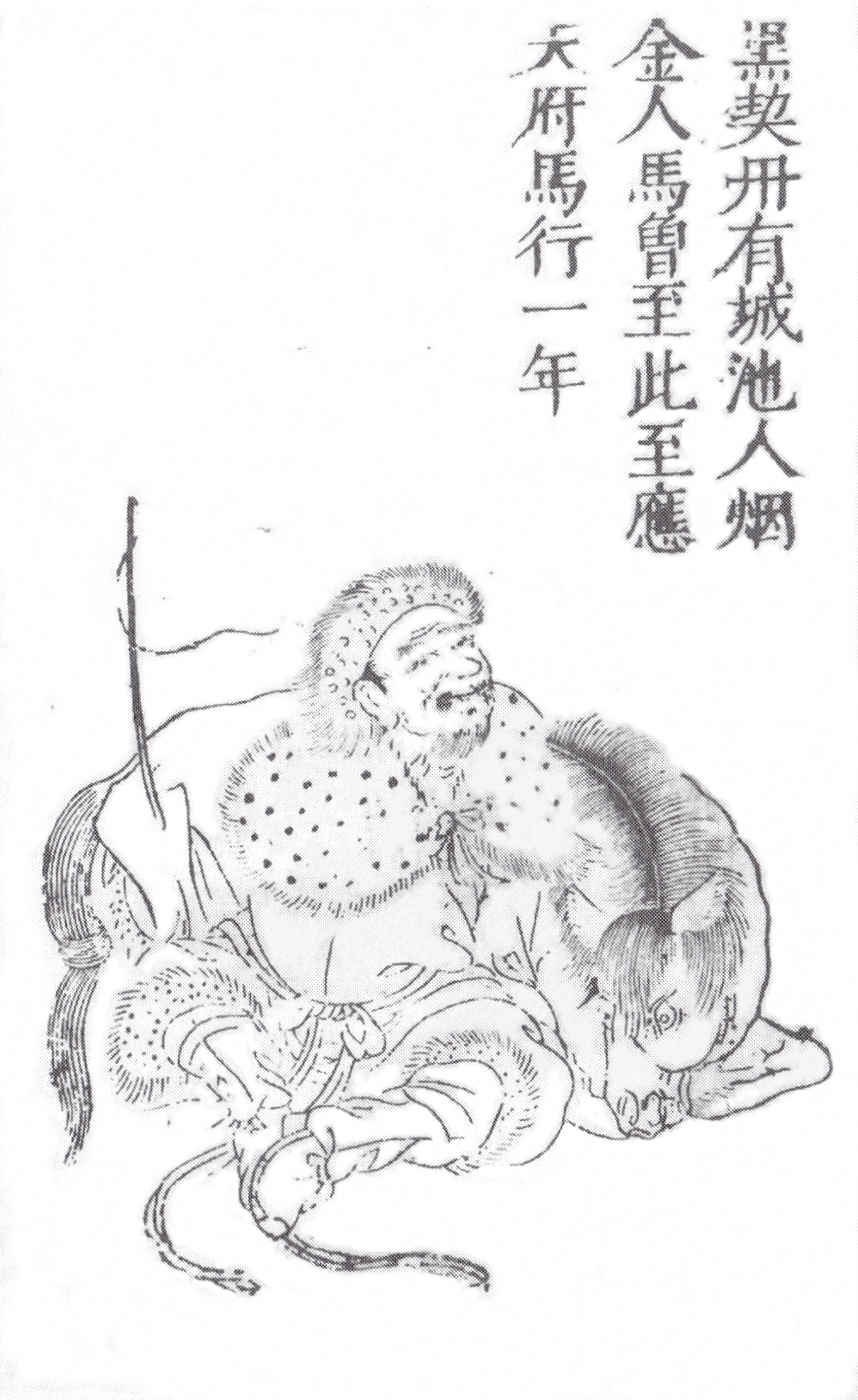
A Kara-Khitai man

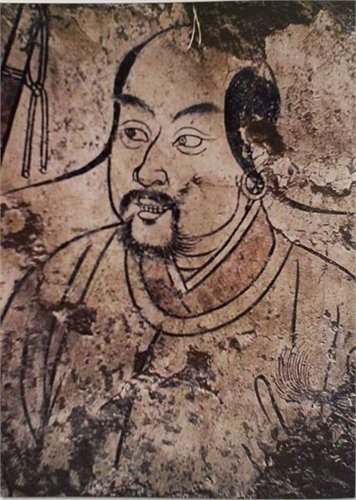
A Khitan man hairstyle, Beisanjia Tomb No.1, Liao dynasty.

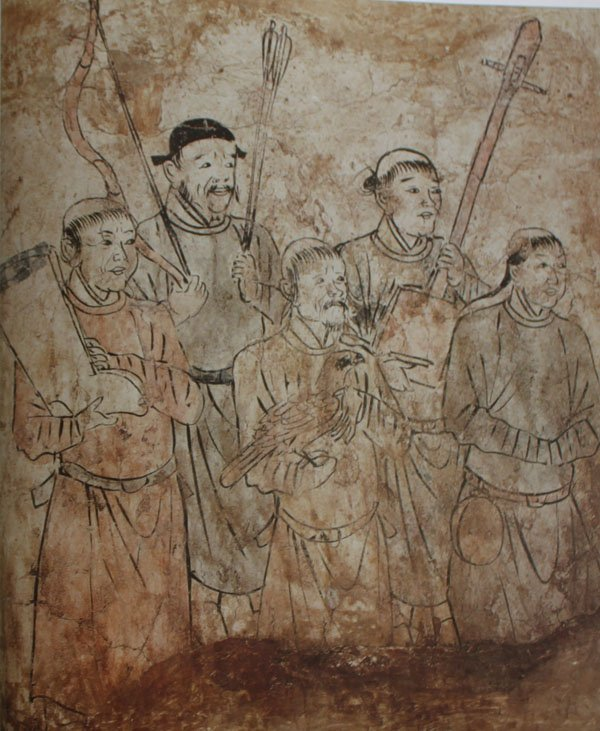
Liao men preparing for hunt, mural from tomb of Aohan, Lian dynasty.

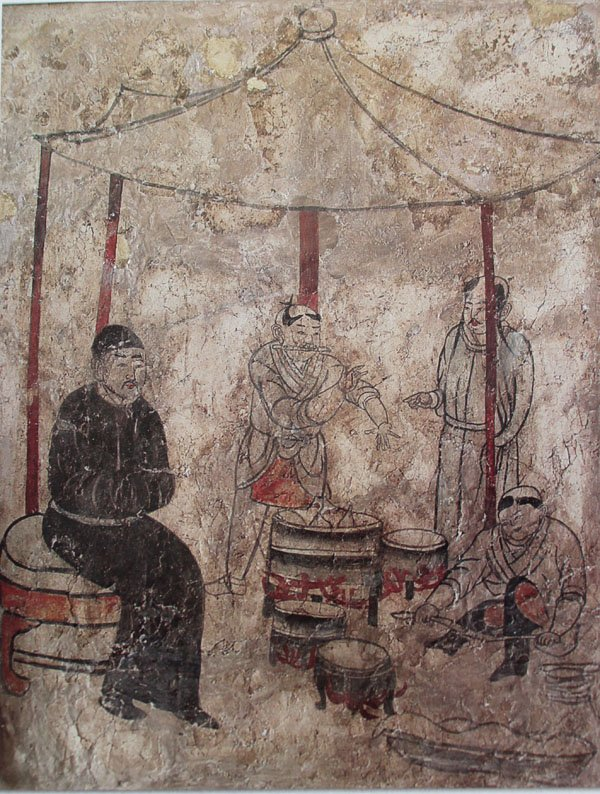
Liao cooks, Tomb in Aohan, Liao dynasty.

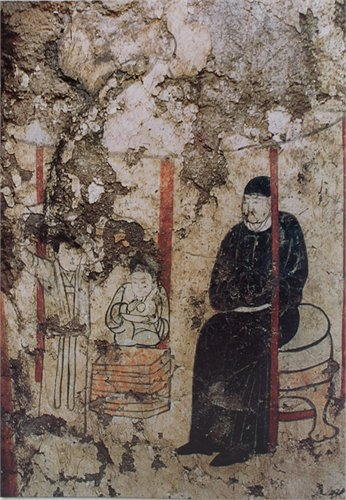
Preparing drinks, Mural from Tomb in Aohan, Liao Dynasty

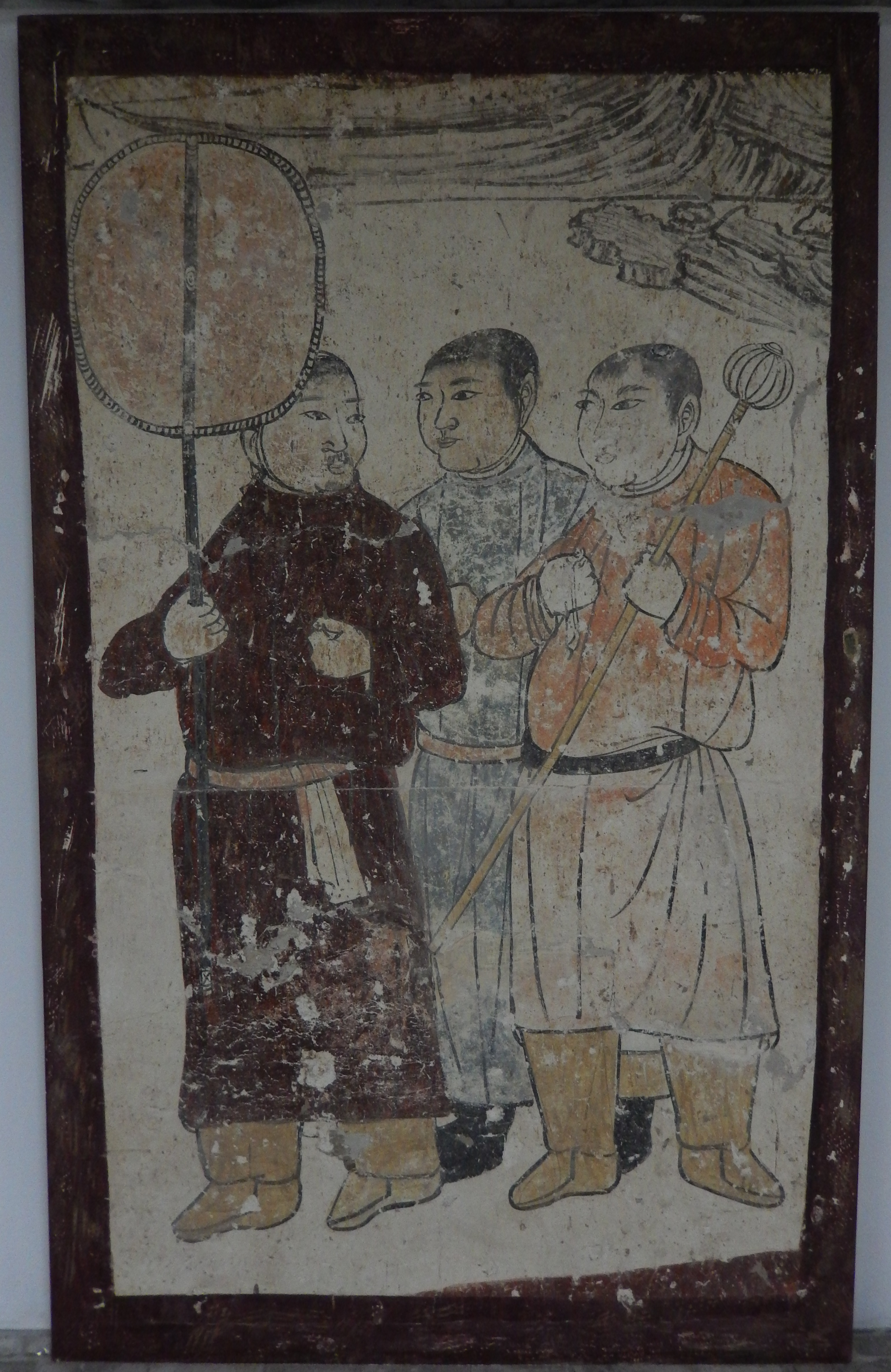
Halahaichang Liao tomb mural

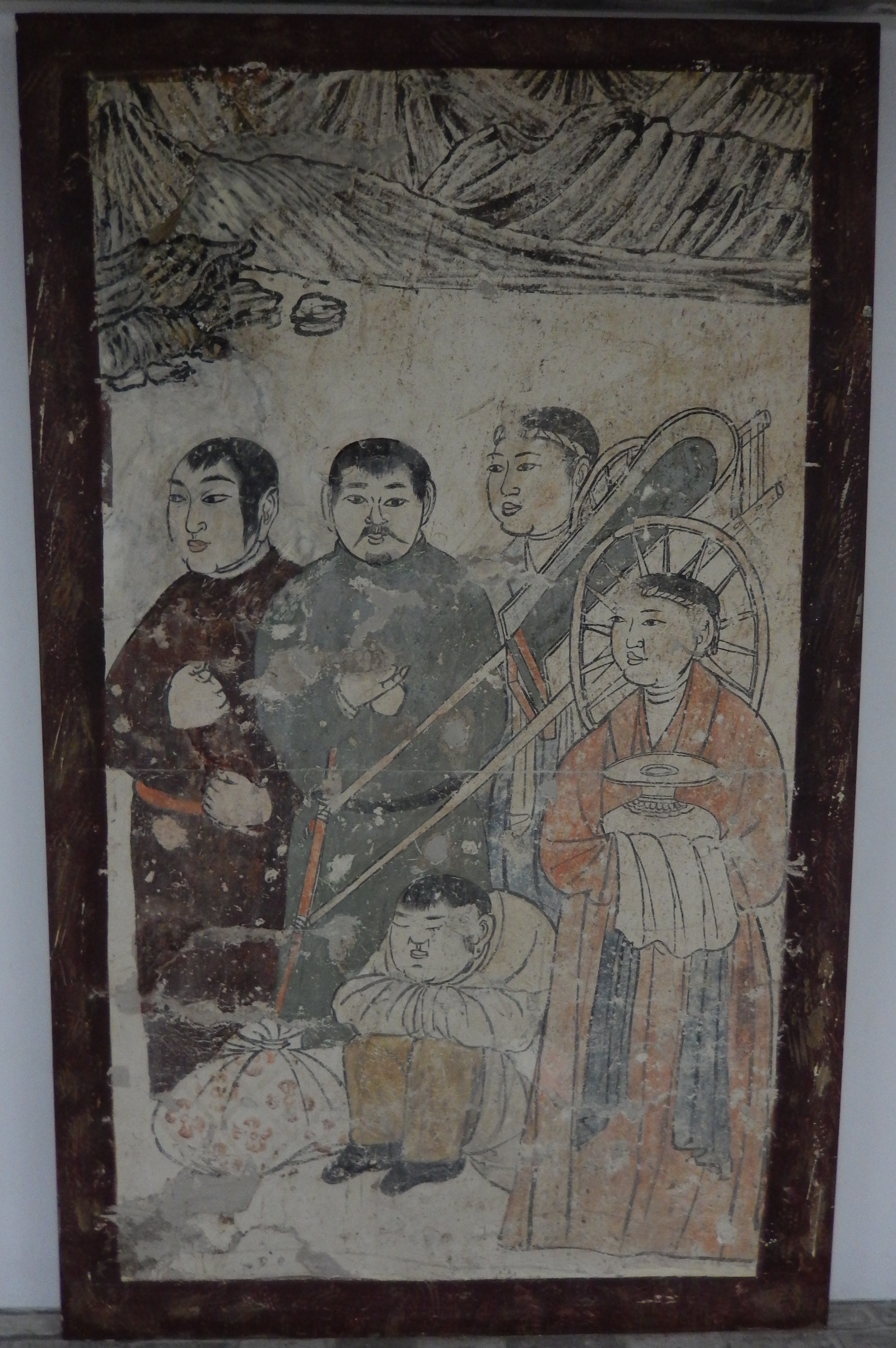
People depicted in Halahaichang Liao tomb.

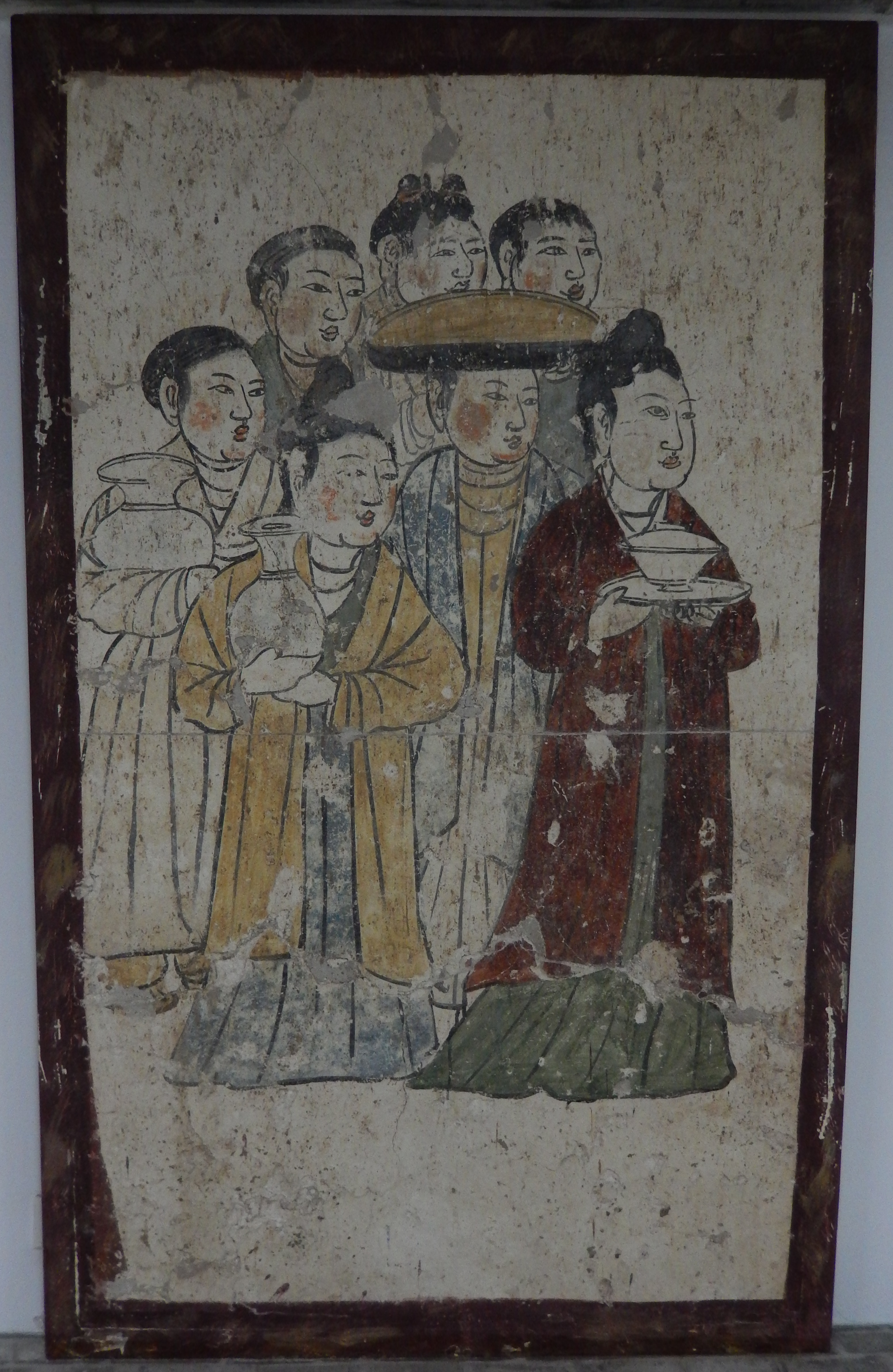
Women depicted in the Halahaichang (哈拉海場) Liao tomb mural.

Khitan-style clothing for women also existed and were often depicted in Liao tombs in settings associated with nomadic lifestyle and horseback-riding. Khitan women were skilled riders, and their clothing were well suited for riding and herding. The women Khitan-style clothing a long outer robe which long sleeves, which was belted at the waist. This form of dress appeared to be multi-layered in order to keep warm as they lived in harsher climates in the northern regions. Those types of clothing are often depicted in the tombs painting in the Kulunqi tombs which were most likely constructed for the Xiao clan, an elite clan in Liao. Fur caps also appeared to be worn. A Liao tomb found near Kulunqi village depicts a wedding ceremony of Liao princess and Khitan noblemen in a set of wall paintings; these wall paintings provide information about the Khitan's society, including Khitan's dress.

Khitan women also wore tight-sleeved, cross-collared long robes which were mostly buttoned on the left side and were tied at the waist with a silk band. Fabric belt could also be tied just below the breasts level to close to their robes. Khitan women also wore skirts but they were mostly worn under their long robe. Khitan women wore boots, including high boots. This form of left sided, cross-collared robe is depicted in the painting "Zuo Xie tu" (卓歇图) by Hu huai. The long sleeved outer robe which closes to the left is the most defining feature of the Kithan-style women clothing. King Hyonjong of Goryeo had been said to have composed a poem in 1018 stating, "Had it not been for Kang, evermore would our coats on the left be bound", when Kang Kamch'an won against the invading Khitans.

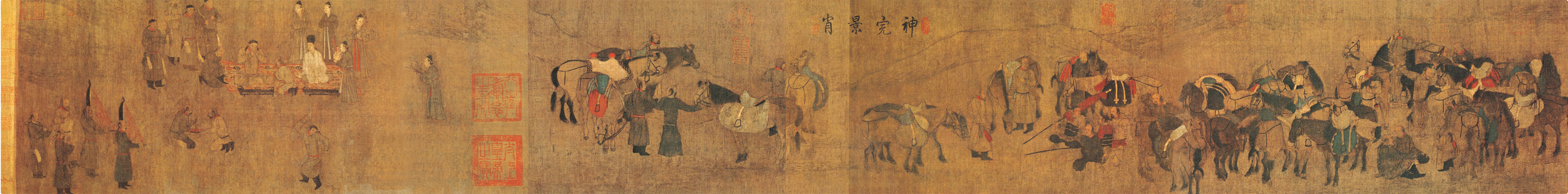
Painting "Zuo Xie tu" (卓歇图) by Hu huai, ca. 10th century. On the left side of the painting, Khitan women are depicted wearing tight-sleeved robes with left opening. Khitan men are depicted wearing round collared robes.

=== Han Chinese clothing ===
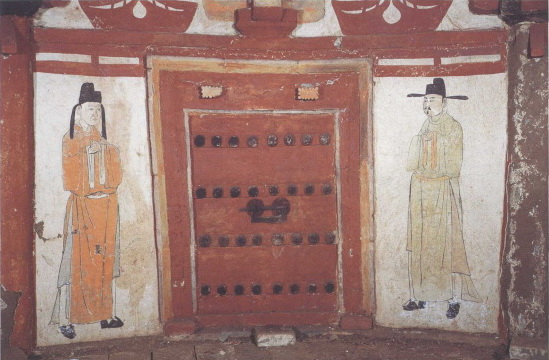
Men depicted in the Fresco of Xu Congyun's Tomb, North Part

The Han Chinese men living in the Liao dynasty were not required to wear the shaved Khitan hairstyle which Khitan men wore to distinguish their ethnicity, unlike the Qing dynasty which mandated wearing of the Manchu hairstyle for men. In Han Chinese tombs dating from Liao dynasty, there are tombs murals which depicts purely Chinese customs and Chinese clothing.

Tombs in haner families (i.e. Han Chinese of mixed origins or who have adopted some Khitan customs), for example the Zhang and Hann families, often depicts men dressed in Khitan clothing in corridors and antechambers while inner culture shows haner culture. Some Han Chinese or Haner men adopted and mixed or combined Han clothing with Khitan clothing with Khitan boots and Han clothes or wearing Khitan clothes. Han women on the other hand did not adopt Khitan dress and continued wearing Han dress. For example, the tomb of Hann Shixun (a man from distinguished haner families) who died in the early 12th century during the late Liao dynasty depict Khitan-style clothing in the antechamber whereas women in Han Chinese-style clothing is seen in the painting found in the inner chamber. Another example can be seen in a mural painting found in the tomb of Zhao Wenzao, where children and servants are depicted wearing Khitan hairstyles and Khitan-style clothing, while the woman who is standing behind the table is depicted in Han Chinese clothing. During the Liao dynasty, Han Chinese women living in the Southern Division and Haner women were culture bearers, who generally preserved Han Chinese culture and continued to wear the Han Chinese clothing which was worn prior to the conquest. In a tomb at Zhaitang, there are two female servants depicted standing by the doorway wearing Chinese clothing.

From at least the Han dynasty, Non-Han women (regardless of their social status or cultural identity), who lived closed to the Han dynasty territories, often adopted Han-Chinese style clothing while their Non-Han men did not; this clothing trend can be seen in the Tang dynasty depictions, and this trend continued until the Mongol period. The Liao had both Han Chinese Tang and Song dynasty-style clothes and Khitan clothes. Both Khitan women and Han Chinese women in the Liao wore the Han Chinese style Tang-Song dress. Tang-Song style clothing women clothing in Liao also included a long-sleeved, outer jacket with ample sleeves which could cropped or waist-length, was tied with sash in a bow below the breasts to create an empire silhouette. The outer jacket was worn over floor-length dress which was worn a short overskirt (which looked like an apron) on top. In Northern Liao mural tombs depictions, women who are dressed in Han style clothing are depicted in Tang dynasty fashion whereas in the Southern Liao murals, women dressed in Han style clothing are wearing Song-style clothing. The Song-style fashion for women consisted of long narrow skirts and jackets which closes to the right. These jackets could be worn over the narrow skirts, which was a contemporary Song style fashion.

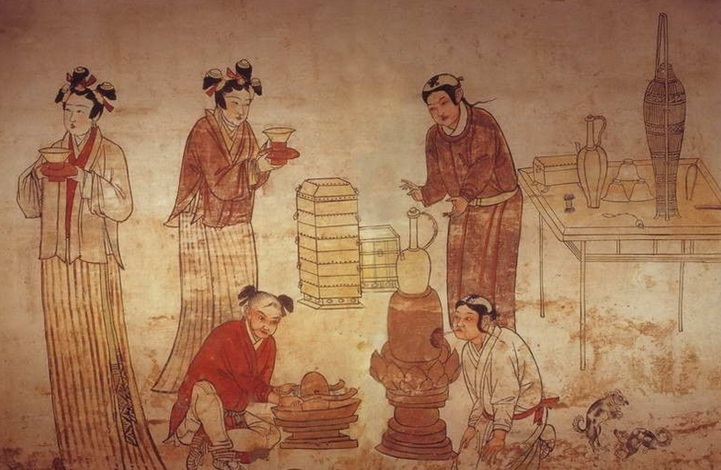
Mural painting from the Tomb of Zhang Kuangzheng (M10), Liao dynasty, 1058-1093 AD. Children and servants wear Khitan-style clothing and hairstyle; the standing women wears Han Chinese clothing. The hairstyle of the women is Khitan-style.

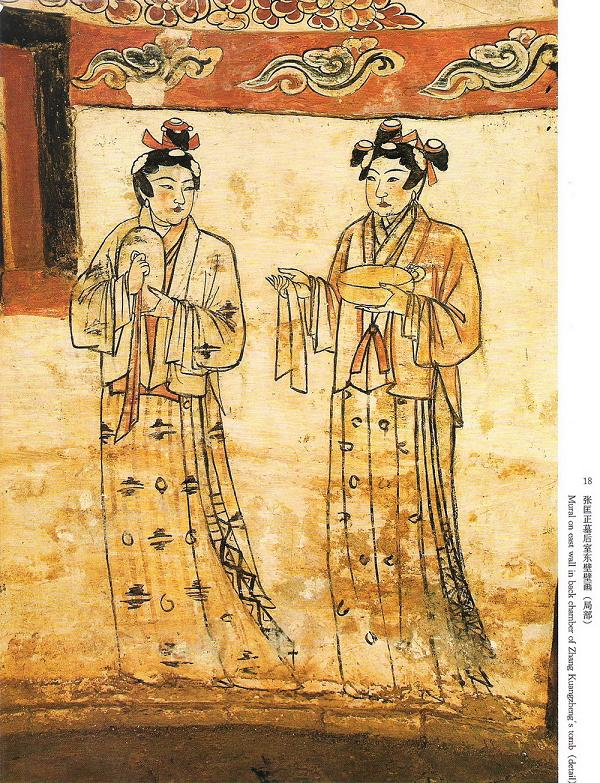
Women possibly wearing shanqun (upper garment over skirt) and beizi (Song-style clothing), inner chamber of the Tomb of Zhang Kuangzheng, Liao dynasty. The hairstyle is Khitan-style.

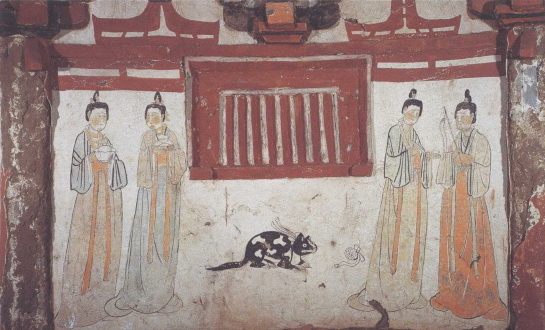
A form of Tang-Song style clothing; Xu Congyun's Tomb, Liao dynasty.

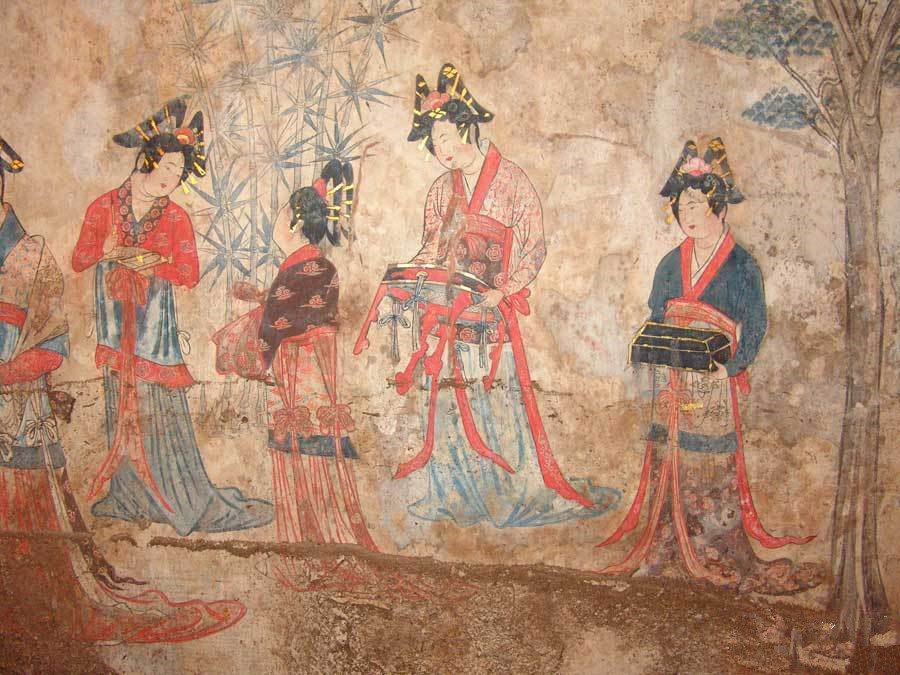
Women wearing Tang-style clothing; Baoshan tomb No.2 wall-painting of Liao dynasty.

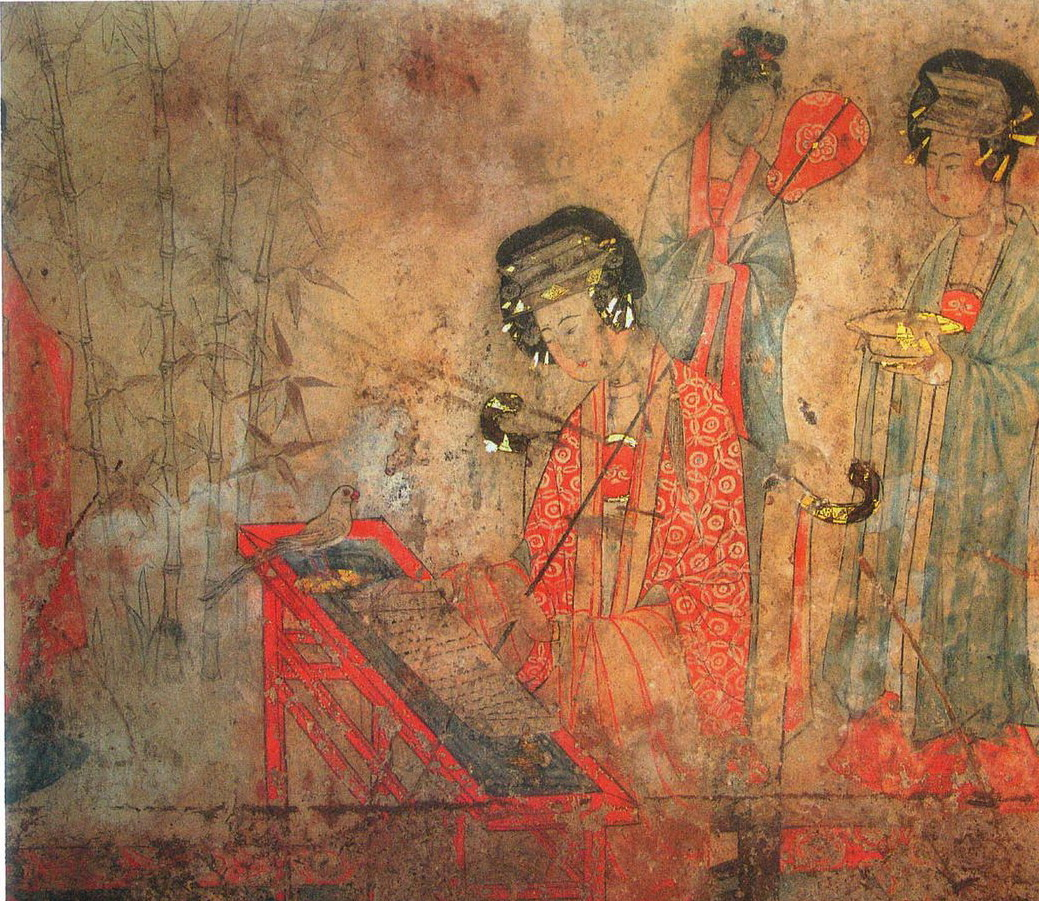
Women wearing Tang-style clothing; Baoshan tomb No.2 wall-painting of Liao dynasty.

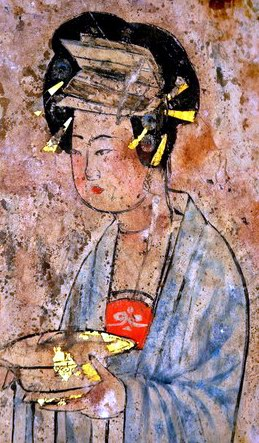
Women wearing Tang-style clothing; Baoshan Tomb No.2, Liao dynasty.

== Gallery ==
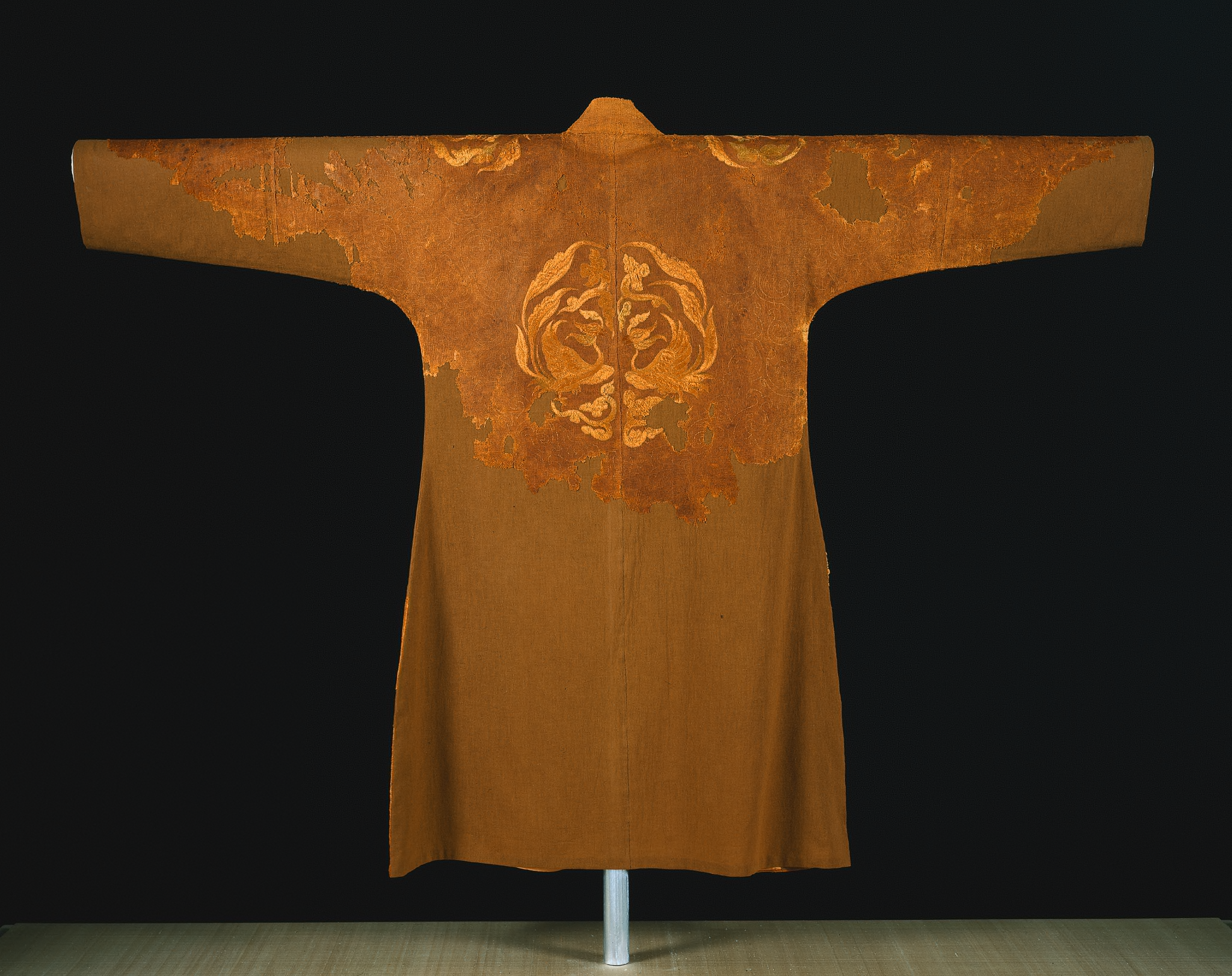
Imperial women's robe (back view), Liao dynasty.

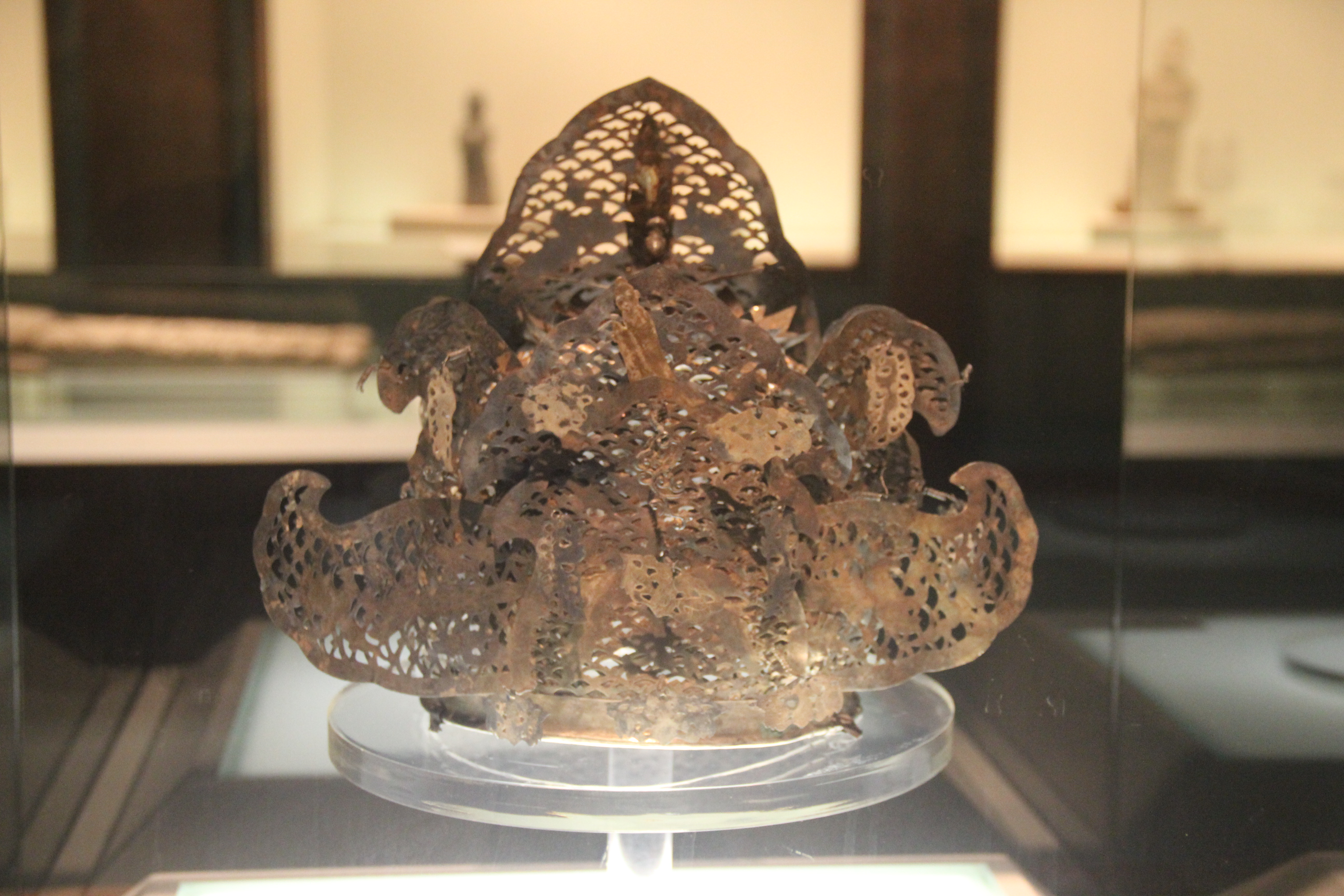
Silver crown with phoenix, Liao dynasty.

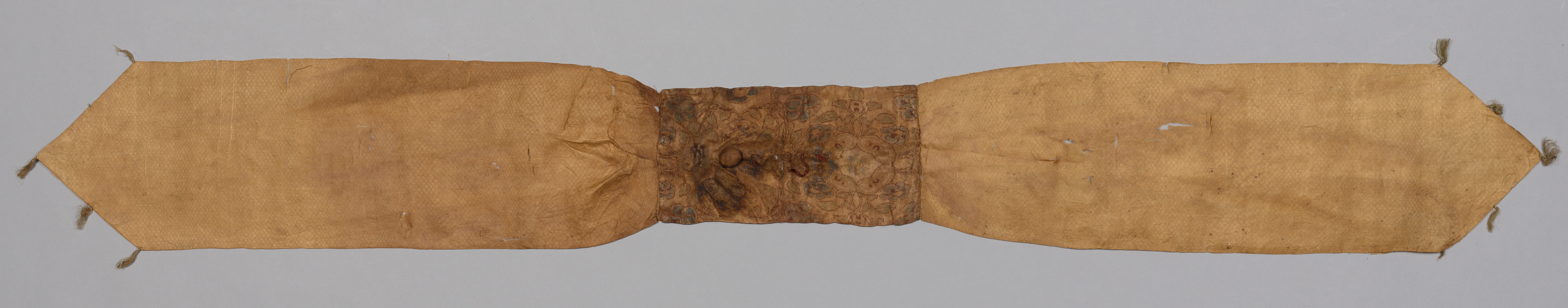
Silk belt, Liao dynasty.

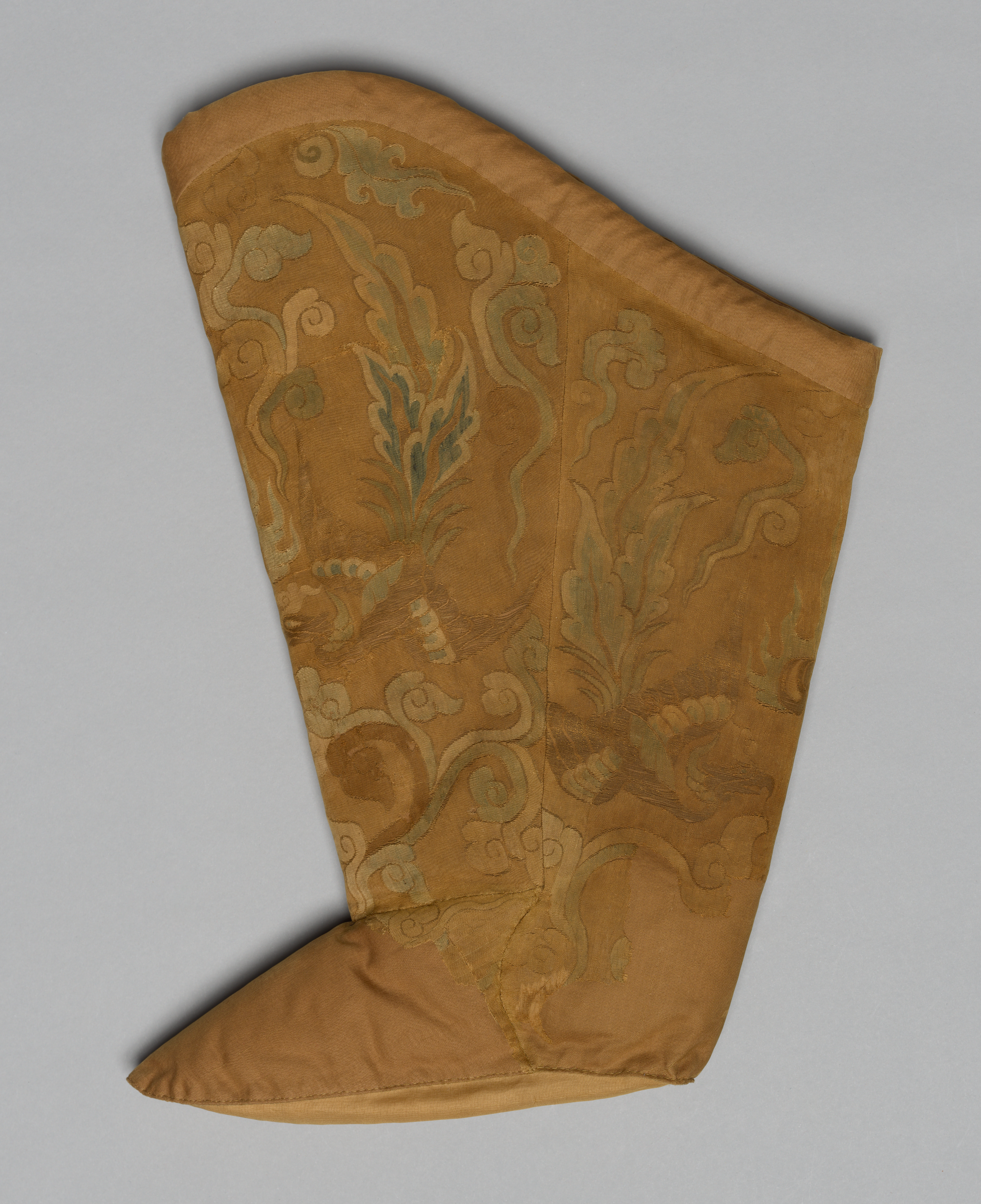
Kesi boots for Imperial family, Liao dynasty

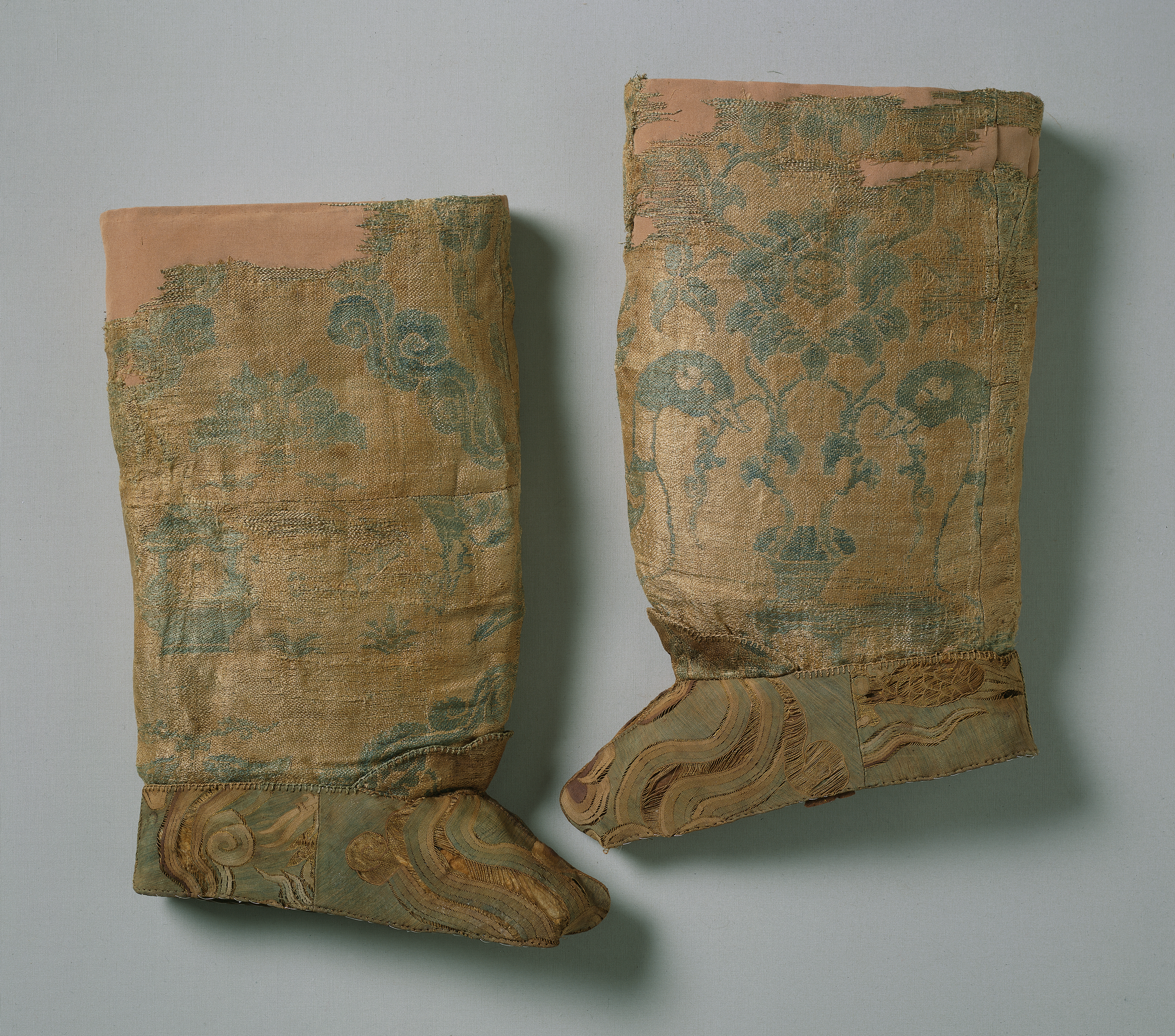
Kesi boots for court officials, Liao dynasty.

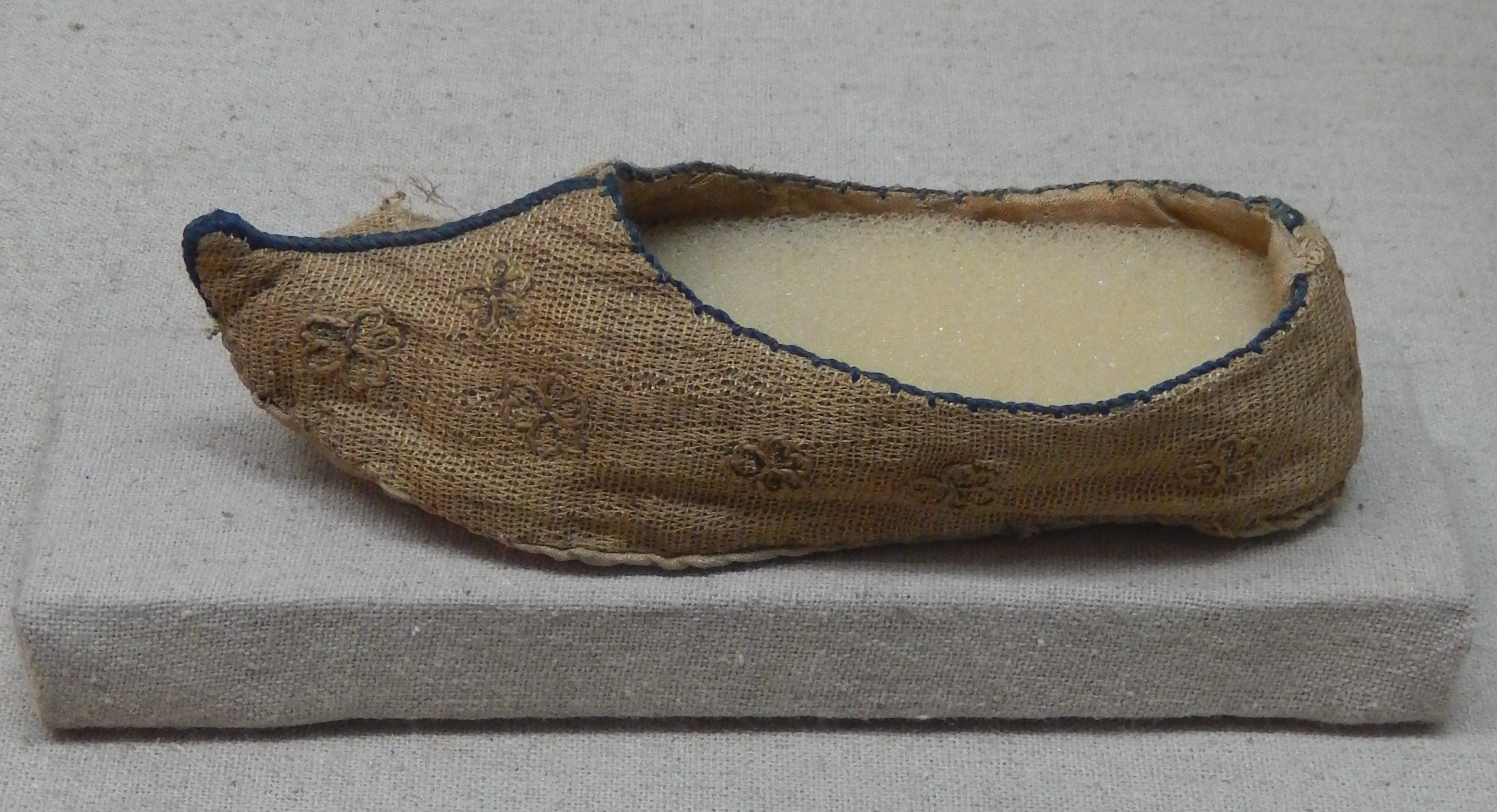
Child's shoes, Liao dynasty.

== See also ==
- Liao dynasty
- Khitan people
- Fashion in the Yuan dynasty
