= Yuanben =

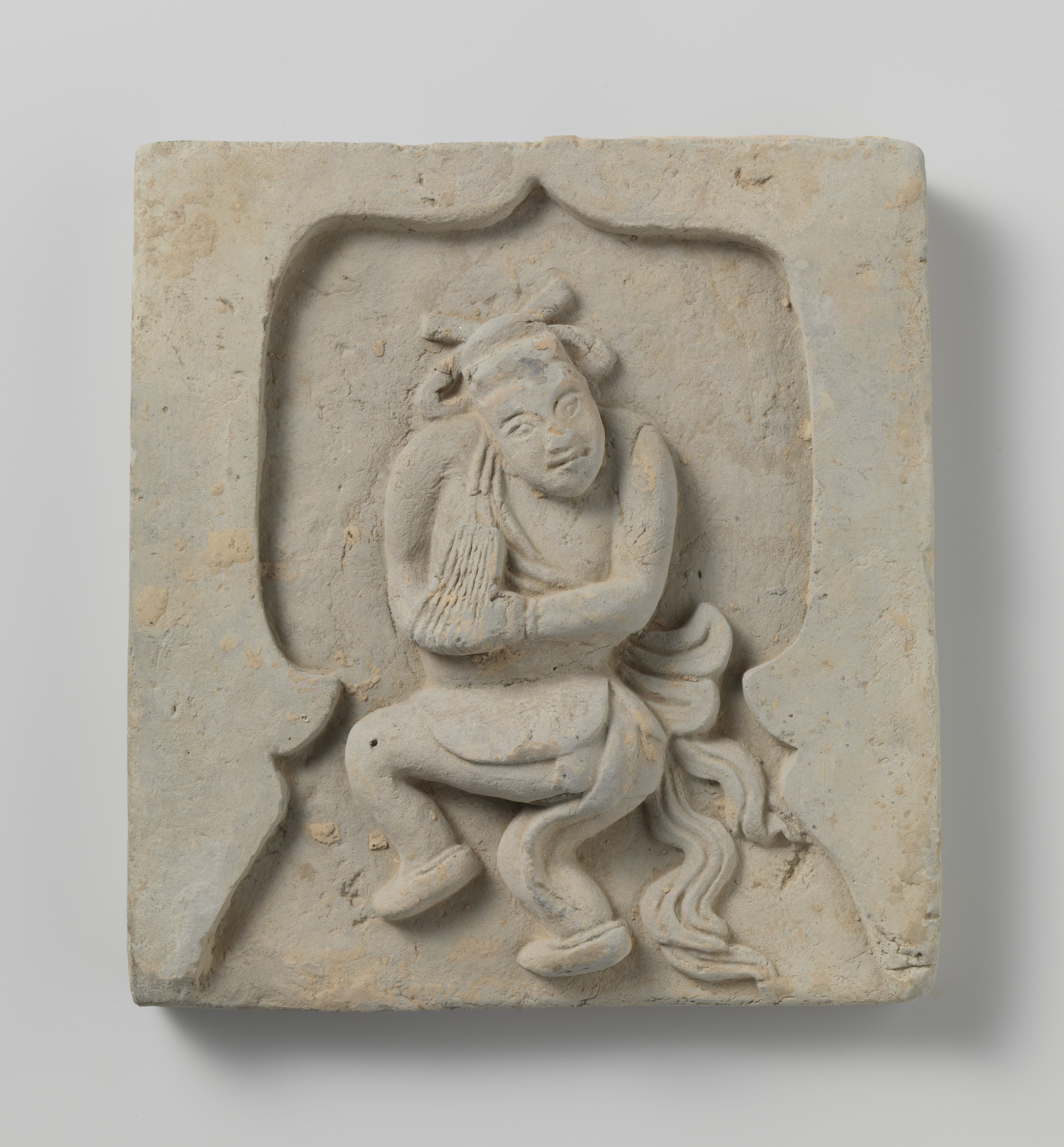
- A tile depicting an actor from the Jin or Yuan Era
- Chinese: 院本
Transcriptions
Standard Mandarin
- Hanyu Pinyin: Yuànběn
- Wade–Giles: Yüan-pên

Yuanben was an early form of Chinese opera which thrived in northern China during the 12th and 13th centuries under the Jin and early Yuan dynasties. Unlike the contemporary nanxi operas, which flourished in East China, no yuanben play has survived. Nevertheless, 691 yuanben titles are listed in Tao Zongyi's c. 1366 Nancun Chuogeng Lu. Yuanben might have been very similar to the zaju under the Southern Song and it eventually evolved into the zaju of the Yuan dynasty.

== Role types ==
There were five role types in yuanben:

- Fujing (副淨), derived from the canjun role type in canjunxi, a clown
- Fumo (副末), derived from the canghu role type in canjunxi, a jester
- Yinxi (引戲), a playleader
- Moni (末泥), an actor-director
- Guzhuang (孤裝), a mandarin
