= Night in paintings (Eastern art) =

Overview of nighttime themes in Asian art

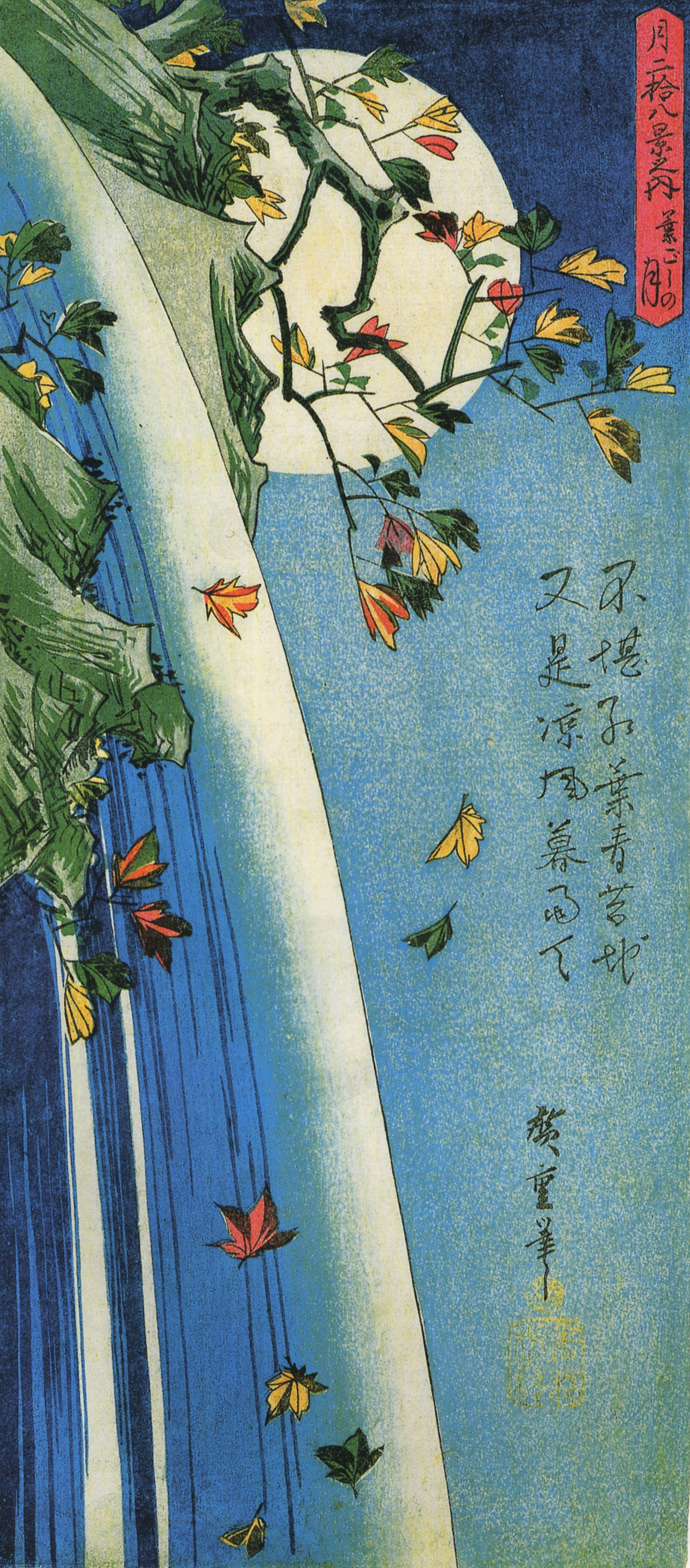
Hiroshige, The moon over a waterfall

The depiction of night in paintings is common in art in Asia. Paintings that feature the night scene as the theme are mostly portraits and landscapes. Some artworks which involve religious or fantasy topics use the quality of dim night light to create mysterious atmospheres. They tend to illustrate the illuminating effect of the light reflection on the subjects under either moonlight or artificial light sources.

== Historical overview ==
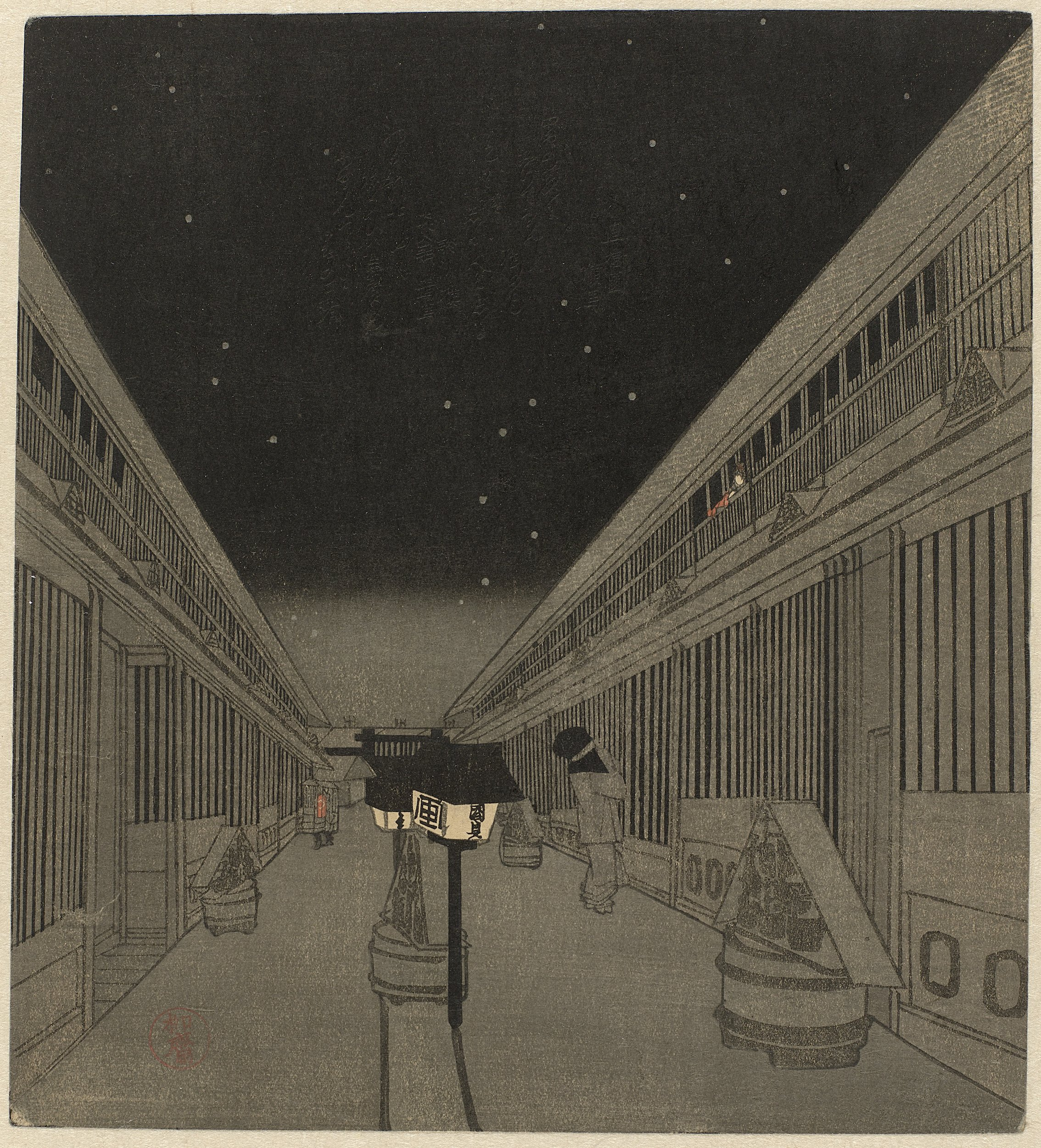
Utagawa Kunisada II, Yoshiwara by night

Early oriental artists created works that focused on design and spiritual interpretation of their subjects rather than realistic, three-dimensional representations. For centuries, eastern night paintings were spiritually and emotionally evocative works with unshaded, two-dimensional imagery. Like the western world, the moon, candles, and stars helped set the nocturnal scene. But there were also items, such as clothing and tree leaves, that might be used in a specific way to express nighttime from an eastern perspective.

The 16th-century Mughal painter Basawan was an early artist who integrated western techniques and perspective into eastern art. When trade opened up between the far east and the west art slowly changed in both sides of the world. For instance, Japanese ukiyo-e prints influenced Parisian artists. And, Jesuit priests, like Matteo Ricci, brought artwork to China that introduced western approaches for perspective and shading. These factors broadened the way in which nighttime was portrayed everywhere.

== Symbolism ==
Black and grey shades often symbolize gloom, fear, mystery, superstitions, evil, death, secret, sorrow. The light source in most religious paintings symbolize hope, guidance or divinity. In fantasy paintings light could symbolize magic.

== By region ==
=== East Asian art ===
==== China ====
Traditional Chinese artists sought to capture the interrelated, vast and multifaceted aspects of nature here are on earth and in the heavens. From the article "The Great Art of China's 'Soundless Poems'", Heaven appears "before us only this bright shining mass; but in its immeasurable extent, the sun, the moon, stars and constellations are suspended in it, and all things are embraced under it." Night scenes, not otherwise distinguishable from daytime in Chinese art, include candles, light emanating from a building, the moon, or lake mists.

Symbolism plays an enduring role in the telling of a story through painting or other Chinese art. For instance, stars and the moon are important both for religious significance and as an illustration of Chinese mythology. Symbols used in art may be grouped into four overarching categories: religious imagery, divine and mortal beings, symbols from nature and inanimate objects. Some examples of symbols include bats which means both good wishes and good luck. The moon, aside from religious and mythical connotations, can also mean a month. The particular way an image is depicted has meaning – like a round eyed-cat means it's a night scene.

Artists use rice paper, silk or wood panels to paint night scenes. Silk has illuminating effect, while wood panels create a dark background.

===== Battle =====
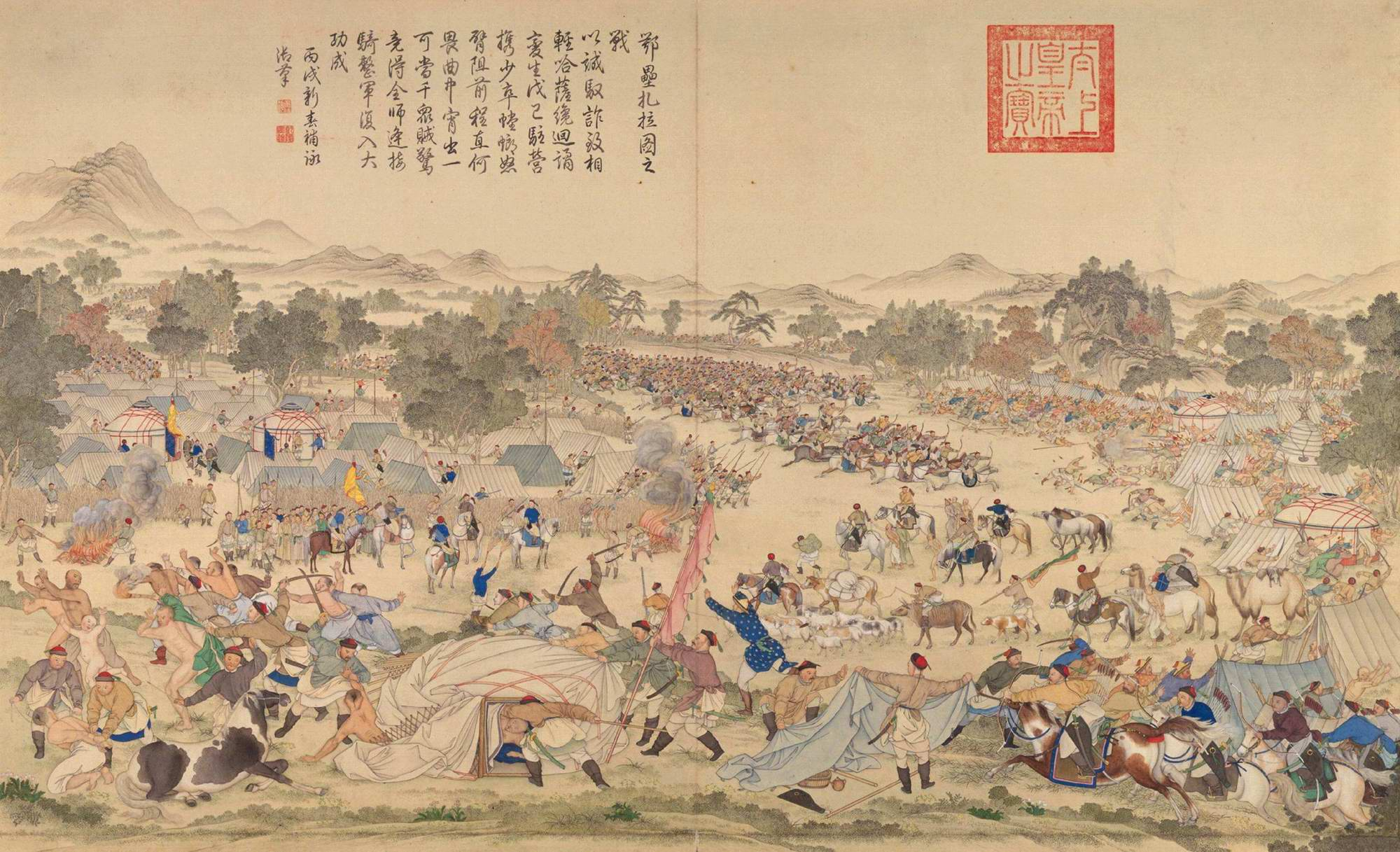
A collaboration between Chinese and European painters, The Battle of Oroi-Jalatu, (China, Qing dynasty), 1756

===== Folklore and literature =====
====== Literature ======
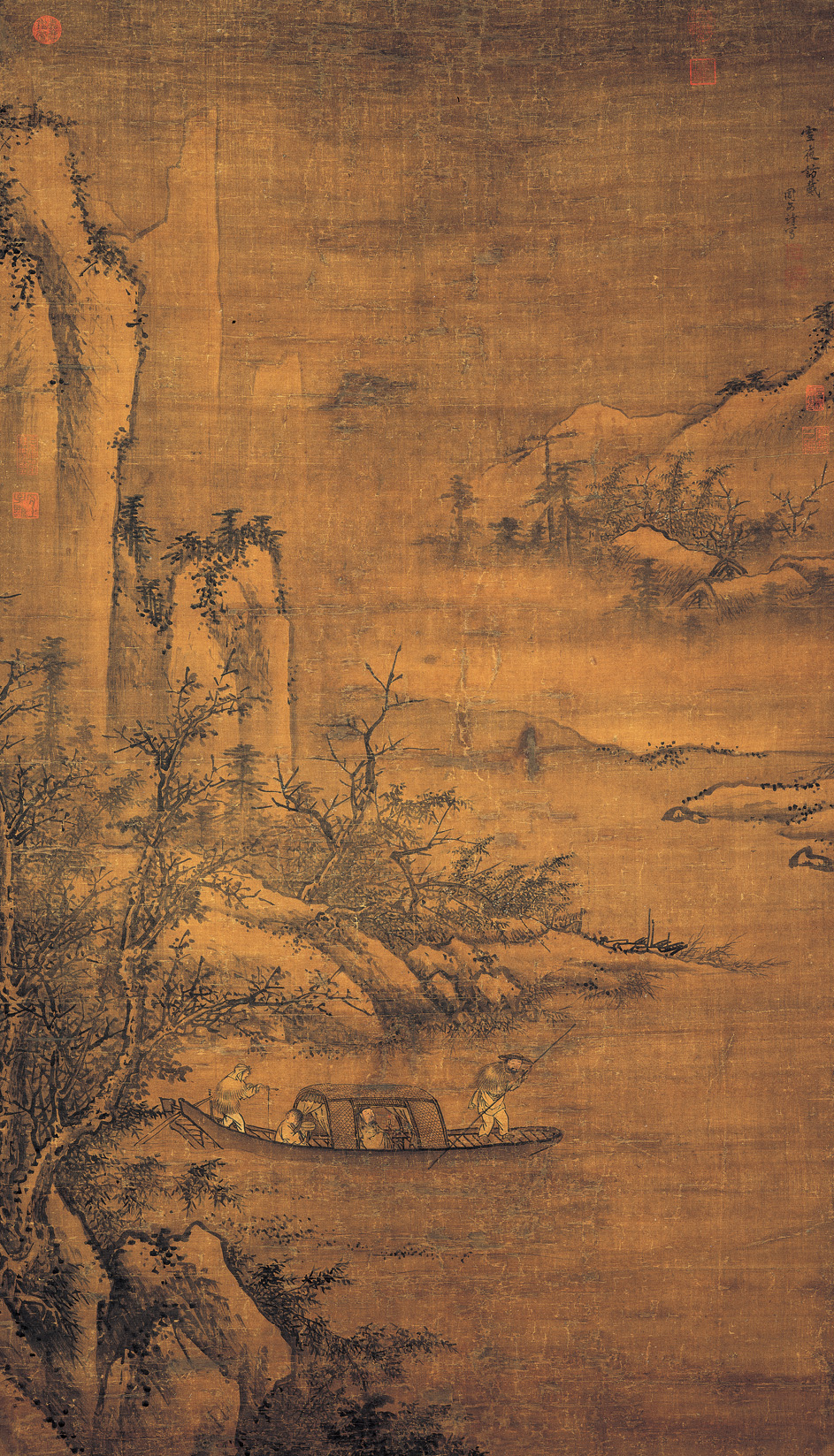
Zhou Wenjing, Visiting Dai Kui on a Snowy Night, 15th century (China, Early Ming dynasty), National Palace Museum

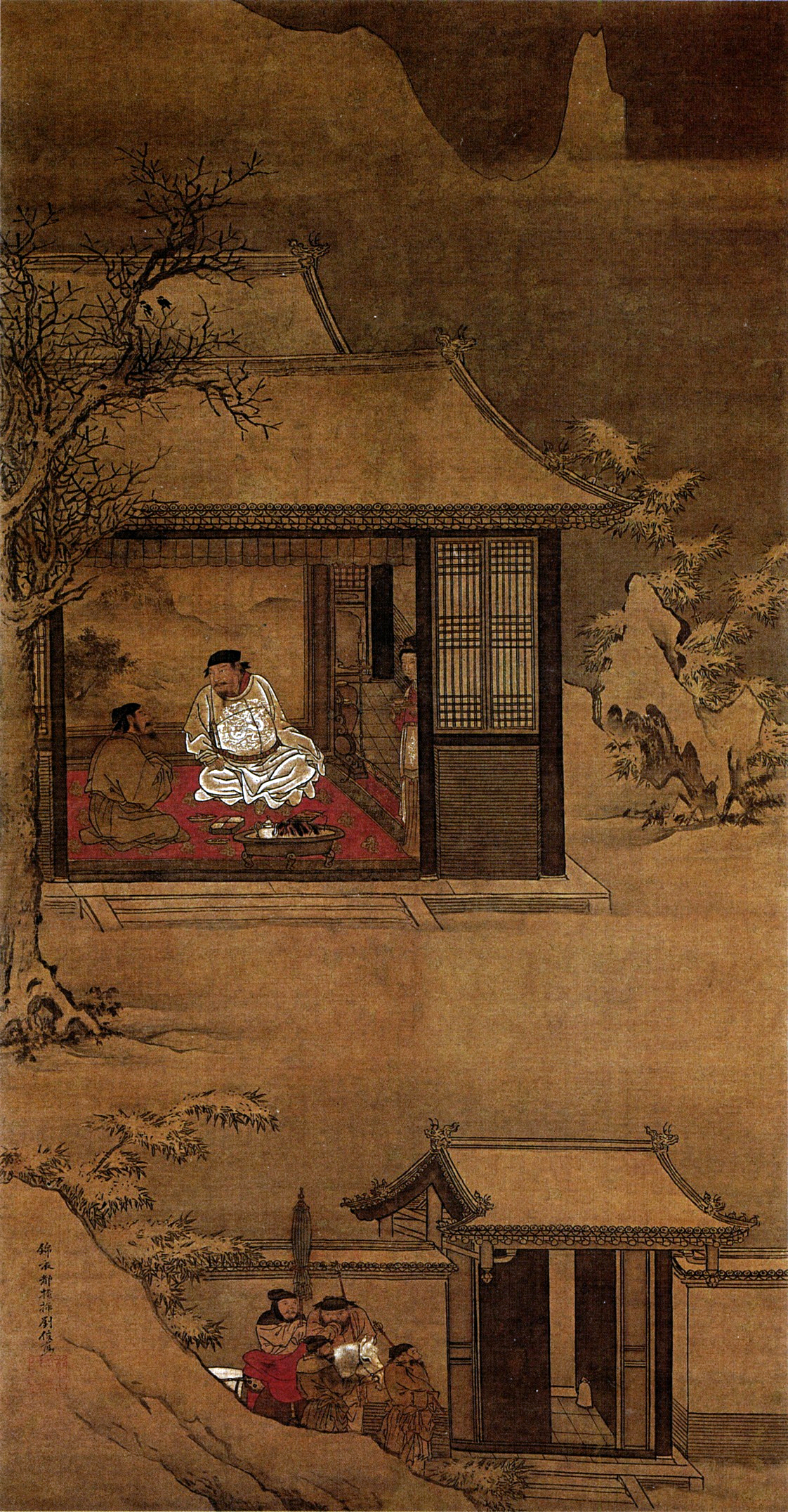
Liu Jun, Visiting Pu on a Snowy Night, 15th century (China, Early Ming dynasty), Palace Museum.

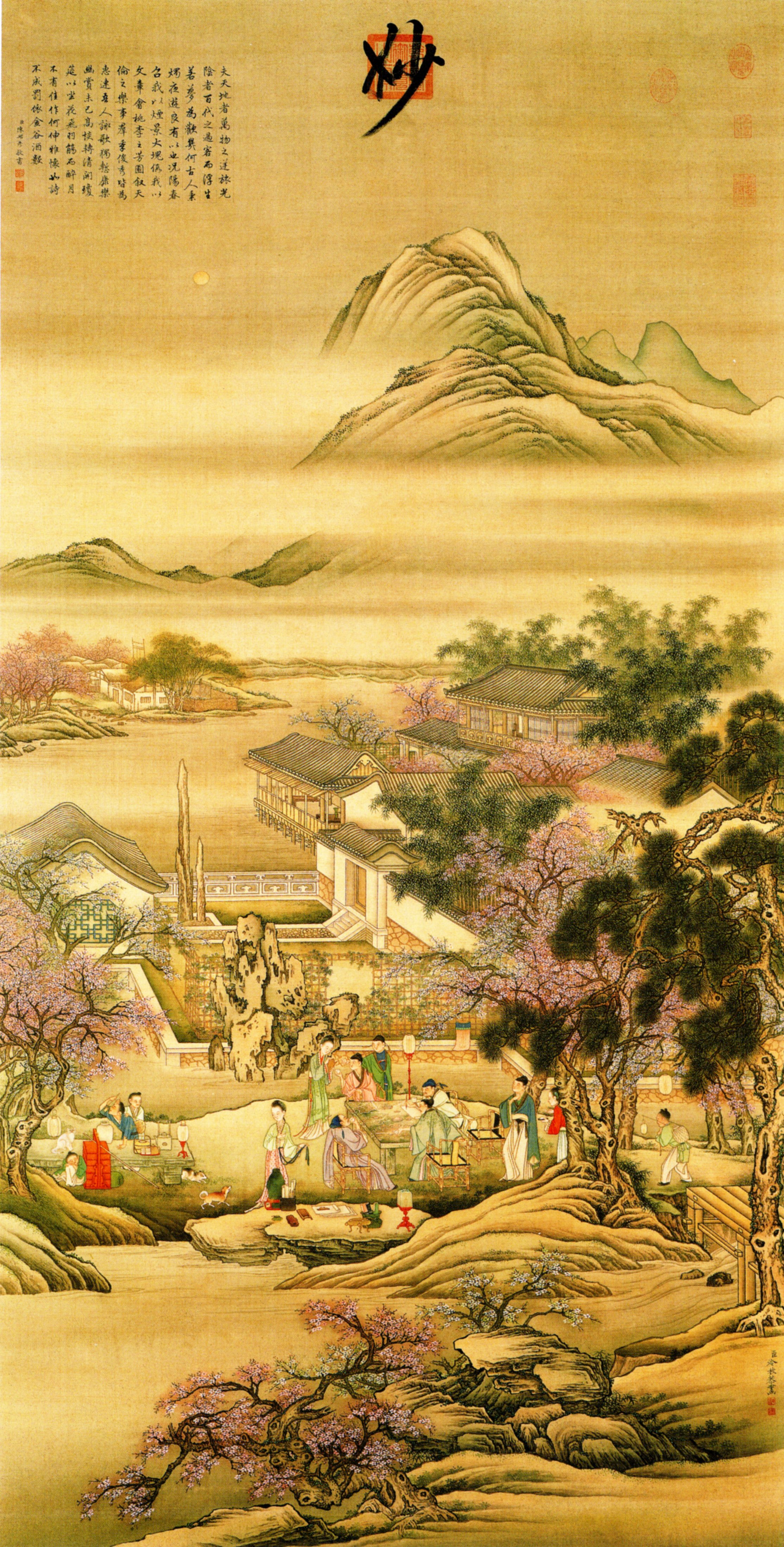
Leng Mei,Spring Evening Banquet, (China, Qing dynasty), 1677–1742, National Palace Museum, Taipei.

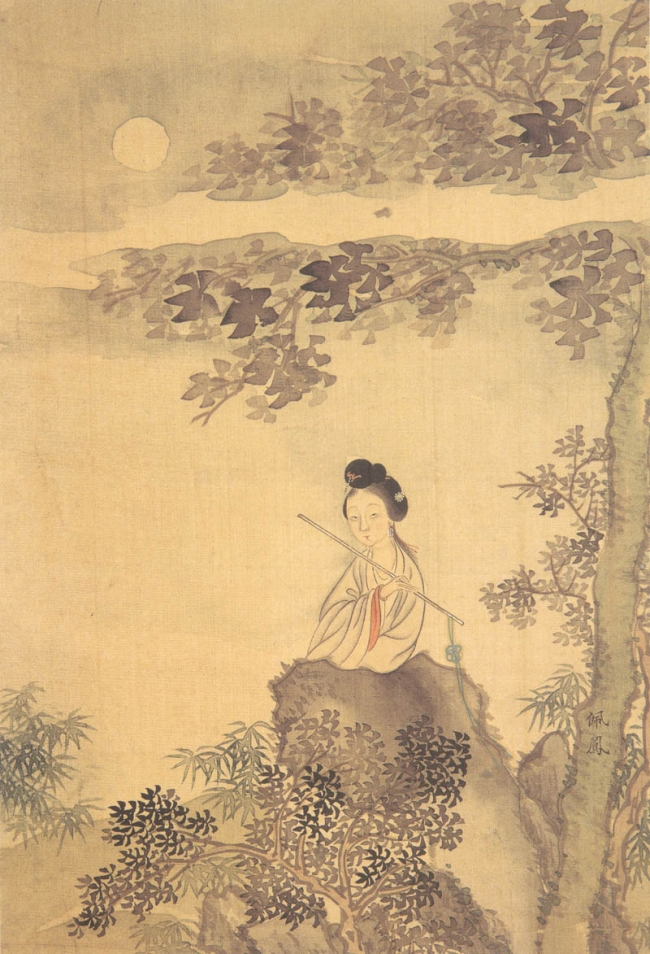
Gai Qi, Scene from 'Dream of the Red Chamber', c. 1816, Qing dynasty

Dream of the Red Chamber and Strange Stories from a Chinese Studio were inspiration for night time paintings.

Almost 500 legendary tales written by Pu Songling are compiled in Strange Stories from a Chinese Studio or Liaozhai Zhiyi. The tales, inspired by oral storytelling, include strong mythical characters like ghosts, immortals, beasts and foxes. They also offer commentary about people, particularly the privileged and court officials, whose human frailties may result in unfair, unjust and other unfavorable treatment to others. He wrote with vivid imagery about the music of heaven, the inability of the light produced by a fire-fly to illuminate the demons of the night, red rings in the sky that shear the heads off of men, and the six conditions of existence: men, sinners, angels, demons, beasts and devils. Nighttime is a symbol for people's inability to understand the world around them. And the supernatural beings are meant to be a mirror to examine the nature of man. From a preface by T'ang Meng Lai to the book, Lai states that the book should prompt the readers to reflect upon the following: "We marvel at devils and foxes: we do not marvel at man. But who is it that causes a man to move and to speak?" One collection of the illustrated stories is at the National Museum of China.

====== Ghosts and hell ======
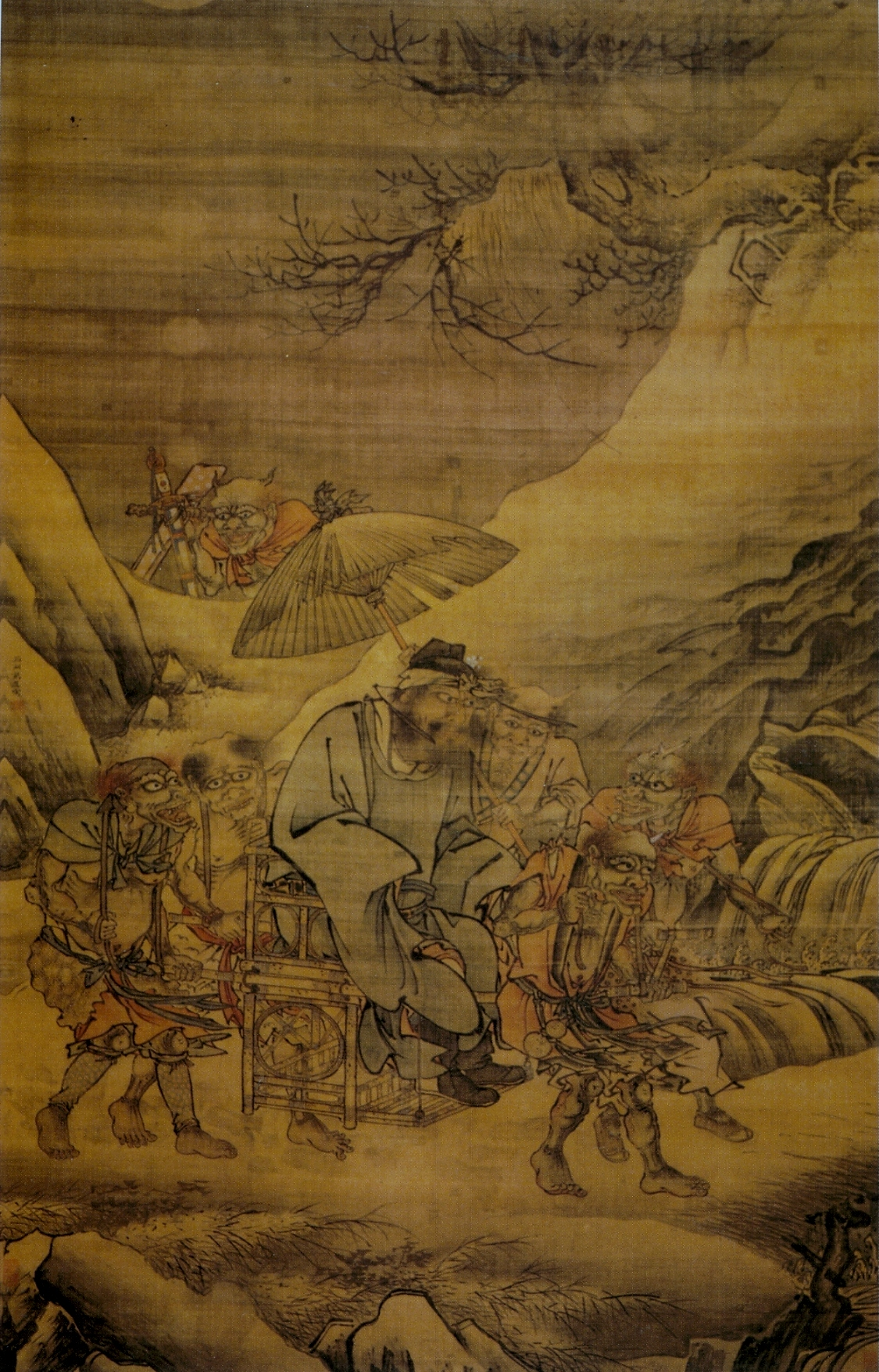
Dai Jin, The Night Excursion of Zhong Kui, 15th century, Palace Museum, Beijing.

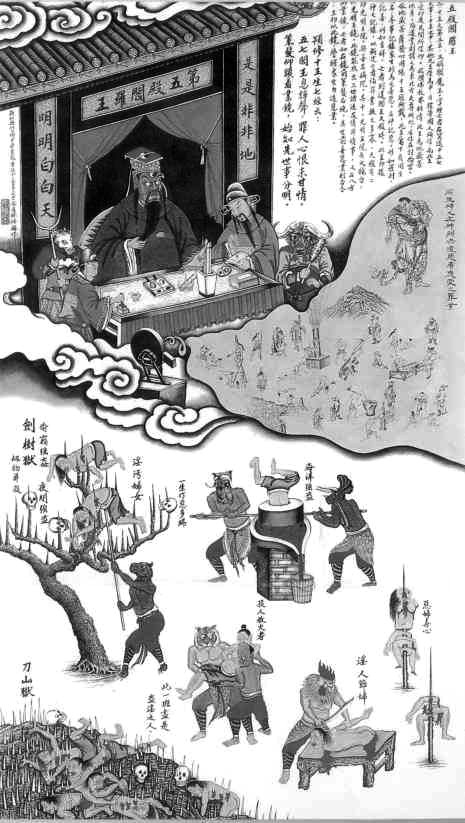
Yanluo, judge of Hell, inspired by the Hindu deity Yama

Many of the Chinese ghost beliefs have been accepted by neighboring cultures, notably Japan and south-east Asia. Ghost beliefs are closely associated with the traditional Chinese religion based on ancestor worship, many of which were incorporated in Taoism. Later beliefs were influenced by Buddhism, and in turn influenced and created uniquely Chinese Buddhist beliefs.

Zhong Kui is a mythological figure, generally a vanquisher of ghosts and evil beings, and reputedly able to command 80,000 demons. Another mythological figure is Yan luo, the judge of Hell.

===== Mood setting =====
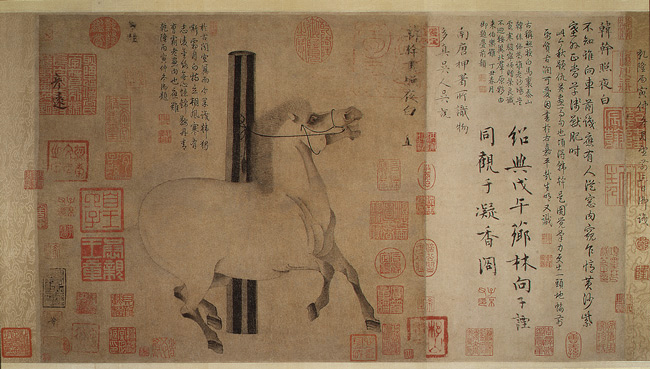
Han Gan, Night-Shining White Horse, ca. 750, Metropolitan Museum of Art

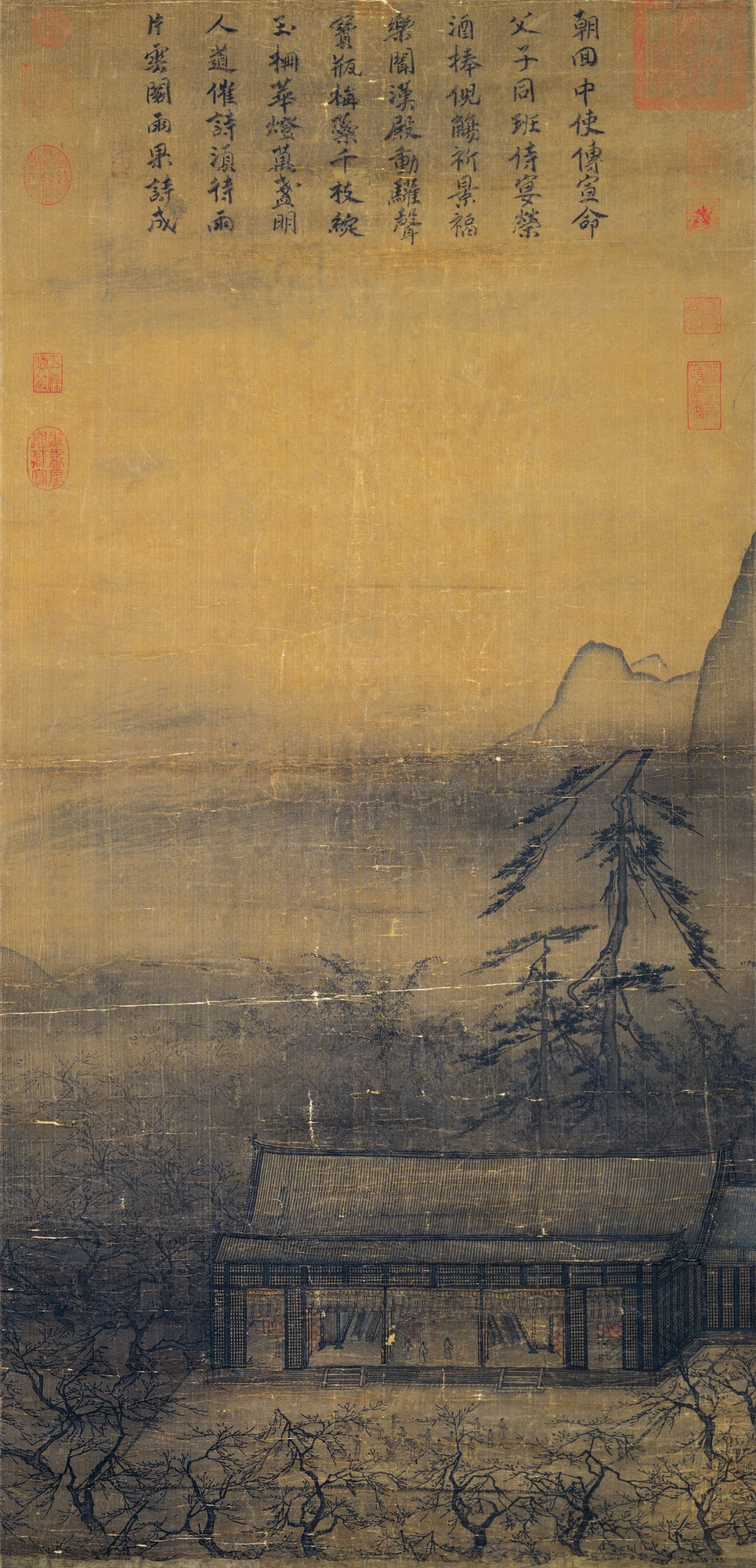
Ma Yuan, Banquet by Lantern Light, circa 1200 (China, Song dynasty), National Palace Museum, Taipei.

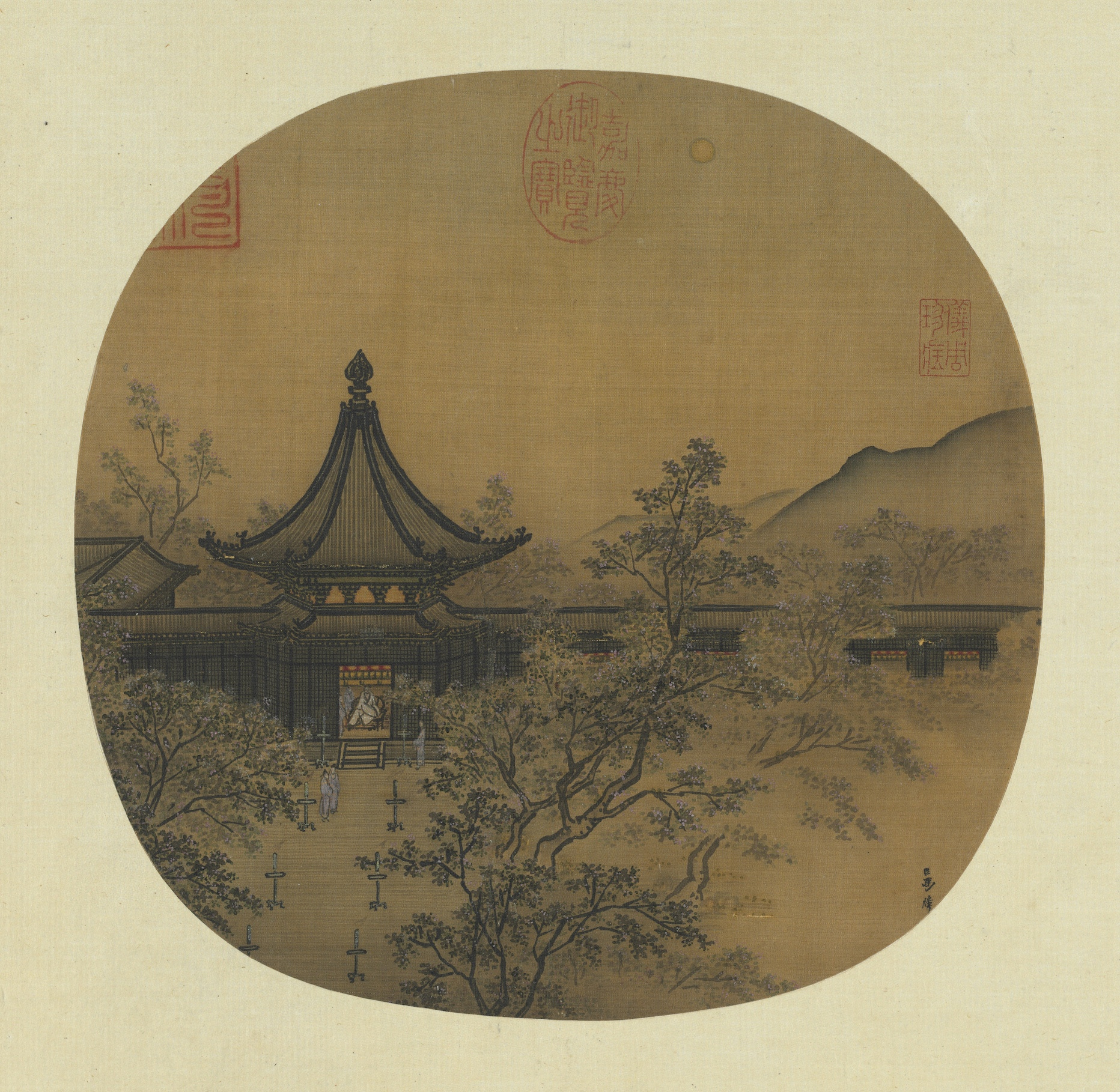
Ma Lin, Waiting for Guests by Lamplight, circa 1250 (China, Song dynasty)

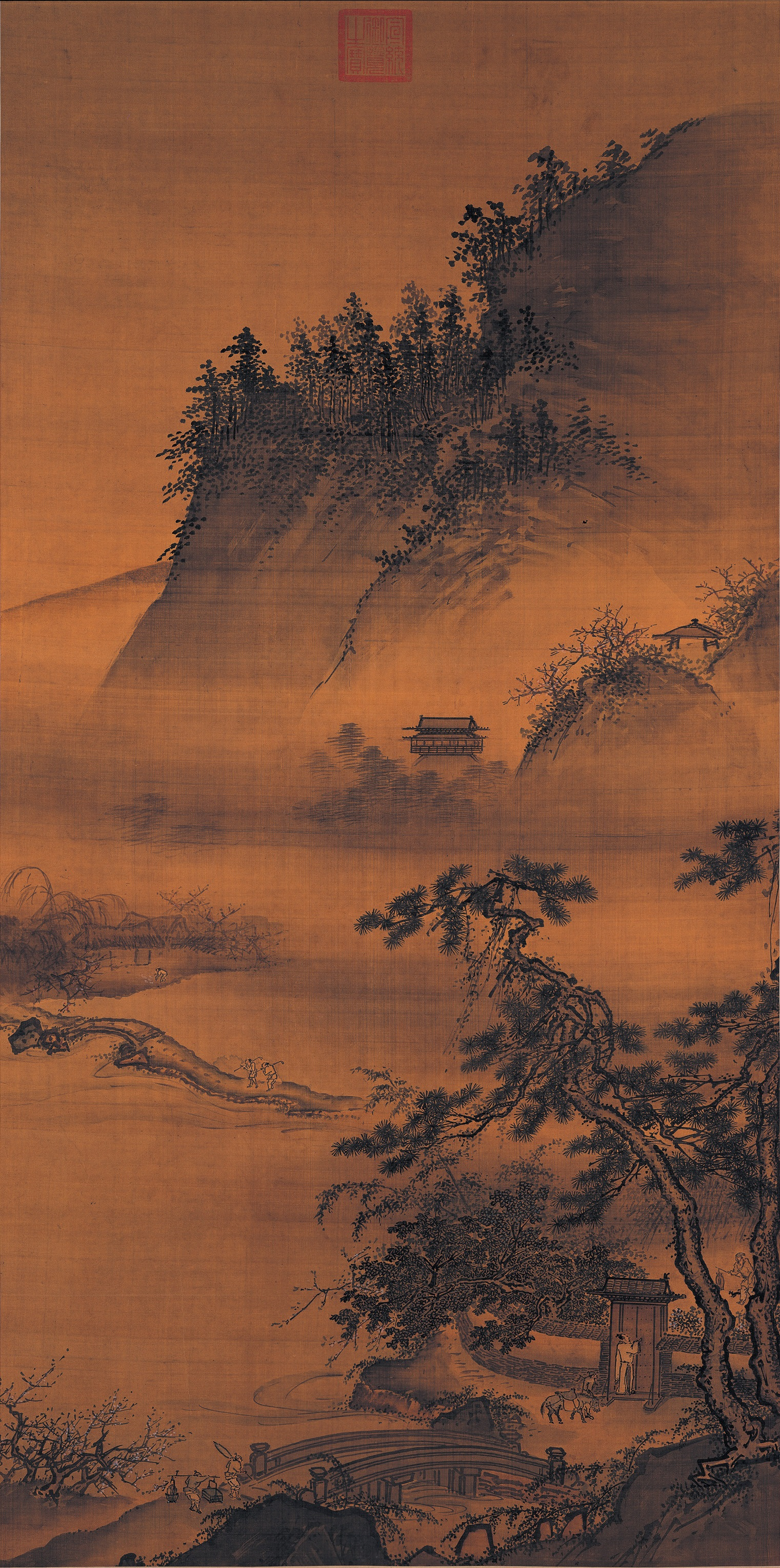
Dai Jin, Returning Late from a Spring Outing, 15th century, (China, Early Ming dynasty), National Palace Museum (Note: Likely made in the 15th century. Dai Jin was born in 1388, which would have made him twelve at the turn of the century.)

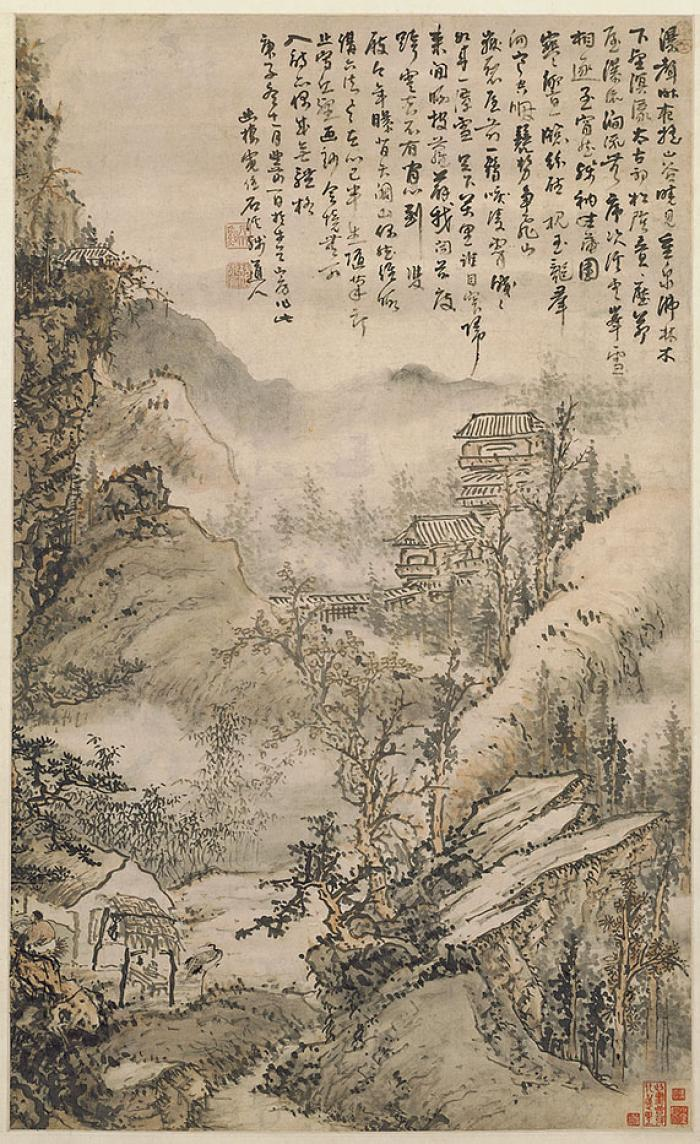
Kun Can, Landscape after Night Rain Shower, (China, Qing dynasty), 1660, Palace Museum, Beijing.

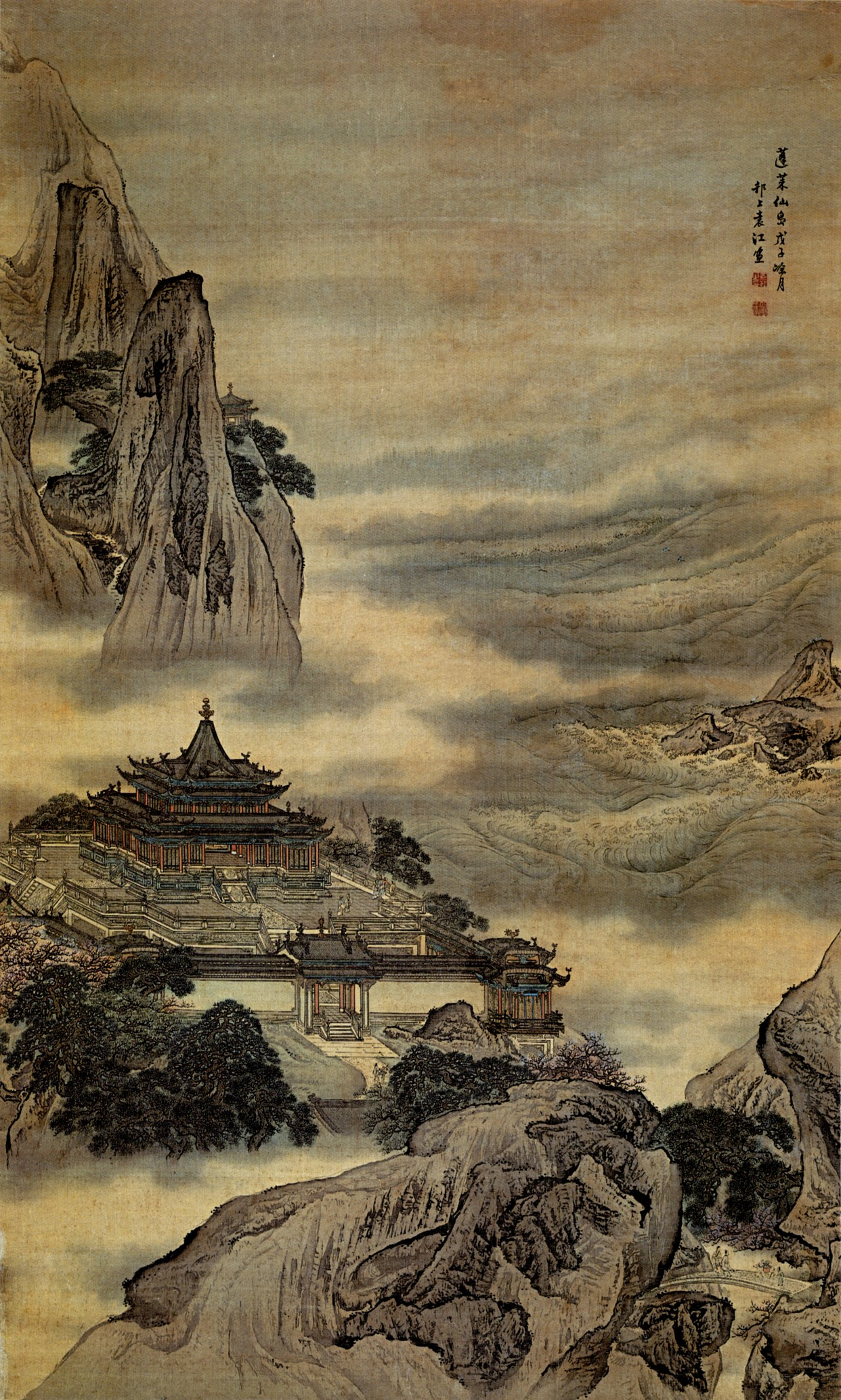
Yuan Jiang, Penglai Island, 1708, Palace Museum

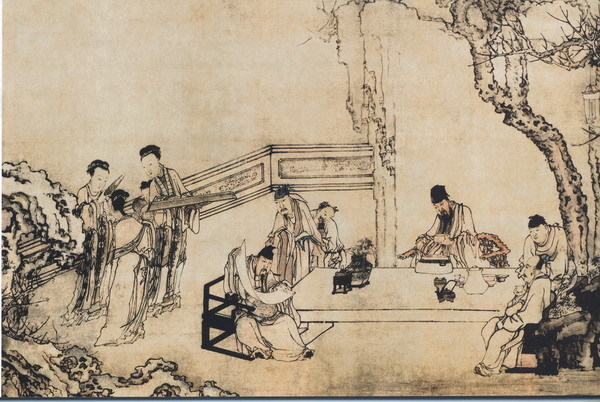
Huang Shen, A Night Banquet at Peach and Plum Garden in Spring, (China, Qing dynasty), before 1772

Chinese artists focus on the spiritual qualities of the painting and on the ability of the artist to reveal the inner harmony of man and nature, as perceived according to Taoist and Buddhist concepts. Artists, like Su Shi used their skills in calligraphy (the art of beautiful writing) to make ink paintings that expressed ideas based upon the philosophies of Chinese dynasties and Confucius. Their works also express their feelings and the inner spirit of their subject.

Within a night scene, homesickness is expressed by flying birds looking to find a place to rest for the night

====== Han Gan, Night-Shining White Horse ======
Han Gan created Night-Shining White Horse to dramatically capture the spirit of the imperial stallion, a symbol of China's powerfulness using only ink and paper. The stark image, without color or shading, exposes the true essence of the scene.

====== Ma Lin, Waiting for Guests by Lamplight ======
Waiting for Guests by Lamplight was painted in the Song dynasty by Ma Lin, son of famous Chinese painter Ma Yuan. (Note: Ma Lin was from a famous family of painters, out of which, for at least 150 years, one painter in each generation received official appointment to the Imperial Painting Academy.) Using shi i (English: poetic ideas) (Note: Shi i, poetry inspired painting, is similar in outcome to the three perfections practice.), Ma Lin painted the evening scene based upon a poem by Su Shi. In it, a man sits in the door of a pavilion during a full moon. A gentle mood is set by soft, low-lying fog before the mountains and crabapple trees. Leading up to the building is a line of candles specially placed near the blossoming crab apple trees – to "illuminate their beauty".

The poem by 11th century poet Su Shi that inspired Ma Lin is:

My fear is that in the depth of night,

The flowers will fall asleep and depart. So I light the tall candles,

To illuminate their beauty.

===== Moon =====
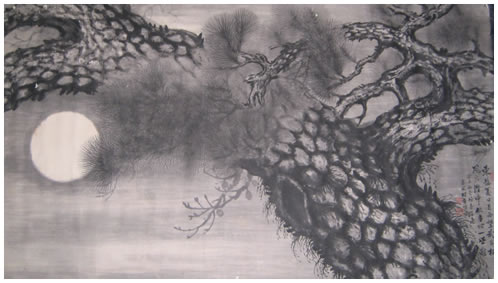
Ong Schan Tchow, Pine In Moonlight (China)

In Chinese night paintings, the moon often symbolizes loneliness of the painting's character. It also sets the mood for a romantic setting. Chinese paintings also depict mythological characters who symbolize moonlight activity, such as Yue-Laou, the "old man of the moonlight" and Chang'e, the Chinese goddess of the moon.

====== Chang'e, goddess of the moon ======
The Goddess Chang'e in the Lunar Palace depicts Chang'e, the Chinese goddess of the moon from Chinese mythology. (Note: From Chinese legends, Chang'e was the wife of a hunter named Yi. She drank a potion intended for her husband that made her immortal. She then flew to the moon, afraid that her husband would be angry with her, where she lives in a moon palace.) The late Ming dynasty fan painting shows her outside the Palace of Boundless Cold. Chang'e Flying to the Moon is a contemporary depiction of the goddess.

===== Political statement =====
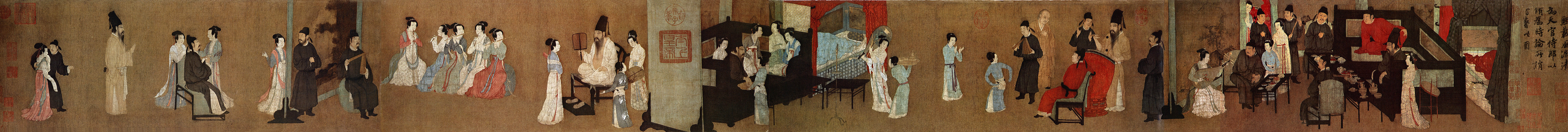
Gu Hongzhong, Night Revels of Han Xizai, (China, Five Dynasties and Ten Kingdoms), 10th century

Night Revels of Han Xizai was painted by Gu Hongzhong during the Five Dynasties and Ten Kingdoms period when dynasties replaced one another at an alarming rate. Fives vignettes are told about a party that Han Xizai, a minister of Li Yu, hosts. In the first scene (viewed from right to left), Han listens to the pipa with his guests. Then, he watches dancers, takes a rest, plays string instruments, and finally sees guests off. It is believed that this painting was made in response to a request by emperor Li Yu to Gu, following Han's declination of an offer to be prime minister. One interpretation is that the painting was a way of chastising Han for having a carefree nightlife rather than accepting greater political responsibility.

==== Japan ====
While paintings are generally a snapshot of a moment in time, the Japanese iji dôzu (English: "different time, same illustration") technique is used to is illustrate activities that occur in different periods of time. A Long Tale for an Autumn Night uses that technique through a progression of time and activities over one night. (Note: This is similar in concept to Paolo Uccello's triple-painting set of the Battle of San Romano that begins in dawn and ends tragically in the dead of night.) During the Autumn night a Buddhist monk and his lover experience a fearful night of a demon in initially disguised as a man, a battle, and threat of suicide – all the more sinister by the gloom of night.

===== Battle =====
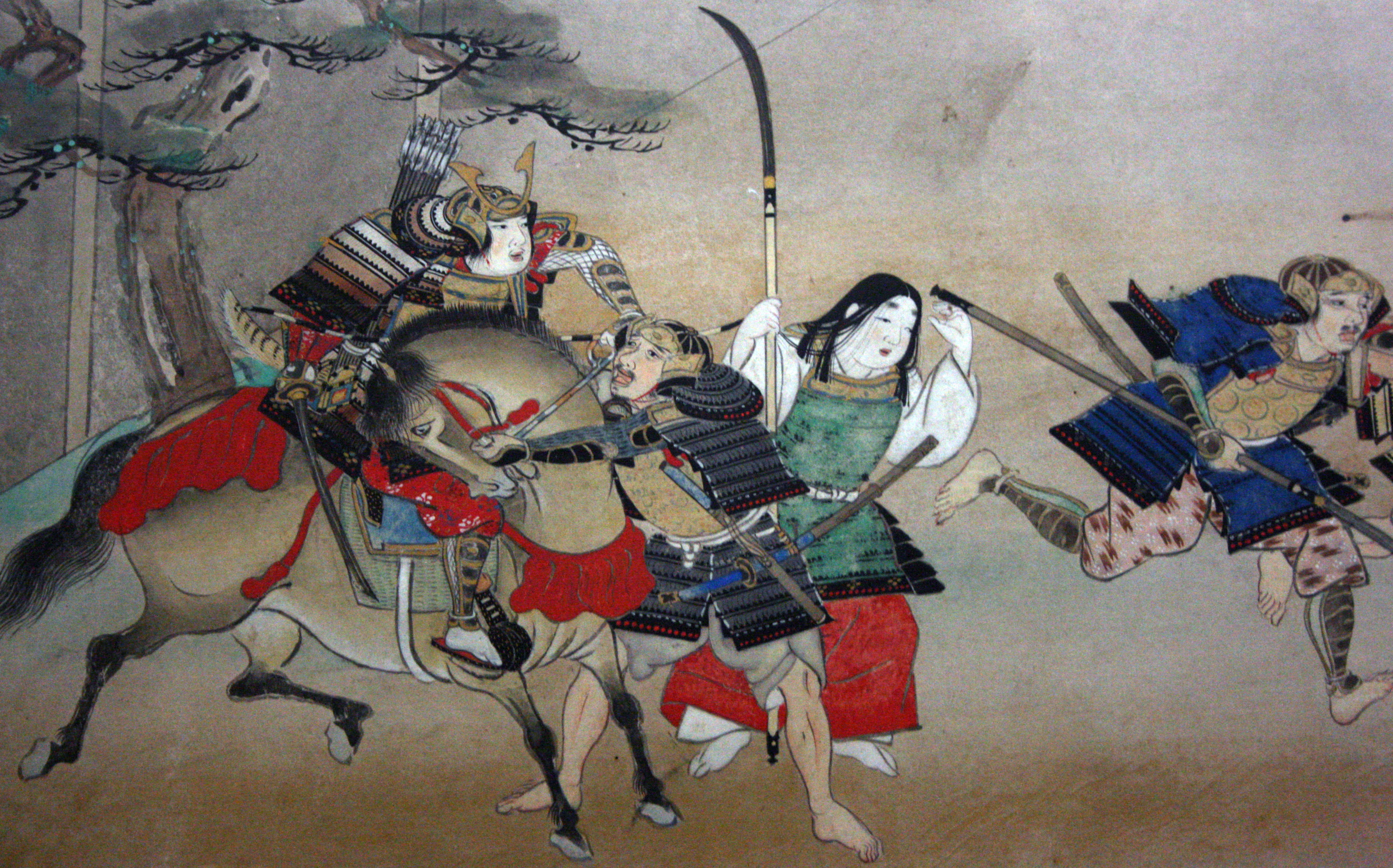
Artist unknown, Illustrated Story of Night Attack on Yoshitune's Residence At Horikawa, 16th century (Japan)

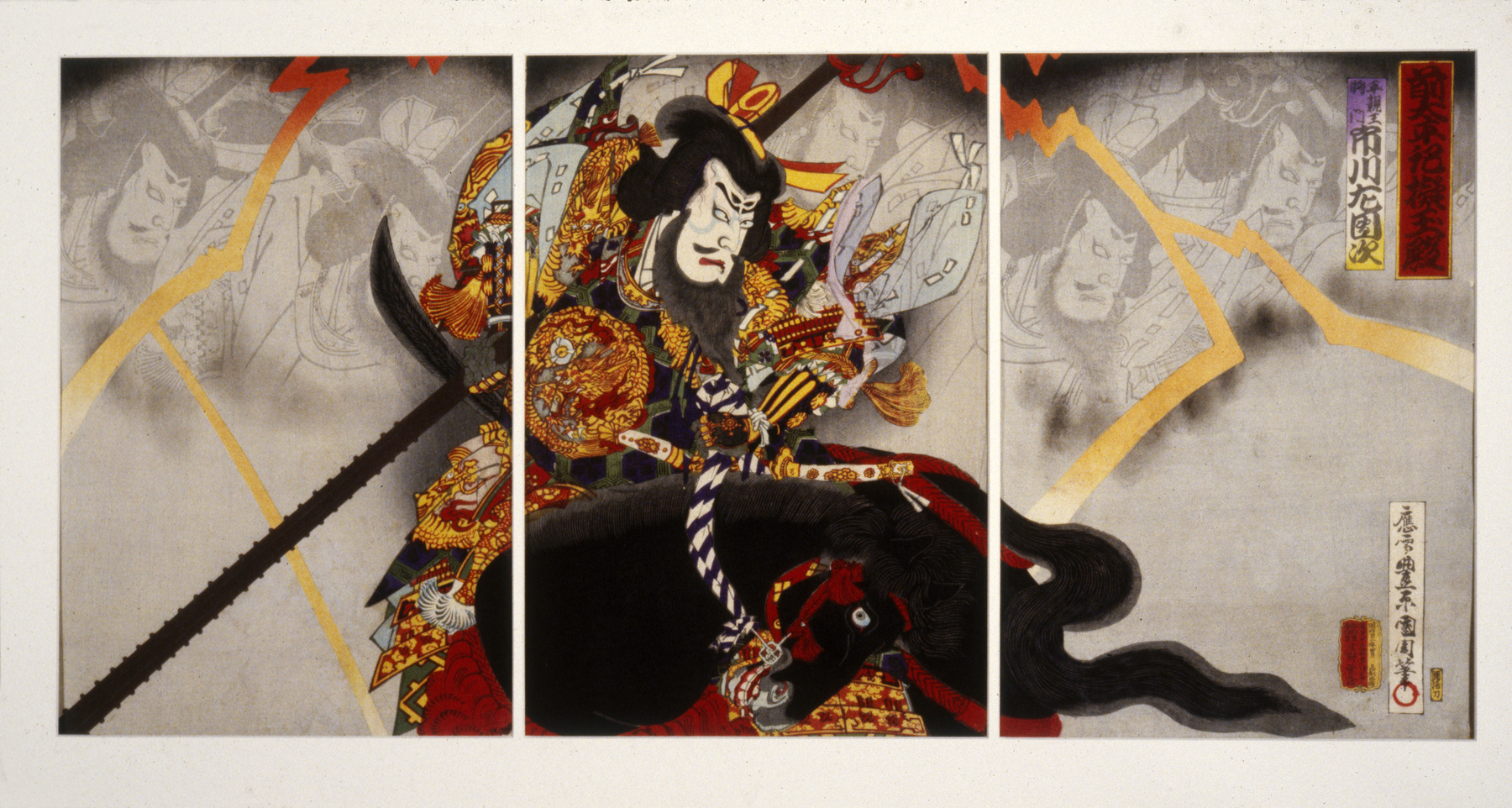
Toyohara Kunichika, Sen Taiheiki gigokuden, 1890, Walters Art Museum

===== Folklore and literature =====
====== Ghosts and witches ======
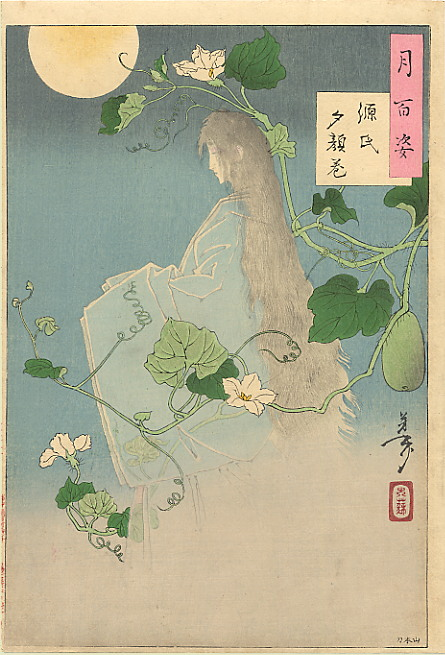
Tsukioka Yoshitoshi, The Ghost of Genji's Love based upon the book The Tale of Genji, 1886

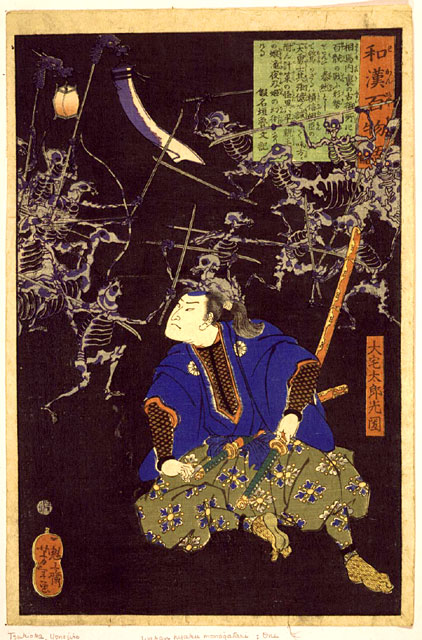
Tsukioka Yoshitoshi, Ōya Tarō Mitsukuni from the series One Hundred (Ghost) Stories from China and Japan (Wakan hyaku monogatari), 1865.

====== Demons and hell ======
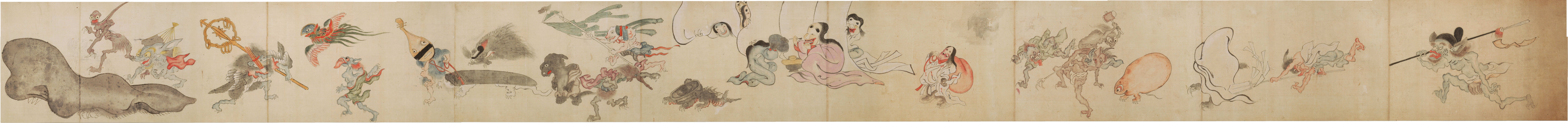
Hyakki Yagyō, Night Parade With One Hundred Demons scroll, Edo period, Japan, Metropolitan Museum of Art
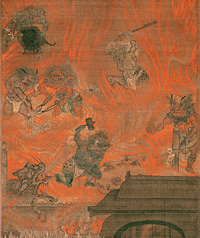
Artist unknown, Avici hell, 13th century (Japanese), Tokyo National Museum

====== One Hundred Aspects of the Moon ======
In the 19th century Tsukioka Yoshitoshi made a series of 100 ukiyo-e, Japanese wood block prints, called One Hundred Aspects of the Moon that introduced Japanese and Chinese folklore during a period of increasing western presence. The works captured "a moment in time and held suspended by a poetic dialogue with the moon." The moon symbolized different meanings depending upon whether it was a full moon or not. The moon's "waxing and waning", also used as the basis of the Japanese lunar calendar, could illustrate what time of the month an event occurred and ascribe a manner in which it was to be interpreted, such as the character's loneliness. (Note: Yoshitoshi's death poem was: "Holding back the night, With its increasing brilliance, The summer moon.)

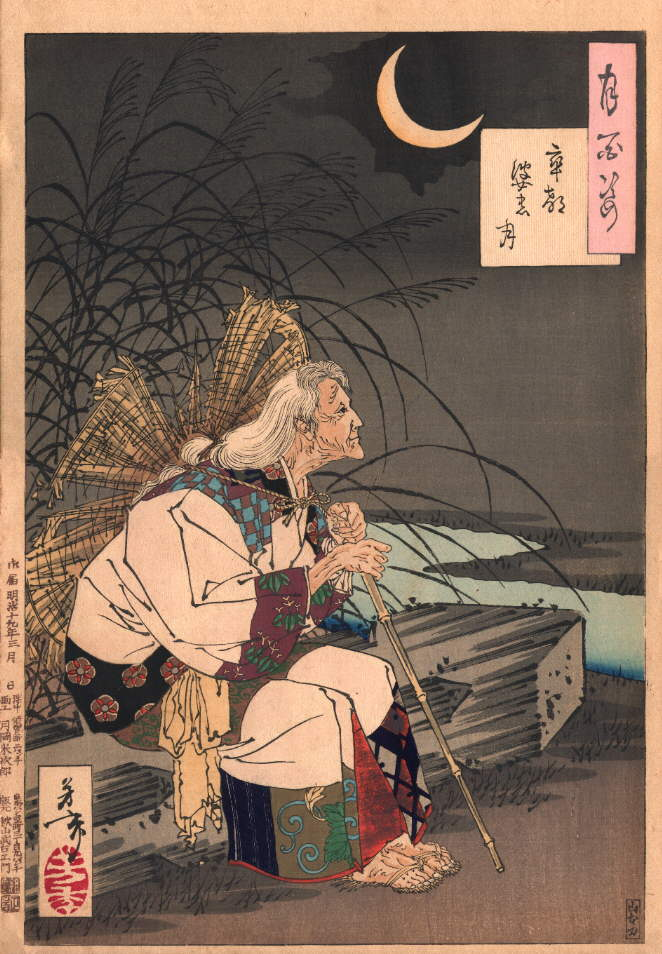
Tsukioka Yoshitoshi, Gravemarker Moon, 100 Aspects of the Moon #25, 3rd month of 1886

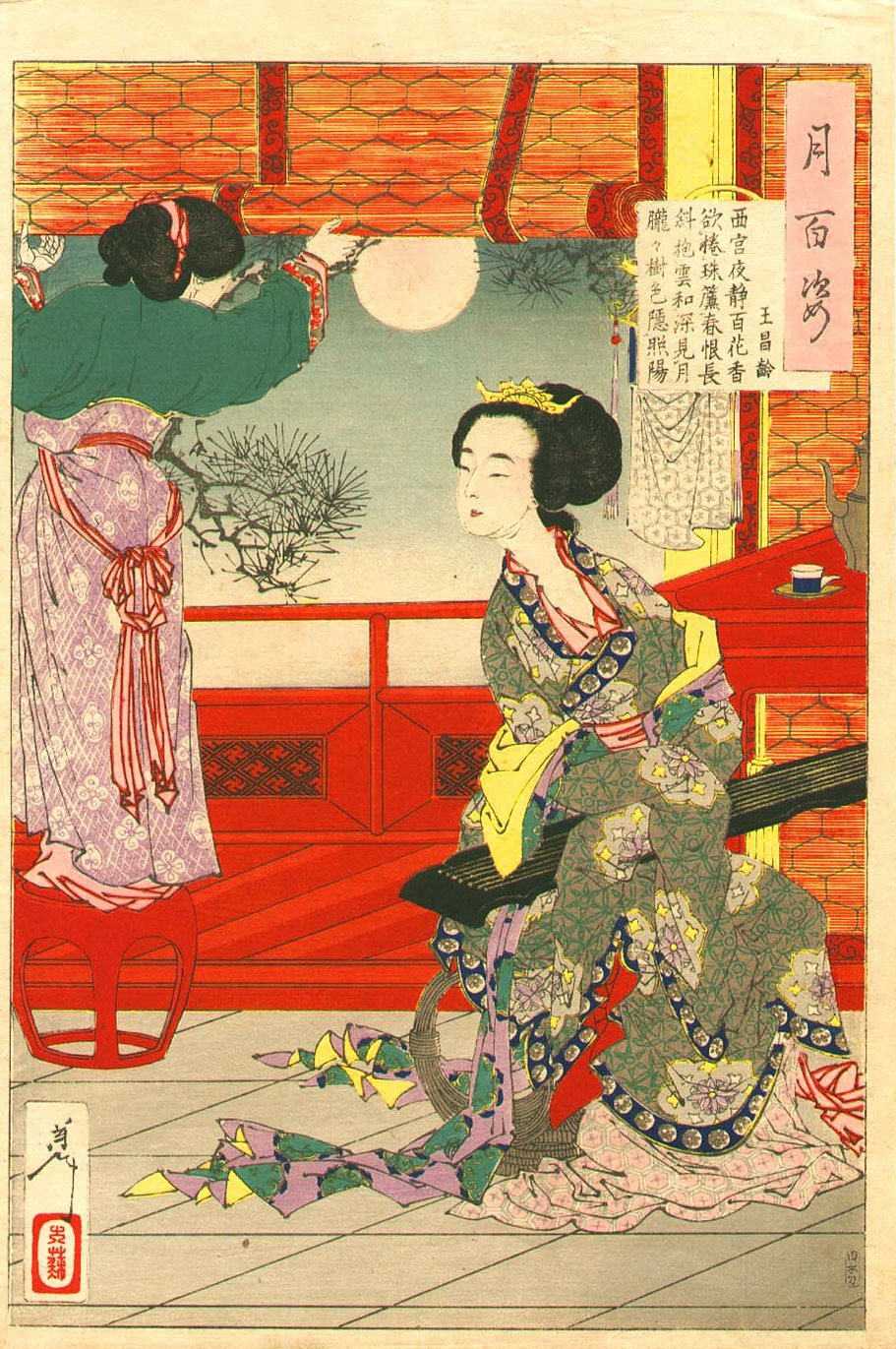
Tsukioka Yoshitoshi, Wang Changling, 100 Aspects of the Moon #54, 1887

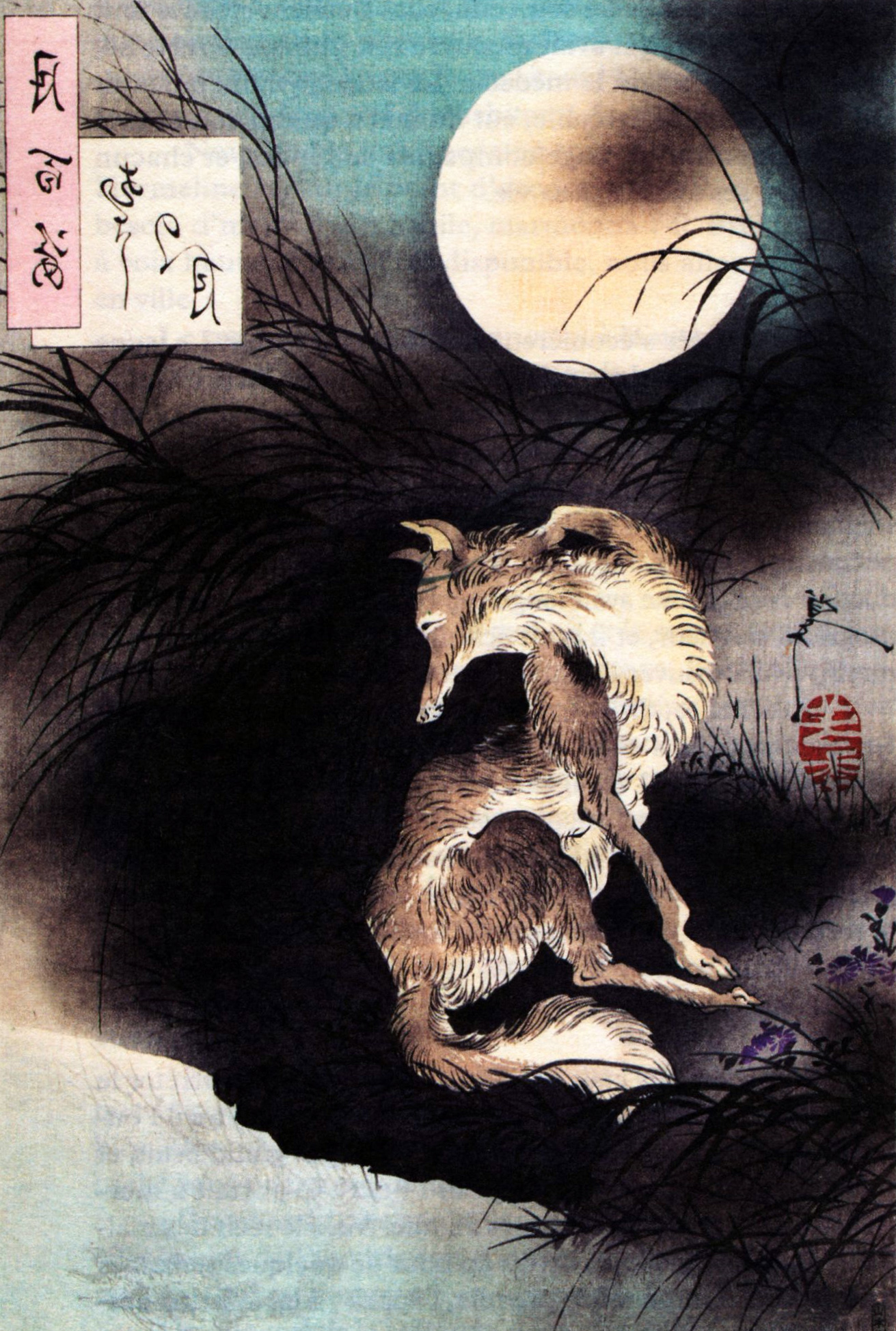
Tsukioka Yoshitoshi, Full Moon in Mushasi, 100 Aspects of the Moon, 1890

In Gravemarker Moon, the famous poet Ono no Komachi meditates on the arrogance and heartlessness she displayed to her suitors as a young beauty.

Wang Changling is the name of the poet who wrote: "The night is still and a hundred flowers are fragrant in the western palace. She orders the screen to be rolled up, regretting the passing of spring with the Yunhe across her lap. She gazes at the moon, the colors of the trees are hazy in the indistinct moonlight."

====== Tale of Genji ======
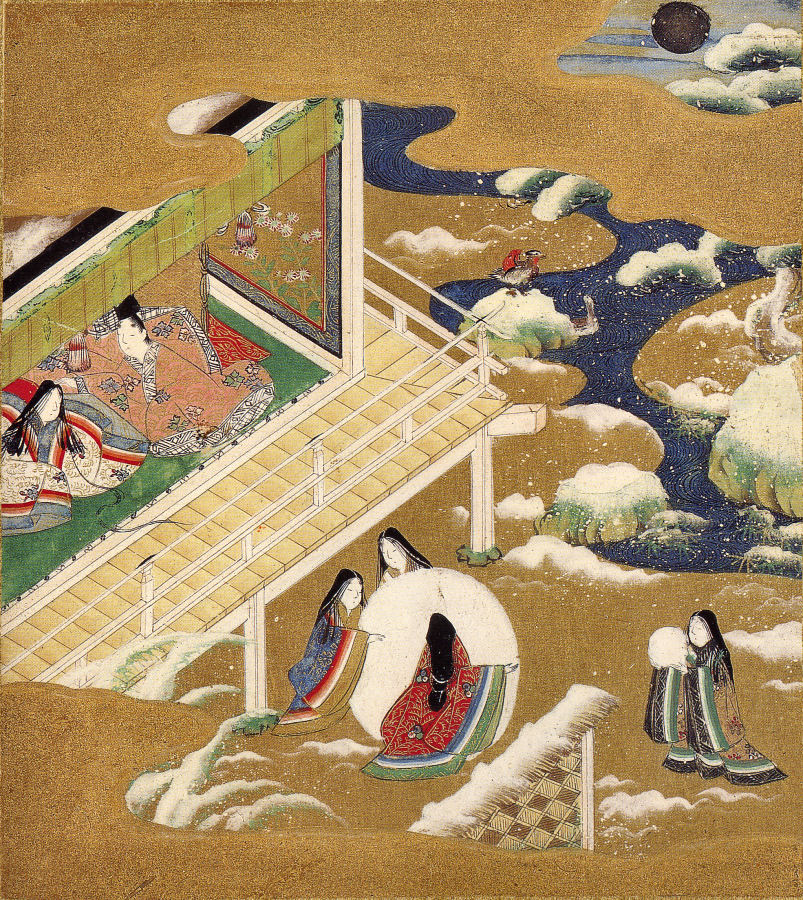
Tosa Mitsuoki, (Note: The illustration about Asagao (chapter 20) is traditionally credited to Tosa Mitsuoki (1617–1691)) Illustration of the Tale of Genji, late 17th century

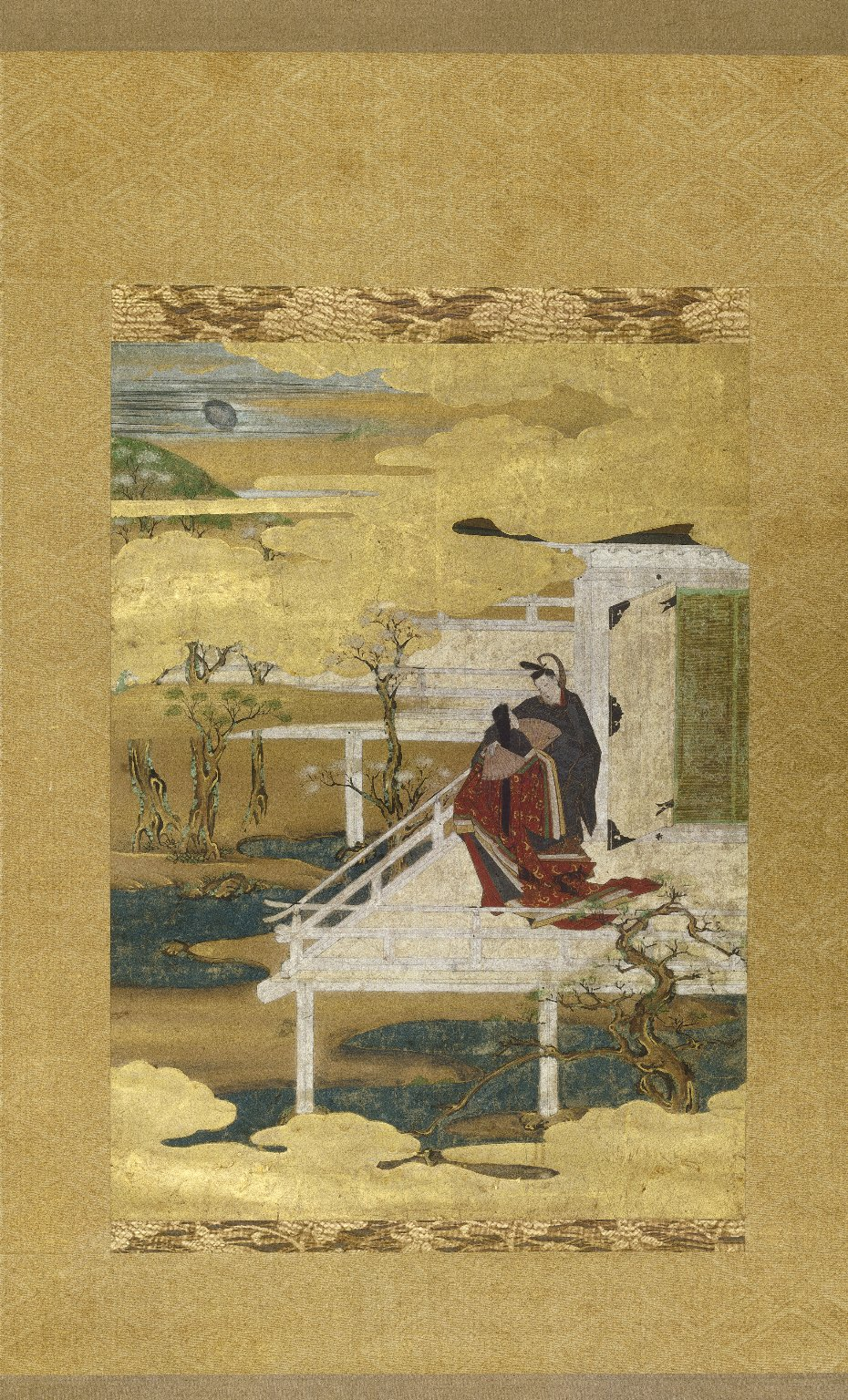
Scene from the Tale of Genji, 16th century, Brooklyn Museum

Tale of Genji also included Tale of Genji's love, which has an illustration.

===== Landscapes =====
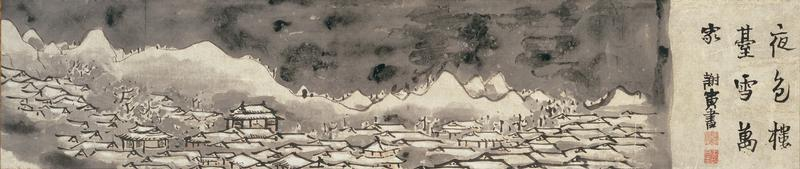
Yosa Buson, Snowclad houses in the night, 1778 (Japan), Miho Museum of Art
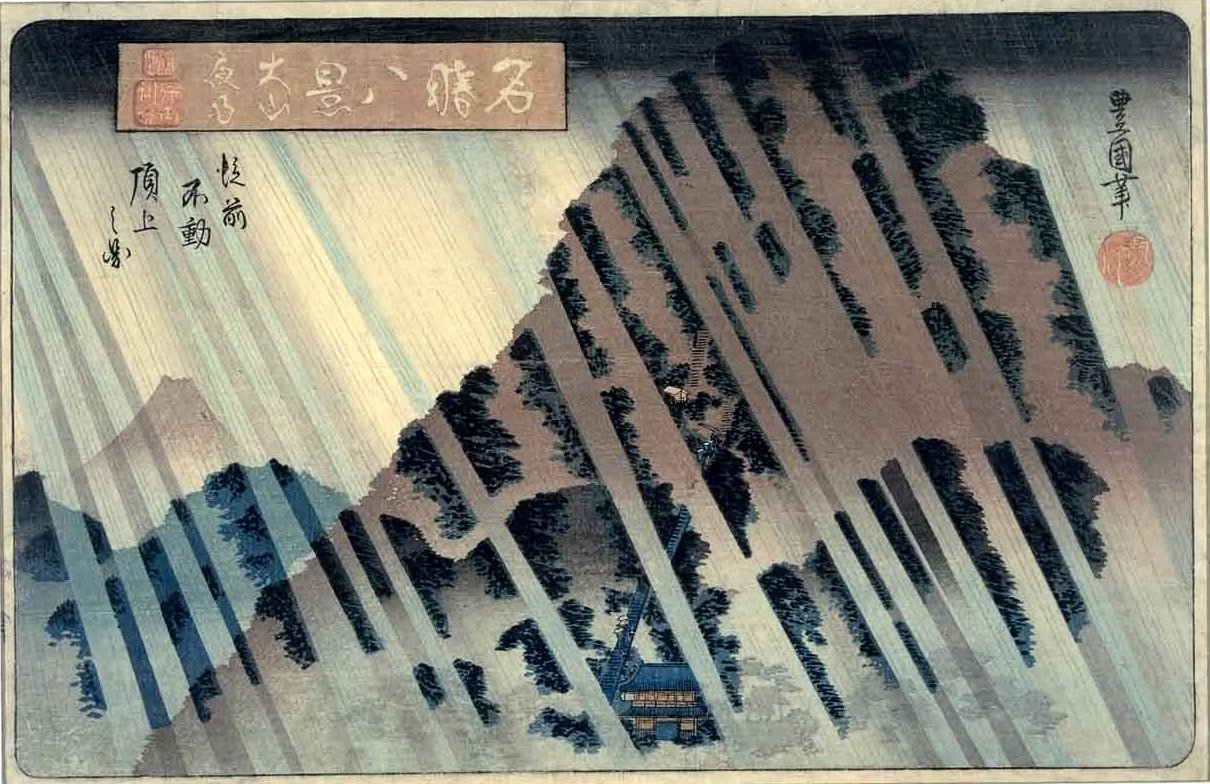
Utagawa Toyokuni II, Night Rain, Maya Mountain from the 8 Famous Views of the Xiao and Xiang Rivers, late 18th century - early 19th century

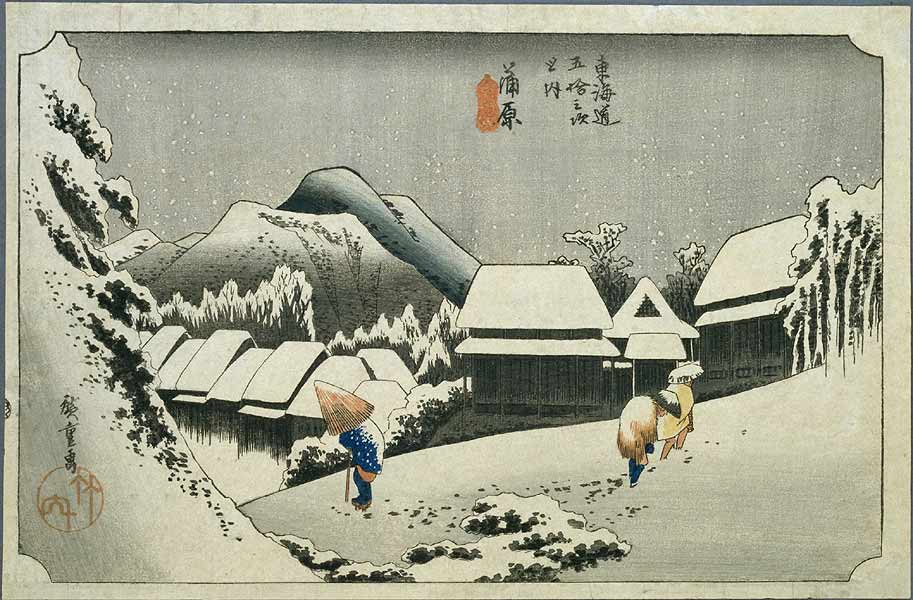
Utagawa Hiroshige, Nuit de neige à Kambara

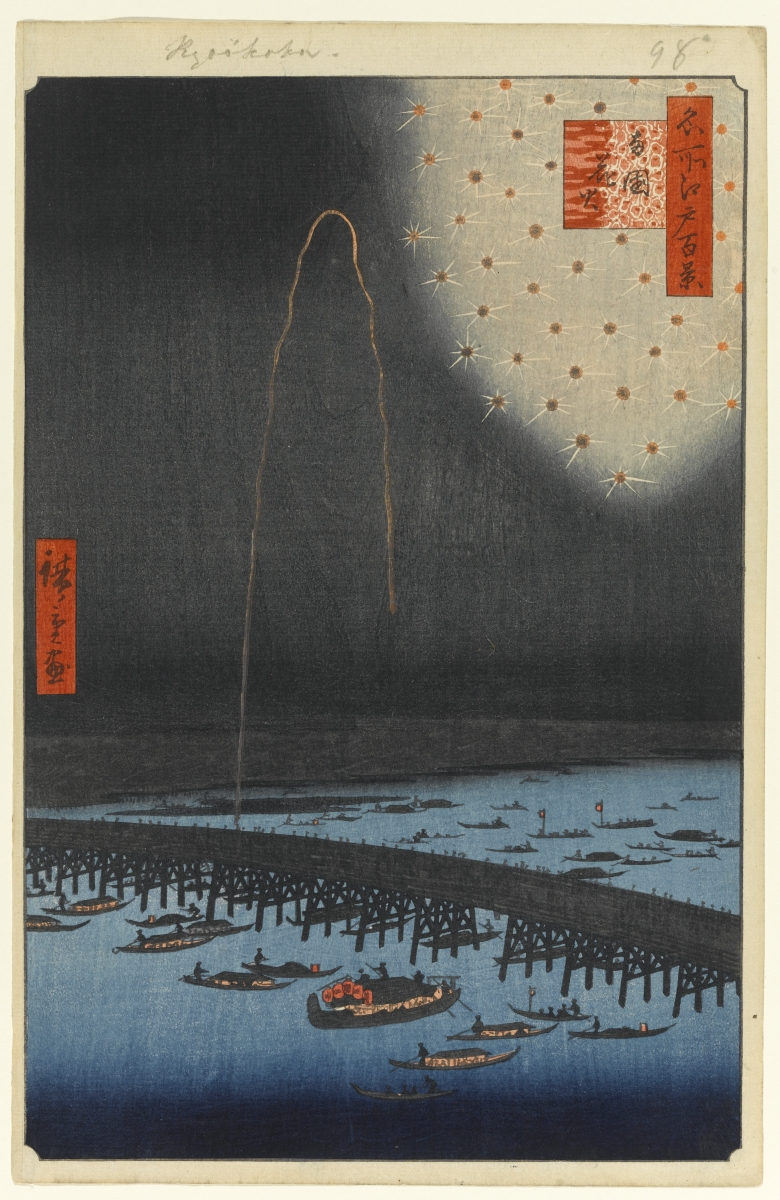
Utagawa Hiroshige, Fireworks at Ryōgoku (Ryōgoku Hanabi), One Hundred Famous Views of Edo #98, 1858, Brooklyn museum

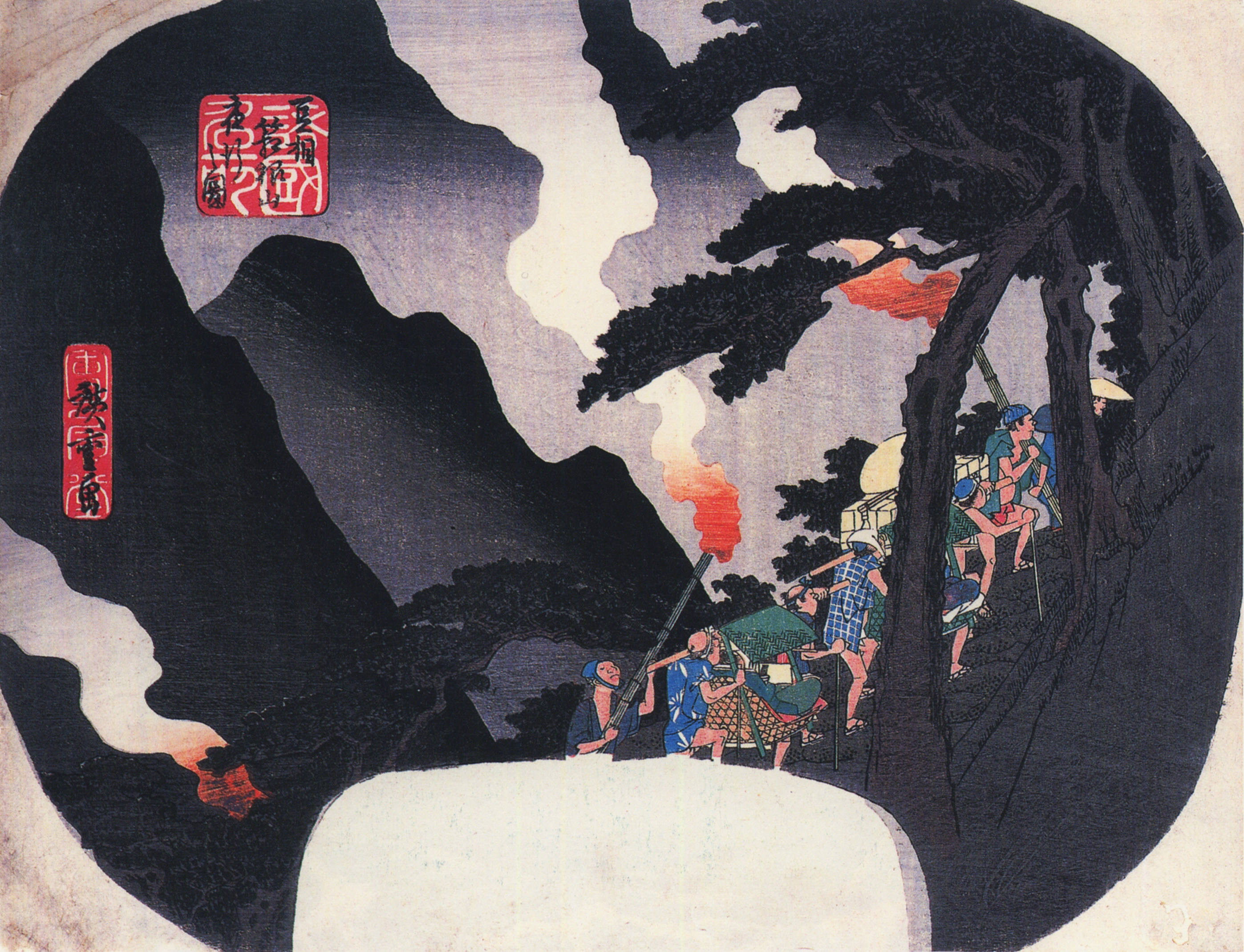
Utagawa Hiroshige, Travellers on a mountain path at night

According to the Metropolitan Museum of Art, Night Rains, of the 8 Famous Views of the Xiao and Xiang Rivers, is "a venerable theme in both Chinese and Japanese painting".

Fireworks at Ryōgoku captures the popular summer entertainment called "taking in the cool of the evening."

===== Mood setting =====
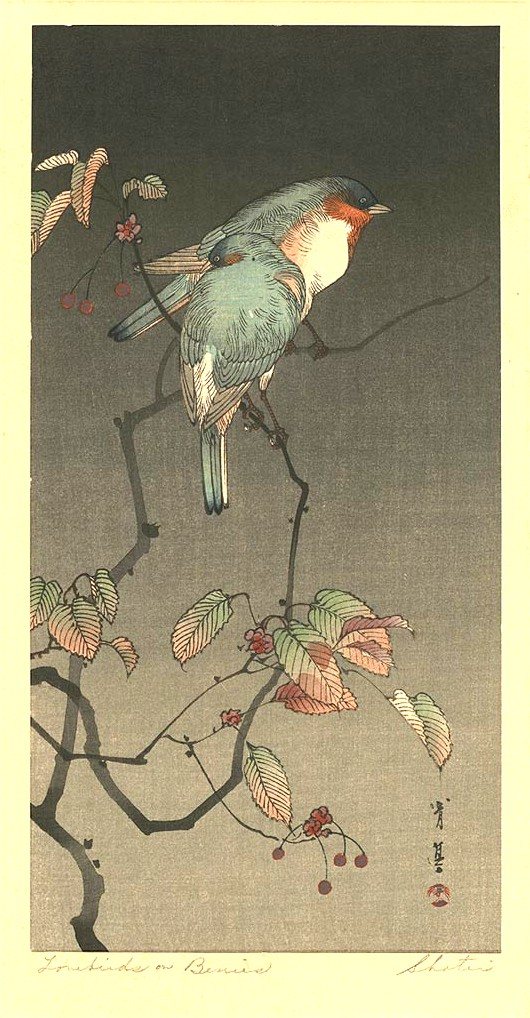
Watanabe Shōtei, Blue Birds at Night, 1851–1918

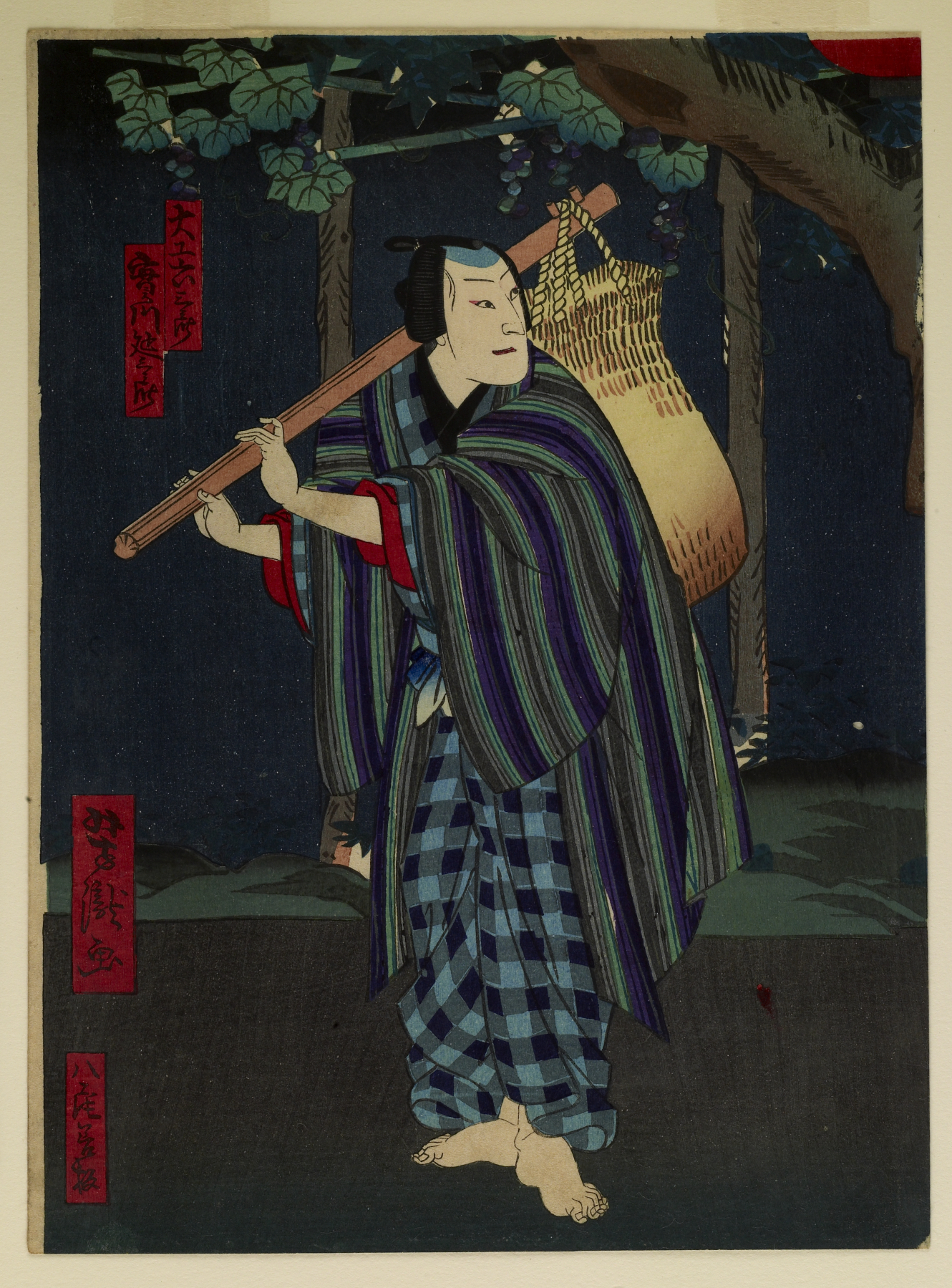
Utagawa Yoshitaki, Night Traveler, circa between 1860 and 69 (late Edo), Walters Art Museum

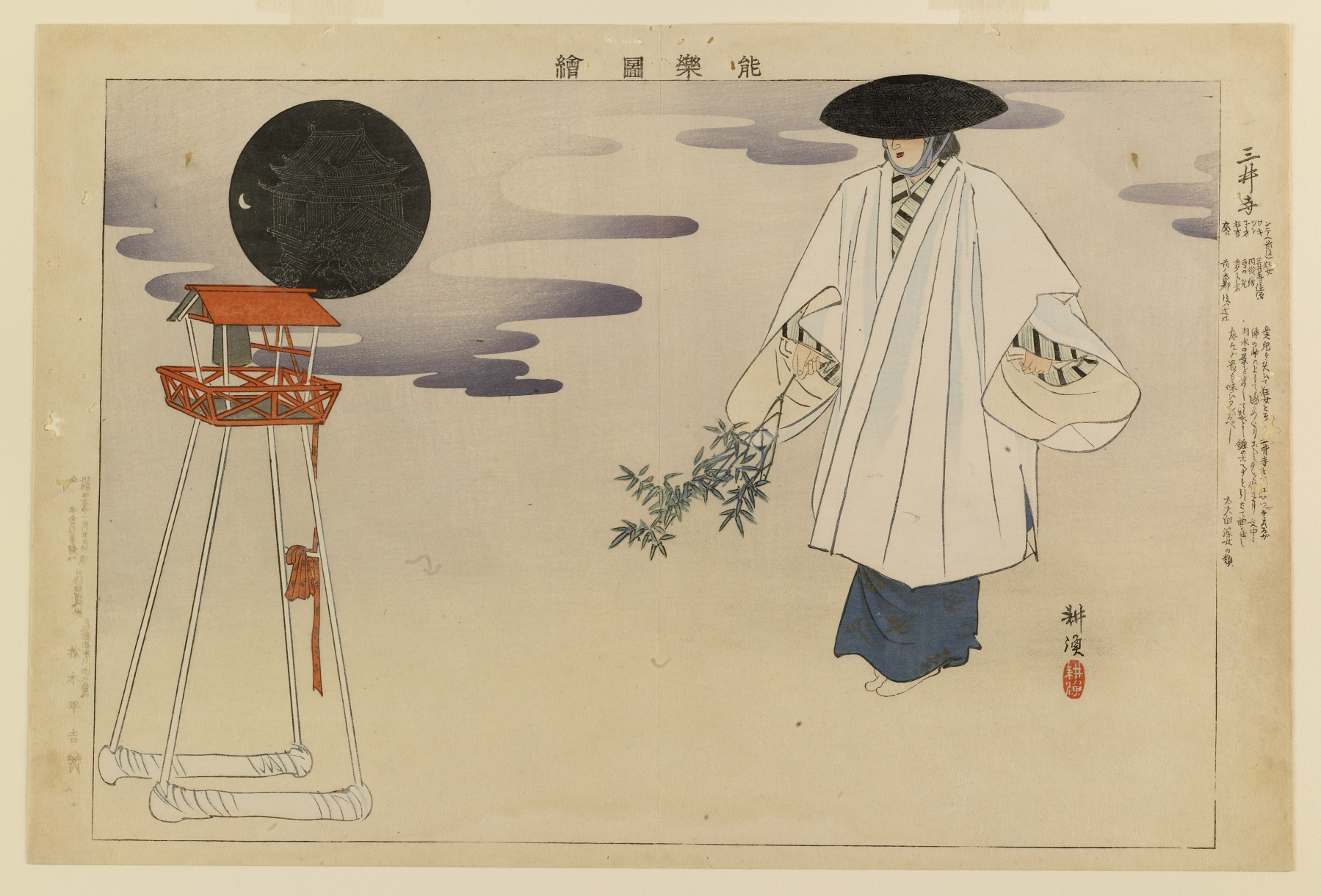
Kōgyo Tsukioka, Nogaku zue, 1899 (Meiji), Walters Art Museum

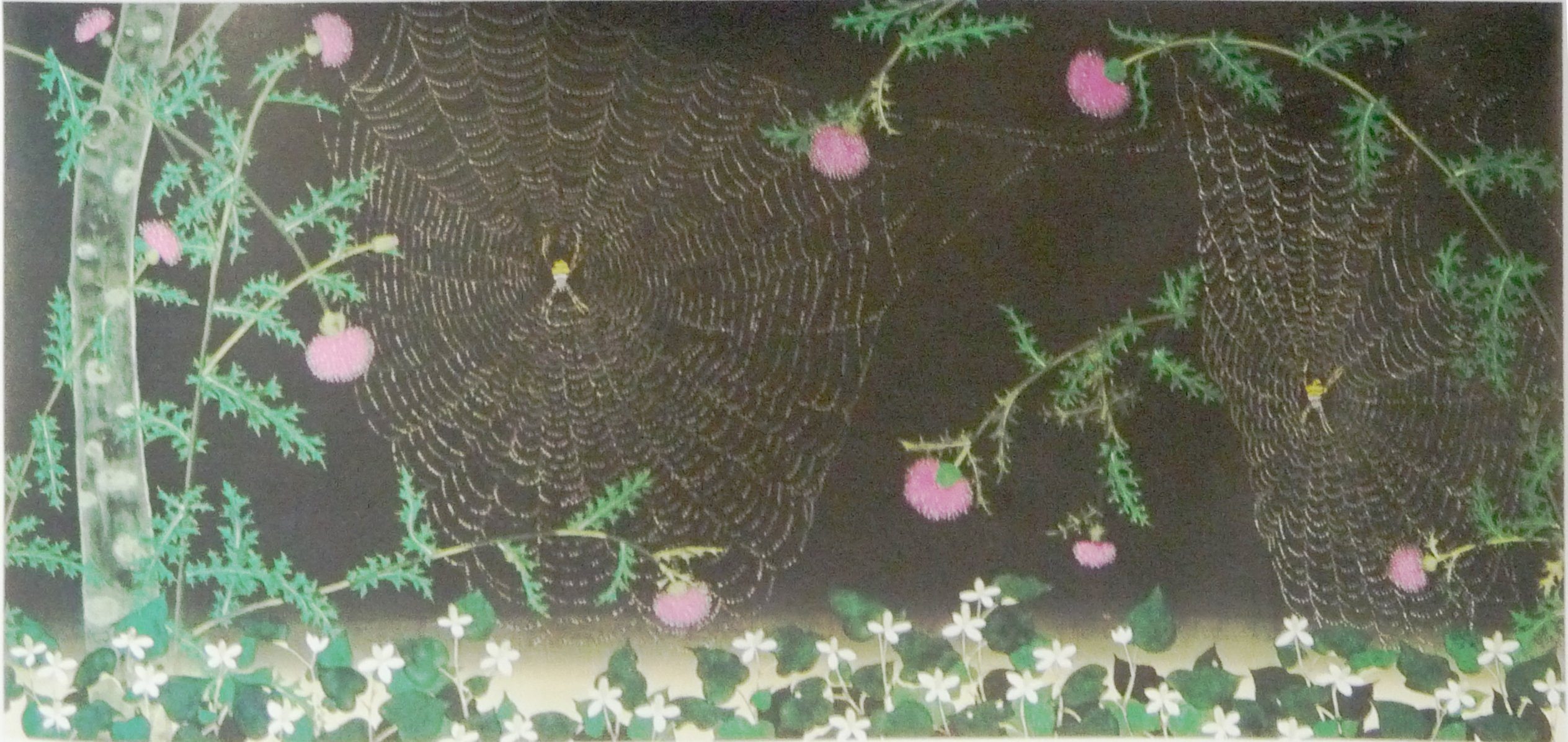
Omoda Seiju, Yotsuyu (Night Dew), 1926 (Japan)

===== Moon =====
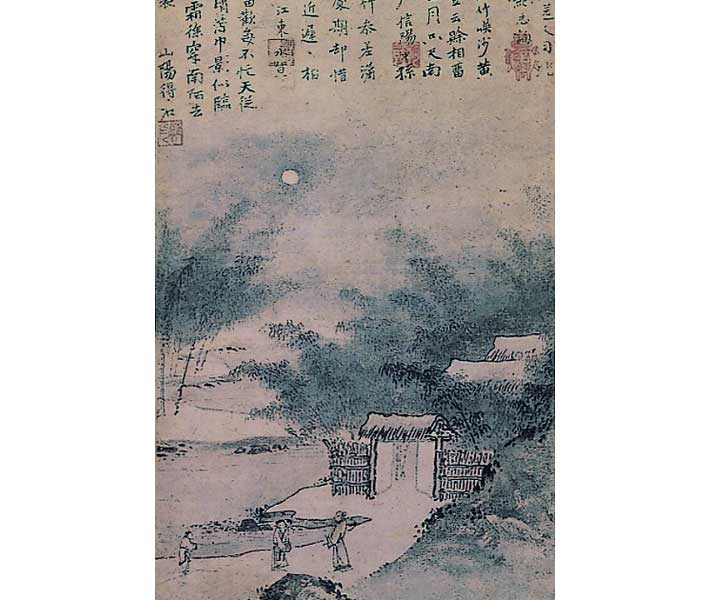
New Moon over the brushwood gate, 1405 (Japan), National Treasure of Japan

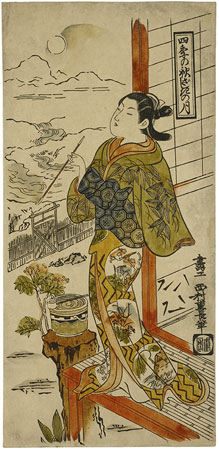
Nishimura Shigenaga, Four Seasons – Autumn Moon above the Reception Room, 1725–1730

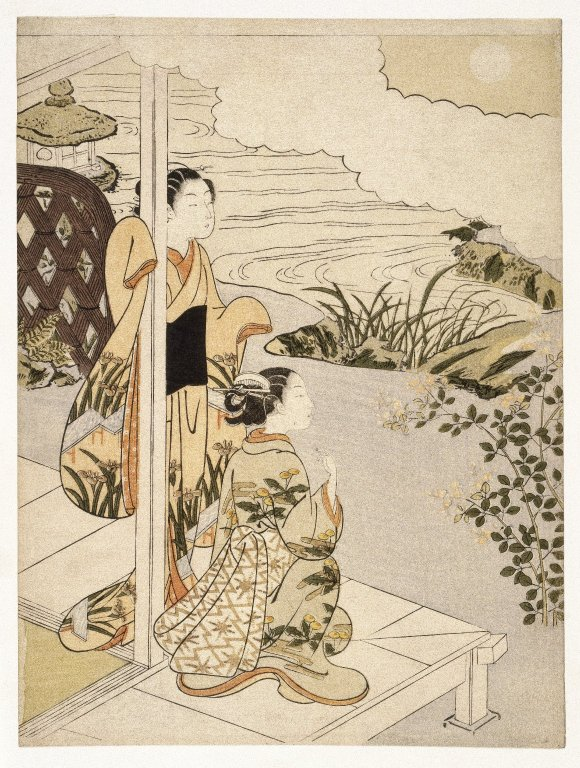
Suzuki Harunobu, Two Girls on the Veranda Looking at the Moon, 18th century, Brooklyn Museum.

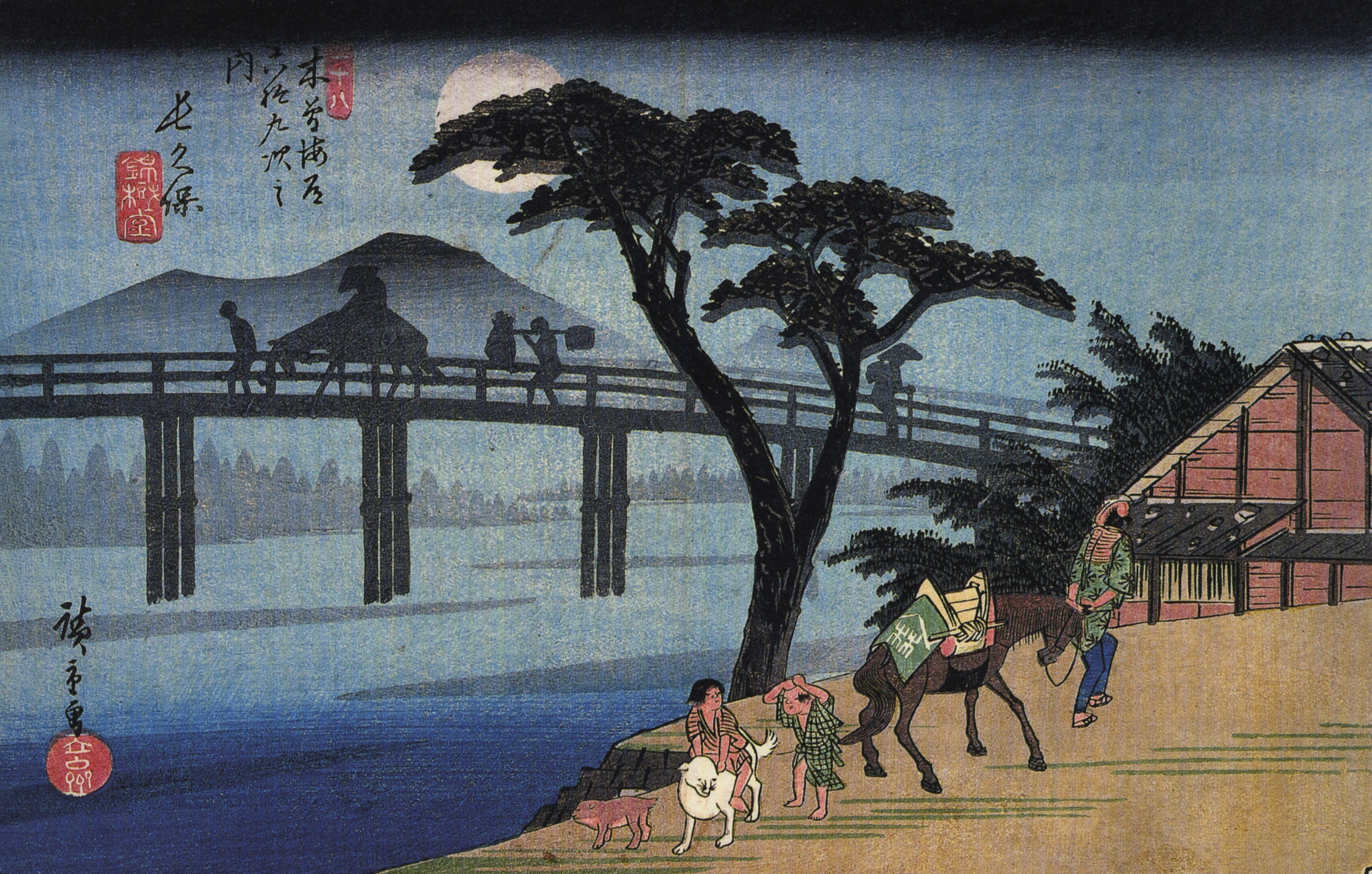
Utagawa Hiroshige, Man on horseback crossing a bridge, The Sixty-nine Stations of the Kiso Kaidō

Suzuki Harunobu made many night paintings, including Two Girls on the Veranda Looking at the Moon. Many of the settings were warm relational studies, such as Night Rain at the Double-Shelf Stand which includes a parlor scene with two young women and a boy. A soft mood is set with the presence of a tea set and portable hearth for boiling water. The Metropolitan Museum of Art states that this painting is a nod to Night Rains of 8 Views of the Xiao and Xiang Rivers, a painting well respected by both the Japanese and Chinese.

==== Korea ====
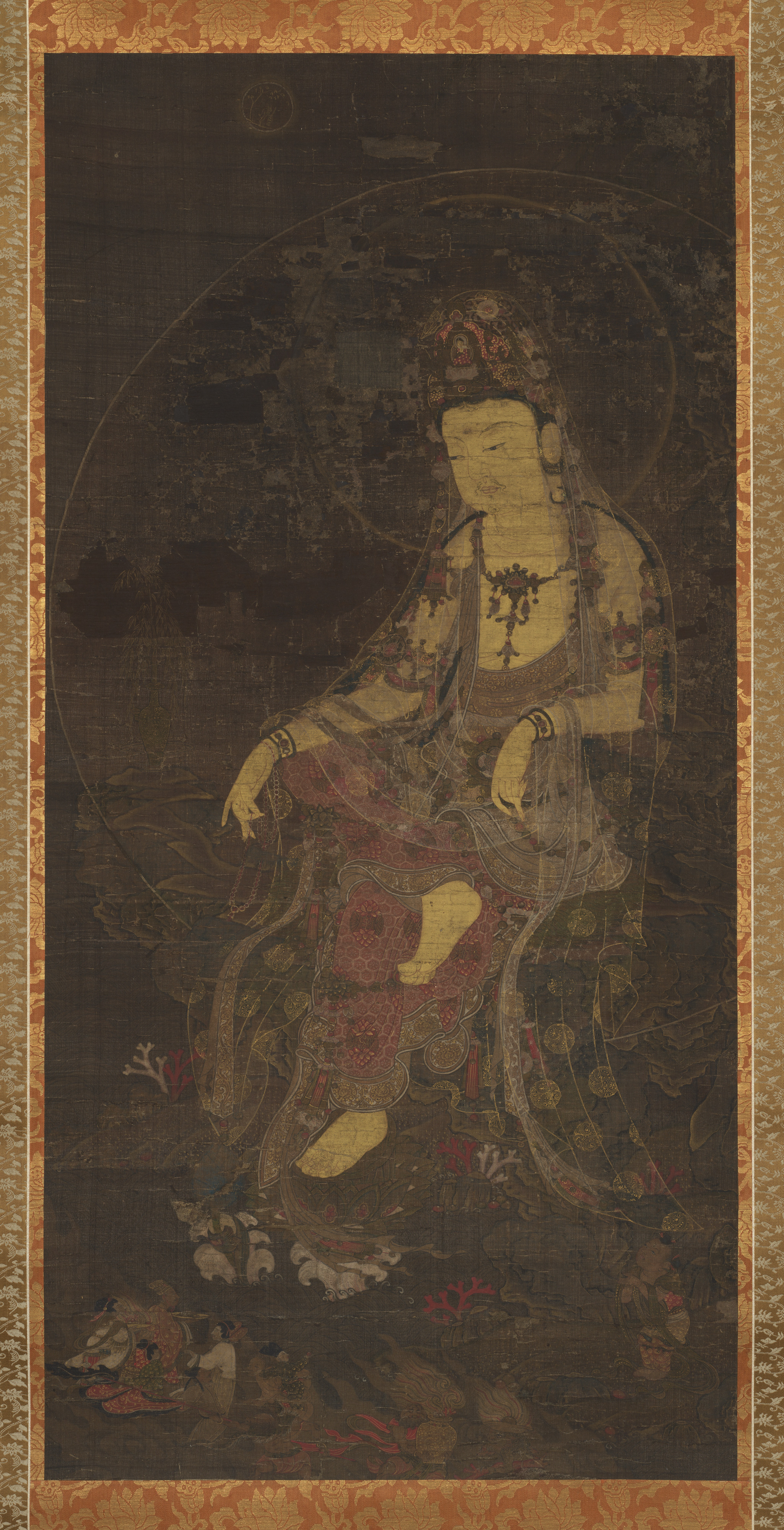
Water-Moon Avalokiteshvara, first half of the 14th century, Goryeo dynasty, Korea, Metropolitan Museum of Art, New York

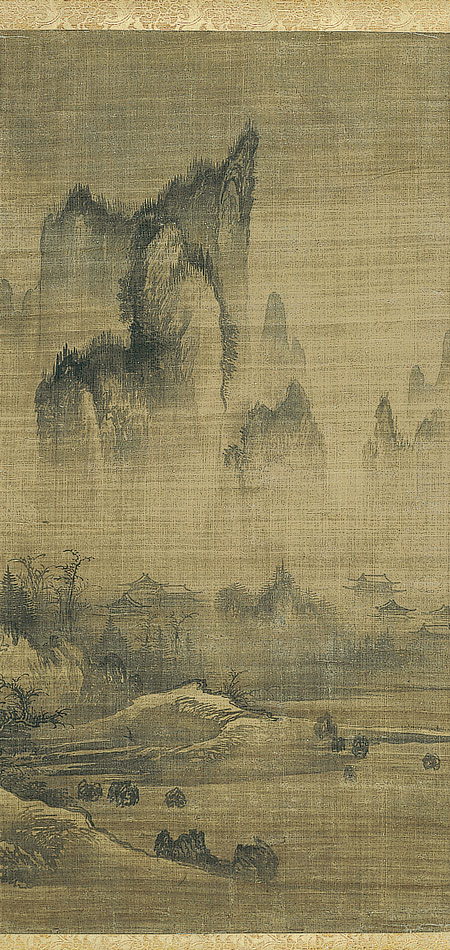
Landscapes in the Style of An Kyôn: Evening Bell from Mist-Shrouded Temple and Autumn Moon over Lake Dongting, 15th century, Chosôn dynasty, Metropolitan Museum of Art

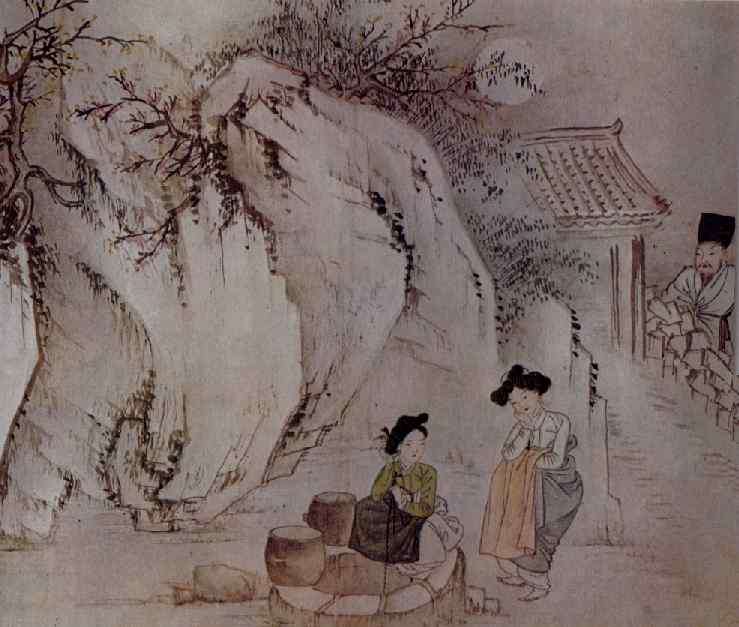
Shin Yunbok, Chatting at a well at night, In the late Joseon period, presumed after 1805, Gansong Art Museum in Seoul, South Korea

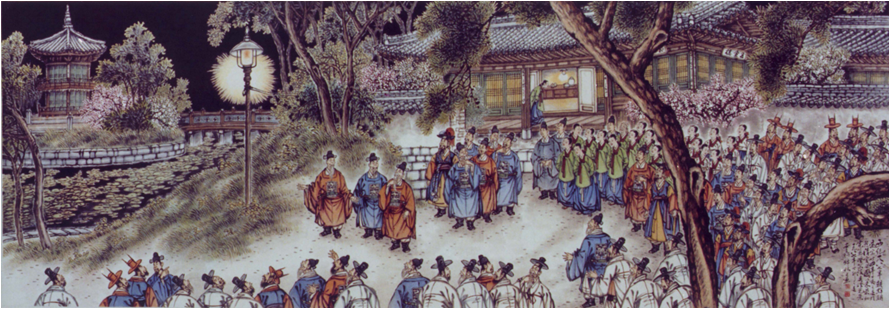
Geumchoo Nam-ho Lee, First Electric Light at Gyeongbok Palace, 1887 (Korean), Korea Electric Power Corporation

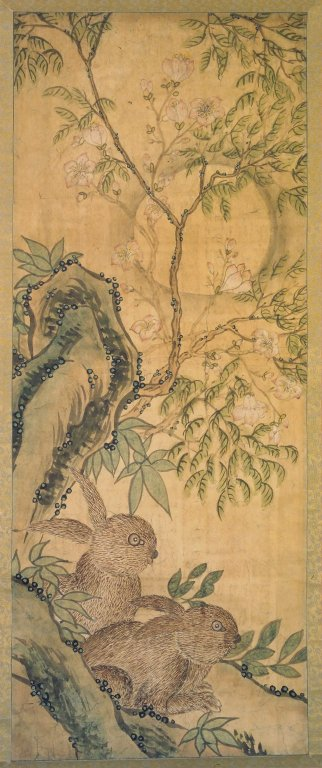
Artist Unknown(Korean), Rabbits and Moon, 19th century, Brooklyn Museum

Buddhism was an important part of Korean art since about the time of the Unified Silla period when there was a desire to be open to other religions. This resulted in the use of Buddhist themes in art work and the creation of Buddhist temples. In the 14th century, a work was made of Water-Moon Avalokiteshvara, a compassionate and wise bodhisattva who wears a halo as a sign of his divinity and has waves of water splashing his feet. A legendary hare stands under a cassia tree in the moon creating the elixir of immortality.

=== South Asian art ===
==== India ====
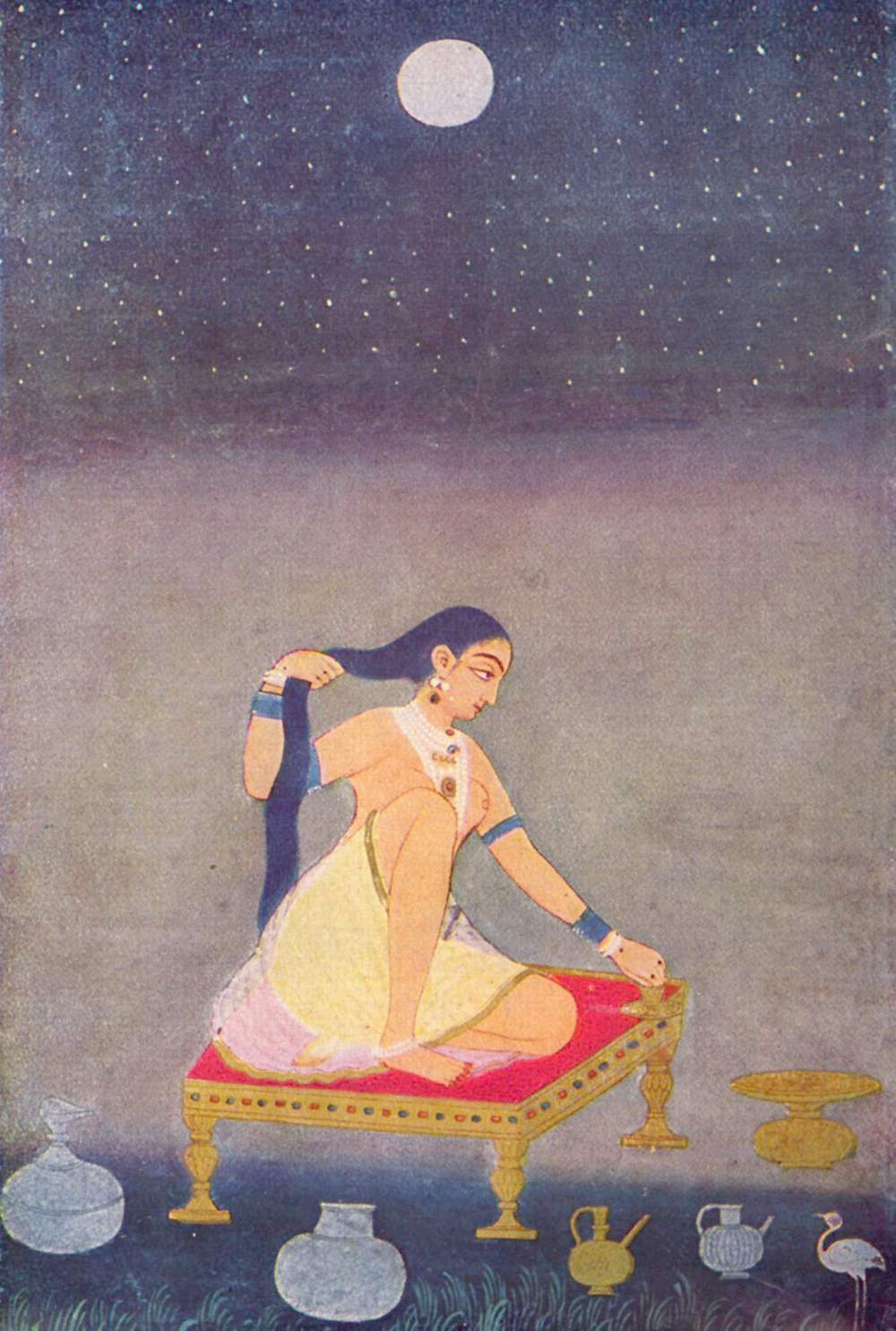
Artist unknown, Radha at night, circa 1650 (Mughal), Kupferstichkabinett Berlin

For traditional art, there is little difference between the way night and day are illustrated and the colors that are used. For instance, in early Rajput (also called Rajasthani) paintings, the only way to read that the painting is a night scene is through the presence of torches or candles. Later in the Rajput period, both somewhat influenced by Western art, night scenes were painted dramatically with shadows and Mughal paintings used chiaroscuro for shading.

Although there are a number of schools that taught painting during India's history, there is great similarity among them to evoke charming, romantic scenes. The scenes may include moonlight or lanterns to set an amorous mood. Such was the case for 19th-century artist Chokha, who enjoyed making night paintings like Escapade at Night: A Nobleman Climbs a Rope to Visit his Lover. In that painting Chokha captures the tension of lover climbing several stories into a house with many people and a sleeping guard. Chokha also liked to capture twilight hunting scenes. He astutely conveyed the effects of lighting variation between twilight and the darkest night.

Rao Bhoj Singh Stalking a Tiger at Night is a painting attributed to the Hada Master of the Kota school. In this case the dark is used for dramatic impact. It provides a dark backdrop to the bright figures of the treed hunting party, riled tiger and battered cow that was used as a lure.

===== Romantic scenes =====
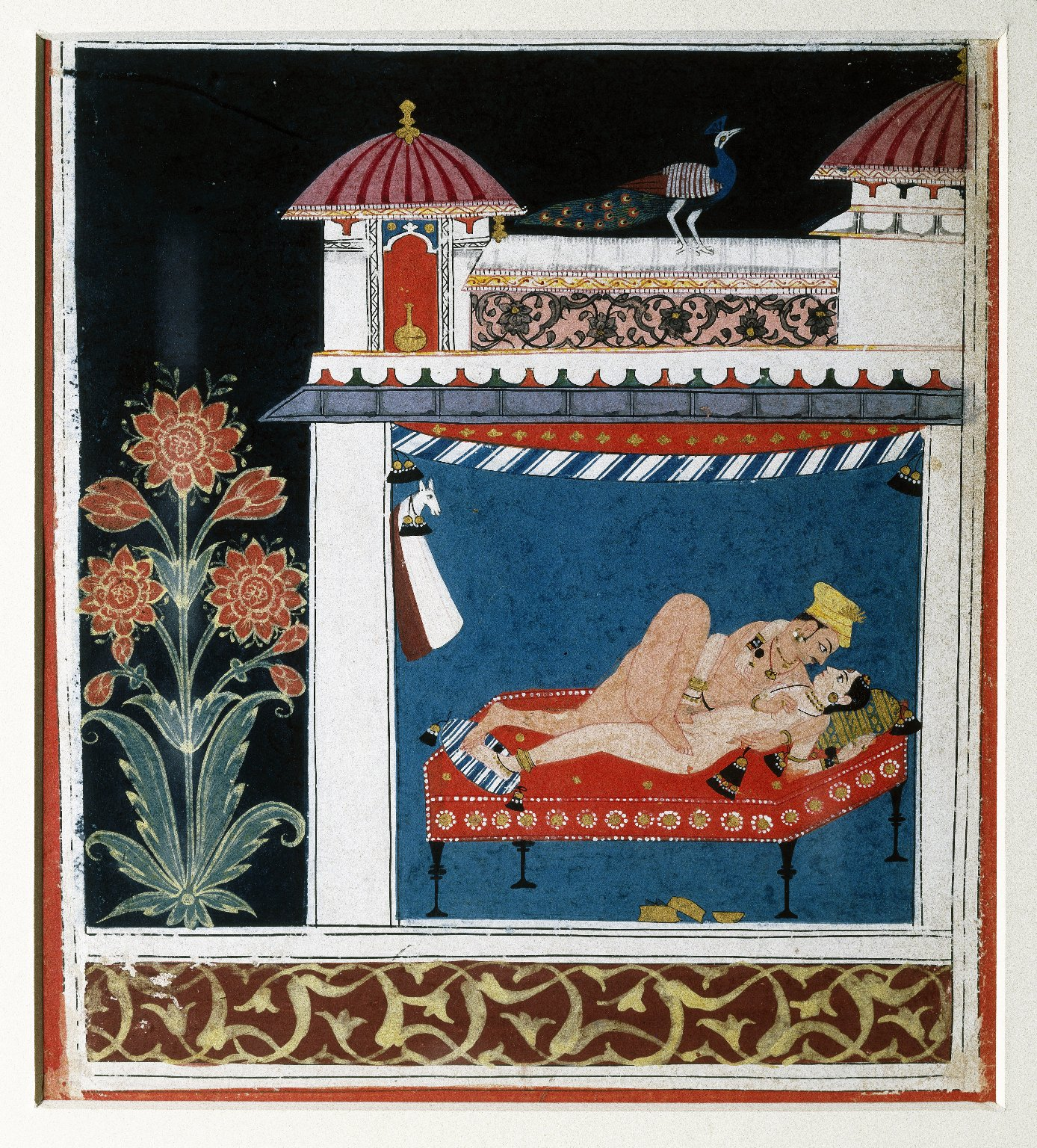
Artist Unknown, Love Scene Central India, 1660–1680, Brooklyn Museum

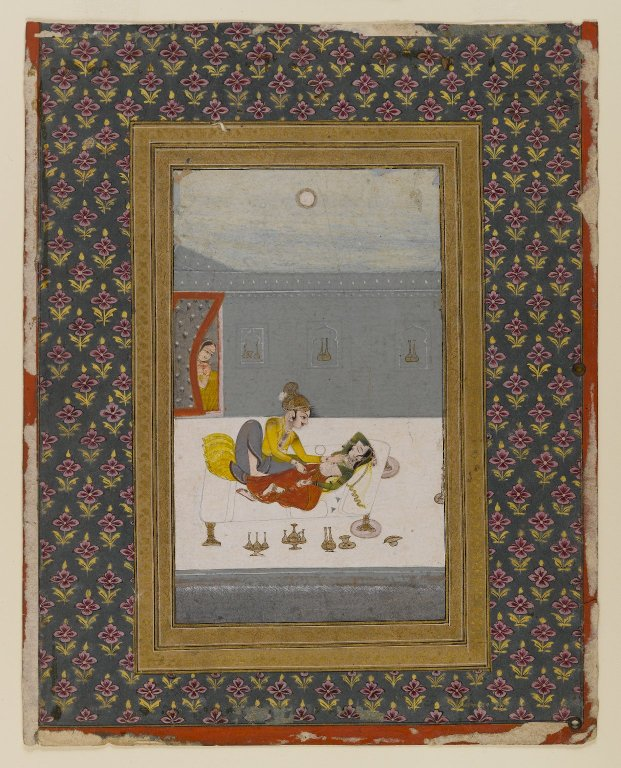
Artist Unknown, Lovers on a Moonlit Night, circa 1775 (India), Brooklyn Museum

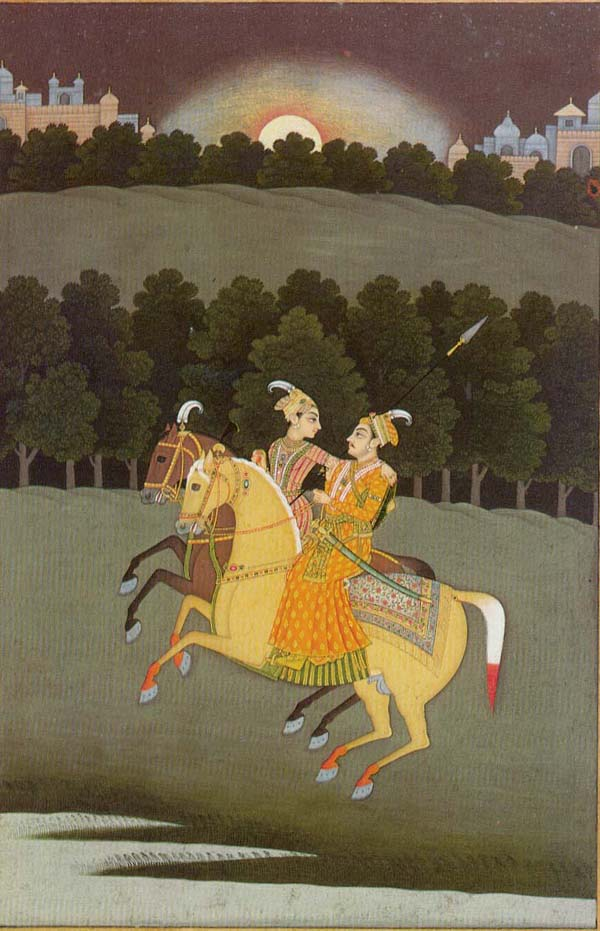
(Murshidabad) style, Baz Bahadur and Rupmati, c. 1760, India Office Library

Baz Bahadur and Rupmati (not shown) depicts mistress Rupmati and Muslim ruler Baz Bahadur. The scene is illuminated from the moon on the horizon.

=== Southeast Asian art ===
==== Cambodia ====
Wat Mural, 1903–1904, Phnom Penh's Silver Pagoda

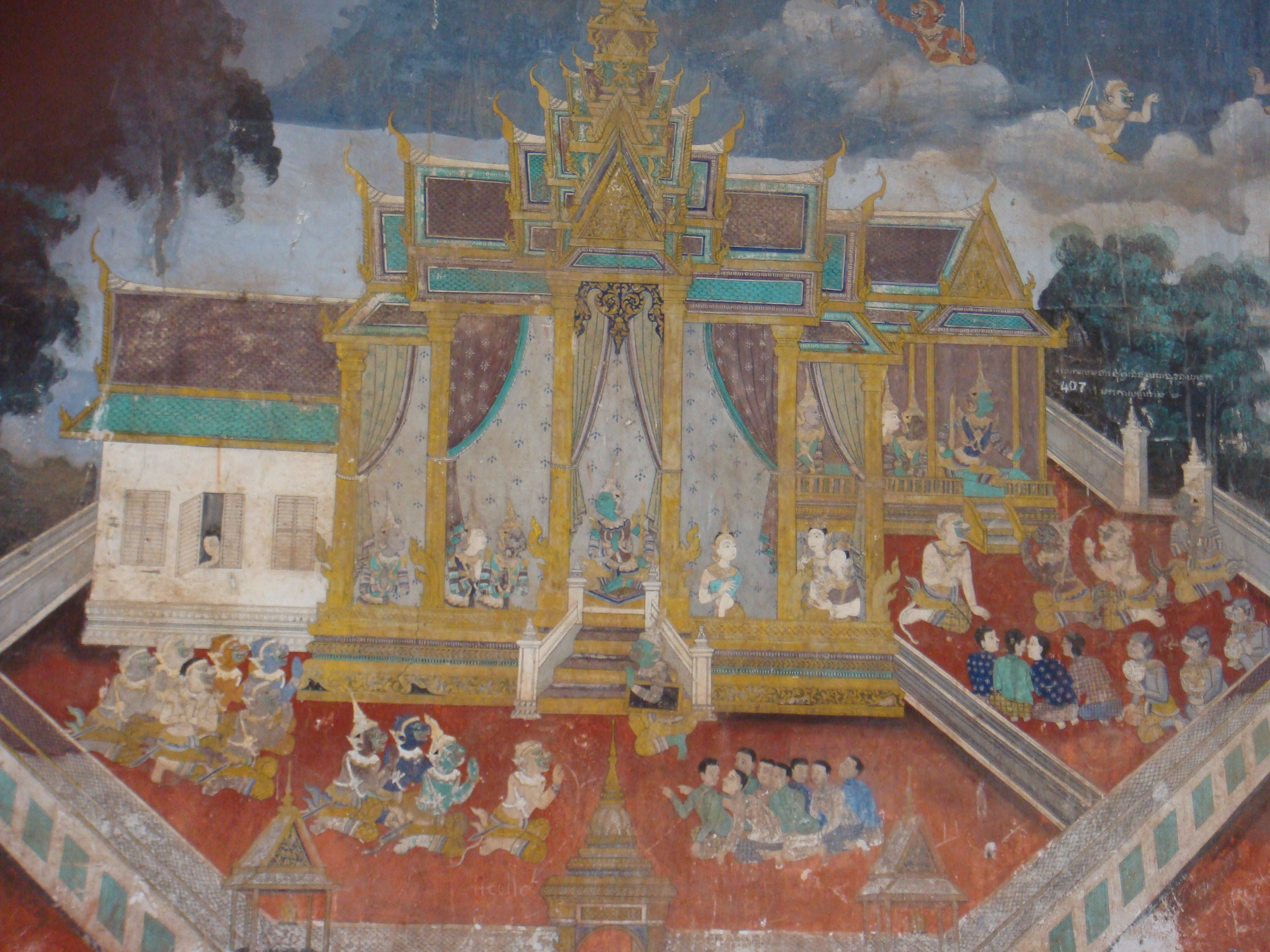
Reamker mural, Cambodia

Cambodian paintings often took the form of murals, (Note: Much historical Cambodian art, such as the collections of the Founan-Chenla, Angkor, Lungvek, and Oudong periods, was destroyed during the reign of the Khumer Rouge, starting 1975 and the preceding years of American bombings from 1964 to 1975.) and have religious significance. Before 1200, art in the temples mostly portrayed scenes from the Hindu pantheon; after 1200, Buddhist scenes began to appear as standard motifs. Its art was heavily influenced by the artistry of India.

==== Thailand ====
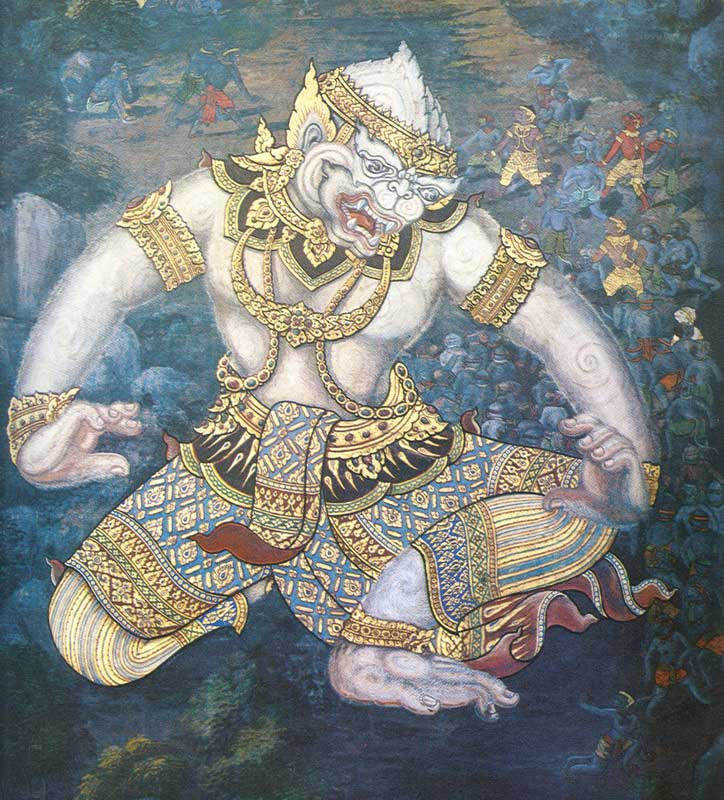
Hanuman, mural painting, Wat Phra Kaeo, Bangkok

=== West Asian art ===
==== Persia ====
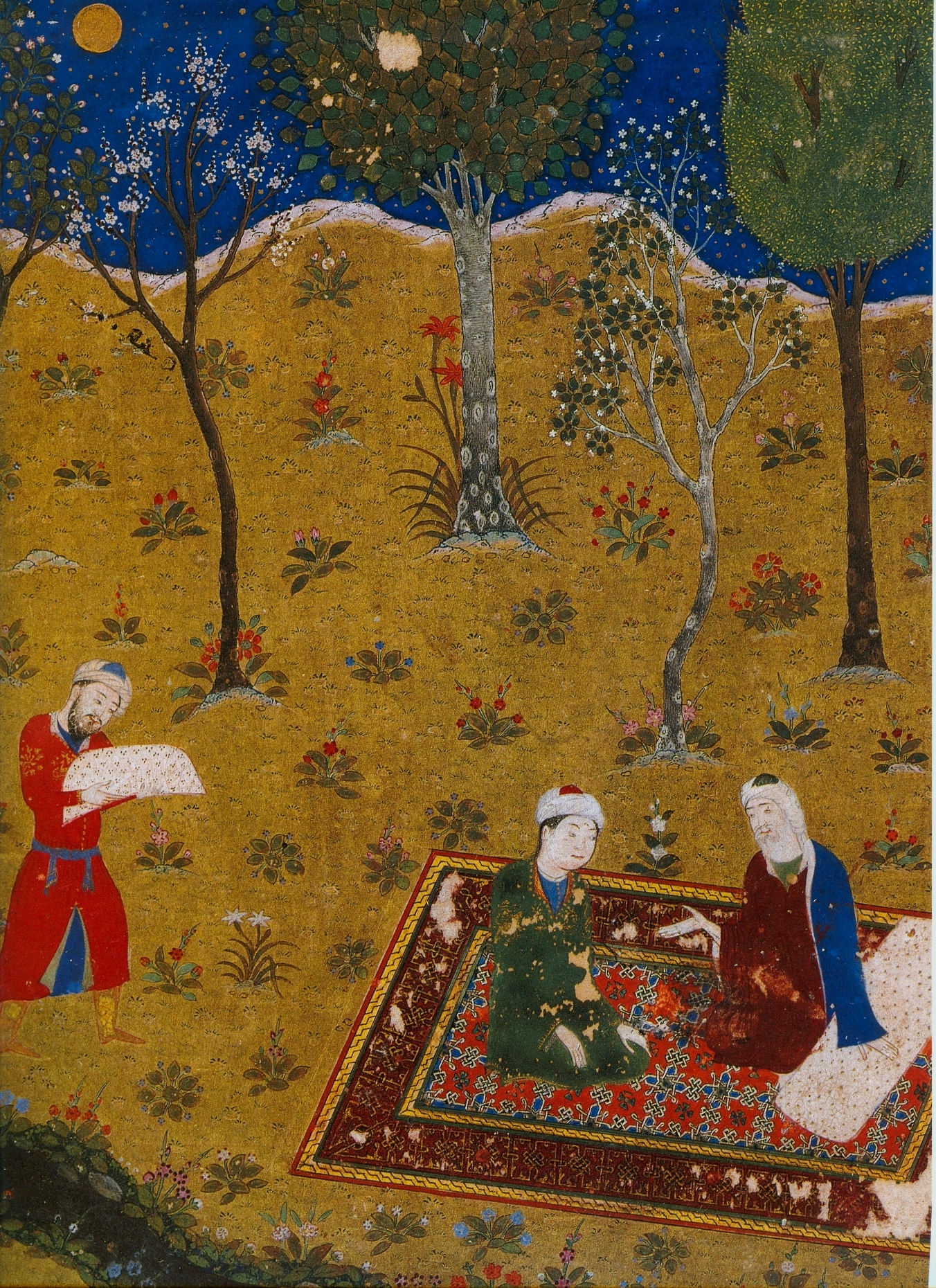
The poet Sa'di converses by night with a young friend in a garden (Gulistan of Sa'di miniature), 1427 (Persia), Chester Beatty Library, Dublin.

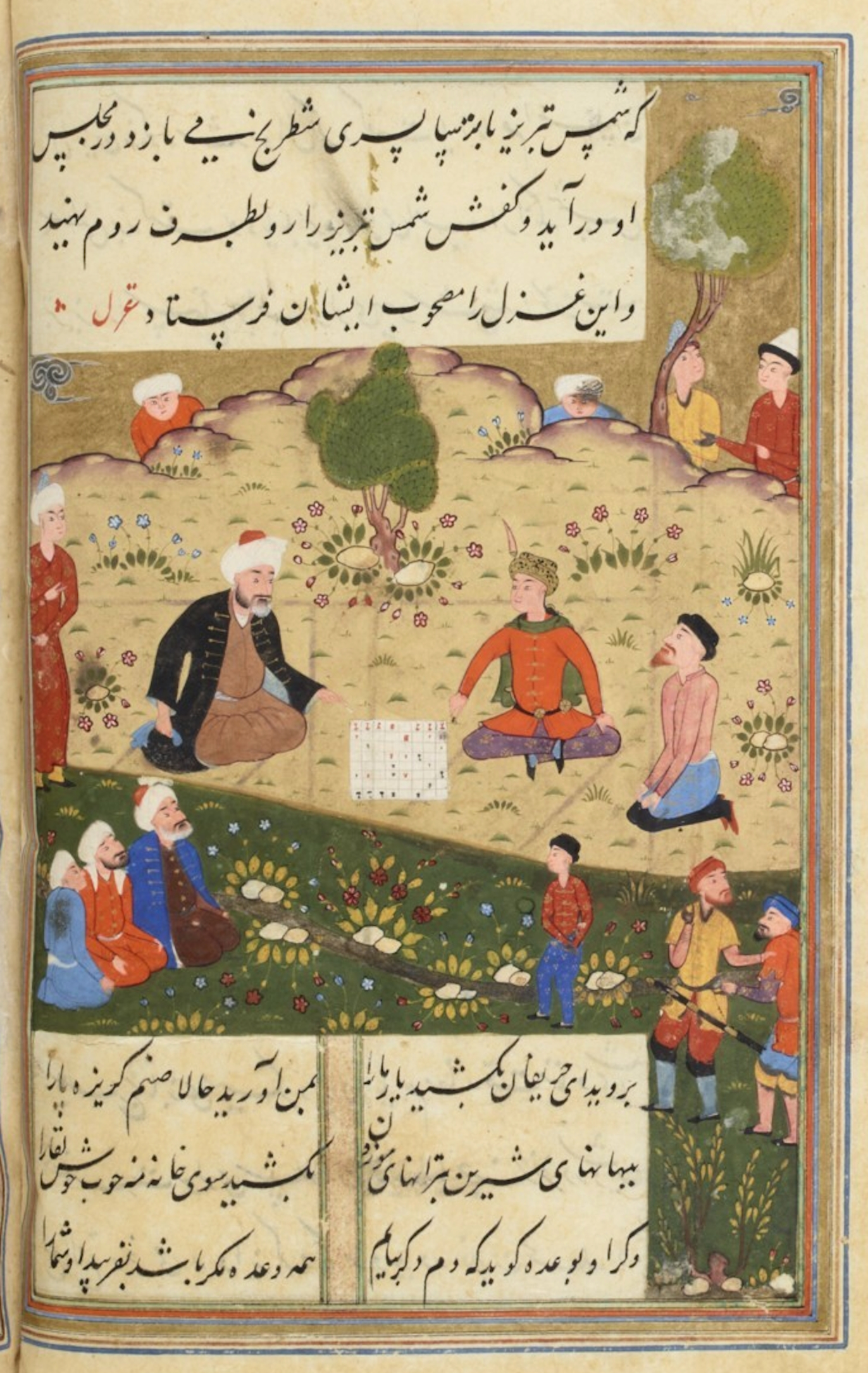
A page of a copy circa 1503 of the Dīvān-e Šams-e Tabrīzī. See: Rumi ghazal 163. The lower half is night.

== By religion ==
=== Buddhism ===
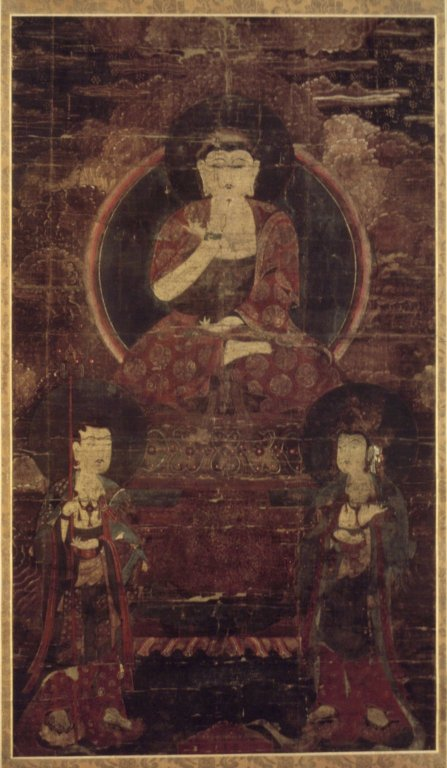
Amitabha Buddha Triad, ca. 16th century. Hanging scroll, Brooklyn Museum

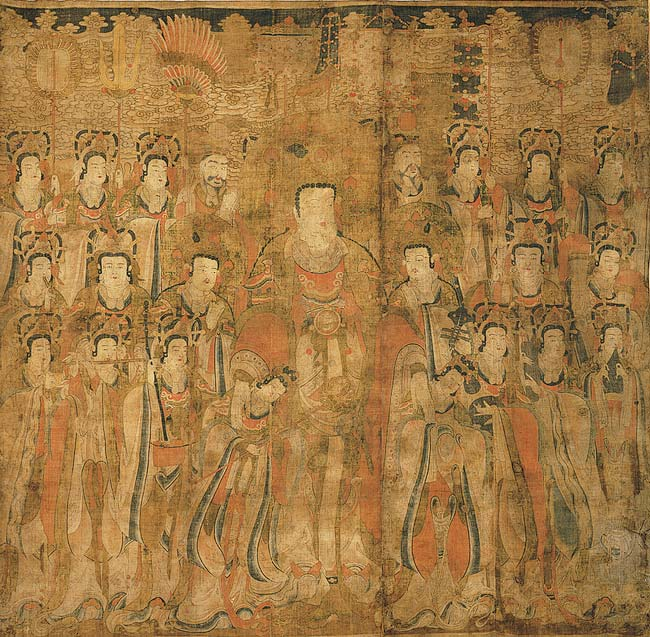
Brahma with Attendants and Musicians (Pômch’ôn), 16th century, Joseon dynasty, Korea, Metropolitan Museum of Art

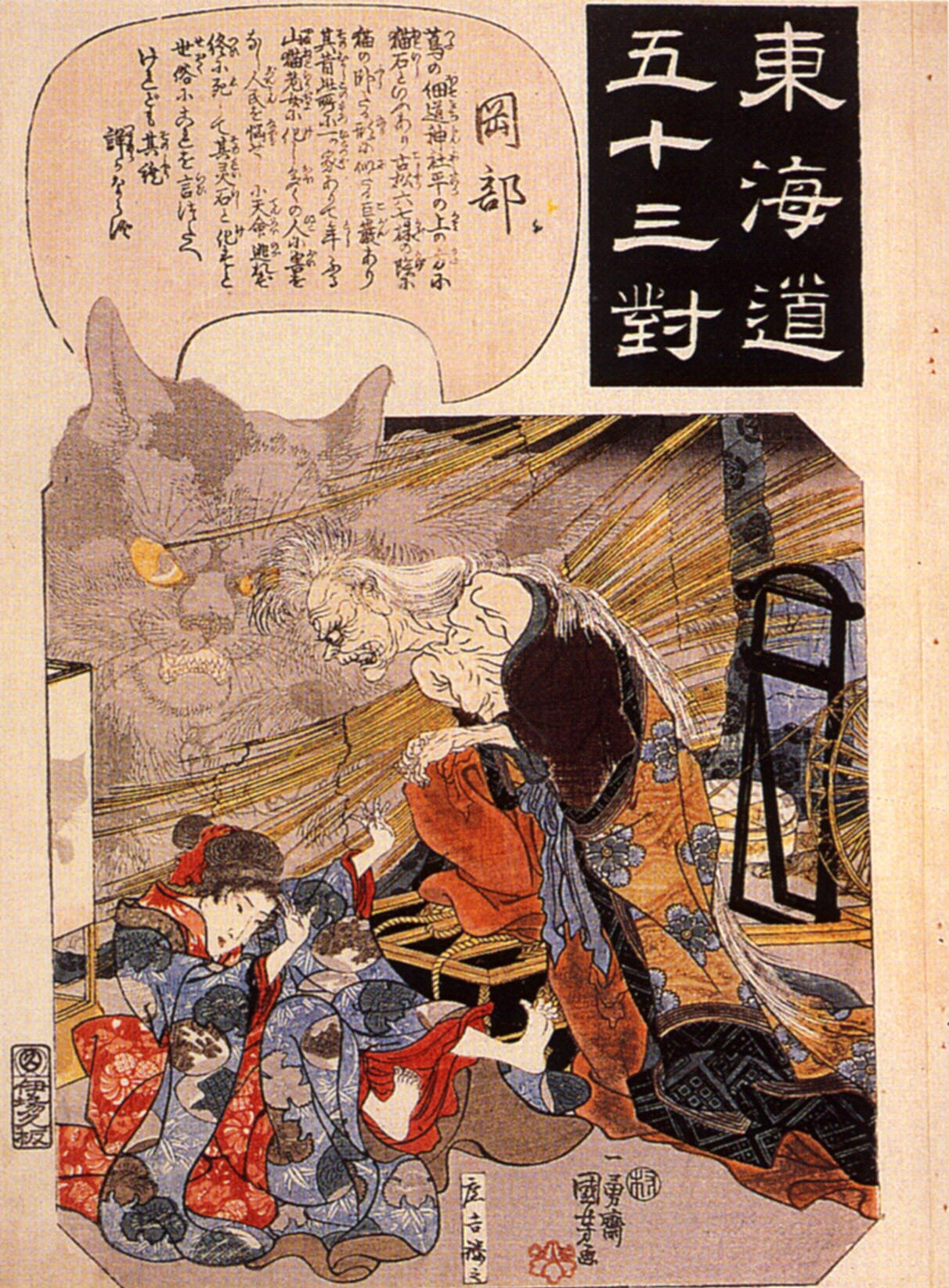
Utagawa Kuniyoshi, Okabe, c. 1844.

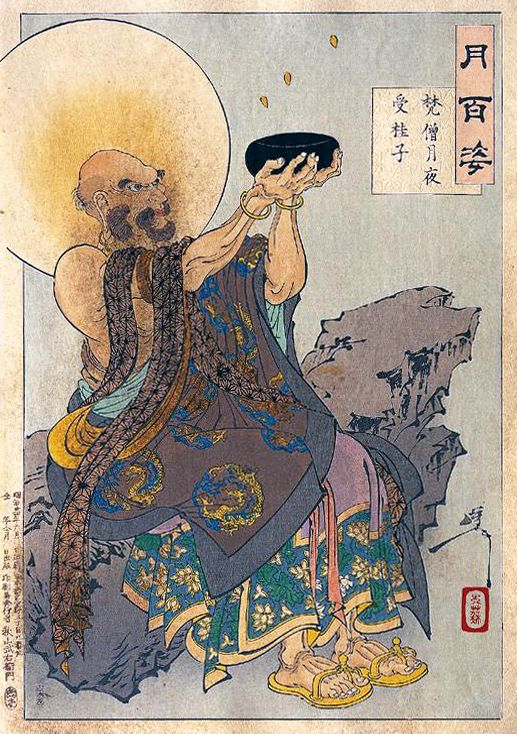
Tsukioka Yoshitoshi, A Buddhist monk receives cassia seeds on a moonlit night or Bonso tsukiyo ni keishi o uku, from 100 Aspects of the Moon, before 1892

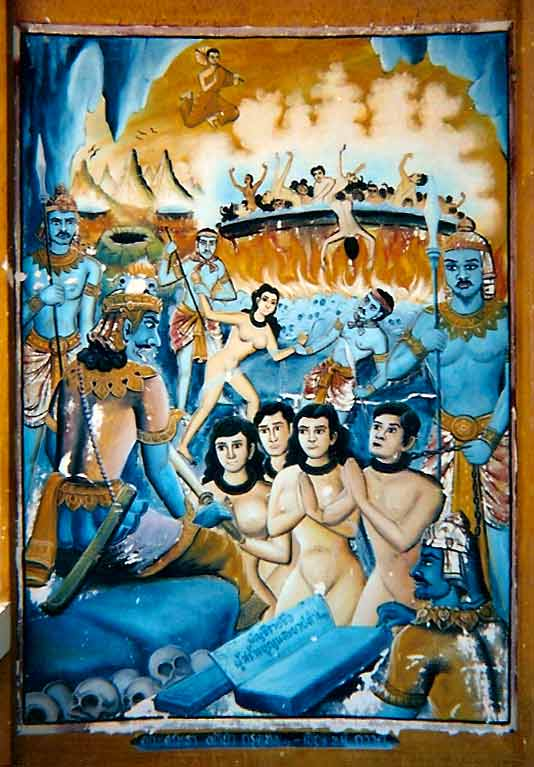
Mural on a Buddhist temple, date unknown, northern Thailand

Brahma with Attendants and Musicians depicts a Brahma (Korean: Beomcheon) heaven scene which was painted during the early Joseon dynasty in Korea. Brahma, a Hindu deity, also became part of the Buddhist religion and protected the Buddhist teaching. The heavenly scene is includes musicians with flutes, violins, lutes and other instruments. Smith, author of Arts in Korea, writes: "His abode, the Brahma heaven, was construed as a place of pleasure, populated with heroes, entertainers and musicians." The work, replete with evidence of grandeur, includes two figures who represent the moon and sun.

Utagawa Kuniyoshi made Okabe about 1844 which depicts the death of Buddha. In recounting the death of Buddha, cats are supposed to be the only animals that not to weep. In Kuniyoshi's time, it was believed that when a girl visited a temple after dark, she took the risk of being greeted by an old woman who would offer her to stay the night. Once inside the house, the old woman would become a witch and devour her. Therefore, a cat around temples could be the witch in a cat form.

=== Islamic ===
==== Muhammad's night ride ====
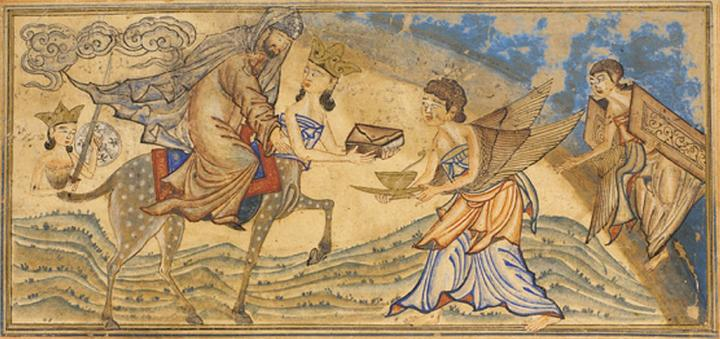
Rashid-al-Din Hamadani, Night Ride, c 1315 (Persian), Edinburgh University Library

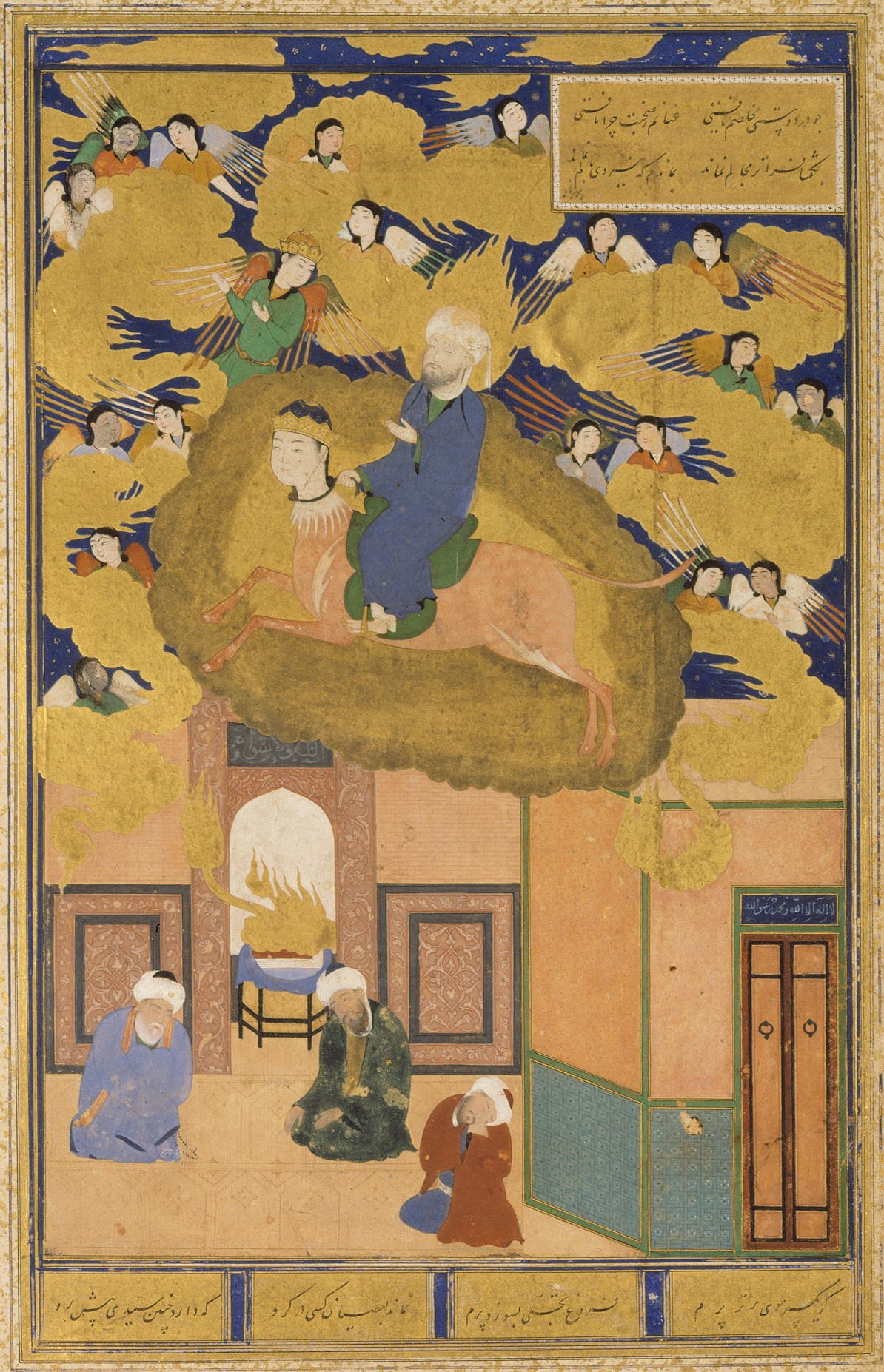
Artist Unknown, The Night Journey of Muhammad on His Steed, 1514 (Persia), Bukhara, Uzbekistan

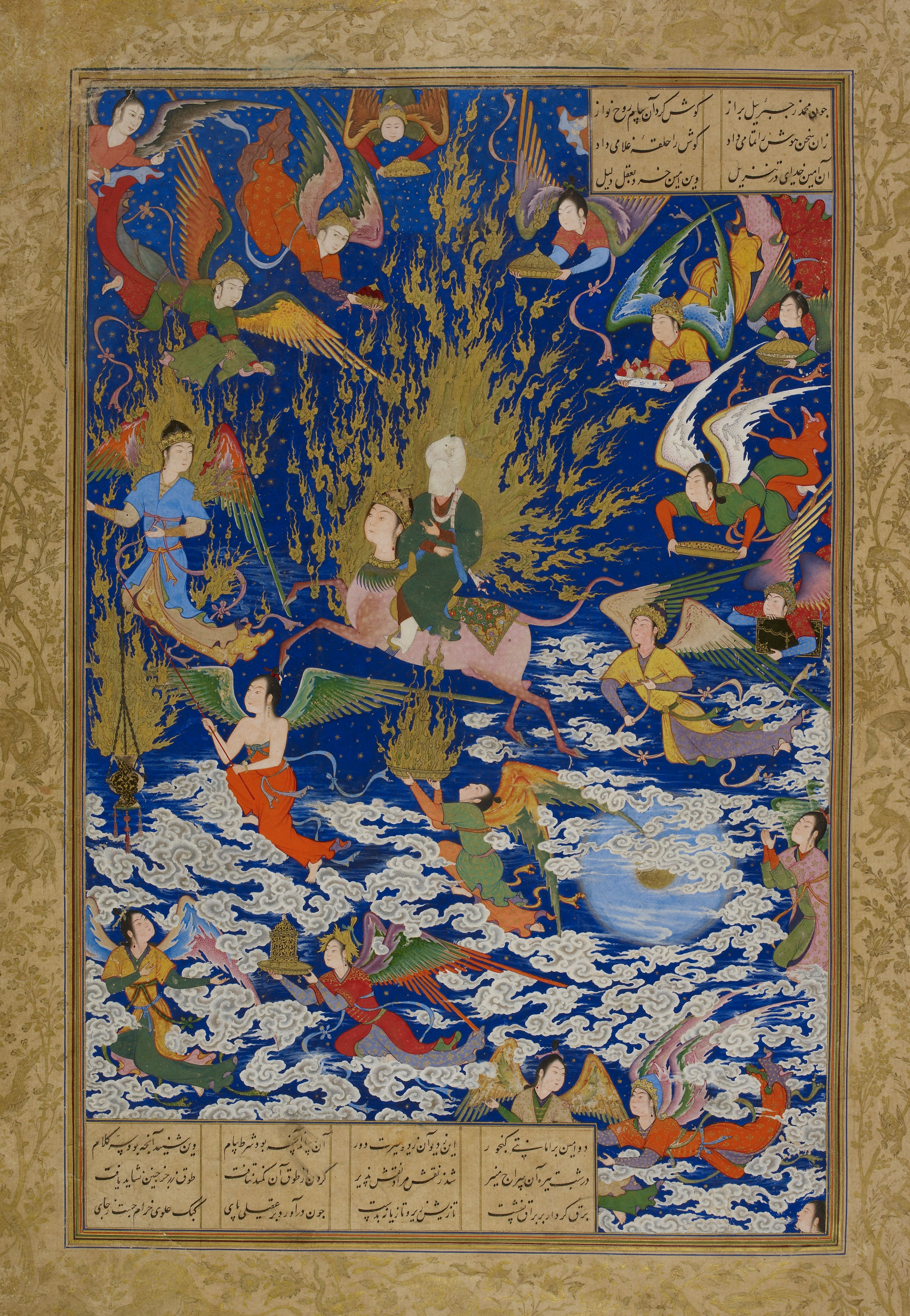
Nizami Ganjavi, The Ascent of Muhammad to Heaven on his steed Buraq, guided by Gabriel and escorted by angels., 1539-43 (Persia Safavid dynasty), British Library

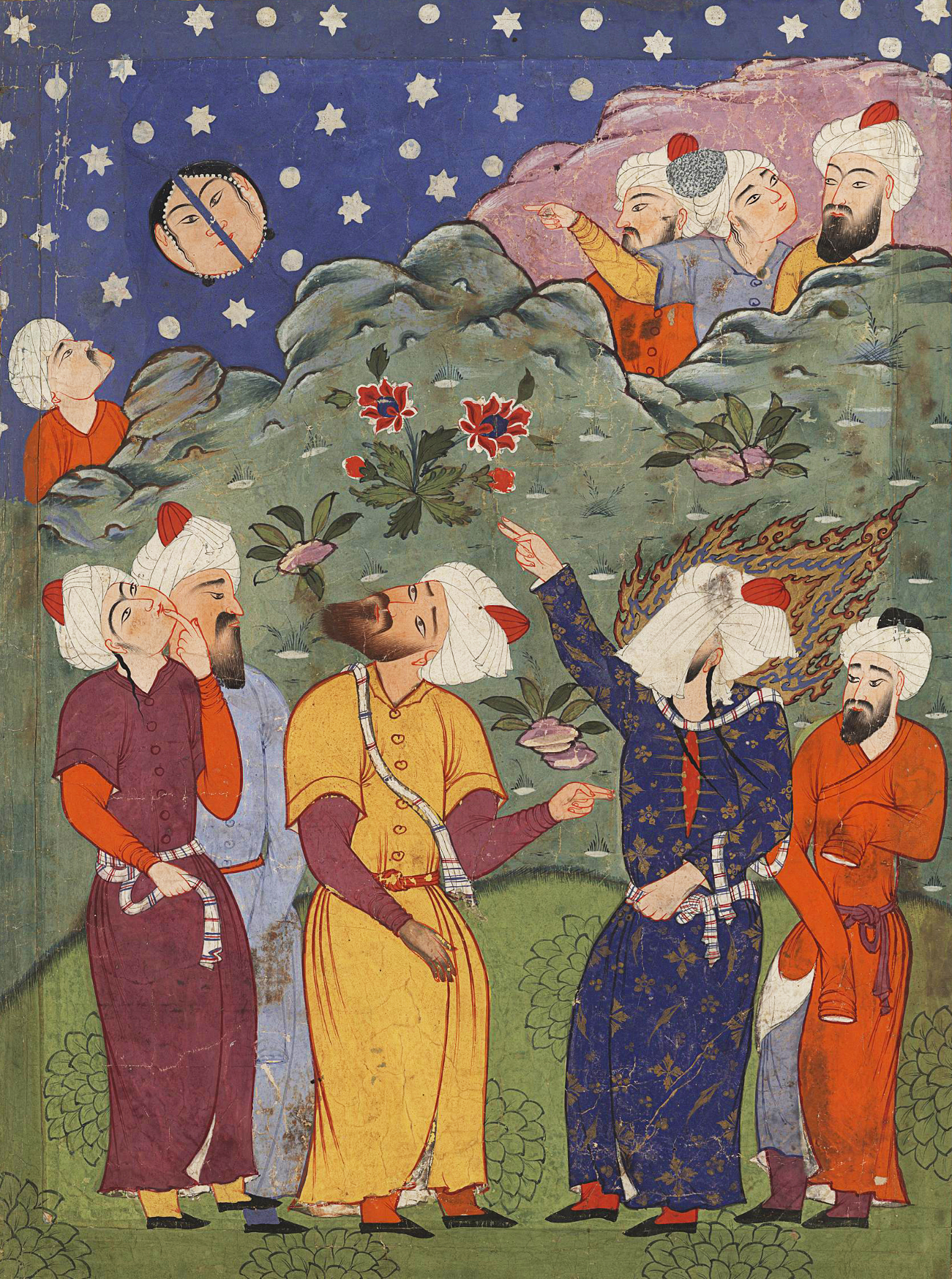
Artist unknown, Mohammed Splits the Moon, 16th century (Persia, Safavid dynasty), Saxon State Library, Dresden, Germany.

==== Other Islamic scenes ====
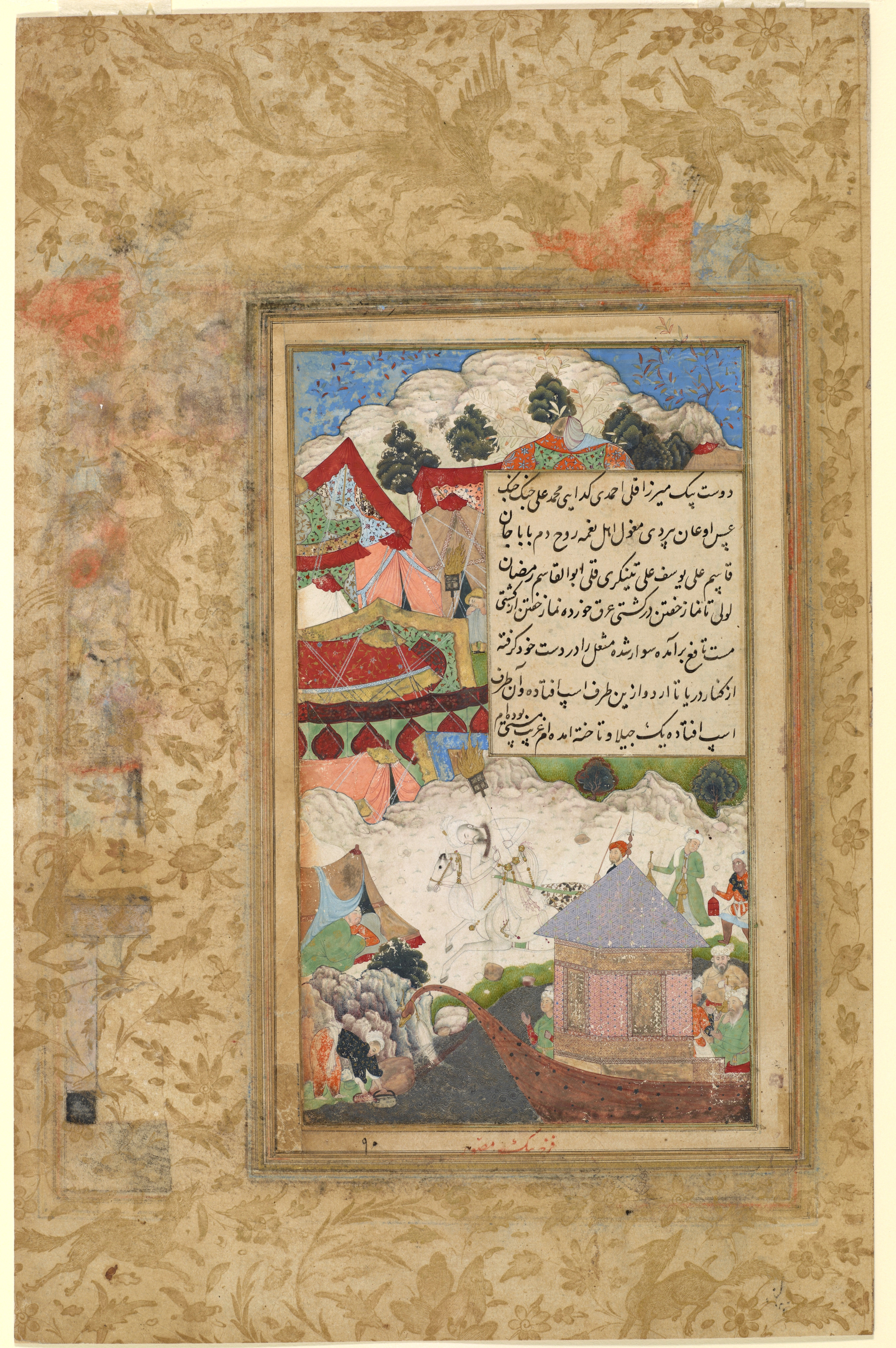
Farrukh Beg, A Drunken Babur Returns to Camp at Night after a boating party in celebration of the end of Ramadan ('id) in 1519, 1589 (Pakistan, Mughal), Lahore, Pakistan

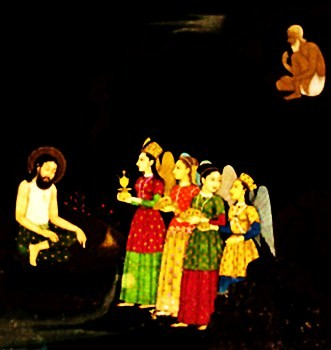
Ibrahim ibn Adham visited by Angels, 18th century (Middle East, Mughal miniature), Mughal Islamic art collection

=== Jainism ===
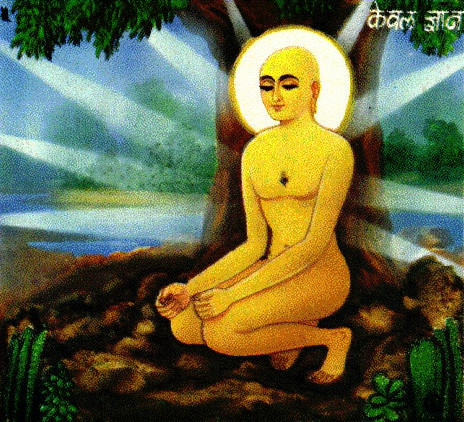
Kevala Jñāna of Mahavira

The painting Vigil on the Sixth Night after Mahavira's Birth depicts four women celebrating the birth of Mahavira's (599–527 BC) birth.

== Gallery ==
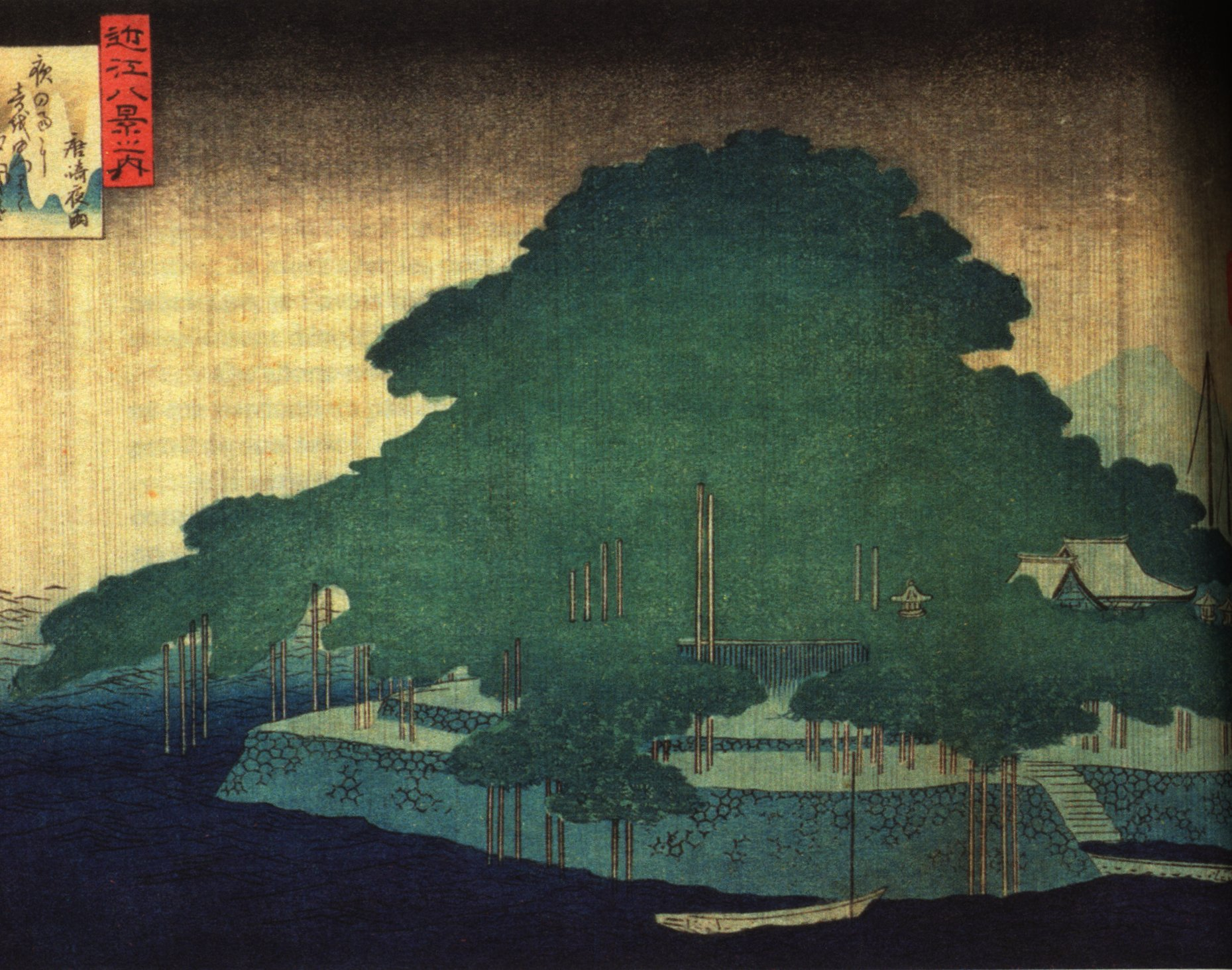
Hoeido et Eikyudo, Rainy night in Karasaki

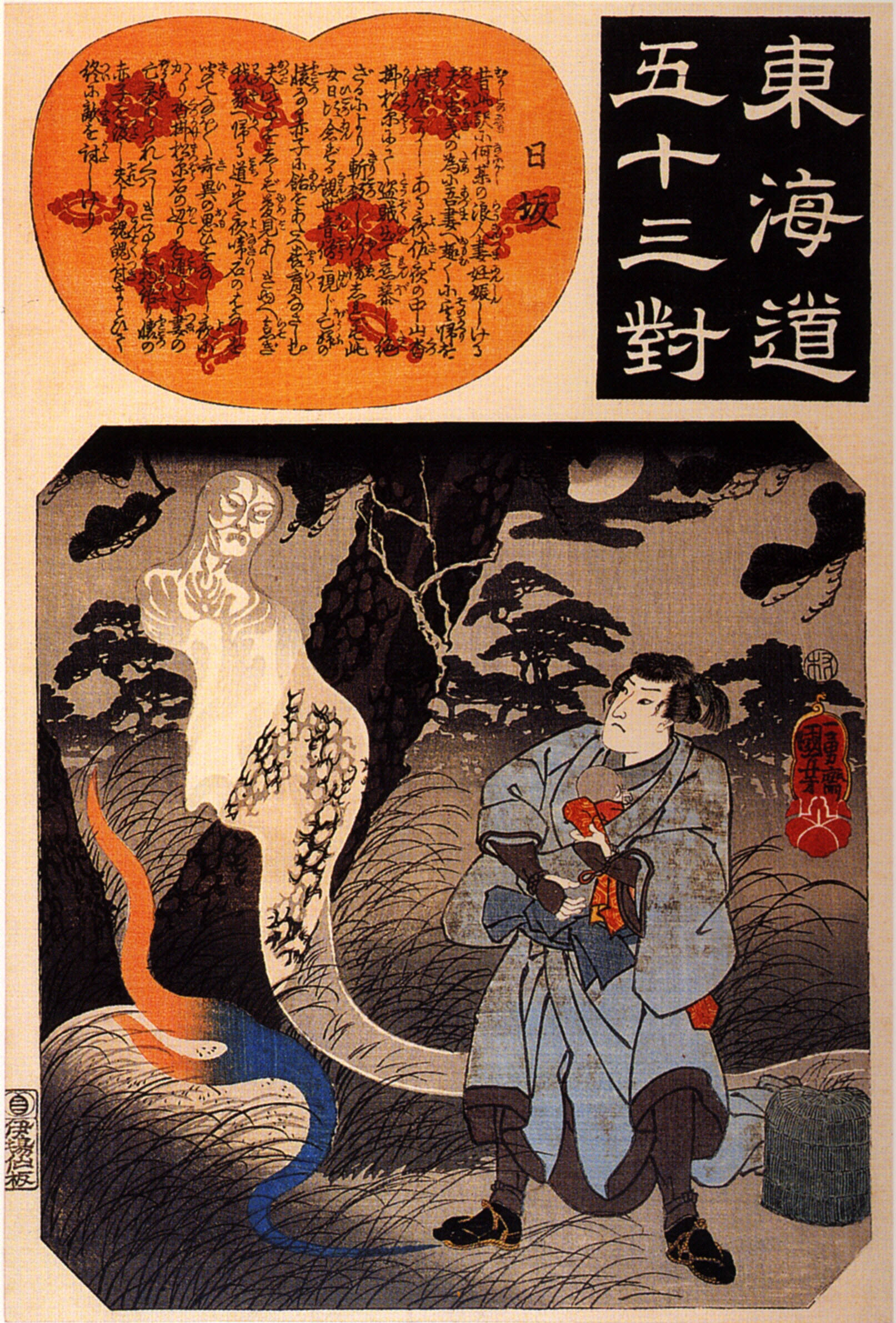
Utagawa Kuniyoshi, Nissaka, c. 1844

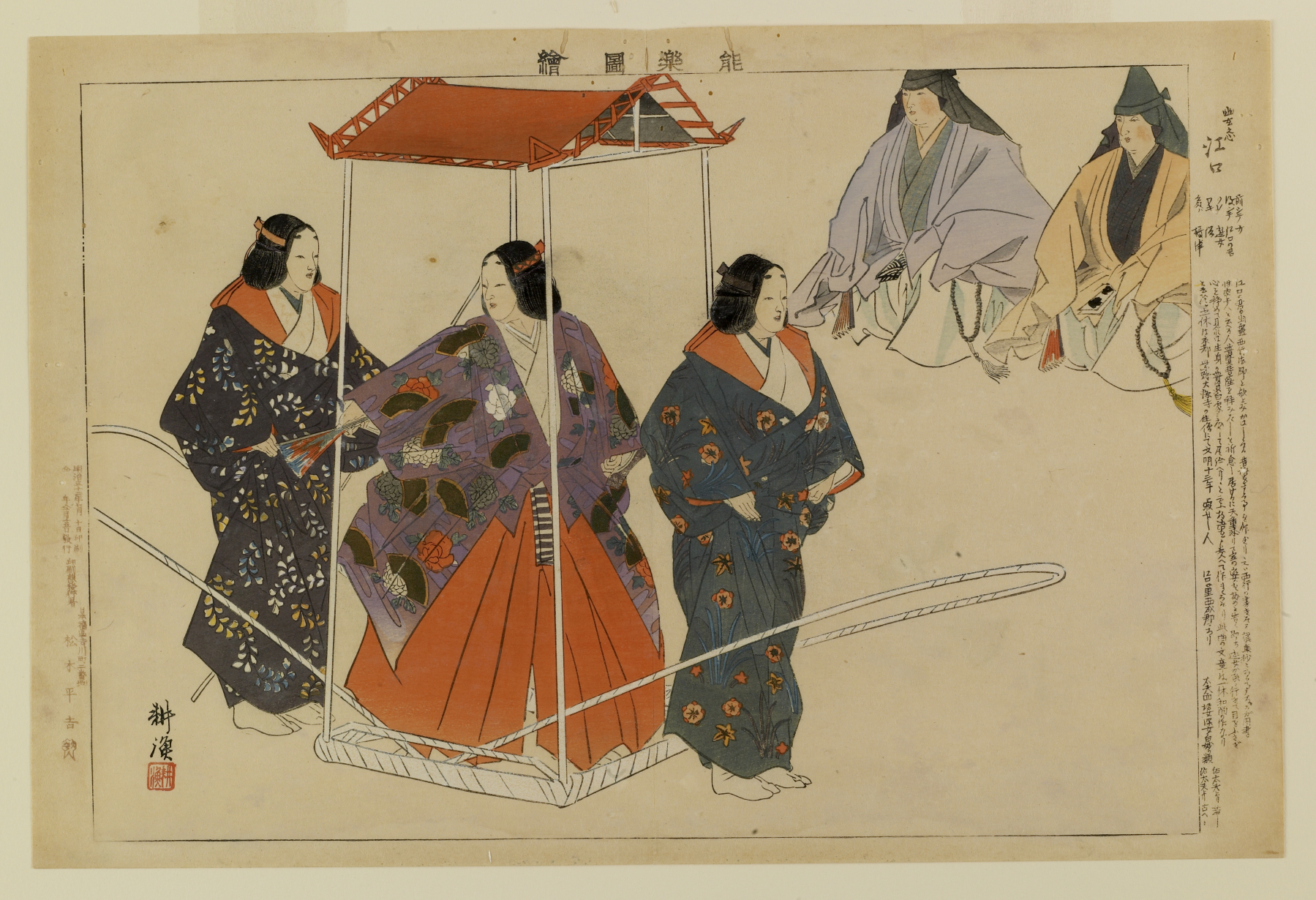
Kōgyo Tsukioka, Nogaku zue, 1899 (Meiji), Walters Art Museum

== See also ==
- History of Asian art
- History of painting
- Night photography
