= Night in paintings =

Night in paintings may refer to:

- Night in paintings (Western art)
- Night in paintings (Eastern art)
