= Zhang Chengye =

Chinese official of Former Jin (846–922)

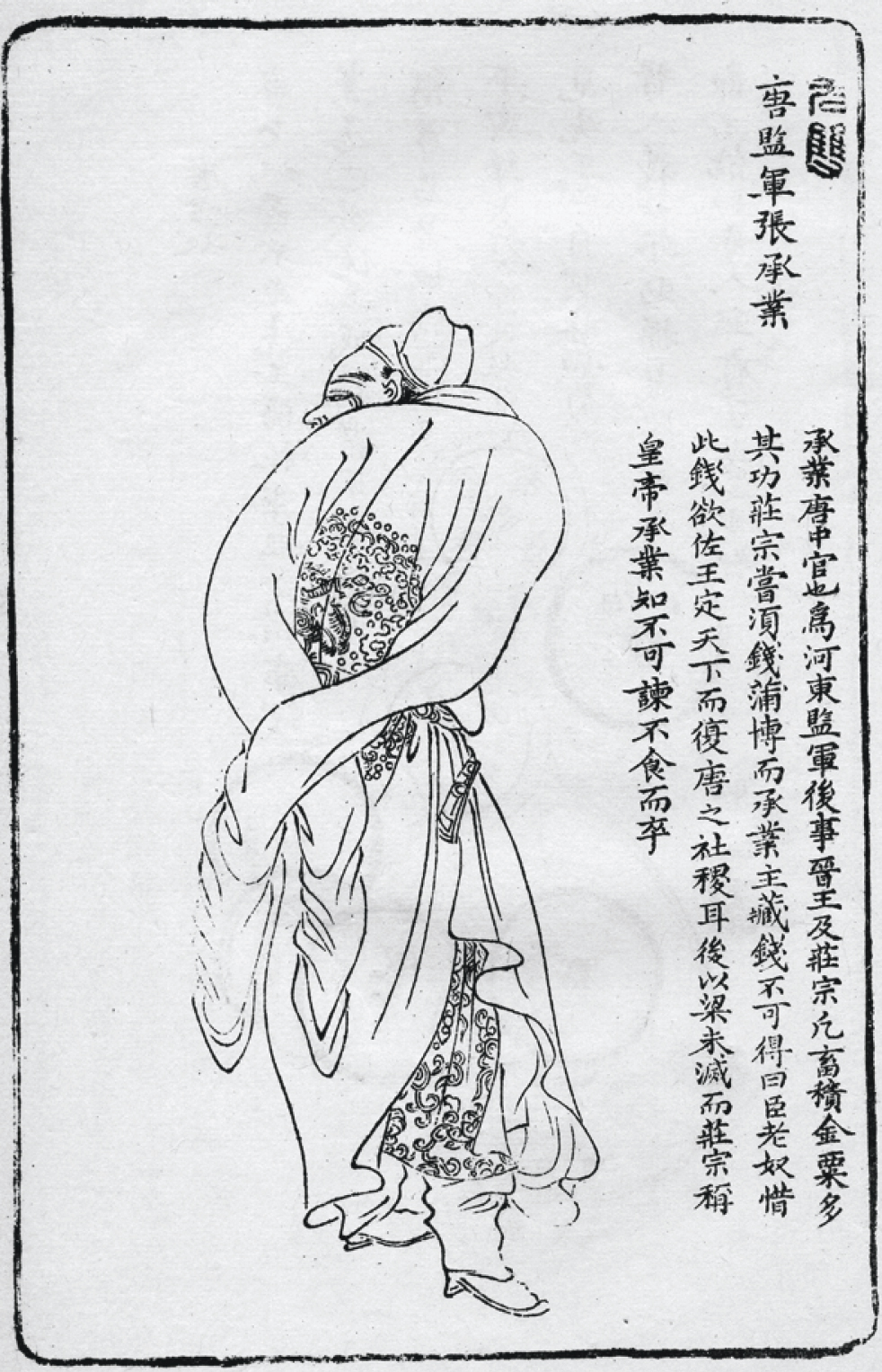
Zhang Chengye as depicted in the Wushuang Pu (無雙譜, preface 1690) by Jin Guliang

Zhang Chengye (Chinese: 張承業) (846 – November 23, 922), né Kang (康), courtesy name Jiyuan (繼元), posthumous name Zhengxian (正憲), was a Chinese government official and eunuch. He originally served the Tang dynasty, but later became an important advisor to Former Jin princes Li Keyong and his successor Li Cunxu, who would later establish the Later Tang dynasty.

== Background ==
Zhang Chengye was born in 846, the year that Emperor Xuānzong of Tang took the throne. He was originally surnamed Kang, although it was not known whether he then carried the name of Chengye. He was from Tong Prefecture (同州, in modern Weinan, Shaanxi). He was castrated in his childhood, and he became an adoptive son of the eunuch Zhang Tai (張泰); he thus took the name of Zhang.

== Service during Tang ==
During the Guangqi era (885–888) of Emperor Xuānzong's grandson Emperor Xizong, Zhang Chengye became the overseer of Heyang Base (郃陽鎮, in modern Weinan), which was controlled by the eunuch-commanded Shence Armies. He was later recalled to the palace to be an attending eunuch. During the reign of Emperor Xizong's brother and successor Emperor Zhaozong, Zhang was frequently sent as an emissary to the major warlord Li Keyong the military governor of Hedong Circuit (河東, headquartered in modern Taiyuan, Shanxi) and became friendly with Li Keyong. During Li Keyong's campaign against Wang Xingyu the military governor of Jingnan Circuit (靜難, headquartered in modern Xianyang, Shaanxi) and Li Maozhen the military governor of Fengxiang Circuit (鳳翔, headquartered in modern Baoji, Shaanxi) in 895 after Wang and Li Maozhen had marched on the imperial capital Chang'an and killed the chancellors Li Xi and Wei Zhaodu despite Emperor Zhaozong's protestations, Emperor Zhaozong had Zhang serve as the eunuch monitor of Li Keyong's army. After Li Keyong's victory over Wang later in the year, Zhang was made the director of the imperial winery. Subsequently, in 896, when Li Maozhen marched on Chang'an again and Emperor Zhaozong contemplated fleeing to Hedong, he sent Zhang to Hedong Circuit to serve permanently as eunuch monitor and to request Li Keyong to launch an army to save the imperial government. However, Emperor Zhaozong subsequently chose to flee to Zhenguo Circuit (鎮國, headquartered in modern Weinan), then-ruled by the military governor Han Jian instead. While Emperor Zhaozong was at Zhenguo's capital Hua Prefecture (華州), Zhang received a title as a general of the Left Shence Army.

Later, Li Keyong's military strengths were greatly decreased, and his archenemy Zhu Quanzhong the military governor of Xuanwu Circuit (宣武, headquartered in modern Kaifeng, Henan) was the strongest warlord of the land, such that Zhu was even able to put Hedong's capital Taiyuan Municipality under siege in 901 and nearly captured it. Zhu was allied with the chancellor Cui Yin, and in 901, when the powerful eunuchs at court, led by Han Quanhui, believed that Emperor Zhaozong and Cui were about to slaughter them, they seized Emperor Zhaozong and forcibly took him to Fengxiang, as they were allied with Li Maozhen. Zhu, at Cui's instigation, subsequently put Fengxiang's capital Fengxiang Municipality under siege. By 902, Fengxiang was in desperate straits, with the people resorting to cannibalism. Han had Emperor Zhaozong issue an edict calling for the regional governors to all attack Zhu, and Zhang, as the eunuch monitor of Hedong, advocated that Li Keyong launch an army to aid Fengxiang. Li Keyong agreed, but shortly after he launched his army in spring 903 to attack Jin Prefecture (晉州, in modern Linfen, Shanxi), he heard that Li Maozhen had already capitulated and turned the emperor over to Zhu, so he withdrew. Meanwhile, shortly after Li Maozhen turned over the emperor, Emperor Zhaozong, under the advocacy of Cui and Zhu, issued an edict ordering a general slaughter of all eunuchs. Li Keyong did not want to directly disobey the edict, but wanted to save Zhang, so he hid Zhang at Hulü Temple (斛律寺), while executing a condemned criminal in his stead. In 904, after Zhu had forcibly moved Emperor Zhaozong to the eastern capital Luoyang and then assassinated Emperor Zhaozong, Li Keyong publicly restored Zhang as the eunuch monitor.

== Service during Jin ==
In 907, Zhu Quanzhong forced Emperor Zhaozong’s successor Emperor Ai of Tang to yield the throne to him, ending Tang and starting a new Later Liang with him as its Emperor Taizu. Li Keyong, who then carried the Tang-bestowed title of Prince of Jin, refused to recognize the Later Liang emperor and continued to use the Tang era name of Tianyou, but became effectively the sovereign of his own state of Jin. (Li Maozhen, carrying the title of Prince of Qi, and Yang Wo, carrying the title of Prince of Hongnong (later known as Wu), were two other major regional warlords who also continued to use the Tang era name of Tianyou; another warlord, Wang Jian the Prince of Shu, soon claimed imperial title himself, establishing Former Shu.) Zhang Chengye, still using Tang-bestowed titles as well, continued to serve Li Keyong.

In spring 908, Li Keyong became gravely ill. He entrusted his son and heir Li Cunxu to his brother Li Kening, Zhang, officers Li Cunzhang (an adoptive son of Li Keyong's) and Wu Gong (吳珙), and secretary Lu Zhi (盧質), and then died. They supported Li Cunxu to succeed Li Keyong as the Prince of Jin and the military governor of Hedong. However, soon thereafter, Li Keyong's adoptive son Li Cunhao (李存顥) encouraged Li Kening, who was having policy disagreements with Zhang and Li Cunzhang, to seize the position for himself, and Li Kening agreed, planning to seize Li Cunxu and kill Zhang and Li Cunzhang, and then submit to Later Liang. When Li Cunxu found this out, he conferred with Zhang, Li Cunzhang, Wu, Li Cunjing (李存敬, another adoptive son of Li Keyong's), and Zhu Shouyin and formulated a plan to counter it. They preemptively arrested and executed Li Kening and Li Cunhao, affirming Li Cunxu's hold on the throne.

One decision Li Cunxu had to make immediately was how or whether to try to aid his cousin Li Sizhao the military governor of Zhaoyi Circuit (昭義, headquartered in modern Changzhi, Shanxi), who was then under siege at Zhaoyi's capital Lu Prefecture (潞州) by a large Later Liang army. Li Cunxu himself was intending on going to aid Li Sizhao himself, and Zhang supported him in this decision. Li Cunxu, in addition to gathering all of his own troops, also sent Zhang and Wang Jian (王緘, note not the same person as the Former Shu emperor) to Qi to seek Li Maozhen's aid. (Li Maozhen, however, lacked strengths to launch an aid army and therefore did not.) After the victory, Li Cunxu entrusted much of the governance of the circuit to Zhang, honoring him as an elder brother and often visiting his mansion to pay tribute to his mother.

Later in 908, Qi and Former Shu forces launched a joint attack on Later Liang, intending to capture Chang'an. Jin also launched an army, commanded by Zhang, to try to aid the Qi/Former Shu attack by diverting Later Liang forces. However, after the Later Liang generals Liu Zhijun and Wang Chongshi (王重師) defeated Qi troops, all three states withdrew.

In late 910, when Li Cunxu launched an army to aid his new ally Wang Rong the Prince of Zhao (previously a Later Liang vassal) against a Later Liang attack, as the Jin army approached the Later Liang army under the command of the general Wang Jingren, the Jin general Zhou Dewei urged caution due to the Later Liang advantage in numbers that would overwhelm Jin forces near the hills (where the two armies were at the time); he advocated trying to draw the Later Liang army into open plains (where Jin's cavalry mobility would be an advantage) before engaging Later Liang troops, but Li Cunxu initially did not heed his warnings. Zhou went to see Zhang and persuaded him, and it was Zhang who intruded into Li Cunxu's tent during sleep to convince him to listen to Zhou. He thus retreated to draw Wang Jingren onto the plains (as Zhou suggested), allowing him to defeat Wang Jingren early in 911 and save Zhao. After the victory, Li Cunxu marched south, initially attending to seize more Later Liang territory; he assigned Zhang and Li Cunzhang the task of sieging Xing Prefecture (邢州, in modern Xingtai, Hebei), although he soon stopped the attack to concentrate on his subsequent campaign against Liu Shouguang, who had declared himself the emperor of a new state of Yan. (At Zhang's suggestion, Li Cunxu even sent an emissary to congratulate Liu, in order to get him to believe that the Jin prince was fearful of him so that he would be unprepared for the coming Jin attack.)

In spring 912, the Jin attack against Yan got underway, with Zhou commanding the Jin army in a joint operation with the Zhao general Wang Deming (Wang Rong's adoptive son) and the Yiwu Circuit (義武, headquartered in modern Baoding, Hebei) army commanded by Cheng Yan (程巖) (whose military governor, Wang Chuzhi, was also a Jin ally). Zhou won victory after victory against Yan, and by spring 913 was putting Yan's capital You Prefecture (幽州, in modern Beijing) under siege after capturing nearly every other Yan city. When Li Cunxu sent Zhang to the front to consult with Zhou on the next step, Liu sent an emissary to Zhang, offering to surrender, but Zhang, citing his past record of turning against his own promises, refused to accept his surrender. After Zhang returned to Li Cunxu's headquarters, Li Cunxu left Zhang in charge there and himself headed for You Prefecture — where he initially agreed to accept Liu's surrender, offering to spare Liu's life, but after Liu reneged, renewed the siege. You Prefecture fell, and Liu, after initially fleeing, was captured, ending Yan and allowing Jin to seize its territory.

Over the years, during Li Cunxu's campaigns, Zhang was in charge of governing the people and overseeing the financial welfare of the state. It was said that he encouraged farming and frugality. He also was in charge of purchasing and manufacturing weapons, acquiring horses, collecting taxes, and enforcing laws fairly. When Li Cunxu wanted to spend money frivolously for gambling or games, he would refuse to approve the expenditures — leading to a confrontation in 917 during a feast where, Li Cunxu, then drunk, threatened to kill Zhang. When Li Cunxu's mother Lady Dowager Cao heard what was happening, she immediately sent a messenger to summon Li Cunxu to her mansion; by this point, Li Cunxu was also regretting what he was doing, and tried to apologize to Zhang, but Zhang would initially not accept the apology. After Li Cunxu went to see Lady Dowager Cao, she sent a messenger to apologize to Zhang, stating, "My young son has offended the Tejin [(特進, the Tang title that Zhang carried)]. I have already whipped him for this offense." The next day, she took Li Cunxu to see Zhang to apologize to him. Zhang continued to serve Li Cunxu. However, when Li Cunxu subsequently, in the name of the Tang emperor, bestow the greater titles of Kaifu Yitong Sansi (開府儀同三司), general of the imperial guards, and the Duke of Yan on Zhang, Zhang refused those titles, and for the rest of his life continued to use only titles actually granted to him during Tang. It was said that it was through Zhang's efforts that Lu Zhi, who several times offended Li Cunxu's brothers, was not punished.

By 921, with repeated victories over Later Liang (then ruled by Emperor Taizu's son and successor Zhu Zhen) and with his having discovered the Tang imperial seal — which had been lost decades earlier during Huang Chao's rebellion — Li Cunxu began considering claiming imperial title. When Zhang heard this, he went from Jin's capital Taiyuan Municipality to Li Cunxu's then-location at Wei Prefecture (魏州, in modern Handan, Hebei) to try to dissuade him, pointing out that Jin's public appeal had been for the reestablishment of Tang, and that the appeal would be lost if Li Cunxu himself took the throne:

You, my Prince, has for generations been faithful to the Tang imperial house, so this old slave of yours has spent more than 30 years gathering wealth and collecting soldiers and horses for you, Prince, swearing to destroy the treasonous bandit and reestablish our dynasty's ancestral temples. You have just settled the region north of the Yellow River, and the Zhus still exist. For you, Prince, to take the throne, would be contrary to what you have intended, and the state would collapse. Why do you, Prince, not first destroy the Zhus to avenge the emperors, and then find a suitable Tang descendant to be emperor. You support him to destroy Wu to the south and Shu to the west, overrun the realm, and recombine them into one. Even then, even if Emperors Gaozu and Taizong [(the first two emperors of Tang, usually considered cofounders of the dynasty)] were alive again, would they dare to be above you? The more you refuse what you deserve, the firmer it will be when it comes to you. This old slave has no other desire other than to bring a foundation that would last 10,000 years for you, Prince, because of what grace the late Prince had shown me.

Li Cunxu continued to state that it was due to the generals' desires that he was considering taking the throne. Zhang, seeing that it was impossible to stop, cried bitterly and returned to Taiyuan. He grew ill there. He died in winter 922. Lady Dowager Cao visited his mansion and wore mourning clothes as if she were a daughter. After Li Cunxu eventually claimed imperial title to establish Later Tang, he posthumously honored Zhang and gave him the posthumous name Zhenxian (貞憲, honest and fair). Zhang Chengye is depicted in the Wu Shuang Pu (無雙譜, Table of Peerless Heroes) by Jin Guliang.

== Notes and references ==
- History of the Five Dynasties, vol. 72.
- New History of the Five Dynasties, vol. 38.
- Zizhi Tongjian, vols. 260, 262, 263, 264, 265, 266, 267, 268, 269, 270, 271.
