= 909 =

Calendar year

909 in various calendars
- Gregorian calendar: 909; CMIX
- Ab urbe condita: 1662
- Armenian calendar: 358; ԹՎ ՅԾԸ
- Assyrian calendar: 5659
- Balinese saka calendar: 830–831
- Bengali calendar: 315–316
- Berber calendar: 1859
- Buddhist calendar: 1453
- Burmese calendar: 271
- Byzantine calendar: 6417–6418
- Chinese calendar: 戊辰年 (Earth Dragon); 3606 or 3399 — to — 己巳年 (Earth Snake); 3607 or 3400
- Coptic calendar: 625–626
- Discordian calendar: 2075
- Ethiopian calendar: 901–902
- Hebrew calendar: 4669–4670
- Hindu calendars
- Vikram Samvat: 965–966
- Shaka Samvat: 830–831
- Kali Yuga: 4009–4010
- Holocene calendar: 10909
- Iranian calendar: 287–288
- Islamic calendar: 296–297
- Japanese calendar: Engi 9 (延喜９年)
- Javanese calendar: 808–809
- Julian calendar: 909; CMIX
- Korean calendar: 3242
- Minguo calendar: 1003 before ROC 民前1003年
- Nanakshahi calendar: −559
- Seleucid era: 1220/1221 AG
- Thai solar calendar: 1451–1452
- Tibetan calendar: ས་ཕོ་འབྲུག་ལོ་ (male Earth-Dragon); 1035 or 654 or −118 — to — ས་མོ་སྦྲུལ་ལོ་ (female Earth-Snake); 1036 or 655 or −117

Year 909 (CMIX) was a common year starting on Sunday of the Julian calendar. It was the 909th year of the Common Era (CE) and Anno Domini (AD) designations, the 909th year of the 1st millennium, the 9th year of the 10th century, and the 10th and last year of the 900s decade.

== Events ==
=== By place ===
==== Britain ====
- King Edward the Elder and his sister, Princess Æthelflæd of Mercia, raid Danish East Anglia and bring back the relics of St. Oswald in triumph. Æthelflæd translates them to the new minster in Gloucester, which is renamed St. Oswald's Priory in his honour.
- Edward the Elder despatches an Anglo-Saxon army to attack the Northumbrian Vikings, and ravages Scandinavian York.

==== Africa ====
- March 18 – The Fatimid Dynasty founded by Shiite Muslims in Ifriqiya (modern Tunisia) gains suzerainty over the Aghlabid Dynasty in North Africa. Emir Ziyadat Allah III escapes to the Near East, unable to secure any help from the Abbasid Caliphate to regain his emirate.
- The Berber Kutama tribesmen under Abdullah al-Mahdi Billah capture the cities of Kairouan and Raqqada. The capital city of the Rustamid imamate, Tihert is destroyed. The remaining Ibadi are forced into the desert.
- Winter – Abdullah al-Mahdi Billah takes up the leadership of the Fatimid state and proclaims himself Caliph Abdullah (al-Mahdi).

==== China ====
- April 27 – The Min Kingdom (modern-day Fujian province) is established by governor Wang Shenzhi (Prince of Langye), with Fuzhou (known as Changle) as its capital. Wang Shenzhi tries to attract scholars who will help to construct an efficient bureaucracy and tax system.
- Battle of Jisu: The warlord brothers Liu Shouguang and Liu Shouwen fight with Liu Shouguang, emerging victorious.

==== Mesoamerica ====
- The last Long Count date is inscribed on a monument at the Mayan site of Toniná (modern-day Chiapas, Mexico), marking the end of the Classic Maya Period.

=== By topic ===
==== Religion ====
- Asser, bishop of Sherborne, dies. His See is divided, there are new Bishoprics created at Wells, Crediton, Ramsbury and Sonning.

== Births ==
- Æthelwold, bishop of Winchester (or 904)
- December – Ar-Radi, Abbasid caliph (d. 940)
- Dunstan, archbishop of Canterbury (d. 988)
- Fujiwara no Morosuke, Japanese statesman (d. 960)
- Shen Lun, Chinese scholar-official (d. 987)
- Thomais of Lesbos, Byzantine saint (d. ca. 947)

== Deaths ==
- April 18 – Dionysius II, Syriac Orthodox patriarch of Antioch
- May 9 – Adalgar, archbishop of Bremen
- Aribo of Austria, Frankish margrave
- Asser, bishop of Sherborne (approximate date)
- Cadell ap Rhodri, king of Seisyllwg (Wales)
- Cerball mac Muirecáin, king of Leinster (Ireland)
- Fujiwara no Tokihira, Japanese statesman (b. 871)
- Gerald of Aurillac, Frankish nobleman (b. 855)
- Luo Yin, Chinese statesman and poet (b. 833)
- Muhammad ibn Dawud al-Zahiri, Muslim theologian (b. 868)
- Sochlachan mac Diarmata, king of Uí Maine (Ireland)
- Wighelm, bishop of Selsey
