= Lu Wenjin =

Lu Wenjin (盧文進) (died 944), courtesy name Guoyong (國用) (per the History of the Five Dynasties) or Dayong (大用) (per the New History of the Five Dynasties), formally the Prince of Fanyang (范陽王), was a general of the Chinese Five Dynasties and Ten Kingdoms Period states Yan, Jin, Jin's successor state Later Tang, Wu, and Wu's successor state Southern Tang, as well as the Khitan Empire. He had, early in his career, defected to Khitan and was instrumental in building Khitan's strategies of periodic incursions into Chinese territory, but later redefected to Later Tang. When Later Tang was overthrown by the Khitan-supported Later Jin, Lu, in fear, fled to Wu, and remained at Wu and then Southern Tang for the rest of his life.

== Background ==
It is not known when Lu Wenjin was born, but it is known that he was from Fanyang. He was said to be tall and impressive in his appearance, and known for eating and drinking far more than ordinary men. In his youth, he came to serve under the warlord Liu Shouguang, who controlled the region and who would later declare himself the emperor of a state of Yan, as a general of the cavalry.

== During Jin ==
In 913, when Li Cunxu the Prince of Jin attacked Yan, Lu Wenjin surrendered to Jin, and, because he surrendered early, was given the title of prefect of Shou Prefecture (壽州, in modern Lu'an, Anhui) — purely an honorary post as Jin did not then control that region. Li Cunxu assigned Lu to serve under his younger brother Li Cunju (李存矩) the military prefect of Xin Prefecture (新州, in modern Zhangjiakou, Hebei).

As of 917, by which time Li Cunxu had conquered Yan, he was locked into a lengthy campaign with Jin's archrival Later Liang. That year, he ordered Li Cunju to collect the talented soldiers of the region north of the Taihang Mountains and the deserters from the Yan army to deliver them to the Jin-Later Liang front; he also ordered a conscription of horses from the region, which alienated the people. Li Cunju gathered up 500 horses and cavalry soldiers, and decided to personally deliver them south to Li Cunxu, with Lu assisting him. The soldiers were fearful of the dangerous fighting ahead of them, but Li Cunju did not pay heed and did not comfort them. When they reached Qigo Pass (祁溝關, in modern Baoding, Hebei), the officer Gong Yanzhang (宮彥璋) persuaded the soldiers to mutiny, and they killed Li Cunju. They offered the command to Lu, who, after mourning Li Cunju and stating, "These slaves murdered the young master. How can I ever see the Prince again?" accepted. (However, it was also believed that Lu was complicit, as he had resented Li Cunju for forcing him to give his beautiful daughter to Li Cunju to be a concubine.) They returned to Xin Prefecture, but the defender of the city, Yang Quanzhang (楊全章), refused to let them. Lu then attacked Wu Prefecture (武州, in modern Zhangjiakou), but was repelled by the general Li Sigong (李嗣肱). When the major general Zhou Dewei the military governor (Jiedushi) of Lulong Circuit (盧龍, headquartered at Fanyang) also launched an army against Lu, Lu was forced to flee to the territory of Khitan Empire and submit to Khitan's Emperor Taizu.

== In Khitan Empire ==
Soon thereafter, with Lu Wenjin as their guide, the Khitan army launched a major attack on Jin's northern borders, quickly capturing Xin Prefecture. Lu made his subordinate Liu Yin (劉殷) its prefect. When, under Li Cunxu's orders, Zhou Dewei then came to attack Xin with his own Lulong army, reinforced by armies of Jin's Hedong (河東, headquartered in modern Taiyuan, Shanxi), as well as the armies of Jin's allies Zhao and Yiwu Circuit (義武, headquartered in modern Baoding), Zhou was defeated by a massive (300,000 men) Khitan army, and was forced to withdraw back to Lulong's capital You Prefecture (幽州, i.e., Fanyang), which, under advice from Lu, the Khitan army put him under siege. While a subsequent Jin army, commanded by the major generals Li Siyuan, Yan Bao (閻寶), and Li Cunshen, were able to lift the siege and force a Khitan retreat, the Lulong/Khitan boundary had been left vulnerable. Emperor Taizu thereafter gave Lu the title of military governor of Lulong as well, stationing him and his ethnic Han soldiers at Ping Prefecture (平州, in modern Qinhuangdao, Hebei). Each year, he would guide Khitan's ethnic Xi soldiers on incursions into Jin territory, as well as on the more major attacks on Jin. The food shipments to Lulong were often pillaged by the Khitan forces, leaving Lulong's prefectures in distress.

In 921, Zhao's prince Wang Rong was assassinated by his adoptive son Wang Deming, who took over the Zhao territories and reassumed his birth name of Zhang Wenli. While Li Cunxu initially tried to placate him by commissioning him as the acting military governor of Chengde Circuit (成德, i.e., Zhao territory), Zhang became convinced that Li Cunxu would eventually attack him. He thus sought aid from both Later Liang (whose emperor, Zhu Zhen, declined) and Khitan, through Lu. When Li Cunxu thereafter did, as anticipated, announce a general campaign against Zhang, Emperor Taizu launched a major attack south. However, when Li Cunxu himself engaged the Khitan army in spring 922 and defeated them, Emperor Taizu, stating to Lu, "Heaven did not intend for me to come here," and withdrew. Later in the year, with the Khitan army repelled, Chengde's capital Zhen Prefecture (鎮州, in modern Shijiazhuang, Hebei), fell. Zhang's son Zhang Chujin (who had taken over after Zhang died shortly after the Jin campaign against him began) was executed, and Jin took over Chengde.

After this failed campaign, Lu and another Han officer who surrendered to Khitan, Wang Yu (王郁), returned to their routines of guiding Khitan soldiers in harassing Jin's northern borders, causing much worries for Li Cunxu in his resumed campaign against Later Liang. Despite this and other difficulties, however, he was able to capture Later Liang's capital Daliang in a surprise attack in 923. Zhu committed suicide as Daliang fell, ending Later Liang and allowing Li Cunxu to take over its territory as the emperor of a new Later Tang. In light of the Later Tang victory, Khitan did not relent in its pressure, and continued yearly raids against Later Tang, and further demanded that Li Cunxu cede Lulong so that it could be given to Lu; Li Cunxu refused. When Emperor Taizu later that year decided to try to conquer Khitan's eastern neighbor Balhae, he left Lu and the Xi chieftain Tunei (禿餒) on guard on the Later Tang borders to ward against a potential Later Tang attack, although he was unable to conquer Balhae at that time. (He was eventually able to in 926, and bestowed Balhae lands on his oldest son Yelü Bei.)

== During Later Tang ==
In 926, Li Cunxu was killed in a mutiny at then-Later Tang capital Luoyang. Li Siyuan, who had earlier rebelled against him, quickly arrived at Luoyang and claimed the imperial title (as he was an adoptive brother of Li Cunxu's). Shortly after, he began to send secret emissaries to Lu Wenjin, trying to persuade him to defect back — pointing out that with a new Later Tang regime, the past hatred for Lu's killing of Li Cunju was gone. Lu's own soldiers, predominantly Han, wanted him to do so, and he thereafter killed the commander of the Khitan garrison (sent to assist him) and took his army (described to be about 100,000 men in strength with 8,000 wagons) to You Prefecture to submit to Later Tang. Li Siyuan made him the military governor of Yicheng Circuit (義成, headquartered in modern Anyang, Henan) and gave him the honorary chancellor title of Tong Zhongshu Menxia Pingzhangshi (同中書門下平章事). About a year later, he was moved to Weisheng Circuit (威勝, headquartered in modern Nanyang, Henan), and later recalled to the imperial government to serve as a general of the imperial guards. Yet later in Li Siyuan's reign (during the Changxing era (930-933)), he was made the military governor of Zhaoyi Circuit (昭義, headquartered in modern Changzhi, Shanxi). Later, during the Qingtai era of Li Siyuan's adoptive son and successor Li Congke (934-936), he served as the military governor of Anyuan Circuit (安遠, headquartered in modern Xiaogan, Hebei).

== During Wu/Southern Tang ==
In 936, Li Congke's brother-in-law (Li Siyuan's son-in-law) Shi Jingtang, then the military governor of Hedong, rebelled against Li Congke and, with aid from Khitan's Emperor Taizong (Emperor Taizu's son and successor), defeated the Later Tang army sent against him. Li Congke committed suicide with his family, and Shi established Later Jin to replace it. Lu Wenjin, hearing of the news, became fearful, as he had himself rebelled against Khitan, and therefore decided to abandon his post and flee to Wu. As he passed through each garrison, he entered and informed its commander the reasons for his flight; those commanders, respecting his decision, bowed to him and allowed him to proceed to Wu.

Upon Lu's arrival at the Wu court, the Wu regent Xu Zhigao greatly honored him, and Wu's emperor Yang Pu made him the military governor of Ningguo Circuit (寧國, headquartered in modern Xuancheng, Anhui). He later served as the military governor of Zhenhai Circuit (鎮海, headquartered in modern Zhenjiang, Jiangsu). Yet later — by which point Xu had seized the Wu throne, established Southern Tang, and changed his name to Li Bian — Lu was recalled to the Southern Tang court to serve as a general of the imperial guards; he was also given the honorary chancellor title of Zhongshu Ling (中書令) and created the Prince of Fanyang. It was said that Lu, during this time, was respectful to others and welcomed guests, but only talked about civilian matters, not military matters. For reasons unknown, he developed a rivalry with the official Feng Yanji. After his death in 944, by which time Li Bian's son Li Jing was emperor, Feng made false accusations against Lu and wanted to confiscate not only his property, but his household as well. His assistant Gao Yue (高越), who was also his son-in-law, submitted a petition rebutting Feng's charges. While Gao was subsequently exiled as a result, Feng's accusations against Lu also stopped, causing his household to be spared.

== Notes and references ==
- History of the Five Dynasties, vol. 97.
- New History of the Five Dynasties, vol. 48.
- Spring and Autumn Annals of the Ten Kingdoms, vol. 24.
- Zizhi Tongjian, vols. 268, 269, 270, 271, 272, 273, 275, 276, 280, 281.
