= Zhou Dewei =

Chinese general

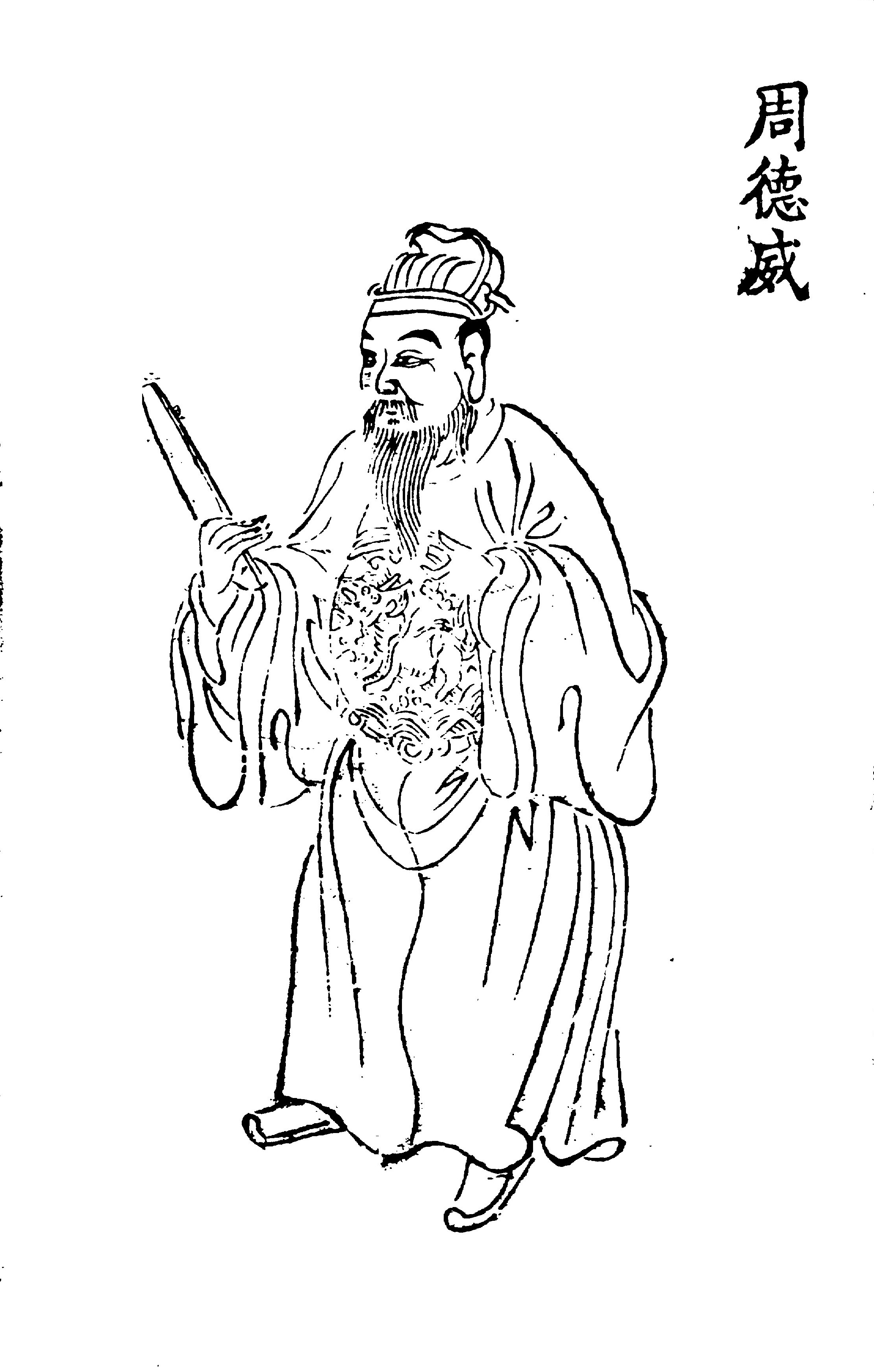
Zhou Dewei

Zhou Dewei (周德威) (died January 28, 919), courtesy name Zhenyuan (鎮遠), nickname Yangwu (陽五), was a Chinese military general and politician of the Chinese Five Dynasties and Ten Kingdoms period state Jin (predecessor state to Later Tang).

== Service under Li Keyong ==
It is not known when Zhou Dewei was born, but it is known that he was from Mayi (馬邑, in modern Shuozhou, Shanxi). He started his service in the late Tang dynasty under Li Keyong the military governor of Hedong Circuit (河東, headquartered in modern Taiyuan, Shanxi) as a cavalry officer. He was said to be brave, intelligent, and capable in horsemanship and archery. As he grew up on the northern border, it was said that he gained the experience of watching the dust clouds created by cavalry and being able to judge the strength of the force that was proceeding. During the Qianning era (894–898) of Emperor Zhaozong of Tang, he became the commander of Tielin Base (鐵林軍). During Li Keyong's campaign against Wang Xingyu the military governor of Jingnan Circuit (靜難, headquartered in modern Xianyang, Shaanxi), Zhou had accomplishments and was made the deputy commander of Li Keyong's headquarter guard corps.

Later in 898, when Li Keyong sent his adoptive nephew Li Sizhao and Zhou to try to recover three prefectures east of the Taihang Mountains that he had previously lost to his archenemy Zhu Quanzhong the military governor of Xuanwu Circuit (宣武, headquartered in modern Kaifeng, Henan) (Xing (邢州, in modern Xingtai, Hebei), Ci (磁州, in modern Handan, Hebei), and Ming (洺州, also in modern Handan)). However, they were defeated by Zhu's general Ge Congzhou, who subsequently cut off their escape path back into the Taihang. It was due to the effort of Li Keyong's adoptive son Li Siyuan in fighting through Ge's blockade that the Hedong army was able to escape.

In 899, Ge tried to attack Hedong's main territory, and his deputy Shi Shucong (氏叔琮) advanced to Yuci (榆次, in modern Jinzhong, Shanxi). Li Keyong sent Zhou to try to repel Shi. Shi's forward commander, one Chen Zhang (陳章), claimed that he could capture Zhou, but Zhou, in a one-to-one confrontation, hammered Chen off his horse and captured him. Subsequently, his soldiers defeated Shi's soldiers, and Shi fled. Following Shi's defeat, Ge also withdrew.

In late 899, Zhu sent Ge to attack Liu Rengong the military governor of Lulong Circuit (盧龍, headquartered in modern Beijing), putting Liu's son Liu Shouwen the military governor of Yichang Circuit (義昌, headquartered in modern Cangzhou, Hebei) under siege at Yichang's capital Cang Prefecture (滄州). In spring 900, Li Keyong sent Zhou with a 5,000-men cavalry force, and then had Li Sizhao follow up with a 50,000-men force to attack Xing and Ming Prefectures to try to relieve the pressure on the Lius. Subsequently, though, Zhu recalled Ge, as Wang Rong the military governor of Chengde Circuit (成德, headquartered in modern Shijiazhuang, Hebei) mediated the dispute, and Ge's army was also itself stalled by rainstorms. By that point, Li Sizhao had captured Ming Prefecture. Zhu sent Ge against Li Sizhao, and subsequently arrived himself with reinforcements. Li Sizhao withdrew, but suffered substantial losses.

In spring 901, Xuanwu forces under Shi launched a major attack against Hedong, advancing all the way to Hedong's capital Taiyuan Municipality and put it under siege. The city almost fell, but eventually, with Xuanwu forces bogged down by rain and running out of food supplies, Zhu recalled Shi. As Shi was retreating, Zhou and Li Sizhao attacked him, inflicting losses. Later in the year, Li Keyong sent Li Sizhao and Zhou to capture Xi (隰州) and Ci (慈州, both in modern Linfen, Shanxi, not the same prefecture as the one east of the Taihang Mountains) Prefectures, which had become under Zhu's control when Zhu conquered Huguo Circuit (護國, headquartered in modern Yuncheng, Shanxi) earlier in 901.

Later in 901, the powerful eunuchs at the Tang imperial court at Chang'an, believing that then-reigning Emperor Zhaozong of Tang and the chancellor Cui Yin were able to slaughter them, forcibly seized Emperor Zhaozong and took him to Fengxiang Circuit (鳳翔, headquartered in modern Baoji, Shaanxi), then reigned by the eunuchs' ally Li Maozhen. Cui, who was allied with Zhu, summoned Zhu to attack Fengxiang. Li Maozhen wrote Li Keyong to request aid. Li Keyong sent Li Sizhao to attack Jin Prefecture (晉州, in modern Linfen), and Li Sizhao defeated Xuanwu forces at Jin Prefecture. Subsequent battles in spring 902 in which Li Sizhao and Zhou engaged Shi and Zhu's nephew Zhu Youning (朱友寧), however, could not produce conclusive Hedong victories, and Shi was eventually able to defeat Li Sizhao and Zhou at Pu County (蒲縣, in modern Linfen). They tried to withdraw, but the Xuanwu forces chased them. In the subsequent engagement, Li Keyong's son Li Tingluan (李廷鸞) was captured by Xuanwu forces, who then again advanced to Taiyuan and put it under siege. The situation became so dire that Li Keyong, under the advice of his adoptive son Li Cunxin, considered abandoning Taiyuan and fleeing to the north; only at the urging of his wife Lady Liu, as well as Li Sizhao, Li Siyuan, and Zhou, did Li Keyong resolve to defend the city. Li Sizhao and Li Siyuan again led nightly counterattacks against the sieging Xuanwu forces, and eventually, the Xuanwu forces withdrew. Even though Hedong forces were in fact then able to further recapture Ci, Xi, and Fen (汾州, in modern Linfen), it was said that Li Keyong did not dare to again engage Zhu for several years. (Li Maozhen was subsequently forced to sue for peace by surrendering the emperor to Zhu.)

Later in 906, Zhu advanced north and again put Liu Shouwen under siege at Cang Prefecture. Liu Rengong sought aid from Li Keyong to try to save Liu Shouwen. Under Li Keyong's demand, Liu Rengong sent troops to join Hedong forces under Li Sizhao and Zhou in attacking Lu Prefecture (潞州, in modern Changzhi, Shanxi), to try to recapture Zhaoyi Circuit (昭義, headquartered at Lu Prefecture). When the joint Hedong/Lulong forces reached Lu Prefecture, Ding Hui, the military governor commissioned by Zhu, who had been mourning Emperor Zhaozong of Tang (whom Zhu had assassinated in 905 and replaced with his son Emperor Ai), surrendered Lu to them.

In 907, Zhu forced Emperor Ai to yield the throne to him, ending Tang and starting a new Later Liang with him as its Emperor Taizu. Li Keyong, along with Li Maozhen (whose territory became Qi), Yang Wo the military governor of Huainan Circuit (淮南, headquartered in modern Yangzhou, Jiangsu) (whose territory became Wu), and Wang Jian the military governor of Xichuan Circuit (西川, headquartered in modern Chengdu, Sichuan) (whose territory became Former Shu), refused to recognize the Later Liang emperor, and thereafter was effectively the ruler of his own state of Jin (as he had been previously created the Prince of Jin by Emperor Zhaozong). Shortly thereafter, the Later Liang emperor sent the general Kang Huaizhen (康懷貞) to put Lu Prefecture under siege. After a conventional siege failed to capture the city after half a month, Kang built a centipede-like encampment around the city to try to starve it while also using it defensively against any Hedong relief troops. Li Keyong subsequently sent Zhou to command a relief army to try to lift the siege, but while both Li Sizhao and Zhou were able to disrupt the siege operations, Kang's encampment held, and Zhou was unable to lift the siege. By spring 908, with Li Keyong having fallen gravely ill, Zhou withdrew to Luanliu (亂柳, in modern Changzhi). Li Keyong entrusted his oldest biological son, Li Cunxu, whom he designated as his heir, to his brother Li Kening, the eunuch monitor of the army Zhang Chengye, the officers Li Cunzhang and Wu Gong (吳珙), and the secretary Lu Zhi (盧質). Before dying, he stated to Li Cunxu:

Sizhao is stuck in a precarious city, and he is in all kinds of danger. I regret not being able to see him again. After you bury me, you and Dewei need to immediately, with all your strength, try to save him.

Li Keyong, knowing that there was a rivalry between Li Sizhao and Zhou, also told Li Cunxu:

Jintong [(進通, Li Sizhao's original name)] is both faithful and filially pious, and I love him deeply. But the siege against him cannot be lifted. Is it that Dewei cannot forget their old grudges? Tell Dewei this for me: if the siege on Lu cannot be lifted, I would not be able to close my eyes even in death.

Li Keyong then died, and Li Cunxu succeeded him as the Prince of Jin.

== Service under Li Cunxu ==
=== In Li Cunxu's initial campaigns ===
Li Cunxu himself had, immediately after becoming prince, had to deal with a conspiracy by Li Kening and an adoptive son of Li Keyong's, Li Cunhao (李存顥), to overthrow him, but after executing Li Kening and Li Cunhao and Zhou showed submission by returning to Taiyuan to mourn Li Keyong and pay homage to Li Cunxu, Li Cunxu prepared for a campaign to save Li Sizhao. He put Ding Hui in nominal command of the operation, while he himself, Zhou, and Li Siyuan led the main attacks against the Later Liang centipede encampment. They attacked it under the cover of fog, and the Later Liang forces collapsed and fled. When Zhou subsequently arrived at the city walls and announced that the siege had been lifted, Li Sizhao initially did not believe him, but when Li Cunxu subsequently arrived, wearing white armor (thus signifying that Li Keyong had died), Li Sizhao realized what had occurred and fell into deep mourning before opening the gates to let Li Cunxu enter. (Before the battle, Li Cunxu had told Zhou what Li Keyong had said before his death, and Zhou, in response, fought particularly fiercely during the battle. After the battle, he relayed what occurred to Li Sizhao, and the two reformed a friendship.) After the siege was lifted, Zhou put Later Liang's Ze Prefecture (澤州, in modern Jincheng, Shanxi) under siege, but could not quickly capture it against the defense put up by the Later Liang general Niu Cunjie (牛存節); when another Later Liang general, Liu Zhijun, arrived to aid Niu, Zhou lifted the siege and withdrew. For Zhou's contributions in saving Lu Prefecture, Li Cunxu made him the military governor of Zhenwu Circuit (振武, headquartered in modern Shuozhou).

In fall 908, Li Sizhao and Zhou attacked Later Liang's Jin Prefecture and put it under siege. Later Liang's Emperor Taizu personally went to aid Jin Prefecture, and when Li Sizhao and Zhou heard that the Later Liang emperor would be soon arriving, they withdrew.

In 909, after Liu Zhijun had surrendered to Qi, Li Maozhen planned to have Liu command an attack on Later Liang's Shuofang (朔方, headquartered in modern Yinchuan, Ningxia) and Dingnan (定難, headquartered in modern Yulin, Shaanxi) Circuits. He thus requested Li Cunxu to simultaneously attack Jin and Jiang (絳州, in modern Yuncheng) Prefectures. Li Cunxu prepared to attack those prefectures, and he sent Zhou to attack Jin Prefecture first. Zhou put Jin Prefecture under siege, but could not capture it quickly. When the Later Liang general Yang Shihou then arrived, he withdrew.

In 910, in another coordinated attack between Qi and Jin, Li Maozhen personally went to attack Dingnan, then governed by Li Renfu, along with his vassals Li Jihui the military governor of Jingnan and Liu (whom he had commissioned the military governor of Zhangyi Circuit (彰義, headquartered in modern Pingliang, Gansu), while Li Cunxu sent Zhou. The joint Qi and Jin forces put Dingnan's capital Xia Prefecture (夏州) under siege. When the Later Liang generals Li Yu (李遇) and Liu Wan (劉綰) subsequently arrived to aid Li Renfu, however, the Qi and Jin forces withdrew.

In late 910, Later Liang's Emperor Taizu, believing that Wang Rong, who at that point was a Later Liang vassal carrying the title of Prince of Zhao, would turn against him eventually, decided to take Chengde (which he had renamed Wushun (武順)) by force. He sent his attendants Du Tingyin (杜廷隱) and Ding Yanhui (丁延徽) to Wushun's Shen (深州) and Ji (冀州, both in modern Hengshui, Hebei) Prefectures with troops, claiming to be helping Wushun defend against a possible attack by Liu Shouguang. Despite advice by his officer Shi Gongli (石公立) against doing so, Wang Rong received Du and Ding. However, once they settled into the cities, they slaughtered the remaining Wushun garrisons at the two prefectures and prepared for defense, waiting for the main Later Liang forces under the general Wang Jingren to arrive to try to conquer the rest of Wushun. Wang Rong ordered Shi to try to recapture the two prefectures, but Shi was unable to, so Wang sought emergency aid from both Li Cunxu and Liu Shouguang. Liu refused to act, but Li Cunxu immediately sent Zhou to reinforce the defenses of Wushun's Zhao Prefecture (趙州, in modern Shijiazuang) and then prepared to personally aid Wang Rong. Hearing of what Later Liang forces did to Wushun, Wang Chuzhi the military governor of nearby Yiwu Circuit (義武, headquartered in modern Baoding, Hebei) also turned against Later Liang. (Yiwu and Wushun thus became effectively independent states in alliance with Jin, and they, as Jin had been, returned to the use of the Tang era name of Tianyou; Wushun also changed its name back to Chengde.)

Soon thereafter, the main Later Liang army under Wang Jingren arrived, and the allied Jin/Zhao/Yiwu forces prepared to engage them. However, Zhou, while dealing the forward Later Liang forces minor defeats, urged caution—pointing out that the area of engagement was not an open field and therefore the Jin cavalry advantage would turn into a disadvantage. Li Cunxu initially refused to listen, but Zhou persuaded Zhang Chengye to also urge against immediate engagement. Li Cunxu listened to Zhang and followed Zhou's advice. He thus withdrew to a more open area and did not engage Wang Jingren until spring 911, at Boxiang (柏鄉, in modern Xingtai). By that point, the Later Liang army was low on food supplies due to Zhou's raids against their food supply route, and after a full day of battle, they were worn out and eventually collapsed when Wang Jingren's immediate forces moved, causing the rest of the army to believe that he had fled. In the aftermaths, Du and Ding abandoned Shen and Ji, allowing Zhao to retake those prefectures. The Jin/Zhao combined army further attacked south, preparing to attack Later Liang's Tianxiong (i.e., Weibo) and Baoyi (保義, headquartered at Xing Prefecture) Circuits; during this advancement, Zhou attacked Bei (貝州, in modern Xingtai) and Chan (澶州, in modern Anyang, Henan), advancing as far as the Yellow River. When Liu Shouguang subsequently postured to get involved, however, Li Cunxu, fearing an attack by Liu from the back, withdrew the Jin army from the front and himself returned to Taiyuan, but left Zhou with 3,000 men to help defend Zhao Prefecture.

=== Destruction of Yan ===
In late 911, Liu Shouguang, who earlier had claimed the title of Emperor of Yan, attacked Yiwu. Wang Chuzhi sought aid from Li Cunxu, who sent Zhou to aid him. In spring 912, Zhou joined forces with Wang Rong's adoptive son Wang Deming and the Yiwu officer Cheng Yan (程巖) to start an attack on Yan. With Liu Rengong's son Liu Shouqi (劉守奇), who had fled to Hedong when Liu Shouguang overthrew Liu Rengong, in his army, Liu Zhiwen (劉知溫) the prefect of Zhuo Prefecture (涿州, in modern Baoding) quickly surrendered to Liu Shouqi. Zhou, however, was jealous that Liu Shouqi quickly won this victory and made false accusations to Li Cunxu against Liu Shouqi. Liu Shouqi, realizing this, fled to Later Liang. Meanwhile, Zhou quickly advanced to Yan's capital You Prefecture (幽州), but did not immediately put it under siege. Rather, he attacked Yan's other cities, capturing them one by one until You Prefecture was isolated. He also sought additional troops from Li Cunxu, stating his belief that his army was not large enough for a siege, so Li Cunxu sent his adoptive brothers Li Cunshen and Li Siyuan to aid Zhou. Soon thereafter, Zhou captured the Yan general Dan Tinggui (單廷珪) in a one-on-one combat, greatly cutting into the Yan morale.

With his city-to-city campaign successful, by summer 912, Zhou was putting You Prefecture under siege. When Liu Shouguang sent a humbly-worded letter begging for peace, Zhou mocked him, stating:

The Emperor of the Great Yan has not yet offered sacrifices to heaven and earth. Why is he sounding like a woman? I received my orders to attack the guilty one. It is not my responsibility to talk about alliances and peace.

Zhou thus turned down Liu Shouguang's overture, but after Liu again begged, he relayed Liu's offer of peace to Li Cunxu. Meanwhile, Liu Shouqi and Yan Shihou entered Zhao territory to try to force Zhou to give up his campaign to save Zhao. Zhou sent Wang Deming back to Zhao to aid the Jin generals Li Cunshen and Shi Jiantang (史建瑭) in defending Zhao, but did not relent on his siege. When Li Cunxu subsequently sent Zhang Chengye to You Prefecture to discuss the status of the siege with Zhou, Liu Shouguang offered to surrender to Zhang, but Zhang refused, citing Liu Shouguang's past history of not following his own words. Zhou subsequently repelled a counterattack by Liu Shouguang.

By winter 913, You Prefecture was in desperate straits. Liu Shouguang offered to surrender if Li Cunxu personally came to accept his surrender. Zhou thus relayed this offer to Li Cunxu. When Li Cunxu arrived and promised Liu Shouguang that his life would be spared if he did surrender, Liu Shouguang hesitated and did not do so. When Liu Shouguang's trusted officer Li Xiaoxi (李小喜) then surrendered and revealed to the Jin army the desperate situation the city was in, the Jin army launched its fiercest attack yet, and the city fell. Liu Shouguang fled, but soon was captured. Li Cunxu made Zhou the military governor of Lulong, and took Liu Shouguang and Liu Rengong as captives. (He executed them in 914.)

=== Governance of Lulong ===
While Zhou Dewei was a renowned general, governing Lulong posed a challenge that he had not faced before—dealing with the growing threat of the Khitan to the north. The Khitan tribes had been unified into a state under Yelü Abaoji, who claimed the title of emperor (as Emperor Taizu, of the state that would eventually be known as Liao dynasty). It was said that during the rule of prior military governors of Lulong, they would put up strong defenses at Yu Pass, with the garrisons at and around the pass forming a self-sustaining unit with the local farmers and the local government. During fall and winter, the harvest would be gathered early so that nothing would remain on the field for the Khitan to use on their incursions. Therefore, the Khitan did not dare to venture deep into Lulong territory. However, after Zhou became military governor, he, overly confident of his own fighting abilities, neglected to maintain the defenses at Yu Pass. The Khitan were therefore able to slip past it and make the area between Ying (營州, in modern Chaoyang, Liaoning) and Ping (平州, in modern Qinhuangdao, Hebei) a grazing field, so the defense was lost. Further, Zhou was suspicious of the loyalty of the Lulong army, so he found excuses to execute many of its senior officers, causing the army morale to drop.

Meanwhile, after Yan's destruction, Li Cunxu prepared to begin campaigns against Later Liang in earnest. In fall 914, he met with Zhou and Wang Rong at Zhao Prefecture, and subsequently advanced south to attack Xing Prefecture. Li Sizhao also arrived to join them with Zhaoyi troops. However, they withdrew after Yang Shihou arrived and the Jin officer Cao Jinjin (曹進金) defected to Later Liang.

In 915, the Later Liang emperor Zhu Zhen (Emperor Taizu's son and successor), after the recent death of Yang (who was military governor of Tianxiong at that time), decided to reduce Tianxiong's strength, which had caused it to be a difficult-to-tame circuit in the past. He decided to divide Tianxiong into two circuits. The Tianxiong army, however, did not wish to be divided, and they mutinied, putting the Later Liang-commissioned military governor He Delun (賀德倫) under arrest and forcing him to write to Li Cunxu to submit to Jin. Li Cunxu subsequently arrived and accepted Tianxiong's submission. Zhu Zhen sent the general Liu Xun to try to recapture Tianxiong, but believing that, given the Jin strength was at Tianxiong at that time, Taiyuan could be captured, Liu Xun decided to put up a facade that he was going to engage Li Cunxu and instead headed directly for Taiyuan. When Zhou realized this, he chased after Liu Xun and, bypassing him, blocked his path to Taiyuan and trapping him in the Taihang Mountains briefly, although Liu was eventually able to fight past Zhou and escape, albeit with losses.

In spring 917, Li Cunxu's younger brother Li Cunju (李存矩), who was then serving as the defender of Weisai Base (威塞軍) at Xin Prefecture (新洲, in modern Zhangjiakou, Hebei), was ordered by Li Cunxu to conscript troops and collect horses in order to send reinforcements for Li Cunxu's campaign efforts. Li Cunju's urgency in collecting soldiers and horses drew resentment and fear from the people, and as he subsequently advanced south to join Li Cunxu, the soldiers mutinied and killed him, supporting his deputy Lu Wenjin to return to Xin Prefecture, but the defending officer of Xin, Yang Quanzhang (楊全章) refused to receive him. He then attacked Wu Prefecture (武州, in modern Zhangjiakou), but was defeated by Li Sigong (李嗣肱). Zhou also sent forces to attack Lu, who then fled to Khitan.

Energized by Lu's arrival, as Lu was able to serve as a guide for attacks on Jin territory, Khitan's Emperor Taizu decided to launch a major attack on Lulong. Later in the spring, the Khitan army, with Lu serving as its guide, attacked and quickly captured Xin Prefecture. When Li Cunxu ordered Zhou to counterattack with Lulong troops, joined by Zhao and Yiwu troops, they were defeated by Khitan troops, and Zhou was forced to flee back to You Prefecture. The Khitan forces subsequently put You Prefecture under siege, and Zhou requested emergency aid from Li Cunxu. Li Cunxu, who was then stalemated with Later Liang forces on the Yellow River, was fearful of diverting forces to save Zhou, but under the urging of Li Siyuan, Li Cunshen, and Yan Bao (閻寶), decided to do so. He ordered Li Siyuan and Yan to advance first toward You, and then sent Li Cunshen to reinforce them. Together, they defeated Khitan forces and lifted the siege on You. However, it was said that after this battle, You Prefecture became constantly under the threat of Khitan, which would send raiders to cut off food supply routes to You. Further, the Khitan emperor commissioned Lu as the military governor of his own Lulong Circuit (headquartered at Ping Prefecture), and Lu and his Han troops would serve as guides in every Khitan incursion into Jin territory. It was said that Lulong's prefectures became gravely stricken by the constant Khitan raids.

=== Death at Huliu Slope ===
In fall 918, Li Cunxu prepared for a major attack on Later Liang. He had Zhou (with Lulong troops), Li Cunshen (with Henghai (i.e., Yichang) troops), and Li Siyuan (with Anguo (i.e., Baoyi)) troops rendezvous at Tianxiong's capital Wei Prefecture (魏州) with him and the Hedong and Tianxiong troops directly under his command, as well as Yiwu troops that Wang Chuzhi sent and tribal troops from Xi, Khitan, Shiwei, and Tuyuhun tribes under him. When he heard that Zhu Zhen had recently executed the general Xie Yanzhang (謝彥章) under false accusations by another general, He Gui, he was glad and prepared to immediately attack Later Liang. Zhou pointed out that despite Xie's death, the Later Liang army remained strong and that an engagement should be well-thought out before engaged. Li Cunxu did not listen to him and initiated the campaign.

The Jin troops and the Later Liang troops, commanded by He Gui, met at Huliu Slope (胡柳陂, in modern Heze, Shandong), not far from the Later Liang capital Daliang. Zhou pointed out that the Later Liang army outnumbered Jin troops and was highly motivated due to the closeness to their capital. He advocated similar tactics that resulted in the Boxiang victory—refusing to engage Later Liang troops quickly, using cavalry raiders to wear them out and cut off their food supplies, and then engage them once they were tired. Li Cunxu refused, believing that this was the time to finally destroy the main Later Liang army once and for all, and he took his own troops and proceeded without agreement from either Zhou or Li Cunshen. Zhou was forced to follow Li Cunxu, but commented to his son, "I will not have a good place to die." Subsequently, in the initial engagement, Jin forces prevailed over that of He's subordinate Wang Yanzhang, but as Wang Yanzhang was withdrawing toward the west, Jin's support troops, which was to the west as well, thought that Wang was winning the battle and heading toward them to attack them, panicked and fled, colliding with Li Cunxu's and Zhou's troops. Zhou died in the ensuing confusion, along with his son, as did Li Cunxu's secretary, Wang Jian (王緘) the deputy military governor of Tianxiong. Jin forces later counterattacked and fought the battle to a draw, with both armies said to have casualties of two thirds of their troops.

Li Cunxu, regretting that his refusal to listen to Zhou had caused Zhou's death, mourned him bitterly. He made Zhou's son Zhou Guangfu (周光輔) the prefect of Lan Prefecture (嵐州, in modern Lüliang, Shanxi). After Li Cunxu later established Later Tang as its Emperor Zhuangzong, he gave Zhou posthumous honors. Later, after Li Siyuan succeeded as Emperor Mingzong, he had Zhou, as well as Li Sizhao and Li Cunshen, worshipped at Emperor Zhuangzong's temple. Later, after Emperor Mingzong's son-in-law Shi Jingtang established Later Jin as its Emperor Gaozu, he further posthumously created Zhou the Prince of Yan.

== Notes and references ==
- History of the Five Dynasties, vol. 56.
- New History of the Five Dynasties, vol. 25.
- Zizhi Tongjian, vols. 261, 262, 263, 265, 266, 267, 268, 269, 270.
