= Battle of Jisu =

10th-century battle in Imperial China

- Part of Five Dynasties and Ten Kingdoms Period
Date	909
Location	Jisu (in modern Tianjin)
Result	Liu Shouguang victory

Belligerents
Liu Shouguang	Liu Shouwen Khitans Tuyuhun

Commanders and leaders
Liu Shouguang Yuan Xingqin	Liu Shouwen

Strength
Unknown	40,000

Casualties and losses
Unknown	Unknown, most likely heavier

The Battle of Jisu was fought in 909 between the brothers Liu Shouguang and Liu Shouwen following Liu Shouguang's overthrow of their father Liu Rengong. Liu Shouguang won the battle and subsequently killed Liu Shouwen

== Background ==
During the Five Dynasties and Ten Kingdoms Period, China was in chaos and was a battleground for various warlords. Liu Rengong was one of the more successful of these. Gaining independence from Li Keyong in 897, Liu Rengong built a powerful state in the northeast of China that was capable of fighting some of the most important warlords of the period, such as Li Keyong and Zhu Quanzhong. However, as he got older Liu Rengong grew into a more cruel, hedonistic and ineffective ruler and began spending more and more time with his concubines in his palace at Mount Da’an (in modern Beijing). His state also began losing much territory to Zhu Quanzhong. This increasing ineptness would eventually lead to his downfall. The catalyst for his overthrow was when he discovered that one of his sons, the successful general Liu Shouguang, was having an affair with his favourite concubine Lady Luo. He subsequently threw Liu Shouguang out of the household and disowned him. Then in 907 an army loyal to Zhu Quanzhong launched a surprise attack on Liu Rengong's capital You Prefecture. Liu Rengong was at Mount Da’an and the city was practically defenceless, however the disowned Liu Shouguang took troops and successfully defended the capital and forced back the invading army. Liu Shouguang then attacked Mount Da’an and captured Liu Rengong, who he put under house arrest. However another son of Liu Rengong called Liu Shouwen was unhappy with this as he was older and had more of claim over his father's territory. He raised his own forces and a civil war broke out between the brothers.

== Battle ==
In 908 Liu Shouwen launched multiple attacks against Liu Shouguang but was repelled. However, in 909 Liu Shouwen agreed an alliance with the Khitans and some Tuyuhun tribes in exchange for money, which bolstered his total forces to 40,000. With this army he engaged Liu Shouguang at Jisu (possibly the modern city of Tianjin or another town in the vicinity). Details of the fighting are not known but Liu Shouwen's troops initially prevailed over those of Liu Shouguang and it seemed that he would win. However, for any multitude of reasons, Liu Shouwen then rushed onto the battlefield proclaiming “Do not kill my brother”. This action had left him isolated from his guards however, and a loyal general of Liu Shouguang called Yuan Xingqin attacked and captured Liu Shouwen. With their general captured the troops of Liu Shouwen began to run away, especially the Khitan and Tuyuhun troops who realised they now had no one to pay them. The battle ended in a complete victory for Liu Shouguang.

== Aftermath ==
Some forces loyal to Liu Shouwen would hold out in his capital Cang Prefecture until spring 910. Liu Shouwen was initially put under house arrest but then assassinated under the orders of Liu Shouguang, who then blamed the killer and executed him. Liu Shouguang would later claim the title Emperor of Yan but would only rule till 913 when he was defeated by the son of Li Keyong, Li Cunxu, who took over his territory. Both him and Liu Rengong were executed by Li Cunxu in 914.
