= Liu Rengong =

Chinese warlord during the Tang dynasty

Liu Rengong (Chinese: 劉仁恭) (died 914) was a warlord late in the Chinese Tang dynasty who controlled Lulong Circuit (盧龍, headquartered in modern Beijing) from 895 (when his one-time lord Li Keyong conquered Lulong and left him in charge of it) to 907 (when he was overthrown by his son Liu Shouguang and put under house arrest). He was initially a Lulong officer, but later fled to Li Keyong's Hedong Circuit (河東, headquartered in modern Taiyuan, Shanxi). After Li conquered Lulong and left him in charge, he turned against Li and became an independent warlord, although at times he and Li would still act in concert. His domain later became the basis of the Five Dynasties and Ten Kingdoms period state Yan that Liu Shouguang established. In 913, however, Li Keyong's son and successor Li Cunxu the Prince of Jin conquered Yan and captured both Liu Shouguang and Liu Rengong; he put them to death the next year.

== Background ==
It is not known when Liu Rengong was born—although he was said to be spreading the rumor that he would become a military governor (jiedushi) at age 48 when he later served Li Kuangwei, indicating that he was not yet 48 by that point. His family was originally from Leshou (樂壽, in modern Cangzhou, Hebei), which was not a part of Lulong Circuit, although he would follow his father Liu Sheng (劉晟) to Lulong Circuit, as Liu Sheng served under the military governor Li Keju. It was said that Liu Rengong was already shown to be full of tactics in his youth, and often made military suggestions. When Li Keju sent the officer Li Quanzhong to attack Yi Prefecture (易州, in modern Baoding, Hebei), which belonged to neighboring Yiwu Circuit (義武, headquartered in modern Baoding) in 885, Liu Rengong served under Li Quanzhong. When Li Quanzhong's subordinate Yu Yan (于晏) put Yi under siege but could not capture it for months, it was Liu who came up with the idea of digging a tunnel into the city to capture it. For this act, he became known under the nickname of Liu Kutou (劉窟頭, i.e., "Liu who headed into the tunnel"). Later that year, when Yiwu forces recaptured Yi, Li Quanzhong, in fear of punishment by Li Keju, overthrew Li Keju and took over the circuit; Li Quanzhong then died in 886 and passed the circuit to his son Li Kuangwei.

It was said that Liu was ambitious, and he spread rumors that he dreamed of a giant Buddha banner coming out of his fingers, and that he was told in the dreams that he would be a military governor at age 48. When Li Kuangwei heard this, he disliked Liu; he stripped Liu of his military position and made him the magistrate of Jingcheng County (景城, in modern Cangzhou). At one point, when a mutiny at the prefectural capital of Ying Prefecture (瀛州, in modern Cangzhou) resulted in the prefect's death, Liu conscripted a thousand inexperienced soldiers and put down the mutiny. Li Kuangwei was very pleased, made him an army officer again, and gave him command of a garrison at Wei Prefecture (蔚州, in modern Zhangjiakou, Hebei).

It was said that, as the soldiers at Wei were not promptly rotated back to Lulong's capital You Prefecture (幽州) after a number of years, they became resentful, as they missed their families. In 893, when Li Kuangwei was himself overthrown in a coup by his brother Li Kuangchou, Liu decided to take advantage of the confusion by leading his army to attack You Prefecture. However, when he reached Juyong Pass, the headquarter's army defeated his. He thereafter fled to Hedong Circuit, where he was treated well by Hedong's military governor Li Keyong.

== Service under Li Keyong ==
Liu Rengong was said to carefully serve both Li Keyong and Li Keyong's chief strategist Gai Yu, and through Gai, he made repeated suggestions to Li Keyong that Lulong could be conquered, and he asked for 10,000 men for the campaign. However, as during this time Li Keyong was dealing with the rebellion of his adoptive son Li Cunxiao at Xingming Circuit (邢洺, headquartered in modern Xingtai, Hebei), he was only able to give Liu several thousand men, and the campaign failed. This caused Li Kuangchou to become arrogant and feel free to harass Hedong's borders. In anger, in winter 894 (after he had defeated and executed Li Cunxiao and reabsorbed Li Cunxiao's territory), Li Keyong personally launched a major attack on Lulong. You Prefecture fell quickly to him; Li Kuangchou fled to neighboring Yichang Circuit (義昌, headquartered in modern Cangzhou) and was killed by Yichang's military governor Lu Yanwei.

In spring 895, Li Keyong formally entered You Prefecture, and he had Liu and an adoptive son, Li Cunshen, surveil and pacify the region. He left Liu in charge of Lulong as acting military governor, and then returned to Hedong. He left an army detachment and a group of associates, headed by Yan Liude (燕留德), at Lulong, to accompany Liu. However, the Hedong soldiers soon ran into conflicts with the Lulong officer Gao Siji (高思繼) and Gao Siji's brothers, as they bullied the Lulong people. The Gao brothers executed a number of them, drawing Li Keyong's displeasure, and Li Keyong rebuked Liu. Liu, blaming all of the executions on the Gao brothers, delivered them to Hedong, where Li Keyong executed them. Liu, however, in order to pacify the Lulong people, took in the Gao brothers' sons as officers in the Lulong army. In summer 895, then-reigning Emperor Zhaozong formally made Liu the military governor of Lulong.

Through the years that Liu served as Li Keyong's vassal, the officers that Li Keyong left at Lulong managed much of the affairs of the circuit. They collected taxes from the circuit, and, except for what was needed for the Lulong army's supplies, they delivered the rest to Hedong, contrary to the prior customs during Lulong's independence periods where Lulong kept its own revenues. In 897, by which time Emperor Zhaozong had fled from the imperial capital Chang'an to Zhenguo Circuit (鎮國, headquartered in modern Weinan, Shaanxi) due to attacks by the warlord Li Maozhen the military governor of Fengxiang Circuit (鳳翔, headquartered in modern Baoji, Shaanxi), Li Keyong planned a campaign to assist the emperor. He thus requisitioned troops from Lulong, but Liu declined his requisition request, claiming that the soldiers were needed to defend against Khitan incursions. For several months, Li Keyong sent repeated letters, and Liu continued to decline. When Li Keyong sent a harshly worded rebuke, Liu threw the letter onto the ground, put the Hedong emissary under arrest, and tried to kill the Hedong officers stationed at Lulong, who fled and escaped death, according to the Zizhi Tongjian. (The History of the Five Dynasties and the New History of the Five Dynasties indicated that Liu did in fact kill a number of them, including Yan.)

== As independent warlord ==
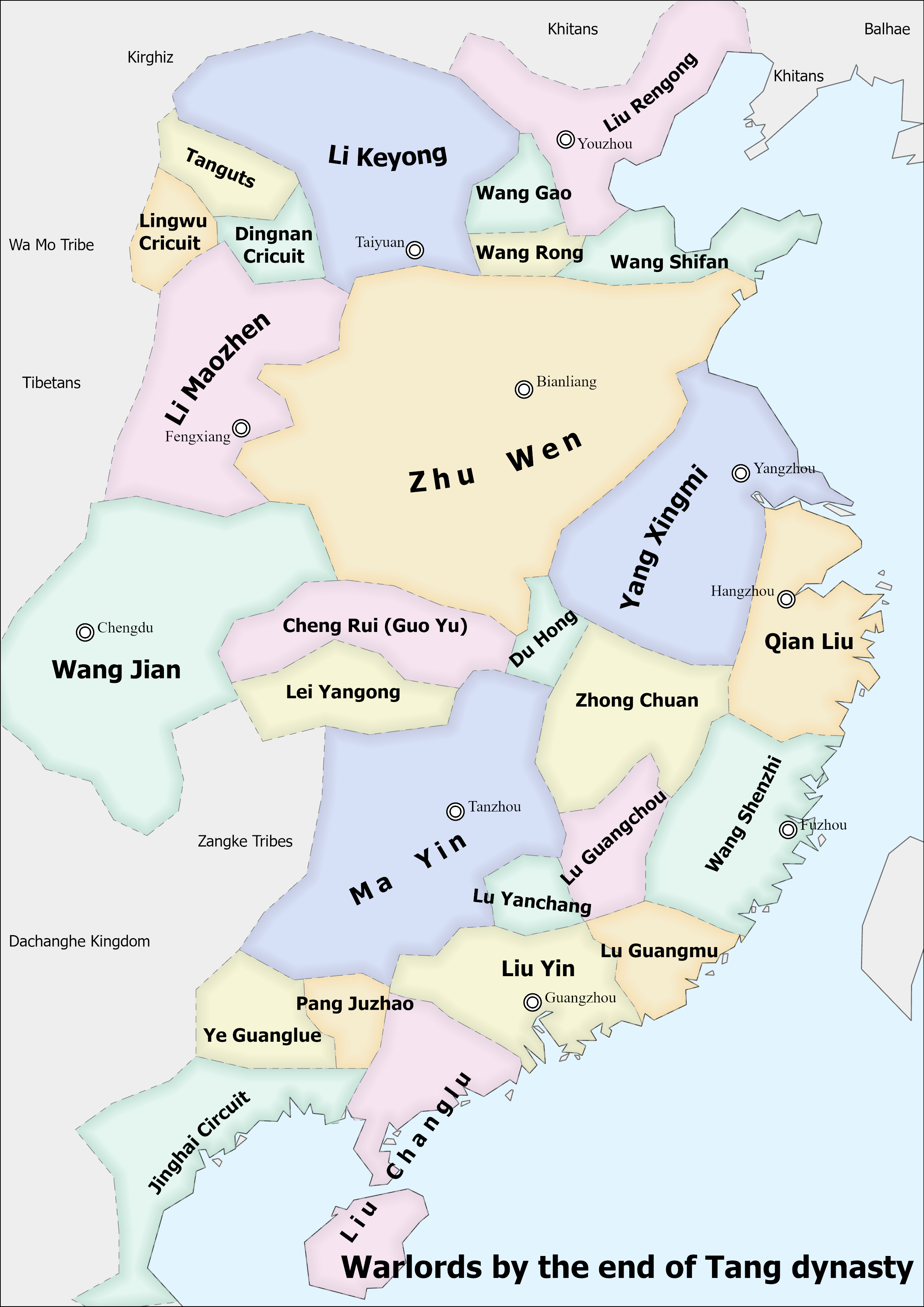
Map of warlords before the end of the Tang dynasty including Liu Rengong

In fall 897, angry at Liu Rengong's betrayal, Li Keyong commanded the army himself and attacked Lulong. He engaged the Lulong forces commanded by Liu's son-in-law Dan Keji (單可及), but was defeated when his army was ambushed by the Lulong officer Yang Shikan (楊師侃) at Mugua Creek (木瓜澗, in modern Baoding), at great losses; it was only the inclement weather at the time that prevented the Lulong forces from inflicting greater damage. Li Keyong was forced to abandon this attempt to retake Lulong. Thereafter, Liu formed a relationship with Li Keyong's archrival Zhu Quanzhong the military governor of Xuanwu Circuit (宣武, headquartered in modern Kaifeng, Henan), and under Zhu's recommendation, Emperor Zhaozong bestowed the honorary chancellor designation of Tong Zhongshu Menxia Pingzhangshi (同中書門下平章事) on Liu. However, Liu also wrote a letter to Li Keyong apologizing for what happened.

Meanwhile, Liu had a running dispute with Lu Yanwei over the two circuits' control of the salt trade. In 898, Liu sent his son Liu Shouwen to attack Yichang's capital Cang Prefecture (滄州). Lu, unable to resist, abandoned it and fled to Weibo Circuit (魏博, headquartered in modern Handan, Hebei), allowing Liu Shouwen to take the circuit. Liu Rengong commissioned Liu Shouwen as acting military governor, and then made a request to Emperor Zhaozong that Liu Shouwen be given a formal commission as military governor, the imperial government initially refused. In response, Liu Rengong made an irreverent statement to the imperial emissary:

I have my own banners and staffs, too. All I want are the authentically-colored ones from Chang'an. Why is it that I have had to make repeated requests and that we still have not received them? Tell them [(i.e., the emperor and the chancellors)] what I said!

In any case, it was said that after the victory over Yichang, Liu Rengong, believing in his military strength, began to have ambitions of controlling the entire region north of the Yellow River. In spring 899, he launched a major attack on Weibo. When he captured Weibo's Bei Prefecture (貝州, in modern Xingtai), he slaughtered the population of the entire city and threw the bodies into the river. In response, all of the subsequent Weibo cities he attacked defended themselves to the death. He decided to, instead, directly attack Weibo's capital Wei Prefecture. Weibo's military governor Luo Shaowei sought aid from both Zhu and Li Keyong. When Zhu's generals Li Si'an (李思安) and Zhang Cunjing (張存敬) arrived first, Liu had Liu Shouwen and Dan engage them, but the Xuanwu forces defeated them, killing Dan and nearly killing Liu Shouwen as well. When Xuanwu generals Ge Congzhou and He Delun (賀德倫) subsequently arrived as well and again engaged Lulong forces along with Weibo forces, the Lulong forces were again defeated, and the Lulong officers Xue Tujue (薛突厥) and Wang Guilang (王鄶郎) were captured. Liu Rengong and Liu Shouwen were forced to flee back to their territory.

In 900, Zhu further had Ge command armies of four circuits (Xuanwu, Weibo, and two other circuits under Zhu's control—Taining (泰寧, headquartered in modern Jining, Shandong) and Tianping (天平, headquartered in modern Tai'an, Shandong)) to attack Liu Rengong's territory. Ge quickly captured Yichang's De Prefecture (德州, in modern Dezhou, Shandong) and put Liu Shouwen under siege at Cang Prefecture. When Liu Rengong sought aid from Li Keyong, Li Keyong responded by sending his officer Zhou Dewei and his nephew Li Sizhao to attack the Xingming region (which had fallen to Zhu earlier) to try to divert Zhu's forces. When Liu Rengong himself tried to lift the siege by engaging Ge, Ge defeated him. However, when weather turned against the siege army, and mediators were sent by Wang Rong the military governor of Chengde Circuit (成德, headquartered in modern Shijiazhuang, Hebei), Ge withdrew.

In winter 900, after forcing Wang to become a vassal, Zhu again had Zhang lead an army, with supplements from Weibo, to attack Liu. Zhang quickly captured Lulong's Ying and Mo (莫州, in modern Cangzhou) Prefectures and Yichang's Jing Prefecture (景州, in modern Cangzhou). (In the latter battle, the prefect Liu Renba (劉仁霸), who might have been a brother to Liu Rengong, was captured.) Zhang prepared to next attack You Prefecture, but subsequent weather conditions stopped him, and he instead attacked Yiwu and forced that circuit into submission (despite Liu Shouwen's attempts to assist Yiwu).

In 901, Emperor Zhaozong bestowed the greater honorary chancellor title of Shizhong (侍中) on Liu Rengong.

In 903, after Emperor Zhaozong (who had fallen effectively to Zhu's control by that point) ordered a general massacre of eunuchs, Liu did not execute Zhang Juhan the eunuch monitor of the Lulong army; rather, he hid Zhang, and executed a prisoner in Zhang's stead.

Also in 903, Wang Jinghui (王敬暉), an officer at Li Keyong's Yun Prefecture (雲州, in modern Datong, Shanxi), assassinated the prefect Liu Zaili (劉再立) and submitted to Liu Rengong. Li Keyong sent Li Sizhao and Li Cunshen to attack Wang. Liu sent forces to aid Wang, forcing Li Sizhao and Li Cunshen to retreat some distance, allowing Wang to abandon Yun and flee to Liu Rengong's territory.

Over the years, it was said that Liu Rengong gained great understanding on Khitan's military operations, and he often sent armies to pillage the Khitan lands, as well as to burn the grazing fields to prevent the Khitan horses from grazing properly. In winter 903, when the Khitan leader Yelü Abaoji sent his brother-in-law Shulü Abo (述律阿缽) to attack Shanhai Pass, Liu Rengong's son Liu Shouguang, who was then defending Ping Prefecture (平州, in modern Qinhuangdao, Hebei), pretended to be parlaying with the Khitan officers and invited them to a feast, but ambushed them there once they became drunk and captured them. The Khitan were forced to pay Liu Rengong a large ransom to get them released.

In 906, when Zhu again put Cang Prefecture under siege, Liu Rengong, after repeated losses against Zhu's army, felt that he needed even more soldiers, so he ordered all men from age 15 to 70 to serve, tattooing their faces. He also sought aid from Hedong. Li Keyong initially refused to help him, but later, under the advice of his son Li Cunxu, relented; as per Li Cunxu's advice, he requested Liu to send an army to attack Zhaoyi Circuit (昭義, headquartered in modern Changzhi, Shanxi) – which had previously been Li Keyong's territory but had fallen to Zhu earlier – with him, to divert Zhu's army. Liu agreed, and the Hedong and Lulong forces attacked Zhaoyi. Ding Hui, the Zhaoyi military governor that Zhu commissioned, surrendered, forcing Zhu to lift the siege on Cang Prefecture and withdraw.

it was said that over the years, as Liu Rengong became more entrenched in his rule of Lulong, he became even more arrogant, wasteful, and violent. Believing the headquarters in You Prefecture to be insecure, he built a grand mansion at Mount Da'an (大安山, in modern Beijing), which was built like an imperial palace. He selected many beautiful women and put them in the Da'an mansion. He also retained alchemists to try to achieve immortality. He hoarded the money from the people of the circuit, instead making coins out of clay, and he prohibited purchasing tea leaves from south of the Yangtze River, instead using the leaves of the circuit's trees as tea substitutes.

== Overthrow by Liu Shouguang and subsequent house arrest ==
In or sometime before 907, Liu Rengong discovered that Liu Shouguang had been having an affair with Liu Rengong's favorite concubine Lady Luo. He caned Liu Shouguang, threw him out of the household, and disowned him.

In spring 907, Zhu Quanzhong sent Li Si'an to make a surprise attack on You Prefecture. As Li Si'an approached, Liu Rengong was still at the Mount Da'an mansion, and the city was left nearly defenseless. It nearly fell, but Liu Shouguang took troops and entered the city to defend it; he then engaged Li Si'an in battle, forcing Li Si'an to withdraw. He then claimed the title of military governor and had his generals Li Xiaoxi (李小喜) and Yuan Xingqin attack Liu Rengong's mansion at Mount Da'an. Li Xiaoxi defeated the troops that Liu Rengong sent to defend against the attack, and then captured Liu Rengong and returned with him to You Prefecture, where Liu Shouguang put him under arrest. Liu Shouguang killed many of Liu Rengong's close associates whom he did not like. Therefore, a number of officers, including Liu Shouguang's younger brother Liu Shouqi (劉守奇), nephew Wang Sitong, and the officer Li Chengyue (李承約), fled to Hedong Circuit.

Hearing of what Liu Shougguang did, Liu Shouwen launched his troops to attack Liu Shouguang, with initially inconclusive results. (In this fraternal war, Liu Shouguang received aid from Li Cunxu, who had succeeded Li Keyong as the military governor of Hedong and the Prince of Jin after Li Keyong's death in 908, while Liu Shouwen was assisted by the Khitan and the Tuyuhun tribal armies.) In 909, they fought each other at the Battle of Jisu (雞蘇, in modern Tianjin), where Liu Shouwen initially prevailed. However, Liu Shouwen then stepped out onto the battlefield and stated, "Do not kill my brother!" As he did, Yuan, who knew that it was Liu Shouwen, made a surprise attack and captured him. Liu Shouguang put Liu Shouwen under house arrest as well, and then put Cang Prefecture, which was defended by Liu Shouwen's son Liu Yanzuo, under siege. The city fell in 910, so Liu Shouguang took Yichang under his control as well. He then had Liu Shouwen killed, while submitting a petition to Zhu Quanzhong (who had seized the Tang throne by this point and established a new Later Liang as its Emperor Taizu) in Liu Rengong's name, seeking retirement. The Later Liang emperor approved of Liu Rengong's retirement, bestowed the title of Taishi (太師) on Liu Rengong, and subsequently created Liu Shouguang the Prince of Yan.

== Death ==
Liu Shouguang, however, was not satisfied with the princely title under Later Liang suzerainty. In 911, he claimed the title of Emperor of Yan. Subsequently, Li Cunxu, who was by that time allied with Wang Rong and Wang Chuzhi the military governor of Yiwu, had Zhou Dewei command a major operation against the new Yan state. By late 913, nearly all Yan cities had fallen to the Jin army, except for You Prefecture. Liu Shouguang claimed that he would surrender to Li Cunxu if Li Cunxu personally arrived to accept his surrender, but when Li Cunxu arrived, Liu Shouguang again refused to surrender, under Li Xiaoxi's advice. However, Li Xiaoxi then himself surrendered to the Jin army and revealed the desperate state the Yan army was in. Li Cunxu then ordered a final attack, and the city fell. Liu Rengong, his wife, and his concubines were taken captive. Liu Shouguang tried to flee to Cang Prefecture (which was then defended by Liu Shouqi, who had become a Later Liang general), but was captured on the way there. (When he was brought back to You Prefecture, Liu Rengong and his wife both spat on him and stated, "Rebellious bandit! Look at what you did to our household!")

In spring 914, Li Cunxu took the Liu household, including Liu Rengong and Liu Shouguang, on a victory tour through Yiwu and Chengde Circuits, at Wang Chuzhi's and Wang Rong's invitation. When they arrived at Chengde Circuit, at Wang Rong's request (as Wang Rong wanted to finally meet Liu Rengong in person), Li Cunxu temporarily removed the shackles from Liu Rengong and Liu Shouguang, and had them attend a feast that Wang Rong held for him. After they arrived back at Hedong's capital Taiyuan, Li Cunxu first executed Liu Shouguang in the capital, along with his wives, and then had his deputy military governor Lu Rubi (盧汝弼) transport Liu Rengong to Li Keyong's tomb at Dai Prefecture (代州, in modern Xinzhou, Shanxi). There, his chest was first pierced, with the blood sacrificed to Li Keyong, and then he was decapitated.

== Notes and references ==
- New Book of Tang, vol. 212.
- History of the Five Dynasties, vol. 135.
- New History of the Five Dynasties, vol. 39.
- Zizhi Tongjian, vols. 256, 259, 260, 261, 262, 264, 265, 266, 267, 268, 269.
