= Yuan Xingqin =

10th-century Chinese politician

Yuan Xingqin (元行欽) (died 26 May 926), known as Li Shaorong (李紹榮) c. 915–926, was a Chinese military general and politician of the Five Dynasties and Ten Kingdoms period Yan and Jin/Later Tang states. He was initially a trusted general under Yan's only emperor Liu Shouguang, but after his capture in battle by Jin forces, became a close associate of Jin's prince Li Cunxu (the later Emperor Zhuangzong of Later Tang).

After Emperor Zhuangzong was killed in a mutiny in 926, Xingqin was captured by and executed by Emperor Zhuangzong's adoptive brother Li Siyuan (the later Emperor Mingzong) for having killed Li Siyuan's son Li Congshen (李從審, also known as Li Jijing (李繼璟)).

== Background and service during Yan ==
It is not known when Yuan Xingqin was born, but it is known that he was from You Prefecture (幽州, in modern Beijing). He was initially an officer under Liu Shouguang, one of the sons of Liu Rengong, a late Tang dynasty warlord who ruled Lulong Circuit (盧龍, headquartered at You Prefecture). In 907, while Liu Rengong was at his retreat mansion at Mount Da'an (大安山), the Xuanwu Circuit (宣武, headquartered in modern Kaifeng, Henan) general Li Si'an (李思安) attacked You Prefecture; Liu Shouguang, whom Liu Rengong had expelled out of his household for having an affair with his concubine Lady Luo, took the opportunity to take over the defense of You and repelled Li's attack. He then sent Yuan and another officer, Li Xiaoxi (李小喜), to attack Liu Rengong at Mount Da'an, defeating and capturing him. He put Liu Rengong under house arrest and took over the circuit, and had Yuan kill all of his (Liu Shouguang's) brothers for him.

Liu Shouguang initially nominally submitted to the military governor of Xuanwu Circuit, Zhu Quanzhong, including after Zhu seized the Tang throne and established the Later Liang as its Emperor Taizu. Meanwhile, Liu Shouguang's brother Liu Shouwen, whom Liu Rengong had made the military governor of Yichang Circuit (義昌, headquartered in modern Cangzhou, Hebei), launched a campaign to try to free their father. In 909, Liu Shouwen, allied with Khitan and Tuyuhun tribal troops, made a major attack on Liu Shouguang and engaged him at the Battle of Jisu, initially defeating him. However, as he stood out in front his own troops, instructing them not to kill Liu Shouguang, Yuan saw him and charged toward him, capturing him. This caused Liu Shouwen's troops to collapse, and next year Yichang, under the defense of Liu Shouwen's son Liu Yanzuo, surrendered to Liu Shouguang.

In 913, by which time Liu Shouguang had declared himself emperor of an independent state of Yan and was subsequently under attack from the joint forces of Jin, Zhao, and Yiwu Circuit (義武, headquartered in modern Baoding, Hebei), Liu Shouguang sent Yuan north of the Yan Mountains to try to recruit reinforcement troops and encourage aid from the Khitan, as well to allow the warhorses to feed. Subsequently, the Jin general Li Siyuan (adoptive brother to Jin's prince Li Cunxu) attacked the region. The Yan general Gao Xinggui (高行珪) the prefect of Wu Prefecture (武州, in modern Zhangjiakou, Hebei) surrendered to Li Siyuan. When Yuan heard this, he counterattacked and put Wu Prefecture under siege. Li Siyuan came to Gao's aid, and Yuan withdrew. Li Siyuan gave chase, after eight battles in which Yuan was hit with arrows seven times but continued to battle, and was able to hit Li Siyuan with an arrow once, he ran out of strength and surrendered to Li Siyuan. Li Siyuan was impressed by Yuan's bravery, invited Yuan to a feast, and subsequently took Yuan into his army and made him an adoptive son.

== During Jin ==
In the subsequent campaigns that Li Siyuan conducted, Yuan Xingqin often followed him and fought well, such that he became well known in the Jin army. This attracted Li Cunxu's attention, and as Li Cunxu was trying to build a corps of elite guards around him, in or around 915, Li Cunxu requested Li Siyuan to send Yuan to him. Li Siyuan, albeit reluctant to give Yuan up, did so, and Li Cunxu made him a guard commander and bestowed on him the imperial surname of Li, as well as a new name of Shaorong. As, during his campaigns against archrival Later Liang, Li Cunxu liked to personally engage in battles, he was often putting himself in danger, and Li Shaorong had to save him on several occasions. In a particular battle at Panzhang (潘張, in modern Puyang, Henan) in 919, Li Cunxu became surrounded by several hundred Later Liang soldiers, but Li Shaorong, from afar, saw that his royal flag was surrounded, and fought into the encirclement to rescue him. After Li Cunxu was able to safely return to camp, he wept and stated to Li Shaorong, "I will share the honors and treasures with you." It was said that after that battle, Li Cunxu favored Li Shaorong over all other officers. He gave Li Shaorong the honorary title of acting Taifu (太傅) and made him the prefect of Xin Prefecture (忻州, in modern Xinzhou, Shanxi), although Li Shaorong appeared to continue to serve in his guard troops and never reported to Xin.

== During Later Tang ==
In 923, Li Cunxu declared himself the emperor of a new Later Tang (as its Emperor Zhuangzong). Later that year, he captured Later Liang's capital Daliang, and Later Liang's final emperor Zhu Zhen committed suicide, ending Later Liang. He made Li Shaorong the military governor (Jiedushi) of Wuning Circuit (武寧, headquartered in modern Xuzhou, Jiangsu). On one occasion, he held a feast for imperial officials inside the palace. As Li Shaorong's main office was not as high as some of the other officials attending, he had to sit outside the main group of feast attendees. During the feast, Emperor Zhuangzong began describing some of the anecdotes of the events of his campaigns; he looked around, not seeing Li Shaorong, and then stated, "Where is Li Shaorong?" The official responsible for the feast seating responded, "The imperial edict stated that this was a feast for the Shixiang [(使相, i.e., military governors who carried honorary chancellor titles)]. Li Shaorong's title did not fall within the group, and therefore he does not have a seat in the hall." Emperor Zhuangzong was displeased, and the next day bestowed the honorary chancellor title of Tong Zhongshu Menxia Pingzhangshi (同中書門下平章事) on Li Shaorong. It was also said that after this incident, he no longer held feasts for all officials, but only held feasts for officials who came from army ranks.

In 924, when the Anyi Circuit (安義, headquartered in modern Changzhi, Shanxi) officer Yang Li (楊立) mutinied and took control of its capital Lu Prefecture (潞州), Emperor Zhuangzong sent Li Siyuan to command the troops against the Anyi mutineers, with Li Shaorong and the officer Zhang Tingyun (張廷蘊) serving as his deputies. Zhang was able to quickly arrive at Lu and surprise the mutineers, capturing them and quelling the rebellion, before Li Siyuan and Li Shaorong could arrive, however.

After the Anyi campaign, Emperor Zhuangzong made Li Shaorong the military governor of Guide Circuit (歸德, headquartered in modern Shangqiu, Henan), but kept him at the capital Luoyang to command the imperial guards, and continued to treat him well, often visiting Li Shaorong's home with his mother Empress Dowager Cao and/or wife Empress Liu. When Li Shaorong's wife died in 925, Emperor Zhuangzong, while Li Shaorong was on duty in the palace, stated to him, "Do you plan to remarry? I will make the marriage proposal on your behalf." At that time, however, Empress Liu was jealous of a beautiful imperial consort whom Emperor Zhuangzong favored at the time and who had borne an imperial prince, so she pointed at the consort and stated, "If Your Imperial Majesty pities Shaorong, why not give her to him?" Emperor Zhuangzong was unable to immediately refuse, and the empress told Li Shaorong to get up and thank the emperor and then take the consort home. Emperor Zhuangzong was sufficiently displeased that he did not eat well for several days, but did not show the displeasure against Li Shaorong.

=== Involvement in the events of 926 ===
In 926, after the major general Guo Chongtao was killed on Empress Liu's orders (but Emperor Zhuangzong thereafter affirmed the orders), the soldiers over the realm were displeased, and there were many mutinies in the Later Tang realm. One of the mutinies was at the major city Yedu (鄴都, in modern Handan, Hebei), which concerned Emperor Zhuangzong. He initially was set to send the general Li Shaoqin to combat the mutiny, but Li Shaoqin (a former Later Liang general) drew his suspicions by selecting, on his staff, a large number of former Later Liang officers whom he favored, such that Emperor Zhuangzong cancelled Li Shaoqin's commission. At Empress Liu's suggestion, he sent Li Shaorong instead with 3,000 soldiers but the authorities to requisition soldiers from nearby circuits. When Li Shaorong arrived at Yedu, he initially tried to persuade the mutineers to surrender by informing them that the emperor would pardon them, but when the eunuch army monitor Shi Yanqiong (史彥瓊) cursed at the mutineers, the mutineers believed that they would not be spared, and so continued to resist, and Li Shaorong was unable to defeat them.

Emperor Zhuangzong considered heading to Yedu himself, but most of the official opposed, believing that he needed to stay at Luoyang so that the situation would not appear out of control. Instead, most officials recommend that he send Li Siyuan, as Li Siyuan was the most senior officer in the imperial army at the time. Emperor Zhuangzong, after some reluctance, agreed. When Li Siyuan's army got to Yedu, however, his soldiers mutinied as well and forced him to join the Yedu mutineers. Li Shaorong, seeing the situation, withdrew, and reported to Emperor Zhuangzong that Li Siyuan also mutinied. Li Siyuan, who had regained control of his army subsequently, tried to send letters to Emperor Zhuangzong proclaiming his continued loyalty, but the letters were intercepted by Li Shaorong and not delivered to the emperor. Further, when Emperor Zhuangzong, under belief that Li Siyuan had rebelled but was doing so under stress, tried to send Li Siyuan's son Li Congshen, who was serving as an imperial guard officer, to Li Siyuan to try to persuade him to get his father to resubmit. When Li Congshen got underway, however, Li Shaorong intercepted him and initially wanted to kill him, only sparing him when Li Congshen offered to return to Luoyang to defend the emperor. (Emperor Zhuangzong subsequently adopted Li Congshen as a son, changing his name to Li Jijing.)

With his communications with Emperor Zhuangzong cut off, Li Siyuan decided to act against Emperor Zhuangzong by taking Daliang. Meanwhile, Li Shaorong returned to Luoyang and also encouraged Emperor Zhuangzong to head east to secure Daliang and not allow the mutineers to seize it. Emperor Zhuangzong agreed. While heading toward Daliang, he again tried to send Li Jijing to Li Siyuan to try to reestablish communications. However, when Li Jijing headed toward Li Siyuan's camp, he was again intercepted by Li Shaorong, who executed him.

Li Siyuan was able to capture Daliang before Emperor Zhuangzong could arrive. Thwarted, Emperor Zhuangzong returned to Luoyang. Depressed at the turn of events, he turned to Li Shaorong and the other imperial guard officers, stating, "Ever since you started serving me, we have shared both disasters and fortunes together. Now I have reached this point. Does none of you have an idea how to save me?" Li Shaorong thereafter led a group of officers in cutting off their hair and swearing continued loyalty. Some officials suggested that Emperor Zhuangzong take control of the banks of Si River (汜水, flowing through modern Zhengzhou, Henan) and wait for reinforcement (in the form of an army commanded by his son Li Jiji the Prince of Wei, who was returning from former Former Shu territory after Later Tang had conquered Former Shu in 925). Emperor Zhuangzong agreed. However, before he could depart Luoyang, the officer Guo Congqian (郭從謙) mutinied at Luoyang, and in the ensuing battle, Emperor Zhuangzong was killed by a stray arrow. Li Shaorong fled the capital, initially with Empress Liu and Emperor Zhuangzong's brother Li Cunwo (李存渥) the Prince of Shen, but apparently soon departed from them, for he was then described to be heading toward Hezhong Circuit (河中, headquartered in modern Yuncheng, Shanxi) to join another brother of Emperor Zhuangzong's, Li Cunba (李存霸) the Prince of Yong, but on the way, his soldiers abandoned him except for several cavalry soldiers. When he reached Pinglu (平陸, in modern Yuncheng), the local officials arrested him, broke his legs, and delivered him to Luoyang (which Li Siyuan, by that point, had taken control of, and claimed the title of regent).

When Li Shaorong arrived at Luoyang, Li Siyuan personally rebuked him, asking him, "How have I wronged you that you killed my son?" Li Shaorong stared at Li Siyuan and responded, "How has the deceased emperor wronged you?" Li Siyuan ordered him executed by decapitation, and changed his name back to Yuan Xingqin.

The Song dynasty historian Ouyang Xiu, in his New History of the Five Dynasties, commented thus about Yuan:

Alas! A death is to be honored when the righteousness of the dying person would allow him to not crave death. It has long been said that a subject whom the state can rely on would live when his lord lives and die when his lord dies. When the army of Emperor Mingzong [(i.e., Li Siyuan, who later took the Later Tang throne as Emperor Mingzong)] at Wei Prefecture [(魏州, i.e., Yedu)], the other generals all did not know what was the situation with him, but Yuan Xingqin insisted on reporting him as having rebelled. He further killed Emperor Mingzong's son Congjing [(i.e., Li Jijing, whose name Emperor Mingzong later posthumously changed to Congjing)]. As for his cutting his hair to swear loyalty, while the faithfulness and the spirit are worth praising, when Emperor Zhuangzong died, he could not kill himself and instead fled to try to live himself, eventually leading to his capture and execution. While his words did not show submission, he did not die in a way pursuant to what he willed. How can this death be honored?

== Notes and references ==
- History of the Five Dynasties, vol. 70.
- New History of the Five Dynasties, vol. 25.
- Zizhi Tongjian, vols. 266, 267, 268, 269, 270, 271, 272, 273, 274, 275.
