= Liu Yanzuo =

Liu Yanzuo (Chinese: 劉延祚) was a son of the late Chinese Tang dynasty/early Five Dynasties and Ten Kingdoms period warlord Liu Shouwen, the military governor (Jiedushi) of Yichang Circuit (義昌, headquartered in modern Cangzhou, Hebei), who tried to defend Yichang against the attacks of his uncle Liu Shouguang after his father was captured by his uncle in 909.

Little is known about Liu Yanzuo personally. His grandfather Liu Rengong had taken over the nearby, larger Lulong Circuit (盧龍, headquartered in modern Beijing) in 895, and had sent Liu Shouwen to conquer Yichang in 898, leaving Liu Shouwen in command there. In 907, Liu Shouguang overthrew Liu Rengong and put him under house arrest, taking over Lulong. Hearing of this, Liu Shouwen launched an attack on Liu Shouguang, and the war between the brothers continued for several years.

In 909, Liu Shouwen was captured in battle by Liu Shouguang's officer Yuan Xingqin. Liu Shouguang put him under house arrest and tried to advance to take over Yichang. Liu Shouwen's secretaries Lü Yan (呂兗) and Sun He (孫鶴) supported Liu Yanzuo as Liu Shouwen's successor and tried to put up a defense at Yichang's capital Cang Prefecture (滄州). Initially, the defense held even after Liu Shouguang had Liu Shouwen taken to the frontline to show that he had been captured. However, soon the food supplies ran out, and the army resorted to cannibalizing the weaker people in the community for food. In spring 910, Liu Yanzuo surrendered. Liu Shouguang sent his son (Liu Yanzuo's cousin) Liu Jiwei (劉繼威) to Yichang to take over for Liu Yanzuo, while having Liu Yanzuo and his staff members taken back to Lulong's capital You Prefecture (幽州). Historical accounts do not describe Liu Yanzuo's fate, even though it explicitly stated that Liu Shouguang killed Lü and his household while sparing Sun. (Liu Yanzuo's father Liu Shouwen would remain under house arrest for some time, and then was assassinated on secret orders from Liu Shouguang.)
