= Liu Shouwen =

Liu Shouwen (Chinese: 劉守文) (died 910) was a warlord who ruled Yichang Circuit (義昌, headquartered in modern Cangzhou, Hebei) as its military governor (jiedushi) late in the Chinese Tang dynasty and early during Tang's succeeding Later Liang state. He was a son of Liu Rengong the military governor of the larger Lulong Circuit (盧龍, headquartered in modern Beijing) and followed his father's orders. After his father was overthrown and put under house arrest by his younger brother Liu Shouguang, he tried to attack Liu Shouguang, but was captured in battle and subsequently killed by his brother.

== Background ==
It is not known when Liu Shouwen was born. His father Liu Rengong was a Lulong Circuit officer who took over the circuit with the military support of the major warlord Li Keyong the military governor of Hedong Circuit (河東, headquartered in modern Taiyuan, Shanxi) in 895, but then turned against Li in 897 and became an independent warlord. Liu Shouwen appeared to be the oldest son, and it is known that he was older than his brother Liu Shouguang, and that he had a sister who married the Lulong officer Dan Keji (單可及). (A sister of Liu Shouwen's was later said to be the mother of the officer Wang Sitong, but it is unclear whether she was a different sister (which appeared likely) or the same sister (who might have married Wang Sitong's father after Dan's death)).

The first historical reference to Liu Shouwen's acts was in 898, at which time Liu Rengong was embroiled in a dispute over salt rights with Lu Yanwei, then the military governor of Yichang. Liu Rengong thus sent Liu Shouwen to attack Yichang's capital Cang Prefecture (滄州). Lu, unable to withstand his attack, abandoned the circuit and fled to Xuanwu Circuit (宣武, headquartered in modern Kaifeng, Henan). Liu Rengong thus took over the three prefectures of Yichang (Cang, Jing (景州, in modern Cangzhou), and De (德州, in modern Dezhou, Shandong) Prefectures) and commissioned Liu Shouwen as the acting military governor. He sent a request to then-reigning Emperor Zhaozong to grant Liu Shouwen banners and rods of a military governor (i.e., to make Liu Shouwen military governor). Emperor Zhaozong initially refused. Liu Rengong, who had then become arrogant and was planning to take over the entire region north of the Yellow River, responded to Emperor Zhaozong's eunuch messenger, "I myself have banners and rods. All I want are the authentic colors from [the imperial capital] Chang'an. Why is it that I made so many petitions and still do not receive them? Tell them this!" However, Emperor Zhaozong did eventually relent and make Liu Shouwen the military governor of Yichang.

== As military governor of Yichang ==
=== During Tang ===
In 899, Liu Rengong launched his plan with 100,000 soldiers from Lulong and Yichang Circuits, heading first toward Bei Prefecture (貝州, in modern Xingtai, Hebei), which belonged to Weibo Circuit (魏博, headquartered in modern Handan, Hebei). He captured Bei Prefecture and slaughtered its people, and then headed toward Weibo's capital Wei Prefecture (魏州). Weibo's military governor Luo Shaowei sought aid from Xuanwu's military governor Zhu Quanzhong, and Zhu sent his generals Li Si'an (李思安) and Zhang Cunjing (張存敬) to aid Luo. Liu Rengong made Liu Shouwen and Dan Keji his forward commanders, stating to Liu Shouwen, "You are 10 times as brave as Li Si'an. You should first capture him, and then capture Luo Shaowei." Liu Shouwen and Dan subsequently engaged Li, but were ambushed in a trap set by Li and his subordinate Yuan Xiangxian. 30,000 Lulong soldiers were killed, as was Dan; Liu Shouwen barely escaped. Subsequently, a joint counterattack by Xuanwu and Weibo forces further crushed Liu Rengong's main force, and Liu Rengong and Liu Shouwen fled back to their own territory.

In 900, Zhu sent his general Ge Congzhou to attack Liu Rengong. Ge first captured De Prefecture and killed its prefect Fu Gonghe (傅公和), and then put Liu Shouwen under siege at Cang Prefecture. Liu Rengong's own efforts to try to aid his son were initially unsuccessful, but persuaded Li Keyong to try to divert the Xuanwu army's attention by attacking Xing (邢州, in modern Xingtai) and Ming (洺州, in modern Handan), and Wang Rong the military governor of Chengde Circuit (成德, headquartered in modern Shijiazhuang, Hebei) also urged peace between the two sides. Further, Ge's army ran into rainstorms, and Zhu ordered him to withdraw.

In 906, Luo, who was fearful of the traditional power that the Weibo headquarter guard corps had in the circuit, slaughtered them with Zhu's support. The other troops were shocked by Luo's actions, and some of the soldiers rebelled under the leadership of the officer Shi Renyu (史仁遇), who took over Gaotang (高唐, in modern Liaocheng, Shandong) and claimed to be acting military governor. He sought aid from Hedong and Yichang. In response, Liu Shouwen attacked Weibo's Bei and Ji (冀州, in modern Hengshui, Hebei) Prefectures. When Zhu sent Xuanwu troops to reinforce Ji's defense, however, Liu Shouwen withdrew. (Meanwhile, the Xuanwu officers Li Zhouyi (李周彝) and Fu Daozhao (符道昭) captured Gaotang and killed Shi.)

Later in the year, after helping Luo to put out the remaining rebellions in Weibo, Zhu attacked north and put Cang Prefecture under siege. Liu Rengong's attempts to aid Liu Shouwen were unsuccessful, and the city was soon running out of food, causing the people to resort to eating dirt or cannibalizing each other. When Zhu tried to persuade Liu Shouwen to surrender, Liu Shouwen responded respectfully, "I, your servant, am a son to the ruler of You Prefecture [(幽州, Lulong's capital)]. The Prince of Liang [(i.e., Zhu)] is trying to get the entire domain to submit to his righteousness. If a son rebels against his father and surrenders, why would you want such a follower?" Zhu admired him for his words, and slowed down the siege. Later in the year, after hearing news that Ding Hui the military governor of Zhaoyi Circuit (昭義, headquartered in modern Changzhi, Shanxi) had submitted to Li Keyong, Zhu prepared to withdraw from Cang Prefecture. As Zhu had had much food supply shipped to the front, he was ordering that the food supply be burned or sunk into the water. Liu Shouwen wrote Zhu:

You, Prince, are forgiving your servant's crimes and lifting the siege for the sake of the people. This is your grace, Prince. The tens of thousands of people in this city have not eaten for several months. Instead of burning the food into smoke or sinking it into mud, I am begging you for the remainder so that they can survive.

Because of Liu Shouwen's request, Zhu left some of the food untouched, and after he withdrew, the people of Cang Prefecture were able to survive because of this.

=== During Later Liang ===
In 907, Zhu Quanzhong had Emperor Zhaozong's son and successor Emperor Ai yield the throne to him, ending Tang and starting a new Later Liang as its Emperor Taizu. While several warlords (Li Keyong, Li Maozhen, Yang Wo, and Wang Jian) refused to recognize the Later Liang emperor and most other regional governors did so, the historical records did not explicitly state what position Liu Rengong and, by extension, Liu Shouwen, took publicly. However, in late 907, Liu Shouwen's younger brother Liu Shouguang, who had been rebuked by Liu Rengong and expelled out of the household after having an affair with one of Liu Rengong's concubines, carried out a coup, took over Lulong, put Liu Rengong under house arrest, and formally submitted to Later Liang. Upon hearing of the coup, Liu Shouwen launched a campaign against his brother, which stalemated. With the brothers battling, Luo Shaowei, who recognized the Later Liang emperor, wrote a letter to Liu Shouwen urging him to submit to Later Liang as well. Liu Shouwen, fearing an attack from Later Liang, agreed to do so and sent his son Liu Yanyou (劉延祐) to the Later Liang imperial government to serve as a hostage. Emperor Taizu was pleased and bestowed the honorary chancellor title Zhongshu Ling (中書令) on Liu Shouwen.

In 908, Liu Shouwen launched another attack on Liu Shouguang. Liu Shouguang sought aid from Li Cunxu the Prince of Jin (Li Keyong's son and successor), and Li Cunxu sent aid. Liu Shouwen was subsequently repelled by Liu Shouguang at Lutai Base (蘆台軍, in modern Cangzhou) and Yutian (玉田, in modern Tangshan, Hebei), and he withdrew.

In summer 909, Liu Shouwen launched another attack, this time after sending gifts to persuade Khitan and Tuyuhun tribes to fight on his side against Liu Shouguang as well. He engaged Liu Shouguang at the Battle of Jisu (雞蘇, in modern Tianjin), and initially defeated his brother but during the victory, Liu Shouwen declared to his troops, "Do not kill my brother!" As he did, Liu Shouguang's general Yuan Xingqin, who recognized Liu Shouwen, charged toward him and captured him, and subsequently, the battle turned into a rout against the Yichang troops. Liu Shouguang put Liu Shouwen under arrest and headed toward Cang Prefecture. Liu Shouwen's assistants Lü Yan (呂兗) and Sun He (孫鶴) initially supported Liu Shouwen's son Liu Yanzuo as his successor and put up a defense, and the defense held, even after Liu Shouguang took Liu Shouwen to the city to show the troops that Liu Shouwen had been captured. The food supplies ran out, and the army resorted to slaughtering the weaker residents for food. In spring 910, Liu Yanzuo surrendered, and Liu Shouguang had his son Liu Jiwei (劉繼威) take over Yichang. Liu Shouguang soon after had Liu Shouwen assassinated, then blamed the assassination on the killer and executed the killer.
