= Ding Hui (general) =

Tang Chinese general

- Born: Shouchun
- Died: 910/911; Taiyuan
- Military career
- Allegiance: Qi (−882); Tang dynasty (882–907); Jin (907–)
- Rank: Jiedushi

Ding Hui (丁會; died 910/911), courtesy name Daoyin (道隱), was a general who, for most of his career, served under Zhu Quanzhong (formerly known as Zhu Wen) while Zhu was a major warlord late in the Chinese Tang dynasty. In 906, as Zhu was planning on seizing the Tang throne and establishing his own dynasty (which he eventually did, establishing Later Liang as its Emperor Taizu), Ding defected to Zhu's rival Li Keyong the military governor of Hedong Circuit (河東, headquartered in modern Taiyuan, Shanxi) and thereafter served in Li Keyong's state of Jin until his death.

== Background ==
It is not known when Ding Hui was born, but it is known that he was from Shouchun (壽春, in modern Lu'an, Anhui). His father's name was Ding Ji (丁季). In his youth, Ding Hui was said to be frivolous and inattentive to proper conduct. Instead of farming (which, implicitly, appeared to have been his family's profession), he followed professional mourners and learned their songs. When he grew older, the Tang realm was then overrun by agrarian rebellions, and he gathered strong young men around him to engage in banditry, gaining some acclaim in the process. He eventually joined the army of the major agrarian rebel Huang Chao, and came to serve under Huang's officer Zhu Wen.

== Service under Zhu Quanzhong ==
After Zhu Wen later defected to the Tang cause and was made the military governor (jiedushi) of Xuanwu Circuit (宣武, headquartered in modern Kaifeng, Henan) (with his name changed to the Tang-bestowed name of Quanzhong), Ding Hui became the commander of his headquarters guards. In 888, when Zhang Quanyi the mayor of Henan Municipality (河南, i.e., the region of the eastern capital Luoyang) turned against his ally Li Hanzhi the military governor of Heyang Circuit (河陽, headquartered in modern Jiaozuo, Henan) and expelled Li from Heyang, Li sought aid from Zhu's major rival Li Keyong the military governor of Hedong Circuit. Li Keyong sent his officer Kang Junli to aid Li Hanzhi in trying to recapture Heyang Circuit; in turn, Zhang sought aid from Zhu, who sent Ding, Ge Congzhou, and Niu Cunjie (牛存節) to aid Zhang. They defeated Kang and his army, forcing him to withdraw. Zhu made Ding the acting military governor of Heyang after the victory. Later in the year, Ding also sought off another attempt by Li Hanzhi to recapture Heyang.

In 890, when Zhu asked Luo Hongxin the military governor of Weibo Circuit (魏博, headquartered in modern Handan, Hebei) for permission to go through Luo's territory to attack Hedong, Luo refused. Zhu reacted by sending Ding, Ge, Pang Shigu (龐師古), and Huo Cun (霍存) to attack Weibo. They won a series of battles, as did Zhu himself, against Weibo. In 891, Luo sued for peace, submitting a tribute of money. Zhu agreed, and it was said that from that point on, Weibo became a vassal of Zhu's.

Later in 891, under Zhu's orders, Ding attacked Su Prefecture (宿州, in modern Suzhou, Anhui), leading to Su's prefect Zhang Yun (張筠) surrendering to him. Later in the year, Ding and Zhang Guiba (張歸霸) engaged Zhu Jin the military governor of Taining Circuit (泰寧, headquartered in modern Jining, Shandong), who had been locked in years of warfare with Zhu Quanzhong; they defeated him and inflicted great casualties on his troops; he himself barely escaped. While most of Ding's subsequent battles were not spelled out in history, it was said that he had great contributions in Zhu Quanzhong's victorious campaigns against the rebel emperor Qin Zongquan whose capital was at Cai Prefecture (蔡州, in modern Zhumadian, Henan), Shi Pu the military governor of Ganhua Circuit (感化, headquartered in modern Xuzhou, Jiangsu), and Zhu Jin and his cousin Zhu Xuan the military governor of Tianping Circuit (天平, headquartered in modern Tai'an, Shandong), helping Zhu Quanzhong to greatly expand his territory.

In 899, under Zhu's recommendation, several of his officers, including Ding, who had been made acting military governors, were made full military governors of their circuits. Under these recommendations, Li Hanzhi (who had, in 898, turned from his allegiance to Li Keyong to Zhu and seized Lu Prefecture (潞州, in modern Changzhi, Shanxi), the capital of Zhaoyi Circuit (昭義), which had been under the control of Li Keyong's subordinate Xue Zhiqin (薛志勤) until Xue's recent death) was made the military governor of Zhaoyi, and later in the year, Zhu sent Ding to help Li Hanzhi recapture Ze Prefecture (澤州, in modern Jincheng, Shanxi), which Li Hanzhi had held but which had been captured by Li Keyong's adoptive nephew Li Sizhao. Ding was able to capture Ze Prefecture, and when Li Keyong's officer Li Junqing (李君慶) then put Lu Prefecture under siege, Ding and another subordinate of Zhu's, Zhang Cunjing (張存敬), came to Li Hanzhi's aid and defeated Li Junqing, lifting the siege. Subsequently, when Li Hanzhi became very ill, Zhu made him the military governor of Heyang and Ding the military governor of Zhaoyi. (Li Hanzhi died shortly after.) However, then, for reasons unclear in history, Zhu sent Ge to defend Lu Prefecture instead of Ding, and, after another officer under Zhu, He Delun (賀德倫), was defeated by Li Sizhao, Ge withdrew, allowing Li Keyong to retain Zhaoyi. Not until 901, when, in the aftermaths of a major attack Zhu launched on Li Keyong's capital Taiyuan, Li Keyong's subordinate Meng Qian (孟遷) surrendered Zhaoyi to Zhu, that Ding was actually able to take over Zhaoyi Circuit and govern it. Subsequently, then-reigning Emperor Zhaozong formally commissioned Ding as the military governor of Zhaoyi and Meng as the military governor of Heyang.

== Defection to and service under Li Keyong and Li Cunxu ==
In 904, Zhu forced Emperor Zhaozong, who was then under his physical control, to move the capital from Chang'an to Luoyang. Later in the year, he further had Emperor Zhaozong assassinated and replaced with his son Emperor Ai. When the news of Emperor Zhaozong's death reached Zhaoyi, Ding had his army bear mourning clothes and wept for a long time. Thereafter, in 906, when Zhu was attacking Liu Rengong the military governor of Lulong Circuit (盧龍, headquartered in modern Beijing) and Li Keyong tried to aid Liu by attacking Zhaoyi again to divert Zhu's troops, Ding surrendered the circuit. He stated to Li Keyong:

It is not that I, Ding Hui, am incapable of defending against the attack. It is that the Prince of Liang [(i.e., Zhu)] has humiliated the Tang imperial house. Even though I was greatly blessed by his favors in rising to my position, I cannot bear his acts. Therefore, I submit to you.

Li Keyong treated him with great respect, putting him in honored position above other officers, but made Li Sizhao the acting military governor of Zhaoyi to replace him. Zhu, upon hearing news of Ding's surrender, abandoned his campaign against Liu and withdrew. In retribution, he also killed Ding Zhihang (丁知沆), one of Ding Hui's seven sons.

In 907, Zhu had Emperor Ai yield the throne to him, ending the Tang dynasty and starting a new Later Liang as its Emperor Taizu. Li Keyong and several other warlords inimical to Zhu refused to recognize him as emperor. Li Keyong maintained the Tang era name (and is commonly viewed as the ruler of his own state from this point on, under the Tang-bestowed title of Prince of Jin). Late in 907, Zhu ordered Liang forces to put Lu Prefecture under siege, but Li Keyong himself, being severely ill, was unable to render aid to Li Sizhao. He died early in 908 and was succeeded as the Prince of Jin by his son Li Cunxu. Li Cunxu planned a major campaign to save Li Sizhao, and he put Ding in overall command of the operations — although, in the subsequent victory over Liang troops that lifted the siege on Lu, it was Li Cunxu himself, along with Zhou Dewei, who achieved the victory, with Ding's role unclear. Ding died in late 910 or early 911, and, after Li Cunxu established his own Later Tang and destroyed Later Liang in 923, he bestowed posthumous honors on Ding.

== Notes and references ==
- History of the Five Dynasties, vol. 59.
- New History of the Five Dynasties, vol. 44.
- Zizhi Tongjian, vols. 257, 258, 261, 262, 265, 266.
