= Liu Shouguang =

10th-century Chinese warlord

Liu Shouguang 劉守光
- Reign: September 8, 911 – January 4, 914
- Died: February 16, 914
Full name
- Family name: Líu (劉); Given name: Shǒuguāng (守光)
Era name and dates
- Yìngtiān (應天): September 8, 911 – January 4, 914
- Dynasty: Yan

Liu Shouguang (Chinese: 劉守光) (died February 16, 914) was a warlord early in the Chinese Five Dynasties and Ten Kingdoms period who controlled Lulong (盧龍, headquartered in modern Beijing) and Yichang (義昌, headquartered in modern Cangzhou, Hebei) Circuits, after seizing control from his father Liu Rengong and defeating his brother Liu Shouwen. He claimed the title of Emperor of Yan in 911, but was subsequently defeated and executed by Li Cunxu the Prince of Jin, who absorbed Yan into his Jin state.

== Background ==
It is not known when Liu Shouguang was born. He was a son of Liu Rengong, who became military governor (jiedushi) of Lulong Circuit in 895 after Liu Rengong's then-liege Li Keyong the military governor of Hedong Circuit (河東, headquartered in modern Taiyuan, Shanxi) conquered Lulong Circuit in 894. Liu Rengong eventually broke away from Li and became an independent warlord in 897. It is not known when Liu Shouguang's birth was in relations to these events, either, but it is known that another son of Liu Rengong's, Liu Shouwen, was older than he was, while another son, Liu Shouqi (劉守奇), was younger. In or around 903, Liu Rengong made him the prefect of Ping Prefecture (平州, in modern Qinhuangdao, Hebei). On an occasion, when the Khitan chieftain Yelü Abaoji sent his brother-in-law Shulü Abo (述律阿缽) to attack Ping, Liu Shouguang pretended to be suing for peace with the Khitan and held a feast for Shulü and the other key Khitan officers; during the feast, he had the soldiers that he had hidden around the feast site seize the Khitan officers and took them back into the city, forcing the Khitan to ransom them.

Sometime in or before 907, Liu Shouguang entered into an affair with Liu Rengong's favorite concubine Lady Luo. When Liu Rengong found out, Liu Rengong caned Liu Shouguang, threw him out of the household, and no longer recognized him as a son. In summer 907, when the major warlord Zhu Quanzhong the military governor of Xuanwu Circuit (宣武, headquartered in modern Kaifeng, Henan) sent the general Li Si'an (李思安) to attack Lulong's capital You Prefecture (幽州), Liu Rengong happened to be at his vacation mansion at Mount Da'an (大安山), and the city was unprepared for Li Si'an's attack and almost fell. Liu Shouguang organized an army and defended the city; he then defeated Li Si'an and forced the Xuanwu army to withdraw. Liu Shouguang thereafter claimed the title of military governor and sent his officers Yuan Xingqin and Li Xiaoxi (李小喜) to attack Liu Rengong's mansion at Mount Da'an. Liu Rengong tried to resist, but Li Xiaoxi defeated and captured him. Liu Shouguang put Liu Rengong under house arrest, and killed many of the staff members and household servants that he did not like. In response, Liu Shouqi, Liu Rengong's grandson Wang Sitong, and the officer Li Chengyue (李承約) fled to Hedong.

== As Later Liang vassal ==
Liu Shouguang subsequently submitted a petition to Zhu Quanzhong—who, in fall 907, took the throne from the Tang dynasty's last emperor Emperor Ai and established a new Later Liang as its Emperor Taizu—requesting to be a vassal, using only the title of acting military governor in the petition. In fall 908, Emperor Taizu commissioned him as the military governor of Lulong and gave him the honorary chancellor designation Tong Zhongshu Menxia Pingzhangshi (同中書門下平章事). Emperor Taizu also created him the Prince of Hejian, and then upgraded the title to Prince of Yan in 908.

Meanwhile, Liu Shouwen, who was then the military governor of Yichang Circuit and who had heard of Liu Shouguang's overthrow of Liu Rengong, also submitted to Later Liang as a vassal and launched an army to attack Liu Shouguang. The brothers' armies stalemated for some time. During this confrontation, Liu Shouguang was aided by Li Keyong's son and successor Li Cunxu the Prince of Jin. In 909, the brothers again engaged each other at the Battle of Jisu (雞蘇, in modern Tianjin). Liu Shouwen initially prevailed in the battle, but during the initial victory, Liu Shouwen declared to his troops, "Do not kill my brother!" As he did, Yuan Xingqin, who recognized Liu Shouwen, charged toward him and captured him, and subsequently, the battle turned into a rout against the Yichang troops. Liu Shouguang put Liu Shouwen under arrest and headed toward Cang Prefecture. Liu Shouwen's assistants Lü Yan (呂兗) and Sun He (孫鶴) initially supported Liu Shouwen's son Liu Yanzuo as his successor and put up a defense, and the defense held, even after Liu Shouguang took Liu Shouwen to the city to show the troops that Liu Shouwen had been captured. The food supplies ran out, and the army resorted to slaughtering the weaker residents for food. In spring 910, Liu Yanzuo surrendered, and Liu Shouguang had his son Liu Jiwei (劉繼威) take over Yichang. He killed Lü and slaughtered Lü's household, but pardoned Sun and made Sun a chief strategist.

Liu Shouguang soon after had Liu Shouwen assassinated, then blamed the assassination on the killer and executed the killer. He also submitted a petition in Liu Rengong's name requesting retirement; Emperor Taizu approved it and bestowed on Liu Rengong the honorary title Taishi (太師). Emperor Taizu also gave Liu Shouguang the additional title of military governor of Yichang while commissioning Liu Jiwei as acting military governor. (Meanwhile, Liu Shouguang, while a Later Liang vassal, was trying to play both sides of the Later Liang/Jin enmity, as he submitted a petition stating to Emperor Taizu that he would assist in destroying Li Cunxu, and yet also wrote Li Cunxu stating that he would jointly attack Later Liang with Li Cunxu.)

In 910, Emperor Taizu, doubting the loyalty of two other Later Liang vassals—Wang Rong the military governor of Wushun Circuit (武順, headquartered in modern Shijiazhuang, Hebei, also known as Zhao) and Wang Chuzhi the military governor of Yiwu Circuit (義武, headquartered in modern Baoding, Hebei)—had his officers Du Tingyin (杜廷隱) and Ding Yanhui (丁延徽) seize Wushun's Shen (深州) and Ji (冀州) Prefectures (both in modern Hengshui, Hebei) by trick and then prepared to have his general Wang Jingren attack and take over Wushun and Yiwu. In response, Wang Rong sought aid from both Li Cunxu and Liu Shouguang. Li agreed and immediately launched an army to join forces with Zhao and Yiwu in resisting Later Liang, while Liu refused—believing that he could gain an advantage in seeing the Later Liang and Zhao armies battle each other, despite Sun's urging that he go to Zhao's aid and pointing out that he was giving Li an opening to gain Zhao's and Yiwu's allegiance.

In spring 911, the joint Jin/Zhao/Yiwu army under Li's command crushed the Later Liang army under Wang Jingren's command at Boxiang (柏鄉, in modern Xingtai, Hebei). Originally, the joint army attacked south further, intending to also take Later Liang's Baoyi (保義, headquartered in modern Xingtai) and Tianxiong (天雄, headquartered in modern Handan, Hebei) Circuits, but as they advanced, Liu Shouguang made noises about joining the fight. Li was concerned that Liu would attack him from his back, and so abandoned the operations.

It was said that, after Liu's conquest of Yichang, he believed himself to have divine help, and became both licentious and cruel. His methods of torture included putting people in iron cages and then heating the cages, and brushing their faces with iron brushes. Against Sun's advice, he also began to have designs to take imperial title. He first sent a letter to Wang Rong and Wang Chuzhi, asking them to support him to take the title of Shangfu (尚父, "imperial father," a very honorary title rarely given and only given to the most senior officials). When Wang Rong informed Li of this, Li initially wanted to attack Liu right away, but the Jin generals believed that offering Liu the title would make him even more arrogant and more defeatable. Li thus signed a joint petition with Wang Rong, Wang Chuzhi, and three other governors under Li's command—Zhou Dewei the military governor of Zhenwu Circuit (振武, headquartered in modern Datong, Shanxi), Li Sizhao the military governor of Zhaoyi Circuit (昭義, headquartered in modern Changzhi, Shanxi), and Song Yao (宋瑤) the defender of Tiande Circuit (天德, headquartered in modern Hohhot, Inner Mongolia)—offering Liu the Shangfu title. Liu then submitted their petition to Emperor Taizu, stating to Emperor Taizu if Emperor Taizu made him the supreme commander of the circuits to the north, Li Cunxu and Wang Rong would fall into line. Emperor Taizu, while knowing that Liu was inflating himself, thereafter sent the emissaries Wang Tong (王瞳) and Shi Yanqun (史彥群) to bestow him the title of surveyor (采訪使, Caifangshi) of the circuits north of the Yellow River.

When Liu Shouguang subsequently had his staff members prepare for a ceremony for him to take the Shangfu and Caifangshi titles, he noticed that the ceremony lacked sacrifices to heaven and declaration of a new era name—which the staff members pointed out were inappropriate given that he would still be a Later Liang imperial subject. In anger, Liu threw the ceremonial agenda and stated:

I have the territory of 2,000 square li and 300,000 armored soldiers. If I were going to be the Son of Heaven north of the Yellow River, who can stop me? Why should I even assume the title of Shangfu?

Liu ordered the immediate preparation of an imperial enthronement ceremony. He also threw Wang Tong and Shi, as well as the emissaries that the other circuits sent to attend the ceremony, into jail, but then had them released. His staff members had misgivings about his assuming the throne, so he publicly displayed a large axe, stating, "Anyone who dares to speak against it will be beheaded!" When Sun nevertheless did so, he had Sun bound and flayed, and ordered his soldiers to eat Sun's flesh. When Sun continued to protest while being flayed, he stuffed Sun's mouth with dirt and then beheaded Sun. He then assumed the title of Emperor of Yan.

== As emperor ==
Liu Shouguang's arrogance continued after taking imperial title; for example, when Li Cunxu, in order to further fan his arrogance by sending his official Li Chengxun (李承勳) to congratulate him, he insisted that Li, rather than acting like an emissary on behalf of an equal state, kneel down to him and declare himself a subject. In anger, Liu imprisoned Li Chengxun and later killed him. He also tattooed the faces of all of his soldiers. Further, he then launched an army and postured to attack Yiwu, despite the opposition of his official Feng Dao, whom he imprisoned. (Feng later escaped and fled to Jin.) When he then attacked Yiwu, Wang Chuzhi sought aid from Jin. In response, Li Cunxu sent Zhou Dewei to rendezvous with the Zhao officer Wang Deming (Wang Rong's adoptive son) and the Yiwu officer Cheng Yan (程巖) in spring 912 to attack Yan.

Liu Shouguang sought aid from Later Liang's Emperor Taizu, who did decide to personally lead an army to aid him. However, the Later Liang emperor was defeated by the Jin general Li Cunshen and forced to withdraw, and, as he then fell seriously ill, was not able to again launch another army to come to Liu's aid. (He was assassinated later in the year by his son Zhu Yougui the Prince of Ying, who then took the throne, further ending any hopes of Later Liang aid for Yan.) Meanwhile, Liu Jiwei, who was just as violent as Liu Shouguang, was assassinated by his commander Zhang Wanjin (張萬進), who then submitted to Later Liang.

In subsequent battles throughout 912 and early 913, Zhou and the other Jin generals took Yan cities one by one, and in the process captured the Yan generals Shan Tinggui (單廷珪) and Yuan Xingqin, greatly cutting into Yan morale. With his city-to-city campaign successful, by summer 912, Zhou was putting You Prefecture under siege. When Liu sent a humbly-worded letter begging for peace, Zhou mocked him, stating:

The Emperor of the Great Yan has not yet offered sacrifices to heaven and earth. Why is he sounding like a woman? I received my orders to attack the guilty one. It is not my responsibility to talk about alliances and peace.

Zhou thus turned down Liu's overture, but after Liu again begged, he relayed Liu's offer of peace to Li Cunxu. Meanwhile, Liu Shouqi and Yang Shihou entered Zhao territory to try to force Zhou to give up his campaign to save Zhao. Zhou sent Wang Deming back to Zhao to aid the Jin generals Li Cunshen and Shi Jiantang (史建瑭) in defending Zhao, but did not relent on his siege. When Li Cunxu subsequently sent Zhang Chengye to You Prefecture to discuss the status of the siege with Zhou, Liu Shouguang offered to surrender to Zhang, but Zhang refused, citing Liu Shouguang's history of not following his own words. Zhou subsequently repelled a counterattack by Liu Shouguang.

By winter 913, You Prefecture was in desperate straits. Liu Shouguang offered to surrender if Li Cunxu personally came to accept his surrender. Zhou thus relayed this offer to Li Cunxu. When Li Cunxu arrived and promised Liu Shouguang that his life would be spared if he did surrender, Liu Shouguang hesitated and did not do so. However, Li Xiaoxi, who had advocated to Liu that he hold out against the Jin attack, then surrendered and revealed to the Jin army the desperate situation the city was in, the Jin army launched its fiercest attack yet, and the city fell. Liu Shouguang fled.

== Death ==
Liu Shouguang, taking his wives Empress Li and Empress Zhu, as well as his sons Liu Jixun (劉繼珣), Liu Jifang (劉繼方), and Liu Jizuo (劉繼祚) with him, tried to flee to Cang Prefecture, where Liu Shouqi had replaced Zhang Wanjin as the military governor of Yichang (which Later Liang renamed Shunhua Circuit). However, in the cold, he suffered frostbite, and also lost his way. When they reached Yanle (燕樂, in modern Beijing), they had spent several days without food. He sent Empress Zhu to go beg for food among the commoners. When she begged from one Zhang Shizao (張師造), Zhang realized who Empress Zhu was, and forced her to reveal Liu Shouguang's location. He thereafter went there and took all of them captive and delivered them to Li Cunxu.

Li Cunxu initially took no actions against Liu Shouguang or Liu Rengong, settling them in at a mansion and gave them clothes, vessels, and food, even though he jokingly commented at Liu Shouguang, "How is it that the host fled so far when he heard that the guest had arrived?" Liu Rengong and his wife both spat on him and stated, "Rebellious bandit! Look at what you did to our household!"

In spring 914, Li Cunxu took the Liu household, including Liu Rengong and Liu Shouguang, on a victory tour through Yiwu and Chengde Circuits, at Wang Chuzhi's and Wang Rong's invitation. When they arrived at Chengde Circuit, at Wang Rong's request (as Wang Rong wanted to finally meet Liu Rengong in person), Li Cunxu temporarily removed the shackles from Liu Rengong and Liu Shouguang, and had them attend a feast that Wang Rong held for him. After they arrived back at Jin's capital Taiyuan, LI Cunxu prepared to execute Liu Shouguang and personally attended to the execution. Liu Shouguang begged for his life and pointed out that Li Xiaoxi had persuaded him not to surrender; when Li Xiaoxi then rebuked him, Li Cunxu, angry at Li Xiaoxi's attitude toward his old master, executed Li Xiaoxi first. Liu Shouguang continued to beg for his life, stating, "I am good at riding and archery; if Your Royal Highness wants to establish great accomplishments, why not spare me so that I can serve under you?" Empresses Li and Zhu rebuked him and accepted their fate, but Liu Shouguang begged for his life even up to the last moment. (After his death, his father Liu Rengong was taken to Li Keyong's tomb and executed there.)

== Personal information ==
- Father
  - Liu Rengong (executed by Li Cunxu 914)
- Wives
  - Empress Li (executed by Li Cunxu 914)
  - Empress Zhu (executed by Li Cunxu 914)
- Children
  - Liu Jiwei (劉繼威) (killed by Zhang Wanjin (張萬進) 912)
  - Liu Jixun (劉繼珣) (executed by Li Cunxu 914)
  - Liu Jifang (劉繼方) (executed by Li Cunxu 914)
  - Liu Jizuo (劉繼祚) (executed by Li Cunxu 914)

Besides above, Liu Jiyong (劉繼顒) was recorded as a son of Liu Shouguang, however other sources revealed that he was actually a son of Liu Shouqi.

== Notes and references ==
- History of the Five Dynasties, vol. 135.
- New History of the Five Dynasties, vol. 39.
- Zizhi Tongjian, vols. 264, 266, 267, 268, 269.

Chinese nobility
New title	Emperor of Yan; 911–914	Regime destroyed
Preceded by Zhu Wen	Ruler of China (Beijing/Tianjin region) (de jure); 911–914	Succeeded by Li Cunxu (Prince of Jin)
Preceded by Zhu Wen	Ruler of China (Cangzhou region) (de jure); 911–912	Succeeded by Zhu Zhen of Later Liang
Preceded by Liu Rengong	Ruler of China (Beijing/Tianjin region) (de facto); 907–914	Succeeded by Zhou Dewei
Preceded by Liu Yanzuo	Ruler of China (Cangzhou region) (de facto); 910–912	Succeeded by Zhang Wanjin (張萬進)
