= Wang Jingren =

Chinese general

Wang Jingren (王景仁), né Wang Maozhang (王茂章, name changed 906?), was a major general during the Chinese Five Dynasties and Ten Kingdoms period Later Liang state. He was originally a general under Yang Xingmi, the Prince of Wu in the late Tang dynasty, but later got into a dispute with Yang's son and successor Yang Wo and was forced to flee to the domain of Qian Liu, who, as a Later Liang vassal, later sent Wang to Later Liang, whose Emperor Taizu (Zhu Quanzhong) was impressed with Wang's abilities and therefore made Wang a major general. Wang, however, was not successful in subsequent campaigns against either Wu or Later Liang's northern enemy Jin.

== Service under Yang Xingmi ==
It is not known when Wang Maozhang was born, but it is known that he was from Hefei and that, in his youth, he followed Yang Xingmi in Yang's campaigns to take control of Huainan Circuit (淮南, headquartered in modern Yangzhou, Jiangsu). It was said that Wang was brave in battle but lacked an impressive presence on the battlefield. However, once in battle, he always fought alongside his soldiers and earned their respect, as well as Yang's.

=== Campaign aiding Wang Shifan ===
In 903, when Wang Shifan the military governor (jiedushi) of Pinglu Circuit (平盧, headquartered in modern Weifang, Shandong) was under attack by Yang's archenemy Zhu Quanzhong the military governor of Xuanwu Circuit (宣武, headquartered in modern Kaifeng, Henan), Wang Shifan sought aid from Yang. Yang sent Wang Maozhang, with 7,000 men, to aid Wang Shifan. Wang Maozhang first rendezvoused with Wang Shifan's brother Wang Shihui (王師誨) and captured Mi Prefecture. Meanwhile, the Xuanwu forces under Zhu's nephew Zhu Youning (朱友寧) was attacking Pinglu's capital Qing Prefecture (青州). In response, Wang Shifan had sent the soldiers from Deng (登州) and Lai (萊州) Prefectures (both in modern Yantai, Shandong) to set up two defensive encampments. Zhu Youning attacked the Deng camp bitterly, with Wang Maozhang standing by and not trying to relieve the Deng camp, so Zhu Youning captured it. He then attacked the Lai camp, but by that point, his soldiers, as Wang Maozhang anticipated, had been worn out. Wang Maozhang then counterattacked with Wang Shifan, and they defeated the Xuanwu troops, killing Zhu Youning and delivering his head to Huainan.

Hearing of Zhu Youning's death, Zhu Quanzhong himself headed to the Pinglu front, and, after he arrived about a month later, he initially defeated Wang Shifan's troops. When he then engaged Wang Maozhang, however, Wang Maozhang was able to battle him to a stalemate—while holding a feast in the middle of the battle, impressing Zhu with his fortitude. However, believing that he would be unable to defeat the Xuanwu troops with their numerical advantage, Wang Maozhang withdrew back to Huainan territory with relatively few casualties. (Zhu was subsequently able to force Wang Shifan to submit to him.)

=== Campaign against An Renyi and Tian Jun ===
Later in the year, Yang Xingmi's subordinates Tian Jun the military governor of Ningguo Circuit (寧國, headquartered in modern Xuancheng, Anhui) and An Renyi (安仁義) the military prefect of Run Prefecture (潤州, in modern Zhenjiang, Jiangsu) rebelled against him. Yang sent Wang Maozhang to attack An, but initially he could not achieve success against An in sieging Run Prefecture. Yang thus recalled him and sent him to aid Tai Meng (臺濛) in attacking Ningguo's capital Xuan Prefecture (宣州). After a battle in which Tai defeated Tian, who had advanced to engage him, and forced Tian to retreat back to Xuan Prefecture, though, Yang diverted Wang back to Run Prefecture against An.

The siege of Run was unable to succeed, however, for more than a year, as An was one of Huainan's most capable officers. Yang thus sought, in vain, to persuade An to submit to him again. By spring 905, however, Wang was able to penetrate Run's defenses by digging tunnels under the city walls. An personally took position up in a tower, and initially the Huainan troops were still hesitant to attack him there. As the officer Li Decheng continued to be polite to An during the siege, however, An surrendered to Li Decheng and was subsequently executed.

== Flight to Qian Liu ==
Later in 905, Yang Xingmi fell deathly ill. He recalled his oldest son Yang Wo, who was then serving as the governor (觀察使, Guanchashi) of Xuan Prefecture, from Xuan, intending to pass his authorities to Yang Wo. He sent Wang Maozhang to Xuan to serve as governor, succeeding Yang Wo. As Yang Wo was set to depart Xuan Prefecture, he wanted to take the tents and the headquarters guards with him, but Wang refused to let him do so, drawing his ire. After Yang Xingmi died later in the year and was succeeded by Yang Wo, Yang Wo thus sent Li Jian (李簡) to attack Wang. When Li's forces reached Xuan in spring 906, Wang, judging himself to be unable to withstand an attack, fled with the soldiers directly under him to the territory of Qian Liu the military governor of Zhenhai (鎮海, headquartered in modern Hangzhou, Zhejiang) and Zhendong (鎮東, headquartered in modern Shaoxing, Zhejiang) Circuits. Qian made Wang his deputy military governor for Zhendong. He later gave Wang the title of military governor of Ningguo—even though Ningguo remained under Yang Wo's control.

== As Later Liang general ==
=== During Emperor Taizu's reign ===
As Zhu Quanzhong—who had forced Tang dynasty's final emperor Emperor Ai to yield the throne to him, ending Tang and establishing a new Later Liang as its Emperor Taizu—was impressed with Wang Maozhang, he wanted to summon Wang to him. Qian Liu, who was a vassal of Later Liang and whom Emperor Taizu the Prince of Wuyue, also wanted Wang to persuade Emperor Taizu to attack Hongnong (i.e., formerly Huainan, now ruled by Yang Wo's brother and successor Yang Longyan). In 908, Qian thus sent Wang—whose name had been changed to Wang Jingren by this point to observe naming taboo since Emperor Taizu's great-grandfather was named Zhu Maolin (朱茂琳)—to Later Liang's capital Luoyang to submit strategies on how to conquer Hongnong. Emperor Taizu let Wang retain his title of military governor of Ningguo and further bestowed the chancellor title Tong Zhongshu Menxia Pingzhangshi (同中書門下平章事) on him—apparently initially honorary, but eventually having him join the chancellors in policy discussions.

In 910, Emperor Taizu commissioned Wang the commander of the Later Liang armies to the north, posturing to attack Later Liang's enemy to the north, Jin. What Emperor Taizu secretly intended, however, was for Wang to prepare to attack Wang Rong the military governor of Wushun Circuit (武順, headquartered in modern Shijiazhuang, Hebei) (whose territory was also known as Zhao) and Wang Chuzhi the military governor of Yiwu Circuit (義武, headquartered in modern Baoding, Hebei)—who were formally Later Liang vassals but whose loyalty Emperor Taizu suspected of wavering. The generals Han Qing (韓勍) and Li Si'an (李思安) served as Wang's deputy commander and forward commander, respectively, and Wang initially took up position at Wei Prefecture (魏州, in modern Handan, Hebei). Later in the year, after the Later Liang officers Du Tingyin (杜廷隱) and Ding Yanhui (丁延徽) took over Zhao's Shen (深州) and Ji (冀州) Prefectures (both in modern Hengshui, Hebei) by trick, Wang was set to attack Zhao and conquer it—but Emperor Taizu, believing the warnings by his astrologers that launching an army at that time would bring disaster, recalled Wang to Luoyang, allowing Zhao time to ally itself with Jin and Yiwu and receive aid troops from Jin's prince Li Cunxu. Only after receiving news of a formal Zhao/Jin alliance did Emperor Taizu order Wang to advance north to attack Zhao. Wang thus advanced to Boxiang (柏鄉, in modern Xingtai, Hebei).

With the Later Liang forces under Wang and the Jin/Zhao forces under Li Cunxu initially separated only by a river, and with the Later Liang forces both having numerical and geographic advantage (as, at that time, as Li Cunxu's general Zhou Dewei pointed out, the Jin advantage in cavalry mobility was completely negated by the terrain), Wang was quickly building temporary bridges to try to cross the river quickly to attack the Jin/Zhao army, but Li Cunxu, realizing this, withdrew to Gaoyi (高邑, in modern Shijiazhuang), while sending cavalry raiders to cut off the Later Liang army's supply route and prevent them from cutting grass to feed their horses, causing many deaths to Later Liang's horses. In spring 911, after more than a month of stalemate, Li Cunxu sent Zhou to provoke Wang and Han into engaging his troops and crossing the river. They fought for a morning, and the Later Liang army began to tire. Wang's own troops withdrew slightly, when Zhou declared to the other Later Liang troops that Wang was fleeing since he had been defeated—causing a general panic in the Later Liang army and its collapse. Wang, Han, and Li Si'an were able to flee with small groups of soldiers protecting them, but most of the Later Liang army was slaughtered by the Jin/Zhao troops.

In the aftermaths of the defeat, Emperor Taizu removed from Wang the titles of commander of the armies to the north and Tong Zhongshu Menxia Pingzhangshi, and put him under house arrest. However, when he later met with Wang, he stated to Wang that he knew that Wang's command was hindered by the fact that he was a foreigner to the Later Liang troops and that Han and Li Si'an were not fully following his orders; several months later, he restored Wang's offices.

=== During Zhu Zhen's reign ===
In 913—by which time Emperor Taizu's son Zhu Zhen was Later Liang's emperor—Zhu Zhen sent Wang Jingren to attack Wu (i.e., Hongnong, with Yang Longyan carrying the title of Prince of Wu by this point); Wang headed for Wu's Lu (廬州, in modern Hefei) and Shou (壽州, in modern Lu'an, Anhui) Prefectures. The Wu generals Xu Wen and Zhu Jin led troops to resist Wang. Wang initially had success against Xu, nearly trapping and killing him at Zhaobu (趙步, in modern Lu'an), but Xu was able to escape. The Wu troops then regrouped and engaged Wang's troops at Huoqiu (霍丘, in modern Lu'an). Wang withdrew, and with him personally guarding the rear during the withdrawal, the Wu troops were not daring to chase after him, so initially the losses were minimal. However, trouble came when the Later Liang army was crossing the Huai River. When Wang advanced south, he had initially marked the low-water spots of the river with wooden markers to allow the army to cross the river safely. By the time that he was withdrawing, the Wu defender of Huoqiu, Zhu Jing (朱景), had moved the markers to deep water spots, such that when the Later Liang army was withdrawing, they were crossing at the wrong spots, and many of them drowned. After Wang returned to Daliang (which Zhu Zhen had made his capital), he died due to illness. He was given posthumous honors.
