= Yan (Five Dynasties period) =

Short-lived 10th-century Chinese state

Yan 燕
- 911–914
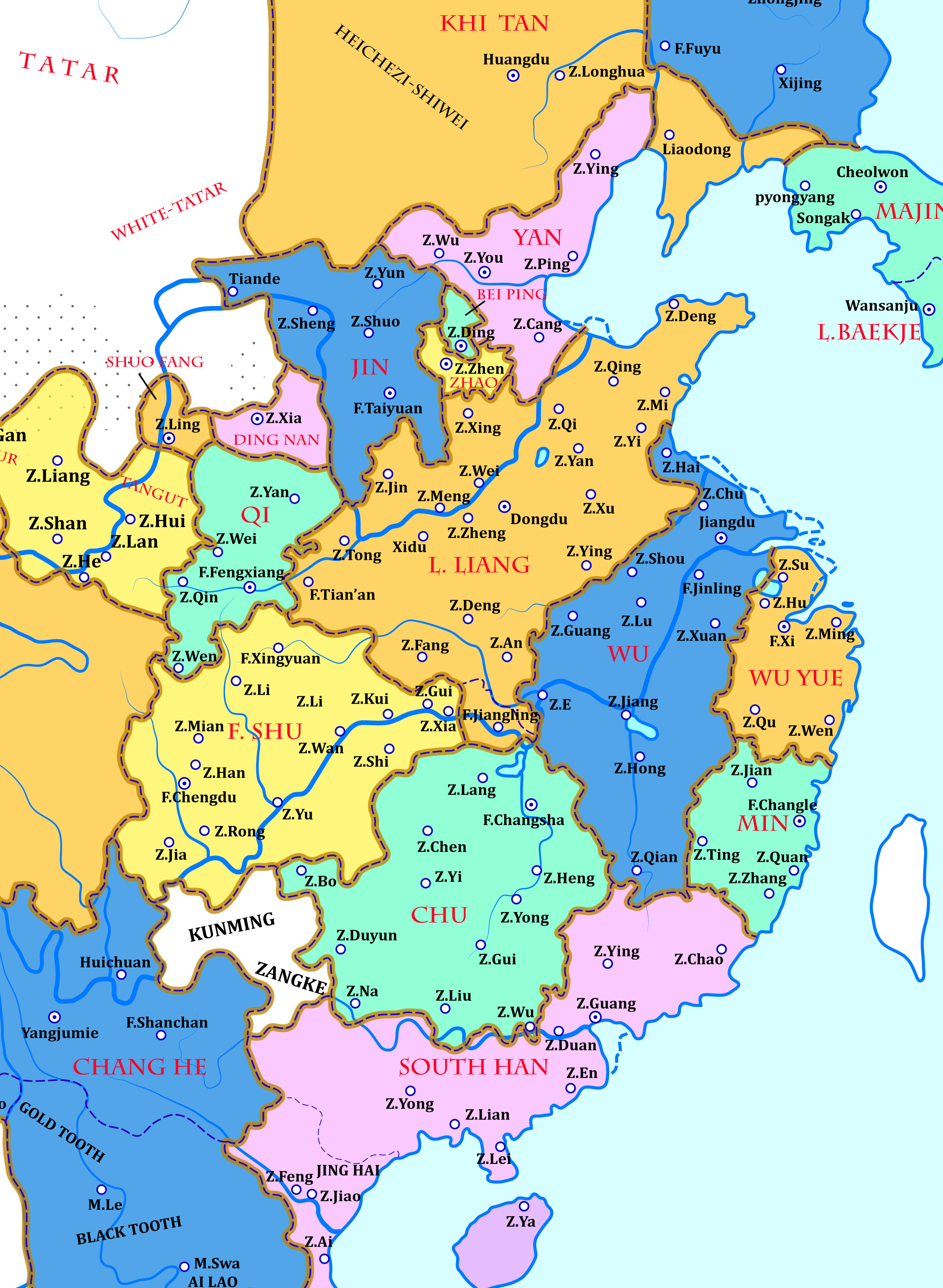
- Capital: You Prefecture
- Government: Empire
- Emperor
  - 911–914: Liu Shouguang
- Historical era: Five Dynasties and Ten Kingdoms Period
  - Established: 911
  - Disestablished: 914
  - Liu Shouguang's death: 914
Preceded by	Succeeded by
Lulong Jiedushi	Jin (Later Tang precursor)
- Today part of: China

Yan (Chinese: 燕), sometimes known in historiography as Jie Yan (桀燕), was a short-lived monarchical state in the vicinity of present-day Beijing at the beginning of the Five Dynasties and Ten Kingdoms period. Yan, established by Liu Shouguang in 911, only lasted for two years before its destruction by Li Cunxu of the Former Jin dynasty.

As the only ruler of Yan, Liu Shouguang was noted for his cruelty. The state of Yan was therefore sometimes referred to as Jie Yan, in reference to the tyrannical ruler Jie of the Xia dynasty.
