= Ma Shaohong =

Chinese general

Ma Shaohong (Chinese: 馬紹宏) (died May 18, 932), known during the reign of Emperor Zhuangzong of Later Tang (Li Cunxu) as Li Shaohong (李紹宏), was a powerful eunuch official/general during the early Chinese Five Dynasties and Ten Kingdoms period, who served Emperor Zhuangzong during his reign as emperor and, previously to that, as the Prince of Jin (Later Tang's predecessor state).

== During Jin ==
Traditional histories — including the official history Old History of the Five Dynasties and the chronicle Zizhi Tongjian — did not give details on Ma Shaohong's family origins, or how he became a eunuch serving under Li Cunxu, other than giving his original family name of Ma. (The other official history of the period, the New History of the Five Dynasties, did not have a biography for him at all, making only a brief condemning reference to him at the end of the biography of his colleague Zhang Juhan.) At some point during his service of Li Cunxu, he was bestowed the Tang dynasty imperial surname of Li (which Li Cunxu's grandfather Li Guochang had also been given), and thus became known as Li Shaohong.

The first historical reference to Ma was in 919, when he was then serving, alongside the officer Meng Zhixiang (the husband of Li Cunxu's elder sister), as a chief of staff (中門使, Zhongmenshi) for Li Cunxu, who was then the Prince of Jin, in Li Cunxu's capacity as the military governor (Jiedushi) of Hedong (河東, headquartered in modern Taiyuan, Shanxi) and Tianxiong (天雄, headquartered in modern Handan, Hebei) Circuits. In 918, Li Cunxu's highly regarded general Zhou Dewei the military governor of Lulong Circuit (盧龍, headquartered in modern Beijing) had been killed in battle on Li Cunxu's campaign against Jin's archrival Later Liang. In 919, Li Cunxu briefly replaced Zhou with his cousin Li Sizhao, but soon thereafter, apparently believing that it was ill-advised to send Li Sizhao far away from his own Zhaoyi Circuit (昭義, headquartered in modern Changzhi, Shanxi), Li Cunxu personally assumed the command of Lulong, but sent Li Shaohong to Lulong to oversee the circuit in Li Sizhao's place. (Shortly after Li Shaohong's departure for Lulong, Meng resigned from the position of chief of staff, leaving Li Shaohong's and Meng's deputy Guo Chongtao as the new chief of staff.) In 921, when Khitan Empire's Emperor Taizu invaded Jin to assist the Chengde Circuit (成德, headquartered in modern Shijiazhuang, Hebei) rebels led by Zhang Chujin, it was Li Shaohong who defended Lulong's capital You Prefecture (幽州) against the Khitan attack.

== During Later Tang ==
=== During Emperor Zhuangzong's reign ===
In 923, Li Cunxu declared himself the emperor of a new Later Tang (as Emperor Zhuangzong). Shortly after, he summoned Li Shaohong back from Lulong, apparently considering making him one of the two chiefs of staff (now renamed Shumishi. However, the ambitious Guo Chongtao did not want to again effectively serve under Li Shaohong (who was more senior), and therefore instead recommended a senior holdover eunuch from Tang dynasty times, Zhang Juhan, to serve as chief of staff with himself. Instead, Li Shaohong was made the director of palace affairs (宣徽使, Xuanhuishi). He thereafter resented Guo.

At that time, Later Tang was at a crucial juncture in Emperor Zhuangzong's long-term war against Later Liang — while Emperor Zhuangzong's adoptive brother Li Siyuan had recently launched a successful surprise attack against Later Liang's Tianping Circuit (天平, headquartered in modern Tai'an, Shandong), capturing it, the two states were largely stalemated on the Yellow River boundary. (Tianping was south of the Yellow River, but Later Liang had recently captured Later Tang's key garrisons Wei Prefecture (衛州, in modern Puyang, Henan) and Liyang (黎陽, in modern Hebi, Henan), north of the Yellow River, and Li Sizhao's son and successor Li Jitao had rebelled against Emperor Zhuangzong and submitted to Later Liang recently.) At that time, the Later Tang army's military supplies were low, and there were rumors of an impending major Khitan attack to the north. Li Shaohong advocated negotiating a peace accord with Later Liang — exchanging Tianping for Wei Prefecture and Liyang, with the two states formally setting their boundary at the Yellow River. Guo opposed, however, believing that this was the time to use Tianping as a launchpad to destroy Later Liang. Emperor Zhuangzong agreed with Guo, and shortly after launched a surprise attack from Tianping against the Later Liang capital Daliang. Daliang was caught defenseless, and the Later Liang emperor Zhu Zhen committed suicide, ending Later Liang. Emperor Zhuangzong, while praising Guo and Li Siyuan for their contributions in this victory, did not demote or punish Li Shaohong.

In 924, when Khitan did attack You Prefecture again, Emperor Zhuangzong, who had by that point established Luoyang as his capital, sent Li Siyuan north to defend against the Khitan attack, with Huo Yanwei serving as Li Siyuan's deputy and Li Shaohong as the monitor of the army. Shortly after, the Khitan army withdrew.

Shortly after, Guo, knowing that Li Shaohong resented him, tried to placate Li Shaohong by establishing the post of monitor of finances (內勾使, Neigoushi) for Li Shaohong, to oversee the three financial agencies (which were responsible for taxation, treasury, and salt and iron monopolies). The move, however, did not appease Li Shaohong, and instead only created an additional layer of oversight for financial matters, which created more paperwork for the local governments. At that time, Guo himself was drawing resentment from many others due to his control on both military and political matters, and therefore tried to resign the chief of staff post and have it transferred to Li Shaohong, but Emperor Zhuangzong did not approve Guo's resignation.

In 925, Emperor Zhuangzong wanted to launch a major attack to destroy Later Tang's southwestern neighbor Former Shu. He first requested Li Shaohong's opinion on the right commander for the army, and Li Shaohong recommended the former Later Liang general Li Shaoqin, who had flattered Li Shaohong. However, Guo opposed on the grounds that Li Shaoqin was wicked and had contributed to Later Liang's destruction, and also opposed Li Siyuan (on the grounds that Li Siyuan would be necessary to be available for defending against another potential Khitan incursion). Instead, Guo recommended putting Emperor Zhuangzong's oldest son Li Jiji in command. Emperor Zhuangzong agreed, and also made Guo Li Jiji's deputy, in actual command of the army.

After Li Jiji and Guo conquered Former Shu shortly after, however, Emperor Zhuangzong's wife (Li Jiji's mother) Empress Liu came to suspect that Guo was planning to rebel and take the Former Shu territory for himself; she therefore ordered Li Jiji to put Guo to death, and Li Jiji did in spring 926. Shortly after Guo's death, Emperor Zhuangzong also executed another major general, Li Jilin, and the deaths of Guo and Li Jilin caused many mutinies throughout the realm, with many generals suspected of being complicit in those mutinies. Li Siyuan was frequently rumored to be involved, but Li Shaohong, who was friendly with him, protected him, so Emperor Zhuangzong took no actions against him. Meanwhile, after Guo's death, Li Shaohong became chief of staff.

Soon, a mutiny at the major city of Yedu (鄴都, i.e., Tianxiong's capital) was causing Emperor Zhuangzong much concern. Li Shaohong again recommended Li Shaoqin to command the army against the Yedu mutiny, and Emperor Zhuangzong initially agreed. However, after Li Shaoqin selected many officers from the former Later Liang army ranks, Emperor Zhuangzong came to suspect him, and cancelled his commission. With many officials recommending Li Siyuan, including Li Shaohong and the senior official Zhang Quanyi, Emperor Zhuangzong instead sent Li Siyuan. When Li Siyuan got to Yedu, however, his own troops mutinied and forced him to join forces with the Yedu rebels. With his communication lines with Emperor Zhuangzong cut off, Li Siyuan decided to embrace the mutiny, and he advanced south toward Luoyang. Emperor Zhuangzong prepared to launch his own army from Luoyang to combat Li Siyuan, but as he was prepared to depart Luoyang, he was killed in a mutiny at Luoyang itself.

=== After Emperor Zhuangzong's death ===
When Li Siyuan subsequently arrived at Luoyang, many senior officials, including Li Shaohong, Zhang Juhan, the chancellor Doulu Ge and Wei Yue, and the generals Zhu Shouyin, Fu Xi (符習), Huo (who was using the name Li Shaozhen at this point), Li Shaoqian, and Li Shaoying (李紹英), all tried to persuade Li Siyuan to take the throne. Li Siyuan initially declined, but eventually agreed, taking the throne as Emperor Mingzong. After Emperor Mingzong took the throne, Li Shaohong requested that his former surname of Ma be restored. He died in 932.

== Notes and references ==
- Old History of the Five Dynasties, vol. 72.
- Zizhi Tongjian, vols. 270, 271, 272, 273, 274, 275.
