= Kang Yanxiao =

- Native name: 康延孝
- Born: Unknown; China
- Died: 926 China
- Allegiance: Later Tang
- Branch: Later Tang military
- Rank: General
- Commands: Later Tang forces in Sichuan
- Conflicts: Conquest of Former Shu

Kang Yanxiao (Chinese: 康延孝) (died 926), known as Li Shaochen (李紹琛) from 923 to 926, was a Chinese military general of the Chinese Five Dynasties and Ten Kingdoms period states Later Liang and Later Tang. It was his defection from Later Liang to Later Tang in 923 and subsequent offering of intelligence to Later Tang's emperor Li Cunxu that persuaded Li Cunxu to launch a surprise attack on the Later Liang capital Daliang that resulted in the fall of Later Liang, for which Kang was rewarded and given the imperially-bestowed name of Li Shaochen. He subsequently had major contributions in Later Tang's conquest of Former Shu as well. After Former Shu's fall, however, with Li Cunxu killing the major generals Guo Chongtao and Li Jilin (Zhu Youqian), Li Shaochen became apprehensive and decided to rebel, but was subsequently defeated and executed.

== Background and defection to Later Liang ==
Kang Yangxiao was said to be a tribesman from the Daibei region (代北, i.e., the region north of modern Xinzhou, Shanxi), who served as a soldier at Hedong Circuit (河東, headquartered in modern Taiyuan, Shanxi). At one point, he was guilty of a crime, and he fled to Xuanwu Circuit (宣武, headquartered in modern Kaifeng, Henan). (While the accounts do not give a date for his defection, the fact that the History of the Five Dynasties referred to Xuanwu as "Bian Liang" (汴梁) by its prefectural and regional designations, suggests that this occurred in the very late Tang dynasty, when Hedong and Xuanwu were respectively ruled by powerful rival warlords Li Keyong and Zhu Quanzhong.) After Zhu Quanzhong seized the throne and established Later Liang as its founding emperor, Kang was gradually promoted in the soldier ranks. He had further military accomplishments during the reign of Zhu Quanzhong's son and successor Zhu Zhen.

== Redefection to Later Tang ==
In 923, Zhu Zhen commissioned his general Duan Ning to prepare to launch a major attack on Later Liang's archrival Later Tang—i.e., the successor state of what was the power bloc centered around Hedong, by this point ruled by Li Keyong's son Li Cunxu, who had just recently declared himself emperor. Kang Yanxiao was assigned as an army commander under Duan. Kang believed that Zhu was then overly trusting of his corrupt inner circle of officials, which would soon lead to destruction, and therefore secretly send letters to Li Cunxu's major general and adoptive brother Li Siyuan, offering to defect. In fall 923, he carried out his offer, taking some 100 of his cavalry soldiers and surrendered to Later Tang, rendezvousing with the Later Tang emperor at Chaocheng (朝城, in modern Liaocheng, Shandong). Li Cunxu took off his own silk robe and jade belt and awarded them to Kang, making him a commander in his own army against Later Liang, as well as the prefect of Bo Prefecture (博州, in modern Liaocheng).

Kang revealed that the Later Liang government was then highly influenced by Zhu's close associates, his brother-in-law Zhao Yan and four relatives of Zhu's deceased wife Consort Zhang. He further revealed to Li Cunxu that Duan had an ambitious four-prong plan to attack Later Tang, to be launched in winter 923, to try to reverse years of Later Liang losses at the hands of Later Tang's predecessor state Jin:

1. Dong Zhang would head toward Taiyuan.
2. Huo Yanwei would head toward Zhen Prefecture (鎮州, in modern Baoding, Hebei).
3. Wang Yanzhang and Zhang Hanjie (張漢傑, Consort Zhang's brother) would head toward Yun Prefecture (鄆州, in modern Tai'an, Shandong, which Li Siyuan had captured earlier in the year).
4. Duan himself, along with Du Yanqiu, would confront Li Cunxu himself.

Kang pointed out the weakness of the plan—that it divided up the Later Liang troops, making, in particular, Wang's and Zhang's army vulnerable. He advocated that, as Later Liang would be about to implement this plan, for Li Cunxu to rendezvous with Li Siyuan at Yun, and then head directly toward Later Liang's defenseless capital Daliang. With the concurrence of his chief of staff Guo Chongtao, Li Cunxu agreed.

In winter 923, as Later Liang began to launch its attacks, Li Cunxu moved across the Yellow River and joined Li Siyuan at Yun. They then confronted Wang and Zhang at Zhongdu (中都, in modern Jining, Shandong), defeating and capturing them. Li Cunxu initially hesitated at heading toward Daliang directly, with most of his generals advocating by this point that he first capture Later Liang's coastal circuits. However, Kang insisted on the original plan of attacking Daliang, and with Li Siyuan concurring with him, Li Cunxu agreed, and headed toward Daliang. This caught Zhu by surprise, as Duan's four-prong attack plan left Daliang defenseless. As Later Tang forces approached, he, seeing the situation as hopeless, committed suicide, ending Later Liang. All of Later Liang territory surrendered to Later Tang, allowing Later Tang to absorb it. To reward Kang, Li Cunxu made him the defender of Zheng Prefecture (鄭州, in modern Zhengzhou, Henan), and bestowed on him both the imperial surname Li and a new personal name of Shaochen. In 924, Li Cunxu made him the military governor of Baoyi Circuit (保義, headquartered in modern Sanmenxia, Henan).

== Participation in the Former Shu campaign ==
In fall 925, Li Cunxu launched a major campaign against Later Tang's southwestern neighbor Former Shu, with his son Li Jiji the Prince of Wei in titular command, but with Guo Chongtao in actual command. Li Shaochen served as Guo's forward commander, commanding 3,000 cavalry and 10,000 infantry soldiers, joined by Li Yan (李嚴).

Li Shaochen quickly attacked the Former Shu city of Weiwu (威武, in modern Baoji, Shaanxi) and forcing its surrender; he then advanced and captured Feng (鳳州, in modern Baoji) and Xing (興州, in modern Hanzhong, Shaanxi). When a major Former Shu counterattack force, under the commands of the generals Wang Zongxun (王宗勳), Wang Zongyan (王宗儼), and Wang Zongyu (王宗昱), engaged him, he crushed them, forcing them to flee. He then headed directly for the major Former Shu city of Li Prefecture (利州, in modern Guangyuan, Sichuan); the Former Shu major general Wang Zongbi abandoned the city and fled. He advanced further to Mian Prefecture (綿州, in modern Mianyang, Sichuan), and encountered an obstacle there—that, while Former Shu forces had abandoned the city, they destroyed all the food supplies there, as well as the bridge over the Mian River (綿江), which Mian Prefecture sat on. He chose to take only his cavalry soldiers, fording on their horses, across the river, at the great loss of life from drowning, believing that he needed to quickly advance toward the Former Shu capital Chengdu in order to give the Former Shu emperor Wang Zongyan no chance to rest and think. He then captured Han Prefecture (漢州, in modern Deyang, Sichuan).

By this point, Wang Zongbi had become intent on surrendering to Later Tang, to save himself. He forcibly seized Wang Yan and the rest of the imperial household at Chengdu, and then made an overture to surrender on Wang Yan's behalf, addressed to Li Yan. Li Yan went to Chengdu, ascertained that in fact a surrender was forthcoming, and advised Guo and Li Jiji of the same. Li Shaochen thus stopped at Han to wait for Li Jiji and Guo. Wang Zongbi also arrived there to express his intent to surrender. They then headed toward Chengdu together, where Wang Yan formally surrendered, ending Former Shu. Later Tang took control of its territory.

== Rebellion and death ==
Guo Chongtao, however, was closer to Dong Zhang, who also served in the campaign, than he was to Li Shaochen, and, despite Li Shaochen's great accomplishments in the campaign and higher rank than Dong, he consulted Dong on more decisions on the subsequent pacification of the Former Shu territory. Li Shaochen, in displeasure, publicly rebuked Dong several times and at one point threatened to find a reason to put Dong to death under military law. When Dong informed Guo this, Guo decided to exercise imperial authority Li Cunxu delegated to him and commission Dong as the military governor of Dongchuan Circuit (東川, headquartered in modern Mianyang) and relieve Dong's military responsibilities (so that Li Shaochen would not have any excuse to use military law against Dong). Further angered (believing that his military accomplishments entitled him to Dongchuan), Li Shaochen went to see Guo, ostensibly to recommend Ren Huan instead. Guo, instead, angrily responded, "Are you, Li Shaochen, rebelling? How dare you resist my decision?" Li Shaochen, in fear, withdrew from his presence.

However, shortly after, Guo himself fell under deep suspicion by Li Cunxu and his wife Empress Liu (that he would rebel and take over the Former Shu lands), and even though Li Cunxu was hesitant to act against Guo without proof, Empress Liu herself issued an order to Li Jiji that he put Guo to death. Li Jiji did so, and subsequently, Li Cunxu also put Guo's allies, the major general Li Jilin (previously named Zhu Youqian) and Li Cunxu's own brother Li Cun'ai (李存乂) the Prince of Mu, to death. The deaths of Guo and Li Jilin caused the army morale to plummet, and Li Shaochen himself, while not close to Guo, was shocked. He was further shocked when, as part of the order to slaughter Li Jilin's family, Li Cunxu ordered Dong, not Li Shaochen, to kill Li Jilin's son Zhu Lingde (朱令德) the military governor of Wuxin Circuit (武信, headquartered in modern Suining, Sichuan). Further, many of Li Shaochen's subordinates were old subordinates of Li Jilin's, and they mourned his death and feared their own deaths (as a number of their colleagues still serving under Li Jilin were killed as well when Li Jilin was killed). They thus urged Li Shaochen to take action. Li Shaochen, who was then serving as the rearguard for Li Jiji on his journey back to the Later Tang capital Luoyang, thus decided to rebel. When he reached Jian Prefecture (劍州, in modern Guangyuan, Sichuan), he declared himself the military governor of Xichuan Circuit (西川, headquartered at Chengdu), claiming to be displacing Meng Zhixiang, whom Li Cunxu had commissioned and who was already at Chengdu by that point. He was quickly able to get some 50,000 people of Shu to join him.

Hearing of Li Shaochen's betrayal, Li Jiji stopped at Li Prefecture (利州, in modern Guangyuan) and ordered Ren to attack Li Shaochen. Meng also sent his officers Li Renhan and Li Yanhou (李延厚) against Li Shaochen. Li Shaochen looked at these forces lightly, particularly not taking Ren seriously in that Ren was a civilian official. However, Ren defeated him, forcing him into retreating to Han Prefecture and trying to defend it. Han, however, did not have heavy fortifications and was only protected by wooden fences, which Ren was then able to burn. Li Shaochen engaged him again and was again defeated. Li Shaochen fled, but was captured at Mianzhu (綿竹, in modern Deyang). He was delivered to Han, where Meng went to meet Dong and Ren and held a feast. He had Li Shaochen brought to the feast table in his jail wagon (i.e., a mobile jail cell mounted on the wagon), stating to Li Shaochen, "You, Lord, already held the staff and flag of a military governor, and also had great accomplishment in conquering Shu. Why do you fear that you were not going to be honored, and instead got yourself into this jail wagon?" Li Shaochen responded, "Chancellor Guo had the highest accomplishments, including conquering the two Chuans [(i.e., Dongchuan and Xichuan)] without dirtying his sword. But even he was killed even though he was sinless. How can someone like I, Li Shaochen, be assured that I would still have my head? That was why I did not dare to return to the imperial government." Li Shaochen was subsequently delivered to Li Jiji, who continued his march back toward Luoyang. While Li Cunxu was himself shortly after killed in a mutiny at Luoyang, prior to his death, he dispatched the eunuch Xiang Yansi (向延嗣) to Li Jiji, ordering Li Shaochen's death, which was then carried out at Fengxiang (鳳翔, in modern Baoji).

== Notes and references ==
- History of the Five Dynasties, vol. 74.
- New History of the Five Dynasties, vol. 44.
- Zizhi Tongjian, vols. 272, 273, 274, 275.
