= Later Liang–Jin War =

War in China (884CE - 923CE)

- Part of Five Dynasties and Ten Kingdoms period
Date	884–November 923
Location	North & Central China (mainly modern Henan, Shanxi, and Hebei)
Result	Later Tang conquered Later Liang in November 923
Territorial changes	Later Tang reunited northern and central China

Belligerents
Former Jin (Later Tang after May 923)	Later Liang

Commanders and leaders
Li Keyong; Li Cunxu; Zhou Dewei; Li Siyuan; Li Cunshen; Li Cunjin; Li Sizhao; Li Cunzhang	Zhu Wen (Zhu Quanzhong); Zhu Youzhen; Wang Yanzhang; Yang Shihou; Ge Congzhou; Dai Siyuan (surrendered); Duan Ning (surrendered)

The Later Liang–Jin War, or simply the Liang–Jin War (Chinese: 梁晋争霸), was a prolonged war fought in northern and central China between 884 and 923 during the late Tang dynasty and the early Five Dynasties period. The initial belligerents were the warlords Li Keyong and Zhu Wen (then known as Zhu Quanzhong), who went on to found the Former Jin dynasty and Later Liang dynasty respectively.

After their deaths, their sons Li Cunxu and Zhu Youzhen continued the hostility, which also involved other quick-to-change-allegiance warlords mainly in modern Hebei. The war ended with the conquest of Zhu Youzhen's Later Liang dynasty by Li Cunxu's Later Tang dynasty in 923, after four decades of bloodshed that left much of the fertile Central Plain region destitute.
