= Duan Ning =

Chinese general

Duan Ning (Chinese: 段凝) (died November 8, 928?), né Duan Mingyuan (段明遠), known as Li Shaoqin (李紹欽) during the reign of Emperor Zhuangzong of Later Tang (Li Cunxu), was a general of the Chinese Five Dynasties and Ten Kingdoms period Later Liang and Later Tang states. He became an official under Later Liang's founder Zhu Wen (Zhu Quanzhong) based on his sister's being a concubine to Emperor Taizu, and later became a major general during the reign of Later Liang's last emperor Zhu Zhen. The failure in his ambitious plan to counterattack against Later Liang's northern rival Later Tang enabled Later Tang to defeat and conquer Later Liang, but despite such failure, he became a trusted general under Later Tang's founder Emperor Zhuangzong as well. After Emperor Zhuangzong's own fall and death, and succession by his adoptive brother Emperor Mingzong of Later Tang (Li Siyuan), Emperor Mingzong exiled Duan and later forced him to commit suicide.

== Background ==
It is not known when Duan Mingyuan was born, but it is known that his family was from Kaifeng. It was said that he was intelligent and capable of strategies when he was young. At some point, he became a chief secretary at the county government of Mianchi (澠池, in modern Sanmenxia, Henan), but abandoned his post to serve Zhu Quanzhong, then a powerful warlord and military governor of Xuanwu Circuit (宣武, headquartered in modern Kaifeng) — notwithstanding the fact that his father had previously served Zhu but had been exiled after being accused of faults.

== Service during Later Liang ==
=== Under Emperor Taizu ===
Because Duan Mingyuan was intelligent and because his younger sister was a concubine of Zhu Quanzhong's, after Zhu Quanzhong established Later Liang (as its Emperor Taizu), he began to value Duan's advice more. In 909, when he was serving as one of Zhu's attendants, he was made a general of the imperial guards and one of the monitors of the army against Later Liang's archenemy to the north, Jin. In 910, he was made the prefect of Huai Prefecture (懷州, in modern Jiaozuo, Henan).

In late 911, as Emperor Taizu was returning from a campaign against Jin, he made a stop at Huojia (獲嘉, in modern Xinxiang, Henan), within Huai Prefecture. Duan supplied him with many delicacies, pleasing him. In spring 912, when Emperor Taizu was departing for another campaign against Jin and its ally Zhao, he made a stop at Huojia again, and Duan made even more elaborate offerings. After Duan's display, Emperor Taizu remembered how another general, Li Si'an (李思安), had failed to do so earlier in 911, and in anger, had Li exiled and later forced Li to commit suicide, while he issued an edict praising Duan for his diligence. After this incident, Duan was made the prefect of the more prosperous Zheng Prefecture (鄭州, in modern Zhengzhou, Henan) and made the chief monitor of the army against Jin. Emperor Taizu's chief advisor Li Zhen, however, did not consider Duan an appropriate person for that role and sought to have him removed. Emperor Taizu, however, resisted the suggestion. At some point, he changed his name from Mingyuan to Ning.

=== Under Zhu Zhen ===
Duan Ning was not again mentioned in traditional histories until 920, by which time Emperor Taizu had died and his son Zhu Zhen was emperor. That year, after the Later Liang military governor (Jiedushi) Zhu Youqian surrendered his Huguo Circuit (護國, headquartered in modern Yuncheng, Shanxi) to Jin, Zhu Zhen sent the major general Liu Xun to attack Zhu Youqian, assisted by Yin Hao (尹浩), Wen Zhaotu (溫昭圖), and Duan, who was then serving as the director of the imperial gardens (莊宅使, Zhuangzhaishi). As Liu and Zhu Youqian were related by marriage, Liu sent letters trying to persuade Zhu Youqian to return to the Later Liang cause, but after failing to do so, attacked Zhu Youqian but was then defeated by the Jin relief forces. After the defeat, Yin and Duan sent a joint report to Zhu Zhen, accusing Liu of slowing the progress of the army to allow Jin forces to save Zhu Youqian. Zhu Zhen believed them and poisoned Liu to death.

Over the years, Later Liang had lost its territory, bit by bit, north of the Yellow River to Jin, causing the morale of the Later Liang army to be low. In 922, however, Duan was involved in a counterattack that, to a degree, restored the Later Liang morale. At that time, the main Jin army was attacking Zhang Chujin, whose father Zhang Wenli had assassinated Wang Rong the Prince of Zhao and taken over Zhao lands, before dying and leaving the lands in Zhang Chujin's hands. With the main Jin army in the north, the defense of the key border city Wei Prefecture (衛州, in modern Xinxiang, Henan) was left in the hands of its prefect Li Cunru (李存儒), an adoptive brother of Jin's prince Li Cunxu. Li Cunru, however, was incompetent, allowing soldiers to bribe themselves out of active duty. In fall 922, Duan, along with another officer, Zhang Lang (張朗), launched a surprise attack on Wei Prefecture, capturing it and taking Li Cunru captive. Duan subsequently rendezvoused with the supreme commander of the Later Liang forces against Jin, Dai Siyuan, and captured a number of other nearby Jin garrisons — Qimen (淇門, in modern Hebi, Henan), Gongcheng (共城), and Xinxiang (新鄉, both in modern Xinxiang). Jin suffered losses of a third of its food storage on the Jin/Later Liang border, and this greatly encouraged the Later Liang army.

In 923, shortly after Li Cunxu declared himself emperor of a new Later Tang (as its Emperor Zhuangzong), he sent his adoptive brother Li Siyuan to launch a surprise attack on a major Later Liang city south of the Yellow River, Yun Prefecture (鄆州, in modern Tai'an, Shandong) and captured it. This left the Later Liang capital Daliang (i.e., Kaifeng) relatively defenseless, and Zhu Zhen, in fear and anger, removed Dai (as he believed Dai to be responsible for leaving Yun Prefecture open to attack) and replaced him with Wang Yanzhang, with Duan serving as Wang's deputy.

A quick counterattack by Wang captured the southern half of Desheng (德勝, in modern Puyang, Henan) (i.e., the southern part of the city south of the Yellow River), and Wang subsequently put Yangliu (楊劉, in modern Liaocheng, Shandong) under siege, to try to cut off the communications between Later Tang proper and Yun Prefecture. However, Zhu Zhen's close associates Zhao Yan (Zhu Zhen's brother-in-law) and four brothers/cousins of his deceased wife Consort Zhang were fearful that Wang was resentful of their influence on the governance — as Wang often spoke of wanting to kill the evildoers after he achieves victories on the battlefield, which they believed to be targeting them. On the other hand, Duan ingratiated them. Therefore, when news of the Desheng victory arrived, they credited Duan, rather than Wang, with the victory. After Wang subsequently failed to capture Yangliu and was forced to withdraw, they further spoke against Wang, so Zhu Zhen removed Wang from his post and recalled him to Daliang, replacing him with Duan, despite fervent opposition by Li Zhen, the chancellor Jing Xiang, and the senior military governor Zhang Zongshi.

After he was commissioned to be the supreme commander against Later Tang, Duan crossed the Yellow River and headed for Chan Prefecture (澶州, in modern Anyang, Henan) and prepared an ambitious four-prong attack against Later Tang:

1. Dong Zhang would head toward the major Later Tang city Taiyuan (formerly Jin's capital).
2. Huo Yanwei would head toward Zhen Prefecture (鎮州, in modern Baoding, Hebei, formerly Zhao's capital).
3. Wang Yanzhang and Zhang Hanjie (張漢傑, Consort Zhang's brother) would head toward Yun Prefecture.
4. Duan himself, along with Du Yanqiu, would confront Later Tang's Emperor Zhuangzong.

Duan's masterplan, however, was revealed by the Later Liang officer Kang Yanxiao, who defected to Later Tang around this time. Under the advice of Kang and Guo Chongtao, Emperor Zhuangzong, instead of taking up Duan's challenge, took his main forces and swiftly went to Yun Prefecture to rendezvous with Li Siyuan, and then confronted the smaller army that Wang and Zhang commanded. He defeated them and took them captive, and, with their army being the only thing that stood between him and Daliang, quickly advanced toward Daliang. With Duan's army trapped north of the Yellow River and unable to return to Daliang to defend it, Zhu Zhen, believing capture to be imminent, committed suicide, ending Later Liang. Duan subsequently surrendered to Emperor Zhuangzong, whose Later Tang state then took over all of Later Liang territory.

== Service during Later Tang ==
=== Under Emperor Zhuangzong ===
Emperor Zhuangzong accepted the surrenders of not only Duan Ning, but virtually the entire Later Liang government, but it was said that when the other former Later Liang officials saw Duan, they resented him bitterly for bringing disaster on the state and for what they considered shamelessness. Meanwhile, Du Yanqiu and Duan submitted a joint accusation against a number of Zhu Zhen's close associates; in response, Emperor Zhuangzong put those of Zhu Zhen's close associates to death. Meanwhile, Duan ingratiated himself with Emperor Zhuangzong's favorite performer Jing Jin (景進) and, through Jing, Emperor Zhuangzong's favorite consort Lady Liu; as a result, Emperor Zhuangzong made him the acting military governor of Yicheng Circuit (義成, headquartered in modern Anyang) and gave him the imperial surname of Li, along with a new name of Shaoqin.

Li Shaoqin was subsequently made full military governor of Yicheng, and then moved to Taining Circuit (泰寧, headquartered in modern Jining, Shandong). While serving at Taining, he took much money from the Taining circuit treasury for his own use, and the treasury officials demanded that he repay the circuit treasury. However, Emperor Zhuangzong excused him from having to pay back the treasury despite Guo Chongtao's requesting the repayment as well. In 924, Li Shaoqin served under Emperor Zhuangzong's trusted eunuch Li Shaohong in defending against Khitan attacks, and took the opportunity to ingratiate himself with Li Shaohong. In 925, he became the military governor of Weisheng Circuit (威勝, headquartered in modern Nanyang, Henan).

In 925, Emperor Zhuangzong was preparing for a major campaign to conquer Later Tang's southwestern neighbor Former Shu. Li Shaohong recommended Li Shaoqin as the commander of the army against Former Shu, arguing that Li Shaoqin was talented, but Guo opposed Li Shaoqin as treacherous and unreliable. Subsequently, at Guo's suggestion, Emperor Zhuangzong commissioned his oldest son, Li Jiji the Prince of Wei, as the supreme commander, with Guo serving as Li Jiji's deputy.

The army commanded by Li Jiji and Guo quickly destroyed Former Shu, but in light of Former Shu's destruction, Emperor Zhuangzong and Lady Liu (by this point empress) came to suspect Guo of planning to take over Former Shu lands himself. Empress Liu thereafter issued an edict herself, without Emperor Zhuangzong's approval, ordering Guo's death. Guo's death, coupled with Emperor Zhuangzong's and Empress Liu's refusal to issue material rewards to the soldiers, led to mutinies throughout the land, with one of the major mutinies at Yedu. Li Shaohong again recommended Li Shaoqin to serve as the commander of the forces against the Yedu mutineers, and this time, Emperor Zhuangzong agreed. However, when Li Shaoqin became to put together his staff, his staff consisted entirely of former Later Liang officers whom Li Shaoqin favored. Emperor Zhuangzong became suspicious of this and cancelled Li Shaoqin's commission, putting Li Siyuan in charge of the army against the Yedu mutineers instead.

Once Li Siyuan reached Yedu, however, his own soldiers forced him to join the Yedu mutineers. He subsequently attacked south, but even before he could reach the capital Luoyang, Emperor Zhuangzong was killed in another mutiny at Luoyang, allowing him to subsequently enter Luoyang without major opposition.

=== Under Emperor Mingzong ===
As one of Li Siyuan's main supporters was Li Shaozhen (i.e., Huo Yanwei, whose name had been changed by Emperor Zhuangzong to Li Shaozhen but who would soon thereafter change back to the original name), Li Shaozhen assumed much of the authority in Luoyang. He resented Li Shaoqin and Li Shaochong (i.e., Wen Tao, whose name had been changed by Emperor Zhuangzong as well), and therefore had them arrested and planned to kill them. Li Siyuan's main strategist, An Chonghui, however, warned Li Shaozhen that he lacked such authority and should not be taking vengeance on Li Shaoqin and Li Shaochong for their crimes during Later Liang. Li Siyuan (who was at this point claiming the title of regent and not yet emperor) soon issued an order stripping Li Shaoqin and Li Shaochong of their imperial names (i.e., restoring them to their original names) and their posts, sending them back to their homes.

In 927, Li Siyuan (who had declared himself emperor by this point, as Emperor Mingzong) further exiled Duan Ning to Liao Prefecture (遼州, in modern Jinzhong, Shanxi) and Wen Tao to De Prefecture (德州, in modern Dezhou, Shandong). In 928, he issued another edict condemning Duan and Wen for their treacherousness and ordered that they commit suicide.

== Notes and references ==
- History of the Five Dynasties, vol. 73.
- New History of the Five Dynasties, vol. 45.
- Zizhi Tongjian, vols. 268, 271, 272, 273, 274, 275, 276.
