= Guo Chongtao =

Chinese general

Guo Chongtao (Chinese: 郭崇韜) (died February 20, 926), courtesy name Anshi (安時), formally the Duke of Zhao Commandery (趙郡公), was a Chinese military general and politician of the Later Tang dynasty and its predecessor state, the Former Jin. He served as the chief of staff for Later Tang's founding emperor Li Cunxu (Emperor Zhuangzong) from before the time of the Later Tang's establishment and was instrumental in the Later Tang's destruction of its rivals Later Liang and Former Shu, but came under suspicion after Former Shu's destruction. Despite that suspicion, the Emperor Zhuangzong did not initially intend to kill him, but the Emperor Zhuangzong's wife Empress Liu issued an order herself and had him executed.

== Background ==
It is not known when Guo Chongtao was born, but it is known that he was from Yanmen (present-day Daixian, Shanxi). All that is known about his family origins is that his father was named Guo Hongzheng (郭宏正). Guo Chongtao started his military career serving as a follower of Li Kexiu (李克脩), a cousin of the major late-Tang dynasty warlord Li Keyong the military governor (jiedushi) of Hedong Circuit (河東, headquartered in modern Taiyuan, Shanxi). While Li Kexiu served as the military governor of Zhaoyi Circuit (昭義, headquartered in modern Changzhi, Shanxi), Guo was in charge of much of the affairs of his headquarters and became known for capability and honesty.

After Li Kexiu's death, Li Keyong took Guo onto his own staff to serve as an attendant. After a successful diplomatic mission to Fengxiang Circuit (鳳翔, headquartered in modern Baoji, Shaanxi), then ruled by the warlord Li Maozhen), Li Keyong made him the discipline officer. It was said that Guo became known for being dextrous and capable in reacting to the situation.

== During Jin ==
The last Tang emperor, Emperor Ai, was forced to yield the throne to the major warlord (and Li Keyong's archrival) Zhu Quanzhong the military governor of Xuanwu Circuit (宣武, headquartered in modern Kaifeng, Henan) in 907, and Zhu declared himself emperor of a new Later Liang (as its Emperor Taizu). Li Keyong and several other major warlords (Li Maozhen, Wang Jian, and Yang Wo) refused to recognize the new Later Liang state, and effectively became rulers of their own states (in Li Keyong's case, Jin, as he carried the Tang-bestowed title of Prince of Jin). In 908, Li Keyong died and was succeeded as the Prince of Jin by his son Li Cunxu. Guo continued to serve Li Cunxu, and it was said that Li Cunxu valued his service.

In the late 910s, Li Cunxu had the trusted eunuch Li Shaohong and the official Meng Zhixiang (the husband of his cousin, who would later receive the title of Grand Princess Qionghua during his reign as emperor) serving as his chiefs of staff (中門使, Zhongmenshi). At Meng's recommendation, Guo was made the deputy chief of staff in 917. When the major general Zhou Dewei the military governor of Lulong Circuit (盧龍, headquartered in modern Beijing) died in battle in 918, Li Cunxu was forced to take over the command of Lulong himself and dispatch Li Shaohong to Lulong to actually take control. As prior chiefs of staff had often received punishment from Li Cunxu, however, Meng did not want to remain chief of staff, particularly by himself and wished to resign the post. Li Cunxu required him to nominate a successor, and Meng recommended Guo. Li Cunxu accepted the recommendation, and made Guo the chief of staff. It was said that thereafter, Guo became in charge of the affairs of Li Cunxu's headquarters and followed Li Cunxu through his campaigns against Later Liang.

Later in 919, there was an incident when Guo opined that Li Cunxu was having too many people attending meals with him, and wanted Li Cunxu to reduce the size of these meal gatherings. Li Cunxu, in anger, told his secretary Feng Dao to draft a declaration stating that he was going to leave the command of his main army to someone else and return to Hedong's capital Taiyuan by himself. Feng, however, defused the situation by persuading Li Cunxu that Guo was not faulty in his suggestion. Guo subsequently apologized, and this matter did not affect their relationship significantly at that time.

In 921, at a time when Li Cunxu was faced with battling rebels at Chengde Circuit (成德, headquartered in modern Shijiazhuang, Hebei) led by Zhang Chujin, while, at Zhang's inducement, Khitan Empire's Emperor Taizu was invading from the north, intending to aid Zhang. Khitan forces were initially successful in advancing deep into Jin territory, going through Lulong and Yiwu (義武, headquartered in modern Baoding, Hebei) Circuits, and most generals suggested to Li Cunxu that Khitan forces were too difficult to combat with on their own; instead, they suggested abandoning the siege on Chengde's capital Zhen Prefecture (鎮州) and withdrawing completely back from the region back to Hedong. Guo, however, pointed out that Khitan forces were fearful of Li Cunxu's reputation and had only invaded due to inducements by Wang Yu (王郁, a Khitan officer and son to Yiwu's former military governor Wang Chuzhi); he suggested facing Khitan forces directly, believing that even a small victory would cause Khitan forces to withdraw. Li Cunxu agreed with his suggestion and faced Khitan forces directly, and, after a Jin victory, Khitan forces withdrew. When Jin forces subsequently captured Zhen Prefecture, Li Cunxu sent Guo to gather the contents of the Chengde treasury. It was said that despite the opportunity to take from the treasury and despite many people offering him bribes, Guo took nothing from the treasury, and instead used the chance to purchase books from the people of Chengde.

== During Later Tang ==
=== The campaign to destroy Later Liang ===
In spring 923, Li Cunxu, then at Wei Prefecture (魏州, in modern Handan, Hebei, renamed Xingtang (興唐) shortly after), declared himself the emperor of a new Later Tang (as Emperor Zhuangzong). He commissioned Guo Chongtao and a senior eunuch, Zhang Juhan, as chiefs of staff (now with the title changed to Shumishi). (The new emperor also summoned Li Shaohong back from Lulong, but with the ambitious Guo not wanting Li Shaohong, whom he had previously served under, becoming chief of staff again (since Li Shaohong would effectively be more senior than he was), Guo dissuaded Emperor Zhuangzong from making Li Shaohong chief of staff and recommended Zhang instead; this incident caused Li Shaohong, who was instead made the director of palace affairs, resentful of Guo.) Meanwhile, the official Kong Qian, who had long been overseeing the responsibility of supplying the Jin forces, wanted to be the director of material pricing (i.e., overseeing the three financial agencies in charge of taxation, treasury, and salt and iron monopolies), but the other officials opined that Kong lacked a lengthy career and came from low birth, and so Guo recommended the senior official Zhang Xian (張憲) instead, having Kong made Zhang Xian's deputy; this also displeased Kong.

Despite the declaration of himself as emperor, Emperor Zhuangzong was actually facing some difficult times at that time—it was said that due to frequent Khitan pillaging incursions, Lulong lacked sufficient food supplies; meanwhile, a recent Later Liang counterattack had caused Later Tang to lose Wei Prefecture (衛州, in modern Puyang, Henan, not the same Wei Prefecture where Emperor Zhuangzong was at that time) to Later Liang; further, Li Jitao the military governor of Anyi Circuit (安義, i.e., Zhaoyi, as he was the son of Emperor Zhuangzong's deceased cousin Li Sizhao and the circuit was therefore renamed to observe naming taboo for Li Sizhao) had also rebelled and submitted to Later Liang. The Later Tang morale was thus low at the time. However, at that time, the Later Liang officer Lu Shunmi (盧順密) of Tianping Circuit (天平, headquartered in modern Tai'an, Shandong) defected to Later Tang and exposed the fact that Tianping's capital Yun Prefecture (鄆州), deeply inside Later Liang territory south of the Yellow River (which formed the de facto boundary between Later Tang and Later Liang at that time, notwithstanding Later Tang's recent loss of Wei Prefecture and Anyi Circuit, both of which were north of the Yellow River), was poorly defended, with its military governor Dai Siyuan serving as the overall commander of Later Liang forces against Later Tang at that time and therefore away from the circuit. When Lu further suggested a surprise attack on Tianping, Guo opposed, finding the plan too risky. However, Emperor Zhuangzong's adoptive brother Li Siyuan advocated for the plan, believing that to break the stalemate with Later Liang, a risky move was necessary. Emperor Zhuangzong thus commissioned Li Siyuan to carry out the attack, and Li Siyuan subsequently captured Yun Prefecture in a surprise attack.

In reaction, Later Liang's emperor Zhu Zhen relieved Dai of his command and replaced him with Wang Yanzhang, who immediately launched an attack on the Later Tang city of Desheng (德勝, in modern Puyang), whose two parts straddled the Yellow River, capturing the southern city of Desheng. Wang then headed east on the river, intending to capture Yangliu (楊劉, in modern Liaocheng, Shandong), to control the Yellow River crossings in the region so that the Later Tang forces at Yun would be isolated and have their supplies cut off. Guo, however, foresaw this situation and advised Emperor Zhuangzong to immediately build another fort at Majiakou (馬家口, also in modern Liaocheng) to allow another crossing point, while distracting Wang by sending other forces to harass his army. Emperor Zhuangzong agreed and did so, sending Guo to build the fort and defend it, and meanwhile, Yangliu's defenses were holding under the capable Later Tang general Li Zhou (李周). By the time that Wang realized that a new fort was being built at Majiakou and attacked it, the fort was sufficiently complete that Guo was able to hold off his attack until Emperor Zhuangzong arrived to force Wang's withdrawal.

Despite the victory at Majiakou, the Later Tang army's military supplies were low, and there were rumors of an impending major Khitan attack to the north. Further, after Zhu Zhen then replaced Wang with Duan Ning (because Zhu Zhen's close associates, led by his brother-in-law Zhao Yan, resented Wang for speaking against them), Duan planned an ambitious multi-prong assault against Later Tang, and the plans were becoming known to Later Tang. Li Shaohong advocated negotiating a peace accord with Later Liang—exchanging Tianping for Wei Prefecture and Liyang, with the two states formally setting their boundary at the Yellow River. Guo, in consultation with the recently defected Later Liang officer Kang Yanxiao, opposed, however, believing that this was the time to use Tianping as a launchpad to destroy Later Liang and that, if Emperor Zhuangzong did not attempt to do so, even if there were a peace agreement, the Later Tang morale would become so low that its people would scatter. Emperor Zhuangzong agreed.

In fall 923, Duan started his multi-prong plan. Under Duan's plan, he himself would cross the Yellow River north to Chan Prefecture (澶州, in modern Anyang, Henan), and then the Later Liang army would launch in four different prongs:

1. Dong Zhang would head toward the major Later Tang city Taiyuan (formerly Jin's capital).
2. Huo Yanwei would head toward Zhen Prefecture (鎮州, Chengde's capital).
3. Wang and Zhang Hanjie (張漢傑, the brother of Zhu Zhen's deceased wife Consort Zhang) would head toward Yun Prefecture.
4. Duan himself, along with Du Yanqiu, would confront Emperor Zhuangzong, then at Xingtang.

Wang's assault on Yun, however, was repelled by Li Siyuan, causing Wang to retreat to Zhongdu (中都, in modern Jining, Shandong). Emperor Zhuangzong decided to carry out the plan advocated by Guo and Kang. He left Xingtang and joined Li Siyuan at Yun, and then attacked Wang at Zhongdu, capturing him and Zhang. He then headed directly for the Later Liang capital Daliang, which was left defenseless under Duan's multi-prong assault plan. Zhu Zhen, in panic, committed suicide before Emperor Zhuangzong could arrive, ending Later Liang.

=== Governance after Later Liang's destruction ===
After Emperor Zhuangzong entered Daliang, he put Guo Chongtao temporarily in charge of the Office of the Chancellors, as the chancellor Doulu Ge was then still at Xingtang. After Doulu subsequently arrived, Emperor Zhuangzong gave Guo the chancellor designation of Shizhong (侍中) and also made him the military governor of Chengde—but kept him at the central government to continue to serve as chief of staff. It was said that Guo was, at that time, in charge of both governmental and military matters, and that he was faithful and diligent in offering opinions and recommendations on policy and personnel. Although Doulu was chancellor, Guo was effectively managing the entire government. It was at Guo's suggestion that Emperor Zhuangzong shortly after began to issue new commissions to the Later Liang military governors and prefects who had submitted to him. However, when Guo specifically picked out one of the Later Liang military governors, Wen Tao (溫韜), asking for Emperor Zhuangzong to punish Wen for having excavated and stolen from the imperial tombs of the Tang dynasty (as Later Tang was declaring itself an extension of Tang), Emperor Zhuangzong declined, citing the general pardon that he declared when he entered Daliang. Also, when Gao Jixing the Later Liang military governor of Jingnan Circuit (荊南, headquartered in modern Jingzhou, Hubei) arrived to pay tribute to the emperor, Emperor Zhuangzong initially wanted to detain him, but Guo, citing the fact that detaining Gao might cause other military governors to fear for themselves, advocated releasing Gao back to his Jingnan post, and Emperor Zhuangzong agreed. Meanwhile, because the popular opinion at the time was that Guo, as a general who became a chancellor, was not sufficiently well-versed in Tang regulations, additional senior officers should be commissioned as chancellors to assist him. Guo thus recommended Zhao Guangyin and Wei Yue, who were then commissioned as chancellors. Meanwhile, Kong Qian, wanting to become the director of material pricing, suggested to Guo that Xingtang required a capable senior official to defend it and that Zhang Xian would be appropriate, but his plan was foiled when Guo, while recommending Zhang to become the defender of Xingtang, recommended that Doulu take over the director of material pricing office as an additional office.

In 924, Kong made another attempt to be director of material pricing, by stating to Guo that due to Doulu's busyness as chancellor, the financial matters were being overlooked. Further, at that time, Doulu had made an unauthorized loan to himself, and Kong presented the evidence to Guo. After Guo spoke to Doulu about it, Doulu, in fear, offered the office to Guo instead, but Guo declined, and instead recommended that Zhang be recalled from Xingtang to serve as director. Emperor Zhuangzong agreed, and Kong was disappointed again. However, Kong then spoke with Doulu, arguing that Xingtang was such an important city that it required someone who had the ability to make independent decisions, and that the mayor of Xingtang, Wang Zhengyan (王正言), was not capable of doing that. Kong suggested instead that Zhang be kept at Xingtang and that Wang be made the director of material pricing—believing that, as the deputy of the incompetent Wang, he could effectively run the agencies himself. Doulu spoke with Guo, and Guo agreed. (Yet later, after Wang suffered a stroke, Kong, due to efforts by Emperor Zhuangzong's favorite performer Jing Jin (景進), was able to become the director of material pricing.)

After Emperor Zhuangzong shortly after offered sacrifices to heaven and earth at Luoyang (which he made his capital), he created Guo the Duke of Zhao Commandery, and also granted Guo an iron certificate pre-pardoning him from death 10 times. Meanwhile, Guo had previously had a reputation for complete honesty and not accepting bribes, but after Later Tang's conquest of Later Liang, he began to accept bribes from the local governors. When his associates questioned him on the matter, he argued that it was necessary because Later Liang had a political culture of briberies, and that if he refused the bribes, the former Later Liang officials might come to fear that he was not truly accepting as Later Tang subjects, and therefore he had to; he further stated that he was only safekeeping the money for the state. When Emperor Zhuangzong was offering sacrifices, he offered part of that collected money to award to the soldiers. However, when the treasury officials informed Emperor Zhuangzong that the imperial treasury should also award money to the soldiers, the stingy Emperor Zhuangzong refused, only taking moneys that were confiscated from Li Jitao (who was put to death after Emperor Zhuangzong's conquest of Later Liang) to give to the soldiers.

Meanwhile, Guo, due to his hold on power, was becoming resented by eunuchs that Emperor Zhuangzong trusted. (He tried to alleviate Li Shaohong's resentment by creating a new post of Zhonggoushi (中勾使) for Li Shaohong to review the financial matters, but the move failed to placate Li Shaohong.) He was also drawing resentment from army officers who had contributions in Later Liang's destruction, as he, encouraged by Doulu to associate his own bloodline with that of the great Tang general Guo Ziyi, looked down on those who had low births despite their battlefield accomplishments. With resentment against him piling up, Guo became fearful and considered requesting to be relieved from the chief of staff post and head for Chengde to serve as military governor there. A close associate, however, discouraged him, arguing that once he left the imperial government, he would easily fall pray to accusations. Instead, the associate suggested to him that he suggest Emperor Zhuangzong to create Emperor Zhuangzong's favorite concubine Consort Liu empress, to create an alliance with Empress Liu. Guo did so, and Emperor Zhuangzong subsequently created Consort Liu empress (notwithstanding the fact that his wife, as prince, was Consort Han). At the same time, Guo also reformed the system of officials using false genealogical connections to claim entitlement to governmental offices, reducing such claims by 90%.

In 925, while considering what to do with the incessant Khitan incursions, Guo offered to yield his commission as the military governor of Chengde to Li Siyuan, so that Li Siyuan could more adequately serve as support for Li Shaobin the military governor of Lulong. Emperor Zhuangzong agreed, and wanted to give Guo the commission of military governor of Xuanwu Circuit (宣武, headquartered at Bian Prefecture (汴州), i.e., Daliang) instead. Guo pointed out that Bian Prefecture was an important post and that given he was remaining as chief of staff, the important matters at Xuanwu would not be attended to, and declined the commission. Emperor Zhuangzong agreed. (However, Guo would eventually come to suspect Li Siyuan of being a potential threat to the imperial governance, and secretly suggested Emperor Zhuangzong to strip him of his command and kill him; Emperor Zhuangzong refused.)

Guo continued to be attentive to the budgetary concerns that the state was facing, and when Emperor Zhuangzong built towers in the palace to try to escape the heat, Guo tried to urge him against it, to no avail, only drawing accusations from eunuchs that Guo himself had a cool mansion and therefore was unconcerned about the emperor. Late in 925, Emperor Zhuangzong's favorite eunuchs and performers, who were not able to get one of Guo's trusted officials, Luo Guan (羅貫) the magistrate of Luoyang County (one of the two counties making up the city of Luoyang), to bend to their requests—indeed, Luo was relaying their requests to Guo to allow Guo to be aware of what they were doing—accused Luo of not properly maintaining roads and bridges within the county. As a result, Luo was put to death, despite Guo's attempt to intercede for him.

=== The campaign to destroy Former Shu ===
In winter 925, Emperor Zhuangzong prepared to launch a campaign against Later Tang's southwestern neighbor Former Shu, whose emperor Wang Zongyan whose rule he considered weak and corrupt. He considered whom to commission as the overall commander of the operations, and Li Shaohong, as Duan Ning (who was by this point using the Emperor Zhuangzong-bestowed name of Li Shaoqin) had long flattered him, recommended Li Shaoqin. Guo, pointing out that Li Shaoqin was once a general for the fallen Later Liang and arguing that Li Shaoqin was wicked, opposed. When some other officials recommended Li Siyuan, he argued that Li Siyuan had to be available on the northern border to defend against Khitan; rather, he suggested that Emperor Zhuangzong's oldest son, Li Jiji the Prince of Wei, should be the overall commander, in order to build up his battlefield reputation. Emperor Zhuangzong agreed—but then pointed out that Li Jiji was too young to oversee the operations himself, made Guo the deputy commander, in actual charge of the military operations. Before departing, Guo recommended Meng Zhixiang to eventually be the military governor of Former Shu's main territory, Xichuan Circuit (西川), and recommended Zhang Xiang to be chancellor.

However, the path into Former Shu territory was mountainous and treacherous, causing much apprehension among the Later Tang ranks, particularly when Li Jiyan the military governor of Fengxiang (Li Maozhen's son and successor, who had submitted to Later Tang) was unable to supply the Later Tang army adequately with food. Guo's strategist Li Yu, however, argued that the Former Shu people were so alienated by Wang Yan's corrupt rule that once the Later Tang army drove deep into Former Shu territory, the officials and generals would be submitting in droves. Guo agreed, and when his army reached Former Shu's Wuxing Circuit (武興, headquartered in modern Baoji, Shaanxi), Wuxing's military governor Wang Chengjie (王承捷) surrendered quickly, and with Wuxing's capital Feng Prefecture (鳳州) well-supplied with food, the Later Tang army's food shortage issue was solved. As he continued to advance, many Former Shu local governors did in fact submit quickly. When Kang Yanxiao (by this point using the Emperor Zhuangzong-bestowed name of Li Shaochen) crushed a major Former Shu army crushed by Wang Yan's adoptive brothers Wang Zongxun (王宗勳), Wang Zongyan (王宗儼), and Wang Zongyu (王宗昱), the Former Shu army continued to fail, with Wang Yan himself fleeing back from the forward post of Li Prefecture (利州, in modern Guangyuan, Sichuan) back to the capital Chengdu, leaving Li under the control of his adoptive brother and major general Wang Zongbi.

Wang Zongbi, however, by this time was getting ready to betray Wang Yan. He shortly after returned to Chengdu, and used his army to seize Wang Yan and the imperial household. He forced Wang Yan to agree to surrender to Later Tang, and subsequently, Wang Yan had his officials draft an official submission and letter of surrender to Later Tang, addressing them to Li Jiji and Guo. (Shortly after, he had his son Wang Chengban (王承班) greet Li Jiji and Guo, offering them gifts and requesting to be the military governor of Xichuan. However, Li Jiji responded, "These now belong to my household. How does it come to you to offer them?" He kept the gifts and turned Wang Chengban away.) Once the Later Tang army arrived at Chengdu, Wang Yan carried out a formal traditional surrender testimony, wearing white, tying a rope around his neck, and holding jade in his mouth to show submission. Li Jiji accepted the jade, and Guo then unbound Wang Yan and burned his mourning clothes, to show the acceptance of the surrender, ending Former Shu.

=== Aftermaths of Former Shu's destruction ===
One of the things that Guo had to immediately deal with was a conflict between his generals Dong Zhang and Li Shaochen. Li Shaochen had greater accomplishments in the campaign, but Guo was closer to and often consulted strategic matters with Dong. The conflict boiled into arguments where Li Shaochen threatened Dong's life. As a result, Guo recommended Dong to be the military governor of Dongchuan Circuit (東川, headquartered in modern Mianyang, Sichuan), to separate him from Li Shaochen. Li Shaochen, who believed that he deserved the Dongchuan command, met with Guo and tried to dissuade him—offering, as an alternative, Ren Huan, who was capable in both civilian and military matters. Guo, however, responded, "You, Li Shaochen, are rebelling; how do you dare to disobey my orders?" Li Shaochen thereafter withdrew from his presence in fear.

However, a bigger problem was developing for Guo. Even though Li Jiji was the son of the emperor and the titular overall commander, Guo was in de facto control of the army, so officials and generals were always trying to ingratiate themselves with him, while very few went to see Li Jiji. Further, the former Former Shu officials were giving both him and his son Guo Tinghui (郭廷誨) bribes, hoping for positions in the new Later Tang administration. Very little of the treasures went to Li Jiji, further causing resentment from Li Jiji and his attendants, led by the eunuch Li Congxi (李從襲).

Meanwhile, Guo Chongtao had promised Wang Zongbi the post of military governor of Xichuan, but did not actually made the recommendation to Emperor Zhuangzong. To put pressure on Guo, Wang Zongbi led a group of Former Shu officials and publicly met with Li Jiji, recommending Guo to be the military governor of Xichuan. Li Jiji began to suspect Guo of wanting to occupy the Shu lands and separate from Later Tang, and he stated to Guo, "The Lord [(i.e., Emperor Zhuangzong)] depends on you, Shizhong, like a mountain and would not let you leave the imperial government. How would he want to abandon you, with so much accomplishments, in a wild land? This is not something I would dare to discuss. Have those men go to the palace [(i.e., Luoyang)] to beg the Lord themselves." As, at that time, the former Former Shu eunuch-general Song Guangbao (宋光葆), whose brother Song Guangsi Wang Zongbi had killed in a purge subsequent to his seizure of Wang Yan, made accusations against Wang Zongbi, and Wang Zongbi was also refusing to surrender more wealth from the treasury to reward the Later Tang soldiers, the soldiers were clamoring. In order to clear himself, Guo had Wang Zongbi, along with his allies Wang Zongxun and Wang Zongwo (王宗渥), arrested and executed.

=== Death ===
While Emperor Zhuangzong granted Guo the authority to commission officers in the former Former Shu lands, his suspicion against Guo was increasing in Guo's absence. In particular, because little funds were delivered to Luoyang after Former Shu's destruction, he came to suspect that Guo had himself taken the funds, and was planning to seize Li Jiji and control the Shu lands. Further, when he sent the eunuch Xiang Yansi (向延嗣) to Chengdu to order Guo to try to speed up the takeover of Shu and then return with the troops to Luoyang, Guo refused to greet Xiang politely, and therefore, upon Xiang's returns, Xiang embellished on the amount of Shu treasures that Guo and Guo Tinghui had taken. While Emperor Zhuangzong did not fully believe Xiang, Empress Liu did, and was continuously begging Emperor Zhuangzong to take decisive action to save her son Li Jiji. Emperor Zhuangzong, thereafter, as he was sending Meng off to Chengdu to serve as the military governor of Xichuan, stated to Meng, "We heard that Guo Chongtao has other thoughts. When you get there, kill him for us." Meng responded, however, "Guo Chongtao is an old, distinguished subject of yours. He would surely not do that. I, your subject, will examine him when I get to Shu lands. If I see nothing wrong, I will send him back." Emperor Zhuangzong agreed.

After Meng departed, however, Emperor Zhuangzong was prepared to send another eunuch, Ma Yangui (馬彥珪), with the same instructions—to observe Guo, and if he saw signs of rebellion, kill Guo. However, Ma privately met with Empress Liu, and pointed out that he would have no opportunity to request Emperor Zhuangzong to review the situation given the distance between Luoyang and Chengdu. Empress Liu again tried to persuade Emperor Zhuangzong to simply issue an order for Guo's death, but Emperor Zhuangzong refused. Empress Liu decided to issue an order in her own name to Li Jiji, ordering him to kill Guo. Ma took Empress Liu's order and departed for Chengdu, at a higher speed than Meng. On the way, he met Meng and informed Meng of Empress Liu's order. Meng, while lamenting that this situation would create a disaster, did not outwardly disobey the order, but decided to trail Ma quickly thereafter as well.

Meanwhile, Emperor Zhuangzong's trusted eunuchs and performers were also making similar accusations against another major general, Li Jilin the military governor of Huguo Circuit (護國, headquartered in modern Yuncheng, Shanxi). Believing that if he had a chance to meet Emperor Zhuangzong to speak on his own behalf and Guo's that he might be able to save himself and Guo, Li Jilin went to Luoyang to pay tribute to the emperor. Shortly after, Ma arrived in Chengdu. Li Jiji, upon reading Empress Liu's order, initially hesitated, as he himself was about to depart Chengdu along with Guo. However, Li Congxi and the other eunuchs begged him to carry out the order, pointing out that if Guo became aware of the order, he himself would be threatened. Li Jiji thus summoned Guo under the guise of a military consultation, and, as Guo arrived, had his follower Li Huan (李環) surprise Guo and kill him with a hammer. Li Jiji then also put Guo's sons Guo Tinghui and Guo Tingxin (郭廷信) to death.

Upon hearing the news of Guo Chongtao's death, Emperor Zhuangzong decided to affirm Empress Liu's orders by publicly accusing Guo of crimes and ordering that his sons Guo Tingshuo (郭廷說), Guo Tingrang (郭廷讓), and Guo Tingyi (郭廷議) be put to death, and his assets be confiscated. Shortly after, Li Jilin was also killed, with his family, as was Guo's son-in-law (Emperor Zhuangzong's younger brother) Li Cun'ai (李存乂) the Prince of Mu. In the aftermaths of the unjustified deaths of Guo and Li Jilin, many mutinies occurred throughout the Later Tang realm, with major ones led by Li Shaochen and Li Siyuan. Within a few months, Li Siyuan's rebel army was approaching Luoyang, when Emperor Zhuangzong was killed in a mutiny at Luoyang itself. Li Siyuan shortly after arrived at Luoyang and claimed imperial title (as Emperor Mingzong). He ordered that Guo be properly reburied at Taiyuan and that a mansion be granted to his widow Lady Zhou at Taiyuan. As Guo Tinghui and Guo Tingrang each had a young son who were hidden by their relatives and escaped death, these grandsons of Guo Chongtao's were given to Lady Zhou to be raised.

== Notes and references ==
- Old History of the Five Dynasties, vol. 57.
- New History of the Five Dynasties, vol. 24.
- Zizhi Tongjian, vols. 270, 271, 272, 273, 274.
