= Consort Han (Later Tang) =

Consort Han, imperial consort rank Shufei (韓淑妃, personal name unknown) was the first wife of Emperor Zhuangzong of Later Tang (Li Cunxu), the founding emperor of the Chinese Five Dynasties and Ten Kingdoms period Later Tang state. Despite her status as his wife, he bypassed her and created a favored concubine, Empress Liu, empress after he claimed imperial title.

== Background ==
It is not known when Lady Han was born, or what her family background was. It is also not known when she married Li Cunxu, but it appeared that it was before his becoming Prince of Jin, for it was said that she was his first-married wife and that a favorite concubine, Lady Hou, was taken in his victory over Later Liang forces and Lady Hou's then-husband, the Later Liang general Fu Daozhao (符道昭), was killed in battle — which occurred in 908, shortly after he inherited the title of Prince of Jin after his father Li Keyong's death. In any case, she was considered his wife, while the next-two ranked concubines were Lady Yi and Lady Liu.

== During Li Cunxu's reign as Prince of Jin ==
After Li Cunxu inherited the title of Prince of Jin from Li Keyong and shortly after captured Lady Hou, Lady Hou became a favorite concubine of his and often accompanied him on his campaigns. Lady Han, as his wife, was given the title of Lady of Wei (衛國夫人), but that title, while an honored one, was not greater than those given to Lady Yi (who was given the title of Lady of Yan) or Lady Liu (who was given the title of Lady of Wei (魏國夫人) — note different character than Lady Han's title), even though Lady Han continued to be recognized as Li Cunxu's rightful wife. Later, after Lady Liu gave birth to his oldest son Li Jiji, Li Cunxu favored her more as he believed Li Jiji to be a lot like himself, and therefore, on campaigns, Lady Liu displaced Lady Hou as the one accompanying him.

== During Li Cunxu's reign as Emperor Zhuangzong ==
In 923, Li Cunxu claimed the title of Emperor of Tang, establishing Later Tang as its Emperor Zhuangzong. Shortly after, he captured Daliang, the capital of his state's archrival Later Liang; Later Liang's final emperor Zhu Zhen committed suicide, ending that state. Shortly after, he wanted to create Lady Liu empress, but could not bring himself to do so, because Lady Han was his wife; also, his mother Empress Dowager Cao disliked Lady Liu, and his chief of staff Guo Chongtao also opposed elevating her over Lady Han. In 924, however, Guo, troubled over accusations that Emperor Zhuangzong's favorite eunuchs and performers were making against him, changed his mind and began supporting Lady Liu, believing that an alliance with her would ensure the emperor's continuing trust. Emperor Zhuangzong, with Guo supporting his wishes, thus created Lady Liu empress. Both Lady Han and Lady Yi were angry over Empress Liu's elevation over them, so Emperor Zhuangzong tried to placate them by carrying out formal creation ceremonies creating them honorable imperial consort titles — with Lady Han created Shufei and Lady Yi created Defei (德妃).

== After Emperor Zhuangzong's death ==
In 926, Emperor Zhuangzong was killed in a mutiny at the capital Luoyang. His adoptive brother Li Siyuan, who had earlier rebelled against him, quickly arrived at Luoyang and took the throne (as Emperor Mingzong). He continued to honor and supply Consorts Han and Yi. (Empress Liu, meanwhile, tried to flee to Jin's old capital Taiyuan with Emperor Zhuangzong's younger brother Li Cunwo (李存渥) the Prince of Shen, but was chased down by Emperor Mingzong's emissaries and killed.) Emperor Mingzong later ordered that Emperor Zhuangzong's imperial consorts be sent back to their homes, and Consorts Han and Yi took up residence at Taiyuan. When Emperor Mingzong's son-in-law Shi Jingtang rebelled against Emperor Mingzong's adoptive son and successor Li Congke in 936 and sought aid from the Khitan Emperor Taizong of Liao to the north, Khitan forces arrived at Taiyuan and took Consorts Han and Yi north. Nothing further was recorded in history about what happened to them.

Regnal titles
Preceded by Lady Liu	Consort to Prince of Jin/Emperor of Later Tang; 908–924	Succeeded by Empress Liu
Preceded by Lady Liu	Consort to Sovereign of China (Northern); 908–924	Succeeded by Empress Liu
Preceded by Empress Li and Empress Zhu of Yan	Consort to Sovereign of China (Beijing/Tianjin region); 914–924	Succeeded by Empress Liu
Preceded by Consort Zhang of Later Liang	Consort to Sovereign of China (most regions); 923–924	Succeeded by Empress Liu
