= Empress Chu =

Empress Chu (褚皇后) may refer to:

- Chu Suanzi (324–384), consort and empress dowager during the Jin dynasty, wife of Emperor Kang
- Chu Lingyuan (384–436), consort during the Jin dynasty, wife of Emperor Gong
- Chu Lingqu (fl. 496–501), consort during the Southern Qi dynasty

== See also ==
- Empress Zhu (disambiguation)
