= Empress Li (Liu Shouguang's wife) =

- Chinese: 李皇后
- Literal meaning: Empress Li
Transcriptions
Standard Mandarin
- Hanyu Pinyin: Lǐ Huánghòu
- Wade–Giles: Li Huang-hou

Empress Li (died 12 February 914), personal name unknown, was one of the two wives of Liu Shouguang, the only ruler of Yan during the Five Dynasties and Ten Kingdoms Era of Chinese history.

== Life ==
Very little is known about Empress Li. She shared her surname with the imperial clan of the Tang dynasty, but it was also frequently adopted or forced upon northern tribesmen during the era when they allied with the Tang or were pacified by them. It is unknown whether she bore any of Liu Shouguang's children, and it is even uncertain whether she was formally given the title of empress when Liu Shouguang declared himself an emperor in 911. The modern historian Bo Yang believes she was, as was Liu's other wife Empress Zhu.

In late 913, Li Cunxu, then Prince of Jin and later Emperor Zhuangzong of the Later Tang, besieged the Yan capital Youzhou (Beijing). Liu Shouguang, both his empresses, and his three sons Liu Jixun (劉繼珣), Liu Jifang (劉繼方), and Liu Jizuo (劉繼祚) all fled You Prefecture, but were eventually captured at Yanle (燕樂) within modern Beijing and delivered to Li Cunxu. He took them on a victory tour through the lands of his allies Wang Chuzhi, the military governor (jiedushi) of Yiwu around modern Baoding, Hebei, and Wang Rong, the Prince of Zhao. He then took them with him back to his capital Taiyuan and executed them. Both Empress Li and Empress Zhu are reported to have accepted their executions and to have rebuked Liu Shouguang for begging for his life rather than acting bravely like an emperor should.

Chinese nobility
New title	Empress of Yan; 911–914; With: Empress Zhu	Dynasty destroyed
Preceded by Empress He of the Tang dynasty	Empress of China (Beijing/Tianjin region); 911–914; With: Empress Zhu	Succeeded by Consort Han of Jin (as wife of sovereign)
Preceded by Empress He of the Tang dynasty	Empress of China (Cangzhou region); 911–912; With: Empress Zhu	Succeeded by Empress Zhang of Later Liang
