= Empress Ma (Southern Han) =

Empress Ma (馬皇后, personal name unknown) (died January 22, 935) was the only known empress of the Chinese Five Dynasties and Ten Kingdoms period state Southern Han. She was the wife of Southern Han's founding emperor Liu Yan (Emperor Gaozu), and the daughter of Ma Yin (Prince Wumu), the prince of Southern Han's northern neighbor Chu.

== Background ==
It is not known when the future Empress Ma was born. Further, while she was known to be a daughter of Ma Yin's, no historical record indicated who her mother was.

In 913, Liu Yan, who was then formally a Later Liang vassal (as Ma Yin was as well) as the military governor (jiedushi) of Qinghai Circuit (清海, headquartered in modern Guangzhou, Guangdong), sent emissaries to Ma Yin, asking to marry a daughter of his. Ma Yin agreed. In 915, Liu sent emissaries to Chu to welcome her; Ma Yin, in turn, sent his brother (her uncle) Ma Cun (馬存) to escort her to Qinghai's capital Guang Prefecture (廣州) for the wedding.

== Marriage with Liu Yan ==
In 917, Liu Yan declared himself emperor of a new state of Yue, independent from Later Liang. He did not create Lady Ma empress at that time, creating her only the Lady of Yue. In 919, by which time he had changed the name of his state from Yue to Han (and therefore the state became historically known as Southern Han), he created her empress.

Little else is known about Empress Ma's marriage with Liu Yan, and none of his sons was recorded as being born of her. She died in 935.

== Notes and references ==
- Spring and Autumn Annals of the Ten Kingdoms (十國春秋), vol. 61.
- Zizhi Tongjian, vols. 268, 269, 270, 279.

Regnal titles
Preceded by Consort Zhang of Later Liang	Empress of China (Guangdong/Guangxi); 919–935	Succeeded by Empress Song of the Song dynasty
