= Empress Zhu (Liu Shouguang's wife) =

Wife of Liu Shouguang, emperor of Yan

Empress Zhu (祝皇后, personal name unknown) (died February 12, 914) was one of the two wives of Liu Shouguang, the only emperor of the Chinese Five Dynasties and Ten Kingdoms period state Yan.

Very little is known about Empress Zhu, and it is not known whether she bore any of Liu Shouguang's children. (Indeed, it is not completely clear that she was given an empress title when he declared himself emperor in 911, although the modern Chinese historian Bo Yang asserted that she was, as was Liu's other wife Empress Li.) When Yan's capital You Prefecture (幽州, in modern Beijing) fell in late 913 under siege by Li Cunxu the Prince of Jin, she, Liu Shouguang, Empress Li, and Liu Shouguang's three sons Liu Jixun (劉繼珣), Liu Jifang (劉繼方), and Liu Jizuo (劉繼祚) fled You Prefecture, but were eventually captured at Yanle (燕樂, in modern Beijing) and delivered to Li Cunxu. (They were captured after Liu Shouguang had sent Empress Zhu out of their hiding place to beg for food; the farmer Zhang Shizao (張師造) realized who she was and forced her to reveal where Liu Shouguang was; he then took them captive.) Li Cunxu took them on a victory tour through the lands of his allies Wang Chuzhi the military governor of Yiwu Circuit (義武, headquartered in modern Baoding, Hebei) and Wang Rong the Prince of Zhao, but eventually took them back to his capital Taiyuan and executed them there. As they were to be executed, Liu Shouguang was begging for his life, and Empresses Li and Zhu rebuked him for not acting bravely like an emperor should, while they accepted their own executions.

== Notes and references ==
Chinese nobility
New title	Empress of Yan; 911–914; With: Empress Li	Dynasty destroyed
Preceded by Empress He of the Tang dynasty	Empress of China (Beijing/Tianjin region); 911–914; With: Empress Li	Succeeded by Consort Han of Jin (as wife of sovereign)
Preceded by Empress He of the Tang dynasty	Empress of China (Cangzhou region); 911–912; With: Empress Li	Succeeded by Empress Zhang of Later Liang
