= Wang Yanzhang =

Chinese army general

- 王彥章
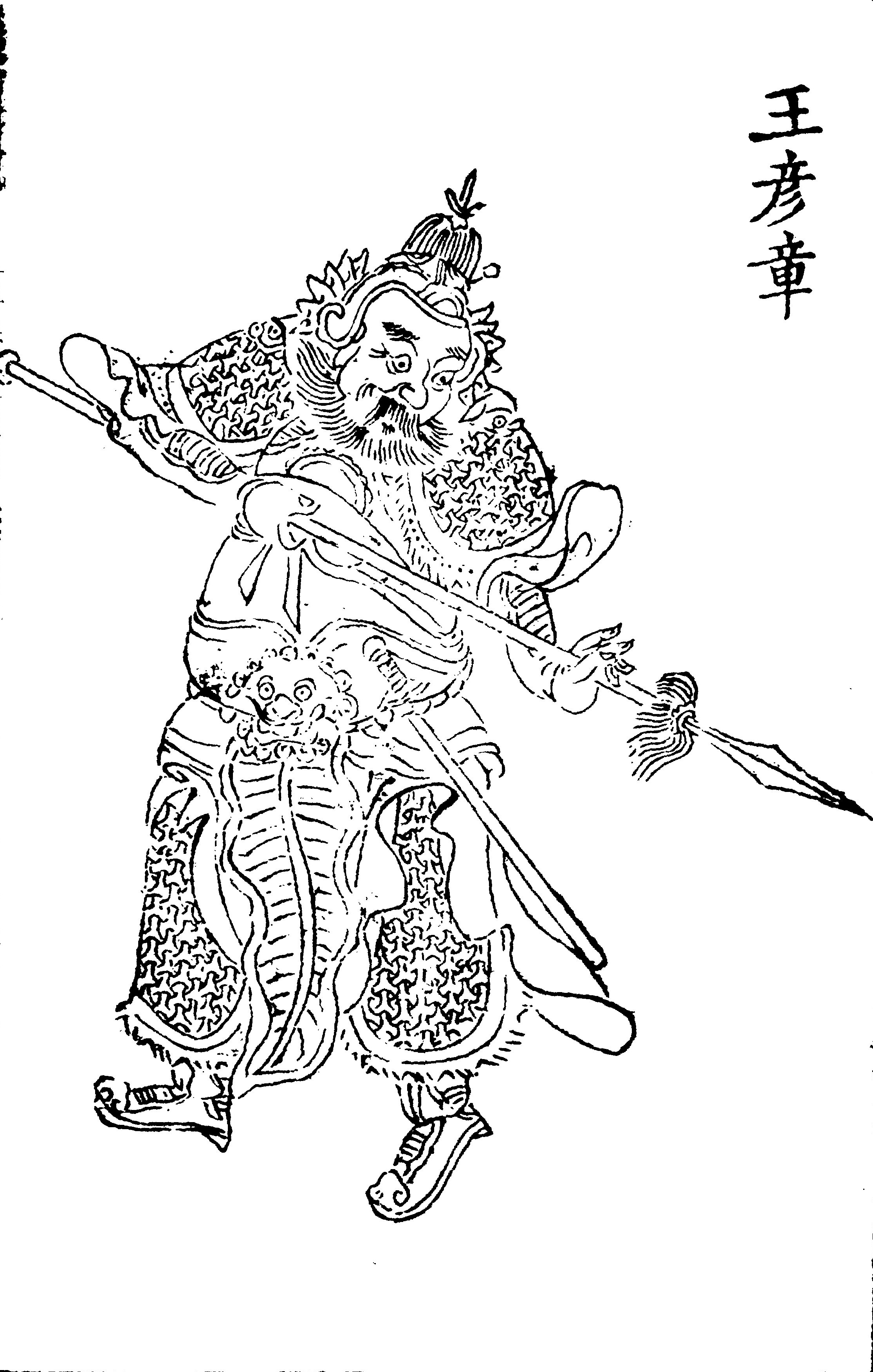
- Born: 0863
- Died: November 15, 0923 (aged 59–60)
- Cause of death: executed
- Other names: Xianming (賢明), Ziming (子明), Wang Tieqiang (王鐵槍)
- Occupation: military general

Wang Yanzhang (王彥章) (863 – November 15, 923), courtesy name Xianming (賢明) or Ziming (子明), nicknamed Wang Tieqiang (王鐵槍, "iron-spear Wang"), was a major general of the Chinese state Later Liang of the Five Dynasties and Ten Kingdoms period. Toward the end of Later Liang's confrontation with its northern archenemy Later Tang, Wang was the only general who was able to achieve any measure of success against Later Tang forces, but then-reigning emperor Zhu Zhen, believing that he was difficult to control, replaced him with Duan Ning, whose overly ambitious counterattack plan allowed Later Tang's Emperor Zhuangzong to slip past him, defeat and capture Wang, and capture the Later Liang capital Daliang. After capture, Wang refused to submit to the Later Tang emperor and was executed.

== Background ==
Wang Yanzhang was born in 863, during the reign of Emperor Yizong of Tang. He was from Shouzhang (壽張, in modern Liaocheng, Shandong). Neither his grandfather Wang Xiu (王秀) nor father Wang Qingzong (王慶宗) served as an official or a general. In his youth, Wang Yanzhang became a soldier under the command of the major warlord Zhu Quanzhong the military governor (Jiedushi) of Xuanwu Circuit (宣武, headquartered in modern Kaifeng, Henan), and became known for his bravery and ferocity. He became well known for his use of a heavy iron spear, and gained the nickname of Wang Tieqiang for the use of the spear.

== Service under Emperor Taizu of Later Liang ==
Because of Wang Yanzhang's abilities, he was promoted gradually in the ranks of Zhu Quanzhong's army and often served under Zhu in Zhu's campaigns. In 909, by which time Zhu had forced Tang's last emperor Emperor Ai (Emperor Yizong's grandson) to yield the throne to him and established Later Liang as its Emperor Taizu, Later Liang forces were attacking Later Liang's western rival Qi as the Qi general Liu Zhijun was attacking the Later Liang vassal Han Xun (韓遜) the military governor of Shuofang Circuit (朔方, headquartered in modern Yinchuan, Ningxia). The Later Liang forces, commanded by the general Kang Huaizhen (康懷貞), fell into a trap that Qi forces laid for them, and it was said that they would have been completely annihilated had not for Wang's efforts in fighting to keep an escape path open.

== Service under Zhu Yougui and Zhu Zhen ==
In 913, by which time Emperor Taizu had been assassinated by and succeeded by his son Zhu Yougui the Prince of Ying, Wang Yanzhang was made the prefect of Pu Prefecture (濮州, in modern Puyang, Henan), but remained in the main Later Liang imperial army as the commander of the forces from Pu Prefecture. In 914, by which time Zhu Yougui had committed suicide and been succeeded by his brother Zhu Youzhen the Prince of Jun (who soon changed his name to Zhu Zhen), Wang was made the prefect of Dan Prefecture (澶州, in modern Anyang, Henan) and created a count.

In 915, Zhu Zhen, believing that Tianxiong Circuit (天雄, headquartered in modern Handan, Hebei) was an overly powerful circuit that had an independent tradition, decided to try to weaken it by diving its six prefectures into two circuits—with three of the prefectures becoming a new Zhaode Circuit (昭德, headquartered in modern Anyang). As part of the operations to divide it, in addition to sending the general He Delun (賀德倫) to be Tianxiong's new military governor and Zhang Yun (張筠) as Zhaode's military governor, to oversee the division, Zhu also sent a large part of the Later Liang imperial army north, commanded by the major general Liu Xun, claiming to be defending Tianxiong against Later Liang's northern rival Jin but instead intending to intimidate the Tianxiong forces. Wang was serving under Liu in this operation and was sent to Tianxiong's capital Wei Prefecture (魏州) with 500 men in advance of Liu's own arrival there. The Tianxiong soldiers, resentful and fearful of the division, soon mutinied and put He Delun under house arrest; they also surrounded Jinbo Pavilion (金波亭), where Wang's troops were stationed at the time, but Wang was able to fight his way out of the city. The Tianxiong mutineers subsequently surrendered the circuit to Jin, and Jin's prince Li Cunxu arrived to take over the circuit, defeating subsequent Later Liang attempts to recapture it. During the campaign, Dan Prefecture fell to Jin forces, and Wang's wife and children were taken captive. The Jin forces initially treated them well and took them to the Jin capital Taiyuan, and sent a secret messenger to Wang, trying to persuade him to turn to the Jin cause. Wang killed the secret messenger and refused to respond; as a result, several years later, Jin had his wife and children executed.

In 916, Wang was promoted to be the defender (防禦使, Fangyushi) of Zheng Prefecture (鄭州, in modern Zhengzhou, Henan), but remained in the Later Liang imperial army. In 917, he was given the title of acting Taifu (太傅).

Around the new year 919, Wang, then under the command of He Gui, participated in a major confrontation between Later Liang and Jin forces at Huliu Slope (胡柳陂, in modern Heze, Shandong). It was said that it was Wang's initial suffering of some losses that led to a chain reaction that caused massive losses (two thirds) for both armies—when Wang was retreating, part of the Jin army misread Wang's movement as a retreat by their own army, and collapsed, although a subsequent Jin counterattack also inflicted great losses on the Later Liang army. It was said that in the aftermaths of the battle, fleeing soldiers from both Wang's army and the Jin army found their way to the Later Liang capital Daliang, causing much panic in the city that the Jin army was approaching, although the panic soon subsided.

In 919, Wang was made the acting military governor of Kuangguo Circuit (匡國, headquartered in modern Xuchang, Henan), but continued to serve as a general in the imperial army. In 920, he was made full military governor and created a marquess. Soon after, he was made the deputy commander of the armies in the north (i.e., the armies defending against Jin) under Dai Siyuan. In spring 921, he was transferred from Kuangguo to Xuanyi Circuit (宣義, headquartered in modern Anyang).

Later in 921, Zhu Zhen's cousin Zhu Youneng (朱友能) the Prince of Hui, who was then the prefect of Chen Prefecture (陳州, in modern Zhoukou, Henan), rebelled and headed for Daliang. Zhu Zhen sent Wang, along with Huo Yanwei and Zhang Hanjie (張漢傑), to intercept Zhu Youneng. They defeated him, who fled back to Chen Prefecture. They then put the city under siege. He surrendered, and Zhu Zhen, while sparing his life, demoted him and put him under arrest.

=== Events of 923 ===
In spring 923, Li Cunxu, then at Wei Prefecture, declared himself emperor of a new Later Tang (as Emperor Zhuangzong), effectively claiming to be the legitimate successor to Tang. Shortly after, he had his general Li Siyuan launch a surprise attack across the Yellow River on Later Liang's Tianping Circuit (天平, headquartered in modern Tai'an, Shandong), capturing it. The fall of Tianping's capital Yun Prefecture (鄆州) left few defenses between it and Daliang, causing great panic at Daliang. Zhu Zhen relieved Dai Siyuan of his command for failing to anticipate the attack, and, at the urging of the senior chancellor Jing Xiang, named Wang Yanzhang to replace Dai, with Duan Ning serving as his deputy.

After being commissioned, Wang immediately attacked the Later Tang-held city of Desheng (德勝, in modern Puyang)—which was divided into two parts by the Yellow River. He destroyed the bridge between the two parts so that the Later Tang forces to the north could not reinforce the southern city, and then captured the southern city and killed thousands of Later Tang soldiers, dealing a big blow to the Later Tang morale. He then prepared to attack Yangliu (楊劉, in modern Liaocheng), the ford on the Yellow River that was allowing the Later Tang forces to the north of the River to maintain communication and supply lines open to Yun Prefecture, in order to trap Li Siyuan at Yun. Both armies tore down the Desheng buildings to use as rafts, and as they headed down the river, they battled intensely on the river. When he arrived at Yangliu, he laid siege to it, nearly capturing it several times, but the city's defenses eventually held under the defense by the Later Tang general Li Zhou (李周). When Later Tang soon built a second fort at Majiakou (馬家口, also in modern Liaocheng) to allow a second passageway to Yun, Wang attacked it but could not defeat the Later Tang emperor, who was defending the fort himself, Wang was forced to withdraw.

It was said that throughout these battles, however, Wang was being undermined inside the Later Liang army itself. He had long resented what he saw as the corrupting influence that Zhu Zhen's brother-in-law Zhao Yan and four brothers/cousins of Zhu Zhen's deceased wife Consort Zhang (including Zhang Hanjie, who was her brother), and had told people, "After I victoriously return, I will kill all the wicked men on the behalf of the people of the empire." His hatred of them eventually was discovered by Zhao and the Zhangs. Further, Duan was jealous of Wang and wanted to be the commander himself, and therefore formed an alliance with Zhao and the Zhangs, and it was said that Wang's military campaign was much hampered by this group of internal enemies. After his forced withdrawal from Majiakou, Zhu Zhen believed the false accusations against Wang and relieved him of his command of the main Later Liang army, instead ordering him to rendezvous with Dong Zhang to attack Ze Prefecture (澤州, in modern Jincheng, Shanxi). Zhu Zhen replaced him with Duan, despite the oppositions of senior officials Jing, Li Zhen, and Zhang Zongshi.

Soon thereafter, Wang was recalled back from the Ze front and instead ordered to attack Yun Prefecture to recapture it, with Zhang Hanjie serving as the monitor of his army, as part of a four-prong counterattack against Later Tang that Duan was envisioning—having Dong attack northwest toward Taiyuan, having Huo attack north toward Zhending (真定, in modern Baoding, Hebei), having Wang attack northeast toward Yun, and having Duan himself attack the Later Tang emperor directly near Desheng. This four-prong plan was revealed to the Later Tang emperor, however, when the Later Liang officer Kang Yanxiao defected to Later Tang. Kang also revealed that the main strength was with Duan, who had by that point crossed the Yellow River and headed toward what he believed to be the Later Tang main army. The Later Tang emperor decided to risk opening up his rear by heading immediately to Yun to rendezvous with Li Siyuan, bypassing the Later Liang main army, and attack Daliang directly.

Just as the Later Liang army was about to put the four-prong plan into effect, the Later Tang emperor arrived at Yun Prefecture and advanced toward Daliang, with Li Siyuan as his forward commander. They encountered and surprised Wang, who was forced to retreat to the poorly-fortified city of Zhongdu (中都, in modern Jining, Shandong). The Later Tang forces quickly breached its defenses, and Wang tried to flee, but as he did, the Later Tang general Xia Luqi (夏魯奇), who had served in the Later Liang army before with Wang, recognized him and speared him. Wang was seriously injured and captured, along with Zhang and most of his army.

The Later Tang emperor, impressed with Wang, initially wanted to spare his life and get him to submit. Wang repeatedly refused, however, stating that he was a faithful Later Liang subject who would never serve Later Tang. When the Later Tang emperor sent Li Siyuan to also try to persuade him, he insulted Li Siyuan by referring to Li Siyuan by nickname. When the Later Tang forces, after a short rest, was getting ready to march on Daliang, Wang still tried to prevent its advance by falsely stating to the Later Tang emperor that Duan's army (which in reality was trapped north of the Yellow River and would not be able to come to Daliang's aid) was on its way, the Later Tang emperor executed him. Shortly after, the Later Tang forces captured Daliang; Zhu Zhen committed suicide, and Later Liang was at its end.

== Notes and references ==
- History of the Five Dynasties, vol. 21.
- New History of the Five Dynasties, vol. 32.
- Zizhi Tongjian, vols. 267, 269, 270, 271, 272.
