= Empress Liu (Li Cunxu's wife) =

Empress Liu (劉皇后, personal name unknown (Note: Her Chinese Wikipedia article and a number of modern sources, including, for example, the modern historian Bo Yang, give her name as Liu Yuniang (劉玉娘), but the name was not corroborated by traditional sources.)) (died 926), formally Empress Shenminjing (神閔敬皇后, "the unassuming, suffering, and alert empress"), was the second wife and only empress of Emperor Zhuangzong of Later Tang (Li Cunxu), the founding emperor of the Chinese Five Dynasties and Ten Kingdoms period Later Tang state. In traditional histories, she was regarded as a hoarder of wealth who, during her husband's reign, became extremely powerful, with her own orders carrying the same weight as his own. It was the killing of the major general Guo Chongtao by at her order in 926 that created a cascade of military rebellions that led to Emperor Zhuangzong's downfall and death; she was subsequently killed by his adoptive brother and successor Li Siyuan (Emperor Mingzong).

== Background ==
The future Empress Liu was from Cheng'an (成安, in modern Handan, Hebei). Her father, whose name is lost to history, was described to be a capable physician who had a yellow beard, and who referred to himself as Hermit Liu (劉山人). It is not known exactly when she was born, but she was four or five when, during a raid that Li Cunxu's father Li Keyong the Prince of Jin, then a vassal of the Tang dynasty, conducted on Wei Prefecture (魏州), which Cheng'an belonged to, she was captured by Li Keyong's officer Yuan Jianfeng (袁建豐). (As the records of Li Keyong's campaigns only indicated one instance in which he personally raided Wei Prefecture—in 897—it would appear that that was the likely time when Lady Liu was taken, which would make her born in 892 or 893.) She was taken into the Jin palace at Taiyuan, where Li Keyong's favorite concubine Lady Cao (Li Cunxu's mother) took her and taught her how to play the Sheng, as well as singing and dancing. After she grew up, she became very beautiful, and Li Cunxu was attracted to her.

== During Li Cunxu's reign as Prince of Jin ==
Sometime after Li Cunxu became the Prince of Jin after Li Keyong's death in 908, there was an occasion when Lady Dowager Cao visited his palace for a feast. At the feast, Lady Dowager Cao had Lady Liu play the Sheng, dance, and sing. After the feast, Lady Dowager Cao left Lady Liu at Li Cunxu's palace, and she thereafter became his concubine. She received the title of Lady of Wei (魏國夫人) and was, among his consorts, only ranked lower than his wife Lady Han the Lady of Wei (衛國夫人, note different character than Lady Liu's title) and first-ranked concubine Lady Yi the Lady of Yan. Initially, however, another concubine of his, Lady Hou, whom he took as a concubine in 908 after killing her husband Fu Daozhao (符道昭), a general for Jin's archrival Later Liang, in battle, was his favorite concubine, and he took Lady Hou on his campaigns. Later, however, after Lady Liu gave birth to his oldest son Li Jiji, Li Cunxu believed that Li Jiji was very much like himself and favored both him and Lady Liu greatly. Subsequently, Lady Liu became the one who accompanied him on campaigns. She was said to be intelligent and capable of anticipating Li Cunxu's wishes, such that few other consorts were able to see him.

After Li Cunxu conquered Wei Prefecture and the surrounding region in 915, there was an occasion, probably in 917, when Lady Liu's father Hermit Liu, after hearing that his daughter had become an honored concubine of the Prince of Jin, went to his Wei Prefecture palace to try to see her. Li Cunxu, after receiving report of this, summoned Yuan Jianfeng, who confirmed that Hermit Liu was Lady Liu's father. However, Lady Liu had been falsely claiming a much more honored heritage in her struggle for favor against the other consorts, and was angry and ashamed that her father's appearance exposed her account as deceitful. She publicly proclaimed that Hermit Liu was a fraud—that when she was captured, her father had died in battle and that she had mourned him before leaving. She had Hermit Liu whipped and expelled.

== During Li Cunxu's reign as Emperor of Later Tang ==
In 923, Li Cunxu declared himself the emperor of a newly restored Tang dynasty—which traditionally became known as Later Tang (as its Emperor Zhuangzong)—at Xingtang (興唐, i.e., Wei Prefecture). At that time, despite his years of military success against Later Liang, the Later Liang emperor Zhu Zhen was planning a major counterattack against him, commanded by the general Duan Ning. Further, the Later Tang territory was then facing a famine as well as the potential threat of Khitan incursions. After a successful surprise attack that his general and adoptive brother Li Siyuan carried out that captured Yun Prefecture (鄆州, in modern Tai'an, Shandong), Li Cunxu decided to head south, rendezvous with Li Siyuan, and make a final attack against Later Liang. Believing that if he failed, Later Tang would fall entirely, he sent Lady Liu and Li Jiji back to Xingtang, telling them, "Whether this endeavor is successful or not depends on this one gamble. If we fail, you should gather our household at the Wei palace and set fire to it!" He subsequently launched a surprise attack on the Later Liang capital Daliang, capturing it. Zhu Zhen committed suicide, ending Later Liang and allowing Later Tang to take over the remaining Later Liang territory.

Emperor Zhuangzong subsequently moved the capital to Luoyang. He wanted to create Lady Liu empress, but was hesitant because Lady Han was his wife and also because his mother Lady Dowager Cao (whom he had, by this point, honored as empress dowager) disliked Lady Liu. His chief of staff Guo Chongtao also opposed elevating Lady Liu. By 924, however, Guo, himself facing false accusations from Emperor Zhuangzong's favored eunuchs and performers, decided that an alliance with Lady Liu would allow him to be continued to be trusted by the emperor, and so submitted a petition with other officials recommending Lady Liu as empress. Shortly after, Emperor Zhuangzong created her empress. It was said that she spent her energy on amassing material wealth, and that after she became empress, the tributes to the emperor were divided into two halves; one half went to the emperor and one half went to her. As her only expenses were the copying of Buddhist sutras and stipends for Buddhist monks, her wealth became considerable. Further, her orders (as well as Empress Dowager Cao's orders, until the empress dowager's death in 925) were treated by the officials as equivalent in authoritativeness as the emperor's edicts. She also honored the wealthy general Zhang Quanyi as her father, and was able to coax him into giving many material gifts to her.

In 925, the Later Tang territory was suffering another serious famine, such that even the family members of Emperor Zhuangzong's elite Yinqiang (銀槍) guard troops were starving to death. Despite this, Empress Liu refused to release her wealth for famine relief. Meanwhile, though, Later Tang forces under the command of Li Jiji and Guo (with Li Jiji in titular command but with Guo actually in charge of the operations) attacked and conquered Later Tang's southwestern neighbor Former Shu. After Former Shu fell, however, Empress Liu came to believe that Guo was hoarding the Former Shu wealth that the army pillaged and not giving them to her and the emperor; she also became fearful that Guo might kill her son Li Jiji and take over the Shu region, as she disbelieved Guo's articulated reasons for not quickly returning from Shu—that the Shu region was still full of rebels that needed to be pacified. She tried to persuade Emperor Zhuangzong to have Guo executed, but Emperor Zhuangzong refused. Despite this refusal, in late 925, she herself issued an order to Li Jiji, ordering him to kill Guo. When he received the order in spring 926, he initially hesitated but then had Guo assassinated.

While Emperor Zhuangzong did not initially approve of Guo's death, once it occurred, he issued an edict denouncing Guo and killing his sons. He further killed Guo's political allies Zhu Youqian and his own brother Li Cun'ai (李存乂) the Prince of Mu. This led the soldiers throughout the realm to become discontented and terrified. The soldiers at Xingtang shortly after mutinied under the leadership of the officer Huangfu Hui (皇甫暉), and the mutineers became increasing in strength and numbers such that despite an attack by the major general Li Shaorong, the defenses held. The imperial officials recommended sending the more experienced Li Siyuan instead, and Emperor Zhuangzong, after some hesitation, sent Li Siyuan. Once Li Siyuan arrived at Xingtang, however, his own soldiers mutinied and forced him and his deputy commander, Li Shaozhen, into joining the mutiny. Li Siyuan initially wanted to calm the mutineers and then resubmit to Emperor Zhuangzong, but after Li Shaorong accused him of willingly joined the rebellion, he turned against Emperor Zhuangzong and decided to attack south. Both he and Emperor Zhuangzong led troops to try to first reach Daliang to serve as an anchoring point, but Li Siyuan reached Daliang first and was welcomed by the general Kong Xun there. Emperor Zhuangzong was forced to return to Luoyang, with the army increasingly against him by that point. Shortly after Emperor Zhuangzong's return to Luoyang, the officer Guo Congqian (郭從謙), who had previously honored Guo Chongtao as an uncle, rose in rebellion. Emperor Zhuangzong was wounded in battle, but it was said that Empress Liu refused to go see him to attend to him, but instead was gathering treasures, preparing to flee. He died shortly after.

== Death ==
Empress Liu and her brother-in-law (Emperor Zhuangzong's younger brother) Li Cunwo (李存渥) gathered up the treasures and fled north, heading for the old capital Taiyuan, apparently believing that they could find refuge there and wait for Li Jiji's return from the Shu lands. On the way, they engaged in sexual relations. Once they reached Taiyuan, however, the general Li Yanchao (李彥超), who had shortly before seized control of the city from Zhang Xian (張憲), the official that Emperor Zhuangzong had put in charge of defending Taiyuan, refused to allow Li Cunwo into the city, and Li Cunwo was subsequently killed by his own guards. Empress Liu took tonsure and became a Buddhist nun. Shortly after, though, after Li Siyuan entered Luoyang and claimed the title of regent, he sent emissaries to Taiyuan and ordered that she be killed. Shortly after, Li Siyuan took the throne (as Emperor Mingzong). Subsequently, after Emperor Mingzong's son-in-law Shi Jingtang overthrew Emperor Mingzong's adoptive son and successor Li Congke and established Later Jin, he honored Empress Liu posthumously.

== Notes ==
Regnal titles
Preceded by Consort Han (as wife of Prince of Jin)	Empress of Later Tang; 924–926	Succeeded by Empress Cao
Preceded by Consort Han (as wife of Prince of Jin)	Empress of China (most regions); 924–926	Succeeded by Empress Cao
Preceded by Empress Liu of Qi	Empress of China (Baoji region); 924–926	Succeeded by Empress Cao
Preceded by Empress Jin Feishan of Former Shu	Empress of China (Southwest); 925–926	Succeeded by Empress Cao
