= Empress Zhu =

Empress Zhu may refer to:

- Empress Zhu (Eastern Wu) (died 265), wife of the Eastern Wu emperor Sun Xiu during the Three Kingdoms period
- Zhu Manyue (547–586), empress of the Chinese/Xianbei empire Northern Zhou
- Empress Zhu (Liu Shouguang's wife) (died 914), wife of Liu Shouguang of the Chinese Five Dynasties and Ten Kingdoms state Yan
- Empress Zhu (Song dynasty) (1102–1127), wife of Emperor Qinzong of Song
