= Huo Yanwei =

Chinese general

Huo Yanwei (Chinese: 霍彥威) (872–928), known as Li Shaozhen (李紹真) from 924 to 926, courtesy name Zizhong (子重), formally Duke Zhongwu of Jin (晉忠武公), was a general of the Chinese Five Dynasties and Ten Kingdoms period Later Liang and Later Tang states.

== Background ==
Huo Yanwei was born in 872, during the reign of Emperor Yizong of Tang. He was from Quzhou (曲周, in modern Handan, Hebei), but his birth name is lost to history. When he was 13 (i.e., in 885), he was either captured by or taken in by Huo Cun (霍存), then a general under the major warlord Zhu Quanzhong the military governor (Jiedushi) of Xuanwu Circuit (宣武, headquartered in modern Kaifeng, Henan), and who was also from Quzhou. He became a soldier under Huo Cun, and Huo Cun, favoring him for his good disposition and good looks, adopted him as a son.

Even before Huo Yanwei had his guan li (coming of age ceremony at or before age 19), he became known to Zhu Quanzhong, and Zhu Quanzhong made Huo Yanwei a member of his guard corps. During Zhu Quanzhong's subsequent battles, Huo had accomplishments and therefore was gradually promoted in the ranks. (His father Huo Cun would die in battle against Zhu Quanzhong's enemies Shi Pu the military governor of Ganhua Circuit (感化, headquartered in modern Xuzhou, Jiangsu) and Zhu Jin the military governor of Taining Circuit (泰寧, headquartered in modern Jining, Shandong) in 893, when Huo Yanwei was 21.) During this early stage of Huo Yanwei's career — either while serving under his father Huo Cun or under Zhu Quanzhong — Huo Yanwei suffered an arrow wound in one of his eyes while in battle and became blind in that eye.

== During Later Liang ==
In 908, by which time Zhu Quanzhong had seized the Tang throne, ending Tang and starting Later Liang as its Emperor Taizu, Huo Yanwei was serving as a commander of the police for the eastern capital Kaifeng and a commander of the emperor's guards. That year, he was made one of the two commanders of the elite Longxiang Army (龍驤軍). In 909, he was made one of the commanders of Tianwu Army (天武軍), and then as a grand general of the guards.

In 912, Emperor Taizu's son Zhu Yougui the Prince of Ying assassinated Emperor Taizu and took the throne himself. Shortly after, 3,000 Longxiang army soldiers stationed at Huai Prefecture (懷州, in modern Luoyang, Henan) mutinied under the officer Liu Chongyu (劉重遇). Zhu Yougui sent Huo and Du Yanqiu against the Longxiang mutineers. Huo and Du defeated the mutineers and captured and executed Liu.

In 913, another son of Emperor Taizu's, Zhu Youzhen the Prince of Jun, rose against Zhu Yougui along with Emperor Taizu's nephew Yuan Xiangxian, and Zhu Yougui committed suicide, allowing Zhu Youzhen (who changed his name to Zhu Zhen shortly after) to take the throne. Huo was cooperating with Yuan in the plot, and shortly after was made the prefect of Ming Prefecture (洺州, in modern Handan, Hebei), and later the acting military governor of Heyang Circuit (河陽, headquartered in modern Jiaozuo, Henan).

In 914, Li Jihui the military governor of Jingnan Circuit (靜難, headquartered in modern Xianyang, Shaanxi), which was then part of one of Later Liang's rival states, Qi, was poisoned to death by his son Li Yanlu, who took control of the circuit. In 915, Li Jihui's adoptive son Li Baoheng (李保衡) killed Li Yanlu and surrendered Jingnan's two prefectures (its capital Bin Prefecture and Ning Prefecture (寧州, in modern Qingyang, Gansu)) to Later Liang. Zhu Zhen made Huo the military governor of Jingnan. Qi's prince Li Maozhen (Li Jihui's adoptive father) subsequently sent the general Liu Zhijun to put Bin Prefecture under siege, and after half a year, after Liu was unable to capture it and after Qi suffered large losses in an unrelated attack by Former Shu — costing Qi its Tianxiong Circuit (天雄, headquartered in modern Tianshui, Gansu) and causing Liu's family, who lived at Tianxiong's capital Qin Prefecture (秦州), to become captives of Former Shu — Liu withdrew (and subsequently defected to Former Shu, to protect his family members). Huo was therefore able to hold Jingnan. (Huo's biographies in the History of the Five Dynasties and the New History of the Five Dynasties, however, attributed this to Huo's releasing Qi soldiers that he captured to gain Qi's goodwill.)

Huo was later made the military governor of Xuanyi Circuit (宣義, headquartered in modern Anyang, Henan) and then Tianping Circuit (天平, headquartered in modern Tai'an, Shandong). He later became the commander of all Later Liang forces on its northern border with its archrival Jin. However, after a number of losses in battles against Jin, he was demoted to be the acting military governor of Zhenguo Circuit (鎮國, headquartered in modern Sanmenxia, Henan). In 921, when Zhu Zhen's cousin Zhu Youneng (朱友能) the Prince of Hui rebelled against Zhu Zhen at Chen Prefecture (陳州, in modern Zhoukou, Henan), Zhu Zhen sent Huo, as well as Wang Yanzhang and Zhang Hanjie (張漢傑), against Zhu Youneng. They quickly defeated Zhu Youneng and forced him to return to Chen, where they put him under siege and forced him to surrender.

In 923 — shortly after Jin's prince Li Cunxu declared himself emperor of a new Later Tang (as Emperor Zhuangzong) — the new Later Liang commander of the army against Later Tang, Duan Ning, made a plan for a four-prong assault on Later Tang. As part of Duan's plan, Huo was supposed to head toward Zhen Prefecture (鎮州, in modern Shijiazhuang, Hebei). However, before Duan could actually launch the attack, Emperor Zhuangzong crossed the Yellow River, bypassing Duan's main army (which Duan had intended to command to confront him), and headed directly for Daliang (i.e., Kaifeng), which Zhu Zhen had made capital (after Emperor Taizu and Zhu Yougui had both had their capital at Luoyang), which was defenseless since Duan had taken all the available troops. Zhu Zhen, facing defeat, committed suicide, ending Later Liang.

== During Later Tang ==
=== During Emperor Zhuangzong's reign ===
==== Early in Emperor Zhuangzong's reign ====
Emperor Zhuangzong entered Daliang and announced a general pardon for Later Liang subjects. Huo Yanwei was among the first Later Liang local governors to head to Daliang to show submission to him, arriving only after Yuan Xiangxian. Emperor Zhuangzong held a feast for the Later Liang generals who submitted to him, and at the feast, praised his adoptive brother Li Siyuan, stating to Li Siyuan:

The guests at this feast were all our enemies as of last year. Now we get to feast with them, because of your accomplishment as my forward commander.

Upon hearing these words, Huo and the other former Later Liang generals, worried that Emperor Zhuangzong still bore grudges, bowed down and begged forgiveness. Emperor Zhuangzong pointed out that that was all in the past, and awarded them with clothes and money, before sending them back to their circuits.

In 924, when Khitan forces made an incursion into Later Tang territory and attacked You Prefecture (幽州, in modern Beijing), Emperor Zhuangzong sent Li Siyuan north to relieve You Prefecture and to repel the attack, with Huo serving as his deputy. It was said that because of this opportunity to serve under Li Siyuan, and because Li Siyuan liked Huo's personality, they became friends. Shortly after, Emperor Zhuangzong bestowed on Huo the imperial surname of Li and gave him a new name of Shaozhen. Later in the year, after he served under Li Siyuan in quelling a mutiny at Lu Prefecture (潞州, in modern Changzhi, Shanxi), he was made the military governor of Wuning Circuit (武寧, headquartered in modern Xuzhou, Jiangsu).

==== Role in Emperor Zhuangzong's defeat ====
In 926, after Emperor Zhuangzong killed the major general Guo Chongtao, the army was much perturbed, and mutinies occurred in many places throughout the realm. One of the mutinies was led by the officer Zhao Tai (趙太) at Xing Prefecture (邢州, in modern Xingtai, Hebei). Emperor Zhuangzong sent Li Shaozhen against the Xing rebels, and he quickly defeated them, capturing Zhao. He then took Zhao and the other rebels, joined forces with Li Siyuan (who was then attacking rebels at Yedu), and executed Zhao and the other Xing rebels in the presence of the Wei rebels, to try to shake their resolve. Nevertheless, the Yedu rebels did not crumble, and shortly after, Li Siyuan's own troops mutinied and forced him (and Li Shaozhen) to join the Yedu rebels in the city. The Yedu rebels' leader, Zhao Zaili (趙在禮), however, allowed Li Siyuan and Li Shaozhen to leave the city, where 5,000 soldiers from Zhen Prefecture who had previously been under Li Siyuan's and Li Shaozhen's command joined them.

Li Siyuan pondered his next step. He considered returning to Chengde Circuit (成德, headquartered at Zhen Prefecture), which he was the military governor of, and then submitting a report to Emperor Zhuangzong begging forgiveness for the defeat. Li Shaozhen and Li Siyuan's strategist An Chonghui advised against it — pointing out that another general, Li Shaorong, who had also retreated in light of Li Siyuan's army's mutiny, would then use this opportunity to accuse Li Siyuan of rebelling himself. Rather, they advised heading south toward Luoyang (which Emperor Zhuangzong had made capital) to see if he could explain the situation personally to Emperor Zhuangzong. Li Siyuan accepted their suggestion. Meanwhile, the eunuch monitor of the Wuning army at Wuning's capital Xu Prefecture (徐州), believing that Li Siyuan and Li Shaozhen had both rebelled, wanted to slaughter Li Shaozhen's family and close associates, but the acting military governor Chunyu Yan (淳于晏) acted first, killing the eunuch monitor, to avoid this.

Shortly after, Emperor Zhuangzong was killed in a mutiny at Luoyang itself. Li Siyuan thereafter arrived at Luoyang and took control of the city, initially only claiming the title of regent. Part of the orders he issued was to look for and welcome the imperial princes back to the palace. Two of Emperor Zhuangzong's biological brothers, Li Cunque (李存確) the Prince of Tong and Li Cunji (李存紀) the Prince of Ya, were then hiding among the common people. Li Shaozhen and An located them, but instead of taking them back to the palace as Li Siyuan had instructed, they opined that Li Siyuan should next take the throne and that these imperial princes' presence would interfere with that plan, so they killed Li Cunque and Li Cunji without approval from Li Siyuan.

Meanwhile, while the situation was still calming down in Luoyang, Li Shaozhen was in charge of many of the key decisions. Despising Duan Ning (whose name Emperor Zhuangzong had changed to Li Shaoqin) and another former Later Liang general, Li Shaochong (李紹沖, né Wen Tao (溫韜)), he arrested Li Shaoqin and Li Shaochong, intending to put them to death. An, however, questioned him on it, pointing out that Li Shaoqin's and Li Shaochong's crimes occurred during Later Liang and that, in effect, Li Shaozhen was carrying out personal vendettas. Li Shaoqin and Li Shaochong were subsequently stripped of their imperially-bestowed names, but (at that point) allowed to live.

=== During Emperor Mingzong's reign ===
Shortly after, Li Siyuan was finally resolved to take the throne (after first repelling the forces of Emperor Zhuangzong's son Li Jiji the Prince of Wei, forcing Li Jiji to commit suicide). Li Shaozhen and another former Later Liang official that he recommended, Kong Xun, believed that Tang's Mandate of Heaven (which Emperor Zhuangzong claimed to inherit) has already ended and that Li Siyuan should start a new dynasty of his own, but other officials and Li Siyuan himself, pointing out that he was adopted into the family of Emperor Zhuangzong's grandfather Li Guochang and father Li Keyong and believing that he could legitimately claim succession from Emperor Zhuangzong, rejected the idea. Li Siyuan subsequently claimed the Later Tang throne (as Emperor Mingzong). Shortly after, a number of generals, including Li Shaozhen, who had been bestowed imperial clan names by Emperor Zhuangzong, requested to have their original names restored, and Emperor Mingzong granted the request, so Li Shaozhen again assumed the name Huo Yanwei.

Huo was thereafter made the military governor of Tianping. However, at that time, Emperor Mingzong was faced with a mutiny at Pinglu Circuit (平盧, headquartered in modern Weifang, Shandong), where, late in Emperor Zhuangzong's reign, the officer Wang Gongyan (王公儼) had killed the eunuch monitor Yang Xiwang (楊希望) and seized control of the circuit. Wang subsequently refused to let the military governor Fu Xi (符習), who had been away on a campaign against another mutiny, to return to Pinglu, and refused to yield control of the circuit to the imperial government. Emperor Mingzong commissioned Wang as the prefect of Deng Prefecture (登州, in modern Yantai, Shandong), but Wang refused to report there. Emperor Mingzong thereafter moved Huo to Pinglu as its military governor, and Wang, fearing Huo's reputation, left Pinglu's capital Qing Prefecture (青州) to head for Deng. Huo ambushed him and killed him, along with his coconspirators.

Huo died in late 928, while still serving as the military governor of Pinglu. Emperor Mingzong mourned him, posthumously created him the Duke of Jin, and gave him the posthumous name of Zhongwu ("faithful and martial"). Later, during the reign of Emperor Taizu of Song, when the Song emperor built a temple dedicated to Later Tang's Emperor Mingzong, Huo was one of the officials enshrined at Emperor Mingzong's temple.

== Notes and references ==
- History of the Five Dynasties, vol. 64.
- New History of the Five Dynasties, vol. 46.
- Zizhi Tongjian, vols. 268, 269, 271, 272, 273, 274, 275, 276.
