= Li Jiji =

Later Tang prince

Li Jiji (李繼岌) (died 28 May 926), formally the Prince of Wei (魏王), nickname Hege (和哥), was an imperial prince of the Chinese Five Dynasties and Ten Kingdoms period state Later Tang. He was the oldest son of Emperor Zhuangzong of Later Tang (Li Cunxu), the founder of the Later Tang dynasty, and was commonly regarded at the time to be Emperor Zhuangzong's heir apparent. As such, he served as the titular commander of Later Tang's campaign to destroy its neighbor Former Shu, albeit with the major general Guo Chongtao in effective control. After Later Tang conquered Former Shu, however, under the command of his mother Empress Liu, Li Jiji killed Guo, leading to a chain reaction of mutinies that doomed Later Tang.

== During Jin ==
It is not known for certain when Li Jiji was born. However, it is known that he was the oldest son of Li Cunxu, then the Prince of Jin. His birth date could further be confined by the historical assertion that his mother Lady Liu, who was Li Cunxu's concubine, was not his favorite initially — a Lady Hou, who had previously been the wife of Fu Daozhao (符道昭), a general of Jin's archrival Later Liang, whom he captured in a battle in 908 shortly after his succession (after the death of Li Jiji's grandfather Li Keyong), was — and it was not until Lady Liu gave birth to Li Jiji, whom Li Cunxu believed resembled him greatly, that she gained favor and became his favorite.

The first historical reference to Li Jiji was in 917 (although it is unclear whether the incident actually happened in 917 itself), when there was a time when Li Cunxu had him dance in the honor of the eunuch official Zhang Chengye, and Zhang gave him a gift to show thanks — and yet displeased Li Cunxu, who considered the gift as being too small in amount. (The dispute was resolved when Li Cunxu realized, at the urging of his mother (Li Jiji's grandmother) Lady Dowager Cao of Zhang's faithfulness by not expanding from the royal treasury.) In 922, when Li Cunxu met with a key ally, Wang Du the military governor of Yiwu Circuit (義武, headquartered in modern Baoding, Hebei), Wang proposed to give his daughter in marriage to Li Jiji, and Li Cunxu agreed. (Li Jiji himself was said to be "emasculated from an illness" in childhood and never had a son.)

== During Later Tang ==
=== During Emperor Zhuangzong's reign as emperor ===
In 923, Li Cunxu, considering himself the legitimate successor to the Tang dynasty, declared himself emperor of a new Later Tang (as its Emperor Zhuangzong). For the time being, he had his capital at Xingtang (興唐, in modern Handan, Hebei), naming it the eastern capital, but also designated the old Jin capital Taiyuan as western capital and Zhending (真定, in modern Shijiazhuang, Hebei) as northern capital, giving Li Jiji the titles of the defender of Zhending and the director of Xingsheng Palace (興聖宮). However, Li Jiji appeared to remain with Emperor Zhuangzong and his army at that point and did not head to Zhending.

Later in the year, Emperor Zhuangzong was preparing a surprise attack against Later Liang's capital Daliang. Believing that success would mean total victory but that failure would mean total defeat (as the surprise attack was a desperate measure given that Later Tang was having difficulty supplying its army), he sent Lady Liu and Li Jiji back to Xingtang, and bade farewell to them, informing them that if he failed, they should gather all the family members at the Xingtang palace and commit suicide by setting fire to it. Shortly after, he defeated the Later Liang army under Wang Yanzhang and Zhang Hanjie (張漢傑), and then quickly descended on Daliang. Caught by surprise, the Later Liang emperor Zhu Zhen committed suicide, ending Later Liang. Later Liang territory came under Later Tang control, and shortly after, one of Later Liang's most senior officials, Zhang Quanyi, arrived at Daliang to pay homage to Emperor Zhuangzong. Emperor Zhuangzong, in order to show respect to Zhang, had both Li Jiji and his uncle (Emperor Zhuangzong's brother) Li Cunji (李存紀) treat Zhang with the ceremony due an older brother — indicating that, by that point, Emperor Zhuangzong must have had Li Jiji brought to Daliang. Shortly after, Emperor Zhuangzong made Li Jiji the defender of Xingtang, and gave him the honorary chancellor designation of Tong Zhongshu Menxia Pingzhangshi (同中書門下平章事), although it was not clear whether Li Jiji actually returned to Xingtang. Later that year, he also had Li Jiji treat another major general, Zhu Youqian (whom he granted a new name of Li Jilin), as an older brother.

In 924, Emperor Zhuangzong had Li Jiji and another uncle, Li Cunwo (李存渥), go to Taiyuan to welcome Lady Cao (whom he had honored as empress dowager) and Li Keyong's wife Consort Dowager Liu to Luoyang, which he had made capital by this point. (They were able to bring Empress Dowager Cao to Luoyang, but Consort Dowager Liu refused to head for Luoyang and remained at Taiyuan instead.) Later in the year, Li Jiji took the command of the imperial guards, replacing Zhang. In 925, after his mother Lady Liu was created empress, Li Jiji was created the Prince of Wei.

In winter 925, Emperor Zhuangzong was planning a campaign to destroy Later Tang's southwestern neighbor Former Shu. At the suggestion of his chief of staff Guo Chongtao, who believed that this would be a chance for Li Jiji to establish his reputation among the generals, he named Li Jiji the overall commander of the operations, but made Guo Li Jiji's deputy, in actual command. The Later Tang army quickly scored victory after victory against the Former Shu army, and, before the year was over, the Former Shu general Wang Zongbi had forced the Former Shu emperor Wang Zongyan into surrendering to the Later Tang army. To try to ingratiate Li Jiji and Guo into recommending him to serve as the military governor of Xichuan Circuit (西川, headquartered at Former Shu's capital Chengdu), he had his son Wang Chengban (王承班) present beautiful women and treasures from Wang Yan's palace to Li Jiji and Guo. Li Jiji, however, responded, "These things now all belong to my house. How is it that you are 'offering' them?" He kept the gifts and sent Wang Chengban back. When Li Jiji arrived at Chengdu, Wang Yan formally surrendered to him, ending Former Shu.

Because Guo had been in actual command of the operations, throughout the entire campaign, the generals and officials who had requests of him were trying to get audiences with him, while these generals and officials paid homage to Li Jiji in the morning. This caused Li Jiji's attendants, headed by the eunuch Li Congxi (李從襲), to be displeased. The situation compounded itself once Guo and Li Jiji set up headquarters in Chengdu to handle the aftermaths of taking over Former Shu — as Former Shu officials were all trying to secure better treatment by sending gifts and bribes to Guo and Guo's son Guo Tinghui (郭廷誨), while Li Jiji received largely decorative items not worth much — items such as saddles, screen hangers, spittles, and dusters, further angering Li Congxi and the other attendants. Further, Wang Zongbi, unable to get Guo to commit to recommending him as the military governor of Xichuan, decided to put pressure on Guo by leading a group of Former Shu officials to meet with Li Jiji, requesting that Guo be made the military governor of Xichuan, leading Li Jiji to believe that Guo wanted to take over Former Shu lands himself. To try to show his own good faith, Guo, after receiving permission from Li Jiji, soon had Wang Zongbi and his allies Wang Zongxun (王宗勳) and Wang Zongwo (王宗渥) executed, but that did not completely lift the suspicion that Li Jiji had for him. Li Jiji, meanwhile, also took the initiative to execute the Former Shu general Wang Chengxiu (王承休) and Wang Chengxiu's deputy Wang Zongrui (王宗汭) himself, believing that Wang Chengxiu and Wang Zongrui were responsible for unnecessary loss of life.

Meanwhile, Emperor Zhuangzong was repeatedly issuing orders that Li Jiji and Guo return to Luoyang with the army. However, at that times, there were groups of bandits that rose and occupied secure positions in the mountains in light of Former Shu's destruction. Guo feared that once the Later Tang army withdrew that its control over the Former Shu lands would be endangered, and therefore sent the generals Ren Huan and Zhang Yun (張筠) to try to wipe out these bandits, thus delaying the withdrawal. This instead led to suspicions, both among Li Jiji's attendants and in Emperor Zhuangzong's mind (as Emperor Zhuangzong was suspecting that Guo was holding back treasures gained from Former Shu's destruction and not submitting them to the emperor) that Guo was intending a rebellion. Emperor Zhuangzong decided to send the eunuch Ma Yangui (馬彥珪) to Chengdu to observe the situation, giving him the instruction that if he believed that Guo was intending to take over the Former Shu lands himself, that he should meet with Li Jiji and act against Guo. Ma, however, after receiving these instructions, met with Empress Liu, who believed in rumors of Guo's plan to rebel. She tried to persuade Emperor Zhuangzong to issue an edict for Guo's death, but Emperor Zhuangzong refused. She instead decided to issue an order in her own name, ordering Li Jiji to kill Guo.

In spring 926, Ma arrived in Chengdu. By that point, Li Jiji and Guo were making final preparations to depart Chengdu, when Ma delivered to Li Jiji Empress Liu's orders to kill Guo. Li Jiji hesitated, believing that it would be wrong to execute the commander of the army, particularly without an imperial edict. However, Li Congxi and the others argued to him that if the news leaked, all of them would be in danger. Li Jiji reluctantly agreed. He summoned Guo, ostensibly for a meeting, and when Guo arrived, had his guard Li Huan (李環) kill Guo with a hammer. Guo's sons Guo Tinghui and Guo Tingxin (郭廷信) were also killed. After Guo's death, Li Jiji departed Chengdu with the army.

Guo's death and the death of Li Jilin (whom Emperor Zhuangzong subsequently killed as he suspected Li Jilin to be an ally of Guo's), which Emperor Zhuangzong later tried to justify in an edict, caused all kinds of rumors to come alive among the ranks of the imperial troops not involved in the Former Shu campaign — with rumors eventually vividly stating falsely that Guo had killed Li Jiji and was declaring independence at Chengdu, and that Empress Liu, blaming Emperor Zhuangzong for Li Jiji's death, had assassinated Emperor Zhuangzong. This spawned a mutiny at Xingtang, and the soldiers forced the officer Zhao Zaili (趙在禮) into commanding the mutiny. Soon, when Emperor Zhuangzong sent the major general Li Siyuan (an adoptive brother of Emperor Zhuangzong's) to combat the mutiny, Li Siyuan's army also mutinied and forced him to join the mutiny. With the situation getting desperate, Emperor Zhuangzong tried to order Li Jiji to head for Luoyang as quickly as possible. However, Li Jiji himself had to combat a mutiny — as the general Li Shaochen, serving under him, rebelled on the way, forcing him to stop at Li Prefecture (利州, in modern Guangyuan, Sichuan) and send Ren to defeat Li Shaochen, before he could continue his progress back to Luoyang, as the situation in and near Luoyang worsened for Emperor Zhuangzong. In summer 926, Emperor Zhuangzong, as he was preparing to himself lead an army in a last stand against Li Siyuan, was killed when the army at Luoyang itself mutinied.

=== After Emperor Zhuangzong's death ===
When Li Jiji heard of Emperor Zhuangzong's death, he had advanced to Xingping (興平, in modern Xianyang, Shaanxi). He decided to withdraw westward and considering using Fengxiang (鳳翔, in modern Baoji, Shaanxi) as a further base of operations. When he reached Wugong (武功, in modern Xianyang), Li Congxi instead suggested that he should go ahead and advance toward Luoyang to try to take it over. However, by this point, the defender of Chang'an, Zhang Jian (張籛), apparently having turned against him, had already destroyed the bridge on the Wei River, forcing Li Jiji's army, which was then north of the Wei, to have to swim across the Wei. Once it reached Weinan (渭南, in modern Weinan, Shaanxi), Li Jiji's attendants began to abandon him, and even Li Congxi, by this point, was stating to him, "It is over. You, Prince, need to decide what to do for yourself." Li Jiji initially wept, and then fell onto a bed and told Li Huan to strangle him with a rope. (Ren took over the command of the army and took it back to Luoyang, submitting to Li Siyuan.)

== Notes and references ==
- Old History of the Five Dynasties, vol. 51.
- New History of the Five Dynasties, vol. 14.
- Zizhi Tongjian, vols. 270, 271, 272, 273, 274, 275.
