= Dai Siyuan =

Chinese general

Dai Siyuan (戴思遠) (died 935) was a Chinese military general and politician of the Chinese Five Dynasties and Ten Kingdoms period Later Liang state, serving for several years as the supreme commander of the Later Liang forces against its archrival Jin (predecessor state to Later Tang). After Later Tang conquered Later Liang, Dai continued to serve Later Tang until his death.

== Background ==
Dai Siyuan's biography in the History of the Five Dynasties gave no family background or birthdate for him. However, it described him as a long-time officer under Zhu Quanzhong, who would eventually found the Later Liang. It was said that during the time that he served under Zhu, he was known for his military capabilities.

== During Later Liang ==
=== During Emperor Taizu's reign ===
After Zhu Quanzhong seized the Tang throne in 907, establishing Later Liang (as its Emperor Taizu), Dai Siyuan, who was serving as an imperial guard general, was made the prefect of Jin Prefecture (晉州, in modern Linfen, Shanxi). In 908, he was again made an imperial guard general, and then was made the defender (防禦使, Fangyushi) of Hua Prefecture (華州, in modern Weinan, Shaanxi). In 909, he returned to the imperial guards as a general there.

=== During Zhu Yougui's and Zhu Zhen's reigns ===
In 912, Emperor Taizu was assassinated by his son Zhu Yougui the Prince of Ying, who took the throne. Zhu Yougui made Dai Siyuan the military prefect (團練使, Tuanlianshi) of Ming Prefecture (洺州, in modern Handan, Hebei). During the subsequent reign of Zhu Yougui's younger brother Zhu Youzhen (who overthrew Zhu Yougui and took over the throne), Dai was made the acting military governor of Baoyi Circuit (保義, headquartered in modern Xingtai, Hebei). In 913, he was made full military governor of Baoyi.

Prior to Emperor Taizu's death, the Yan general Zhang Wanjin (張萬進) had killed military governor of Yan's Yichang Circuit (義昌, headquartered in modern Cangzhou, Hebei), Liu Jiwei (劉繼威) (the son of Yan's emperor Liu Shouguang), and then surrendered the circuit to Later Liang. Emperor Taizu then renamed the circuit Shunhua (順化) and made Zhang its military governor, but in 913 Zhang, fearing that he was not being trusted by Later Liang, offered to give up the post and become a military governor south of the Yellow River (i.e., in the heartland of Later Liang territory). Zhu Zhen initially replaced Zhang with Liu Shouguang's brother Liu Shouqi (劉守奇), who was then a Later Liang general, but at a later point apparently replaced Liu Shouqi with Dai. In 916, after Li Cunxu, the prince of Later Liang's archrival Jin, wrested control of the powerful Tianxiong Circuit (天雄, headquartered in modern Handan), to Shunhua's south, from Later Liang, he sent an army north to attack Shunhua. Fearing that he was being trapped, Dai abandoned Shunhua and fled back to the Later Liang capital Daliang.

At a later point, Dai was made the military governor of Tianping Circuit (天平, headquartered in modern Tai'an, Shandong). In 919, after then-supreme commander of Later Liang forces on the northern border with Jin, Wang Zan (王瓚), was suffering defeats at the hand of Li Cunxu and Li Cunxu's generals, Zhu recalled Wang and replaced him with Dai. In 921, when Li Cunxu was dealing with the aftermaths of the assassination of his ally Wang Rong the Prince of Zhao at the hands of Wang Rong's adoptive son Zhang Wenli and opting to attack Zhang, Dai tried to take advantage by attacking the Jin frontline from the south but was defeated by LI Cunxu's adoptive brother Li Cunshen. However, in 922, he was successful in defeating and capturing another adoptive brother of Li Cunxu's, Li Cunru (李存儒) the prefect of Wei Prefecture (衛州, in modern Puyang, Henan), as well as the cities in the region. It was said that it dealt the Jin army a heavy loss (as they lost one third of the military storage of their army) and reversed a trend of falling morale for the Later Liang army.

However, during his campaigns, Dai left the defense of Tianping's capital Yun Prefecture (鄆州) in the hands of his officers Lu Shunmi (盧順密), Liu Suiyan (劉遂嚴), and Yan Yong (燕顒). In summer 923 — shortly after Li Cunxu declared himself the emperor of a new Later Tang (as its Emperor Zhuangzong), Lu defected to Later Tang and revealed to the Later Tang emperor that Yun was being defended by less than 1,000 soldiers and that neither Liu nor Yan was supported well by the soldiers. The Later Tang emperor commissioned his adoptive brother Li Siyuan to launch a surprise attack on Yun, capturing it. In light of Yun falling to the Later Tang forces, which Zhu Zhen believed Dai was responsible for, he stripped the supreme commander role from Dai and demoted him to be the acting military governor of Xuanhua Circuit (宣化, headquartered in modern Nanyang, Henan). (Dai was therefore sidelined during the campaign over the next few months, in which Later Liang was destroyed by Later Tang.)

== During Later Tang ==
Later in the year, after Later Tang's Emperor Zhuangzong captured Daliang and Zhu Zhen committed suicide, ending Later Liang, Dai Siyuan went from Xuanhua's capital Deng Prefecture (鄧州) to Daliang to show submission to the new emperor. Emperor Zhuangzong returned him to Xuanhua. After Emperor Zhuangzong himself was killed in a mutiny in 926 and succeeded by Li Siyuan (as Emperor Mingzong), Dai was made the military governor of Wuding Circuit (武定, headquartered in modern Hanzhong, Shaanxi). After Meng Zhixiang the military governor of Xichuan Circuit (西川, headquartered in modern Chengdu, Sichuan) and Dong Zhang the military governor of Dongchuan Circuit (東川, headquartered in modern Mianyang, Sichuan) jointly rebelled against Emperor Mingzong in 930, Dai, as he was a friend of Dong's, wanted to avoid suspicion, so he asked to give up his command. Emperor Mingzong summoned him back to then-capital Luoyang to serve in the imperial guards, and later had him retire because of old age. He died in 935, during the reign of Emperor Mingzong's adoptive son Li Congke.

== Notes and references ==
- History of the Five Dynasties, vol. 64.
- Zizhi Tongjian, vols. 268, 269, 271, 272.
