= Consort Zhang (Zhu Zhen) =

Chinese emperor

Consort Zhang, imperial consort rank Defei (張德妃) (892 – November 4, 915) was the wife of Zhu Zhen (Zhu Youzhen), the last emperor of the Chinese Five Dynasties and Ten Kingdoms period state Later Liang.

== Early life ==
The future Consort Zhang was a daughter of Zhang Guiba (張歸霸), a general under Later Liang's founding emperor (and the father of Zhu Zhen, who was then known as Zhu Youzhen) Emperor Taizu. While Zhu Youzhen was the Prince of Jun under Emperor Taizu, he married Lady Zhang as his wife and princess. After he became emperor in 913, he wanted to create Princess Zhang empress, but Princess Zhang, citing the fact that he had not formally offered sacrifices to heaven and earth as an emperor, declined.

In 915, Princess Zhang became seriously ill. Zhu Youzhen, who had changed his name to Zhu Zhen by that point, created her the imperial consort rank of Defei. She died the same night as the creation. After her death, her brothers Zhang Handing (張漢鼎) and Zhang Hanjie (張漢傑), as well as her cousins Zhang Hanlun (張漢倫) and Zhang Hanrong (張漢融), became close associates of his, and they, along with his brother-in-law Zhao Yan, were traditionally blamed for corruption and offering him bad advice that led to the decline and fall of the Later Liang state.

== Notes and references ==
- History of the Five Dynasties, vol. 11.
- New History of the Five Dynasties, vol. 13.
- Zizhi Tongjian, vol. 269.

Regnal titles
Preceded by Empress Zhang	Consort to Sovereign of China (most regions); 913–915	Succeeded by Consort Han of Later Tang
Preceded by Empress Zhang	Consort to Sovereign of China (Guangdong/Guangxi); 913–915	Succeeded by Empress Ma of Southern Han
