= Later Liang (Five Dynasties) =

Imperial state in China from 907 to 923

Liang 梁
- 907–923
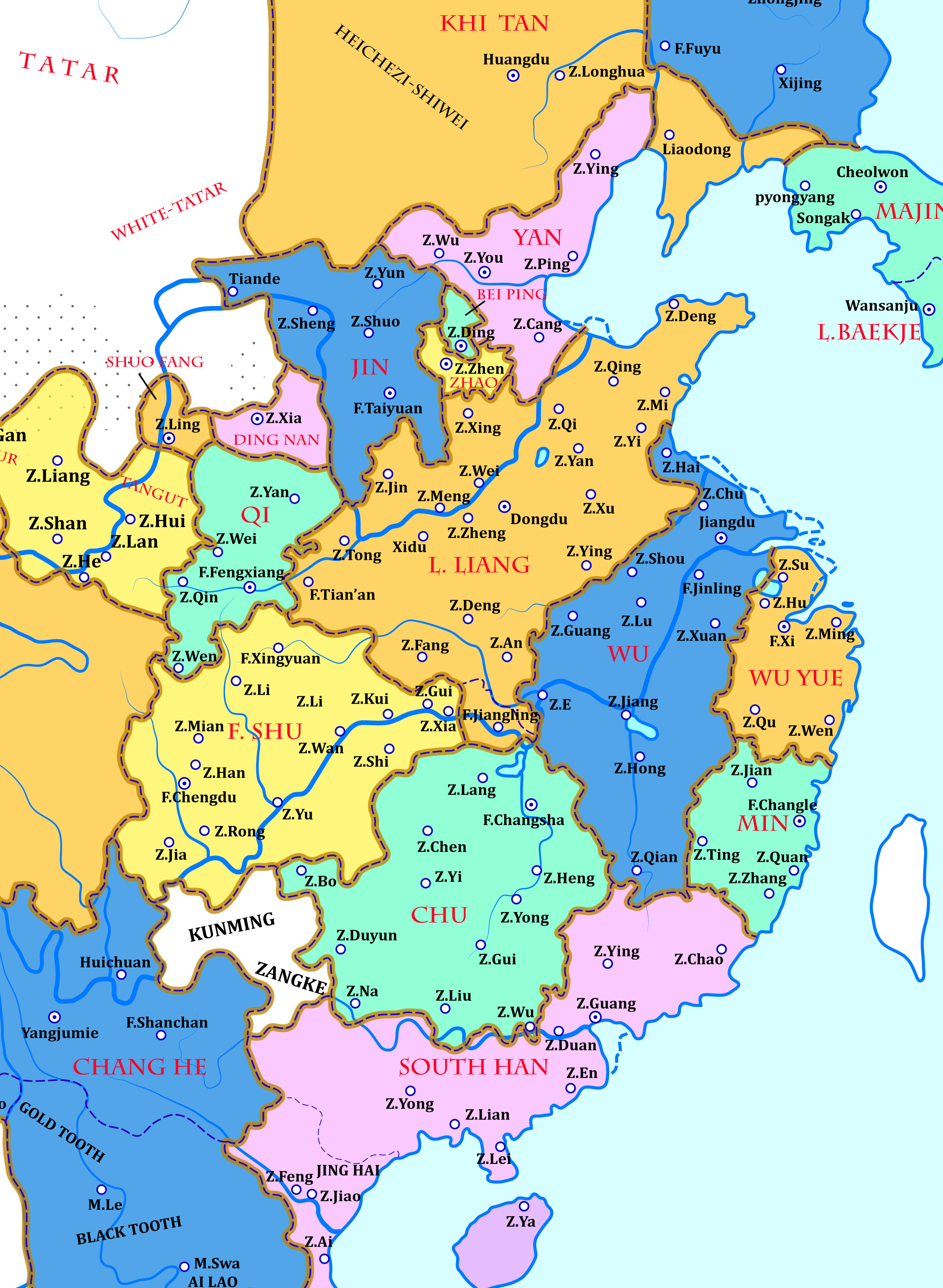
- Capital: Luoyang (907–913); Kaifeng (913–923)
- Common languages: Middle Chinese
- Government: Monarchy
- Emperor
  - 907–912: Emperor Taizu
  - 912–913: Zhu Yougui
  - 913–923: Emperor Modi
- Historical era: Five Dynasties
  - Established: 1 June 907
  - Surrender of Kaifeng: 19 November 923
Preceded by
Tang dynasty
Succeeded by
Later Tang
Jie Yan
Zhao
- Today part of: China

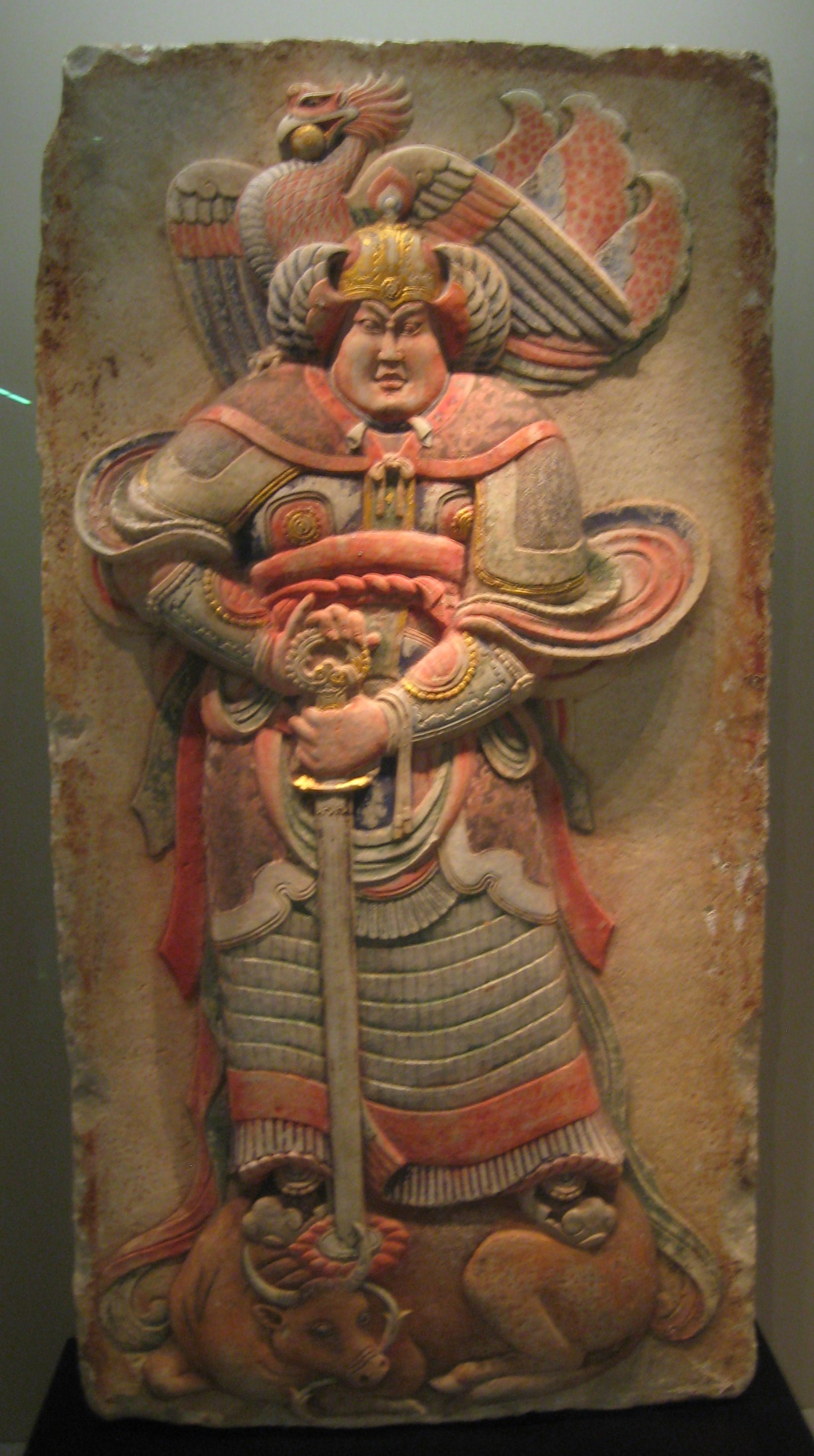
Stone relief from the tomb of Wang Chuzhi. National Museum, Beijing

Liang, known in historiography as the Later Liang (simplified Chinese: 后梁; traditional Chinese: 後梁; pinyin: Hòu Liáng) (1 June 907 – 19 November 923) or the Zhu Liang (Chinese: 朱梁), was an imperial dynasty of China and the first of the Five Dynasties during the Five Dynasties and Ten Kingdoms period. It was founded by Zhu Wen (Emperor Taizu), after he forced the last emperor of the Tang dynasty to abdicate in his favour (and then murdered him). The Later Liang would last until 923 when it was destroyed by the Later Tang dynasty.

== Formation ==
Zhu Wen initially allied himself as Huang Chao's lieutenant. However, he took Huang's best troops and established his own power base as a warlord in Kaifeng. By 904, he had exerted control over both of the twin Tang dynasty capitals of Chang'an and Luoyang. Tang emperor Zhaozong was ordered murdered by Zhu in 904 and the last Tang emperor, Ai Di (Emperor Ai of Tang), was deposed three years later. Emperor Ai of Tang was murdered in 908, also ordered by Zhu.

Meanwhile, Zhu Wen declared himself emperor of the new Later Liang in Kaifeng in 907. The name Liang refers to the Henan region in which the heart of the regime rested.

== Extent of control ==
The Later Liang controlled most of northern China, though much of Shaanxi (controlled by the Qi) as well as Hebei (controlled by the Yan state) and Shanxi (controlled by Shatuo Turks state Jin) remained largely outside Later Liang control.

== End of the dynasty ==
The Later Liang maintained a tense relationship with the Shatuo Turks, due to the rivalry between Zhu Quanzong and Li Keyong, a relationship that began back in the time of the Tang dynasty. After Li Keyong's death, his son, Li Cunxu, continued to expand his State of Jin. Li was able to destroy the Later Liang in 923 and found Later Tang.

== Conference of the Mandate of Heaven on the Later Liang ==
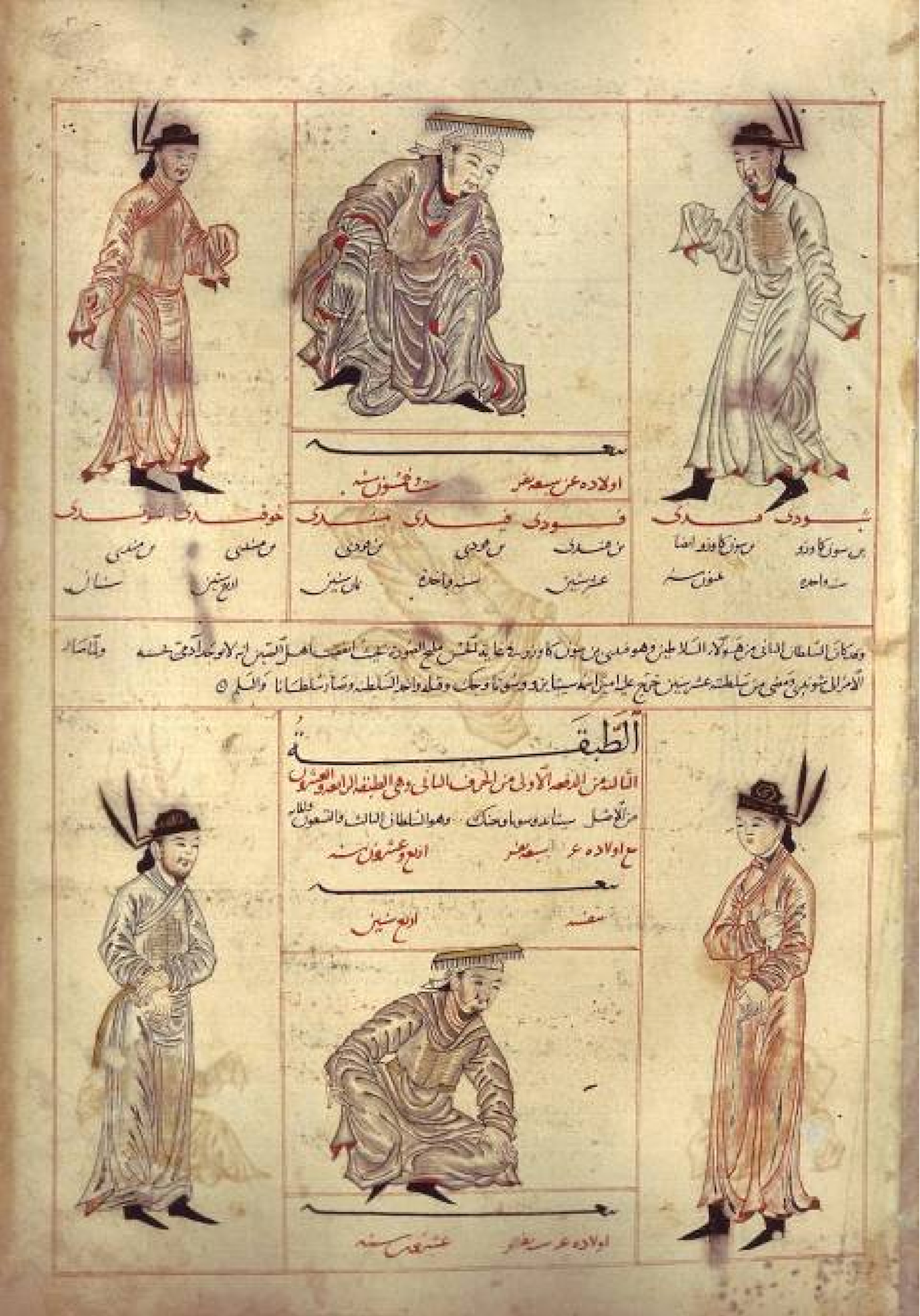
Two Emperors of the Qi and Liang Dynasties, in Jami al-Tawarikh (Compendium of Chronicles), by Rashid al-Din, Iran, 1306 CE

Generally through Chinese history, it was historians of later kingdoms whose histories bestowed the Mandate of Heaven posthumously on preceding dynasties. This was typically done for the purpose of strengthening the present rulers' ties to the Mandate themselves. Song dynasty historian Xue Juzheng did exactly this in his work History of the Five Dynasties.

Several justifications were given for this, and successive Five Dynasties regimes, to be conferred the Mandate of Heaven. Among these was that these dynasties all controlled most of the traditional Chinese heartland. However, the Later Liang was an embarrassment in the brutality it employed, causing many to want to deny it this status, but doing so would break the chain through the other Five Dynasties, and thus to the Song dynasty, which itself was the successor to the last of the Five Dynasties.

== Rulers ==
Temple names	Posthumous names	Family names and given name	Chinese naming conventions	Durations of reigns	Era names and their according durations
Taìzǔ (太祖)	Too Tedious;thus unused when referring to this sovereign	Zhū Wēn (朱溫)	Family name and given name	907–912	Kaīpíng (開平) 907–911; Qiánhuà (乾化) 911–912
Did not exist	none	Zhu Yougui (朱友珪)	Family name and given name	912–913	Qiánhuà (乾化) 912–913; Fènglì (鳳曆) 913
Did not exist	Mò (末) (Note: Mo ("last") is not a true posthumous name, but he is often referred to as "Emperor Mo" as the last emperor of the dynasty.)	Zhū Zhèn (朱瑱)	Family name and given name	913–923	Qiánhuà (乾化) 913–915; Zhēnmíng (貞明) 915–921; Lóngdé (龍德) 921–923

=== Rulers' family tree ===
Later Liang

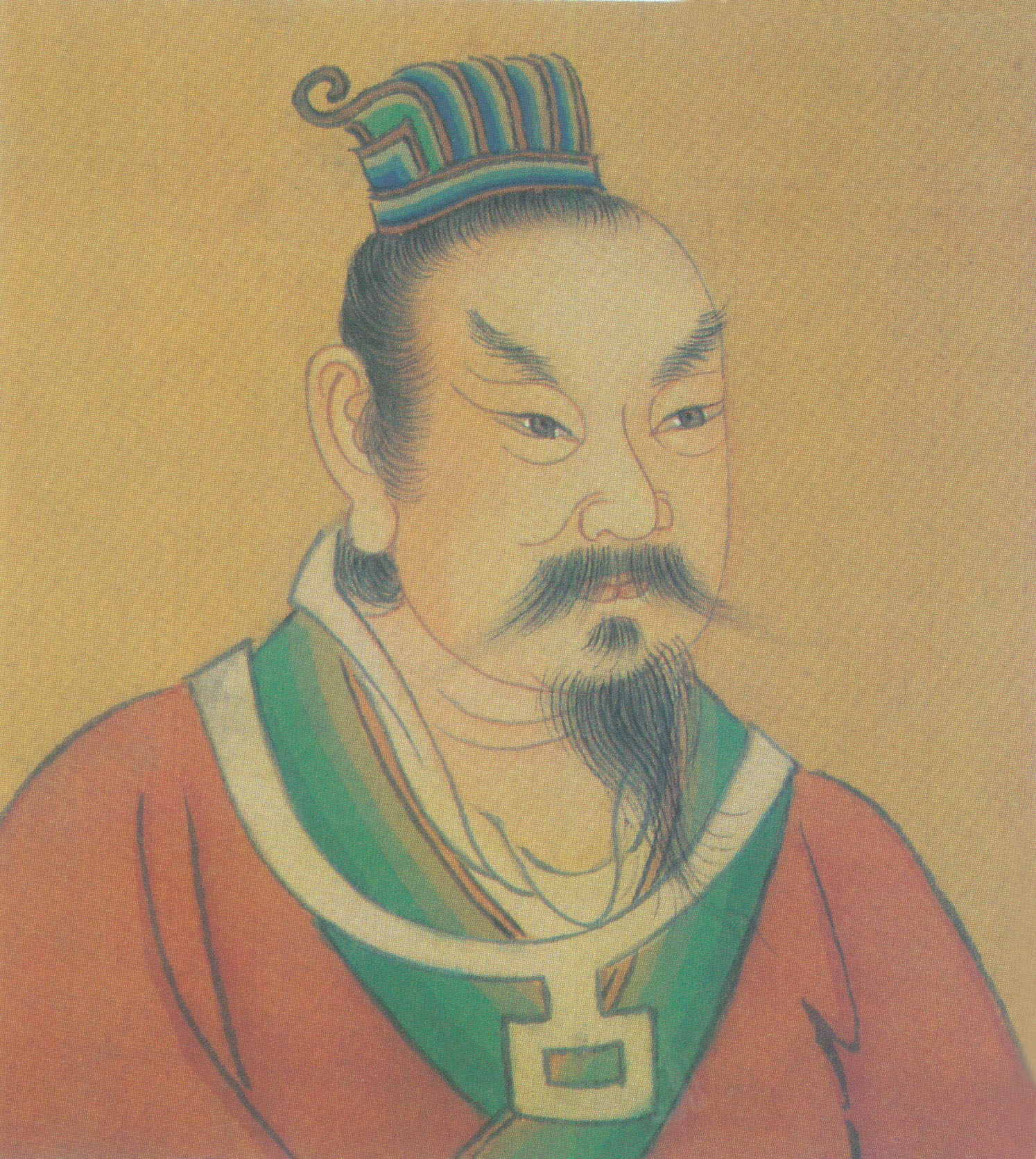
Zhu Wen 朱溫 852–912 Taizu 太祖; 907–912
3	8
Zhu Yougui 朱友圭 d. 913; 912–913	Zhu Zhen 朱瑱 888–923; Modi 末帝; 913–923

== See also ==
- Huang Chao
- Jiedushi
- Tang dynasty
