= Wang Zhaozuo =

Historical Chinese personage

Wang Zhaozuo (Chinese: 王昭祚) (died 921) was the oldest son and heir apparent of Wang Rong, the only ruler of the Chinese Five Dynasties and Ten Kingdoms period state of Zhao.

== During Tang Dynasty ==
It is not known when Wang Zhaozuo was born. His family had controlled Chengde Circuit (成德, headquartered in modern Shijiazhuang, Hebei, the later basis for the Zhao state) for generations, by the time of his birth. As of 900, during the reign of Emperor Zhaozong of Tang, when Wang Zhaozuo's father Wang Rong was serving as Chengde's military governor (Jiedushi), Wang Zhaozuo was serving as the deputy military governor, the traditional position for the military governor's successor. That year, Chengde came under the attack of the major warlord Zhu Quanzhong the military governor of Xuanwu Circuit (宣武, headquartered in modern Kaifeng, Henan), Wang Rong sued for peace by offering a large tribute of colored silk to Zhu, and also offered Wang Zhaozuo and the sons or brothers of key Chengde officers as hostages to show his intent to submit to Zhu. Zhu accepted the tribute and the hostages, and after taking Wang Zhaozuo back to his capital Bian Prefecture (汴州), gave one of his daughters to Wang Zhaozuo in marriage.

== After Tang Dynasty ==
For years after that, there were no historical references made to Wang Zhaozuo himself. In 907, when Zhu Quanzhong forced Emperor Zhaozong's son and successor Emperor Ai to yield the throne to him, ending Tang Dynasty and starting a new Later Liang with him as its Emperor Taizu, Wang Zhaozuo's wife would have been created as Princess Puning. Meanwhile, the new Later Liang emperor also created Wang Rong the Prince of Zhao. (By this point, Chengde Circuit had been renamed Wushun, to observe naming taboo, as Emperor Taizu's father was named Zhu Cheng (朱誠 — not the same character as "Cheng" (成) in Chengde, but a homophone.)

At some point, Wang Zhaozuo and Princess Puning must have returned to Wushun, as, while no historical references were made to him, historical references were made to her presence in 910. That year, Emperor Taizu, suspicious of whether Wang Rong and Wang Chuzhi the military governor of neighboring Yiwu Circuit (義武, headquartered in modern Baoding, Hebei), who had submitted to him but remained in de facto control of their circuits, would remain permanently submissive to him, decided to try to seize control of both circuits by force. He thus had his attendants Du Tingyin (杜廷隱) and Ding Yanhui (丁延徽) seize Wushun's Shen (深州) and Ji (冀州, both in modern Hengshui, Hebei) Prefectures by trick and commissioned the major general Wang Jingren to prepare a full attack on the two circuits to seize them. When Wang Rong was unable to retake Shen and Ji himself, he and Wang Chuzhi sought aid from Li Cunxu, the prince of Later Liang's archenemy Jin. When Li Cunxu, against the advice of some of his generals, decided to aid Wang Rong, he dismissed Princess Puning's presence there (which the generals opposing the action cited as possibly showing that Wang Rong was intending trickery on Later Liang's behalf) as inconsequential. After Li Cunxu successfully helped Wang Rong in repelling Wang Jingren, Wang Rong's domain effectively became an independent Zhao state, and the Wushun name was changed back to Chengde.

In 920, Wang Rong, who had become accustomed to luxurious living, alienated his army by spending too much time at his vacation home in the mountains west of Zhao's capital Zhen Prefecture (鎮州). The soldiers mutinied and killed Wang Rong's favorite eunuch Shi Ximeng (石希蒙), and in response, Wang Rong killed the eunuch Li Honggui (李弘規) and the officer Li Ai (李藹), whom he blamed for inciting the mutiny, and slaughtered Li Honggui's and Li Ai's families. He transferred Li Honggui's and Li Ai's authorities to Wang Zhaozuo (who was then still serving as deputy military governor) and Wang Zhaozuo's adoptive brother Wang Deming. Wang Rong continued to pursue those whom he considered to be Li Honggui's and Li Ai's associates, and many were killed. Wang Deming, who by this point had formed the ambition to overthrow his adoptive father, falsely informed the guards that Wang Rong was intending to slaughter them all, causing a general panic in the guard corps. In spring 921, the guards mutinied and killed Wang Rong. They offered the leadership of the circuit to Wang Deming. Wang Deming accepted, and changed his name back to Zhang Wenli. He captured Wang Zhaozuo the next day, and had Wang Zhaozuo decapitated in front of the army camp. He then slaughtered Wang Rong's clan, sparing only Princess Puning, hoping that this would open the possibility of Later Liang assistance, as Later Liang was then ruled by Emperor Taizu's son and Princess Puning's brother Zhu Zhen. (However, the Later Liang assistance would never come, and, after Zhang Wenli himself died shortly after, Li Cunxu was able to defeat and execute Zhang Wenli's son and successor Zhang Chujin, absorbing the Zhao lands into Jin.)

== Notes and references ==
- History of the Five Dynasties, vol. 54.
- New History of the Five Dynasties, vol. 39.
- Zizhi Tongjian, vols. 262, 271.
