= Li Cunjin =

Imperial Chinese general (855-922)

Personal details
- Born: Sun Chongjin; 855 likely modern Hohhot, Inner Mongolia
- Died: 24 September 922 modern Shijiazhuang, Hebei
- Spouse: Liu
- Children: Sun Hanshao (孫漢韶), son; Sun Hanwei (孫漢威), son; Sun Hanyin (孫漢殷), son; Sun Hanxun (孫漢郇), son; Sun Hanyun (孫漢筠), son; Sun Lu'er (孫禄兒), son; Sun Huan'er (孫歡兒), son
- Full name: Surname: Sūn (孫), later changed to Lǐ (李); Given name: Chóngjìn (重進), later changed to Cúnjìn (存進)

Li Cunjin
- Traditional Chinese: 李存進
- Simplified Chinese: 李存进
Transcriptions
Standard Mandarin
- Hanyu Pinyin: Lǐ Cúnjìn
- Wade–Giles: Li^{3} Ts'un^{2}-chin^{4}

Li Cunjin (李存進) (855 – 24 September 922), originally Sun Chongjin (孫重進), was a military general in imperial China's Tang dynasty, and later the Jin territory in the ensuing Five Dynasties and Ten Kingdoms period after Tang's collapse. He served the Shatuo leaders Li Keyong — who adopted him as a son — and Li Keyong's biological son and successor Li Cunxu. He died in the battles against Zhang Chujin.

== Biography ==
Sun Chongjin was a native of the northern territory called Zhenwu (振武; around modern Hohhot, Inner Mongolia). He began following Li Keyong when the latter attacked Shuozhou (in modern Shanxi) and became an adopted son some time later with the new name Li Cunjin. After the suppression of the rebel Huang Chao, Li Cunjin rose to a commissioner of Army of Righteous Sons (義兒軍使).

After the death of Li Keyong, Li Cunjin served Li Keyong's successor Li Cunxu when their Jin state fought the Later Liang. In 910, Li Cunjin helped his lord win the battle at Baixiang County (in modern Hebei), and was promoted to inspector-in-chief of forces at large (行營馬步軍都虞候) to govern Cizhou (慈州; modern Ji County, Shanxi) and Qinzhou (沁州; modern Qinyuan County, Shanxi). After 915, he became a chief officer (都部署) of the newly conquered Tianxiong Command (天雄軍). There he instilled strict measures on the surrendered Later Liang troops: anyone violating the regulations would be openly beheaded or dismembered, and this approach effectively prevented any possible unrest. He was promoted to military governor of Zhenwu Command (振武軍; headquartered in modern Hohhot) after participating in the battles along the Yellow River.

In 921, Zhang Wenli usurped the power in Zhao, eliciting a military response from Li Cunxu. The attacks were unsuccessful as many Jin generals died in battles, including Li Sizhao. Li Cunxu then asked Li Cunjin to replace Li Sizhao as the commissioner of bandit suppression (招討使). As the soil was poor at the crossing where he quartered his men, he was not able to construct ramparts, so palisades were made instead. When the palisade went under attack by the troops of Zhang Wenli's son Zhang Chujin, Li Cunjin rose atop a bridge to direct his troops and died in the battles. He was conferred a grand marshal (太尉) posthumously.

His son Li Hanshao (李漢韶), later renamed Sun Hanshao (孫漢韶), also became a military general.
