= Zhu Youqian =

Zhu Youqian (Chinese: 朱友謙) (died March 9, 926), né Zhu Jian (朱簡), known as Li Jilin (李繼麟) from 923 to 926, courtesy name Deguang (德光), formally the Prince of Xiping (西平王), was a Chinese military general, monarch, politician, and warlord of the late Chinese dynasty Tang dynasty and the first two dynasties of the subsequent Five Dynasties and Ten Kingdoms period, Later Liang and Later Tang, ruling Huguo Circuit (護國, headquartered in modern Yuncheng, Shanxi) during most of that time. Both he and his family were extremely honored by Emperor Zhuangzong of Later Tang, but later, he was falsely accused of plotting a rebellion, and Emperor Zhuangzong put him and his entire family to death.

== Background ==
It is not known when Zhu Jian was born. His family was from Xu Prefecture (許州, in modern Xuchang, Henan), and both his grandfather Zhu Yan (朱巖) and father Zhu Cong (朱琮) were minor military officers at Zhongwu Circuit (忠武, headquartered at Xu Prefecture). During Huang Chao's rebellion, Zhu Jian left his home area and became a subordinate of Bo Kui (柏夔) the defender of Mianchi Base (澠池鎮, in modern Sanmenxia, Henan). At some point, he left that army post and became a bandit, but yet later again an army officer under Wang Gong the military governor of Baoyi Circuit (保義, headquartered in modern Sanmenxia).

Wang was impatient and harsh, and his subordinates had no love for him. Even the officer Li Fan (李璠), whom Wang favored and often depended on, could not escape severe caning for minor faults. As a result, Li secretly resented Wang. Further, Wang had engaged a lengthy struggle with his cousin Wang Ke the military governor of Huguo Circuit to try to take over Huguo, but was repeatedly defeated, and the army morale was low. In 899, Li started a mutiny and killed Wang Gong, and the soldiers supported him to be acting military governor. Several months later, Zhu further overthrew Li and claimed the title of acting military governor, and became a vassal of the powerful warlord Zhu Quanzhong the military governor of Xuanwu Circuit (宣武, headquartered in modern Kaifeng, Henan). (The main traditional historical sources differ as to Li's fate, with Zhu's biographies in both the History of the Five Dynasties and the New History of the Five Dynasties indicating that Li fled to Zhu Quanzhong's capital Bian Prefecture (汴州) (with the New History of the Five Dynasties further stating that Zhu Jian was involved in Li's mutiny against Wang Gong) while the Zizhi Tongjian stated that Zhu killed Li.)

== Rule of Baoyi Circuit ==
In 900, under Zhu Quanzhong's support, Zhu Jian was commissioned to be acting military governor, and then full military governor of Baoyi, by then-reigning Emperor Zhaozong of Tang. After Emperor Zhaozong was forcibly taken by the powerful eunuchs to Fengxiang Circuit (鳳翔, headquartered in modern Baoji, Shaanxi), which was then ruled by the eunuchs' ally Li Maozhen, in 901, Zhu Quanzhong, who was allied with the chancellor Cui Yin and was trying to take Emperor Zhaozong back from the eunuchs' and Li Maozhen's control, was frequently traveling through Baoyi Circuit to deal with the campaign and was treated with respect by Zhu Jian. As a result, after a subsequent siege by Zhu on Fengxiang's capital Fengxiang Municipality forced Li Maozhen to slaughter the eunuchs and surrender Emperor Zhaozong to Zhu Quanzhong, Zhu Quanzhong had Zhu Jian given the honorary chancellor designation Tong Zhongshu Menxia Pingzhangshi (同中書門下平章事). When Zhu Quanzhong subsequently forced Emperor Zhaozong to move the capital from Chang'an to Luoyang in 904, the forced move of the imperial court was so rushed that not even the imperial officials accompanying Emperor Zhaozong had proper clothes to wear. Zhu Jian prepared 100 sets and had them given to the officials when the imperial train travelled through Baoyi Circuit. Subsequently, after Emperor Zhaozong's arrival in Luoyang, Zhu Jian was given the greater honorary chancellor title of acting Shizhong (侍中). As Zhu Jian shared a family name with Zhu Quanzhong, he thereafter sent a petition to Zhu Quanzhong, stating:

Your servant has reached the positions of general and chancellor, but comparatively, I had no real contributions. It was only because you, Lord Generalissimo, gave me such grace. I hope to serve you for as long as I am still living and not turned into ashes and dust. May it be that you give me your surname and a new personal name, so that I can follow your family.

Zhu Quanzhong greatly appreciated this request, so he changed Zhu Jian's name to Zhu Youqian ("You" being the generational character in the personal names of all of Zhu Quanzhong's sons and nephews), and added Zhu Youqian to his family roll, treating Zhu Youqian as a son. Thereafter, Zhu Youqian served him faithfully and contributed to his campaigns.

== Rule of Huguo Circuit ==
=== Under Emperor Taizu of Later Liang ===
In 907, Zhu Quanzhong forced Emperor Zhaozong's son and successor Emperor Ai to yield the throne to him, ending Tang and starting a new Later Liang with him as its Emperor Taizu. Emperor Taizu moved Zhu Youqian to the more prosperous Huguo Circuit as military governor and also gave him the title of acting Taiwei (太尉, one of the Three Excellencies). He was eventually also given the greater honorary chancellor title of Zhongshu Ling (中書令) and created the Prince of Ji. He was known to have received the former Tang official Su Xun (蘇循) and Su Xun's son Su Kai (蘇楷) as his guests as of 907, when Emperor Taizu, while having received input from Su Xun on preparations of taking the throne but having looked down on Su for what he considered to be selling out the Tang imperial house, forced Su to retire.

In 910, believing that two prefectures of Huguo, Jin (晉州, in modern Linfen, Shanxi) and Jiang (絳州, in modern Yuncheng), were too close to Later Liang's borders with its archenemy Jin and therefore was strategically important in Later Liang's campaign against Jin, Zhu Youqian offered to have them carved out of his circuit so that a general can be dedicated to their defense. Emperor Taizu agreed, and carved those two prefectures out of Huguo and making them, in addition to Qin Prefecture (沁州, in modern Changzhi, Shanxi), into a new Dingchang Circuit (定昌), making Hua Wenqi (華溫琪) the prefect of Jin its military governor (to reward Hua for his having earlier been successful in repelling a Jin attack).

=== Vacillation between Later Liang and Jin ===
In 912, Emperor Taizu was assassinated by his son Zhu Yougui the Prince of Ying, who, after blaming the assassination on his adoptive brother Zhu Youwen the Prince of Bo and executing Zhu Youwen, took the throne himself. However, rumors quickly spread that Zhu Yougui was the killer, and, despite Zhu Yougui's attempts to placate them with promotions and gifts, many of the senior generals were angry with him. Zhu Youqian was particularly vocal, and when Zhu Yougui's emissary announcing Emperor Taizu's death arrived at Huguo, Zhu Youqian wept and stated to the emissary:

The late Emperor had spent decades establishing the empire. Not long ago, when the mutiny occurred within the palace, the rumors that developed were awful to hear. Even I, serving as a peripheral defender for the empire, was ashamed by them.

Zhu Yougui tried to placate Zhu Youqian by bestowing him dual chancellor titles of Shizhong and Zhongshu Ling, and wrote an edict to defend himself against rumors of patricide. He also summoned Zhu Youqian to Luoyang for a meeting. Zhu Youqian refused, stating:

Who is it on the throne now? The late Empire's death was not a natural one. I will soon head to Luoyang myself to investigate. There is no need to summon me.

Zhu Yougui, knowing that Zhu Youqian would not follow his orders, commissioned the general Han Qing (韓勍) to attack Zhu Youqian. Zhu Youqian therefore surrendered Huguo Circuit to Jin's prince Li Cunxu, seeking for Jin aid. Zhu Yougui therefore sent the general Kang Huaizhen (康懷貞) the military governor of Ganhua Circuit (感化, headquartered in modern Weinan, Shaanxi) against Zhu Youqian, with Han serving as Kang's deputy. Kang and Niu Cunjie (牛存節) the military governor of Zhongwu Circuit (忠武, headquartered in modern Weinan as well) subsequently launched an intense siege on Huguo's capital Hezhong Municipality (河中). Li Cunxu sent his adoptive brothers Li Cunshen, Li Sigong (李嗣肱), and Li Si'en (李嗣恩) to aid Zhu Youqian, and he himself then personally headed to Huguo to intercept Kang. Li Cunxu defeated Kang at Jie County (解縣, in modern Yuncheng), forcing Kang to withdraw back to Shan Prefecture (陝州, the capital of Baoyi, now named Zhenguo (鎮國)). In gratitude, Zhu Youqian personally went to Li Cunxu's camp with only unarmed guards to thank him. He honored Li Cunxu as if Li Cunxu were a maternal uncle and bowed to Li Cunxu. Li Cunxu held a feast for Zhu, kept Zhu at his tent overnight, and held another feast for Zhu the next day, before Zhu departed. It was said that as Zhu slept, Li Cunxu looked at him and commented, "The Prince of Ji truly has an honored physique, except for his arms being short."

In 913, Emperor Taizu's nephew Yuan Xiangxian launched a countercoup against Zhu Yougui at Luoyang, and Zhu Yougui, surrounded, committed suicide. Yuan supported Zhu Yougui's younger brother Zhu Youzhen the Prince of Jun as the new emperor, and Zhu Youzhen thereafter claimed the throne, moving the capital to Daliang (the old capital of Xuanwu Circuit), where he was at the time. (He also changed his name to Zhu Zhen.) He wrote Zhu Youqian to urge Zhu Youqian to return to the Later Liang fold, and Zhu Youqian did so, recognizing him as emperor and used the Later Liang era name to show submission. However, Zhu Youqian did not cut off relations with Jin altogether. (Despite this continued relationship, however, Huguo troops (along with troops from Zhenguo, Ganhua, and Zhongwu Circuits) participated in a surprise attack that the Later Liang general Wang Tan (王檀) launched on the Jin capital Taiyuan in 916 while the main Jin strength under Li Cunxu was battling Later Liang forces under Liu Xun to the east, which nearly captured Taiyuan before being repelled.)

In 920, Zhu Youqian launched a surprise attack on Zhongwu Circuit's capital Tong Prefecture (同州), expelling its military governor Cheng Quanhui (程全暉). He then made his son Zhu Lingde (朱令德) Zhongwu's acting military governor and submitted a petition to Zhu Zhen, requesting that Zhu Lingde be made full military governor. Zhu Zhen was angered and initially refused, but later, fearful that Zhu Youqian would resent him, issued an edict making Zhu Youqian military governor of Zhongwu as well. However, by the time that he issued the edict, Zhu Youqian had resubmitted his own circuit to Jin, and Li Cunxu issued an edict in the name of the Tang emperor (as Jin had been existing under the theory that Li Cunxu was exercising powers for the Tang emperor in hopes of Tang's reestablishment) making Zhu Lingde military governor of Zhongwu.

Zhu Zhen reacted by ordering Liu Xun, assisted by other generals Yin Hao (尹皓), Wen Zhaotu (溫昭圖), and Duan Ning, to attack Tong Prefecture. Zhu Youqian sought aid from Li Cunxu, who sent Li Cunshen, his cousin Li Sizhao, as well as Li Jianji (李建及) and another adoptive brother, Li Cunxian (李存賢), to aid Zhu Youqian. They fought the Later Liang forces under Liu to an initial stalemate, and then eventually tired Liu's troops out such that Liu withdrew. The Jin forces then attacked Liu's forces as they withdrew, inflicting great losses. However, during the stalemate, as a result of the warfare, food supplies in Huguo dwindled. Zhu Youqian's sons tried to persuade him to resubmit to Later Liang. Zhu Youqian, however, responded:

In the past, the Prince of Jin personally came to attend to our emergency, lighting candles to fight in the dark. Now that we are again at war with Liang, he sent his generals marching under starry skies to come provide us with people and food. How can I turn against him now?

As one of Liu Xun's children was married to one of Zhu Youqian's children, Liu did not attack quickly initially, sending letters to Zhu Youqian to try to persuade him to return to the Later Liang fold before attacking. Therefore, after the defeat, Yin and Duan made accusations to Zhu Zhen that Liu was intending to make sure that Zhu Youqian would receive Jin aid. As a result, Zhu Zhen had Liu poisoned to death. Meanwhile, as Li Cunxu was at that time considering claiming imperial title himself and was seeking past Tang officials to help him reestablish an imperial government, Zhu Youqian sent Su Xun to him. Li Cunxu, meanwhile, created Zhu Youqian the Prince of Xiping and gave him the title of acting Taiwei.

=== Under Emperor Zhuangzong of Later Tang ===
In 923, Li Cunxu declared himself emperor, establishing Later Tang as its Emperor Zhuangzong. Later that year, he launched a surprise attack on Daliang (which was defenseless with the main Later Liang strength under Duan Ning preparing a major attack on Later Tang north of the Yellow River). Zhu Zhen, caught by surprise and believing that defeat was inevitable, committed suicide, ending Later Liang. The Later Liang regional governors all submitted to Later Tang, and Zhu Youqian went to Daliang to congratulate him. It was said that Emperor Zhuangzong feasted with him and bestowed on him many gifts. He also changed Zhu Youqian's name to Li Jilin, and had his oldest son Li Jiji honor Li Jilin as an older brother. He stated to Li Jilin, "My great accomplishment is due to your contribution, Lord."

Li Jilin subsequently requested that Ci (慈州) and Xi (隰州, both in modern Linfen, Shanxi), which had previously belonged to Huguo, be returned to him. Emperor Zhuangzong declined, but did give him Jiang Prefecture. Also, at Li Jilin's request, in 924, Emperor Zhuangzong allowed him to restart salt production at Anyi (安邑, one of the counties making up Hezhong) and Jie County and put him in charge of the operation, sending revenues to the imperial government on a quarterly basis. Later in the year, Emperor Zhuangzong also granted Li Jilin an iron certificate — a guarantee that he would not be put to death even if he committed death-punishable crimes — and made both Zhu Lingde and another son, Zhu Lingxi (朱令錫), military governors; further, all of Li Jilin's sons, as long as they were old enough to wear official uniforms, were given official titles. It was said that no other household was more honored than Li Jilin's.

== Death ==
Meanwhile, as the years went by in Emperor Zhuangzong's reign, his favorite performers and eunuchs became powerful figures at court. They repeatedly demanded gifts from regional governors, including Li Jilin, and Li Jilin eventually was fed up with their requests and stopped giving them gifts. During Later Tang's 925 campaign against Former Shu (which resulted in Former Shu's destruction), titularly commanded by Li Jiji but with Emperor Zhuangzong's chief of staff Guo Chongtao as the actual commander, Li Jilin held a ceremonial examination of the Huguo troops before sending Zhu Lingde with his troops to follow Li Jiji and Guo. Emperor Zhuangzong's favorite performer Jing Jin (景進) and the eunuchs used the opportunity to falsely accuse Li Jilin of preparing to rise against Emperor Zhuangzong and being in league with Guo (whom the performers and eunuchs were also falsely accusing of treason and planning to secede with the Former Shu territory). Li Jilin decided that the way to end the rumors was to go Luoyang to personally meet with Emperor Zhuangzong, and he went to Luoyang in spring 926, despite his close associates' attempts to persuade him not to, under the belief that his going to Luoyang might allow him not only to save himself but also Guo.

As Li Jilin was heading to Luoyang, however, Emperor Zhuangzong's wife Empress Liu, who firmly believed in rumors of Guo's being treasonous, had already, without his approval, issued an order for Li Jiji to kill Guo. Li Jiji therefore had his servant Li Huan (李環) assassinate Guo with a hammer and also killed his sons Guo Tinghui (郭廷誨) and Guo Tingxin (郭廷信). Emperor Zhuangzong, receiving news of Guo's death, also killed Guo Chongtao's other sons. Further, when he received news that his brother Li Cun'ai (李存乂) the Prince of Mu, who was a son-in-law of Guo's, was angry about Guo's death, he also had Li Cun'ai killed. Jing then accused Li Jilin of being in league with Guo and Li Cun'ai. Emperor Zhuangzong therefore issued an order moving Li Jilin from Huguo to Yicheng Circuit (義成, headquartered in modern Anyang, Henan), but that night, had his guard commander Zhu Shouyin surround Li Jilin at his mansion, chase him out of Hui'an Gate (徽安門) and kill him outside the gate. He ordered Li Jilin's name posthumously changed back to Zhu Youqian, and also ordered Zhu Lingde and Zhu Lingxi killed at their circuits. Then, he sent Li Shaoqi (李紹奇) the military governor of Heyang Circuit (河陽, headquartered in modern Jiaozuo, Henan) to Hezhong to slaughter Zhu Youqian's family. Knowing that she could not escape, Zhu Youqian's wife Lady Zhang met Li Shaoqi with 200 members of her household, and stated to him that while the Zhu household should be killed, the household servants should not, so at her request Li Shaoqi spared them, saving some 100 lives. Before she and her family members were to be killed, she also showed the iron certificate that Emperor Zhuangzong had bestowed on Zhu Youqian, stating sarcastically, "This was what the Emperor had given. I am an illiterate woman, and I do not know what it says." Li Shaoqi felt ashamed, but still carried out the orders and executed her and the other Zhu family members. Seven of Zhu's subordinates who served as prefectural prefects were also killed along with their families. After Emperor Zhuangzong was shortly later killed in a mutiny at Luoyang and succeeded by Li Siyuan (as Emperor Mingzong), Emperor Mingzong posthumously restored Zhu Youqian's titles and ordered that the properties of his family be given to any family members who survived the massacre. (However, it is not clear that any actually did.)

== Notes and references ==
- History of the Five Dynasties, vol. 63.
- New History of the Five Dynasties, vol. 45.
- Zizhi Tongjian, vols. 261, 262, 266, 267, 268, 271, 272, 273, 274.
