= Zhu Huang =

Zhu Huang may refer to:

- Zhu Wen (852–912), the first Later Liang emperor during the Five Dynasties period, known as Zhu Huang after 907
- Zhu Youzhen (888–923), Zhu Wen's son and the last Later Liang emperor, known as Zhu Huang between 913 and 915
