= Zhang Chujin =

- Traditional Chinese: 張處瑾
- Simplified Chinese: 张处瑾
Transcriptions
Standard Mandarin
- Hanyu Pinyin: Zhāng Chùjǐn
- Wade–Giles: Chang Ch'u-chin

Zhang Chujin (died 922) was a Chinese officer who was briefly ruler of Zhao or Chengde in what is now Shijiazhuang, Hebei, during the Five Dynasties and Ten Kingdoms Era of Chinese history. His father Zhang Wenli had been adopted by Wang Rong, a military governor (jiedushi) of Chengde who declared its independence of the Later Liang under the name Zhao in 910. In 921, Zhang Wenli prompted a mutiny that killed Wang, executed his natural children, and attempted to ally himself with neighboring Jin by nominally submitting to its authority and describing himself as its military governor for the area. Confronted with mounting evidence of Zhang Wenli's treachery, however, Li Cunxu of Jin ordered an invasion, which supposedly caused Zhang to die of shock. Zhang Chujin then attempted to hold out against Jin but was captured and killed in 922.

== Life ==
=== Early years ===
It is not known when or where Zhang Chujin was born. His father Zhang Wenli had been an army officer in Lulong (盧龍) around modern Beijing but, after a failed mutiny, fled Lulong to Chengde, where he impressed its military governor (jiedushi) Wang Rong so much that Wang adopted him under the name Wang Deming. Zhang Chujin had at least two younger brothers, Zhang Chuqiu (張處球) and Zhang Chuqi (張處琪).

Upon the fall of the Tang dynasty in 907, Wang Rong submitted himself to the new Later Liang, receiving the title Prince of Zhao in gratitude. In only 910, however, Later Liang attempted to assert direct control over his lands, prompting him to declare his independence in alliance with nearby Yiwu and Jin.

=== Mutiny at Zhenzhou ===
In 920, a failed mutiny prompted a series of reprisals by Wang Rong that allowed Wang Deming to manipulate the guards of Zhao's capital Zhenzhou (now Zhengding in Hebei) into a successful uprising in 921. Wang Rong was killed and replaced by his adopted son, who resumed use of the name Zhang Wenli and executed Wang's natural children. Zhang initially succeeded in placating Li Cunxu, the king or prince of Jin, by nominally submitting to his authority and resuming the title of military governor. Li was already involved in a prolonged conflict with Zhu Zhen of the Later Liang, in which he was assisted by Zhao troops that had been led first by Zhang Wenli and then by Fu Xi (符習).

=== Jin invasion ===
Zhang Wenli began to find pretexts to remove, imprison, or execute Wang Rong's former officers, and Fu began to urge Li to invade and avenge his long loyal ally. Jin also intercepted several secret messengers from Zhang to Zhu Zhen, emperor of the Later Liang, and Abaoji, emperor of the Khitans. Faced with mounting evidence of Zhang's disloyalty, Li Cunxu finally ordered a campaign against Zhang. His generals Yan Bao (閻寶) and Shi Jiantang (史建瑭) commanded the Jin troops and Fu Xi—named acting military governor of Chengde—commanded the Zhao corps. Zhang Wenli was already ill but supposedly died of shock upon hearing that an invasion had begun and had already quickly taken Zhaozhou (趙州).

Zhang Chujin took over leadership but kept news of his father's death a secret to avoid the damage to his men's morale. His capital Zhenzhou was soon besieged but, commanded by Zhang Chujin and his brother Chuqiu, the Zhao soldiers were able to inflict a number of unexpected losses on the invaders from the fall of 921 to the fall of 922. They killed Shi Jiantang in battle; routed Yan Bao, prompting him to die in shame; inflicted a mortal injury on Li Cunxu's cousin Li Sizhao; and killed Li Cunxu's adopted brother Li Cunjin in battle.

The Zhangs were, however, unable to secure effective assistance. Later Liang refused to aid them. Wang Chuzhi of Yiwu was unable to help before he was himself overthrown by his adopted son Wang Du. The Khitan emperor Abaoji did attempt to send help, but the Khitans were defeated and forced to withdraw by Li Cunxu himself. Zhang Chujin attempted to surrender once Zhenzhou's food supplies ran out, but Li Cunxu did not respond to his emissaries. Li Cunshen, another of Li Cunxu's adopted brothers, arrived to oversee the end of the siege. Zhenzhou fell and Zhang Chujin, his two brothers, and Zhang Wenli's wife (whose relation to the children is uncertain) were captured, had their legs broken, and were then delivered to Li Cunxu. They seem to have been executed, as the people of Zhao are reported to have asked to eat their flesh.
