= Zhang Wenli =

- Traditional Chinese: 張文禮
- Simplified Chinese: 张文礼
Transcriptions
Standard Mandarin
- Hanyu Pinyin: Zhāng Wénlǐ
- Wade–Giles: Chang Wên-li

Wang Deming
- Chinese: 王德明
Transcriptions
Standard Mandarin
- Hanyu Pinyin: Wáng Démíng
- Wade–Giles: Wang Tê-ming

Zhang Wenli (died 15? September 921), (Note: According to the Zizhi Tongjian, Zhang Wenli died in shock after hearing that the Jin army captured Zhaozhou on 15 September, implying that he died on or shortly after that day.) known as Wang Deming during the time that he was an adoptive son of Wang Rong, was a Chinese general and official who initially served under the late Tang dynasty warlord Liu Rengong and Liu Rengong's son Liu Shouwen, and later Wang Rong, king of the early Five Dynasties and Ten Kingdoms period state Zhao (also known as Chengde). Wang Rong favored him for his talent and adopted him as a son. However, in 921, Zhang encouraged Wang Rong's guards to mutiny and slaughter the Wang clan. He then took over Zhao. When Wang Rong's ally Li Cunxu, Prince of Jin, attacked in response, he is said to have died in shock.

== Life ==
=== Early years ===
It is uncertain exactly which year Zhang Wenli was born, although it is recorded that he was originally from Youzhou (now Beijing).

=== Attempted mutiny at Cangzhou ===
At some point after Liu Rengong, then the military governor (jiedushi) of Lulong (盧龍) around Youzhou, conquered the neighboring Yichang (義昌) area around modern Cangzhou, Hebei, and made his son Liu Shouwen the military governor of Yichang in 898, he sent Zhang to Yichang to serve there. On an occasion when Liu Shouwen was at Youzhou to see his father, Zhang took over Yichang's capital Cangzhou (滄州) and refused to let Liu Shouwen return. However, the people of Cangzhou then rose against him, causing him to flee to neighboring Chengde around modern Shijiazhuang, Hebei. Wang Rong, then the military governor of Chengde, was impressed by Zhang's speech and his claims about knowing how to lead an army, so he adopted Zhang as a son, changing his name to Wang Deming and entrusting much of Chengde's military affairs to him. This all must have occurred before 907, when the Tang fell and Liu Rengong was overthrown by another son, Liu Shouguang.

=== Assisting Jin ===
Wang Rong was created Prince of Zhao by Zhu Wen after he overthrew the Tang and declared the Later Liang but Zhu subsequently attempted to directly annex Wang's territory in 910, prompting him to declare Zhao's independence and to ally himself with Li Cunxu, the prince of Jin. The next year, in 911, Jin and Zhao forces defeated the Later Liang army and forced it to withdraw. In gratitude, Wang Rong took 37 corps out of his army and put them under Wang Deming's command, sending him to accompany and assist Li Cunxu in his campaigns.

In 912, when Li Cunxu was set to launch a major attack against Liu Rengong's son and successor Liu Shouguang, who had claimed the title of emperor under a new Yan dynasty, Wang Deming joined forces with Li Cunxu's general Zhou Dewei and Cheng Yan (程巖), who commanded an army from Jin and Zhao's ally Yiwu, located around modern Baoding, Hebei. They subsequently besieged Youzhou. By the end of the year, however, Wang seems to have no longer been participating in the campaign, for he was recorded as taking 30,000 men to raid Later Liang's northern territory and capturing Zongcheng (宗城) in modern Xingtai, Hebei. The Later Liang general Yang Shihou counterattacked and defeated him, killing some 5000 of his men.

In 913, while Zhou still had Liu Shouguang besieged at Youzhou, Zhu Wen's son, the new Later Liang emperor Zhu Zhen, sent Yang and Liu Shouguang's brother Liu Shouqi (劉守奇), who had submitted to Later Liang, north to attack Zhao, apparently to divert Zhao and Jin's attention from Liu Shouguang. When Wang Rong sought aid from Zhou, Zhou sent his officer Li Shaoheng (李紹衡) to join Wang Deming in resisting the Later Liang army. Subsequently, the Later Liang army left Chengde and headed for Yichang.

=== Mutiny at Zhenzhou ===
By 920, Wang Rong had recalled Wang Deming back to Chengde to command his guard corps, while sending another officer, Fu Xi (符習), to replace him as the commander of the Zhao forces accompanying Li Cunxu. That year, Wang Rong, who had become accustomed to luxurious living, alienated his army by spending too much time at his vacation home in the mountains west of Zhao's capital Zhenzhou, now Zhengding in Shijiazhuang, Hebei. The soldiers mutinied and killed Wang Rong's favorite eunuch Shi Ximeng (石希蒙) and, in response, Wang Rong killed the eunuch Li Honggui (李弘規) and the officer Li Ai (李藹), whom he blamed for inciting the mutiny, and slaughtered both their families. He transferred Li Honggui and Li Ai's positions to his son Wang Zhaozuo and Wang Deming. Wang Rong continued to pursue those whom he considered to be Li Honggui and Li Ai's associates, and many were killed. Wang Deming, who by this point had formed the ambition to overthrow his adoptive father, falsely informed the guards that Wang Rong was intending to slaughter them all, causing a general panic in the guard corps. In the spring of 921, the guards mutinied and killed Wang Rong. They offered the leadership of the realm to Wang Deming. Wang Deming accepted and changed his name back to Zhang Wenli. He then slaughtered Wang Rong's clan, sparing only Wang Zhaozuo's wife, who was a sister of Zhu Zhen's and who carried the Later Liang title of Princess Puning, hoping that this would open the possibility of Later Liang assistance.

=== Military governor of Chengde ===
Zhang Wenli sent a report of what occurred to Li Cunxu, requesting to be commissioned as a military governor (jiedushi) while at the same time offering to support him as emperor. Li Cunxu then only carried the title of Prince of Jin and nominally remained a Tang subject. Li Cunxu's initial instinct was to attack Zhang for his slaughter of the Wang clan, but Li Cunxu's advisors thought that, as Jin was locked in a struggle with Later Liang at that point, it should not create another enemy. Li Cunxu therefore commissioned Zhang as the acting military governor of Chengde.

However, Zhang was fearful that the Jin prince would eventually attack him. He thus repeatedly sent secret messengers to both Zhu Zhen and the Khitan Emperor Taizu. Zhu Zhen, despite the urging of his chancellor Jing Xiang, took no action, believing that Zhang was not truly a trustworthy subject. Many of these secret messengers were, however, intercepted by Jin forces. Li Cunxu released the secret messengers back to Zhang, further increasing Zhang's fear about what Li Cunxu might do next. He was also fearful that the senior officers of Zhao might rebel against him and often found excuses to kill them. He tried to appease Fu Xi by promoting Fu Xi's son Fu Zimeng (符子蒙) while recalling Fu Xi back to Chengde. Fu, instead, met with Li Cunxu, urging Li Cunxu to avenge Wang Rong.

=== Jin invasion ===
In the fall of 921, Li Cunxu commissioned Fu as the acting military governor of Chengde and launched a general campaign against Zhang. He sent his generals Yan Bao (閻寶) and Shi Jiantang (史建瑭) to assist Fu. Together, the Jin troops and Fu's Chengde troops attacked Zhaozhou. The Zhao prefect Wang Ting (王鋌) surrendered quickly. Upon hearing the fall of Zhaozhou, Zhang, who was then suffering from an abdominal illness, supposedly died in shock. His son Zhang Chujin took over command of Chengde, but was defeated and killed by Li Cunxu's forces in 922. Li Cunxu annexed Chengde and had Zhang Wenli's body exhumed and cut in pieces in public.

== See also ==
- Chengde Province
- Kingdom of Zhao
