= Zhu Youzhen =

Emperor of Later Liang from 913 to 923

Zhu Youzhen 朱友貞

Emperor of the Later Liang dynasty
- Reign: 913 – November 18, 923
- Predecessor: Zhu Yougui
- Successor: Dynasty abolished
- Born: 20 October 888
- Died: 18 November 923 (aged 35)
Full name
- Family name: Zhū (朱); Given name: Originally Yǒuzhēn (友貞), later Huáng (鍠) (changed 913), later Zhèn (瑱) (changed 915)
Era dates
- Qiánhuà (乾化) (913–915); Zhēnmíng (貞明) (915–921); Lóngdé (龍德) (921–923)
- House: Zhu
- Dynasty: Later Liang

Zhu Zhen (Chinese: 朱瑱) (20 October 888 – 18 November 923), often referred to in traditional histories as Emperor Mo of Later Liang (後梁末帝, "last emperor") and sometimes by his princely title Prince of Jun (均王), né Zhu Youzhen (朱友貞), known as Zhu Huang (朱鍠) from 913 to 915, was the third and last emperor of China's Later Liang dynasty during the Five Dynasties and Ten Kingdoms period, ruling from 913 to 923. He ordered his general Huangfu Lin (皇甫麟) to kill him in 923 when Emperor Zhuangzong of Later Tang (Li Cunxu), the emperor of Later Liang's enemy Later Tang to the north, was on the cusp of capturing the Later Liang capital Daliang. His death marked the end of Later Liang, which was to be the longest among the Five Dynasties. Despite his ten-year reign being the longest of all the Five Dynasties emperors (if one does not count Li Cunxu's reign as the Prince of Jin prior to taking imperial title) sources on his era are relatively scarce, as many Later Liang records were destroyed following the Later Tang conquest of the Later Liang (as the Later Tang viewed the Later Liang as an illegitimate regime).

== Background ==
Zhu Youzhen was born 888, at what was then Tang dynasty's Bian Prefecture (汴州, in modern Kaifeng, Henan), as the fourth son of his father Zhu Quanzhong, who was then a major warlord as the military governor of Xuanwu Circuit (宣武, headquartered at Bian Prefecture). His mother was Zhu Quanzhong's wife Lady Zhang, and he was her only known biological son. He was described to be handsome, not talkative, and favoring scholars. In 900, he received the title of military advisor at Henan Municipality (河南, i.e., the Luoyang region).

== During Emperor Taizu's reign ==
In 907, Zhu Quanzhong had Tang's final emperor Emperor Ai yield the throne to him, ending Tang and starting a new Later Liang with him as its Emperor Taizu. He created his sons princes, and Zhu Youzhen received the title of Prince of Jun. Around that time, Emperor Taizu had just established a corps of imperial guards known as the Tianxing Army (天興軍), and he made Zhu Youzhen one of the two commanders of the Tianxing Army. In 910, Emperor Taizu gave him the honorary title of acting Sikong (司空, one of the Three Excellencies) and, in addition to command of the Tianxing Army, gave him the title of commander of forces at the eastern capital (i.e., Bian Prefecture, which by this point was known as Daliang, with Emperor Taizu having established Luoyang as capital).

== During Zhu Yougui's reign ==
By 912, Emperor Taizu was seriously ill. He was considered to have favored his second son—an adoptive son, not a biological one—Zhu Youwen the Prince of Bo, the most. (At that time, he had his daughters-in-law attend to him in the palace, and he often made them have sexual relations with him. He favored Zhu Youwen's wife Lady Wang the most, and partly due to that favored Zhu Youwen the most as well.) When he believed that he was near death, he sent Lady Wang to Daliang, where Zhu Youwen was serving as its defender, to summon Zhu Youwen to him. This drew anger and fear from his third son, Zhu Yougui the Prince of Ying, particularly since at that time he also issued an edict sending Zhu Yougui out of the capital to serve as the prefect of Lai Prefecture. Zhu Yougui thus entered the palace and assassinated Emperor Taizu. Keeping Emperor Taizu's death a secret, he sent the eunuch Ding Zhaopu (丁昭溥) to Daliang, and, in Emperor Taizu's name, ordered Zhu Youzhen to kill Zhu Youwen. After Zhu Youzhen did so and Ding returned to Luoyang to inform him, he announced Emperor Taizu's death, blaming the assassination on Zhu Youwen. He then took the throne. He made Zhu Youzhen the defender of Daliang and the capital of Kaifeng Municipality (i.e., the Daliang region).

However, it was said that Zhu Yougui quickly caused the people to be discontented with him, due to his frivolous acts. Further, the rumors that he had been the one who killed Emperor Taizu were spreading in the army. Soon thereafter, Zhu Youzhen's brother-in-law (Emperor Taizu's son-in-law) Zhao Yan and cousin (Emperor Taizu's nephew) Yuan Xiangxian were secretly plotting to overthrow Zhu Yougui. Zhao informed this to Zhu Youzhen, and Zhu Youzhen agreed with the plot, and further sent his close associate Ma Shenjiao (馬慎交) to Tianxiong Circuit (天雄, headquartered in modern Handan, Hebei) to persuade the major general Yang Shihou the military governor of Tianxiong to join the plot, and Yang agreed. Zhu Youzhen further persuaded the elite Longxiang Army (龍驤軍) soldiers then at Daliang to join the plot as well, and then prepared to rise and attack Luoyang. However, before Zhu Youzhen could launch his own forces, Yuan and Zhao rose at Luoyang and killed Zhu Yougui. They then offered the throne to Zhu Youzhen, who accepted, but moved the capital to Daliang and took the throne there.

== Reign ==
=== Early reign ===
After he took the throne, Zhu Youzhen changed his name to Zhu Huang, and later to Zhu Zhen. He sent overtures to the general Zhu Youqian, who had submitted Huguo Circuit (護國, headquartered in modern Yuncheng, Shanxi) to Later Liang's archrival Jin, upon Zhu Yougui's assassination of Emperor Taizu, and Zhu Youqian agreed to resubmit to Later Liang.

The return of Zhu Youqian to the Later Liang fold, however, did not change the threat against Later Liang of Jin's expanding power, which Emperor Taizu had been very concerned about prior to his death. He also had to guard against two other rival states, Qi and Wu. In 914, he stationed the general Kang Huaiying (康懷英) at Yongping Circuit (永平, headquartered in modern Xi'an, Shaanxi), to guard against Qi. Meanwhile, he tried to commission his brother Zhu Youzhang (朱友璋) the Prince of Fu as the military governor of Wuning Circuit (武寧, headquartered in modern Xuzhou, Jiangsu), to replace the Zhu Yougui-commissioned military governor Wang Yin (王殷). Wang, in fear, submitted to Wu. Zhu Zhen sent the generals Niu Cunjie (牛存節) and Liu Xun, and they, after repelling the Wu general Zhu Jin, captured Wuning's capital Xu Prefecture (徐州). Wang committed suicide.

In 915, Yang Shihou died. As Zhu Zhen had long been apprehensive of Yang's hold over the army, he outwardly mourned Yang but was in fact pleased. Zhao Yan and the official Shao Zan (邵贊) advocated using this opportunity to weaken Tianxiong Circuit, as it had, for most of Tang history up to this point, been a circuit that was de facto independent and difficult to control. Zhu Zhen agreed, and ordered that Tianxiong be divided into two circuits, with three of Tianxiong's six prefectures to belong to a new Zhaode Circuit (昭德, headquartered at Xiang Prefecture (相州), in modern Handan as well). The Tianxiong soldiers resented this division, and mutinied under the leadership of the officer Zhang Yan (張彥), holding the Later Liang-commissioned military governor He Delun (賀德倫) hostage. Zhu Zhen sent a eunuch, Fu Yi (扈異), to try to comfort the Tianxiong soldiers, but was not receptive to Zhang's request that Tianxiong's division be cancelled. Zhang thus decided to surrender the circuit to Jin. Li Cunxu shortly thereafter arrived at Tianxiong and took over control of the circuit. Intense campaigns between the Later Liang army, under Liu Xun's command, and the Jin army subsequently were waged, but the Jin army was continuously victorious over the Later Liang army, and two ambitious surprise-attack attempts by Liu and Wang Tan (王檀) on the Jin capital Taiyuan were repelled by Jin. By fall 916, nearly all of the Later Liang territory north of the Yellow River had fallen to Jin. (During the campaign, the Later Liang morale was sufficiently shaken such that there was even a mutiny against Zhu Zhen at Daliang itself, led by the officer Li Ba (李霸), during which Zhu Zhen had to personally lead guards to defend the palace gate, but the general Du Yanqiu shortly after crushed the mutineers.)

During the campaign, Zhu's wife Consort Zhang died. (Zhu had wanted to create her empress, but she continuously declined in light of the fact that he had not yet offered sacrifice to heaven and earth to solemnify his reign.) His younger brother Zhu Youjing (朱友敬) the Prince of Kang, who had long wanted to displace him, tried to use the occasion of Consort Zhang's funeral as an opportunity to rise to assassinate Zhu Zhen. The emperor, however, discovered this as the assassination was about to take place, and, after fleeing, had the imperial guards locate and kill the hidden assassins, and then executed Zhu Youjing. After this incident, it was said that Zhu only trusted Zhao, as well as Consort Zhang's brothers Zhang Handing (張漢鼎) and Zhang Hanjie (張漢傑) and cousins Zhang Hanlun (張漢倫) and Zhang Hanrong (張漢融), such that he only listened to their advice, to the exclusion of others, including the senior chancellor Jing Xiang and director of imperial governance Li Zhen, both greatly trusted by Emperor Taizu previously.

In 917, an erstwhile vassal of Later Liang's, Liu Yan the military governor of Qinghai Circuit (清海, headquartered in Guangzhou, Guangdong), declared himself emperor of a new independent state of Yue (shortly after to be renamed Han, and therefore known historically as Southern Han).

Also in 917, Liu Xun, who had for some time refused to report to Daliang after his defeats at Li Cunxu's hands, finally did go to Daliang to pay homage to Zhu. Zhu relieved him of his command as the commander of the forces against Jin, and replaced him with He Gui, who had been able to suppress a mutiny at Qing Prefecture (慶州, in modern Qingyang, Gansu) in 916. Later that year, at Zhao's suggestion, Zhu prepared a grand ceremony to sacrifice to heaven and earth at Luoyang, and departed Daliang to do so, despite the contrary advice of Jing. After he left Daliang, however, Jin forces attacked and captured the border fort of Yangliu (楊劉, in modern Liaocheng, Shandong), south of the Yellow River. When the news of Yangliu's fall arrived at Luoyang, it greatly shocked the imperial officials who were attending to Zhu at that point, and there were rumors that Jin had further captured Daliang. Zhu, in panic, and to quell such rumors, cancelled the ceremony and returned to Daliang. After this incident, Jing submitted a petition, discussing his concerns about the northern war with Jin, and offered to command the army himself; Zhu, with Zhao and the four Zhangs disagreeing, declined Jing's offer.

In 918, Li Cunxu gathered all the elite Jin troops that he could garner, and decided to launch one massive attack on Later Liang. Shortly after new year 919, he crossed the Yellow River and headed toward Daliang. He Gui intercepted him at Huliu Slope (胡柳陂, in modern Heze, Shandong). The battle was an initial major rout by the Later Liang forces over Jin forces, but a subsequent Jin counterattack led to massive Later Liang losses as well, making the battle essentially a draw, with both Later Liang and Jin suffering casualties of two-thirds of their army. For quite some time thereafter, neither side dared to attack the other. (Indeed, the Later Liang army was said to have collapsed so completely such that it took over a month for it to reorganize itself.)

=== Late reign ===
In 920, Zhu Youqian, after his having his son Zhu Lingde (朱令德) taking over Zhongwu Circuit (忠武, headquartered in modern Weinan, Shaanxi) was initially met with anger by Zhu Zhen, rebelled against Later Liang and again submitted to Jin. Zhu Zhen sent Liu Xun to attack Zhu Youqian, but Liu was defeated by the Jin generals Li Cunshen (Li Cunxu's adoptive brother) and Li Sizhao (Li Cunxu's adoptive cousin), allowing Zhu Youqian to retain Huguo and remain in the Jin fold. (Subsequently, Zhu Zhen, suspecting Liu of having intentionally not defeating Zhu Youqian (as Liu and Zhu Youqian had children who were married to each other), poisoned Liu to death.)

In 921, Li Cunxu's major ally Wang Rong the Prince of Zhao was assassinated by his adoptive son Wang Deming, who then took over Zhao lands and changed his name back to the birth name of Zhang Wenli. Zhang initially pretended to continue to submit to Li, but fearing (correctly) that Li would act against him, secretly made overtures to both Later Liang and Khitan Empire in preparation for a campaign of resistance. Jing Xiang, pointing out that this was the prime opportunity to counterattack against Jin, argued for launching an army to aid Zhang, while Zhao Yan and the four Zhangs argued against it, reasoning that the Later Liang forces were needed to protect Later Liang's own territory. Zhu Zhen ended up not aiding Zhang Wenli, Zhang Wenli subsequently died and was succeeded by his son Zhang Chujin, who held out against Jin forces until late 922, but was eventually defeated, with Li absorbing Zhao territory into Jin. During Jin's campaign against Zhao, the new Later Liang supreme commander Dai Siyuan was able to attack Wei Prefecture (衛州, in modern Puyang, Henan) and surprise the Jin garrison there, capturing it; this allowed Later Liang to regain its foothold north of the Yellow River and greatly recover in its morale.

In 923, what appeared to be an even greater opportunity for Later Liang to counter the Jin gains occurred. After Li Sizhao died battle in the Zhao campaign in 922, his son Li Jitao seized control the circuit that he had commanded, Zhaoyi Circuit (昭義, headquartered in modern Changzhi, Shanxi), and Li Cunxu, not willing to wage a campaign against him, commissioned him as the acting military governor, renaming it Anyi (安義, as naming taboo for Li Sizhao). However, in spring 923, Li Jitao, fearing that Li Cunxu would eventually act against him anyway, submitted his circuit to Later Liang. Zhu Zhen commissioned him as full military governor and renamed the circuit Kuangyi.

Shortly after, Li Cunxu declared himself the emperor of a new Later Tang. Shortly after, believing that a surprise move against Later Liang was necessary to break the stalemate between the two states, he sent his adoptive brother Li Siyuan to launch a surprise attack Later Liang's Tianping Circuit (天平, headquartered in modern Tai'an, Shandong), south of the Yellow River, catching Later Liang unprepared and capturing Tianping's capital Yun Prefecture (鄆州). In fear and anger over Yun's fall, Zhu demoted Dai (who was Tianping's military governor but who was away commanding the army against Later Tang at the time) and commissioned Wang Yanzhang as the commander of the army against Later Tang instead. Wang quickly attacked and captured the border fort Desheng (德勝, in modern Puyang), intending to use it to cut off the supply line between Later Tang proper and Yun. However, his subsequent battles against Li Cunxu himself were indecisive; further, his commission caused much apprehension in the hearts of Zhao and the Zhangs, as he had long despised what he saw as their wickedness. Zhao and the Zhangs thus defamed him before Zhu, who then removed him and replaced him with Duan Ning. Meanwhile, Zhu also destroyed the Yellow River levee at Hua Prefecture (滑州, in modern Anyang, Henan), causing a flood area, believing that it would impede further Later Tang attacks.

Duan prepared an ambitious plan for a four-prong counterattack against Later Tang:

1. Dong Zhang would head toward the major Later Tang city Taiyuan (formerly Jin's capital).
2. Huo Yanwei would head toward Zhen Prefecture (鎮州, in modern Baoding, Hebei, formerly Zhao's capital).
3. Wang and Zhang Hanjie would head toward Yun Prefecture.
4. Duan himself, along with Du Yanqiu, would confront Later Tang's emperor Li Cunxu.

However, the Later Liang officer Kang Yanxiao, at this junction, defected to Later Tang, revealing Duan's plan to the Later Tang emperor and pointing out that the plan left the Later Liang capital Daliang defenseless, and pointing out that Wang's and Zhang Hanjie's army was the weakest of the four prongs and could easily be defeated. Li Cunxu decided to take the risky move himself, and advanced to Yun to join forces with Li Siyuan, and then engage Wang and Zhang Hanjie. He defeated them, capturing both Wang and Zhang Hanjie at Zhongdu (中都, in modern Jining, Shandong), and then headed directly toward the defenseless Daliang. With Duan's army trapped north of the Yellow River and unable to come to his rescue, Zhu saw the situation as hopeless. He ordered his general Huangfu Lin (皇甫麟) to kill him; Huangfu did, and then committed suicide himself. This thus ended Later Liang. The Song dynasty historian Sima Guang, in his Zizhi Tongjian, commented:

The Lord of Liang was temperate, respectful, frugal, and self-controlled. He was not frivolous or licentious. However, he trusted Zhao and the Zhangs, such that they wielded power and misused it, and he distanced himself from Jing and Li [Zhen], not listening to them, leading to the destruction of the dynasty.

Li Cunxu had Zhu's body buried with respect, but kept his head at the imperial temple. It was not until after Later Tang itself fell that Shi Jingtang, the emperor of the succeeding Later Jin, ordered that Zhu's head be properly buried.

== Personal information ==
- Father
  - Zhu Wen
- Mother
  - Lady Zhang, posthumously honored Empress Yuanzhen
- Wife
  - Consort Zhang, imperial consort title Defei
- Major Concubine
  - Consort Guo
- Daughter
  - Princess Shouchun
  - Princess Shouchang
  - Princess Jin'an

== Notes and references ==
- Old History of the Five Dynasties, vols. 8, 9, 10.
- New History of the Five Dynasties, vol. 3.
- Zizhi Tongjian, vols. 266, 268, 269, 270, 271, 272.

Zhu Youzhen Later Liang Born: 888 Died: 923
Regnal titles
Preceded by Zhu Yougui	Emperor of Later Liang; 913–923	Dynasty destroyed
Preceded by Zhu Yougui	Emperor of China (Guangdong/Guangxi); 913–917	Succeeded by Liu Yan of Southern Han
Preceded by Zhu Yougui	Emperor of China (central); 913–923	Succeeded by Li Cunxu of Later Tang
