= Wang Rong (warlord) =

Tang dynasty jiedushi

Wang Rong 王鎔
- Reign: 910–921
- Born: c. 877
- Died: 921
Full name
- Family name: Wáng (王); Given name: Róng (鎔)
- Dynasty: Zhao

Wang Rong (Chinese: 王鎔; c. 877?–921), was a warlord in the final years of the Tang dynasty who later became the only ruler of the state of Zhao during the Five Dynasties and Ten Kingdoms period. Late in Tang, he initially tried to chart an independent course between the more powerful warlords Zhu Quanzhong and Li Keyong, but later was forced to become Zhu's vassal, although he continued to govern his domain without much interference from Zhu. After Zhu declared himself the emperor of a new dynasty of Later Liang (as Emperor Taizu), Wang continued to serve as a vassal and was created the Prince of Zhao. Later, though, when the Later Liang emperor tried to seize the Zhao domain by force, Wang broke away from Later Liang and realigned with Li Keyong's son and successor Li Cunxu the Prince of Jin instead. In 921, Wang was overthrown and killed in a coup led by his adoptive son Wang Deming, who subsequently took over his domain and changed back to the birth name of Zhang Wenli, before dying later in the year; Li Cunxu then defeated and killed Zhang's son and successor Zhang Chujin, incorporating Zhao into his Jin state.

== Background ==
Wang Rong was probably born in 877. At the time of his birth, his father Wang Jingchong was the military governor (jiedushi) of Chengde Circuit (成德, headquartered in modern Shijiazhuang, Hebei), which the Wang family had held in de facto independence since Wang Jingchong's great-grandfather Wang Tingcou. Wang Rong's mother was a Lady He; it is not known whether she was Wang Jingchong's wife or concubine, but she was described as being virtuous and strict in discipline in her rearing of Wang Rong.

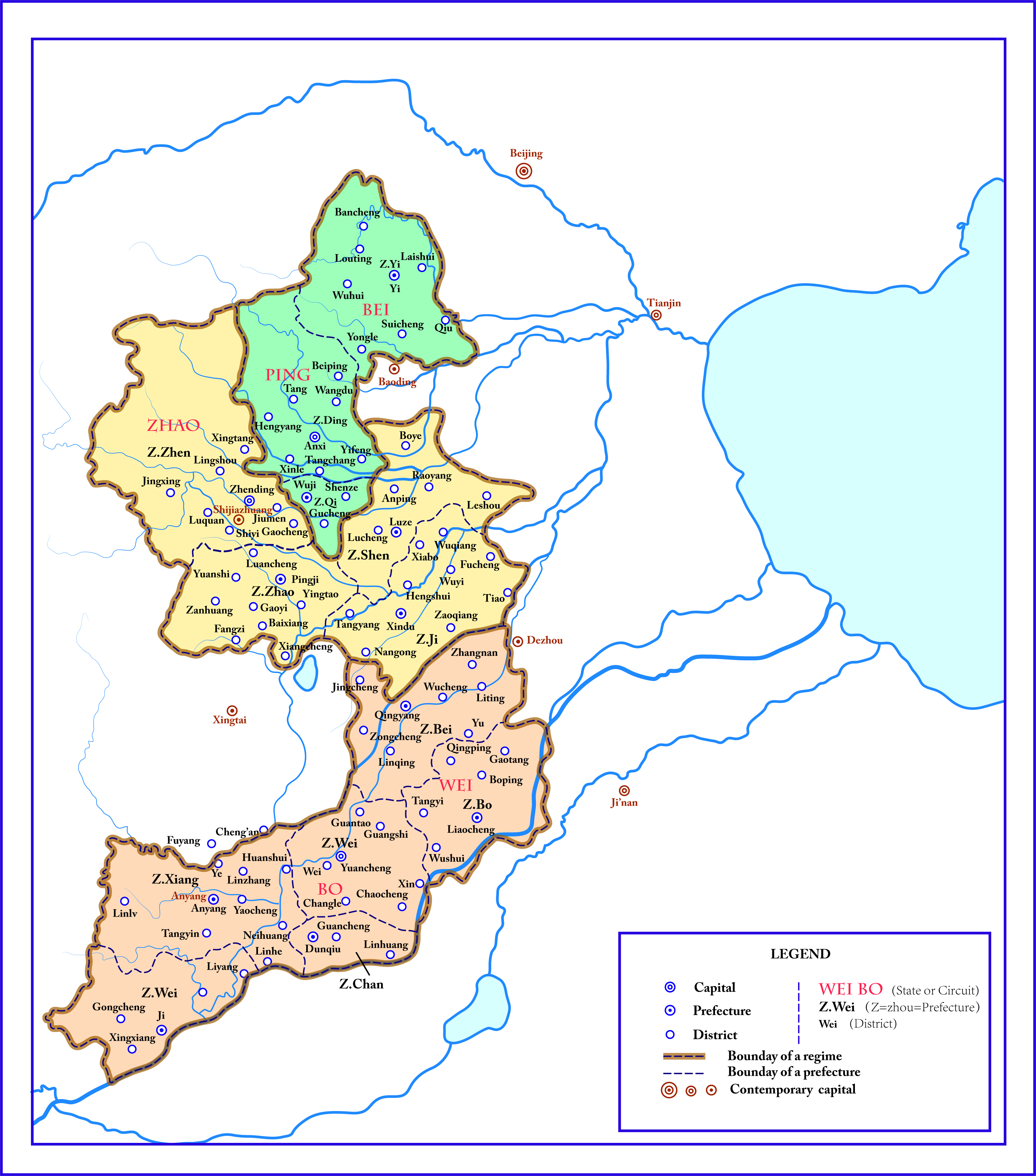

Wang Jingchong died in 883. The soldiers of Chengde supported Wang Rong, who at that time was only six-years-old but held the title of deputy military governor, as the acting military governor. The Tang dynasty emperor Emperor Xizong soon thereafter confirmed him as acting military governor, and later in the year confirmed him as full military governor.

== As Tang dynasty jiedushi of Chengde Circuit ==
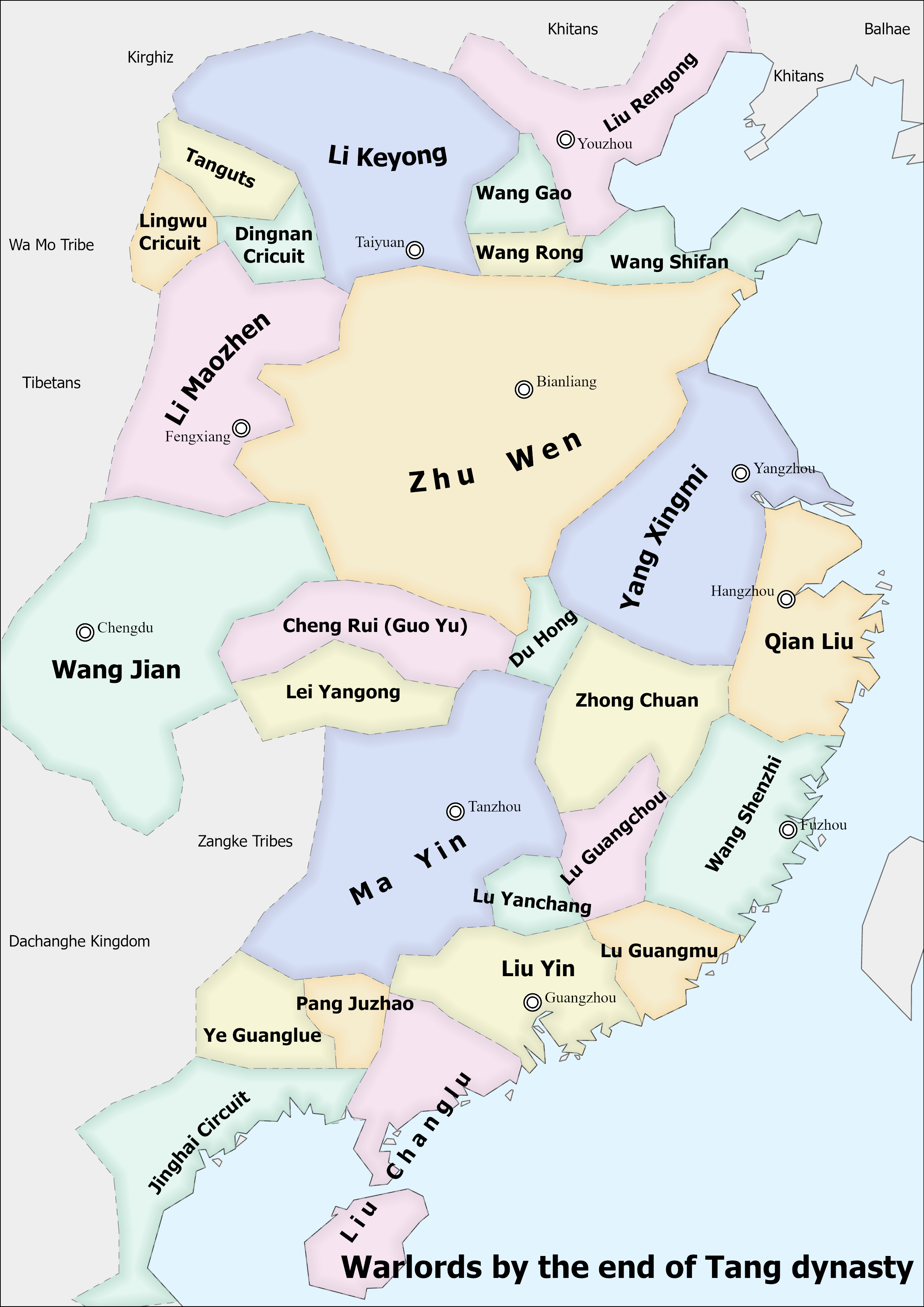
Map of warlords before the end of the Tang dynasty, with the location of Wang Rong's territory

=== Initial alliance with Lulong Circuit ===
By that point, the Tang empire had fallen into a state of confusion, with the military governors of the circuits attacking each other and seizing each other's territory. One of the strongest military governors at the time was Li Keyong, the ethnically-Shatuo military governor of Hedong Circuit (河東, headquartered in modern Taiyuan, Shanxi). Wang Rong's neighbor Wang Chucun the military governor of Yiwu Circuit (義武, headquartered in modern Baoding, Hebei) was allied with Li Keyong, and had his nephew Wang Ye (王鄴) marry one of Li Keyong's daughters. Both Wang Rong and Li Keju the military governor of Lulong Circuit (盧龍, headquartered in modern Beijing) feared the growing strength of Li Keyong and therefore despised Wang Chucun for allying with Li Keyong. They thus entered into an alliance against Wang Chucun, planning to destroy him and divide Yiwu's two prefectures (the capital Ding Prefecture (定州) and Yi Prefecture (易州, in modern Baoding as well)) among themselves. They launched the attack in 885, after persuading Helian Duo the military governor of Datong Circuit (大同, headquartered in modern Datong, Shanxi) to attack Li Keyong's back so that he could not come to Wang Chucun's aid, with Li Keju's officer Li Quanzhong attacking Yi Prefecture and Wang Rong's troops attacking Wuji (無極, in modern Shijiazhuang). Subsequently, with Li Keyong sending his officer Kang Junli to come to Wang Chucun's aid, Wang Rong withdrew, and Li Quanzhong, after initially capturing Yi Prefecture, lost Yi Prefecture again to Wang Chucun's counterattack. Li Quanzhong, fearing punishment from Li Keju, instead returned to Lulong's capital You Prefecture (幽州) and attacked it. Li Keju, facing defeat, committed suicide, allowing Li Quanzhong to take over the circuit.

Subsequently, both Wang Rong and Li Quanzhong's son and successor Li Kuangwei remained enemies to Li Keyong, and in 890, when Emperor Xizong's brother and successor Emperor Zhaozong announced a general campaign against Li Keyong commanded by the chancellor Zhang Jun, he commissioned Wang Rong and Li Kuangwei as two of the commanding generals, although there was no indication Wang Rong actually conducted substantial warfare against Li Keyong on that occasion. (Indeed, it was said that both Wang Rong and Luo Hongxin the military governor of Weibo Circuit (魏博, headquartered in modern Handan, Hebei) viewed Hedong as a guard against expansion of imperial power and therefore refused to contribute troops and supplies to the war effort, contributing to Zhang's subsequent defeat by Li Keyong.)

In 891, after defeating imperial forces, Li Keyong decided to attack Chengde, and he initially prevailed over Chengde forces. Li Kuangwei came to Wang's aid, and Li Keyong withdrew. When Li Kuangwei and Wang jointly attacked the Hedong-held town of Yaoshan (堯山, in modern Xingtai, Hebei), in spring 892, however, Li Keyong's officer Li Sixun (李嗣勳) defeated them and repelled their attack. Subsequently, Li Keyong and Wang Chucun jointly attacked Wang Rong, initially successful, but Wang Rong subsequently repelled them. Thereafter, Emperor Zhaozong sent special envoys to try to pacify the disputes between the four circuits, but no avail.

The battle at Yaoshan, however, led to a development in Wang Rong's favor briefly—as prior to sending Li Sixun, Li Keyong had sent two of his adoptive sons, Li Cunxiao, who was then the acting military governor of Xingmingci Circuit (邢洺磁, headquartered in modern Xingtai), and Li Cunxin, to try to relieve the siege on Yaoshan. As Li Cunxiao and Li Cunxin were rivals to each other for Li Keyong's favors, they did not work well together and would not advance, forcing Li Keyong to send Li Sixun instead. Li Cunxin then accused Li Cunxiao of being in secret communications with Wang Rong and Li Keyong's archrival Zhu Quanzhong the military governor of Xuanwu Circuit (宣武, headquartered in modern Kaifeng, Henan). Li Cunxiao, angry over Li Cunxin's accusations, broke away from Li Keyong and entered into an alliance with Wang Rong and Zhu. When Li Keyong subsequently attacked Li Cunxiao in spring 893, Wang Rong came to Li Cunxiao's aid, although his forces were then defeated by Li Keyong's. In turn, though, when Li Keyong attacked Wang Rong at Chengde's capital Zhen Prefecture (鎮州), Li Cunxiao aided him, but Li Keyong's attack continued. (Wang also sought aid from Zhu, but Zhu was then locked in a campaign against Shi Pu the military governor of Ganhua Circuit (感化, headquartered in modern Xuzhou, Jiangsu) and could not come to Wang's aid.) It took Li Kuangwei's subsequent arrival from Lulong to defeat Li Keyong and force Li Keyong's withdrawal.

However, in Li Kuangwei's absence from Lulong, Li Kuangwei's brother Li Kuangchou mutinied at You Prefecture and took control of Lulong. Hearing of the mutiny, most of Li Kuangwei's soldiers deserted him and fled back to You Prefecture. Li Kuangwei, uncertain what to do next, initially submitted a petition to Emperor Zhaozong, asking to go to the imperial capital Chang'an to serve the imperial government. Wang Rong, however, thankful that Li Kuangwei saved Chengde at great cost to himself, welcomed him back to Zhen Prefecture, built a mansion for him, and honored him as if Li Kuangwei were his father.

Once Li Kuangwei settled in at Zhen Prefecture, he helped Wang Rong build up Zhen's defenses and train the Chengde soldiers. However, Li Kuangwei himself had designs to take over Chengde and, later in 893, on the anniversary of the death of one of Li Kuangwei's parents, when Wang was at Li Kuangwei's mansion to pay his respects, Li Kuangwei had his own soldiers try to seize Wang. Wang, reacting quickly, stated that he was willing to turn the control of the circuit to him but that they should formally do so at the circuit headquarters. Li Kuangwei agreed, and they rode horses together toward headquarters, escorted by Li Kuangwei's soldiers. On the way there, one of the Chengde soldiers, Mo Junhe (墨君和), hidden in a corner, seized Wang and took him out of Li Kuangwei's corps of soldiers. The remaining Chengde troops, once they saw that Wang was out of danger, attacked Li Kuangwei and his troops, slaughtering them and allowing Wang to retain Chengde. (This, however, ended the alliance between Chengde and Lulong, as Li Kuangchou, claiming to be trying to avenge Li Kuangwei's death, would subsequently attack Chengde, although without success.)

=== Independent course ===
Almost immediately after Li Kuangwei's death, Wang Rong tried again to aid Li Cunxiao, whom Li Keyong was sieging in Xingminci's capital Xing Prefecture (邢州). Li Keyong defeated him, however, and in fear, Wang instead joined Li Keyong in attacking Li Cunxiao and sent food supplies to Li Keyong's army. In 894, Li Cunxiao was forced to surrender, and Li Keyong subsequently executed him and took Xingminci back under control.

In 895, Emperor Zhaozong bestowed on Wang the honorary chancellor title of Shizhong (侍中).

In 897, when an attack by Li Maozhen the military governor of Fengxiang Circuit (鳳翔, headquartered in modern Baoji, Shaanxi) forced Emperor Zhaozong to flee from Chang'an to Kuangguo Circuit (匡國, headquartered in modern Weinan, Shaanxi), then governed by Han Jian, Li Keyong wanted to start a campaign to aid the emperor, and therefore wrote Wang Rong and Wang Chucun's son and successor Wang Gao to request them to contribute to the campaign. (There was no record of what Wang Rong's response was, if any.) Li Keyong was subsequently forced to give up on the campaign when his vassal Liu Rengong, whom Li Keyong had installed as the military governor of Lulong after defeating Li Kuangchou, turned against him and became independent. Subsequently, in 898, when Li Keyong considered suing for peace with Zhu Quanzhong in light of his recent setbacks, he wrote Wang Rong and asked Wang to serve as the intermediary between him and Zhu, but Zhu subsequently rejected Li Keyong's overture. Later that year, Emperor Zhaozong gave Wang the honorary chancellor title of Zhongshu Ling (中書令).

In 900, when Zhu sent his general Ge Congzhou to attack Yichang Circuit (義昌, headquartered in modern Cangzhou, Hebei), which Liu Rengong had captured earlier and had given to his son Liu Shouwen to govern, Ge had initial successes against Liu Shouwen, but after Wang Rong sent messengers to mediate and Ge encountered torrential rains, Zhu recalled Ge and his troops.

Zhu, however, then decided that he would attack Wang for communicating with Li Keyong. He approached Zhen Prefecture and attacked it, burning its southern gate. Wang, in fear, sent his assistant Zhou Shi (周式) to plead with Zhu, pointing out both that Wang had parlayed with Li Keyong to achieve peace and that the Chengde people had been loyal to the Wang family for generations and would fight fervently for Wang Rong. Zhu agreed to peace, but had Wang send his oldest son Wang Zhaozuo (王昭祚) and the sons of many Chengde officers to Xuanwu to serve as hostages and had Wang also surrender a large amount of silk. He then withdrew, and he gave a daughter in marriage to Wang Zhaozuo. Wang Rong thereafter became a vassal of Zhu's.

=== Submission to Zhu Quanzhong ===
After Wang Rong agreed to become Zhu Quanzhong's vassal, another assistant of his, Zhang Ze (張澤), pointed out that Yiwu and Lulong remained affiliated with Hedong (as, despite the earlier formal break from Li Keyong, Liu Rengong and Li Keyong had assisted each other when under attack from Zhu), and that Chengde needed to continue to worry about a joint attack by all of those circuits. He suggested to Wang that Wang persuade Zhu to attack and conquer Yiwu and Lulong, so that thereafter Chengde would not need to worry about a Hedong attack in coordination with those circuits. Wang therefore had Zhou Shi submit that suggestion to Zhu. Zhu was pleased, and he sent his general Zhang Cunjing (張存敬) north to attack Lulong and Yichang first, capturing Ying (瀛州), Jing (景州), and Mo (莫州) (all in modern Cangzhou) Prefectures. However, after Zhang's path north toward You Prefecture was blocked by flooding, he attacked Yiwu to the west instead. After his troops dealt a crushing blow to Yiwu troops, Wang Gao fled. The remaining Yiwu soldiers supported Wang Chucun's brother Wang Chuzhi as Wang Gao's successor, and Wang Chuzhi subsequently persuaded Zhu to withdraw his troops by agreeing to be a vassal as well.

In 903, after the chancellor Cui Yin and Zhu jointly slaughtered all of the eunuchs in the imperial administration at Chang'an (an event that also marked the end of any independent imperial power, as Zhu controlled the emperor from this point on), an imperial edict ordered Wang to supply 50 eunuchs from the Chengde region to serve as new imperial servants in the palace, on account of the people in the region being considered kinder and gentler.

After Zhu forced Emperor Zhaozong to move the capital from Chang'an to Luoyang and then assassinated Emperor Zhaozong in 904, he forced Emperor Zhaozong's son and successor Emperor Ai to yield the throne to him in 907, ending the Tang dynasty and establishing a new Later Liang with Zhu as its Emperor Taizu. Wang Rong, whose Chengde Circuit had been renamed Wushun Circuit (武順) by this point (to observe naming taboo as Zhu's father was named Zhu Cheng (朱誠)), recognized Zhu as the new emperor.

== As Later Liang vassal ==
After Emperor Taizu took the throne, he created Wang Rong the Prince of Zhao. He also gave Wang Rong the honorary title of acting Taishi (太師). While Wushun and Yiwu, as per their traditions throughout the middle and late Tang dynasty, refused to submit tax revenues to the Later Liang imperial government, both Wang Rong and Wang Chuzhi often submitted tributes.

In 910, Wang Rong's mother Lady He died. Emperor Taizu sent imperial messengers to mourn her and issued an edict formally recalling Wang to active status from his mourning period. The nearby circuits also all sent mourners—including Hedong, whose military governor was Li Keyong's son and successor Li Cunxu the Prince of Jin, who was one of the few regional rulers who refused to recognize the Later Liang emperor's authority. When the Later Liang emissary happened to see the Jin emissary, he was surprised. After he returned to the Later Liang capital Kaifeng, he informed this to Emperor Taizu and indicated his suspicions that Wang Rong and Wang Chuzhi might be secretly aligning with Jin. As Luo Hongxin's son and successor at Weibo, Luo Shaowei the Prince of Ye, had recently died, Emperor Taizu wanted to use this opportunity to take effective control of Weibo, Wushun, and Yiwu. In winter 910, as it happened at that time that Liu Rengong's son and successor Liu Shouguang the Prince of Yan (who had seized Lulong after overthrowing his own father Liu Rengong and putting Liu Rengong under house arrest), who was a nominal Later Liang vassal as well, was posturing to attack Yiwu, Emperor Taizu sent his attendants Du Tingyin (杜廷隱) and Ding Yanhui (丁延徽) to take two corps of Weibo soldiers north to Wushun's Shen (深州) and Ji (冀州) (both in modern Hengshui, Hebei) Prefectures, claiming to be helping Wushun and Yiwu to defend against Liu Shouguang's attack. Wang Rong's general Shi Gongli (石公立), who was the defender of Shen Prefecture, suspected the Later Liang army's intentions, and therefore suggested to Wang that he should refuse the offer. Wang, not wanting to create any disputes between his army and the Later Liang imperial army, ordered Shi to vacate his troops from Shen. Soon thereafter, however, Du and Ding seized the controls of Shen and Ji Prefectures, respectively, slaughtered the remaining Wushun soldiers therein, and built up the defenses to wait for the arrival for the main Later Liang imperial forces commanded by the general Wang Jingren. Wang ordered Shi to attack the Later Liang forces, but could not recapture the two prefectures quickly. He thereafter sought emergency aid from both Liu Shouguang (who refused) and Li Cunxu (who agreed). Li Cunxu, with Wang Chuzhi also urging action from him, immediately launched his troops, with his general Zhou Dewei advancing first and he himself following, and headed for Zhen Prefecture to aid Wang Rong. From this point on, Wushun (which then changed its name back to Chengde) and Yiwu renounced their loyalty to Later Liang and restored their use of the Tang dynasty era name of Tianyou (which Jin, as well as two other states that did not recognize Later Liang imperial authority (Qi and Wu), also used), and in effect became completely independent polities.

== As ally to Jin ==
Meanwhile, though, Later Liang's Emperor Taizu, believing reports from his astrologers that for Wang Jingren to quickly advance would bring ill fortune, briefly recalled Wang Jingren, reordering him to advance toward Zhen Prefecture only after receiving reports that Jin forces had arrived at Zhao's Zhao Prefecture (趙州, in modern Shijiazhuang). After some initial minor skirmishes, the Jin/Zhao armies and the Later Liang army engaged at Boxiang (柏鄉, in modern Xingtai, Hebei) in spring 911). The battle was initially inconclusive, but after Wang Jingren made an ill-advised movement of part of his army to the rear, the Jin general Li Siyuan misled the Later Liang army into believing that Wang Jingren had fled, causing a major panic and allowing the JIn/Zhao forces to rout and slaughter most of the Later Liang army, including the elite Longxiang (龍驤) and Shenjie (神捷) armies. Hearing of Wang Jingren's defeat, Du Tingyin and Ding Yanhui abandoned Shen and Ji, taking the mature adults of the two prefectures with them and slaughtering the remaining population. Li Cunxu gave chase, going as far as briefly putting Weibo's capital Wei Prefecture (魏州) under siege, but, concerned that Liu Shouguang would attack him from the rear, withdrew and returned to Zhao. When he and Wang Rong subsequently met each other, they respectfully referred to each other as "uncle," and Li Cunxu promised to eventually give a daughter in marriage to Wang Rong's younger son Wang Zhaohui (王昭誨). Wang Rong also sent his adoptive son Wang Deming, along with 37 corps of the Zhao troops, to accompany Li Cunxu in his campaigns in the subsequent years.

Subsequently, Liu Shouguang, hearing of Later Liang's defeat, was considering claiming imperial title himself. He sent messengers to Wang Rong and Wang Chuzhi, suggesting that they should honor him as Shangfu (尚父, meaning "imperial father," a highly honorary title that was rarely bestowed and only on highly honored senior officials). When Wang Rong informed this to Li Cunxu, Li Cunxu, pursuant to suggestions that his generals made that making Liu more arrogant would cause him to push himself into doom, signed a joint declaration with Wang Rong, Wang Chuzhi, as well as three other military governors under Li Cunxu (Li Cunxu's cousin Li Sizhao, Zhou Dewei, and Song Yao (宋瑤)) honoring Liu as Shangfu. Faced with this, the Later Liang emperor tried to keep Liu at least nominally a vassal by offering him the title of Caifangshi (采訪使). Liu thereafter nevertheless declared himself the Emperor of Yan.

In 912, Jin forces under Zhou, Zhao forces under Wang Deming, and Yiwu forces under Cheng Yan (程巖), rendezvoused at Yi River (易水, flowing through modern Baoding) to commence a major attack on Liu's new empire of Yan. They quickly advanced to You Prefecture and put it under siege. Liu sought aid from Later Liang, and Emperor Taizu, despite Liu's self-declaration as emperor, took an army north to try to aid him. He captured the Zhao city of Zaoqiang (棗強, in modern Hengshui) and slaughtered the population. However, he then ran into minor ambushes by the Jin offices Shi Jiantang (史建瑭) and Li Sigong (李嗣肱), he wrongly believed that a major Jin attack was imminent and fled, abandoning any further thoughts of aiding Liu.

By winter 912, even though Zhou was still sieging You Prefecture, Wang Deming had returned to Zhao territory and was attacking Later Liang's Weibo Circuit territory. (By this point, Later Liang's Emperor Taizu, after returning to then-capital Luoyang, had been assassinated by his son Zhu Yougui, who declared himself emperor; Zhu Yougui was subsequently killed in a countercoup by his brother Zhu Youzhen, who then became emperor.) He was defeated by the Later Liang general Yang Shihou and, subsequently in spring 913, Yang further responded by advancing deep into Zhao territory, putting Xiabo (下博, in modern Shijiazhuang) under siege. Wang Rong had to seek emergency aid from Zhou, who sent Li Shaoheng (李紹衡) to rendezvous with Wang Deming to resist Later Liang troops, which then left Zhao territory. Later in the year, after Li Cunxu went to You Prefecture himself and defeated and captured Liu, he, at Wang Chuzhi's and Wang Rong's request, carried out a lengthy victory march through Yiwu and Chengde, before returning to the Jin capital Taiyuan to execute Liu Shouguang and Liu Rengong. (During Li Cunxu's visit to Zhen Prefecture on the victory march, at Wang Rong's request, Li Cunxu briefly released Liu Shouguang and Liu Rengong from their stockades and allowed Wang Rong to hold a feast with them as guests.) Meanwhile, Wang Rong's advisors pointed out that one of the titles that Later Liang had bestowed on him, Shangshu Ling (尚書令), was improper for him to hold since Zhao was still theoretically Tang territory and no Tang official had dared to hold that title since the great early Tang emperor Taizong had held it while he was the Prince of Qin. At those advisors' suggestion, Wang offered the title to Li Cunxu instead. Li Cunxu accepted it, and subsequently began to organize an acting imperial government pursuant to Emperor Taizong's precedent while he was Prince of Qin.

In summer 914, Wang Rong and Zhou jointly attacked Xing Prefecture, but after initial setbacks against Yang, withdrew.

== Fall and death ==
As the years went by, it was said that Wang Rong took the loyalty of the Zhao people for granted, and he lived luxuriously, building many manors and gardens for his enjoyment. (While his mother Lady He was alive, she curbed his wasteful tendencies, but after her death, those tendencies grew more and more.) He did not pay attention to the governance of his state, and he entrusted those matters to his staff members, particularly the commander of the army Li Ai (李藹) and the eunuch Li Honggui (李弘規). He also spent much time in worshipping Buddhas and Taoist gods, as well as alchemy. The expenditures increased greatly, and the people began to suffer under heavy tax burdens. In particular, he liked visiting his manor in the mountains to the west of Zhen Prefecture's main city; on his visits, he often took around 10,000 men with him to guard him, further exacerbating the expenditure situation and tiring out the army. Meanwhile, wanting Wang Deming to serve the commander of his personal guards, he recalled Wang Deming from his service under Li Cunxu against Later Liang, and replaced Wang with Fu Xi (符習).

In winter 920, when Wang Rong was again visiting the mountains, Li Honggui pointed out that by frequently spending time away from headquarters, he was exposing himself to the risk of mutiny, and also was not showing enough concerns to Li Cunxu's war efforts against Later Liang, which Li Cunxu was personally leading. Wang initially agreed to return to Zhen Prefecture, but another eunuch, Shi Ximeng (石希蒙), accused Li Honggui of falsely alarming Wang. Wang agreed, and therefore decided to stay at the manor without stating when he would return to Zhen Prefecture. Li Honggui thereafter had the officer Su Hanheng (蘇漢衡) take Wang Rong's guard soldiers into the manor to state their grievances. When Wang would not listen, the soldiers killed Shi. In anger and fear, Wang immediately returned to his headquarters at Zhen Prefecture. That night, he had Wang Zhaozuo and Wang Deming slaughter Li Honggui and Li Ai, as well as their clans. Also killed were tens of other families of Li Honggui's and Li Ai's associates, including Su's. Many of Su's associates were arrested, and the army fell into a sense of terror.

After Li Honggui's and Li Ai's death, Wang Rong entrusted the affairs of the state to Wang Zhaozuo. Wang Zhaozuo, however, alienated the soldiers by being arrogant and harsh, including killing many of Li Honggui's associates. 500 soldiers who were commanded by Li Honggui considered deserting, but could not resolve to do so. At that time, it happened that Wang Rong was awarding army soldiers with cash, but Wang Rong, despising the guards for killing Shi, ordered that the guards receive no rewards, causing the guards to be further terrified. Wang Deming, who at this point was considering turning against his adoptive father, falsely informed the guards that Wang Rong was planning to slaughter them all, further drawing their anger and fear.

One night in spring 921, the guard soldiers were feasting. One of them stated that he knew what Wang Deming was thinking, and that they should rebel. The other soldiers agreed, and they entered the headquarters. At that time, Wang Rong happened to be making sacrifices in a Taoist ceremony, and two soldiers rushed in and cut off his head. The officer Zhang Youshun (張友順) then went to Wang Deming's mansion, urging him to take over the circuit. Wang Deming agreed. He changed his name back to his birth name of Zhang Wenli, and then slaughtered Wang Rong's clan, including Wang Zhaozuo, only sparing Wang Zhaozuo's wife (the Later Liang emperor Zhu Youzhen's sister, who had been given the title Princess Puning), but submitted a petition to Li Cunxu, pledging loyalty. Li Cunxu's initial reaction was wanting to attack Zhang, but his staff members persuaded him to commission Zhang the acting military governor of Chengde to avoid having to fight wars on two fronts, so Li Cunxu initially did so. However, after Zhang, himself worried about Li Cunxu's intentions, made overtures to not only Zhu Youzhen but also the Khitan Emperor Taizu, Li Cunxu, also with Fu's urging, declared a general campaign against Zhang. Zhang, upon hearing of Li Cunxu's declaration, died in fear, and was succeeded by his son Zhang Chujin. Zhang Chujin initially was able to hold out against Jin forces, but by fall 922 Zhen Prefecture had fallen. Zhang Wenli's family was slaughtered. Meanwhile, Wang Rong's body, which had been left unburied in a burned mansion, was recovered by Wang Rong's former subordinates and buried properly. (Wang Zhaohui had escaped the slaughter after being hidden and protected by some soldiers loyal to Wang Rong, but did not reveal his identity until years later, during the reign of Li Siyuan, who succeeded Li Cunxu; he married Fu's daughter and would eventually have a civil service career that lasted at least to the time of Later Zhou.)

== Personal information ==
- Father
  - Wang Jingchong (Prince Zhongmu of Changshan)
- Mother
  - Lady He, honored as the Lady Dowager of Wei (died 910)
- Children
  - Wang Zhaozuo (王昭祚) (killed by Zhang Wenli 921)
  - Wang Zhaohui (王昭誨) (born 912)
- Adoptive Child
  - Wang Deming (王德明), né Zhang Wenli (張文禮)

== Notes and references ==
- Old Book of Tang, vol. 142.
- New Book of Tang, vol. 211.
- History of the Five Dynasties, vol. 54.
- New History of the Five Dynasties, vol. 39.
- Zizhi Tongjian, vols. 255, 256, 258, 259, 260, 261, 262, 263, 266, 267, 268, 269, 271.

Chinese nobility
New creation	Prince of Zhao; 907–921	Dynasty destroyed
Preceded by Zhu Wen	Ruler of China (Shijiazhuang/Hengshui region) (de jure); 910–921	Succeeded by Li Cunxu (Prince of JIn)
Preceded by Wang Jingchong	Ruler of China (Shijiazhuang/Hengshui region) (de facto); 883–921	Succeeded by Zhang Wenli
