= Li Cunxu =

Emperor of Later Tang from 923 to 926

Emperor Zhuangzong of Later Tang 後唐莊宗

Emperor of the Later Tang dynasty
- Reign: May 13, 923 – May 15, 926
- Successor: Li Siyuan

Prince of Jin
- Reign: February 23, 908 – May 13, 923
- Predecessor: Li Keyong
- Born: December 2, 885; Ying County, Yingzhou (modern Ying County, Shanxi)
- Died: May 15, 926; Luoyang
- Burial: Yong Mausoleum (雍陵; in modern Xin'an County, Henan)
Full name
- Family name: Lǐ (李); Given name: Cúnxù (存勗)
Era name and dates
- Tóngguāng (同光): May 13, 923 – June 11, 926
Posthumous name
- Emperor Guāngshèng Shénmǐn Xiào (光聖神閔孝皇帝)
Temple name
- Zhuāngzōng (莊宗)
- House: Li (Zhuye)
- Dynasty: Former Jin (908–923); Later Tang (923–926)

Emperor Zhuangzong of Later Tang
- Chinese: 後唐莊宗
- Literal meaning: "Solemn Ancestor of the Later Tang"
Transcriptions
Standard Mandarin
- Hanyu Pinyin: Hòu Táng Zhuāngzōng

Emperor Zhuangzong of Later Tang (Chinese: 後唐莊宗), personal name Li Cunxu (Chinese: 李存朂 or 李存勗 or 李存勖; pinyin: Lǐ Cúnxù), nickname Yazi (亞子), stage name Li Tianxia (李天下), was the second ruling prince of the Former Jin dynasty (r. 908–923) who later became the founding emperor of the Later Tang dynasty (r. 923–926) during the Five Dynasties and Ten Kingdoms period of Chinese history. He was the son of Li Keyong, an ethnic Shatuo Jiedushi of the Tang dynasty.

Li Cunxu was considered one of the most militarily capable rulers of the Five Dynasties and Ten Kingdoms period. When he succeeded his father Li Keyong as the Prince of Jin, the Former Jin had been weakened in the late years of Li Keyong's rule and not considered capable of posing a military threat to its archrival to the south, Later Liang, whose founding emperor Zhu Quanzhong had seized the Tang throne. Li Cunxu carefully rebuilt the Former Jin state, using a series of conquests and alliances to take over most of the territory north of the Yellow River, before starting a lengthy campaign against Later Liang.

Li Cunxu conquered the Later Liang dynasty in 923 and proclaimed himself emperor of the Later Tang, which he referred to as the "Restored Tang". As a part of "restoring Tang", the capital was moved back to the old Tang eastern capital of Luoyang. As with all of the other dynasties of the Five Dynasties, Later Tang was a short-lived regime lasting only thirteen years. Li Cunxu himself lived only three years after the founding of the dynasty, having been killed during an officer's rebellion led by Guo Congqian (郭從謙) in 926. He was succeeded by his adoptive brother Li Siyuan (Emperor Mingzong).

== Background ==
Li Cunxu was born in 885, at Jinyang (i.e., Taiyuan), during the reign of Emperor Zhaozong of Tang. His father was the late-Tang dynasty major warlord Li Keyong the military governor of Hedong Circuit (河東, headquartered in modern Taiyuan, Shanxi). His mother was Li Keyong's concubine Lady Cao. He was Li Keyong's oldest biological son.

In 895, when Li Keyong was on an (eventually successful) campaign against the warlords Wang Xingyu the military governor of Jingnan Circuit (靜難, headquartered in modern Xianyang, Shaanxi), Li Maozhen the military governor of Fengxiang Circuit (鳳翔, headquartered in modern Baoji, Shaanxi), and Han Jian the military governor of Zhenguo Circuit (鎮國, headquartered in modern Weinan, Shaanxi)—who, earlier, had entered the capital Chang'an and executed the chancellors Wei Zhaodu and Li Xi over Emperor Zhaozong's objections—Li Keyong sent Li Cunxu to pay homage to the emperor.

Emperor Zhaozong, upon seeing Li Cunxu's appearance, caressed him and stated, "You, son, will be a pillar for the state. Please be faithful to the imperial house." After Li Keyong defeated the three warlords (killing Wang and forcing Li Maozhen and Han to nominally resubmit to the emperor), Li Cunxu was given the honorific title of acting Sikong (司空) and made the prefect of Xi Prefecture (隰州, in modern Linfen, Shanxi), and later successively the prefect of Fen (汾州) and Jin (晉州) Prefectures (both in modern Linfen), but as he did not report to those prefectures, the titles were honorary. He was said to understand music, and often sang or danced before his father. He had a rudimentary understanding of the Spring and Autumn Annals. When he grew older, he became capable at riding and archery.

Li Cunxu was said to be intelligent, brave, and alert even in his youth. In or around 902, seeing his father's distress at years of losses against archrival Zhu Quanzhong the military governor of Xuanwu Circuit (宣武, headquartered in modern Kaifeng, Henan), he pointed out that his father's public display of distress would merely distress the troops and the people as well, and that it was better to lie low and wait for Zhu to make a mistake before trying to react, allowing the troops and the people to rest for the time. He also spoke to Li Keyong about what he saw as the issue of the ethnically Shatuo soldiers pillaging the civilian populace—although Li Keyong was unwilling to curb the soldiers' behaviors at that time, pointing out that if he did, the soldiers might scatter and be unable to be gathered again.

In 906, Zhu was on campaign against another major warlord, Liu Rengong the military governor of Lulong Circuit (盧龍, headquartered in modern Beijing), and he put Liu Rengong's son Liu Shouwen the military governor of Yichang Circuit (義昌, headquartered in modern Cangzhou, Hebei) under siege at Yichang's capital Cang Prefecture (滄州). Liu Rengong sought aid from Li Keyong—whom he had previously rebelled against and thereafter became independent from. Li Keyong, bearing that grudge, initially refused to aid Liu. Li Cunxu pointed out that Zhu had become so strong at that point that nearly all of the other warlords had submitted to him as vassals, and that Hedong and Lulong were two of the few remaining holdouts.

He advocated aiding Liu to stop Zhu's expansion, while at time helping Li Keyong gain a reputation for magnanimity. Under Li Cunxu's advocacy, Li Keyong agreed, and requested Liu send troops to him to jointly attack Zhu's possession Zhaoyi Circuit (昭義, headquartered in modern Changzhi, Shanxi) to open a second front. Liu did so. Subsequent, when Li Keyong attacked Zhaoyi's capital Lu Prefecture (潞州), Zhaoyi's military governor Ding Hui, who had secretly resented Zhu for having killed Emperor Zhaozong in 904, surrendered Zhaoyi to Li Keyong, forcing Zhu to abandon his campaign against Liu.

In 907, Zhu had Emperor Zhaozong's son and successor Emperor Ai yield the throne to him, ending Tang and starting a new Later Liang as its emperor. He claimed to be the proper ruler for all of the former Tang realm, but Li Keyong, as well as Li Maozhen, Yang Wo the military governor of Huainan Circuit (淮南, headquartered in modern Yangzhou, Jiangsu), and Wang Jian the military governor of Xichuan Circuit (西川, headquartered in modern Chengdu, Sichuan), refused to recognize him as emperor, effectively becoming sovereigns of their own realms (Jin, Qi, Hongnong, and Former Shu, respectively). Zhu thereafter sent his general Kang Huaizhen (康懷貞) to put Li Cunxu's adoptive cousin Li Sizhao, whom Li Keyong had made the military governor of Zhaoyi, under siege at Lu. Kang built walls and trenches around Lu to cut off communications with the outside, and subsequent relief forces that Li Keyong sent under Zhou Dewei's command, while having some minor successes against Later Liang forces, were unable to lift the siege. By spring 908, Li Keyong had fallen seriously ill. He entrusted Li Cunxu, whom he designated as his heir, to his brother Li Kening, the eunuch monitor Zhang Chengye, Li Cunxu's adoptive brother Li Cunzhang, the officer Wu Gong (吳珙), and the secretary general Lu Zhi (盧質), while repeatedly stating to Li Cunxu that the immediate urgency after his death would be to rescue Li Sizhao. He then died and was succeeded as the Prince of Jin by Li Cunxu.

== As Prince of Jin ==
=== Initial consolidation of power ===
After Li Keyong's death, Li Kening initially took over the discipline of the army, and no one dared to create a disturbance. By contrast, the officers and the soldiers did not then respect the young (then 22) Li Cunxu, and they were constantly commenting about him. Li Cunxu, in fear, offered the command of the army to Li Kening, but Li Kening declined, pointing out that he was Li Keyong's lawful heir. Under Li Kening's and Zhang Chengye's insistence, Li Cunxu took the titles of Prince of Jin and military governor of Hedong.

Many of Li Keyong's adoptive sons who served as officers, however, were older and more accomplished militarily than Li Cunxu, and they did not respect him; many refused to meet him to pay homage, and some refused to bow to him. One of those, Li Cunhao (李存顥), tried to persuade Li Kening to take over the command himself, but Li Kening refused Li Cunhao's overture, going as far as to threaten him with execution. However, Li Cunhao and several other adoptive sons sent their wives to persuade Li Kening's wife Lady Meng. Lady Meng agreed with their idea, and therefore urged Li Kening to go with the idea, causing Li Kening's resolve to support Li Cunxu to be shaken. Further, he was also encountering policy disagreements with Zhang and Li Cunzhang and argued with them frequently. He thereafter killed an officer, Li Cunzhi (李存質), without Li Cunxu's approval, and also requested to be made the military governor of Datong Circuit (大同, headquartered in modern Datong, Shanxi). Li Cunxu agreed.

Despite Li Cunxu's agreement with Li Kening, the conspiracy around Li Kening continued. Li Cunhao specifically planned, with Li Kening's understanding, to seize Li Cunxu when Li Cunxu would visit Li Kening's mansion, deliver Li Cunxu and his mother Lady Dowager Cao to the Later Liang emperor, and take over Hedong Circuit. Li Kening met the officer Shi Jingrong (史敬鎔) to try to get Shi to join the plot and to surveil Li Cunxu. Shi pretended to agree, and then informed the plot to Li Cunxu. Li Cunxu met with Lady Dowager Cao and Zhang and initially offered to resign to try to avoid a conflict, but Zhang persuaded him to act against Li Kening. Zhang summoned Li Cunzhang, Wu Gong, as well as the officers Li Cunjing (李存敬) and Zhu Shouyin to prepare against Li Kening.

On March 25, 908, Li Cunxu held a feast at his own mansion, and all the high-level officers attended. At the feast, soldiers that Li Cunxu had previously hidden seized Li Kening and Li Cunhao, and then executed them.

Meanwhile, the crisis of Lu being under siege continued. However, believing that Lu would fall by itself without aid from the outside in light of Li Keyong's death (particularly because Li Cunxu withdrew Zhou Dewei from the area back to Taiyuan for some time), Zhu Quanzhong left the siege, leaving his generals to continue the siege against Lu. Li Cunxu decided to lead the army himself to try to lift the siege. With he himself attacking the Later Liang forces from one side and Zhou from the other, the surprised Later Liang forces collapsed, ending the siege on Lu.

Li Cunxu thereafter instituted policies that, during the next several years, gradually let Jin regain its strength from the nadir late in the Li Keyong years. As described by the Song dynasty historian Sima Guang in the Zizhi Tongjian:

He ordered the prefectures and counties to recommend people who were good and talented; he also deposed the greedy and the cruel, relaxed the tax burden, comforted the weak and the poor, corrected injustice and excesses, such that the realm became well-governed. As Hedong was a small territory that lacked resources for military recruitments, he strengthened the training for the soldiers. He ordered that cavalry soldiers walk on marches, and that, without seeing the enemy, they not mount their horses. Once orders and duties were distributed, all soldiers were to follow them and not exceed their bounds, not exchange duties, not linger in places, and not avoid dangers. Whenever the soldiers were to be divided into several prongs of attack, they were to rendezvous at the appointed time, and that if they were late for more than 15 minutes, they would be executed. This was how he was able to eventually conquer the territory east of the Taihang Mountains and occupy the lands south of the Yellow River—he had well-disciplined soldiers.

Li Cunxu also began to exercise imperial powers, in the name of the Tang emperor (even though there was no Tang emperor at that time any more)—an authority that Emperor Zhaozong had previously granted Li Keyong, but which Li Keyong never exercised. He trusted Zhang Chengye greatly, honoring him as an older brother.

For some time thereafter, Li Cunxu did not wage major campaigns, although he did involve himself in the war between Liu Shouwen and his younger brother Liu Shouguang by aiding Liu Shouguang, after Liu Shouguang had overthrown Liu Rengong and taken over Lulong Circuit. (Liu Shouguang eventually captured Liu Shouwen at the Battle of Jisu, uniting Lulong and Yichang under his control.) He also jointly attacked Later Liang with Li Maozhen's Qi state after the major Later Liang general Liu Zhijun submitted to Qi.

Li Cunxu's major opportunity to assert himself against Later Liang came in late 910. Zhu Quanzhong had come to suspect his vassals Wang Rong the Prince of Zhao, who controlled Wushun Circuit (武順, headquartered in modern Shijiazhuang, Hebei), and Wang Chuzhi the military governor of Yiwu Circuit (義武, headquartered in modern Baoding, Hebei), of potentially turning against him, and therefore decided to seize the circuits by trick. As Liu Shouguang was threatening Yiwu at that time, he launched an army north, pretending to be helping Yiwu and Wushun in defending against a potential Liu Shouguang attack, but then seized Wushun's Shen (深州) and Ji (冀州) Prefectures (both in modern Hengshui, Hebei) and slaughtered Wushun's garrison at those prefectures. Wang Rong, surprised by this turn of events, immediately sought aid from both Li Cunxu and Liu Shouguang. Liu Shouguang refused, but Li Cunxu launched armies commanded by Zhou and later, himself.

In spring 911, a joint Jin/Zhao/Yiwu army crushed the Later Liang army, commanded by the major Later Liang general Wang Jingren, at Boxiang (柏鄉, in modern Xingtai, Hebei). In the aftermaths of the victory, Li Cunxu decided to advance further, and he briefly put Wei Prefecture (魏州, in modern Handan, Hebei), the capital of Later Liang's important Tianxiong Circuit (天雄), under siege. However, apprehensive that a major Later Liang army under the command of the major general Yang Shihou was approaching, and more apprehensive that Liu Shouguang (who by this point was making noise about joining forces with him but demanding a leadership role in the army) might create trouble for him, he soon gave up the siege on Wei, ending the confrontation with Later Liang for the time being. From this point on, Zhao and Yiwu became effectively independent polities, but in close alliance with Jin, all still using the Tang era name of Tianyou (天佑) to signify opposition against Later Liang.

=== Conquest of Yan ===
Meanwhile, Liu Shouguang, believing himself to be strong enough to declare himself emperor, tried to persuade Wang Rong and Wang Chuzhi to honor him as Shangfu (尚父, "imperial father"). Li Cunxu, in order to further encourage Liu into megalomania to be able to defeat him later, thereafter signed a joint petition with Wang Rong, Wang Chuzhi, as well as three other governors under his command—Li Sizhao, Zhou Dewei (whom he had made the military governor of Zhenwu Circuit (振武, headquartered in modern Datong)) and Song Yao (宋瑤) the defender of Tiande Circuit (天德, headquartered in modern Hohhot, Inner Mongolia)—offering Liu the title of Shangfu. Zhu Quanzhong, while knowing that Liu was inflating himself, tried to keep him nominally in the fold by naming him the surveyor of the circuits north of the Yellow River.

All of these honors offered to him, however, did not stop Liu from claiming the title he actually wanted, and in fall 911, he declared himself the emperor of a new state of Yan. He also launched an army to attack Yiwu. When Wang Chuzhi sought aid, Li Cunxu sent Zhou to rendezvous with the Zhao and Yiwu armies, to jointly attack Yan. Zhou was able to advance deep within Yan territory. Li Cunxu himself later also headed to the Yan front. (In his absence, Zhu tried to avenge himself by attacking Jin and Zhao, but his army was tricked into collapsing on itself due to posturing by the Jin generals Li Cunshen (Li Cunxu's adoptive brother), Shi Jiantang (史建瑭) and Li Sigong (李嗣肱) (pretending that a major Jin army was about to attack the Later Liang army under Zhu), and eventually gave up on the idea of aiding Liu.)

While the Yan campaign was going on, in late 912, Zhu Quanzhong was assassinated by his son Zhu Yougui the Prince of Ying, who thereafter declared himself the emperor of Later Liang. The major Later Liang general Zhu Youqian the military governor of Huguo Circuit (護國, headquartered in modern Yuncheng, Shanxi), refused to submit to Zhu Yougui, and instead submitted to Jin, seeking Li Cunxu's aid. When Zhu Yougui subsequently sent the general Kang Huaizhen (康懷貞) to attack Zhu Youqian, Li Cunxu went to Zhu Youqian's aid and repelled Kang's attack, forcing Kang to withdraw. (Zhu Youqian would subsequently return to the Later Liang fold after, in 913, Zhu Yougui's brother Zhu Youzhen the Prince of Jun overthrew Zhu Yougui in a countercoup and became emperor, but would yet later revert to Jin.)

By summer 913, Zhou had put Yan's capital You Prefecture (幽州) under siege. Liu, desperate, claimed that if Li Cunxu himself came to You, he would surrender. When Li Cunxu arrived, however, he did not do so, despite Li Cunxu's assurance that his life would be spared if he surrendered. Li Cunxu subsequently intensified the siege, and You fell. Liu fled with his wives and children, but was subsequently captured. Li Cunxu took him and his family, including his father Liu Rengong (whom he had put under house arrest) back to Taiyuan, and then executed them there. He commissioned Zhou as the military governor of Lulong and added Yan territory to his own. In light of his victory, Wang Rong and Wang Chuzhi offered the title Shangshu Ling (尚書令) to him—a title that no Tang subject had dared to accept because it had been at one point held by Tang's second emperor Emperor Taizong. After initially declining, Li Cunxu accepted the title, and also established a provisional central government, exercising imperial powers in the manner that Emperor Taizong did (while he was still the Prince of Qin under his father, Tang's founder Emperor Gaozu).

=== Initial campaign against Later Liang ===
After Yan's destruction, with the fear of a Yan attack no longer in sight, Li Cunxu decided to commence his campaign against archrival Later Liang, in conjunction with Zhao and Yiwu. His initial attack toward Later Liang's Tianxiong Circuit in late 914 was repelled by Yang Shihou (who was then the military governor of Tianxiong).

However, Yang's death in 915 would bring a major opportunity for Jin. Zhu Youzhen—who had changed his name to Zhu Zhen by this point—was apprehensive of the power that the Tianxiong army had, and decided to weaken it by dividing in into two circuits, each with three of the six prefectures that Tianxiong previously possessed, with a smaller Tianxiong Circuit headquartered still at its long-time capital Wei Prefecture (魏州) with He Delun (賀德倫) as its military governor, and a new Zhaode Circuit (昭德) headquartered at Xiang Prefecture (相州, in modern Handan) with Zhang Yun (張筠) as its military governor. The Tianxiong army was apprehensive and angry about the division, and therefore mutinied under the leadership of the officer Zhang Yan (張彥), taking He Delun hostage. When Zhu refused to meet Zhang Yan's demands that the division be cancelled, Zhang Yan forced He Delun to write Li Cunxu, offering to surrender Tianxiong to him. Li Cunxu subsequently arrived at Tianxiong and, after killing Zhang Yan for his violent behavior, assumed the military governorship of Tianxiong himself and incorporated into Jin. Subsequent Later Liang counterattacks commanded by the generals Liu Xun and Wang Tan (王檀) were defeated by Li Cunxu and his generals. (Tianxiong subsequently became a major source of human and material resources for Li Cunxu's campaigns.) Tianxiong's fall to Jin left the other Later Liang circuits north of the Yellow River (Baoyi (保義, headquartered in modern Xingtai, Hebei, which Jin later renamed Anguo (安國), and Shunhua (順化, i.e., Yichang, which Later Liang had taken during the Jin campaign against Yan and renamed, and which Jin later renamed Henghai (橫海)) isolated, and by late 916, they had fallen to Jin as well, leaving a single city (黎陽, in modern Hebi, Henan) north of the Yellow River that was still held by Later Liang.

However, Jin was soon challenged by the Khitan Empire to the north as well, with Khitan's Emperor Taizu (Yelü Abaoji) launching a major attack on Lulong in 917, putting You Prefecture under siege. While Li Cunxu and his generals (his adoptive brothers Li Siyuan and Li Cunshen, as well as Yan Bao (閻寶)) subsequently repelled the Khitan attack, Lulong's vulnerability to Khitan attacks had been exposed, and in the future, there would be recurrent Khitan incursions against Lulong.

In winter 917, Li Cunxu, believing that he was in shape to destroy Later Liang once and for all, gathered all of his major generals, preparing to cross the then-frozen Yellow River and attack Later Liang's capital Daliang. However, he then apparently changed his mind, wanting to destroy the main Later Liang army, which was then under the command of He Gui, first, and he spent several months pillaging the Later Liang territory on the Yellow River. Around new year 919, the two armies met at Huliu Slope (胡柳陂, in modern Heze, Shandong), just south of the Yellow River. Disregarding Zhou Dewei's advice that he should wear out the Later Liang forces first before engaging them, Li Cunxu ordered a direct attack, which was disastrous for the Jin army, with Zhou killed in battle. During the initial rout, however, Li Cunxu took position on a hill and used it to counterattack, inflicting much losses against Later Liang, fighting the battle to an essential draw. It was said that both Jin and Later Liang lost two thirds of their soldiers that day, and both were weakened for quite some time.

=== Integration of Zhao and Yiwu into Jin ===
At the same time, a crisis was developing within Jin's ally Zhao. Wang Rong, in his old age, was described to be superstitious and spending much efforts on immortality, not attending to the affairs of his state, and spending much time at his vacation estate. He also greatly trusted the eunuch Shi Ximeng (石希蒙), who encouraged him in such tendencies. In late 920, when he remained for months at his vacation estate and refused to return to Zhao's capital Zhen Prefecture (鎮州), his military commander Li Ai (李藹) and eunuch Li Honggui (李弘規) felt compelled to mobilize soldiers to force him to return—and the soldiers, in the disturbance, killed Shi. Wang subsequently killed Li Ai and Li Honggui, entrusting the authority of the state to his son and heir Wang Zhaozuo and adoptive son Wang Deming. The remaining soldiers feared that they would also be punished, and, in spring 921, they mutinied and slaughtered Wang Rong and his family, supporting Wang Deming (who then changed his name back to his birth name of Zhang Wenli) as their leader.

Zhang offered to submit as a vassal to Li Cunxu, and Li Cunxu, while greatly saddened by Wang Rong's death, initially commissioned him as the acting military governor of Chengde Circuit (成德, i.e., Zhao). However, Zhang himself was apprehensive of how Li Cunxu viewed him, and therefore made overtures to both Later Liang's emperor Zhu Zhen (premised on the fact that he spared Wang Zhaozuo's wife, who was a sister to Zhu Zhen and who carried the title of Princess Puning), and Khitan's Emperor Taizu. Zhu, however, was dissuaded from aiding Zhang by his associates, despite his chancellor Jing Xiang's advocacy for doing so. Eventually, Li Cunxu, encouraged by the Zhao general Fu Xi (符習), who commanded the Zhao detachment in Li Cunxu's army and who wanted to avenge the Wang family, declared a general campaign against Zhang. Zhang died in shock when the campaign was declared, but under the leadership of his son Zhang Chujin, the Chengde mutineers resisted.

Meanwhile, a similar crisis was developing at another Jin ally, Yiwu Circuit. Wang Chuzhi feared that if Jin conquered Zhao lands, Yiwu would inevitably also be incorporated into Jin territory, and therefore advocated pardoning Zhang Wenli. When his proposal was rebuffed by Li Cunxu, Wang Chuzhi decided to secretly make an overture to Khitan's Emperor Taizu to invite him to invade Jin, through his son Wang Yu (王郁), who was then a Jin officer on the Khitan border. Wang Yu agreed, but extracted a promise from Wang Chuzhi that he be made heir, displacing Wang Chuzhi's adoptive son Wang Du, whom Wang Chuzhi had designated as heir. However, the Yiwu officers did not want to see a Khitan invasion, and Wang Du used this sentiment to lead a coup against Wang Chuzhi. He put Wang Chuzhi and Wang Chuzhi's wife under house arrest, while slaughtering Wang Chuzhi's descendants at Yiwu's capital Ding Prefecture (定州). He then reported what happened to Li Cunxu. Li Cunxu commissioned him as the acting military governor of Yiwu, thus effectively turning Yiwu into a vassal.

Subsequently, the Khitan emperor invaded, enticed by Wang Yu's description of Chengde and Yiwu as rich lands that he could pillage. Li Cunxu, leaving his generals to besiege Zhen Prefecture, personally led an army to confront the Khitan army. He defeated the Khitan army, forcing Emperor Taizu's withdrawal and leaving the Chengde mutineers without outside allies.

Despite the seeming inevitability of success, the Jin forces suffered several major losses against the Chengde mutineers:

- Shi Jiantang was killed in battle.
- Yan Bao was defeated and forced to retreat. (Yan subsequently died in shame.)
- Li Sizhao suffered a mortal injury and died from it.
- Li Cunxu's adoptive brother Li Cunjin was also killed in battle.

Meanwhile, Li Cunshen and Li Siyuan fought off a Later Liang army commanded by Dai Siyuan, which tried to take advantage of the situation. Li Cunxu subsequently commissioned Li Cunshen to attack the Chengde mutineers, and Zhen fell to him. Li Cunxu killed Zhang Chujin and his brothers, and incorporated Chengde into his territory.

Li Sizhao's death, however, created another crisis for Li Cunxu, who, at this time, was preparing to claim imperial title. After Li Sizhao's death, his sons, against Li Cunxu's orders to have Li Sizhao's casket escorted to Taiyuan for burial, instead took it back to Lu Prefecture. Thereafter, Li Sizhao's son Li Jitao seized power at Zhaoyi, and Li Cunxu, not wanting to create another disturbance, changed the name of the circuit to Anyi (安義) (to observe naming taboo for Li Sizhao) and commissioned Li Jitao as the acting military governor. However, subsequently, fearing that Li Cunxu would act against him, particularly when Li Cunxu recalled the eunuch monitor Zhang Juhan and the secretary general Ren Huan to his provisional imperial government, Li Jitao submitted Anyi to Later Liang. Zhu Zhen was very pleased, and renamed the circuit to Kuangyi (匡義), commissioning Li Jitao as its military governor.

== As Emperor of Later Tang ==
=== Conquest of Later Liang ===
Shortly after, in spring 923, Li Cunxu declared himself emperor of Tang—using the Tang name for his state to claim legitimate succession from Tang—at Wei Prefecture. This Tang is known in historiography as "Later Tang". He renamed Wei to Xingtang Municipality (興唐) and made it his temporary capital.

At that time, though, the outlook for the new Later Tang state was not a positive one—as it was facing the reality of regular Khitan incursions that laid Lulong bare and Anyi's recent rebellion. However, at that time, the Later Liang officer Lu Shunmi (盧順密) defected to Later Tang, revealing that Later Liang's Tianping Circuit (天平, headquartered in modern Tai'an, Shandong)—south of the Yellow River and deep behind Later Liang lines—was not well-defended and could be taken. Li Cunxu believed that this was an opportunity to change the tide of the war, and put Li Siyuan, who supported the plan, in charge of an army to launch a surprise attack on Tianping's capital Yun Prefecture (鄆州). Li Siyuan was shortly thereafter able to capture Yun in a surprise attack.

Shocked by Yun's fall, Zhu Zhen relieved Dai Siyuan, who was the military governor of Tianping but who was then commanding the main Later Liang army against Later Tang, of his command, and, at Jing Xiang's recommendation, commissioned Wang Yanzhang to replace him. Wang quickly attacked and captured the border fort Desheng (德勝, in modern Puyang, Henan), intending to use it to cut off the supply line between Later Tang proper and Yun. However, his subsequent battles against Li Cunxu himself were indecisive; further, Wang's commission caused much apprehension in the hearts of Zhu's close associates—his brother-in-law Zhao Yan and four brothers/cousins of his late wife Consort Zhang—as Wang had long despised what he saw as their wickedness. Zhao and the Zhangs thus defamed him before Zhu, who then removed him and replaced him with Duan Ning. Meanwhile, Zhu also destroyed the Yellow River levee at Hua Prefecture (滑州, in modern Anyang, Henan), causing a flood area, believing that it would impede further Later Tang attacks.

Duan prepared an ambitious plan for a four-prong counterattack against Later Tang:

1. Dong Zhang would head toward Taiyuan.
2. Huo Yanwei would head toward Zhen Prefecture.
3. Wang and Consort Zhang's brother Zhang Hanjie (張漢傑) would head toward Yun Prefecture.
4. Duan himself, along with Du Yanqiu, would confront Li Cunxu.

However, the Later Liang officer Kang Yanxiao, at this junction, defected to Later Tang, revealing Duan's plan to the Later Tang emperor and pointing out that the plan left the Later Liang capital Daliang defenseless, and pointing out that Wang's and Zhang Hanjie's army was the weakest of the four prongs and could easily be defeated. Li Cunxu decided to take the risky move himself, and advanced to Yun to join forces with Li Siyuan, and then engage Wang and Zhang Hanjie. He defeated them, capturing both Wang and Zhang Hanjie at Zhongdu (中都, in modern Jining, Shandong), and then headed directly toward the defenseless Daliang. With Duan's army trapped north of the Yellow River and unable to come to his rescue, Zhu saw the situation as hopeless. He ordered his general Huangfu Lin (皇甫麟) to kill him; Huangfu did, and then committed suicide himself. This thus ended Later Liang. Li Cunxu subsequently entered Daliang and claimed all of Later Liang territory.

=== Governance at Luoyang ===
Li Cunxu set his capital at Luoyang. He also notified the other main independent states—Wu and Former Shu—of his victory over Later Liang, causing much fear in both of those states. Also shocked by his victory was Qi's prince Li Maozhen, who, in fear that he might be the next target, submitted as a vassal. Li Cunxu accepted Li Maozhen's submission and created him as the Prince of Qin. After Li Maozhen's death in 924, Li Cunxu allowed his son Li Jiyan to inherit Fengxiang Circuit as military governor, but did not bestow Li Jiyan a princely title, and this was thus viewed as the end of Qi as an independent state. The Later Liang military governors all submitted to him, and in effect, he had merged the two states. (That included Li Jitao, although, after he later discovered the Li Jitao was still planning to control his realm independently, he put Li Jitao to death.

However, despite being a capable general, Li Cunxu was not capable at governance. He, and particularly his favorite consort Empress Liu, whom he created empress, were gathering wealth to be stored despite the burden it was creating for the people. He also alienated his army by trusting performers (as he himself had a passion for performing) and eunuchs, such that he made three performers prefectural prefects, while soldiers who had followed him for hundreds of battles were not similarly rewarded. This phenomenon was also observed as such by Wu's emissary to Later Tang, Lu Ping (盧蘋), and a former Later Liang warlord, Gao Jixing the military governor of Jingnan Circuit (荊南, headquartered in modern Jingzhou, Hubei, not the same Jingnan Circuit referred to earlier), who would eventually, after Li Cunxu's death, effectively become independent of Later Tang, as well as Southern Han's emissary He Ci (何詞).

Meanwhile, Li Cunxu planned to conquer Former Shu and, in late 925, put his plans into action. He commissioned his oldest son with Empress Liu, Li Jiji, as the titular commander of the operations, but put his chief of staff, Guo Chongtao, in actual command of the operations as Li Jiji's deputy. The attack caught Former Shu's emperor Wang Zongyan by surprise as he thought that the two states were coexisting peacefully. The Later Tang forces repeatedly defeated the forces Former Shu sent to resist it, and, by the end of 925, the situation had become so desperate that the Former Shu major general Wang Zongbi (Wang Yan's adoptive brother) seized Wang Yan and his family and forced Wang Yan to surrender the Former Shu realm to Later Tang, thus ending Former Shu, whose territory was taken over by Later Tang.

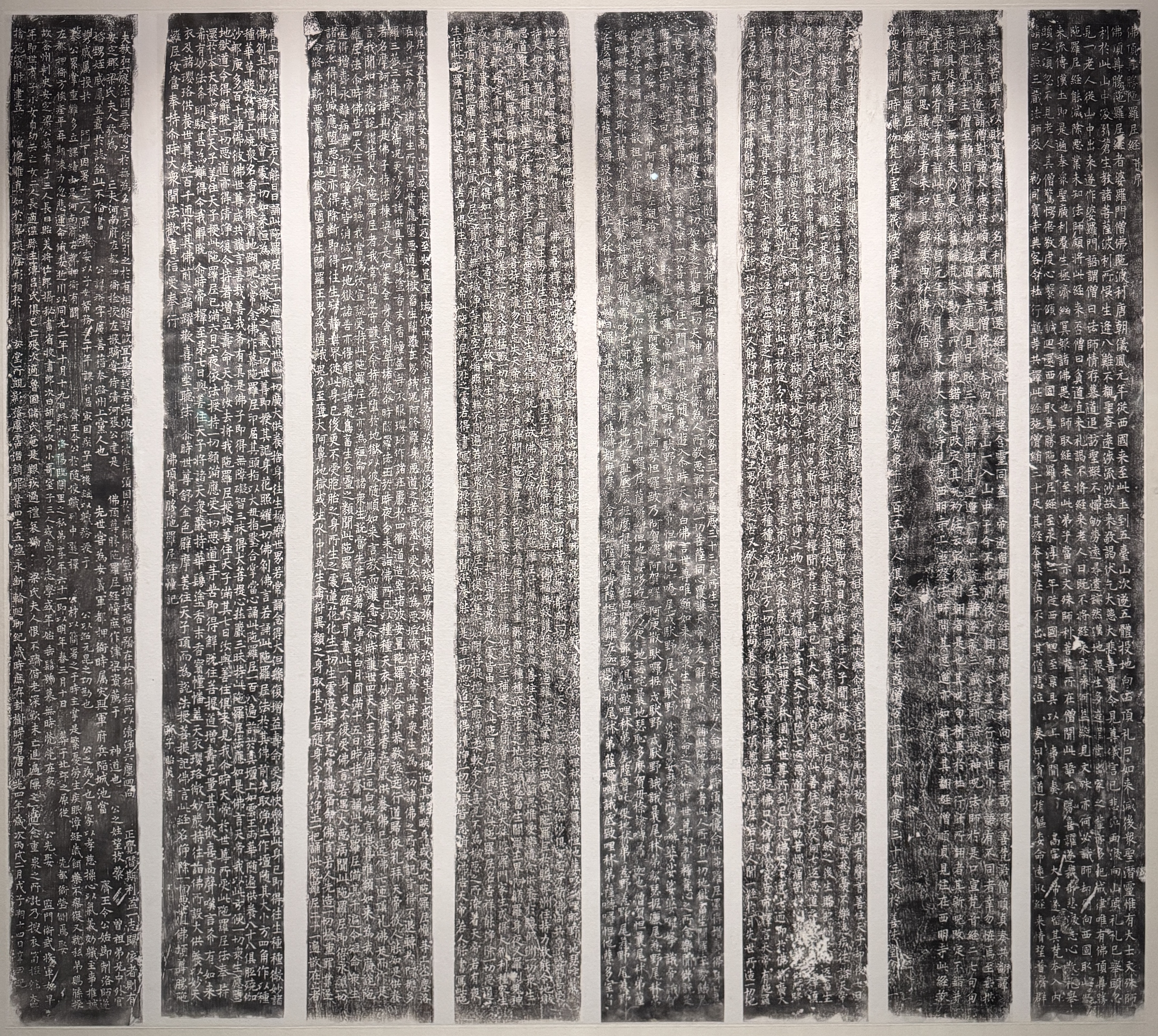
Rubbing from pillar carved with the Uṣṇīṣa Vijaya Dhāraṇī Sutra - 4th year Tongguang Reign (926)

His reign saw the production of Buddhist epigraphy and textual projects, echoing the Tang dynasty's state support for Buddhism as a means of legitimizing Later Tang rule. This included the commissioning of sutra-inscribed pillars, in a deliberate continuation of Tang imperial traditions.

=== Downfall ===
After the conquest of Former Shu, however, both Li Cunxu and Empress Liu came to suspect Guo Chongtao of wanting to occupy the Shu lands and rebel. Li Cunxu, however, was unwilling to act against Guo without further proof. However, Empress Liu went ahead and issued an order to Li Jiji, ordering him to kill Guo. Li Jiji did so. With Guo dead, Li Cunxu went ahead and issued an edict condemning him and ordering his sons be killed as well. Subsequently, with the eunuchs and performers accusing the major general Li Jilin of having plotted rebellion with Guo, Li Cunxu killed Li Jilin and his family members as well.

Guo's and Li Jilin's death sent fear and anger throughout the Later Tang army ranks. The situation was aggravated by the fact that the central Later Tang territory was going through a terrible famine at the time, and, with Empress Liu unwilling to release the funds for famine relief, many soldiers' families starved, further causing them to be angry at the emperor and empress. These resentment spawned a number of revolts, the most serious of which were one led by Kang Yanxiao in the Shu lands (as he was one of the generals under Guo in the Former Shu campaign), and one by the soldiers at Yedu (鄴都, i.e., Xingtang). Kang's rebellion was quickly put down by Ren Huan, but the imperial troops under Li Shaorong had difficulty putting down the Yedu rebellion, and it threatened to become even more problematic. When Li Cunxu subsequently sent Li Siyuan to take over the operations, Li Siyuan's own soldiers mutinied and forced him to join the Yedu mutineers. Li Siyuan tried to send messengers to Li Cunxu to explain he had not intended to rebel, but his messengers were intercepted by Li Shaorong. He decided to attack south and occupy Bian Prefecture (汴州, i.e., formerly Daliang), and Li Cunxu mobilized an army to try to intercept him. Bian Prefecture's defender Kong Xun decided to play both sides, and sent emissaries to both of them, welcoming them. When Li Siyuan reached Bian first, Kong welcomed him in, and rejected Li Cunxu. Hearing this, Li Cunxu dejectedly returned to Luoyang. After he returned to Luoyang, the officer Guo Congqian (郭從謙) led a mutiny, and Li Cunxu tried to fight the mutineers. He suffered an arrow wound in the battle and shortly after died from it. Li Siyuan shortly thereafter arrived at Luoyang and, after initially claiming only the title of regent, eventually took the throne. Empress Liu fled Luoyang but was tracked down by Li Siyuan's emissaries and ordered to kill herself. Li Jiji tried to head to Luoyang to contest Li Siyuan's succession, but on the way, his soldiers deserted him, and he committed suicide. Li Cunxu's younger sons later became monks and fled to Meng Zhixiang, who would treat them as his own sons.

== Poetry ==
Li Cunxu's 4 ci poems were preserved in a Song dynasty book called Zun Qian Ji (尊前集; Collection of Respecting the Old).

== Family ==
Parents:

- Father: Li Keyong (李克用) (24 October 856 – 24 February 908)
- Mother: Empress Zhenjian , of the Cao clan (貞簡皇后曹氏)

Consort and their respective issue(s):

- Empress Shenminjing, of the Liu clan (神閔敬皇后 劉氏, d. 926), personal name Yuniang (劉玉娘)
  - Li Jiji, Prince of Wei (魏王 李繼岌, 909 – 28 May 926), 3rd son
- Pure Consort, of the Han clan (韓淑妃 韓氏, d. 947)
- Virtuous Consort, of the Yi clan (伊氏, d. 947)
- Zhaorong, of the Xia clan ( 昭容夏氏), later the Lady of Guo, later wife of Li Zanhua
- Zhaoyi, of the Hou clan (昭儀侯氏), later the Lady of Qian
- Zhaoyuan, of the Bai clan (昭媛白氏), later the Lady of Yi
- Chushi, of the Deng clan (出使鄧氏), later the Lady of Xu
- Yuzheng, of the Zhang clan (御正張氏), the Lady of Liang
- Shizhen, of the Zhou clan (侍眞周氏), later the Lady of Song
- Shizhen, of the Wu clan (侍真吳氏), later the Lady of Yanling
- Lady of Honorable Talent, of the Wang clan (懿才王氏), the Lady of Taiyuan
- Xianyi, of the Han clan (咸一韩氏), later the Lady of Changli
- Yaofang, of the Zhang clan (瑤芳张氏), the Lady of Qinghe
- Lady of Honorable Moral, of the Wang clan (懿德王氏), later the Lady of Langye
- Xuanyi, of the Ma clan (宣一馬氏), the Lady of Fufeng
- Shizheng, of the Guo clan (誓正 郭氏)
- Unknown:
  - First son
  - Second son
  - Li Jitong, Prince of Shou (守王 李繼潼), 4th son
  - Li Jisong, Prince of Guang (光王 李繼嵩), 5th son
  - Li Jichan, Prince of Zhen (真王 李繼嶦), 6th son
  - Li Jiyao, Prince of Chuan (川王 李繼嶢), 7th son
  - Princess Yining (義寧公主, d. 953), 1st daughter
    - married Song Tinghao (宋廷浩) and had issue ( 1 son)

Li Cunxu Later Tang
Regnal titles
Preceded by Li Keyong	Prince of Jin/Emperor of Later Tang; 908/923 – 926	Succeeded by Li Siyuan (Emperor Mingzong)
Preceded by Li Keyong	Ruler of China (Shanxi); 908–926	Succeeded by Li Siyuan (Emperor Mingzong)
Preceded by Liu Shouguang of Yan	Ruler of China (Beijing/Tianjin/Northern Hebei); 913–926	Succeeded by Li Siyuan (Emperor Mingzong)
Preceded by Wang Chuzhi (Prince of Beiping)	Ruler of China (Baoding region) (de jure); 921–926	Succeeded by Li Siyuan (Emperor Mingzong)
Preceded by Wang Rong (de jure)/Zhang Chujin (de facto)	Ruler of China (Shijiazhuang region); 922–926	Succeeded by Li Siyuan (Emperor Mingzong)
Preceded by Zhu Zhen of Later Liang	Ruler of China (Central); 923–926	Succeeded by Li Siyuan (Emperor Mingzong)
Preceded by Li Maozhen of Qi	Ruler of China (Baoji region) (de jure); 924–926	Succeeded by Li Siyuan (Emperor Mingzong)
Preceded by Wang Zongyan of Former Shu	Ruler of China (Southwestern); 925–926	Succeeded by Li Siyuan (Emperor Mingzong)
