= Zhao (Five Dynasties period) =

Historical Chinese state

Zhao 趙
- 910–921
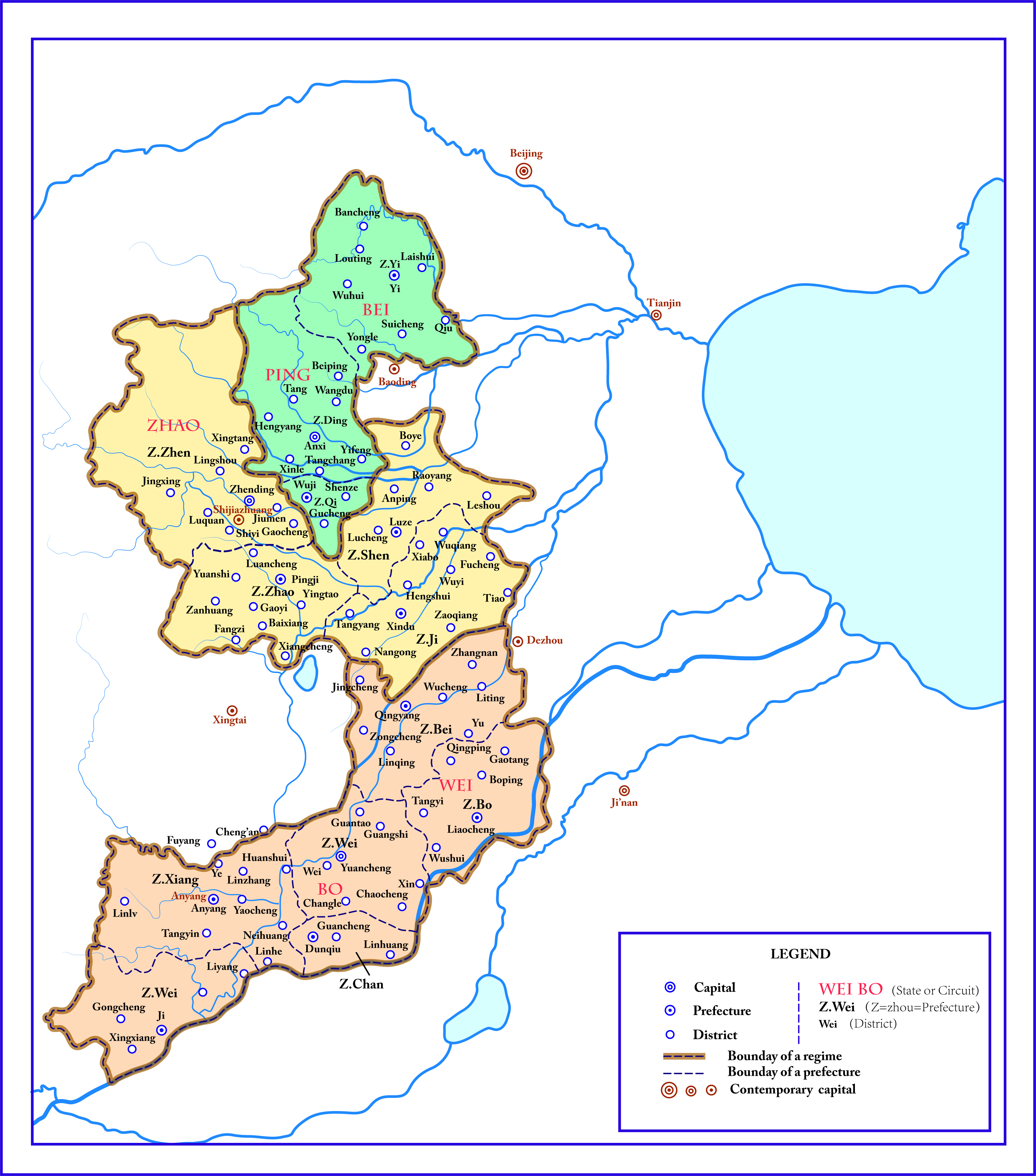
- State of Zhao (yellow)
- Capital: Zhenzhou
- Common languages: Middle Chinese
- Government: Principality/Kingdom (王國)
- Prince/King (王)
  - 910–921: Wang Rong
  - 921: Zhang Wenli
  - 921–922: Zhang Chujin
- Historical era: Five Dynasties
  - Wang Rong created Prince of Zhao by Later Liang: 907
  - Independent: 910
  - Submitted to Jin: 921
  - Conquered by Jin: 922
Preceded by	Succeeded by
Chengde Province	Jin (Later Tang precursor)
- Today part of: Shijiazhuang Prefecture, Hebei, China

Zhao
- Traditional Chinese: 趙
- Simplified Chinese: 赵
Transcriptions
Standard Mandarin
- Hanyu Pinyin: Zhào
- Wade–Giles: Chao
- Traditional Chinese: 趙國
- Simplified Chinese: 赵国
- Literal meaning: State or Kingdom of Zhao
Transcriptions
Standard Mandarin
- Hanyu Pinyin: Zhàoguó
- Wade–Giles: Chao-kuo

Zhao was a kingdom in the area of Shijiazhuang Prefecture in central Hebei, China, from 910–922 during the Five Dynasties and Ten Kingdoms interregnum between the Tang and Song dynasties. It was established by Wang Rong from his territory as the military governor (jiedushi) of the Tang Empire's Chengde Province. Wang was killed during a mutiny of his soldiers in 921 and, despite pledging itself as a Jin vassal, the realm was conquered by neighboring Jin shortly thereafter.

== History ==
Wang Rong was part of a military dynasty who had long ruled Chengde Province as de facto independent military governors (jiedushi) in nominal allegiance to the Tang Empire. After the collapse of the Tang in 907, Wang became the vassal of Zhu Wen, the founding emperor of the Later Liang. In appreciation, Zhu bestowed on Wang the noble title of Prince of Zhao.

In 910, Zhu attempted to assert direct control over both Zhao and neighboring Yiwu around modern Baoding, Hebei. In response, Wang Rong and Yiwu's unrelated lord Wang Chuzhi both seceded from the Later Liang Empire and allied with its rival Jin.

In 920, a failed mutiny prompted such severe retribution from Wang Rong that his adopted son Wang Deming was able to terrify the Zhenzhou guards into mounting a successful mutiny the next year. Wang Rong was killed, Wang Deming resumed use of his birth name Zhang Wenli, and he then executed Wang Rong's natural children. Zhang nominally submitted his lands to Jin's king Li Cunxu, asking to be named their military governor. Li initially accepted this arrangement but, faced with mounting evidence of Zhang's disloyalty, soon invaded. Zhang, already ill, supposedly died from the shock upon hearing of the invasion and the quick fall of Zhaozhou.

His son Zhang Chujin succeeded him and won a series of victories against Jin with his brothers' help. However, the Later Liang refused assistance, the Yiwu governor was assassinated by his own adopted son before he could help, and the Khitan Empire's force was routed by Jin. The Jin siege of Zhenzhou, therefore, was able to finally starve Zhang into capitulation in 922. He, his brothers, and his father's wife were executed. The territory of Zhao was then incorporated into Jin, which subsequently established itself as the Later Tang Empire.

== Kings ==
- Wang Rong (r. 910–921)

== Governors ==
- Zhang Wenli (r. 921)
- Zhang Chujin (r. 921–922)

== See also ==
- Chengde Province
