= Jin (Later Tang precursor) =

State of the Chinese Five Dynasties and Ten Kingdoms period

Jin 晉
- ?–923
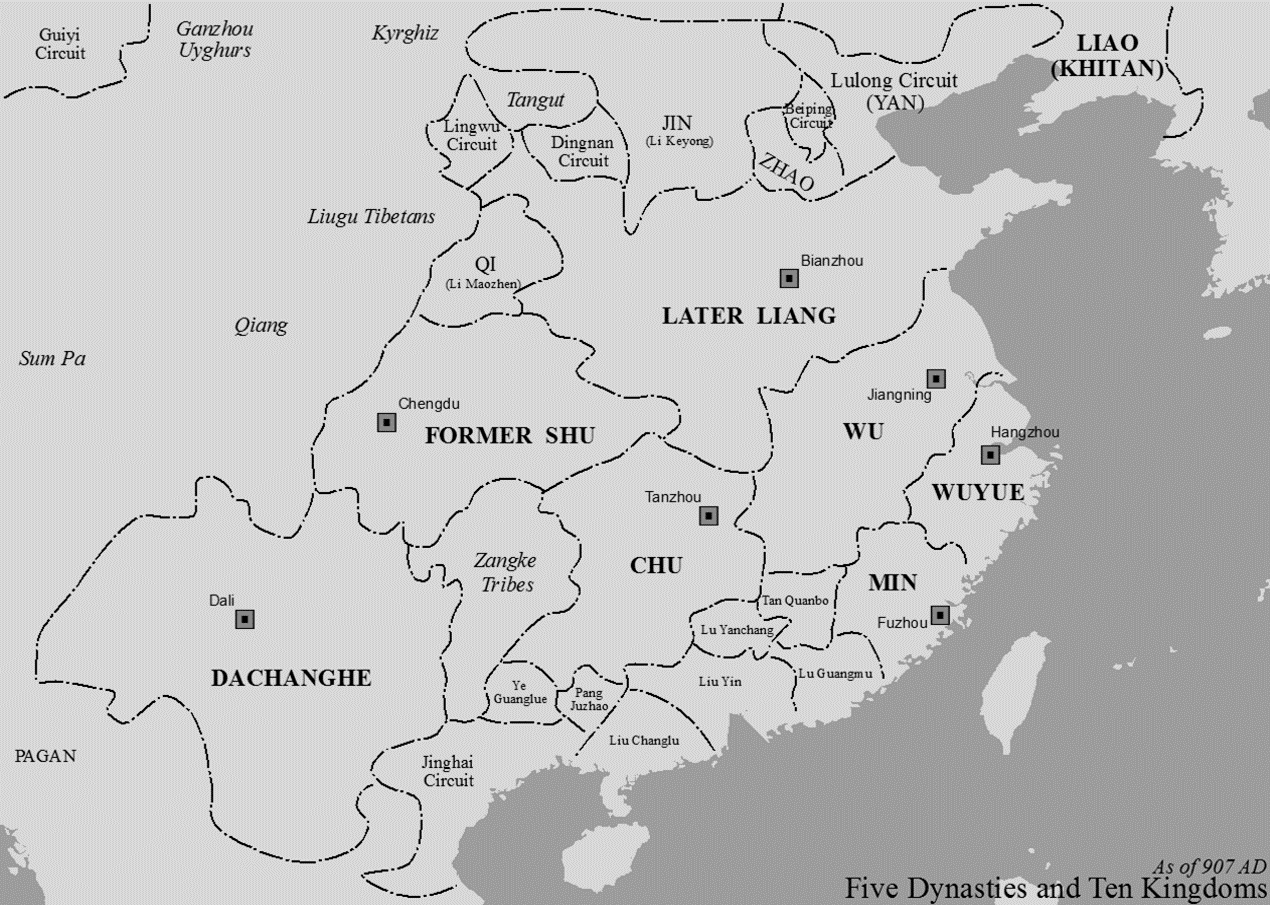
- Capital: Taiyuan
- Government: Principality
- Prince
  - 896/907–908: Li Keyong
  - 908–923: Li Cunxu
- Historical era: Five Dynasties and Ten Kingdoms period
  - Li Keyong created the Prince of Jin: 896
  - Established: ?
  - Disestablished: 923
- Currency: Chinese coin, Chinese cash
Preceded by
| Tang dynasty |
| Yan (Five Dynasties) |
| Zhao (Five Dynasties) |
Succeeded by
| Later Tang |
- Today part of: China

Jin (晉; 883 (or 896 or 907) –923), also known as Hedong (河東) and Former Jin (前晉) in Chinese historiography, was a dynastic state of China and the predecessor of the Later Tang dynasty. Its princely rulers were the ethnic Shatuo warlords Li Keyong and Li Cunxu (Li Keyong's son). Although the Five Dynasties period began only in 907, Li Keyong's territory which centered around modern Shanxi can be referred to as Jin as early as 896, when he was officially created the Prince of Jin by the failing and powerless Tang dynasty court, or even (by extension, anachronistically) as early as 883, when he was created the jiedushi military governor of Hedong Circuit, which controlled more or less the same territory.

== History ==
The Jin rulers Li Keyong and his son Li Cunxu, of Shatuo extraction, claimed to be the rightful subjects of the defunct Tang dynasty (618–907), in a struggle against the usurper state of the Later Liang dynasty.

At the time of the Tang dynasty's fall in 907, the Jin state consisted of most of Shanxi (Linfen, Hezhong, Jincheng, Qinyang were taken by Later Liang) and several parts of Inner Mongolia. In 912, Jin took over Jincheng, and in 913, conquered Yan, and eventually expanded to cover all of the territory north of the Yellow River. Eventually, in 923, Li Cunxu, claiming rightful succession to the Tang throne, declared himself emperor, transitioning his state to the Later Tang dynasty, which shortly after destroyed the Later Liang dynasty.
