= Empress Zhang (Later Liang) =

Empress Zhang (張皇后, personal name unknown) (died March 27, 913) was the wife and empress of Zhu Yougui, who reigned briefly (from 912 to 913) as the emperor of the Chinese Five Dynasties and Ten Kingdoms period state Later Liang.

== Prior to Zhu Yougui's becoming emperor ==
Virtually nothing is known about the future Empress Zhang's family background. She was already Zhu Yougui's wife when he was the Prince of Ying under his father, the founding emperor Emperor Taizu. Late in Emperor Taizu's reign, he was licentious, and when his daughters-in-law attended to him, he often had sexual relations with them, including Lady Zhang. However, he particularly favored Lady Zhang's sister-in-law Lady Wang, the wife of his adoptive son Zhu Youwen the Prince of Bo, who was then the defender of the eastern capital Daliang (with the main capital at Luoyang), such that he considered Zhu Youwen, whom he also personally favored, as his logical heir, causing Zhu Yougui, who was his oldest surviving biological son, to be jealous of Zhu Youwen.

In summer 912, after returning to Luoyang after a campaign against Later Liang's northern rival Jin, Emperor Taizu had become gravely ill, and he sent Lady Wang to the Daliang to summon Zhu Youwen, intending to entrust the empire to him. Lady Zhang was also at the palace and became aware of this. She secretly stated to Zhu Yougui, "The Emperor has given the imperial seal to Lady Wang to take to the Eastern Capital. We will surely die soon!" Further, on July 17, Emperor Taizu also had his chief of staff Jing Xiang issue an order making Zhu Yougui the prefect of Lai Prefecture and decreeing that he report there immediately. This further made Zhu Yougui believe that the next order would be to kill him — for, around that time, it was customary to first exile an official before executing him.

On July 18, Zhu Yougui secretly met with the imperial guard general Han Qing (韓勍), who was also fearful of Emperor Taizu's frequent executions of senior officials and generals, and therefore agreed to participate in a conspiracy with Zhu Yougui. That night, they took their troops into the palace and assassinated Emperor Taizu — with Zhu Yougui personally confronting Emperor Taizu, and then having his servant Feng Ting'e (馮廷諤) carrying out the actual act of stabbing Emperor Taizu to death. Pretending that Emperor Taizu was still alive, Zhu Yougui sent an order in Emperor Taizu's name, delivered by the palace attendant Ding Zhaopu (丁昭溥) to his younger brother Zhu Youzhen the Prince of Jun, who was then the commander of the imperial guards at Daliang, ordering Zhu Youzhen to kill Zhu Youwen. Zhu Youzhen subsequently carried out the order. Zhu Yougui then blamed the assassination on Zhu Youwen and took the throne.

== As empress ==
Traditional sources do not indicate that Zhu Yougui created Lady Zhang empress, but the modern historian Bo Yang, inter alia, referred to her as empress. In any case, in spring 913, Emperor Taizu's nephew, the imperial guard general Yuan Xiangxian, who had formed a plot with Zhu Youzhen and Zhu Youzhen's (and Zhu Yougui's) brother-in-law Zhao Yan, rose against Zhu Yougui at Luoyang and attacked the palace with his soldiers. Zhu Yougui, Empress Zhang, and Feng tried to flee the palace but, when they saw that there was no escape, Zhu Yougui ordered Feng to kill Empress Zhang, then Zhu Yougui, and then himself. Yuan and Zhao then offered the throne to Zhu Youzhen, who accepted it. He posthumously demoted Zhu Yougui to commoner status.

== Notes and references ==
Regnal titles
Preceded by Empress He of the Tang dynasty	Empress of China (most regions); 912–913	Succeeded by Consort Zhang (as wife of sovereign)
Preceded by Empress Li and Empress Zhu of Yan	Empress of China (Cangzhou region); 912–913	Succeeded by Consort Zhang (as wife of sovereign)
