= Wang Yanqiu =

Chinese general

- Chinese: 王晏球
Transcriptions
Standard Mandarin
- Hanyu Pinyin: Wáng Yànqiú
- Wade–Giles: Wang Yen-ch'iu

Wang Yingzhi
- Traditional Chinese: 王瑩之
- Simplified Chinese: 王莹之
Transcriptions
Standard Mandarin
- Hanyu Pinyin: Wáng Yíngzhī
- Wade–Giles: Wang Ying-chih

Du Yanqiu
- Chinese: 杜晏球
Transcriptions
Standard Mandarin
- Hanyu Pinyin: Dù Yànqiú
- Wade–Giles: Tu Yen-ch'iu

Li Shaoqian
- Traditional Chinese: 李紹虔
- Simplified Chinese: 李绍虔
Transcriptions
Standard Mandarin
- Hanyu Pinyin: Lǐ Shàoqián
- Wade–Giles: Li Shao-chien

Wang Yanqiu (869 or 873 – 930 or 932), also known by his adoptive name Du Yanqiu, his courtesy name Yingzhi, and his honorary renaming Li Shaoqian during the period 923–926, was a Chinese general and official of the Later Liang and Later Tang Empires during the Five Dynasties and Ten Kingdoms Era of Chinese history.

== Life ==
=== Early years ===
The biographies of Wang Yanqiu in the History and New History of the Five Dynasties differ in a number of details.

He was born during the reign of the Tang emperor Xizong, either in 869 or in 873. The New History simply states that he came from the Tang's eastern capital Luoyang, although the Old History had been more skeptical, calling the origin "self-claimed". During his youth, much of the Luoyang area was overrun by agrarian rebellions and he is said to have been taken captive by the rebel army of Qin Zongquan.

He was later taken in by a man in Bian Prefecture around modern Kaifeng in Henan. The man adopted Wang as his son, so he took on the new family name Du. Du Yanqiu was said to be quiet, brave, decisive, and not bogged down on details in his youth.

Zhu Quanzhong, the military governor (jiedushi) of Xuanwu (宣武) around Bian and the surrounding prefectures, began recruiting a new group of soldiers known as the Tingzi Corps (廳子都), which Du joined. Because Zhu was known to be intentionally staffing this corps with the sons of wealthy families who displayed strength and ability, the implication is that Du's adoptive father was a wealthy man. Du served in a number of Zhu's campaigns and was eventually promoted to commander of the Tingzi Corps.

=== Under the Later Liang ===
Zhu Quanzhong eventually declared himself emperor, ending Tang rule and establishing his own Later Liang dynasty as its successor. In 909, Du Yanqiu was made a general of the Later Liang.

The Later Liang emperor Zhu Yougui sent Du and Huo Yanwei against the Longxiang mutineers. Du and Huo defeated the mutineers and captured and executed Liu. Du was rewarded by being named one of the commanders of the Left Longxiang Army.

In 913, Zhu Yougui was overthrown by his brother Zhu Youzhen, Prince of Jun, who then took the throne while changing his name to Zhu Zhen. The new emperor made Du Yanqiu the overall commander of the four Longxiang Armies.

In 916, shortly after the defeat of Later Liang's chief general Liu Xun at the hands of archrival Jin's prince Li Cunxu, much of the Later Liang army was in a state of shock. When Zhu Zhen subsequently ordered the officer Li Ba (李霸) to take his 1000 men to take position at Yangliu (楊劉, in modern Liaocheng, Shandong) to guard against a potential Jin attack, Li mutinied and attacked the palace. Du happened to be guarding the palace at that time and he fought Li's mutineers, defeating them. For this accomplishment, he was made prefect of Hui (輝州, in modern Heze, Shandong). He was made one of the generals of the army on the northern border with Jin soon thereafter.

In 923, Li Cunxu declared himself emperor of the Later Tang dynasty, becoming posthumously known as its emperor Zhuangzong. The Later Liang general Duan Ning, trying to reverse his realm's years of losses to this new state, drafted an ambitious four-pronged attack. The main prong, which was to confront the Later Tang emperor himself, was to be commanded by Duan and Du. However, Duan's army was stationed north of the Yellow River as he prepared to launch his attack. Li Cunxu took this opportunity to slide past Duan's army, defeat the weaker prong of the Later Liang attack commanded by Wang Yanzhang and Zhang Hanjie (張漢傑, brother of Zhu Zhen's deceased wife Consort Zhang), and head directly for Later Liang's undefended capital Daliang (modern Kaifeng). Zhu Zhen, believing the situation to be hopeless, committed suicide, ending the Later Liang. However, prior to his suicide, he had sent messengers to Duan and ordered him to immediately return to defend Daliang against the Later Tang attack. Duan sent Du to be his forward commander for this operation. Upon hearing of Zhu Zhen's death, Du surrendered to the Later Tang officer Li Congke at Fengqiu (封丘, in modern Xinxiang, Henan). Duan subsequently surrendered to Later Tang as well.

=== Under the Later Tang ===
Duan Ning and Du Yanqiu subsequently submitted a petition to Li Cunxu, blaming much of the weakness of the Later Liang on the corruption of several important officials—Zhu Zhen's sister's husband Zhao Yan, Zhao Gu (趙鵠), Zhang Xiyi (張希逸), Zhang Hanjie, Zhang Hanjie's cousins Zhang Hanlun (張漢倫) and Zhang Hanrong (張漢融), and Zhu Gui (朱珪). They recommended these officials' execution. The emperor agreed and added the senior Later Liang advisors Jing Xiang and Li Zhen to the list, as well as Yelü Salaabo (耶律撒拉阿撥), the younger brother to the Khitan Empire's Emperor Taizu, who had previously betrayed both the Khitan and Later Tang Empires. The emperor subsequently bestowed the imperial clan surname of Li on Du Yanqiu and also gave him a new name of Shaoqian. In 924, after Li Shaoqian followed another former Later Liang general, Huo Yanwei, in defending against a Khitan attack, he was made the defender (防禦使, fanyushi) of Qi Prefecture (齊州, in modern Jinan, Shandong).

By 926, the Later Tang realm was overrun with mutinies after he had killed the generals Guo Chongtao and Zhu Youqian, angering the troops. One of the chief mutinies was led by another general, the emperor's adoptive brother Li Siyuan. As Li Siyuan headed from Yedu (鄴都, in modern Handan, Hebei) south toward the imperial capital Luoyang, he sent messengers to summon Li Shaoqian, Li Shaoqin (i.e. Duan Ning, whom Li Cunxu had similarly given a new name), and Li Shaoying (李紹英), who were all then stationed at Waqiao (瓦橋, in modern Baoding, Hebei) to defend against a potential Khitan attack, asking them to follow him, and they did. By the time that they reached Li Siyuan's army, Li Siyuan had already entered Bianzhou and was continuing on toward Luoyang, and they followed him. The emperor Li Cunxu was shortly after killed in another mutiny within Luoyang itself, and Li Siyuan entered Luoyang, initially claiming the title of regent and later emperor (posthumously remembered as Emperor Mingzong).

Shortly after Li Siyuan took the throne, a number of generals whom the previous emperor had obliged to join the imperial clan requested to have their original names restored. Li Siyuan approved the requests, and Li Shaoqian took the opportunity not only to restore his original given name of Yanqiu but also to retake his original surname Wang. For his contributions to the new emperor's success, he was made the military governor of Guide (歸德, headquartered in modern Shangqiu, Henan).

In 927, the emperor made Wang the deputy commander of the army in the north defending against the Khitan Empire, stationed at Mancheng (滿城, in modern Baoding).

Meanwhile, the emperor had long despised Wang Du, the military governor of Yiwu in eastern Baoding, for having secured his position by overthrowing his adoptive father and murdering his father's natural children in 921. Yiwu had long been ruled very independently, appointing its own prefects and keeping its own tax revenues since the late Tang. The imperial chief of staff An Chonghui had also been struggling to reassert the primacy of imperial law within Yiwu. Meanwhile, Wang Du himself feared the imperial troops repeatedly passing through his province owing to Khitan incursions, attempted to establish strong alliances with other military governors, and—after Wang Yanqiu rejected his overtures—attempted to bribe Wang Yanqiu's subordinates to assassinate their commander. Wang Yanqiu discovered this and submitted his evidence to the emperor, who ordered a general campaign against Wang Du in the summer of 928. Wang Yanqiu was soon put in charge of the operation, assisted by An Shentong (安審通), the military governor of Henghai Circuit (橫海, headquartered in modern Cangzhou, Hebei).

Shortly after, Wang Yanqiu put Yiwu's capital Dingzhou under siege and then defeated a Khitan relief force commanded by the Khitan general Tunei (禿餒), which Wang Du had requested. Tunei was forced to enter the city to defend it with Wang Du. As Dingzhou had secure defenses, Wang Yanqiu decided not to attack it directly and instead built a temporary headquarters nearby, collecting the tax revenues from Yiwu's three prefectures as its acting jiedushi and preparing for a long siege. He defeated a second and a third Khitan relief force and continued the siege.

However, after his subordinates Zhu Hongzhao and Zhang Qianzhao both submitted reports condemning his meek approach, the emperor ordered a direct attack. Wang Yanqiu complied, losing 3,000 men. When another imperial messenger arrived, bearing orders for continued attacks, Wang Yanqiu showed the envoy around the walls of Dingzhou, arguing that its defense was so secure that any direct attack would merely cause casualties. Subsequently, the emperor Li Siyuan conceded and endorsed the general's strategy of employing a long siege. Throughout the siege, Wang Yanqiu expended his own funds to supply the soldiers and did not kill any himself.

By spring 929, Dingzhou was in a desperate state. Wang Du and Tunei attempted to fight their way out of the siege, but could not. Wang Du's officer Ma Rangneng (馬讓能) thereafter opened the city's gates to allow the imperial forces in. Wang Du, finding his situation hopeless, committed suicide, burning himself, his family, and his extensive collection of rare books. The Khitan general Tunei was captured and executed. For this victory, Wang Yanqiu was made the military governor of Tianping (天平, headquartered in modern Tai'an, Shandong) and given the honorary chancellor designation of shizhong (侍中). When he subsequently arrived at Luoyang to pay homage to the emperor, Li Siyuan praised him. He did not claim any contributions, other than to apologize for the siege taking too long.

Shortly after, Wang Yanqiu was moved to Pinglu (平盧, headquartered in modern Weifang, Shandong) in 930 and given the honorary chancellor designation of zhongshu ling (中書令). He died while still serving at Pinglu, either in 930 or 932. (His biography in the History of the Five Dynasties indicates he died in 932 at the age of 59, while his biography in the New History of the Five Dynasties indicates he died the year of his transfer to Pinglu at the age of 61.)
