= Yuan Xiangxian =

Yuan Xiangxian (袁象先) (864?/865? – July 11, 924?), known briefly as Li Shao'an (李紹安) during the reign of Emperor Zhuangzong of Later Tang, was a general of the Chinese Five Dynasties and Ten Kingdoms period states Later Liang and Later Tang. He was a nephew of Later Liang's founding emperor Zhu Wen (Zhu Quanzhong).

== Background ==
Yuan Xiangxian was born in either 864 (according to the History of the Five Dynasties) or 865 (according to the New History of the Five Dynasties), during the reign of Emperor Yizong of Tang. The family of his father Yuan Jingchu (袁敬初) claimed to be descended from the mid-Tang dynasty chancellor Yuan Shuji. His great-grandfather Yuan Jinchao (袁進朝) was a deputy mayor of Chengdu, while his grandfather Yuan Zhongyi (袁忠義) served as a secretary at Zhongwu Circuit (忠武, then-headquartered in modern Xuchang, Henan). His mother was a Lady Zhu, who was a sister to Zhu Quanzhong, the eventual founder of Later Liang but who predeceased the founding of the dynasty. In his youth, it was said that Yuan Xiangxian had a kind and generous disposition.

== Service under Zhu Quanzhong during Tang dynasty ==
Yuan Xiangxian's army career started in or shortly after 883, when his uncle Zhu Quanzhong was made the military governor of Xuanwu, as he thereafter became an officer at Xuanwu. He was gradually promoted through the ranks within the Xuanwu army itself. In 899, Zhu Quanzhong put him in charge of Su Prefecture (宿州, in modern Suzhou, Anhui), and in 901 made him full military prefect of the prefecture (團練使, Tuanlianshi). Shortly after, the army of Zhu's rival Yang Xingmi the military governor of Huainan Circuit (淮南, headquartered in modern Yangzhou, Jiangsu) put Su under siege, but Yuan capably defended it, and the city did not fall. In 903, he was put in charge of Ming Prefecture (洺州, in modern Handan, Hebei) In 906, he was made the prefect of Chen Prefecture (陳州, in modern Zhumadian, Henan).

== During Later Liang ==
In 908, by which time Zhu Quanzhong had seized the Tang throne and established a new Later Liang as its Emperor Taizu, Yuan Xiangxian was recalled to serve as a general of the imperial guards. In 909, he was created the Baron of Ru'nan. In 910, he was made the acting military governor of Xuanwu Circuit — which, by that point, had had its capital moved to Song Prefecture (宋州, in modern Shangqiu, Henan) as its prior capital Daliang had become the imperial eastern capital. Shortly after, he was moved to be the acting military governor of Tianping Circuit (天平, headquartered in modern Tai'an, Shandong). At that time, the circuit was suffering through a major famine, and Yuan was credited with opening up the military food reserves to feed the people. In 911, when Emperor Taizu launched a campaign north against Zhao and Yiwu Circuit (義武, headquartered in modern Baoding, Hebei) (which was allied with Zhao, as well as Later Liang's archenemy Jin), Yuan was put in charge of the southeastern theater of the campaign and created a count. He unsuccessfully sieged Tiao County (蓨縣, in modern Hengshui, Hebei) before the Later Liang army withdrew. He was thereafter recalled to the imperial government to serve as an imperial guard general.

In summer 912, Emperor Taizu was assassinated by his son Zhu Yougui the Prince of Ying, who then took the throne after putting his adoptive brother Zhu Youwen the Prince of Bo to death and blaming Zhu Youwen for the assassination. However, many generals believed Zhu Yougui to be responsible, and Yuan was soon in contact with the major general Yang Shihou, Emperor Taizu's son-in-law Zhao Yan, and Emperor Taizu's son Zhu Youzhen the Prince of Jun, plotting to overthrow Zhu Yougui. In spring 913, Yuan sent his soldiers into the palace and had Zhu Yougui surrounded. Zhu Yougui, seeing the situation as hopeless, committed suicide with his wife Empress Zhang and his servant Feng Ting'e (馮廷諤). Yuan and Zhao took over control of the capital Luoyang, and sent the imperial seal to Daliang, where Zhu Youzhen was then at the time, offering the throne to him. Zhu Youzhen accepted and took the throne at Daliang. For his contributions, Yuan was given the honorary titles of military governor of Zhennan Circuit (鎮南, headquartered in modern Nanchang, Jiangxi, then under control of Later Liang's enemy Wu), acting Taibao (太保), honorary chancellor (同中書門下平章事, Tong Zhongshu Menxia Pingzhangshi), acting mayor of Kaifeng (i.e., Daliang), and the commander of the capital guards; he was also created a duke. In 914, he was made the military governor of Pinglu Circuit (平盧, headquartered in modern Weifang, Shandong), and shortly after the military governor of Xuanwu, where he would remain for some 10 years. When Wu's junior regent Xu Zhixun put Ying Prefecture (潁州, in modern Fuyang, Anhui) under siege late in 916, Zhu Youzhen (who had changed his name to Zhu Zhen by this point) ordered Yuan to command a relief force; when Yuan approached Ying, Xu withdrew. It was said that during Emperor Taizu's reign, a culture of corruption developed among the generals. In particular, Yuan, as a nephew of the emperor, while governing the circuits, took much wealth from the people and enriched himself.

== During Later Tang ==
In 923, Jin's prince Li Cunxu, who had declared himself emperor of a new Later Tang earlier in the year (as Emperor Zhuangzong), launched a surprise direct attack on the Later Liang capital Daliang. With the main Later Liang army away from the capital and unable to save him, Zhu Zhen committed suicide before the city fell, ending Later Liang. Once the Later Tang emperor entered the former Later Liang capital, the Later Liang military governors submitted to the new state in droves, with Yuan Xiangxian and Huo Yanwei the acting military governor of Zhenguo Circuit (鎮國, headquartered in modern Sanmenxia, Henan) arriving first. It was said that Yuan, with the wealth that he had accumulated, brought tens of carts of jewels and other treasures to the capital, and used the wealth to bribe Emperor Zhuangzong's favorite consort Lady Liu, as well as other powerful officials, eunuchs, and performers that Emperor Zhuangzong favored, thus causing them to all praise him greatly. Emperor Zhuangzong changed the name of his circuit from Xuanwu to Guide (歸德, "returning with virtue") (as Emperor Zhuangzong returned the Xuanwu name to Daliang), and bestowed the imperial clan name of Li on him with a new name of Shao'an, before sending him back to his circuit. He died later next summer while still serving at Guide, and was given posthumous honors.

== Notes and references ==
- History of the Five Dynasties, vol. 59.
- New History of the Five Dynasties, vol. 45.
- Zizhi Tongjian, vols. 268, 269, 272.
