= Zhu Yougui =

Emperor of Later Liang from 912 to 913

Zhu Yougui 朱友珪

Emperor of the Later Liang dynasty
- Reign: July 21, 912 – March 27, 913
- Predecessor: Emperor Taizu
- Successor: Emperor Mo
- Born: 886
- Died: March 27, 913 (aged 24–25)
Full name
- Family name: Zhū (朱); Given name: Yǒuguī (友珪)
Era name and dates
- Fènglì (鳳曆): March 1, 913 – 913
- House: Zhu
- Dynasty: Later Liang

Zhu Yougui (Chinese: 朱友珪) (886 – March 27, 913), nickname Yaoxi (遙喜), often known by his princely title Prince of Ying (郢王), was briefly the second emperor of the Chinese Later Liang dynasty during the Five Dynasties and Ten Kingdoms period. He became emperor after assassinating his father, the founding emperor Emperor Taizu (Zhu Quanzhong). Several months later, after facing a rebellion led by his brother Zhu Youzhen, the Prince of Jun and cousin Yuan Xiangxian, he committed suicide.

== Background ==
Zhu Yougui was the third son of Zhu Quanzhong (with the two older sons being a biological half-brother, Zhu Youyu (朱友裕) and an adoptive brother, Zhu Youwen), who, at the time of his birth, was the Tang dynasty military governor (jiedushi) of Xuanwu Circuit (宣武, headquartered in modern Kaifeng, Henan). His mother was a military prostitute at Bo Prefecture (亳州, in modern Bozhou, Anhui), and her name is lost to history. During the Guangqi era (885–888) of Emperor Xizong of Tang, Zhu Quanzhong was on a campaign when he visited Bo Prefecture, and had sexual relations with Zhu Yougui's mother there. After a month, Zhu Quanzhong prepared to leave, and the prostitute informed him that she was pregnant. At that time, Zhu Quanzhong's wife Lady Zhang was honored, favored, and feared by him, so he did not take the prostitute back to Xuanwu's capital Bian Prefecture (汴州) with him, keeping her at a mansion at Bo Prefecture instead. When she subsequently delivered a boy, she sent a messenger to inform him. He was pleased, and gave the child the nickname Yaoxi ("remote joy"). Zhu Quanzhong later welcomed Zhu Yougui to Bian Prefecture, but it is not known whether his mother went there with him.

== During Emperor Taizu's reign ==
In 907, Zhu Quanzhong had Tang's last emperor Emperor Ai yield the throne to him, ending Tang and starting a new Later Liang with him as its Emperor Taizu. He created his older brother (Zhu Yougui's uncle) Zhu Quanyu (朱全昱), as well as his sons, including Zhu Yougui, imperial princes, with Zhu Yougui being created the Prince of Ying. (As Zhu Youyu had died by that point, Zhu Yougui was the emperor's oldest surviving biological son.) In 910, Emperor Taizu made Zhu Yougui the commander of the elite Konghe Corps (控鶴) of the imperial guards and also bestowed on him the honorific title of acting Situ (司徒, one of the Three Excellencies); he also made Zhu Yougui titularly the general over all non-Han soldiers. In 911, Zhu Yougui was additionally made the discipline officer over all of the armies.

Meanwhile, it was said that over the years, after the death of Zhu Youzhen's mother Lady Zhang, Emperor Taizu became increasingly licentious, such that when his sons were away to attend to military matters, he would summon their wives to the palace to attend to him and often had sexual relations with them. Zhu Youwen's wife Lady Wang was said to be particularly beautiful and favored by Emperor Taizu, such that this became a factor in his increasingly believing Zhu Youwen, who was then serving as the defender of the eastern capital Daliang (i.e., the former Bian Prefecture, with Emperor Taizu's having established Luoyang as the main capital) to be his appropriate heir. Zhu Yougui was particularly jealous of the favors that Emperor Taizu showed Zhu Youwen. He also became disenchanted with his father after Emperor Taizu had him publicly battered on one occasion after he had committed some faults.

In summer 912, after returning to Luoyang after a campaign against Later Liang's northern rival Jin, Emperor Taizu had become gravely ill, and he sent Lady Wang to Daliang to summon Zhu Youwen, intending to entrust the empire to him. Zhu Yougui's wife (also named Zhang) was also at the palace and became aware of this. She secretly stated to Zhu Yougui, "The Emperor has given the imperial seal to Lady Wang to take to the Eastern Capital. We will surely die soon!" Further, on July 17, Emperor Taizu also had his chief of staff Jing Xiang issue an order making Zhu Yougui the prefect of Lai Prefecture and decreeing that he report there immediately. This further made Zhu Yougui believe that the next order would be to kill him—for, around that time, it was customary to first exile an official before executing him.

On July 18, Zhu Yougui secretly met with the imperial guard general Han Qing (韓勍), who was also fearful of Emperor Taizu's frequent executions of senior officials and generals, and therefore agreed to participate in a conspiracy with Zhu Yougui. That night, they took their troops into the palace and assassinated Emperor Taizu—with Zhu Yougui personally confronting Emperor Taizu, and then having his servant Feng Ting'e (馮廷諤) carrying out the actual act of stabbing Emperor Taizu to death. Pretending that Emperor Taizu was still alive, Zhu Yougui sent an order in Emperor Taizu's name, delivered by the palace attendant Ding Zhaopu (丁昭溥) to Zhu Youzhen, who was then the commander of the imperial guards at Daliang, ordering Zhu Youzhen to kill Zhu Youwen. Zhu Youzhen subsequently carried out the order. Zhu Yougui then blamed the assassination on Zhu Youwen and took the throne.

== Brief reign ==
Shortly after Zhu Yougui's taking the throne, the senior general Yang Shihou, who was then at Wei Prefecture (魏州, in modern Handan, Hebei) to defend it against potential Jin attacks, used the opportunity to seize the wealthy Tianxiong Circuit (天雄, headquartered at Wei Prefecture), and Zhu Yougui did not dare to challenge Yang; instead, he commissioned Yang as the military governor of Tianxiong, while transferring Tianxiong's military governor Luo Zhouhan, whom Yang displaced, to Xuanyi Circuit (宣義, headquartered in modern Anyang, Henan). Zhu Yougui subsequently summoned Yang to a meeting and, at the meeting, ingratiated himself with Yang to try to get Yang, who was respected by the Later Liang soldiers, to support him; he subsequently sent Yang back to Tianxiong.

Despite Zhu Yougui's blaming Emperor Taizu's death on Zhu Youwen, rumors quickly spread that Zhu Yougui himself was responsible for Emperor Taizu's death, causing many senior generals to be alienated from him, despite his attempts to pacify them by giving them rewards. Zhu Youqian the military governor of Huguo Circuit (護國, headquartered in modern Yuncheng, Shanxi) was particularly vocal, and when Zhu Yougui summoned him to Luoyang, Zhu Youqian refused. Zhu Yougui thus declared a general campaign against Zhu Youqian, with Kang Huaizhen (康懷貞) serving as the commander and Han Qing serving as Kang's deputy. Zhu Youqian thereafter submitted to Jin's prince Li Cunxu and sought aid from Jin. Kang quickly advanced to Huguo's capital Hezhong Municipality (河中) and put it under siege, but Li Cunxu then arrived and repelled the Later Liang forces under Kang.

Despite the loss of Huguo, it was said that Zhu Yougui was himself becoming arrogant and licentious, further alienating the generals and the officials. Zhu Youzhen began plotting with his (and Zhu Yougui's) brother-in-law Zhao Yan and cousin Yuan Xiangxian. Zhu Youzhen also sent an emissary to Wei Prefecture and persuaded Yang to support him; Yang agreed. In spring 913, Yuan, who was then an imperial guard general, rose with his soldiers and fought into the palace. Zhu Yougui, Empress Zhang, and Feng tried to flee the palace but, when they saw that there was no escape, Zhu Yougui ordered Feng to kill Empress Zhang, then Zhu Yougui, and then himself. Yuan and Zhao then offered the throne to Zhu Youzhen, who accepted it. He posthumously demoted Zhu Yougui to commoner status.

== Personal information ==
- Father
  - Zhu Wen
- Mother
  - Name unknown, military prostitute at Bo Prefecture
- Wife
  - Empress Zhang

== Notes and references ==
- History of the Five Dynasties, vol. 12.
- New History of the Five Dynasties, vol. 13.
- Zizhi Tongjian, vols. 266, 268.

Zhu Yougui Later Liang Born: c. 888? Died: 913
Regnal titles
Preceded by Zhu Wen	Emperor of Later Liang; 912–913	Succeeded by Zhu Youzhen
