= Zhao Yan (Later Liang) =

Zhao Yan (趙巖) (died 923), né Zhao Lin (趙霖), was an official of the Chinese Five Dynasties and Ten Kingdoms period Later Liang state. As a son-in-law of its founding emperor Zhu Wen and as someone instrumental in the succession of its last emperor Zhu Zhen (Zhu Youzhen), he was influential during Zhu Zhen's reign and was traditionally blamed for corruption and misleading the emperor into making critical mistakes that caused Later Liang's fall at the hands of its rival Later Tang.

== Background ==
It is not known when exactly Zhao Lin was born, but as he was described as being capable to command soldiers as of the time of his father Zhao Chou's resistance of the agrarian rebel army under Huang Chao while Zhao Chou was serving as the prefect of Chen Prefecture (陳州, in modern Zhumadian, Henan) during the Tang dynasty in 883, he must have been born a number of years prior to 883. He was Zhao Chou's second son, and during the resistance against Huang, he served under his father alongside his uncles Zhao Chang (趙昶) and Zhao Xu (趙珝), and his older brother Zhao Lu (趙麓). As Zhu Quanzhong the military governor (Jiedushi) of nearby Xuanwu Circuit (宣武, headquartered in modern Kaifeng, Henan) aided Zhao Chou during both the resistance against Huang and later against another major rebel, Qin Zongquan, whose capital was nearby Cai Prefecture (蔡州, also in modern Zhumadian), Zhao became a vassal of Zhu's as Zhu's power grew, and they entered into a marriage alliance where Zhao Lin, who changed his name to Zhao Yan at some point, married Zhu's daughter (the later Princess Changle). Shortly after Qin was captured and executed by Tang in 889, Zhao Chou, who was by that point the military governor of Fengguo Circuit (奉國, headquartered at Cai Prefecture), also died, and by his recommendation Zhao Chang succeeded him. Nothing was recorded in history about Zhao Yan from this point on for more than a decade.

== During Emperor Taizu's and Zhu Yougui's reigns ==
After Zhu Quanzhong seized the Tang throne in 907, ending Tang and starting a new Later Liang as its Emperor Taizu, Zhao Yan was given the ceremonial titles as minister of the guards (衛尉卿, Weiwei Qing) and Fuma Duwei (駙馬都尉, a title reserved for princesses' husbands). In 908, he was briefly put in charge of Ming Prefecture (洺州, in modern Handan, Hebei) before being recalled to serve in various command posts in the Later Liang imperial guard army. In 909, he was made the military prefect (團練使, Tuanlianshi) of Su Prefecture (宿州, in modern Suzhou, Anhui), before being recalled to again serve in the imperial guard army.

In 912, Emperor Taizu was assassinated at the capital Luoyang by his son Zhu Yougui the Prince of Ying, who then took the throne himself after blaming the assassination on his adoptive brother Zhu Youwen the Prince of Bo and putting Zhu Youwen to death. However, many officials suspected Zhu Yougui of being responsible, and shortly after Zhu Yougui's ascension, Zhao Yan entered into a plot with Emperor Taizu's nephew Yuan Xiangxian (a fellow commander in the imperial guards) and the major general Yang Shihou, as well as another son of Emperor Taizu's, Zhu Youzhen the Prince of Jun, to overthrow Zhu Yougui and support Zhu Youzhen as emperor. In spring 913, Yuan sent his soldiers into the palace and had Zhu Yougui surrounded, and Zhu Yougui committed suicide. Yuan and Zhao sent the imperial seal to the eastern capital Daliang, where Zhu Youzhen was at the time. Zhu Youzhen accepted and took the throne at Daliang, making it the capital.

== During Zhu Zhen's reign ==
Because of Zhao Yan's contribution to the succession of Zhu Youzhen (who later changed his name to Zhu Zhen), Zhu made him the director of material pricing (租庸使, Zuyongshi), as well as acting minister of census (戶部尚書, Hubu Shangshu). Because of his contributions and familial relationship to the emperor, Zhao Yan became arrogant and publicly received bribes and gifts, making him very wealthy. Admiring the example of the Tang dynasty chancellor Du Cong, who was also the husband of a princess, he lived luxuriously. It was said that Zhu distrusted imperial officials and trusted only Zhao, as well as four men related to Zhu Zhen's wife Consort Zhang — Consort Zhang's brothers Zhang Handing (張漢鼎) and Zhang Hanjie (張漢傑) and cousins Zhang Hanlun (張漢倫) and Zhang Hanrong (張漢融) — and that their advice led him astray. For example, it was said that in 915, it was at the suggestion of Zhao and Shao Zan (邵贊) that led Zhu Zhen to try to divide the powerful army of Tianxiong Circuit (天雄, headquartered in modern Handan) in two, which led, disastrously for Later Liang, to the Tianxiong army revolting and surrendering the circuit to Later Liang's archrival Jin. In 917, it was at Zhao's suggestion that Zhu Zhen planned a grand ceremony near Luoyang to offer sacrifices to heaven and earth — a traditional ceremony for emperors — despite contrary advice by the chancellor Jing Xiang, who pointed out that the state could not afford the expenses of the ceremony and the required stipends to be paid to the soldiers attending the ceremony. (However, the ceremony was ultimately cancelled when (false) rumors came that Daliang had fallen to Jin forces, causing Zhu Zhen to cancel the ceremony and return to Daliang to quell the rumors.) Other acts of Zhu Zhen's that Zhao was blamed for included the commission of the corrupt Li Qi as chancellor, as well as the commission of bandit-turned-general Wen Zhaotu (溫昭圖) as the military governor (Jiedushi) of Kuangguo Circuit (匡國, headquartered in modern Xuchang, Henan), whom he considered a friend.

In 923, Later Liang and Later Tang — i.e., Jin, as in 923 Li Cunxu the Prince of Jin declared himself emperor of Tang and his state was thereafter known as Later Tang — forces were engaged in intense battles on and near the two states' borders on the Yellow River. After a devastating loss of Yun Prefecture (鄆州, in modern Tai'an, Shandong) to a Later Tang surprise attack led by the Later Tang emperor's adoptive brother Li Siyuan, Zhu, at Jing's recommendation, commissioned the capable general Wang Yanzhang as the supreme commander of the Later Liang forces, and Wang was able to achieve some victories over Later Tang forces. However, as Wang was known to have despised Zhao and the Zhangs for their wrong advice to the emperor, Zhao and the Zhangs repeatedly defamed him and credited the victories to his deputy commander, Duan Ning. As a result, Zhu removed Wang and made Duan the supreme commander.

Duan formulated an ambitious four-prong counterattack against Later Tang, with the main forces being put under the command of Duan himself and Du Yanqiu, to confront the Later Tang emperor himself in Tianxiong territory. The Later Tang emperor took the advice of the former Later Liang officer Kang Yanxiao and his chief of staff Guo Chongtao, crossed the Yellow River to rendezvous with Li Siyuan, and then engaged one of the weaker prongs of Duan's four-prong attack, which was under the command of Wang and Zhang Hanjie. He crushed Wang's and Zhang's army and captured then, and then directly headed for Daliang, which was left defenseless in Duan's attack plan. Zhu considered fleeing to Luoyang, but Zhao pointed out if he tried to flee, the imperial guards might mutiny, so he did not do so, but stayed at Daliang, futilely waiting for Duan to return to save him, but Duan was not able to.

Meanwhile, despite his advice to the emperor, Zhao himself planned to flee. Believing that his friendship with Wen meant that Wen would shelter him, he fled to Kuangguo's capital Xu Prefecture (許州). (Shortly after Zhao fled, Zhu Zhen, with the Later Tang army approaching, committed suicide, ending Later Liang.) Wen initially welcomed Zhao warmly and hid him in the mansion, and then killed him, presenting his head to the Later Tang emperor.

== Painting ==
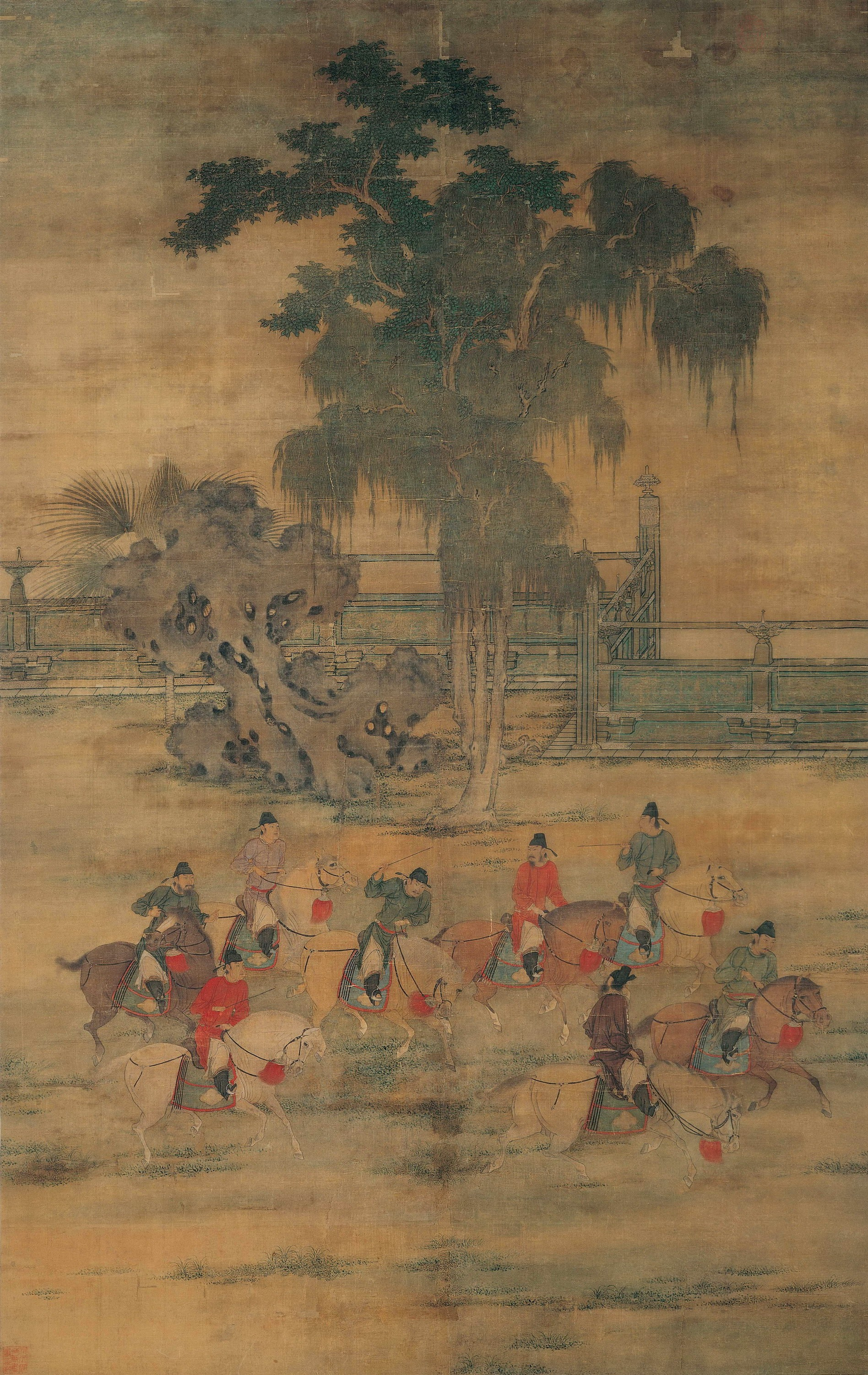
"Eight Gentlemen on a Spring Outing," attributed to Zhao Yan

Zhao Yan was also an accomplished painter, known for painting figures and horses. The National Palace Museum in Taipei includes a hanging scroll attributed to him, "Eight Gentlemen on a Spring Outing" (八達春遊圖).

== Notes and references ==
- History of the Five Dynasties, vol. 14.
- New History of the Five Dynasties, vol. 42.
- Zizhi Tongjian, vols. 268, 269, 270, 271, 272.
