= Zhu Youwen =

Later Liang prince (died 912)

Zhu Youwen (Chinese: 朱友文; died 912), né Kang Qin (康勤), courtesy name Deming (德明), formally the Prince of Bo (博王), was an imperial prince of the Chinese Five Dynasties and Ten Kingdoms period state Later Liang. He was an adoptive son of the founding emperor Emperor Taizu (Zhu Quanzhong) and was considered a potential heir to the throne. However, in 912, his older brother (Emperor Taizu's biological son) Zhu Yougui assassinated Emperor Taizu and had him put to death.

== Background ==
It is not known when Kang Qin was born, and it is also not know the exact circumstances under which he became an adoptive son of Zhu Quanzhong's. However, it is said that in his youth, he was handsome, studious, good at speaking, and good at writing poetry. He eventually became an adoptive son of Zhu Quanzhong's and changed his name to Zhu Youwen, apparently before Zhu Quanzhong became the military governor (jiedushi) for four circuits (i.e., in addition to his main territory Xuanwu Circuit (宣武, headquartered in modern Kaifeng, Henan, the circuits of Xuanyi (宣義, headquartered in modern Anyang, Henan), Tianping (天平, headquartered in modern Tai'an, Shandong), and Huguo (護國, headquartered in modern Yuncheng, Shaanxi) in 901 because, after Zhu Quanzhong became the military governor for the four circuits, he commissioned Zhu Youwen as the overseer for budget matters, as well as for salt and iron monopolies. Among Zhu's sons, biological and adopted, Zhu Youwen was the second oldest, younger than Zhu Youyu (朱友裕) (who died before the establishment of Later Liang) but older than the rest. During Zhu Quanzhong's campaigns to conquer the surrounding circuits, Zhu Youwen collected taxes and managed the finances to supply his army. It was said that Zhu Quanzhong favored him over the next two oldest biological sons, Zhu Yougui and Zhu Youzhen.

== Service under Emperor Taizu ==
In 907, Zhu Quanzhong had the Tang dynasty's last emperor, Emperor Ai, yield the throne to him, ending Tang and starting a new Later Liang as its Emperor Taizu. He created his sons imperial princes, and Zhu Youwen, who had become the deputy military governor of Xuanwu before he took the throne, was given the title of Prince of Bo. Emperor Taizu also made Zhu Youwen the mayor of Kaifeng (i.e., the old Xuanwu headquarters), as well as the director of Jianchang Hall (建昌院)—a conversion of the office overseeing financial matters for the four circuits into an imperial institution. After Emperor Taizu formally made Luoyang his capital in 903, he also made Kaifeng the eastern capital and Zhu Youwen its defender. It was said that, after this point, Zhu Youwen often spent time in drinking and was not as attentive to his responsibilities as before.

In 911, after Emperor Taizu summoned Zhang Shensi (張慎思) the prefect of Cai Prefecture (蔡州, in modern Zhumadian, Henan) to Luoyang, the Cai Prefecture officer Liu Xingcong (劉行琮) mutinied and prepared to lead the soldiers to flee to Later Liang's rival Hongnong. Another officer, Wang Cunyan (王存儼), killed Zhang and claimed the title of prefect. Zhu Youwen, displeased that Wang was claiming such authority without first receiving imperial commission, sent an army to attack Wang, but when Emperor Taizu heard this, he pointed out that doing so would force Wang into fleeing to Hongnong, and therefore sent messengers to stop Zhu Youwen from attacking Wang. (Emperor Taizu later made Wang the prefect of Cai.)

After a failed campaign against rival Jin in spring 912, Emperor Taizu fell ill and spent summer 912 at Wei Prefecture (魏州, in modern Handan, Hebei) to recuperate. While he was recuperating, Zhu Youwen went to Wei Prefecture to see him and suggested that he visit Daliang (i.e., Kaifeng). Emperor Taizu accepted the suggestion, and visited Daliang before returning to Luoyang.

== Death ==
Meanwhile, it was said that over the years, after the death of Emperor Taizu's wife Lady Zhang (Zhu Youzhen's mother), Emperor Taizu became increasingly licentious, such that when his sons were away to attend to military matters, he would summon their wives to the palace to attend to him and often had sexual relations with them. Zhu Youwen's wife Lady Wang was said to be particularly beautiful and favored by Emperor Taizu, such that this became a factor in his increasingly believing Zhu Youwen to be his appropriate heir. Zhu Yougui, who by this point was serving as the commander of the special Konghe (控鶴) corps that guarded the palace, was particularly jealous of the favors that Emperor Taizu showed Zhu Youwen. He also became disenchanted with his father after Emperor Taizu had him publicly battered on one occasion after he had committed some faults.

In summer 912, after returning to Luoyang, Emperor Taizu had become gravely ill, and he sent Lady Wang to Daliang to summon Zhu Youwen, intending to entrust the empire to him. Zhu Yougui's wife Lady Zhang was also at the palace and became aware of this. She secretly stated to Zhu Yougui, "The Emperor has given the imperial seal to Lady Wang to take to the Eastern Capital. We will surely die soon!" Further, on July 17, Emperor Taizu also had his chief of staff Jing Xiang issue an order making Zhu Yougui the prefect of Lai Prefecture and decreeing that he report there immediately. This further made Zhu Yougui believe that the next order would be to kill him — for, around that time, it was customary to first exile an official before executing him.

On July 18, Zhu Yougui secretly met with the imperial guard general Han Qing (韓勍), who was also fearful of Emperor Taizu's frequent executions of senior officials and generals, and therefore agreed to participate in a conspiracy with Zhu Yougui. That night, they took their troops into the palace and assassinated Emperor Taizu, but pretending that Emperor Taizu was still alive, Zhu Yougui sent an order in Emperor Taizu's name, delivered by the palace attendant Ding Zhaopu (丁昭溥) to Zhu Youzhen, who was then the commander of the imperial guards at Daliang, ordering Zhu Youzhen to kill Zhu Youwen. Zhu Youzhen subsequently carried out the order. Zhu Yougui then blamed the assassination on Zhu Youwen and took the throne. After Zhu Youzhen rose against Zhu Yougui in 913 and took the throne (after Zhu Yougui, believing the situation to be hopeless, committed suicide), he publicly rehabilitated Zhu Youwen and restored Zhu Youwen's titles.

== Notes and references ==
- History of the Five Dynasties, vol. 12.
- New History of the Five Dynasties, vol. 13.
- Zizhi Tongjian, vols. 266, 267, 268.
