= Jing Xiang (politician) =

Chinese Tang dynasty statesman

Jing Xiang (敬翔) (died November 20, 923?), courtesy name Zizhen (子振), formally the Marquess of Pingyang (平陽侯), was the chief strategist of the late Chinese Tang dynasty warlord Zhu Quanzhong, who assisted Zhu in his consolidation of central China, which Zhu eventually established as a new Later Liang (as its Emperor Taizu) to replace Tang. Jing served in prominent roles in Emperor Taizu's administration and later administrations of his sons Zhu Yougui and Zhu Zhen, although neither listened much to Jing. After Li Cunxu the Prince of Jin—the chief rival state to Later Liang—launched a surprise attack on the Later Liang capital Daliang in 923, Zhu Zhen, facing defeat and capture, committed suicide, ending Later Liang. Jing, hearing of the state's destruction, also committed suicide.

== Background ==
It is not known when Jing Xiang was born. His family was from Fengyi (馮翊, in modern Weinan, Shaanxi) and was descended from the middle-Tang dynasty chancellor Jing Hui. His great-grandfather Jing Wan (敬琬) and father Jing Gun (敬袞) both served as prefectural prefects, while his grandfather Jing Xin (敬忻) served as a prefectural governmental administrator. It was said that Jing Xiang, in his youth, was studious, and was particularly skillful at using knife-pens (i.e., knives that were used to carve text on bamboo). During the middle of Qianfu era (874–879) of Emperor Xizong, Jing submitted himself for imperial examinations but was not able to pass in the Jinshi class.

After the major agrarian rebel Huang Chao captured the Tang imperial capital Chang'an around the new year 881, Jing left the Guanzhong region (i.e., the region around Chang'an), eventually going to Xuanwu Circuit (宣武, headquartered in modern Kaifeng, Henan), where, after Huang was expelled from the Chang'an region by Tang forces, his former subordinate Zhu Quanzhong, who had turned against him and became a Tang general, had been made the military governor (jiedushi). Zhu's assistant in his role as governor (觀察使, Guanchashi), Wang Fa (王發), was from the same locale as Jing, and Jing initially went to follow Wang. Wang treated him well, but had no opportunity to recommend him to Zhu. Jing, unable to distinguish himself, resorted to writing snippets of witty words and passing them around in Zhu's army. This impressed Zhu, who was not well-learned and did not like to read but who liked witty words. He thus summoned Jing to his presence and initially offered him an officer position. However, Jing did not want to be an army officer and requested a civilian position, and therefore was initially made the overseer of the communication station at Xuanwu, to be in charge of communiques with the imperial government and other circuits. During Zhu's subsequent campaigns against the rebel general Qin Zongquan, who declared himself emperor at Cai Prefecture (蔡州, in modern Zhumadian, Henan), Jing participated in the strategy sessions. Zhu was impressed by Jing's strategies, and after Qin's destruction became particularly trusting of Jing.

== As Zhu Quanzhong's chief strategist during the Tang dynasty ==
It was said that, because Zhu Quanzhong's thoughts and actions were unpredictable, other staff members often found it difficult to give him advice. Jing Xiang, however, was often able to anticipate what he was thinking and complement the parts that his own plans were lacking, further causing him to entrust Jing with greater responsibility. For example, in 889, when two of Zhu's generals, Zhu Zhen (朱珍, not the same person as the later emperor) and Li Tangbin (李唐賓) had a dispute while both were attacking Zhu Quanzhong's rival Shi Pu the military governor of Ganhua Circuit (感化, headquartered in modern Xuzhou, Jiangsu) and Zhu Zhen killed Li in anger, Jing, after receiving the news, did not immediately inform Zhu Quanzhong (because he did not want Zhu Quanzhong to make a rash reaction). Rather, he waited to the night to inform Zhu Quanzhong and then suggested to Zhu Quanzhong that he should arrest Li's wife and children to first comfort Zhu Zhen, before carrying out any actions against Zhu Zhen. Zhu Quanzhong accepted this decision, and Zhu Zhen did not rebel at the time; it was only later, when Zhu Quanzhong visited the army personally that he ordered Zhu Zhen arrested and executed.

By 893, Zhu Quanzhong's army was worn out after having put Shi under siege at Ganhua's capital Xu Prefecture (徐州) for years, and one of the staff members, Zhang Tao (張濤), had suggested to Zhu in a letter that the failure to capture Xu was the result of the army having been launched on a day of ill fortune. Zhu initially believed Zhang's words, but Jing pointed out that if these words spread, the army morale would collapse, so Zhu burned Zhang's letter. Subsequently, Zhu's general Pang Shigu (龐師古) was able to capture Xu, and Shi committed suicide.

At the time of Shi's death, Jing had just lost his wife. Meanwhile, one of Shi's beautiful concubines was a Lady Liu, who had previously been the wife of Shang Rang, a chancellor in Huang Chao's administration. Zhu initially took Lady Liu as a concubine himself, but later decided to award her to Jing as his new wife. However, after Lady Liu became Jing's wife, she continued to carry on close relationship, perhaps sexual, with Zhu; as a result, Jing initially distanced himself from her. She, in anger, pointed out to Jing that she had been the wife of a chancellor (i.e., Shang) and the concubine to an honored military governor, and that her relationship with Zhu was to ensure that he would continue to trust Jing deeply, and she offered to let him divorce her if he wanted to. Jing saw the wisdom and also did not want to offend Zhu, and therefore remained married to her. (Thereafter, during the time that Zhu was still a Tang warlord, Lady Liu was said to be just as influential on his policies as Jing was.)

In 903, when Zhu had seized Emperor Xizong's brother and successor Emperor Zhaozong back from Li Maozhen the military governor of Fengxiang Circuit (鳳翔, headquartered in modern Baoji, Shaanxi), where Emperor Zhaozong had been forcibly taken by the eunuch Han Quanhui, Zhu returned Emperor Zhaozong to Chang'an, and Emperor Zhaozong bestowed on Jing and a number of Zhu's subordinates honors for their participation in Zhu's campaign; he also personally welcomed Jing and another key staff member of Zhu's, Li Zhen, to the palace.

However, later in 903, Zhu and Emperor Zhaozong's chancellor Cui Yin, who had previously been allies, broke over Zhu's suspicion that Cui had his nephew Zhu Youlun (朱友倫) assassinated, whom Zhu had left in charge of the imperial guards at Chang'an. In 904, Zhu Quanzhong killed Cui and forced Emperor Zhaozong to move the capital to Luoyang. At a subsequent feast that Emperor Zhaozong held at the Luoyang palace, he initially invited Zhu to attend, but Zhu suspected Emperor Zhaozong of laying a trap for him; he therefore claimed to be already drunk and refused to attend. When Emperor Zhaozong said, "If Quanzhong does not wish to attend, let Jing Xiang come," Zhu hit Jing and stated, "Jing Xiang is also drunk!"

In 905, Zhu conquered the domains of two brothers who were warlords opposing him—Zhao Kuangning the military governor of Zhongyi Circuit (忠義, headquartered in modern Xiangyang, Hubei) and Zhao Kuangming the military governor of Jingnan Circuit (荊南, headquartered in modern Jingzhou, Hubei). He then, without initially planning it, decided to head east to attack Yang Xingmi the military governor of Huainan Circuit (淮南, headquartered in modern Yangzhou, Jiangsu). Jing advised him against it, pointing out that he had terrorized the other warlords already through his quick victory over the Zhaos, and that a failed campaign against Huainan would damage his reputation. Zhu, however, did not listen to Jing on this occasion, and regretted it after his attacks were repelled by Yang. However, it appeared that this was the exception, not the norm, for it was stated that Zhu's gradual consolidation of power was largely done with the advice of Jing.

== During Emperor Taizu's reign ==
In 907, Zhu Quanzhong had Emperor Zhaozong's son and successor Emperor Ai yield the throne to him, ending Tang and establishing Later Liang as its Emperor Taizu. He changed the name of Tang's office of palace communications (樞密院, Shumi Yuan) to Xuanzheng Yuan (宣政院) and transformed it from a eunuch-led organization to one led by regular officials, and he made Jing its acting director. Meanwhile, at Jing's and Li Zhen's suggestion, Emperor Taizu ordered 15 senior Tang officials into retirement, believing Jing's assertion that they were betrayers of the Tang cause and could not be trusted. Historians generally credited Jing for the general efficiency of Emperor Taizu's administration, despite Emperor Taizu's impulsiveness and, as he aged, violent behavior. For example, the Song dynasty historian Sima Guang, in his Zizhi Tongjian, commented, adopting a similar view from the History of the Five Dynasties:

Jing Xiang thought deeply and did not express himself easily. He was intelligent and capable in strategies. He served on the emperor's staff for 30 years, and during that time, the emperor entrusted both military and civilian matters to him. He used all of his heart and diligence and did not rest day or night. He himself stated that he would only be able to rest while riding a horse. The emperor was violent and difficult to approach, and no one could predict his actions. Only Jing was able to discern his wishes. If there was something the emperor should not do, Jing would not publicly state so, but he would just express some doubt. When he did so, the emperor would realize Jing's opposition and change his opinion. The actions that the emperor took during the time of the dynastic transition was largely out of Jing's counsel.

In 911, Emperor Taizu bestowed the honorific title of Guanglu Daifu (光祿大夫) on Jing and made him the acting minister of defense (兵部尚書, Bingbu Shangshu) and a chief imperial scholar at Jinluan Hall (金鑾殿). (Jing was the first person to receive that latter title.) He also created Jing the Marquess of Pingyang.

In 912, Emperor Taizu became seriously ill, and he summoned Jing to his presence to entrust a number of orders to him. One of those orders was to send Emperor Taizu's son Zhu Yougui the Prince of Ying out of the capital Luoyang to be the prefect of Lai Prefecture. Zhu Yougui, receiving the news, believed that Emperor Taizu's intent was to kill him, while passing the throne to his adoptive brother Zhu Youwen the Prince of Bo. He therefore entered the palace and assassinated Emperor Taizu. He issued an edict in Emperor Taizu's name putting Zhu Youwen to death; he then took the throne himself.

== After Emperor Taizu's reign ==
Zhu Yougui, after taking the throne, believed that, since Jing Xiang was a close associate of his father's, leaving Jing in charge of the office of palace communications would be dangerous, but as Jing had a good reputation, he did not want to cause the people to be disappointed in seeing Jing demoted. Therefore, he gave Jing a technical promotion—to be a chancellor with the designation Tong Zhongshu Menxia Pingzhangshi (同中書門下平章事)—and also Zhongshu Shilang (中書侍郎), but removed him from the office of palace communications, replacing him with Li Zhen. Jing, realizing that Zhu Yougui did not trust him, often claimed to be ill and did not involve himself in policy decisions.

In 913, Zhu Yougui's brother Zhu Youzhen the Prince of Jun carried out a counter-coup; when Zhu Yougui saw that he was nearing defeat, he committed suicide, and Zhu Youzhen became emperor. (Zhu Youzhen then changed his name to Zhu Zhen.)

While Jing and Li Zhen continued to be the most honored officials in Zhu Zhen's administration, Zhu Zhen largely entrusted actual policy decisions to his brother-in-law Zhao Yan, two brothers of his deceased wife Consort Zhang Zhang Handing (張漢鼎) and Zhang Hanjie (張漢傑), and Consort Zhang's cousins Zhang Hanlun (張漢倫) and Zhang Hanrong (張漢融). It was said that Jing's and Li Zhen's suggestions were often ignored, and Li Zhen, as a result, often claimed illness. Thereafter, the Later Liang administration began to deteriorate.

In 917, Zhu Zhen, who had moved the capital from Luoyang to Daliang, prepared for a grand ceremony to offer sacrifices to heaven and earth south of Luoyang at Zhao's suggestion, against Jing's advice that given Later Liang was locked in a war with its major rival Jin, the resources should be better conserved. When Zhu was at Luoyang, Jin's prince Li Cunxu took the opportunity to capture the border outpost Yangliu (楊劉, in modern Liaocheng, Shandong), on the south bank of the Yellow River, which largely formed the boundary between Later Liang and Jin at that time (Later Liang to the south, Jin to the north), after Later Liang had lost large amounts of territory north of the Yellow River in the preceding years. News of Yangliu's fall reached Luoyang, along with rumors that Jin forces had already captured Daliang. Zhu, terrified, cancelled the ceremony and returned to Daliang. After Zhu returned to Daliang, Jin forces withdrew from the region after pillaging Yun (鄆州, in modern Tai'an, Shandong) and Pu (濮州, in modern Heze, Shandong) Prefectures. In light of this surprise attack, Jing submitted a petition to Zhu:

The empire has suffered repeated defeats and continually lost territory. Your Imperial Majesty resides in the palace, and the only people that you discuss policies with are your close associates. Who can accurately judge the issues of battles with our enemy? When the deceased emperor [(i.e., Emperor Taizu)] was still alive, he had territory to the north of the River and personally commanded capable generals, and he was unable to achieve final victory. Now the enemy has reached Yun Prefecture and Your Imperial Majesty does not pay attention. I, your subject, heard that Li Yazi [(i.e., Li Cunxu, with "Yazi" being Li Cunxu's nickname)], after he took his title, has spent the last 10 years putting himself on the frontline, bearing the risks of the arrows and boulders as he sieged cities and battled in the field. When he attacked Yangliu, he personally bore firewood and stepped in front of his soldiers, such that he was able to quickly capture Yangliu. Your Imperial Majesty is meek and civil, not showing urgency. You entrust the army to generals such like He Gui and expect them to expel the enemy; your subject does not believe this is possible. Your Imperial Majesty should consult the senior officials and think of alternative strategies. Otherwise, I fear that nothing will be accomplished. Even though I, your subject, am generally fearful of battles, I have received much grace from the empire. If Your Imperial Majesty cannot find someone more capable, I am willing to go to the frontline myself to command the operations.

However, Zhao and the Zhangs argued that Jing was simply full of frustration, and persuaded Zhu not to follow Jing's suggestion.

In 921, Wang Rong the Prince of Zhao, a major ally of Jin, was assassinated by his adoptive son Zhang Wenli, who, anticipating that Li Cunxu would attack him, sought to submit to and seek aid from Later Liang. Jing pointed out that this was a golden opportunity to counterattack against Jin and recapture the territory lost, but Zhao and the Zhangs argued that Zhang Wenli was merely using Later Liang to accomplish his own goals and that Later Liang had no spare troops to aid Zhang Wenli. Zhu, listening to them, rejected Jing's suggestions. Zhang Wenli (and, subsequently, after his death, his son Zhang Chujin) therefore received no Later Liang aid and were subsequently defeated by Li Cunxu. Li Cunxu thus was able to absorb Zhao territory into Jin.

In spring 923, Li Cunxu, who had declared himself the emperor of a new Later Tang (as its Emperor Zhuangzong), sent his adoptive brother Li Siyuan to capture Yun Prefecture in a surprise attack—thus leaving no natural defenses between Yun Prefecture and Daliang. Jing, seeing that the empire was in danger, went to see Zhu and showed him a rope, stating that if the emperor would not accept his suggestion—making the general Wang Yanzhang the commander of the operations resisting Later Tang—he would hang himself in the emperor's presence. Zhu agreed this time and made Wang the commander of the forces against Jin. Wang was subsequently able to recapture Desheng (德勝, in modern Puyang, Henan), another important outpost on the Yellow River, from Later Tang and briefly cut off the communications between Li Siyuan and the main Later Tang territory, hoping to force Li Siyuan to flee. However, Zhao and the Zhangs, who supported the general Duan Ning instead, continuously defamed Wang, and Zhu thereafter replaced Wang with Duan, despite repeated objections from Jing and Li Zhen. Subsequently, Later Tang was able to retain Yun Prefecture, despite its precarious communication line.

Once in command, Duan drew an ambitious plan to counterattack against Later Tang advances. Under Duan's plans, Duan and Du Yanqiu would lead the main forces and confront Later Tang's Emperor Zhuangzong; Huo Yanwei would take an army and head toward Later Tang's Anguo (安國, headquartered in modern Xingtai, Hebei) and Chengde (成德, headquartered in modern Shijiazhuang, Hebei, i.e., formerly Zhao territory) Circuits; Dong Zhang would launch an attack from Kuangyi Circuit (匡義, headquartered in modern Changzhi, Shanxi)—formerly Jin territory, but which had become Later Liang territory after Emperor Zhuangzong's cousin Li Jitao, who ruled it, defected to Later Liang earlier in the year—toward Later Tang's main territory around Taiyuan; and Wang Yanzhang and Zhang Hanjie would head toward Yun Prefecture. In winter 923, before Duan was able to actually implement his four-pronged attack, however, Emperor Zhuangzong took his army south of the Yellow River to rendezvous with Li Siyuan; together, they defeated and captured Wang and Zhang Hanjie (whose army was the weakest of the four prongs), and then directly headed for Daliang, with Duan's main force trapped north of the Yellow River (having crossed it earlier in the year in preparation of launching the four-prong attack) and unable to come to Daliang's aid.

Hearing of Wang's defeat, Zhu, desperate by this point, summoned Jing to the palace and apologized to him for not listening to him, asking him whether he had any strategies left for defending Daliang. Jing wept and responded:

I, your subject, had long received the grace from the deceased emperor. Even though I carry the title of chancellor, in reality, I am just an old slave of the Zhu household. I serve Your Imperial Majesty as a slave would his young master. Everything that I have offered you so far were true words out of my faithfulness. When Your Imperial Majesty wanted to commission Duan Ning, I spoke gravely against it, but the wicked men encouraged you into doing so, and that led to the disaster of today. Now Tang forces are about to arrive. Duan Ning is trapped north of the River and cannot come to our aid. If I suggest to Your Imperial Majesty to leave the capital to avoid the barbarian [(i.e., Later Tang, given that the Later Tang imperial house was of Shatuo stock)] attack, Your Imperial Majesty would surely not listen to me. If I suggest to Your Imperial Majesty that you engage the enemy in a last stand, Your Imperial Majesty would not dare to do so. Given that this is the situation, even if Zhang Liang and Chen Ping [(both key strategists for Emperor Gaozu of Han)] were to come alive again today, they cannot help Your Imperial Majesty. Your subject requests that you put me to death first, so that I would not see the fall of the imperial temples.

Both he and Zhu cried bitterly, but could think of nothing else to say. Subsequently, Zhu had his imperial guard officer Huangfu Lin (皇甫麟) kill him, ending Later Liang. (Huangfu then killed himself.)

Upon Emperor Zhuangzong's arrival at Daliang, he issued an edict generally pardoning the Later Liang officials. Hearing of the edict, Li Zhen went to see Jing and suggested that they go see Emperor Zhuangzong together to beg for pardon. Jing responded, "Both of us were Liang chancellors. We could not correct the emperor's poor governance, and we could not save the dynasty from destruction. If the new emperor questions us on these grounds, how are we going to respond?" The next morning, Jing's servants informed him that Li Zhen had already gone to the palace. Jing sighed and stated, "Li Zhen is no man. The Zhus and the new emperor have been enemies for generations. Now, the empire has been destroyed, and the emperor is dead. Even if the new emperor would spare us, how can we still enter the Jianguo Gate [(建國門, the gate to the Later Liang imperial palace)]?" He therefore hanged himself. Within a few days, Emperor Zhuangzong issued another edict which, while generally confirming the pardon, ordered that Jing (whose death he apparently did not know), Li Zhen, Zhao, the Zhangs, the Later Liang general Zhu Gui (朱珪), and the Khitan prince Yelü Sala'abo (耶律撒剌阿撥) (the brother of the Khitan emperor Emperor Taizu of Liao, who had previously rebelled against the Khitan emperor and fled to Emperor Zhuangzong, and then re-defected to Later Liang) be put to death, along with their families. Jing's family was therefore slaughtered.

Jingxiang was Zhu Wen's primary accomplice in the demise of the Tang Dynasty. Slaughtered the royal family and court ministers. Everyone knows that people and gods are angry. Although Jingxiang committed suicide now, it is not enough to comfort the victim's spirit in heaven. He should be Kill the whole family together with Li Zhen.

— Emperor Zhuangzong

== Notes and references ==
- History of the Five Dynasties, vol. 18.
- New History of the Five Dynasties, vol. 21.
- Zizhi Tongjian, vols. 257, 258, 259, 264, 265, 266, 268, 269, 270, 271, 272.
