= Zhao Chou =

Zhao Chou (Chinese: 趙犨; 824–889) was a warlord late in the Chinese Tang dynasty, whose power base was at Chen Prefecture (陳州, in modern Zhumadian, Henan). He was a reliable ally of Zhu Quanzhong the military governor (jiedushi) of Xuanwu Circuit (宣武, headquartered in modern Kaifeng, Henan), and his son Zhao Yan became a son-in-law of Zhu's and an official of Later Liang after Zhu established the new dynasty.

== Background ==
Zhao Chou was born in 824, during the reign of Emperor Jingzong. His ancestors had originally been from Tianshui, but by Zhao Chou's time had served for three generations as army officers at Chen Prefecture. His great-grandfather was named Zhao Bin (趙賓); his grandfather was named Zhao Yingqi (趙英奇); and his father was named Zhao Shuwen (趙叔文). It was said that Zhao Chou was strong in his youth. When Zhao Shuwen served on the campaign against the rebel warlord Liu Zhen of Zhaoyi Circuit (昭義, headquartered in modern Changzhi, Shanxi) during the reign of Emperor Jingzong's brother Emperor Wuzong, Zhao Chou served under him with distinction, and subsequently was given an officer position in the army of Zhongwu Circuit (忠武, then headquartered in modern Xuchang, Henan), which Chen Prefecture belonged to.

During the subsequent reign of Emperor Xizong, the Tang realm was thrown into chaos due to agrarian rebellions. Zhao Chou again served with distinction on a campaign against the agrarian rebel Wang Xianzhi. However, the region was thrown into even more complete chaos after the agrarian rebel Huang Chao captured the imperial capital Chang'an around the new year 881, forcing Emperor Xizong to flee to Chengdu. It was said that the soldiers at Chen wanted Zhao to be their commander, and so they submitted a request to the military governor of Zhongwu; after the military governor relayed their request to Emperor Xizong, Emperor Xizong commissioned Zhao as the prefect of Chen.

== Defense of Chen Prefecture against Huang Chao ==
Meanwhile, as the Tang generals began to gather their forces to force Huang Chao out of Chang'an, Zhao Chou began to anticipate the likelihood that Huang, who had by that point claimed the title of Emperor of Qi but who was suffering defeats at Tang generals' hands, would abandon Chang'an and head east, particularly since Huang bore particular resentment to Zhongwu Circuit due to the prior engagements that he had with the Zhongwu army. In preparation, he repaired the city walls and stored excess food supplies, and ordered the people living within 60 li (about 30 kilometers) to move into the city. He divided his soldiers and had his brothers Zhao Chang (趙昶) and Zhao Xu (趙珝), as well as his sons Zhao Lu (趙麓) and Zhao Lin command them.

In spring 883, Huang, under the pressure of the Tang general Li Keyong, abandoned Chang'an and fled east. He initially attacked Tang's Fengguo Circuit (奉國, headquartered at Cai Prefecture (蔡州), also in modern Zhumadian); the military governor of Fengguo Circuit, Qin Zongquan, submitted to Huang and joined his forces to Huang's. Huang then sent his general Meng Kai (孟楷) to attack Chen Prefecture. Zhao Chou initially feigned weakness to draw Meng in, and then ambushed Meng, killing him. Huang, angry over Meng's death, put Chen under siege for months, but could not capture it, and during the siege, Zhao made repeated surprise attacks against Huang's army. He also sought aid from the nearby military governors; among those, Zhou Ji the military governor of Zhongwu, Shi Pu the military governor of Ganhua Circuit (感化, headquartered in modern Xuzhou, Jiangsu), and Zhu Quanzhong the military governor of Xuanwu all sent aid. However, they were all unable to lift the siege that Huang's army was putting on Chen. Fearing the strength of Huang's army, they sought aid from Li Keyong, who had by then been made the military governor of Hedong Circuit (河東, headquartered in modern Taiyuan, Shanxi). Li Keyong crossed the Yellow River south and engaged Huang's army. Fearing Li Keyong's strength, Huang lifted the siege on Chen after some 300 days, in summer 884.

== Defense of Chen Prefecture against Qin Zongquan ==
However, after Huang Chao's subsequent death, Qin Zongquan did not resubmit to Tang authority; rather, he began pillaging some 20 prefectures around his circuit, and would eventually declare himself emperor of a new state. Despite Chen's military weakness by that point, Zhao Chou held out against Qin, and Qin could not capture Chen. For Zhao's accomplishments, Emperor Xizong gave him the title of military governor of Fengguo. As Zhu Quanzhong repeatedly sent him aid, Zhao became a close ally of Zhu's, and did whatever Zhu asked of him; he also had his son Zhao Lin (whose name was changed to Zhao Yan by this point) marry one of Zhu's daughters (the future Princess Changle) to cement the alliance.

In 888, after Zhu repeatedly defeated Qin, Qin's own subordinates overthrew him and delivered him to Zhu, who delivered him to Chang'an to be executed. After Qin's defeat, Emperor Xizong bestowed the honorary chancellor title of Tong Zhongshu Menxia Pingzhangshi (同中書門下平章事) on Zhao and also made him the military governor of Zhongwu, moving the capital from Xu Prefecture to Chen.

By that time, however, Zhao was very ill. He entrusted the matters of the circuit to his brother Zhao Chang and submitted a petition, seeking retirement. As a result, Emperor Xizong issued an edict making Zhao Chang the military governor of Zhongwu. Zhao Chou died soon thereafter.

== Notes and references ==
- New Book of Tang, vol. 189.
- History of the Five Dynasties, vol. 14.
- New History of the Five Dynasties, vol. 42.
- Zizhi Tongjian, vols. 255, 256, 258.
