= Zhu Wen =

Chinese warlord and Later Liang emperor from 907 to 912

Emperor Taizu of Later Liang 後梁太祖
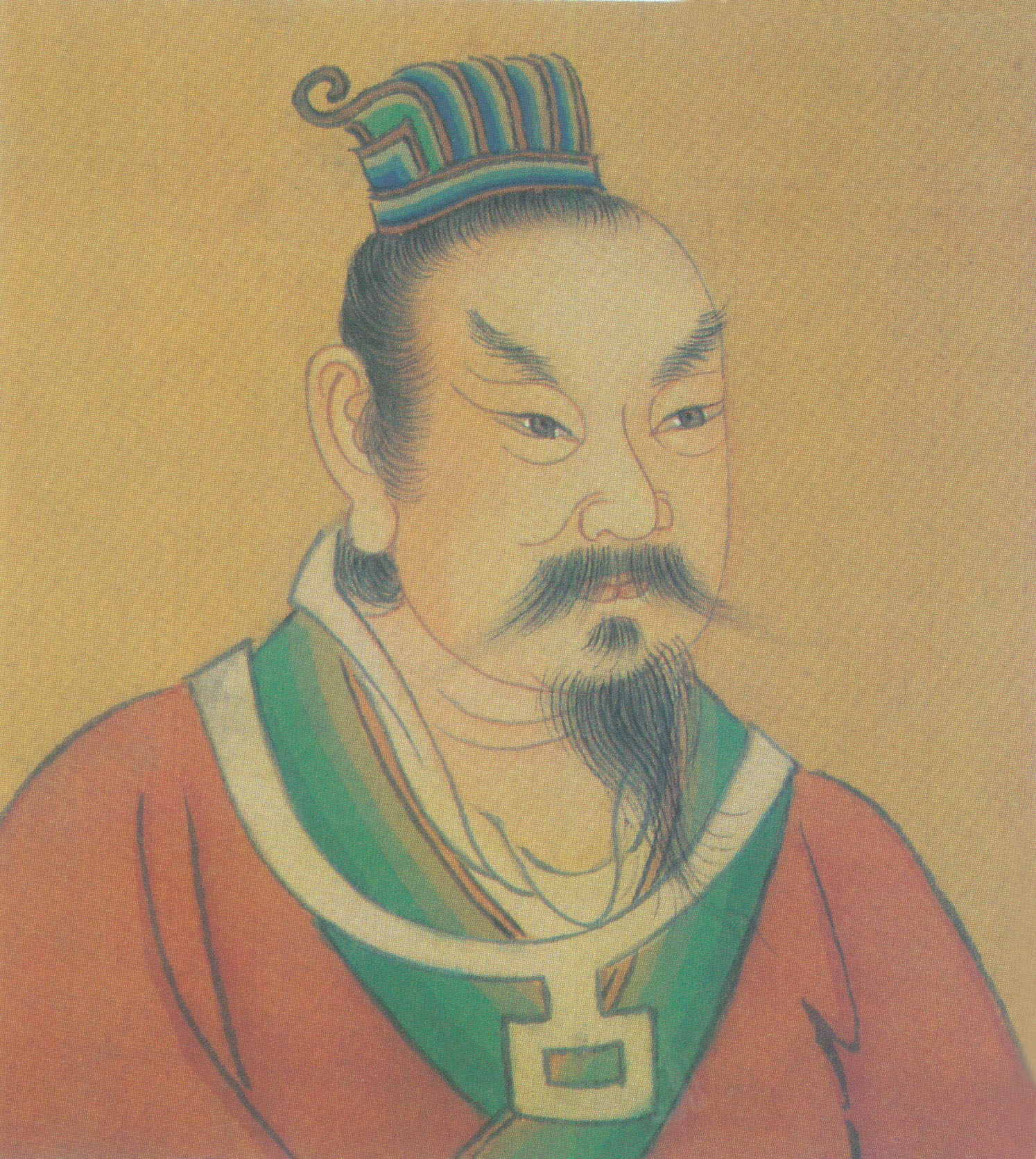
- Qing Dynasty portrait of Zhu Wen

Emperor of the Later Liang dynasty
- Reign: June 1, 907 – July 18, 912
- Successor: Zhu Yougui
- Born: December 5, 852; Dangshan, Songzhou, Tang China
- Died: July 18, 912 (aged 59); Kaifeng
- Burial: Xuan Mausoleum (宣陵; in modern Yichuan County, Henan)
Full name
- Family name: Zhū (朱); Given name: Originally Wēn (溫), later Quánzhōng (全忠); (changed 882), later Huǎng (晃) (changed 907)
Era dates
- Kāipíng (開平): 907–910; Qiánhuà (乾化): 911–912
Posthumous name
- Emperor Shénwǔ Yuánshèng Xiào (神武元聖孝皇帝)
Temple name
- Tàizǔ (太祖)
- House: Zhu
- Dynasty: Later Liang
- Occupation: Military general, monarch, politician

Emperor Taizu of Later Liang (後梁太祖), personal name Zhu Quanzhong (朱全忠) (December 5, 852 – July 18, 912), né Zhu Wen (朱溫), name later changed to Zhu Huang (朱晃), nickname Zhu San (朱三, literally, "the third Zhu"), was the first emperor of the Later Liang dynasty. He was a Jiedushi (military governor) and warlord who in 907 overthrew the Tang dynasty and established the Later Liang dynasty, ruling as its first emperor, ushering in the era of the Five Dynasties and Ten Kingdoms. The last two Tang emperors, Emperor Zhaozong of Tang (Li Jie) and Emperor Ai of Tang (Li Zuo), who "ruled" as his puppets from 903 to 907, were both murdered by him.

Zhu Wen initially served as a general under the rebel Huang Chao, but defected to the weakened Tang dynasty in 882. Taking advantage of the total chaos in the wake of Huang Chao's defeat, Zhu Wen was able to conquer parts of central China after destroying warlords such as Qin Zongquan, Shi Pu, Zhu Xuan, and Zhu Jin, although most of Shaanxi, Shanxi, and Hebei remained outside his reach, controlled by rival states Qi, Jin, and Yan respectively. Most of his later campaigns were directed at the Shatuo-ruled Jin state (later to become the Later Tang) based in Shanxi, but they failed because of the Jin leaders, Li Keyong and his son Li Cunxu. Due to his emphasis on unifying the north, Taizu was not able to make any inroads into southern China. Southern China came to be controlled by about seven different states, and the rulers of Yang Wu and Former Shu were not submissive to him.

Zhu Wen used a combination of strict enforcement, ruthless violence and solicitation to ensure his officers stayed loyal to him. Zhu Wen was also a notorious sexual predator who raped not only the wives of his officers Yang Chongben and Zhang Quanyi, but also his own daughters-in-law. Zhu Wen's reign came to an end in 912 when he was murdered in his palace by his son Zhu Yougui, whom he had begotten with a prostitute.

== Early career ==
Zhu Wen was born the youngest of three sons, Quanyu, Cun and Wen. His father, Zhu Cheng (朱誠) was an instructor in the Five Classics in Dangshan County, which at that time belonged to Songzhou. There was also a younger sister who married one Yuan Jingchu (袁敬初) of Xiayi County (下邑), near Dangshan, whose father and grandfather had held office on a provincial and prefectural level, but who claimed ancestry from the prominent middle-Tang official Yuan Shuji. (Her son with Yuan, Yuan Xiangxian, would later be an important general during Zhu Wen's Later Liang and the succeeding Later Tang.) Zhu Cheng died while Wen was still a boy, likely about 864, or after. His widow brought her three sons to live in the household of Liu Chong (劉崇) of Xiao County, Xuzhou. Zhu Cheng's mother is known to have been surnamed Liu. It is therefore possible that Liu Chong was a relative of Zhu Wen's grandmother. If this was in fact the case, Zhu Cheng's origin can not have been too obscure since the Liu family was the leading family in the area. The marriage of the daughter into the Yuan family also indicate a family of some standing.

Zhu Wen was brought up to be a family retainer or manor steward, but it is said that the people in the Liu household did not view him highly, except Liu Chong's mother, who in fact had to intercede whenever Liu Chong, displeased with Zhu Wen, caned him. Zhu instead went on to form his own bandit gang, one of many operating between the Yellow and Huai Rivers. In about 877 Zhu Wen and the second brother, Zhu Cun (朱存), joined the rebel army of Huang Chao when it fought its way through the region. Cun was later killed in battle, but Wen rose through the ranks until given a separate command following Huang Chao's capture of the imperial capital Chang'an in January 881.

With this army Zhu Wen attacked and captured nearby Tong Prefecture (同州, in modern Weinan, Shaanxi), becoming defense commissioner of that prefecture. Many of the military governors had submitted to Huang Chao following his capture of Chang'an, but soon reverted to the Tang court once they realized that cause was not yet lost. By 882 Huang Chao was effectively surrounded, controlling only two prefectures outside Chang'an, one of which was Zhu Wen's Tong Prefecture. Wen now found the time opportune to change sides. After first assassinating his military overseer Yan Shi (嚴實), sent by Huang Chao to guard against just such a possibility, Zhu Wen surrendered to the Hezhong Circuit (河中, headquartered in modern Yuncheng, Shanxi)'s military governor (Jiedushi), Wang Chongrong. As reward for his timely defection Emperor Xizong of Tang appointed Zhu Wen Grand General of the Imperial Guards and deputy field commander of the armies stationed at Hezhong, also conferring the new personal name Quanzhong – "wholeheartedly loyal."

On May 3, 883 Zhu was appointed prefect of Bian Prefecture (汴州, in modern Kaifeng, Henan) and military governor of Xuanwu Circuit (宣武, headquartered at Bian Prefecture), the appointment to take effect after the expected recapture of Chang'an. It was already known that Huang planned to escape east to Henan through the Lantian pass and the court needed someone to defend the canal route from the south-eastern granaries. As a former rebel with local knowledge of the area in question, Zhu was a natural choice. It could not have hurt his chances either that Quanzhong had actively sought the patronage of Wang Chongrong, one of the chief architects of the imperial offensive, whom he took to calling "uncle" (Quanzhong's mother was also named Wang). Tang forces entered Chang'an half a month after Zhu's appointment and on August 9 Zhu duly arrived at Bian.

== Xuanwu governor ==
=== Campaigns against Huang Chao ===
Zhu Quanzhong arrived at Bian more than three months after his appointment. The delay probably was related to various duties assigned to him in between, but may also have been due to bargaining over how many men of his own men he was to be allowed to bring with him to his new command. When he surrendered, Zhu brought with him an army of several thousand men, but by the time he left for Bianzhou this army must have been largely dispersed or absorbed into the imperial armies, for he brought with him to Bian only a few hundred men including a core of at least eighty military retainers. These retainers would provide crucial leadership in his early years at Bian. The majority of them had probably served with Zhu under Huang Chao, but some, such as Pang Shigu (龐師古), were new recruits. To the Xuanwu command belonged one of the strongest armies in the region and Zhu now set about making sure that this army become loyal to him personally. The army consisted of two sections: the governor's guard and the main field force, the former acting as the governor's bodyguards. Zhu appointed several of his military retainers as guards officers, such as Ding Hui who was made administrator, and Hu Zhen (胡真) who was made a commander. Zhu Quanzhong's eldest son, Zhu Youyu (朱友裕) was also made an officer, though at this time he was yet a boy. The most important of these appointments was Zhu Zhen (朱珍), who was given special responsibility for selection, training and reorganization. Zhu Quanzhong did retain the hereditary officers in the guards and main army, but the reorganizations and preparations for war against Huang Chao had been entrusted to his own men. The Xuanwu army consisted largely of infantry. Having seen the effectiveness of the Shatou Turks' tribal cavalry during the recapture of Chang'an, Zhu ordered the formation of his own cavalry units. Command of the initial force was entrusted his military retainer Pang. Later as new units were formed, officers were both selected from men who had come with Zhu or recruited locally.

Zhu soon had the opportunity to test the mettle of his new army. After his flight through Lantian Pass, Huang Chao attacked Cai Prefecture (蔡州, in modern Zhumadian, Henan), and the military governor of Fengguo Circuit (奉國, headquartered at Cai Prefecture), Qin Zongquan, defected to the rebels. Huang then proceeded to attack Chen Prefecture (陳州, in modern Zhumadian), but there the prefect, Zhao Chou, decided to resist even as his prefectural capital was put under siege. With Huang held up at Chen and his armies also meeting resistance in other prefectures, Zhu joined with the other governors of the region in early 884 to call in the man who had spearheaded the recapture of Chang'an – Li Keyong, military governor of Hedong (河東, headquartered in modern Taiyuan, Shanxi) and chief of the Shatuo Turks. In spring 884 the combined forces of Zhu and Li Keyong routed Huang's generals and forced him to abandon the siege of Chen. Suffering a string of defeats from the governmental armies, Huang again managed to flee eastward, but his career had now run its course. He was hunted down and killed later that summer. The final defeat of Huang Chao brought about the surrender of several rebel commanders to Zhu, strengthening his forces and providing him with a second group of officers who would serve him loyally in the years to come.

Soon after Huang's defeat a quarrel occurred between Zhu and Li Keyong, and when Li Keyong passed through Bian, Zhu attempted to have Keyong assassinated during the night of June 11, 884. The attempt failed and Li Keyong escaped back to his own capital at Taiyuan from where he lodged a complaint in the imperial court. In his reply, Zhu claimed to have had no foreknowledge of the incident, but explained that the plan had been hatched by his army commander Yang Yanhong (楊彥洪) in collusion with a representative of the court and that he had since had Yang executed. (In reality, Yang was killed by friendly fire (an arrow fired by Zhu himself) during the attempt to kill Li Keyong.) The Tang court, which by this time had little actual power left, was unwilling to choose sides between the two warlords and decided not to investigate the matter further, merely investing Li Keyong Prince of Longxi. This was the start of a forty-years long struggle that was to outlast both Zhu and Li Keyong.

=== Campaigns against Qin Zongquan ===
The death of Huang Chao was not the end of rebellion against Tang imperial sovereignty. Qin Zongquan took over the leadership and declared himself emperor. Qin expanded his territory in all directions, even capturing the eastern capital Luoyang, in 885–886. With the withdrawal of Li Keyong's armies, Zhu was no longer strong enough to defeat them. No help could be gotten from the court either since Emperor Xizong had again been forced to flee Chang'an after quarreling with Zhu's former patron Wang Chongrong. The lack of a central authority left the initiative to Zhu and the other governors.

In Autumn 884, Emperor Xizong bestowed titles on Zhu as honorary dignitary for education with ministerial standing and elevated him to Marquess of Pei. In 885 Zhu married his daughter, the future Princess Changle, to Zhao Yan, son of Zhao Chou, who was already indebted to Zhu for breaking the siege of Huang Chao. With this alliance Quanzhong gained an important buffer between Bian and the rebel capital at Cai. A further opportunity to strengthen his position came in December 886 when the Yicheng Circuit (義成, headquartered in modern Anyang, Henan) army, headquartered at Hua Prefecture (滑州), mutinied against the court-chosen governor, An Shiru (安師儒). An suppressed the mutiny, but Zhu then attacked, and easily captured Hua, killing An and commissioning Hu Zhen as An's replacement. In doing so, Zhu also warded off a rival attempt by Zhu Xuan the military governor of Tianping Circuit (天平, headquartered in modern Tai'an, Shandong)—an ally of Zhu Quanzhong's—to take over Yicheng.

The Yicheng army was reorganized by transferring some of its officers and men to the Xuanwu army and appointing Xuanwu officers to command the rest. Large parts of the Yicheng army had to be left at Hua to guard the Yellow River, but Zhu Quanzhong had gained a strategic reserve. In January 887 the Emperor invested Zhu Quanzhong Prince of Wuxing.

Having beaten off two rebel attacks, Zhu Quanzhong in June/July 886 sent a cavalry commander, Guo Yan (郭言), to attack Qin's capital Cai Prefecture. The attack failed and in late 886 Qin began a campaign against Zhu, heading toward Bian and intending to capture it. In response, Zhu sent Zhu Zhen to the east to recruit additional troops outside his own territory. This served the double purpose of expanding Zhu's armies and easing the supply situation at Bian. During this period, Guo was sent westward into rebel controlled territory. Defeating a major bandit gang, Guo Yen recruited many of the survivors and then fought his way back to Bianzhou with the recruits, the whole expedition lasting about six months. Zhu Zhen, meanwhile, headed toward the comparatively peaceful Pinglu Circuit (平盧, headquartered in modern Weifang, Shandong). Defeating the Pinglu army, Zhu Zhen proceeded to recruit the men of the region and seize horses, returning to Bian in spring 887 after only two months, bringing with him, according to the Zizhi Tongjian, ten thousand recruits and one thousand horse. These numbers might be exaggerated, but Zhu Quanzhong's total force might well have reached thirty thousand personnel by this time.

By May/June 887 Zhu felt strong enough to counterattack. He called in the Yicheng army, and asked for, and received, aid from his two neighbouring "brother" governors, Zhu Xuan and Zhu Xuan's cousin, Zhu Jin of Taining Circuit (泰寧, headquartered in modern Jining, Shandong). Halfway through a banquet Zhu Quanzhong suddenly launched a sally from Bian. Taken by surprise by the sally and the approach of the armies of Tianping and Taining, the besieging army was routed. Following these defeats several prefectures defected from Qin. No longer in danger from the rebels, Zhu Quanzhong was ready to start the subjugation of Henan to his own authority.

=== Conquest of Henan ===
Zhu Quanzhong's alliance with Zhu Xuan and Zhu Jin did not last long. Even as their armies were returning eastward, Zhu Quanzhong accused Zhu Xuan and Zhu Jin of luring eastwards deserters from his own army. With these accusations as justifications, Zhu Quanzhong launched an offensive against Zhu Jin, and his chief commander Zhu Zhen captured Cao Prefecture (曹州, in modern Heze, Shandong) and apprehending its prefect Qiu Hongli while Zhang Guiba (張歸霸) routed Zhu Jin in battle at Jinxiang (金鄉, in modern Jining) and overrun Pu Prefecture (濮州, also in modern Heze). An attempt by Zhu Zhen to seize Tianping's capital Yun Prefecture (鄆州) itself is repelled with loss however, and later both Cao and Pu Prefectures had to be abandoned.

Meanwhile, to the south, Gao Pian, military governor of Huainan Circuit (淮南, headquartered in modern Yangzhou, Jiangsu), had been killed in a mutiny and the Tang court conferred on Zhu Quanzhong concurrent powers as military governor of Huainan. Zhu Quanzhong sent a deputy, Li Fan (李璠), to take control of the circuit, but on arrival Li Fan found Yang Xingmi, one of Guo Pian's generals, in control of the provincial capital Yang Prefecture (揚州). Yang, while receiving Zhu's emissary Zhang Tingfan (張廷範), refused to accept Li Fan as the acting military governor. With Shi Pu the military governor of Ganhua (感化, headquartered in modern Xuzhou, Jiangsu) also displeased because he was not given the Huainan command and launching troops to stop Li Fan and Guo Yan (who was escorting Li Fan) from reaching Yang Prefecture, Zhu had to abandon plans to take over Huainan. Meanwhile, following the defection of one of Qin Zongquan's generals, Zhao Deyin of Shannan East Circuit (山南東道, headquartered in modern Xiangyang, Hubei, renamed Zhongyi (忠義) by Tang after Zhao's defection), to the Tang cause, Zhu's armies laid siege to Cai.

To purchase supplies for the war against the rebels Zhu sent a military administrator north with 10,000 taels of silver to buy grain from Le Yanzhen, military governor of Weibo Circuit (魏博, headquartered in modern Handan, Hebei). However, this mission coincided with a mutiny of the Le's guard during which Zhu's emissary was killed and the money and any grain he had purchased presumably confiscated. In retaliation Zhu dispatched Zhu Zhen with an army who successfully plundered across Wei territory before returning home. Without support from Zhu, Le's son Le Congxun (樂從訓), who was a held out against the mutineers, was defeated, and he was executed along with his father, who had tried to avoid being executed by becoming a Buddhist monk; the Weibo officer Luo Hongxin took over Weibo and made peace with Zhu.

To the west two former followers of Zhuge Shuang, Zhang Quanyi, the mayor of Henan Municipality (河南, i.e., Luoyang) and Li Hanzhi the military governor of Heyang Circuit (河陽, headquartered at Meng Prefecture (孟州), in modern Jiaozuo, Henan), had been battling each other with Li Hanzhi eventually fleeing to Li Keyong, who dispatched an army to reinstate Li Hanzhi. Hard pressed Zhang turned to Zhu for aid. Zhu responded by sending an army under Ding Hui and Niu Cunjie (牛存節). They defeated Li Keyong's army and secured Heyang Circuit for Zhu Quanzhong. Thereafter, in Zhang, Zhu gained a loyal ally under whose administration Luoyang was to recover after years of ruinous warfare and whom he could thereafter rely upon for money and food supplies.

By June/July 888 the siege of Cai Prefecture had been ongoing for more than a hundred days. As general commander of the south-eastern front, Shi was formally in charge of the operation, Zhu Quanzhong submitted a petition to the court making accusations against Shi and demanding his removal from the post of general commander. Some time earlier Liu Zhan, the prefect of Chu Prefecture (楚州, in modern Huai'an, Jiangsu), had fled to Zhu Quanzhong due to the turmoil in Huainan. Intending to provoke Shi to take up arms Quanzhong now ordered Zhu Zhen to lead an army east and restore Liu to his prefecture – as to reach Chu Zhu Zhen would have to pass through Shi's Ganhua Circuit. As expected this was too much for Shi to bear and he ordered his armies to attack Zhu Zhen. Zhu Zhen was however victorious in a battle against Shi and proceeded to capture Su Prefecture (宿州, in modern Suzhou, Anhui) to the south. Zhu Quanzhong then ordered subordinate commander Pang Shigu to attack Ganhua's capital Xu Prefecture (徐州). In February/March 889 Pang defeated Shi in a battle at Lüliang.

Meanwhile, Cai Prefecture had finally been captured in January/February 889. Qin Zongquan was taken captive and, after passing through several hands, ended up in the care of Zhu Quanzhong who entrusted his own manager-adjutant Li Fan with the delivery of the prisoner to Chang'an, where the imperial government executed Qin. In April/May Zhu Quanzhong was elevated to Prince of Dongping.

During these firsts years as governor Zhu Quanzhong had put much trust in his chief commander, Zhu Zhen, so much that Zhen became powerful enough to challenge Quanzhong's authority. To put a check on this Zhu Quanzhong appointed one of his guard officers, Li Tangbin, in a move clearly modelled after the Tang practice of appointing eunuch supervisors to the armies. Zhu Zhen and Li Tangbin soon began to quarrel and in August 889, while the army was encamped at Xiao County for further campaigns against Shi Pu, Zhu Zhen found an excuse to have Li Tangbin killed. He then reported that he had executed Tangbin for sedition. This was a grave crisis for Zhu Quanzhong as it threatened to spark off a major mutiny in the army. After planning his response with his private secretary, Jing Xiang, Zhu Quanzhong first pretended to imprison Li Tangbin's family, seemingly upholding the sedition charge, and then leaving for the army's camps at Xiao County. On arrival Zhu Zhen came out to greet him only to be seized and killed by Quanzhong's bodyguards in front of the other commanders. Disaster averted, Zhu Quanzhong proceeded to reorganize his army to ensure a similar situation could not arise again. A new chief commander was appointed, but was not given the same powers. Zhu Quanzhong had previously created several special regiments under selected officers, and some of these would now accompany the chief commander to battle and share the field commands. Also a larger number officers than before were given commands of expeditionary armies. In this way no single commander would hold enough power to threaten Zhu Quanzhong again.

Meanwhile, to the south Yang Xingmi had been forced to abandon Yangzhou by Sun Ru, a former subordinate of Qin Zongquan. Having divided Zhu Zhen's army between Pang Shigu and Huo Cun, Zhu Quanzhong in spring 890 ordered Pang Shigu to cross the Huai River and attack Sun Ru, but Sun Ru was victorious.

April/May 890 the garrison of Suzhou mutinied and defected back to Shi Pu. Zhu Quanzhong personally led an attempt to retake the prefecture without success. It would take a one-and-a-half-year-long siege to recapture Suzhou.

To the north Li Keyong had recently suffered defeats from rival governors Helian Duo and Li Kuangwei. Together with Zhu Quanzhong these two now petitioned the court for a campaign against Li Keyong. At court, the chancellor Zhang Jun, said to have been secretly bribed by Zhu Quanzhong, supported the measure, but the majority of the bureaucracy were against. Zhang's fellow chancellor Kong Wei, however, supported Zhang's proposal, and Emperor Zhaozong, who had succeeded his brother Emperor Xizong in 888, also initially opposed military action, but in the end gave in to the pressure, assigning Zhang as commander of the campaign with the military governor Han Jian of Zhenguo Circuit (鎮國, headquartered in modern Weinan, Shaanxi) as his deputy.

At this time a mutiny had occurred at Lu Prefecture (潞州, in modern Changzhi, Shanxi), headquarters of the Zhaoyi Circuit (昭義). The military governor Li Kegong (李克恭), a brother of Li Keyong, was killed. The leader of the mutiny, Feng Ba (馮霸), now invited Zhu to take over the prefecture. Zhu sent an army under Ge Congzhou to occupy Lu and the court appointed the bureaucrat Sun Kui (孫揆) as the new Zhaoyi military governor. However, on his way to Lu, Sun was captured in an ambush by Li Keyong's adoptive son Li Cunxiao (and later executed when he would not submit to Li Keyong), and Ge was eventually forced to abandon Lu.

Rather than providing direct support for the imperial campaign against Li Keyong, Zhu at this time sought expand his own authority northwards. In December/January 890/891 Zhu Quanzhong gave up his claim to Huainan, an empty title given his failure to conquer that circuit, and instead received appointments as the military governor Xuanyi (i.e., Yicheng (headquartered at Hua Prefecture), with its name changed to observe naming taboo for Zhu's father Zhu Cheng). This meant that the current governor Hu Zhen, had to be removed since Zhu did not wish to keep him as acting governor, nor could he return to Zhu's service. Finally the court appointed Hu Grand General of the Metropolitan Guards and he had no more to do with Zhu Quanzhong. This episode is important as Zhu Quanzhong's first success in dealing with a subordinate governor. To serve as assistant governor at Hua while he himself remained at Bian, Zhu Quanzhong appointed his ex-secretary Xie Tong (謝瞳), one of his earliest followers from the Huang Chao days and a man with a proven administrative record.

Zhu Quanzhong next demanded from Weibo's military governor Luo Hongxin rights of passage, as well as provisions for his upcoming campaign against Li Keyong. Luo refused on the grounds that provisions were scarce and pointed out that Zhu Quanzhong's men should not have to pass through his province to the north to strike at Li Keyong to the west. With this refusal as excuse Zhu Quanzhong in March/April 891 marched against Weibo in person, with generals Ge and Ding in charge of subordinate commands, capturing four counties and routing the Weibo army in a battle at Neihuang. Following these defeats Luo was forced to sue for peace and accept an alliance with Zhu. Elsewhere Li Keyong had by this time soundly beaten Zhang in the field was now restored to his former titles by the Emperor.

In November/December 891 Su Prefecture finally fell to Zhu's armies after Ge and Ding flooded the city with water. This was followed the next month by the surrender of Cao Prefecture after the assassination of its prefect, Guo Ci (郭詞) by one of his own commanders, Guo Zhu (郭銖).

In March 892 Zhu led his army in an attack on Yun Prefecture, giving command of the vanguard to his first son Zhu Youyu. Zhu Youyu's career did not get a promising start with Zhu Quanzhong suffering two defeats due to Youyu's failure to link up with the main army. Despite these setbacks Zhu Quanzhong entrusted his son with an independent command and during the following winter Zhu Youyu captured Tianping's Pu Prefecture and then put Shi Pu under siege at Xu Prefecture. However, when inspector-in-chief (Zhu Quanzhong's adoptive son) Zhu Yougong (朱友恭) charged Zhu Youyu with incompetence after a battle with Zhu Jin, Zhu Quanzhong chose to reassign the army to Pang Shigu. In April/May 893 Pang Shigu captured Xu and Shi committed suicide, eliminating one of Zhu Quanzhong's rivals for dominance of the region. (Because of Zhu Yougong's accusations, Zhu Quanzhong nearly had Zhu Youyu executed, but after intercession by Zhu Quanzhong's wife Lady Zhang, Zhu Youyu was spared.)

To succeed Shi Pu as governor at Xuzhou Zhu Quanzhong chose one of his own personal associates, Zhang Tingfan. The only other prefecture of the province was given to general Ge Congzhou. Though Ge Congzhou was often absent on campaign it is unlikely that Zhang Tingfan could take advantage of this to expand his own power. By weakening the position of new governors in this way Zhu Quanzhong could control the various prefectures directly and ensure nobody built up an independent power base to rival his own.

=== Seizure of Tianping and Taining ===
With Shi Pu dead and Ganhua under his control, Zhu Quanzhong now concentrated on destroying Zhu Xuan and Zhu Jin. He attacked Zhu Xuan himself in 894, defeating Zhu Xuan and Zhu Jin's joint forces and killing more than 10,000 men from Tianping and Taining. (Around the same time, Li Keyong's strength was said to be beginning to wane after a costly campaign to defeat his adoptive son Li Cunxiao, who had rebelled against him, while the relationship between Zhu Quanzhong and Yang Xingmi was beginning to become tense again, after Zhu Quanzhong's vassal Zhang Jian (張諫) turned against Zhu Quanzhong and surrendered Si Prefecture (泗州, in modern Huai'an) to Yang, and Zhu, apparently in retaliation, seized a large shipment of tea that Yang had delivered to Bian Prefecture, intending to sell.)

Zhu Quanzhong thereafter dealt blow after blow against Zhu Xuan and Zhu Jin, despite reinforcements that Li Keyong was sending them from Hedong. In late 896, he had Ge Congzhou put Taining's capital Yan Prefecture (兗州) under siege, while himself followed to reinforced Ge. When Zhu Xuan sent Tianping and Hedong forces to try to lift the siege, Zhu Quanzhong defeated them, displaying the Tianping and Hedong officers he captured to Zhu Jin, trying to get him to surrender. However, the siege lost its force when Zhu Jin pretended to surrender, but instead used the opportunity to capture a cousin who had surrendered previously (Zhu Qiong (朱瓊) the prefect of Qi Prefecture (齊州, in modern Jinan, Shandong)) and execute Zhu Qiong. Zhu Quanzhong, with the morale lost, withdrew from Yan. However, he left Ge in the vicinity to continue to watch and wear Zhu Jin down.

In late 895 and early 896, Li Keyong tried to send Zhu Xuan and Zhu Jin two major waves of reinforcements, first commanded by the officers Shi Yan (史儼) and Li Chengsi (李承嗣), and the second commanded by his adoptive son Li Cunxin. Both waves of reinforcements had to go through Weibo, and while the first wave went through, Li Cunxin angered Weibo's military governor Luo Hongxin by pillaging the people of Weibo; further, Zhu Quanzhong wrote Luo and warned Luo that he believed that Li Keyong intended to conquer all of the territory north of the Yellow River, including Weibo. Luo thus ambushed Li Cunxin, inflicting heavy losses and preventing Li Cunxin's forces from reaching Tianping, and Luo thereafter became a Xuanwu ally, particularly after Li Keyong's subsequent punitive attack against Weibo was repelled by joint Weibo/Xuanwu forces.

By early 896, Pang Shigu's forces had reached Tianping's capital Yun Prefecture. In spring 897, a joint siege by Pang and Ge captured Yun; Zhu Xuan and his wife were captured in flight; Zhu Xuan was subsequently executed. Zhu Jin abandoned Yan and fled to Huainan with Shi and Li Chengsi, leaving Zhu in control of all of the lands directly east of his own Xuanwu Circuit, all the way to the East China Sea (as Wang Shifan's Pinglu Circuit had become a vassal by this point). However, with the Tianping/Taining/Hedong remnants now part of the Huainan army, the Huainan army's land capabilities were much enhanced in the latter battles against Zhu Quanzhong (whereas it was previously only capable in water combat). Zhu Quanzhong initially took Zhu Jin's wife, who was captured by the Xuanwu army, as a concubine, but at the suggestion of Lady Zhang (who used reversed psychology to show Zhu Quanzhong that this was improper humiliation of Zhu Jin's wife), he allowed Zhu Jin's wife to become a Buddhist nun. He made Ge the acting military governor of Taining, Zhu Youyu the acting military governor of Tianping, and Pang the acting military governor of Wuning (i.e., Ganhua, changing its name back to its earlier name).

=== Continued expansion ===
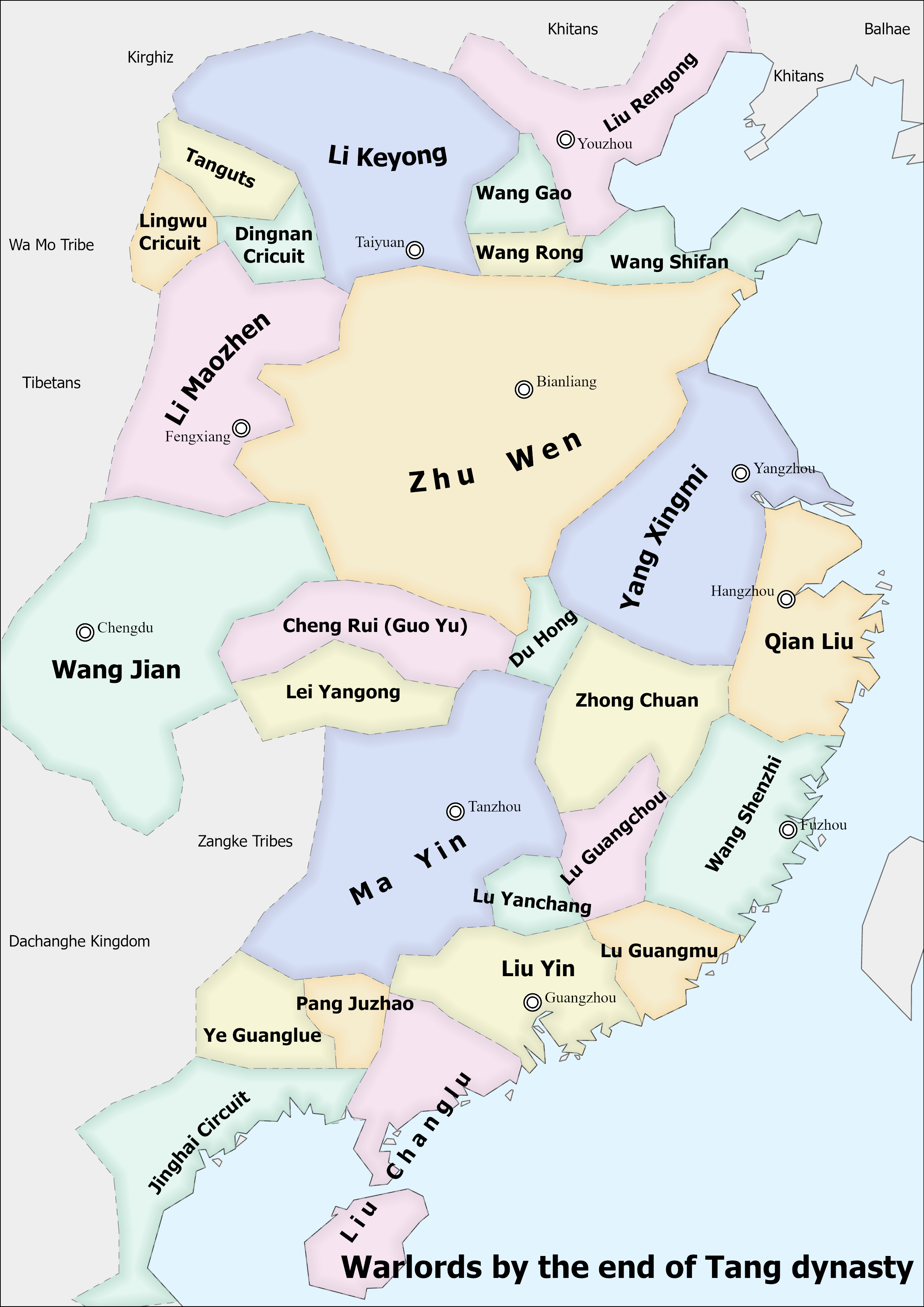
The situation of 902, when Zhu Wen controlled the central plain and Li Maozhen dominated the northwest

By this point, Zhu Quanzhong was also allied with the chancellor Cui Yin, such that when Emperor Zhaozong (who was then at Hua Prefecture (華州; not the same prefecture as the one in Xuanyi Circuit), the capital of Han Jian's Zhenguo Circuit, after Li Maozhen the military governor of Fengxiang Circuit (鳳翔, headquartered in modern Baoji, Shaanxi) attacked Chang'an) considered sending Cui out of the imperial government, Cui used Zhu's influence to force Han and Emperor Zhaozong to change their minds and retain Cui at the imperial court.

Meanwhile, the cousins Wang Ke the military governor of Huguo Circuit (護國, headquartered in modern Yuncheng, Shanxi), an adoptive son of Wang Chongrong's and biological nephew, as Wang Ke's biological father was Wang Chongrong's older brother Wang Chongjian (王重簡), and Wang Gong the military governor of Baoyi Circuit (保義, headquartered in modern Sanmenxia, Henan), a son of Wang Chongrong's brother Wang Chongying, who had succeeded Wang Chongrong and served until his death in 895, had been contending for the control of Huguo. Li Keyong supported Wang Ke, while Zhu supported Wang Gong. In spring 897, Zhu sent Zhang Cunjing (張存敬) and Yang Shihou to put Huguo under siege, but Li Keyong sent his nephew Li Sizhao to defeat Wang Gong's forces and forcing the Xuanwu forces to lift the siege.

In fall 897, Zhu Quanzhong decided to launch a major attack on Yang Xingmi, intending to capture Huainan, after Yang attacked Zhu's ally Du Hong the military governor of Wuchang Circuit (武昌, headquartered in modern Wuhan, Hubei), with Pang Shigu in command of the forward forces and Zhu himself commanding the main Xuanwu forces. He gathered his available forces and sent Pang with 70,000 soldiers from Xuanwu and Wuning Circuits to Qingkou (清口, in modern Huai'an, Jiangsu), posturing to head to Huainan's capital Yang Prefecture (揚州); Ge Congzhou with the forces from Tianping and Taining Circuits to Anfeng (安豐, in modern Lu'an, Anhui), posturing to head to Shou Prefecture (壽州, in modern Lu'an); and Zhu Quanzhong himself with his main forces to Su Prefecture (宿州, in modern Suzhou). The people of Huainan Circuit were greatly shocked and dismayed by Zhu's forces. However, Pang, because he had such an impressive force, underestimated Yang Xingmi's army. Yang Xingmi had Zhu Jin serve as his advance commander, and Zhu constructed a dam on the Huai River. When Yang Xingmi attacked Pang, Zhu released the waters to flood Pang's army, and then attacked Pang with Yang. Pang's army was crushed by the waters and the Huainan forces, and Pang was killed. Zhu Yanshou also defeated Ge's army. Hearing that both of his generals had been defeated, Zhu Quanzhong also retreated. The Battle of Qingkou thus affirmed Yang's control of the territory between the Huai and the Yangtze Rivers. Meanwhile, in spring 898, at Zhu Quanzhong's insistence, Emperor Zhaozong confirmed him as the military governor of Xuanwu, Xuanyi, and Tianping. He then, in conjunction with Weibo forces, attacked three prefectures of Zhaoyi Circuit east of the Taihang Mountains that Li Keyong controlled; the three prefectures soon fell, and Zhu put Ge in charge of the prefectures as the acting military governor of Zhaoyi.

At the same time, after Zhu's defeat at Qingkou, Zhao Deyin's son and successor as military governor of Zhongyi, Zhao Kuangning, had become allied with Yang. Zhu sent Shi Shucong (氏叔琮) and Kang Huaizhen (康懷貞) to attack Zhongyi. In fear, Zhao resubmitted to Zhu as a vassal. Meanwhile, Emperor Zhaozong tried to mediate a peace between Zhu and Li Keyong. Li Keyong was receptive, but Zhu's refusal ended hopes of peace.

Zhu then discovered that another vassal, Cui Hong (崔洪) the military governor of Fengguo, was communicating with Yang. He sent Zhang Cunjing to attack Cui. Cui, in fear, sent his brother Cui Xian (崔賢) as a hostage to Zhu and offered to send troops to supplement Xuanwu forces. Zhu initially agreed and recalled Zhang. When Zhu then sent Cui Xian back to Fengguo to express Zhu's order that Fengguo forces be sent to supplement Xuanwu forces, the Fengguo forces mutinied, killed Cui Xian, and forced Cui Hong to flee to Huainan.

In spring 899, Zhu's forces were engaging rivals on three fronts—with Li Hanzhi recently having seized the western half of Zhaoyi after the death of Li Keyong's general Xue Jiqin (薛志勤), who had been in command of Zhaoyi, Zhu sent forces to aid him; with Liu Rengong, who had taken control of both Lulong Circuit (盧龍, headquartered in modern Beijing) and Yichang Circuit (義昌, headquartered in modern Cangzhou, Hebei), attacking Weibo, Zhu sent forces to aid Weibo's military governor Luo Shaowei (Luo Hongxin's son and successor); and with Yang and Zhu Jin attacking Wuning. Yang's attack appeared to have soon dissipated, however, while Zhu's forces were successful on both the Zhaoyi and Weibo fronts, crushing Liu's forces and forcing him to stop his attack on Weibo, and stopping Li Keyong's attack on the Zhaoyi front and retaining the control of Zhaoyi.

By 900, by which time Emperor Zhaozong had returned to Chang'an, and Cui Yin had lost his chancellor title due to pressure from the imperial eunuchs, whom Cui had been secretly planning with Emperor Zhaozong to slaughter, Cui again used Zhu's influence to return to the chancellorship and to force the deaths of fellow chancellor Wang Tuan (who had opposed Cui's plan of slaughtering the eunuchs) and the eunuchs Zhu Daobi (朱道弼) and Jing Wuxiu (景務脩).

Also in 900, Zhu Quanzhong made a major incursion to the north, inflicting heavy losses against Liu Rengong, and also forcing the submission of two circuits which had been loosely allied with Li Keyong (Chengde (成德, headquartered in modern Shijiazhuang, Hebei), ruled by Wang Rong, and Yiwu (義武, headquartered in modern Baoding, Hebei), ruled at the time by Wang Gao, who fled in face of the Xuanwu attack and was replaced by his uncle Wang Chuzhi. It was said that by this point, all of the circuits north of the Yellow River were submissive to Zhu.

In late 901, the eunuchs headed by Liu Jishu and Wang Zhongxian (王仲先), still fearing that Emperor Zhaozong and Cui were planning to slaughter them, carried out a coup against Emperor Zhaozong, forcing him to pass the throne to his crown prince Li Yu and putting him under house arrest. The eunuchs also wanted to kill Cui, but feared that if they did so, they would face Zhu's wrath, and so only had Cui removed from his secondary post as the director of the salt and iron monopolies. Meanwhile, Cui was secretly exchanging letters with Zhu, planning to counteract against the eunuchs, and Zhu also sent his key advisor Li Zhen to Chang'an to discuss the matter with Cui. Before Zhu actually could act against the eunuchs, though, several officers of the eunuch-commanded Shence Armies, whom Cui had persuaded to turn against the eunuchs, led a mutiny against Liu and Wang in early 902, killing them and their allies and restoring Emperor Zhaozong to the throne. Apparently to reward Zhu's support of Cui in the countercoup, Emperor Zhaozong created Zhu the Prince of Dongping.

Despite this, however, Emperor Zhaozong did not turn control of the Shence Armies to Cui and his fellow chancellor Lu Yi, as Cui and Lu suggested, but gave the command of the Shence Armies to the eunuchs Han Quanhui and Zhang Yanhong (張彥弘). Cui, fearing the implications of this development, persuaded Li Maozhen, who had had a rapprochement with Emperor Zhaozong by this point, to leave a Fengxiang contingent at Chang'an to counteract against the Shence Armies, but the Fengxiang contingent soon became allied with the eunuchs as well.

While this was going on, in spring 902, Zhu launched a surprise attack on Huguo, and as part of the campaign quickly took control of the only viable path between Hedong and Huguo, so that Li Keyong could not come to Wang Ke's aid. Without Li Keyong's aid, Wang Ke was quickly forced to surrender, allowing Zhu to take control of Huguo. Despite a subsequent peace overture from Li Keyong, Zhu decided to attack Hedong to see if he could wipe out his long-term rival in one campaign. He put Hedong's capital Taiyuan under siege, but with inclement weather hindering the siege, he was soon forced to give up the siege on Taiyuan. Soon thereafter, Emperor Zhaozong confirmed him as the military governor of four circuits—Xuanwu, Xuanyi, Tianping, and Huguo.

Meanwhile, at Chang'an, the eunuchs, having established a firm alliance with Li Maozhen, were preparing to act against Cui. Cui, in fear, wrote to Zhu, claiming that the eunuchs were planning to attack Zhu in alliance with Li Maozhen. Zhu thereafter prepared to launch an army to march on Chang'an. When the eunuchs received this news, they seized Emperor Zhaozong and his family, and fled to Fengxiang with them.

=== Campaign against Fengxiang ===
Zhu Quanzhong subsequently reached Chang'an and rendezvoused with Cui Yin, and then proceeded to Fengxiang, where Li Maozhen and Han Quanhui had Emperor Zhaozong issue orders that he return to Xuanwu. After initial preliminary engagements there, Zhu turned around and focused his attention on first conquering Li Maozhen's other possessions in the Guanzhong region (i.e., the region around Chang'an) first, including, among others, Jingnan Circuit (靜難, headquartered in modern Xianyang, Shaanxi), governed by Li Maozhen's adoptive son Li Jihui; he quickly forced the surrender of Li Jihui and other subordinates of Li Maozhen, isolating Fengxiang.

Han sent eunuch messengers to the circuits in the southeast, ordering them to attack Zhu's territory from behind, but most or all of them were intercepted and killed by Zhu's ally Feng Xingxi the military governor of Rongzhao Circuit (戎昭, headquartered in modern Ankang, Shaanxi). Li Maozhen also sought aid from Wang Jian the military governor of Xichuan Circuit (西川, headquartered in modern Chengdu, Sichuan), a major warlord to Li Maozhen's southwest, but while Wang outwardly supported Li Maozhen and rebuked Zhu, he was in secret contact with Zhu and instead used this opportunity to seize Li Maozhen's possessions south of the Qinling Mountains one by one. Li Keyong tried to aid Li Maozhen by sending his nephew Li Sizhao and officer Zhou Dewei to attack parts of Huguo, but a subsequent counterattack by Zhu's nephew Zhu Youning (朱友寧) and officer Shi Shucong (氏叔琮) beat back the Hedong forces and, for some time, actually put Taiyuan under siege again; while the Hedong forces subsequently repelled the Xuanwu forces, for several years thereafter, Li Keyong did not dare to again challenge Zhu Quanzhong's supremacy in the region.

By summer 902, Zhu and his main army had returned to Fengxiang and put it under siege. Li Maozhen made several attempts to counterattack, but each of Li Maozhen's attempts was beaten back by the besieging Xuanwu army. (Meanwhile, Emperor Zhaozong had sent the imperial envoy Li Yan to Huainan to order Yang Xingmi to attack Zhu's territory, but Yang, after launching a campaign but having his food supply delivery hampered by an inadequate supply system, withdrew.) By fall 902, Fengxiang was in a desperate state, but so was Zhu—as his siege was hampered by the rainy weather and the soldiers were becoming ill. At the suggestion of his officer Gao Jichang, he laid a trap for Li Maozhen by having a soldier, Ma Jing (馬景), falsely surrender to Li Maozhen and claim that Zhu's army was so stricken by illnesses that it was withdrawing that night. A major attack by Li Maozhen's army from within the city fell into traps that the Xuanwu army laid, and the Fengxiang army suffered huge losses, such that from that point on, Li Maozhen began considering a negotiated peace with Zhu.

The parties soon began negotiating in earnest, and Zhu sent supplies inside the city for Emperor Zhaozong, with the intent of causing Li Maozhen and Emperor Zhaozong to be suspicious of each other. As of new year 903, Zhu had captured Li Maozhen's possessions one by one, while Li Maozhen's possessions south of the Qinling had fallen into Wang Jian's hands. Li Maozhen, thereafter, started direct negotiations with Zhu and considered slaughtering the eunuchs to preserve himself.

During the siege, however, the eunuchs had been sending messengers to the various circuits, delivering edicts in Emperor Zhaozong's name ordering them to attack Zhu. In response, in spring 903, Pinglu's military governor Wang Shifan launched an ambitious uprising, intending to have his officers, whom he had sent in disguises of merchants, to various cities held by Zhu, organize simultaneous popular uprisings against Zhu. However, nearly all of the officers Wang sent out were discovered and arrested in the cities they were sent, with the exception of Liu Xun, who was able to surprise Zhu's garrison at Taining (as Taining's military governor Ge Congzhou was stationed at Xing Prefecture (邢州, in modern Xingtai, Hebei) at that time, apparently defending against a potential Li Keyong attack) and seize Taining's capital Yan Prefecture. Zhu had to react by sending Zhu Youning and Ge to the east, to face Wang.

Shortly after the start of Wang's uprising, Zhu and Li Maozhen reached a peace agreement, with Li Maozhen slaughtering the eunuchs and delivering the emperor and the imperial household to Zhu for Zhu to return with them to Chang'an. Zhu personally escorted the emperor's train back to the capital. Subsequently, after a joint petition by Zhu and Cui Yin, all palace eunuchs—including the ones who had not participated in Han Quanhui and Zhang Yanhong's plot to force the emperor to Fengxiang and who had remained at Chang'an—were slaughtered, and the imperial guards were put under Cui's command.

=== Moving the imperial court to Luoyang ===
After Emperor Zhaozong returned to Chang'an, he heaped honors and titles on Zhu Quanzhong, including the titles of Deputy Generalissimo of all Circuits (諸道兵馬副元帥, with Emperor Zhaozong's son Li Zuo (李祚) the Prince of Hui serving titularly as Generalissimo) and Prince of Liang. Meanwhile, Zhu's ally Cui Yin was (in Cui's own estimation) in control of the capital and dominated the imperial court. Zhu shortly after departed Chang'an and headed back to Xuanwu, to deal with Wang's uprising, while leaving his nephew Zhu Youlun (朱友倫) at Chang'an with 20,000 Xuanwu soldiers, to continue to defend/control the emperor.

Once Zhu returned to Xuanwu, he gathered his army to get ready to capture the two Wang Shifan-held circuits, Pinglu and Taining. However, in summer 903, Wang, in alliance with Yang Xingmi's general Wang Maozhang, crushed and killed Zhu Youning in battle, giving Wang Shifan's badly outnumbered army a brief reprieve. Wang Maozhang, however, then judged the situation to be hopeless and withdrew his Huainan army, leaving Wang Shifan to face Zhu alone. Further, shortly after, Yang would be battling a rebellion against him by his generals Tian Jun the military governor of Ningguo Circuit (寧國, headquartered in modern Xuancheng, Anhui) and An Renyi (安仁義) the military prefect of Run Prefecture (潤州, in modern Zhenjiang, Jiangsu) and be unable to again aid Wang Shifan. Wang Shifan was forced to surrender to Zhu, and, while Zhu allowed him to remain military governor of Pinglu for the time being, would not again pose a threat to Zhu.

Meanwhile, Cui had begun to see the army that Zhu left at Chang'an to be a threat to the security of the imperial government and of himself, and therefore had been trying to recruit a new army to replace the decimated imperial guards and Shence Armies. Zhu realized this and began to suspect Cui of getting ready to turn against him. Further, Zhu Youlun died in a polo accident in winter 903—an accident that Zhu Quanzhong did not consider an accident at all but suspected Cui's involvement in. He sent another nephew, Zhu Youliang (朱友諒), to Chang'an to take over Zhu Youlun's post, and he also sent his soldiers to pretend to be recruits to infiltrate the new army that Cui was building.

With Li Maozhen's army also being rebuilt and with Li Jihui having reverted his allegiance to Li Maozhen (after he was outraged that Zhu had raped his wife during the Fengxiang campaign), Zhu became concerned about his control of the emperor being challenged not only by Cui, but by renewed military efforts of Li Maozhen and Li Jihui. He therefore resolved to forcibly move the emperor to Luoyang, closer to his base at Bian. In spring 904, he submitted a petition to Emperor Zhaozong, accusing Cui of treason, and then had the Xuanwu army at Chang'an surround Cui's mansion and kill him. Zhu thereafter had Emperor Zhaozong, the imperial household, and the populace of Chang'an forcibly escorted to Luoyang. After Emperor Zhaozong reached Luoyang, all the imperial guards were Zhu's elite soldiers, and the emperor became isolated.

=== The killing of Emperor Zhaozong and the seizure of the throne ===
As a result of the forced movement of the emperor, the several remaining warlords who were not compliant to Zhu Quanzhong (Li Maozhen, Li Jihui, Li Keyong, Liu Rengong, Wang Jian, and Yang Xingmi, Zhao Kuangning, and Zhao Kuangning's brother Zhao Kuangming the military governor of Jingnan Circuit (荊南, headquartered in modern Jingzhou, Hubei, not the same circuit as Li Jihui's)) all issued declarations calling for the people to rise against Zhu and restore imperial power. Zhu became apprehensive that while Emperor Zhaozong was under heavy guard, he would nevertheless try to act against Zhu's interests if Zhu left on a campaign, particularly when Zhu could not get Emperor Zhaozong to agree to execute Li Yu (under the reasoning that Li Yu, albeit a child at the time, had wrongly occupied the throne during the eunuchs' coup against Emperor Zhaozong). He came to the belief that he should remove the adult emperor and replace the emperor with a more-easily controlled child. In fall 904, he had Zhu Yougong and Shi Shucong lead soldiers into the Luoyang palace and kill Emperor Zhaozong, and then blamed the incident on Zhu Yougong and Shi, forcing them to commit suicide. He had Li Zuo declared emperor (as Emperor Ai).

Shortly after Emperor Zhaozong's death, Zhu also had nine elder of the deceased emperor's sons (except Emperor Ai) killed, sparing Emperor Ai and his mother (Emperor Zhaozong's wife) Empress Dowager He. Further, under the advice of his ally, the chancellor Liu Can, and Li Zhen, he carried out a slaughter of senior Tang officials from aristocratic family, including forcing some 30 of them to commit suicide at Baima (白馬, in modern Anyang) and then throwing their bodies into the Yellow River.

In 904, Zhu's wife Lady Zhang died. She was said to be a moderating influence and a wise advisor to Zhu, and it was said that after her death, his violent and licentious tendencies became out of control.

In fall 905, Zhu carried out against the Zhao brothers, quickly defeating them and forcing them to flee (Zhao Kuangning to Yang, Zhao Kuangming to Wang Jian), allowing him to absorb the Zhaos' territory. He was originally planning to returning to his own territory after this, but then changed his mind and decided to attack Yang. His army, however, was hampered by the storms and unable to inflict any real damage on Yang's territory before being forced to withdraw.

Zhu had by this point decided to take over the Tang throne. Liu, as well as the director of palace communications Jiang Xuanhui (蔣玄暉), were thus planning the traditional steps for the regime transition—which would include having Zhu created the prince of a large fief, given the Nine Bestowments, and given other extraordinary honors, before the emperor would yield the throne to him. So, as the first step, they had Emperor Ai first make Zhu the Generalissimo of All Circuits. The impatient Zhu was displeased, wanting the process to go faster; meanwhile, Jiang's political enemies Wang Yin (王殷) and Zhao Yinheng used the chance to falsely accuse Liu and Jiang of dithering not only to allow Tang to survive longer, but to wait for the possibility of change in situation; they further accused Jiang to be in an affair with Empress Dowager He. Zhu thus became incensed at Liu and Jiang, and not even a subsequent edict in Emperor Ai's name creating him the Prince of Wei (with a 21-circuit fief) and giving him the Nine Bestowments placated him. Late in 905, he had Liu, Jiang, and Empress Dowager He executed, and forced Emperor Ai to issue an edict claiming that Empress Dowager He committed suicide to offer an apology for her affairs with Jiang and posthumously demoting her to commoner status.

In spring 906, Luo Shaowei, fearful of his own headquarters guards (who had become extremely powerful and often overthrew military governors to install new ones of their liking), entered a pact with Zhu where he slaughtered the headquarters guards and Zhu provided Xuanwu military support in order to suppress possible mutinies in response. When Luo subsequently carried out the slaughter, many Weibo soldiers mutinied in response, and for several months Zhu and Luo's joint forces suppressed the mutinies. After that campaign, Zhu headed north, wanting to conquer Liu Rengong's lands. He put Liu's son Liu Shouwen (whom Liu Rengong had made the military governor of Yichang) under siege at Yichang's capital Cang Prefecture (滄州). However, at this time, Ding Hui, whom Zhu had made the military governor of Zhaoyi, aggravated at Zhu's killing of Emperor Zhaozong, rebelled against Zhu and surrendered his territory to Li Keyong. Zhu was forced to give up his campaign against Liu and withdraw.

On the back to Xuanwu, Zhu stopped at Weibo to rest his body due to an illness. While there, Luo pointed out to him that the warlords still resisting him were all claiming that they were intending to restore the Tang emperor's power, and suggested to him that he should quickly take the throne to end such hopes. While Zhu did not respond to Luo's suggestion, he was personally thankful to Luo for bringing the suggestion. Once he returned to Xuanwu, he again did not respond when the Tang official Xue Yiju, then visiting Xuanwu ostensibly by Emperor Ai's order, suggested the idea, showing, indeed, that he was intending to do so. When Xue returned to Luoyang, he mentioned this to Emperor Ai, who thereafter issued an edict to prepare to yield the throne in spring 907. Thereafter, Zhu changed his name to Zhu Huang, and then, when Emperor Ai sent the chancellors Zhang Wenwei and Yang She to Daliang to offer the throne to him, accepted, thus ending Tang and starting a new Later Liang (with him as its Emperor Taizu)—despite the misgivings of his brother Zhu Quanyu (朱全昱) and Zhu Quanyu's subsequent prediction that this would bring disaster on the Zhu clan.

== Reign as Later Liang emperor ==
The new Later Liang emperor created the deposed Tang emperor the Prince of Jiyin, and moved him to Cao Prefecture, under secure guard. (He would, however, have the Prince of Jiyin poisoned in 908.) He posthumously honored his parents, as well as ancestors up to four generations, as emperors and empresses. He made Jing Xiang his chief advisor, making decisions in conjunction with Jing before having Jing announce them to the chancellors.

Most circuits around the former Tang realm reacted to the transition by submitting to the new emperor's authority. The only exceptions were regions controlled by Li Keyong (thereafter becoming known as Jin), Li Maozhen (thereafter becoming known as Qi), Yang Xingmi's son and successor Yang Wo (thereafter becoming known as Wu), and Wang Jian (thereafter becoming known as Former Shu). Li Keyong, Li Maozhen, and Yang continued to observe the Tang era name of Tianyou, thus acting as if they were still part of the defunct Tang state, while Wang shortly after declared himself the emperor of a new Former Shu state. Liu Rengong initially did not react; however, shortly after, he was put under house arrest by his son Liu Shouguang, who took over Lulong; both Liu Shouwen, who thereafter launched a campaign to try to free his father against his brother Liu Shouguang, and Liu Shouguang nominally submitted to Later Liang.

Shortly after becoming emperor, apparently intending to deal a crippling blow to Jin, Emperor Taizu sent Kang Huaizhen north to put Lu Prefecture, then under the command of Li Sizhao, under tight siege; he later went to Lu himself to reinforce the siege. Li Keyong initially sent Zhou Dewei to try to lift the siege, but was unable to do so. In spring 908, Li Keyong himself fell deathly ill, forcing Zhou to withdraw back to Taiyuan. Li Keyong died shortly after and was succeeded by his son Li Cunxu. Emperor Taizu, believing that Lu would fall easily in the aftermaths, not only withdrew himself but also withdrew part of the siege army, under the command of Liu Zhijun, to guard against a potential Qi attack. Li Cunxu, realizing that the Later Liang army had been weakened, launched a surprise assault on the Later Liang army sieging Lu, crushing it and lifting the siege, thus stabilizing the security of the Jin state. When Emperor Taizu received news of the death, he lamented:

If one were to have a son, the son should be like Li Yazi [("Yazi" being Li Cunxu's nickname)]. It is like Li Keyong had not died. As for my own sons, they are just like a group of pigs and dogs.

In 909, Emperor Taizu moved the capital from Daliang to Luoyang, leaving his adoptive son Zhu Youwen the Prince of Bo in charge at Daliang.

Also in 909, Liu Zhijun, then defending Hua Prefecture (the one in Zhenguo Circuit), became apprehensive when Emperor Taizu, in response to false accusations that the general Liu Han (劉捍) made against Wang Chongshi (王重師) the military governor of Youguo Circuit (佑國, then headquartered at Chang'an), slaughtered Wang and his family. Liu Zhijun made a surprise uprising against Later Liang, surrendering not only his own Zhongwu Circuit to Qi but also capturing Chang'an and presenting it to Qi. Emperor Taizu was quickly able to dispatch Yang Shihou and Liu Xun to recapture Chang'an and force Liu Zhijun to flee to Fengxiang, however, without significant losses on the western border.

Late in 909, Liu Shouguang captured Liu Shouwen at the Battle of Jisu, and subsequently proceeded to Yichang and conquered it. He continued to be nominally submissive to Emperor Taizu, and Emperor Taizu made him the military governor of both Lulong and Yichang.

Also nominally submissive to Emperor Taizu, in the north, were Wang Rong's Chengde Circuit (now renamed to Wushun to observe naming taboo for Emperor Taizu's father Zhu Cheng) and Wang Chuzhi's Yiwu Circuit, which, while as they did during Tang times, continued to refuse to submit taxes to the Later Liang imperial government, were often offering tributes to the emperor. In addition, Wang Rong's son Wang Zhaozuo married Emperor Taizu's daughter Princess Puning. However, Emperor Taizu suspected them of eventually turning against him, and therefore decided to seize them by trick. He sent the officers Du Tingyin (杜廷隱) and Ding Yanhui (丁延徽) north with 3,000 men to Wushun's Shen (深州) and Ji (冀州) (both in modern Hengshui, Hebei), claiming to be helping Wushun to defend potential Liu Shouguang incursions. Wang Rong, not wanting to appear disobedient, agreed to let Du and Ding enter those prefectural capitals. Upon entering, however, Du and Ding slaughtered the Wushun garrisons in those cities and held the cities, waiting for a coming Later Liang main army attack, commanded by Wang Jingren. Wang Rong and Wang Chuzhi (who believed that this action also aimed against him) sought emergency aid from both Li Cunxu and Liu Shouguang. Liu refused, but Li quickly dispatched Zhou, and then followed himself. In spring 911, the joint Jin/Wushun/Yiwu forces crushed the Later Liang forces under Wang Jingren at Boxiang (柏鄉, in modern Xingtai), securing Wushun (which then changed its name back to Chengde, and was also thereafter known as Zhao) and Yiwu. The Jin forces advanced as far south as Tianxiong (i.e., Weibo), before withdrawing due to fears that Liu Shouguang might decide to attack from the rear. From this point on, Chengde and Yiwu became firm Jin allies and again resumed the use of Tang era names.

After the Later Liang defeats at Lu Prefecture against Jin and at Boxiang against the joint Jin/Zhao/Yiwu armies, Emperor Taizu wanted opportunities to avenge himself against these enemies, and was irritable and even more violent to his own subordinates after, for some time in 911, he was unable to entice the Jin/Zhao forces into a confrontation. Further, his illnesses were recurring, further causing him to be more irritable. He thought he got the chance in 912 when Jin, with assistance from Zhao and Yiwu, launched an attack on Liu Shouguang (who had declared himself the emperor of a new state of Yan), seeking to destroy Yan. Emperor Taizu decided to try to save Liu by attacking north with a massive army. However, after the forward scouts were defeated and captured by the Jin general Li Cunshen (Li Cunxu's adoptive brother), Li Cunshen and fellow Jin officers Shi Jiantang (史建瑭) and Li Sigong (李嗣肱) misled Emperor Taizu into believing that the defeat was one of a greater scale and that a massive Jin army was approaching. The Later Liang emperor fled in a panic with heavy losses. After the defeat, he became even more seriously ill, and he returned to Luoyang.

Meanwhile, it was said that in his latter years, after Lady Zhang's death, Emperor Taizu became increasingly licentious. (One example would be in 911, when he was spending the summer at the summer mansion belonging to Zhang Quanyi (who had changed his name to Zhang Zongshi after Emperor Taizu took the throne, to observe naming taboo). While at Zhang's mansion, it was said that Emperor Taizu had sexual relations with nearly all of the women of the Zhang household, causing an insulted son of Zhang Zongshi's, Zhang Jizuo (張繼祚), to consider assassinating him, only to be stopped by Zhang Zongshi, who cited Emperor Taizu's previously saving their house when they were under Li Hanzhi's attack.) It was said that with Emperor Taizu's sons often away from the capital on missions, he would summon their wives into the palace to attend to him, and often had sexual relations with them. He particularly favored Zhu Youwen's wife Lady Wang. Further, although Zhu Youwen was not a biological son, he was the oldest among his surviving sons (as his only older biological son, Zhu Youyu, had died earlier), and he was seriously contemplating passing the throne to Zhu Youwen. In summer 912, when he became deathly ill, he sent Lady Wang to Daliang to summon Zhu Youwen. At the same time, he issued an edict, through Jing, sending his next oldest son, Zhu Yougui the Prince of Ying, out of the capital Luoyang to serve as the prefect of Lai Prefecture and decreeing that he report there immediately. This made Zhu Yougui, whom the emperor did not favor, believe that the next order would be to kill him—for, around that time, it was customary to first exile an official before executing him. Zhu Yougui immediately formed a conspiracy with the imperial guard general Han Qing (韓勍), and thereafter took imperial guard soldiers into the palace. He assassinated Emperor Taizu with the assistance of his servant Feng Ting'e (馮廷諤), and then issued order in Emperor Taizu's name to his brother Zhu Youzhen the Prince of Jun, who was also at Daliang, to execute Zhu Youwen. After doing so, Zhu Yougui publicly announced Emperor Taizu's death and blamed the death on Zhu Youwen, then took the throne. Zhu Youzhen would in turn overthrow him next year and take the throne.

== Personal information ==
Parents

- Father: Zhu Cheng (朱誠), posthumously honored Emperor Wenmu (文穆皇帝) with the temple name of Liezu (烈祖) (honored 907)
- Mother: Lady Wang (died 891), Lady Dowager of Jin, posthumously honored Empress Wenhui (文惠皇后)

Consort and issue

- Empress Yuanzhen (元貞皇后) (honored 912) of the Zhang clan (张氏 )
  - Zhu Youzhen (朱友貞) (888–923), the Prince of Jun (created 907), later emperor
  - Zhu Youzi (朱友孜), the Prince of Kang (created 913?, executed by Zhu Youzhen 915)
- Consort Shi, Lady of Wuwei, of the Shi clan (石氏), younger sister of Shi Yanci (石彥辭) Baron of Wuwei
- Zhaoyi Chen, of the Chen clan (陳昭儀 陳氏), later Buddhist nun (tonsure 909)
- Zhaorong Li, of the Li clan (李昭容 李氏)
- Meiren, of the Duan clan (段美人), younger sister of Duan Ning
- Wife of Zhu Jin
- Unknown:
  - Zhu Youyu (朱友裕) (died 904), posthumously created Prince of Chen (created 907)
  - Zhu Yougui (朱友珪), the Prince of Ying (created 907), later emperor
  - Zhu Youzhang (朱友璋), the Prince of Fu (created 907)
  - Zhu Youyong (朱友雍), the Prince of He (created 907)
  - Zhu Youhui (朱友徽), the Prince of Jian (created 907)
  - Princess Anyang, wife of Luo Tinggui (羅廷規), son of Luo Shaowei
  - Princess Changle, wife of Zhao Yan, son of Zhao Chou
  - Princess Jinhua, second wife of Luo Tinggui, later Buddhist nun (tonsure 910)
  - Princess Puning, wife of Wang Zhaozuo, son of Wang Rong
  - Princess Zhenning
- Adopted Children
  - Zhu Youwen (朱友文), né Kang Qin (康勤), the Prince of Bo (murdered by Zhu Youzhen on Zhu Yougui's orders 912)
  - Zhu Youqian, né Zhu Jian (朱簡), the Prince of Ji
  - Zhu Yougong (朱友恭), né Li Yanwei (李彥威) (executed and original name restored 904)
  - Zhu Yourang (朱友讓), né Li Rang (李讓)
  - Zhu Hanbin (朱漢賓), son of Zhu Yuanli (朱元禮) an officer killed in battle

Zhu Wen Later Liang Born: 852 Died: 912
Regnal titles
Preceded by None (dynasty started)	Emperor of Later Liang; 907–912	Succeeded by Zhu Yougui (Prince of Ying)
Preceded by Emperor Ai of Tang	Emperor of China (most regions); 907–912	Succeeded by Zhu Yougui (Prince of Ying)
Preceded by Emperor Ai of Tang	Emperor of China (Beijing/Tianjin/Cangzhou region); 907–911	Succeeded by Liu Shouguang (Emperor of Yan)
Preceded by Emperor Ai of Tang	Emperor of China (Shijiazhuang/Hengshui region); 907–910	Succeeded by Wang Rong (Prince of Zhao)
Preceded by Emperor Ai of Tang	Emperor of China (Baoding region); 907–910	Succeeded by Wang Chuzhi (Prince of Beiping)
