= Lady Zhang (Zhu Quanzhong's wife) =

Chinese posthumous empress

Lady Zhang (張夫人, personal name unknown; died 904), titled Lady of Wei (魏國夫人) during her lifetime, later posthumously honored initially as Consort Zhang with the imperial consort title Xianfei (張賢妃) then as Empress Yuanzhen (元貞皇后, "the discerning and virtuous empress"), was the wife of Zhu Quanzhong, a major warlord at the end of the Chinese Tang dynasty, who would (after her death) found the Later Liang. Lady Zhang's son Zhu Youzhen would later be the final emperor of Later Liang.

== Background ==
It is not known when Lady Zhang was born. She was from a rich household in Dangshan (碭山, in modern Suzhou, Anhui), where Zhu Quanzhong was from as well. Despite her family's wealth, she married Zhu Quanzhong (who was then still named Zhu Wen) before he became prominent. She was the mother of his fourth son Zhu Youzhen.

== During Zhu Quanzhong's campaigns ==
After Zhu Quanzhong became a prominent warlord (military governor (jiedushi) of Xuanwu Circuit (宣武, headquartered in modern Kaifeng, Henan)), Lady Zhang, as his wife, was created the Lady of Wei. It was said that she was understanding, intelligent, and respectful, and even though Zhu was harsh and violent in his character, he feared her. He often consulted her on important decisions, and she often made the right decisions. It was often became of her intercession that people that he wanted to kill were saved. On one occasion, when Zhu had already embarked on a campaign, she believed that the campaign was unwise and sent a messenger to inform him of her opinion. Because of her opinion, he cancelled the campaign and returned.

In 893, she had the occasion to save Zhu's oldest son Zhu Youyu (朱友裕), who was not her son. At that time, Zhu Quanzhong had put Zhu Youyu in charge of sieging Pengcheng, the capital of Ganhua Circuit (感化, headquartered in modern Xuzhou, Jiangsu), then governed by Zhu Quanzhong's rival Shi Pu. Shi repeatedly challenged Zhu Youyu to battles, but Zhu Youyu refused to engage him. When Shi's ally Zhu Jin the military governor of Taining Circuit (泰寧, headquartered in modern Jining, Shandong) made an attempt to relieve the siege in early 893, Zhu Youyu, after defeating Zhu Jin and forcing him to flee, did not give chase. For both of these decisions, Zhu Quanzhong's adopted son Zhu Yougong (朱友恭), who was serving under Zhu Youyu, wrote Zhu Quanzhong secretly and made false accusations against Zhu Youyu. Zhu Quanzhong, in anger, issued a harshly-worded letter to Zhu Youyu's deputy Pang Shigu (龐師古), ordering him to take over the command from and investigate Zhu Youyu. The letter was accidentally sent to Zhu Youyu instead, and when Zhu Youyu received the letter, he feared punishment, so he abandoned his post and fled to Dangshan, to the house of his uncle, Zhu Quanzhong's older brother Zhu Quanyu (朱全昱) to take refuge there. When Lady Zhang heard about this, she persuaded Zhu Youyu to return to Xuanwu's capital Bian Prefecture (汴州) to meet his father. Under her direction, he knelt down and tearfully apologized. Zhu Quanzhong nevertheless seized him and was prepared to execute him, when Lady Zhang grabbed him and tearfully stated herself, "You have left your army and returned yourself to face the consequences. Nothing could show your intentions clearer." Hearing her statement, Zhu Quanzhong understood what she meant and released Zhu Youyu, sending him to govern Xu Prefecture (許州, in modern Xuchang, Henan) instead.

By 897, Zhu Quanzhong had finally defeated Shi, Zhu Jin, and Zhu Jin's cousin Zhu Xuan the military governor of Tianping Circuit (天平, headquartered in modern Tai'an, Shandong), seizing their territories. As part of his defeat of Zhu Jin (who fled south to Huainan Circuit (淮南, headquartered in modern Yangzhou, Jiangsu) to Huainan's military governor Yang Xingmi), Zhu Quanzhong captured Zhu Jin's wife and made her a concubine. When Lady Zhang, hearing the news of the victory, met Zhu Quanzhong at Fengqiu (封丘, in modern Xinxiang, Henan), Zhu Quanzhong informed her that he had taken Zhu Jin's wife as a concubine. She asked to see Zhu Jin's wife, and Zhu Jin's wife bowed down to her—as would appropriate when a concubine were meeting the wife. She bowed in return and stated:

Yan Prefecture [(兗州, Taining's capital, referring to Zhu Jin)] and Yun Prefecture [(鄆州, Tianping's capital, referring to Zhu Xuan)] had the same surname as the Sikong [(司空, one of the Three Excellencies, and was one of the titles that Zhu Quanhzong carried)], and had all agreed to be brothers. But because of small misunderstandings, campaigns were started against each other, such that you, my older sister, suffered this humiliation. One day, if Bian Prefecture would fall as well, I will suffer the same humiliation as you, older sister.

Zhu Quanzhong came to an understanding that Lady Zhang viewed this as inappropriate, and allowed Zhu Jin's wife to become a Buddhist nun. On one occasion when Zhu Quanzhong had just completed a campaign against Wang Ke the military governor of Hezhong Circuit (河中, headquartered in modern Yuncheng, Shanxi), defeating Wang and seizing Hezhong Circuit, and was poised to attack the major rival Li Keyong the military governor of Hedong Circuit (河東, headquartered in modern Taiyuan, Shanxi), he, upon hearing news that Lady Zhang was seriously ill, left the battlefield himself and quickly returned to Bian Prefecture.

== Death and posthumous honors ==
Lady Zhang died in 904. (It was said that after her death, Zhu Quanzhong became far more indiscriminating in pursuit of women, including, eventually, his daughters-in-law.) After Zhu Quanzhong took over the Tang throne and established a new Later Liang in 907 (as its Emperor Taizu), for reasons unclear in history, he did not posthumously honor her as empress, only as an imperial consort with the title of Xianfei (賢妃). After Zhu Youzhen became emperor in 913, he posthumously honored her as empress and reburied her at Zhu Quanzhong's tomb.

== Notes and references ==
- History of the Five Dynasties, vol. 11.
- New History of the Five Dynasties, vol. 13.
- Zizhi Tongjian, vols. 259, 261, 262.
