= Lai Prefecture =

Prefecture in imperial China

- Traditional Chinese: 萊州
- Simplified Chinese: 莱州
Transcriptions
Standard Mandarin
- Hanyu Pinyin: Lái Zhōu
- Wade–Giles: Lai^{2} Chou^{1}

Laizhou or Lai Prefecture was a zhou (prefecture) in imperial China, centering on modern Laizhou, Shandong, China. It existed (intermittently) from 585 until 1376.

The modern city of Laizhou, created in 1988, retains its name.

== Geography ==
The administrative region of Lai Prefecture during the Tang dynasty was in modern northeastern Shandong. It probably includes parts of modern:

- Under the administration of Yantai:
  - Laizhou
  - Laiyang
  - Haiyang
- Under the administration of Qingdao:
  - Jimo
  - Pingdu
  - Laixi

== See also ==
- Donglai Commandery
- Laizhou Prefecture
