= Zhou Ji (Tang dynasty) =

Chinese warlord of the Tang dynasty

Zhou Ji (Chinese: 周岌) was a Chinese warlord of the late Tang dynasty who seized control of Zhongwu Circuit (忠武, headquartered in modern Xuchang, Henan) in 880, briefly submitted to the agrarian rebel Huang Chao's new state of Qi, and later returned the Tang fold, controlling Zhongwu until he was forced to abandon it in 884 due to an attack by Lu Yanhong. Lu might have killed him subsequently.

== Seizure of Zhongwu Circuit ==
Little is known about Zhou Ji's background, as he did not have a biography in either of the official histories of Tang dynasty, the Old Book of Tang and the New Book of Tang. As of 880, he was serving as an officer of Zhongwu Circuit, under the military governor Xue Neng (薛能). In late 880, as part of the Tang operations to stop the northwestward advancement of the major agrarian rebel Huang Chao, many circuits in the east were ordered to send troops to Yin River (溵水, a major branch of the Shaying River). Xue sent Zhou with Zhongwu troops there. Before Zhou got there, however, there was a disturbance at Zhongwu's capital Xu Prefecture—as the soldiers from Ganhua Circuit (感化, headquartered in modern Xuzhou, Jiangsu), who were undisciplined but whom Xue thought he could control (as he had previously been the military governor of Ganhua), after Xue welcomed them into the city, were instead rioting and demanding various supplies. Zhou heard about the disturbance and returned to Xu Prefecture with his troops. He then attacked the Ganhua troops and slaughtered them. Further, resenting Xue for treating the Ganhua soldiers well, he expelled Xue. Xue tried to flee to Xiangyang, but mutineer soldiers under Zhou chased him down and slaughtered him and his family. Zhou claimed the title of acting military governor. As a result of Zhou's mutiny, Qi Kerang the military governor of Taining Circuit (泰寧, headquartered in modern Jining, Shandong), feared that Zhou would ambush him, and thus abandoned his position at Ru Prefecture (汝州, in modern Pingdingshan, Henan) and returned to Taining, causing the various circuits' troops gathered at Yin River to also abandon their positions. This allowed Huang an open path to the Tang imperial capital Luoyang. Faced with the Huang threat, the imperial government was unable to act against Zhou and almost immediately commissioned him as the military governor of Zhongwu. Huang was thereafter able to capture both Luoyang and the imperial capital Chang'an, forcing then-reigning Emperor Xizong to flee to Chengdu. Meanwhile, the Zhongwu officer Qin Zongquan, whom Xue had previously sent to help defend Cai Prefecture (蔡州, in modern Zhumadian, Henan), seized the prefecture. Zhou was himself unable to control Qin and therefore made him the prefect of Cai Prefecture.

== Submission to Huang Chao and resubmission to Tang ==
After Huang Chao captured Chang'an around the new year 881 and declared himself the emperor of a new state of Qi, Zhou Ji submitted to him. Qin Zongquan, however, refused to abide by that decision.

Zhou's submission to Qi did not last long, however. At a feast that he held for the Tang eunuch general Yang Fuguang, Yang persuaded him that righteousness required that he return to the Tang fold. They poured wine on the ground and swore over the wine. Yang further strengthened Zhou's resolve by having his adoptive son Yang Shouliang assassinate the Qi emissaries then at Zhongwu. Yang Fuguang subsequently gathered 8,000 soldiers from Zhongwu and divided them into eight corps, commanded by the officers Lu Yanhong, Jin Hui (晉暉), Wang Jian, Han Jian, Zhang Zao (張造), Li Shitai (李師泰), and Pang Cong (龐從), and took them on the campaign against Huang.

After Tang forces successfully forced Huang into abandoning Chang'an in early 883, Huang fled east and put Chen Prefecture (陳州, in modern Zhoukou, Henan) under siege in late 883. Chen's prefect Zhao Chou sought aid from the nearby military governors. Zhou, along with Shi Pu the military governor of Ganhua and Zhu Quanzhong the military governor of Xuanwu Circuit (宣武, headquartered in modern Kaifeng, Henan), all sent aid, but their forces together were not able to defeat Huang. They thus sought aid from one of the main contributors of the Tang campaign to recapture Chang'an, Li Keyong the military governor of Hedong Circuit (河東, headquartered in modern Taiyuan, Shanxi). Li Keyong did come to their aid and defeated Huang repeatedly, causing Huang to lift the siege on Chen Prefecture and flee further, but subsequent had a falling out with Zhu over Zhu's attempt to assassinate him. When Li Keyong sought food supplies from Zhou, Zhou claimed that he did not have adequate supplies himself, and Li Keyong left the region.

== Defeat by Lu Yanhong ==
Meanwhile, Lu Yanhong, after Yang Fuguang's death in 883, had taken his troops and become a roving marauder, raiding through Shannan East (山南東道, headquartered in modern Xiangfan, Hubei) and Shannan West (山南西道, headquartered in modern Hanzhong, Shaanxi) Circuits, despite the imperial government's attempt to appease him by making him the acting military governor of Shannan West. In fall 884, Lu advanced east and rendezvoused with two officers under Qin Zongquan (who had himself become a renegade to Tang by that point), Qin Gao (秦誥) and Zhao Deyin, to siege Shannan East's capital Xiang Prefecture (襄州). After capturing Xiang Prefecture, Lu raided parts of Wuchang (武昌, headquartered in modern Wuhan, Hubei) and Huainan (淮南, headquartered in modern Yangzhou, Jiangsu) Circuits and then headed for Xu Prefecture. Hearing of Lu's impending attack, Zhou Ji abandoned Zhongwu and fled. Lu took over Xu Prefecture and claimed the title of acting military governor; the imperial government, unable to stop him, subsequently commissioned him military governor. That was the last historical reference to Zhou, and it is not completely known what happened to him afterwards—although both the chronicles of Emperor Xizong's reign in the Old Book of Tang and the New Book of Tang indicated that Lu killed him.

== Notes and references ==
- Zizhi Tongjian, vols. 253, 254, 255, 256.
