= Wang Xianzhi (rebel) =

Chinese general and rebel (d. 878)

- Chinese: 王仙芝
Transcriptions
Standard Mandarin
- Hanyu Pinyin: Wáng Xiānzhī
- Wade–Giles: Wang Hsien-chih
- IPA: [wǎŋ ɕjɛ́n.ʈʂí]

Wang Xianzhi (died 878) was a Chinese military general and rebel. He was a major agrarian rebel during the reign of Emperor Xizong of Tang, whose rebellion (Huang Chao Rebellion), while failing, along with those of his one-time ally Huang Chao, began a series of rebellions that led to the Tang dynasty's disintegration.

== Life ==
=== Early life ===
Wang Xianzhi was from Pu Prefecture (濮州, in modern Puyang, Henan), and like his eventual ally Huang Chao was a salt bootlegger (i.e., selling salt that was not part of the Tang state monopoly).

=== Rebellion ===
He started his rebellion in 874 at Changyuan (長垣, in modern Xinxiang, Henan), in the midst of serious natural disasters—alternate floods and droughts—that severely affected the part of the empire east of the Hangu Pass (i.e., modern Henan, Hebei, and Shandong) that the imperial government was taking little action to relieve the people from the effects of. His rebellion began with a thousand men, but quickly, after he and his ally Shang Junzhang (尚君長) captured Pu and Cao (曹州, in modern Heze, Shandong), their forces increased to tens of thousands, and when the military governor (jiedushi) of Tianping Circuit (天平, headquartered in modern Tai'an, Shandong), Xue Chong (薛崇), tried to intercept Wang's forces, Wang defeated him. Meanwhile, Huang, who was from Yuanqu (also within modern Heze), also started a rebellion, and they were loosely aligned at this point with each other. Late in 875, Wang attacked Yi Prefecture (沂州, in modern Linyi, Shandong). Song Wei (宋威) the military governor of Pinglu Circuit (平盧, headquartered in modern Weifang, Shandong) then volunteered to attack Wang. Then-reigning Emperor Xizong approved the suggestion, and put Song in overall command of the operation, putting Song in command of not only troops from his own circuit but troops from many others.

In summer 876, Song attacked Wang at Yi Prefecture and defeated Wang. Song submitted a report claiming that Wang had been killed in battle. In response, Emperor Xizong demobilized the troops and allowed them to go home. However, several days later, reports arrived that Wang was not killed, and the troops were again mobilized, much to the soldiers' distress and anger. Wang then headed toward Ru Prefecture (汝州, in modern Zhumadian, Henan). Emperor Xizong ordered the generals Cui Anqian, Zeng Yuanyu (曾元裕), Cao Xiang (曹翔), and Li Fu (李福) to intercept Wang, but Wang quickly captured Ru Prefecture and took its prefect Wang Liao (王鐐), a younger brother of then lead-chancellor Wang Duo, prisoner. (Note: The Zizhi Tongjian, which provided the chronological details on Wang Xianzhi's campaign, actually referred to Wang Liao as Wang Duo's cousin, but according to Wang Duo's biographies in both the Old Book of Tang and the New Book of Tang, Wang Liao was Wang Duo's younger brother.) Wang Liao's being captured greatly shocked the people, and people were fleeing the eastern capital Luoyang in droves. Emperor Xizong tried to placate Wang and Shang by offering them imperial commissions, but they did not respond at this point. They attacked Zheng Prefecture (鄭州, in modern Zhengzhou, Henan), but after being repelled by the eunuch monitor Lei Yinfu (雷殷符), headed south and attacked Tang (唐州, in modern Zhumadian) and Deng (鄧州, in modern Nanyang, Henan) Prefectures. He then raided the various prefectures of Shannan East Circuit (山南東道, headquartered in modern Xiangfan, Hubei) and Huainan Circuit (淮南, headquartered in modern Yangzhou, Jiangsu).

=== Negotiations ===
Around the new year 877, Wang Xianzhi attacked Qi Prefecture (蘄州, in modern Huanggang, Hubei). During the attack, Wang Liao wrote letters on Wang Xianzhi's behalf to Pei Wo (裴偓) the prefect of Qi, who had a relationship with Wang Duo as well based on Wang Duo's having selected him as a successful imperial examinee; as a result, Wang Xianzhi and Pei negotiated a temporary armistice, and Pei tried to persuade Wang Xianzhi to submit to the Tang imperial government under promise that he would be pardoned and would receive a commission. He further invited Wang Xianzhi, Huang Chao, and some 30 of Wang Xianzhi's followers into the city, treating them to feasts. Pei then submitted petitions to Emperor Xizong, requesting that a commission be given to Wang Xianzhi.

When Pei's petition arrived at the imperial government, most of the chancellors opposed, arguing that several years prior, Emperor Xizong's father Emperor Yizong had refused to pardon the rebel Pang Xun and had been able to defeat Pang, and that pardoning Wang Xianzhi would encourage further rebellions. Wang Duo, however, persisted in requesting the acceptance of the proposal. Emperor Xizong thus agreed, issuing Wang commissions as an officer of the Left Shence Army (左神策軍) as well as imperial censor. When a eunuch emissary arrived at Qi Prefecture announcing the commissions, Wang Xianzhi was initially very pleased, and both Wang Liao and Pei congratulated him. However, upon hearing of the commissions, Huang was angry that he did not receive any commissions. He yelled at Wang Xianzhi and pronounced that if Wang Xianzhi accepted the commissions, he would be betraying his army, and he battered Wang Xianzhi, injuring Wang Xianzhi's forehead. Their other followers were also clamoring. Wang Xianzhi, in fear, refused to accept, and further had his army pillage Qi Prefecture, capturing half of the people and killing the other half. Pei and the eunuch fled, while Wang Liao was again captured. After this incident, however, Wang Xianzhi parted ways with Huang briefly.

In spring 877, Wang Xianzhi captured E Prefecture (鄂州, in modern Wuhan, Hubei). He then returned north, joining forces with Huang again, and they surrounded Song Wei at Song Prefecture (宋州, in modern Shangqiu, Henan). Only after the imperial general Zhang Zimian (張自勉) came to Song Wei's aid did the agrarian rebels release their hold on Song Wei. Wang Xianzhi then headed south, successively capturing An Prefecture (安州, in modern Xiaogan, Hubei) and Sui Prefecture (隨州, in modern Suizhou, Hubei), before further raiding Fu (復州, in modern Tianmen, Hubei) and Ying (郢州, in modern Jingmen, Hubei).

However, negotiations between Wang Xianzhi and the imperial forces soon resumed, as the eunuch monitor of Zeng Yuanyu's army, Yang Fuguang, again offered to seek an imperial commission for Wang Xianzhi if he submitted. The negotiations reached such a stage that Wang Xianzhi sent Shang Junzhang to personally meet with Yang to settle on details. When Shang was on the way to Yang's camp, however, Song ambushed Shang and captured him, and then submitted a report claiming to have captured Shang in battle. Despite Yang's report explaining that Shang was negotiating Wang Xianzhi's submission and had not been captured by Song, Shang was executed, ending the negotiations between the imperial government and Wang Xianzhi.

=== Defeat ===
Late in 877, Wang Xianzhi marched south and put Jiangling, the capital of Jingnan Circuit (荊南) under siege. He caught the military governor of Jingnan, Yang Zhiwen (楊知溫), surprised, and nearly captured the city. Li Fu, then the military governor of nearby Shannan East Circuit, however, sent forces to aid Yang, and Wang abandoned the siege on Jiangling.

Soon thereafter, Zeng Yuanyu had a major victory over Wang just east of Shen Prefecture (申州, in modern Xinyang, Henan), a victory that apparently convinced the imperial government to relieve Song Wei of his post as the commander of the operations and confer the post on Zeng instead, with Zhang Jimian serving as Zeng's deputy. Later in spring 878, Zeng again defeated Wang at Huangmei (黃梅, in modern Huanggang), and he killed Wang in battle. Wang's head was delivered to Chang'an and presented to Emperor Xizong. Wang's follower Shang Rang (Shang Junzhang's brother) took the remainder of Wang's followers and joined Huang Chao.
