= Shang Rang =

Shang Rang (尚讓) (died c. 884) was a major follower of Huang Chao, an agrarian rebel leader against the rule of the Chinese Tang dynasty and carried prominent titles after Huang declared himself the emperor of a new state of Qi. As Huang neared defeat in 884, Shang turned against him and submitted to the Tang general Shi Pu and participated in the final destruction of Huang's army. Shang himself was later killed by Shi.

== Background ==
It is not known when Shang Rang was born. He had at least one older brother, Shang Junzhang (尚君長), who, along with Wang Xianzhi, rose in rebellion against the Tang dynasty in 874 at Changyuan (長垣, in modern Xinxiang, Henan). Shang Rang probably followed his brother in this rebellion, and he, either at that time or subsequently, became a follower of Wang's as well.

== Service under Wang Xianzhi ==
As of 876, Shang Rang was a major agrarian rebel commander, as it is known that that year, Yang Fuguang the eunuch monitor of the army Emperor Xizong sent against Wang Xianzhi, reported that Shang Rang had occupied Mount Chaya (查牙山, in modern Zhumadian, Henan), forcing the imperial forces sent against him to withdraw to Deng Prefecture (鄧州, in modern Nanyang, Henan).

Late in 876, Wang, through the Tang official Wang Liao (王鐐), the cousin or brother of the chancellor Wang Duo, and Pei Wo (裴偓) the prefect of Qi Prefecture (蘄州, in modern Huanggang, Hubei), was negotiating a peaceful submission to Tang authority. Under Wang Duo's insistence, Emperor Xizong commissioned Wang Xianzhi an officer of the imperial Left Shence Army (左神策軍) and delivered the commission to Qi Prefecture. However, Wang Xianzhi's ally Huang Chao angrily objected, causing the rebel army to turn against the peace agreement. Wang Xianzhi, fearing the wrath of his own army, turned against Pei and pillaged Qi Prefecture. However, afterwards, the rebel army broke up into two groups, with one group following Wang Xianzhi and Shang Junzhang, and one group following Huang. Presumably, Shang Rang continued to follow Wang Xianzhi and his brother Shang Junzhang at this point, although soon thereafter, Shang Rang joined forces with Huang at Mount Chaya.

Yang, however, continued to negotiate with Wang Xianzhi, and in late 877, the talks had progressed to such a point that Wang Xianzhi sent Shang Junzhang to Yang's camp to negotiate further. However, the Tang general Song Wei (宋威), who was against the negotiations, ambushed Shang Junzhang's party and took him and the other rebels on the way to Yang's camp captive. He then submitted a report to Emperor Xizong claiming to have captured Shang Junzhang and the others in battle. Despite Yang's petition contradicting Song's claims and clarifying that Shang Junzhang and the others were negotiating, Emperor Xizong executed Shang Junzhang and the others, causing Wang Xianzhi to break off the negotiations.

In spring 878, the Tang general Zeng Yuanyu (曾元裕) defeated Wang Xianzhi and killed him in battle. Shang Rang took Wang Xianzhi's remnants and joined forces with Huang, serving under Huang thereafter.

== Service under Huang Chao ==
=== Before Huang's claim of imperial title ===
At the time that Shang Rang joined Huang Chao, Huang Chao was besieging Bo Prefecture (亳州, in modern Bozhou, Anhui). Shang supported Huang as the leader of the movement, and Huang subsequently claimed the title of Chongtian Dajiangjun (衝天大將軍, "Generalissimo Who Charges to the Heavens") and changed the era name to Wangba, to show independence from the Tang regime.

Shang subsequently followed Huang in his marauding south to modern Guangdong and then return north in 879. He participated in Huang's battle against the Tang general Li Xi (李係) at Tan Prefecture (in modern Changsha, Hunan), in which Huang crushed Li Xi's troops. Shang subsequently, with an army that claimed to be 500,000 strong, attacked Jiangling, causing Wang Duo, then overseeing the operations against Huang, to flee Jiangling. (After Wang's departure from Jiangling, Wang's officer Liu Hanhong pillaged Jiangling and started his own independent rebel campaign as well.) Subsequently, Huang and Shang attacked Shannan East Circuit (山南東道, headquartered in modern Xiangfan, Hubei), but were defeated by the Tang military governor (Jiedushi) of Shannan East, Liu Jurong (劉巨容) and another Tang general, Cao Quanzhen (曹全晸). Huang and Shang fled, but Liu and Cao failed to give chase, allowing Huang and Shang to regroup.

By late 880, Huang had crushed all Tang defense on his path to the Tang capital Chang'an, causing Emperor Xizong to flee to Chengdu. When Huang entered Chang'an, Shang declared to the people of Chang'an:

King Huang started his rebellion for the people, unlike the Lis [(i.e., the Tang imperial clan)] who do not love you. You can all rest easy and not fear.

Despite Shang's declaration, Huang's rebel soldiers often pillaged the city, and neither Huang nor Shang was able to stop them. Soon thereafter, Huang claimed imperial title and declared a new state of Qi. He gave Shang the titles of Taiwei (太尉, one of the Three Excellencies) and Zhongshu Ling (中書令, i.e., head of the legislative bureau of government (中書省), one of the chancellors).

=== During Huang's state of Qi ===
As the Tang general Zheng Tian continued to resist Qi at the nearby Fengxiang Circuit (鳳翔, headquartered in modern Baoji, Shaanxi), in spring 881, Huang Chao sent Shang Rang and Wang Bo (王播), with 50,000 troops, to attack Zheng. The Qi forces took Zheng lightly, considering Zheng (who was formerly a Tang chancellor) a civilian who did not know military matters, and Zheng, along with Tang Hongfu (唐弘夫), laid a trap for Qi troops at Longwei Slope (龍尾陂, in modern Baoji), crushing them there.

Meanwhile, at Chang'an, an anonymous person wrote poems satirizing the Qi officials at the executive bureau (尚書省, Shangshu Sheng). Shang, in anger, gouged out the eyes of the government workers who were on duty and hung them upside down, while arresting all in the city who were capable of writing poetry, putting some 3,000 of them to death.

Soon thereafter, Tang forces under the commands of Tang Hongfu, Wang Chongrong, Wang Chucun, Tuoba Sigong, and Zheng surrounded Chang'an, and Huang briefly withdrew from Chang'an. However, once Tang forces entered Chang'an, they began pillaging the city and were bogged down in their progress. Huang thus counterattacked and retook the city, dealing Tang forces heavy losses. Subsequently, Tang and Qi forces repeatedly engaged in battles outside the city with indecisive results. In one of those battles in fall 881, Shang joined forces with Zhu Wen to repel the Tang generals Li Xiaochang (李孝昌) and Tuoba at the East Wei River Bridge, near Chang'an. However, when Shang attacked Yijun Camp (宜君寨, in modern Tongchuan, Shaanxi) in fall 882, he encountered a serious snowstorm, causing some 20-30% of his army to freeze to death.

By spring 883, Tang forces, with the Shatuo chieftain Li Keyong joining the Tang cause, were again pressuring the Qi forces at Chang'an. Shang commanded some 150,000 Qi soldiers and engaged the forces of Li Keyong, Wang Chongrong, Wang Chucun, and Yang Fuguang. The Qi forces were crushed. Meanwhile, the Qi generals Wang Fan (王璠) and Huang Kui (黃揆, Huang Chao's brother) recaptured Hua Prefecture (華州, in modern Weinan, Shaanxi), but Li Keyong then put it under siege. Huang Chao thus sent Shang to Hua Prefecture, trying to lift the siege. Soon thereafter, however, Huang Chao abandoned the Chang'an region entirely and fled east, and it appeared that Shang followed him.

As Huang Chao marched east, he put Chen Prefecture (陳州, in modern Zhoukou, Henan) under siege. Shang was by this point stationing his troops at Taikang. Huang had Chen Prefecture under siege for 10 months but was unable to capture it. Meanwhile, Li Keyong arrived with several other circuits' troops and attacked Shang, capturing Taikang, as well as Xihua (西華, in modern Zhoukou as well), defended by Huang's brother Huang Siye (黃思鄴), forcing Shang and Huang Siye to flee. Only then did Huang Chao become apprehensive and abandon the siege on Chen Prefecture.

Huang Chao then changed target, deciding to attack Bian Prefecture (汴州, in modern Kaifeng, Henan), where Zhu Wen—who had by this point submitted to Tang and was serving as Tang's military governor of Xuanwu Circuit (宣武, headquartered at Bian Prefecture), and had changed his name to Zhu Quanzhong—was. Shang took 5,000 cavalry soldiers and made the initial attack on Bian Prefecture, but he was fought off by Zhu's officers Zhu Zhen (朱珍) and Pang Shigu (龐師古). Li Keyong, hearing that Huang was attacking Bian Prefecture, quickly followed, and crushed the Qi forces as they were crossing the Yellow River north. Shang surrendered to Shi Pu the military governor of Ganhua Circuit (感化, headquartered in modern Xuzhou, Jiangsu), one of the Tang generals participating in the campaign.

== Submission to Tang and death ==
Shang Rang then came under Shi Pu's command, and Shi sent Li Shiyue (李師悅) and Shang to chase after Huang Chao. They caught up with Huang at Xiaqiu (瑕丘, in modern Jining, Shandong) and crushed his forces. Nearly all of Huang's forces were eliminated by this point, and he fled into Langhu Valley (狼虎谷, in modern Laiwu, Shandong). Huang's nephew Lin Yan (林言) then killed Huang, his brothers, his wife, and his children, and tried to surrender with their heads, but was on the way killed by Tang soldiers, who presented his, as well as their, heads to Shi.

What happened to Shang thereafter was not clearly stated in historical resources, but at some point, it was said that Shi killed him, and his wife Lady Liu became a concubine of Shi's—yet later becoming Zhu Quanzhong's concubine, and then the wife of Zhu's trusted subordinate Jing Xiang.

== Notes and references ==
- Old Book of Tang, vols. 252, 253, 254, 255, 256.
