= Shi Pu =

Chinese warlord of Tang Dynasty

Shi Pu (時溥) (d. May 9, 893), formally the Prince of Julu (鉅鹿王), was a warlord of the late Tang dynasty, who controlled Ganhua Circuit (感化, headquartered in modern Xuzhou, Jiangsu) as its military governor (Jiedushi). He was eventually defeated by Zhu Quanzhong's general Pang Shigu (龐師古), and committed suicide with his family.

== Background and seizure of Ganhua Circuit ==
It is not known when Shi Pu was born, but it is known that he was from Pengcheng and served as an officer at Xu Prefecture (whose seat was at Pengcheng). Both he and fellow officer Chen Fan (陳璠) were favored by Zhi Xiang (支詳) the military governor (Jiedushi) of Ganhua Circuit (感化, headquartered at Xu Prefecture).

In 881, after the agrarian rebel Huang Chao captured the imperial capital Chang'an, forcing then-ruling Emperor Xizong to flee, Zhi sent Shi and Chen with an army to try to aid the emperor. When Shi reached the eastern capital Luoyang, however, he claimed to receive an order from Zhi to withdraw, and after rendezvous with Chen, they slaughtered Heyin (河陰, in modern Luoyang) and pillaged Zheng Prefecture (鄭州, in modern Zhengzhou, Henan) before returning to Xu Prefecture. Zhi tried to placate them by treating them and their soldiers well, but Shi had his trusted soldiers meet with Zhi and threaten him, forcing him to yield the command to Shi, who took the title of acting military governor. Chen tried to persuade Shi to kill Zhi, pointing out that Zhi had treated the people of the circuit well and might be able to return to power. Shi refused, and instead had Zhi escorted to Emperor Xizong's then-location at Chengdu. On the way, however, Chen laid an ambush for Zhi and slaughtered his family. Subsequently, Emperor Xizong confirmed Shi as acting military governor and, later in the year, full military governor. (Shi made Chen the prefect of Su Prefecture (宿州, in modern Suzhou, Anhui), but had him executed when he proved to be violent and corrupt as prefect.)

== Campaign against Huang Chao ==
In spring 882, when Emperor Xizong commissioned the chancellor Wang Duo as the overall commander of the operations against Huang Chao, he gave Shi Pu the title of director of army supplies, under Wang's command.

In 883, after Huang abandoned Chang'an and fled east, Shi mobilized his troops and stationed them at Yin River (溵水, a major branch of the Shaying River) to try to stop Huang's movement, and Emperor Xizong gave him the title of the commander on the eastern front. Around the same time, there was an incident where Shi suffered from food poisoning and suspected his staff member Li Ninggu (李凝古) of poisoning him, and so put Li Ninggu to death. At that time, Li Ninggu's father Li Sun (李損) was an advisory official at the imperial government. Shi accused Li Sun of being complicit and bribed the powerful eunuch Tian Lingzi to have Li Sun put to death. Li Sun was arrested, but his life was spared due to the intercession of the chancellor Xiao Gou.

Meanwhile, Huang's army put Chen Prefecture (陳州) and its prefect Zhao Chou under siege. Shi, along with Zhu Quanzhong the military governor of Xuanwu Circuit (宣武, headquartered in modern Kaifeng, Henan) and Zhou Ji the military governor of Zhongwu Circuit (忠武, headquartered in modern Xuchang, Henan) all launched troops to try to save Zhao. Shi was said to have repeated victories over the armies of Huang and his vassal Qin Zongquan the military governor of Fengguo Circuit (奉國, headquartered in modern Zhumadian, Henan). However, these three military governors did not feel that they could stand up to Huang on their own, so they sought aid from Li Keyong the military governor of Hedong Circuit (河東, headquartered in modern Taiyuan, Shanxi) — who had been instrumental in Tang's recapture of Chang'an. After Li Keyong arrived and defeated Huang's army at Chen Prefecture, Huang's major general Shang Rang surrendered to Shi.

Li Keyong subsequently withdrew from the front after getting into a dispute with Zhu and surviving an assassination attempt Zhu made against him. Shi, however, continued the pursuit against Huang, and sent his officer Li Shiyue (李師悅) and Shang to go after Huang. Huang fled into Langhu Valley (狼虎谷, in modern Heze, Shandong), where his nephew Lin Yan (林言) killed him, preparing to surrender his head to Shi — but on the way, Lin was intercepted by irregular Shatuo (i.e., Li Keyong's soldiers left in the area) and Boye Army (博野軍) soldiers, who killed him and seized Huang's head to present to Shi. For Shi's contributions in destroying Huang, he was made acting Taiwei (太尉, one of the Three Excellencies), given the honorary chancellor title of Zhongshu Ling (中書令), and created the Prince of Julu.

== Campaign against Qin Zongquan ==
Despite Huang Chao's destruction, however, Qin Zongquan continued to retain an army and continued to pillage the nearby circuits, and in 885 claimed the title of emperor. Emperor Xizong commissioned Shi Pu to serve as the overall commander against Qin. (Despite Shi's title as overall commander, however, it is unclear what Shi's acts were during the subsequent Tang military actions against Qin were, as the historical records largely described only Zhu Quanzhong's battles with Qin.)

In 887, with Huainan Circuit (淮南, headquartered in modern Yangzhou, Jiangsu) embroiled in warfare, with a number of parties contending for it (including Qin Yan, Yang Xingmi, and Qin Zongquan's general Sun Ru), the imperial government, intending to calm the warfare, made Zhu Quanzhong the military governor of Huainan, in addition to Xuanwu. Zhu Quanzhong commissioned Yang, who had by that point captured Huainan's capital Yang Prefecture (揚州), deputy military governor and Li Fan (李璠) as acting military governor. Zhu wrote to Shi Pu, requesting passage for Li Fan to pass through Ganhua on the way to Huainan, but Shi was resenting the fact that the imperial government gave the post of Huainan's military governorship to Zhu and not to him despite his higher seniority. When Li Fan reached Si Prefecture (泗州, in modern Chuzhou, Anhui), which was part of Ganhua, Shi laid an ambush for him, which Li Fan was only able to escape due to the fervent fighting by the officer escorting him, Guo Yan (郭言). From that point on, the rivalry between Xuanwu and Ganhua became open warfare. (Zhu was ultimately unable to take control of Huainan due to Yang's resistance and Shi's interference.)

In spring 888, the imperial government replaced Shi as the overall commander against Qin Zongquan with Zhu. After Qin Zongquan suffered repeated defeats, his general Shen Cong (申叢) arrested him in late 888 and surrendered to Zhu. This led to a dispute between Zhu and Shi over whose accomplishment it was that Qin was destroyed, and their relationship deteriorated even more.

== Campaign against Zhu Quanzhong ==
With Qin Zongquan destroyed, Zhu Quanzhong was able to act against Shi Pu. In spring 889, Zhu's officer Pang Shigu captured Suqian (宿遷, in modern Suqian, Jiangsu), and advanced onto Lüliang (呂梁, in modern Xuzhou). Shi tried to engage him, but was defeated and forced to flee back to Xu Prefecture. Another Xuanwu officer, Zhu Zhen (朱珍) then captured Xiao (蕭縣, in modern Suzhou). Zhu Quanzhong himself soon arrived, killed Zhu Zhen for killing another officer Li Tangbin (李唐賓), and then tried to attack Shi himself, but encountered torrential rains and withdrew. When Shi asked for aid from Li Keyong, Li Keyong sent his officer Shi Junhe (石君和) to aid Shi Pu.

In summer 890, Zhang Yun (張筠), an officer at Su Prefecture, which had apparently fallen to Zhu Quanzhong earlier, expelled the Zhu Quanzhong-commissioned prefect Zhang Shaoguang (張紹光) and reverted the allegiance to Shi Pu. Zhu Quanzhong, in response, attacked Su Prefecture himself. When Shi Pu tried to aid Zhang Yun by pillaging Dangshan (碭山, in modern Suzhou), Zhu Quanzhong sent his son Zhu Youyu to engage Shi Pu. Zhu Youyu defeated Shi Pu, capturing Shi Junhe in the battle.

In summer 891, Zhu Quanzhong's officer Ding Hui put Su Prefecture under siege. Zhang Yun surrendered to Ding in winter 891, and Shi Pu's officer Liu Zhijun subsequently surrendered to Zhu Quanzhong as well. It was said that Liu's surrender dealt a heavy blow to Shi Pu's army, which was not able to recover from it.

The protracted warfare between Xuanwu and Ganhua laid waste the three prefectures that Ganhua still controlled at that point — Xu, Si, and Hao (濠州, in modern Chuzhou), leaving the farmers unable to farm and the food supplies dwindling, particularly in light of major flooding in spring 892. Forces that Li Keyong, Zhu Xuan the military governor of Tianping Circuit (天平, headquartered in modern Tai'an, Shandong), and Zhu Xuan's cousin Zhu Jin the military governor of Taining Circuit (泰寧, headquartered in modern Jining, Shandong) sent were all unable to help Shi fight Zhu's attack off. In spring 892, Shi sought a peaceful resolution, and Zhu agreed, but required that as part of the resolution, Shi be recalled to the imperial government and that the imperial government send a replacement for Shi. When Zhu reported this resolution to the imperial government, then-reigning Emperor Zhaozong (Emperor Xizong's brother and successor) commissioned the chancellor Liu Chongwang as Shi's replacement and recalled Shi to Chang'an to serve as a senior advisor to the Crown Prince — an honorary position. Shi, however, became fearful that Zhu was only intending to trick him into leaving Xu Prefecture and then kill him once he left, and therefore refused to yield his post to Liu. Liu thus returned to Chang'an.

Meanwhile, Shi had sent an army south to capture Chu Prefecture (楚州, in modern Huai'an, Jiangsu), which Zhu had taken over. In summer 892, Yang Xingmi sent his officers Zhang Xun (張訓) and Li Decheng to contend for Chu as well, and they defeated Shi's army and then captured Chu Prefecture, capturing its Zhu-commissioned prefect Liu Zan (劉瓚). In winter 892, Zhang Sui (張璲) the prefect of Hao Prefecture and Zhang Jian (張諫) the prefect of Si Prefecture surrendered to Zhu, leaving Shi only in control of Xu. Zhu Quanzhong had sent Zhu Youyu to attack Tianping's Pu Prefecture (濮州, in modern Heze) earlier, and after Zhu Youyu captured Pu Prefecture around the same time, Zhu Quanzhong sent him to Xu to command the siege against Shi Pu.

In spring 893, Shi counterattacked and killed Guo Yan at Su Prefecture. With Zhu Jin arriving with an aid force from Taining, Zhu Youyu and another Xuanwu officer, Huo Cun (霍存), engaged Shi and Zhu Jin, defeating them. Zhu Jin fled back to Taining, although Shi subsequently killed Huo in battle. Subsequently, Zhu Youyu again put Xu Prefecture under siege, refusing to engage Shi when Shi challenged him. Zhu Quanzhong's adoptive son Zhu Yougong (朱友恭) thus falsely accused Zhu Youyu of being complicit with Shi and Zhu Jin. Zhu Quanzhong nearly killed Zhu Youyu, but subsequently released him and replaced him with Pang. Pang continued to siege Xu for months and finally captured it. Shi took his family and ascended Swallow Tower (燕子樓), and then set a fire to kill themselves in the fire. Zhu Quanzhong took over Ganhua.
