= Mount Chaya =

Mountain in China

Chaya-shan
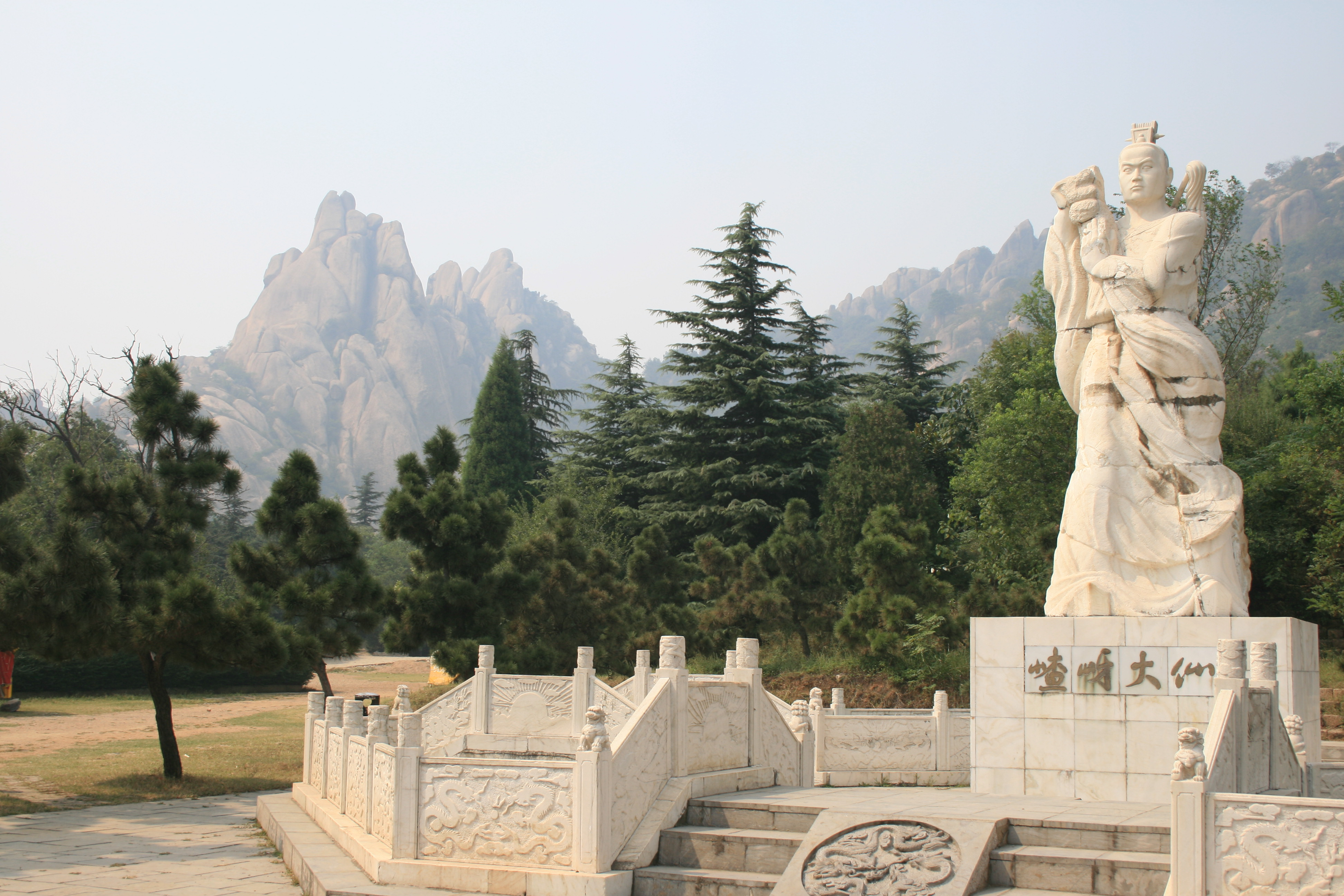
- Statue with the granitic features of Mount Chaya in the background.

Highest point
- Elevation: 514 m (1,686 ft)
- Coordinates: 33°8′3″N 113°43′42″E

Geography
- Location within Henan
- Country: China
- Province: Henan
- Prefecture: Zhumadian

Mount Chaya, also known as Chaya Mountain, is a mountain, geological feature, scenic spot and tourist attraction in Zhumadian, Henan. It is one of the AAAAA Tourist Attractions of China, a list of the most important and best-maintained tourist attractions in the People's Republic of China.

== History ==
Mount Chaya was occupied by rebel agrarian leader Shang Rang in 876CE during the Tang dynasty, leading to a retreat of Tang forces back to Deng Prefecture in modern Nanyang, Henan. It is also the location where Shang Rang joined forces with fellow rebel leader Huang Chao later in the same year.

== Geology ==
Mount Chaya is a granitic formation, composed of Yanshanian granite (formed 140 million to 120 mya). This granite displays interesting geomorphological features. It was designated a Geopark in 2004.

== In popular culture ==
Mount Chaya was a filming location for CCTV's 1986 adaptation of Journey to the West.

== Gallery ==
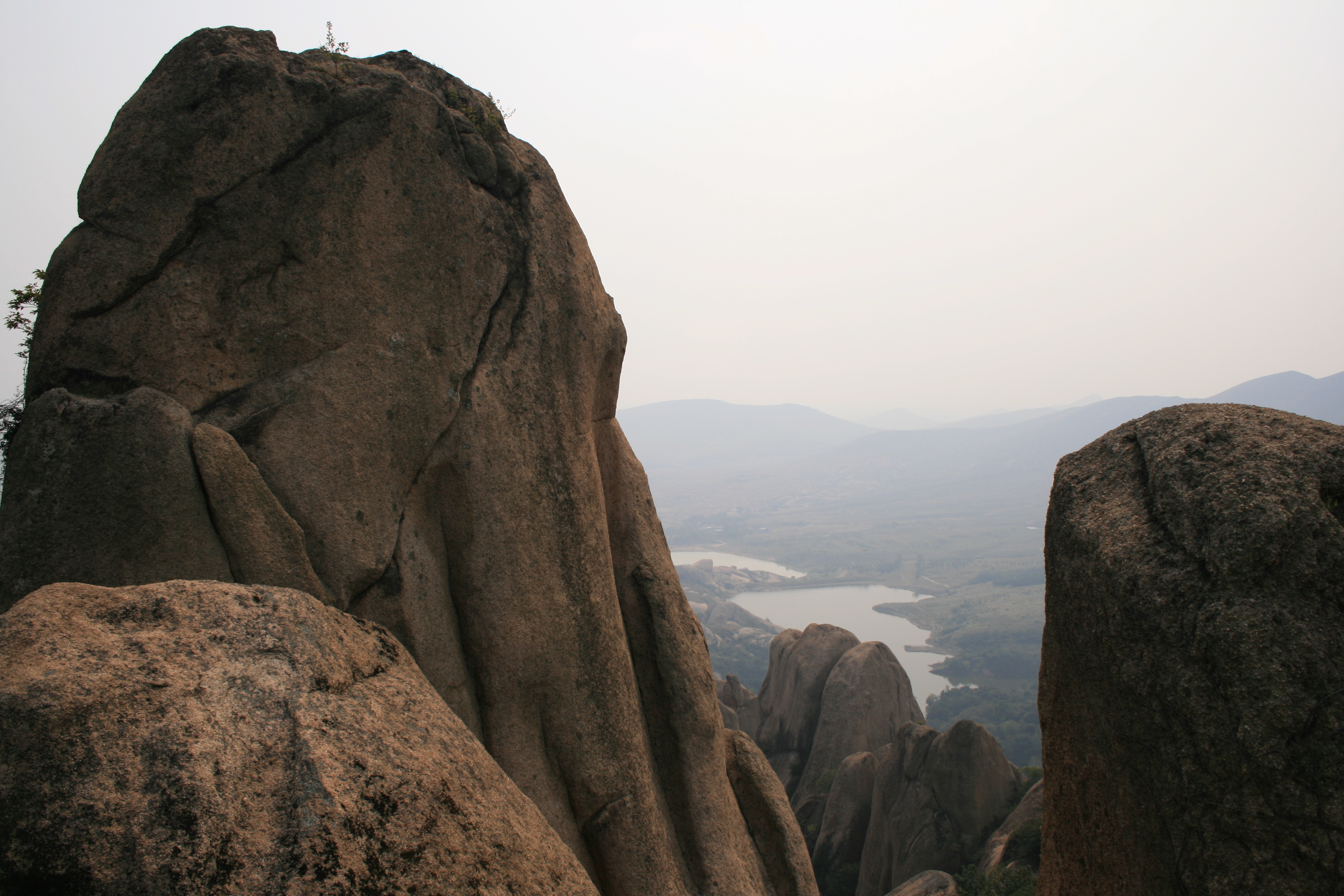

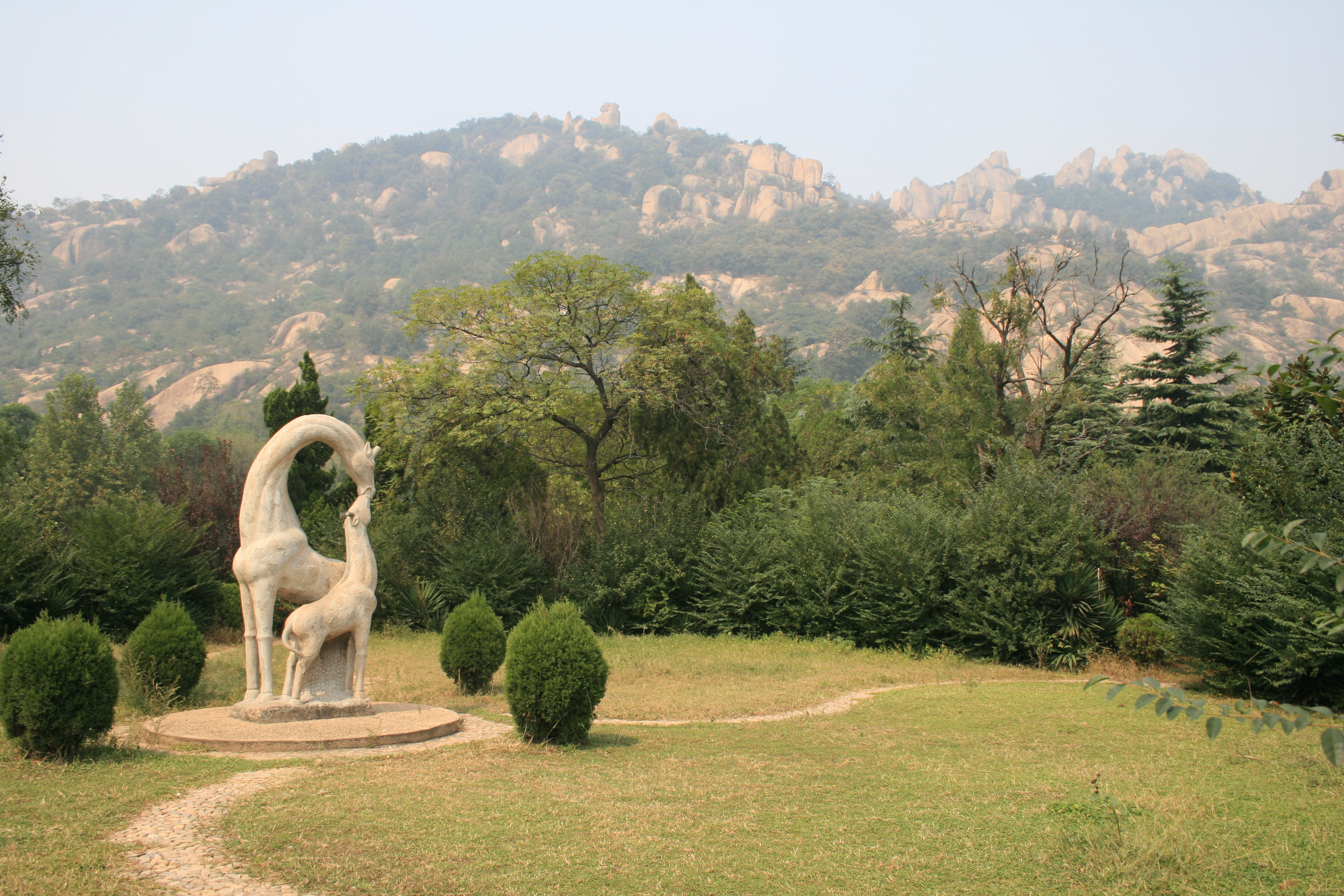

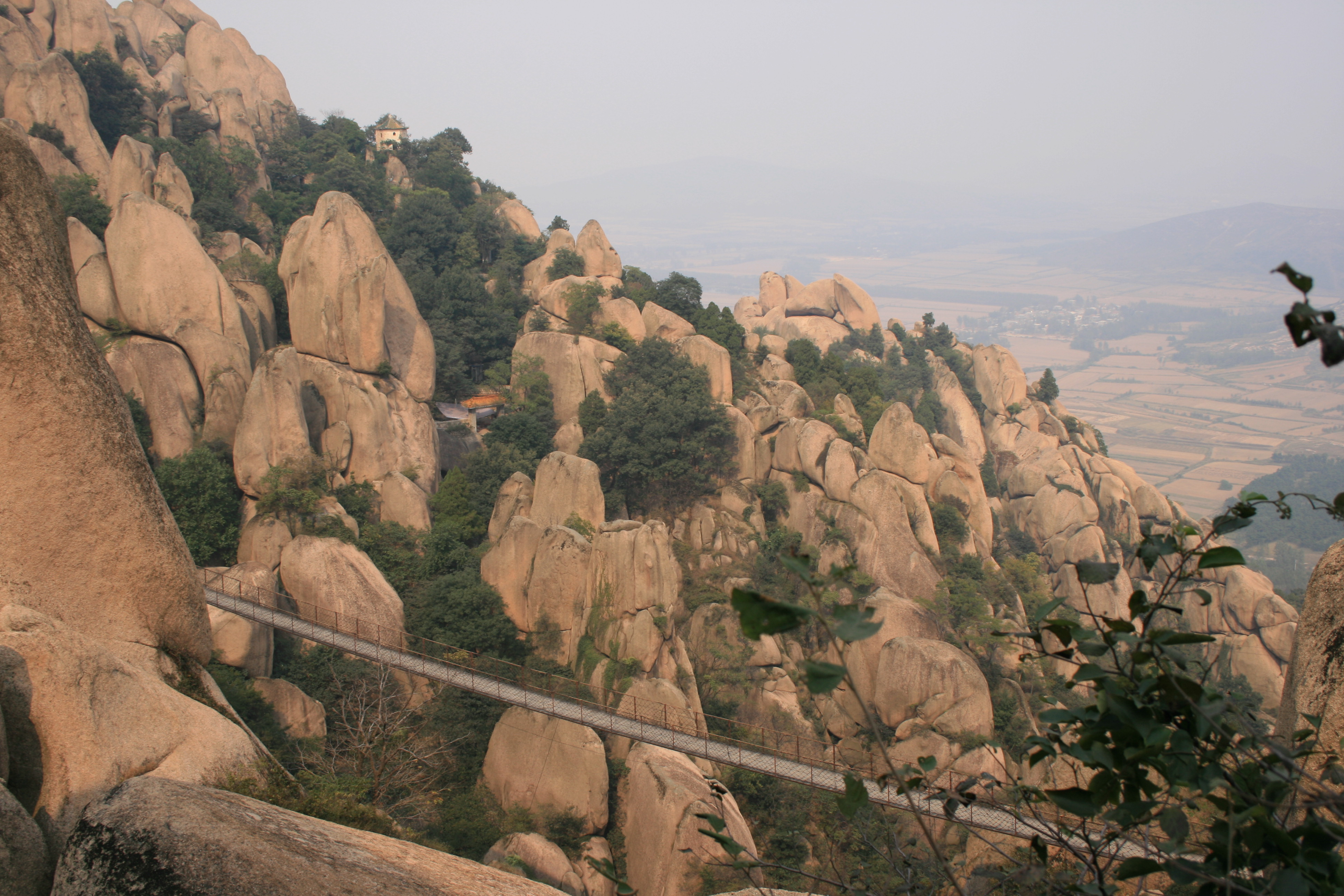

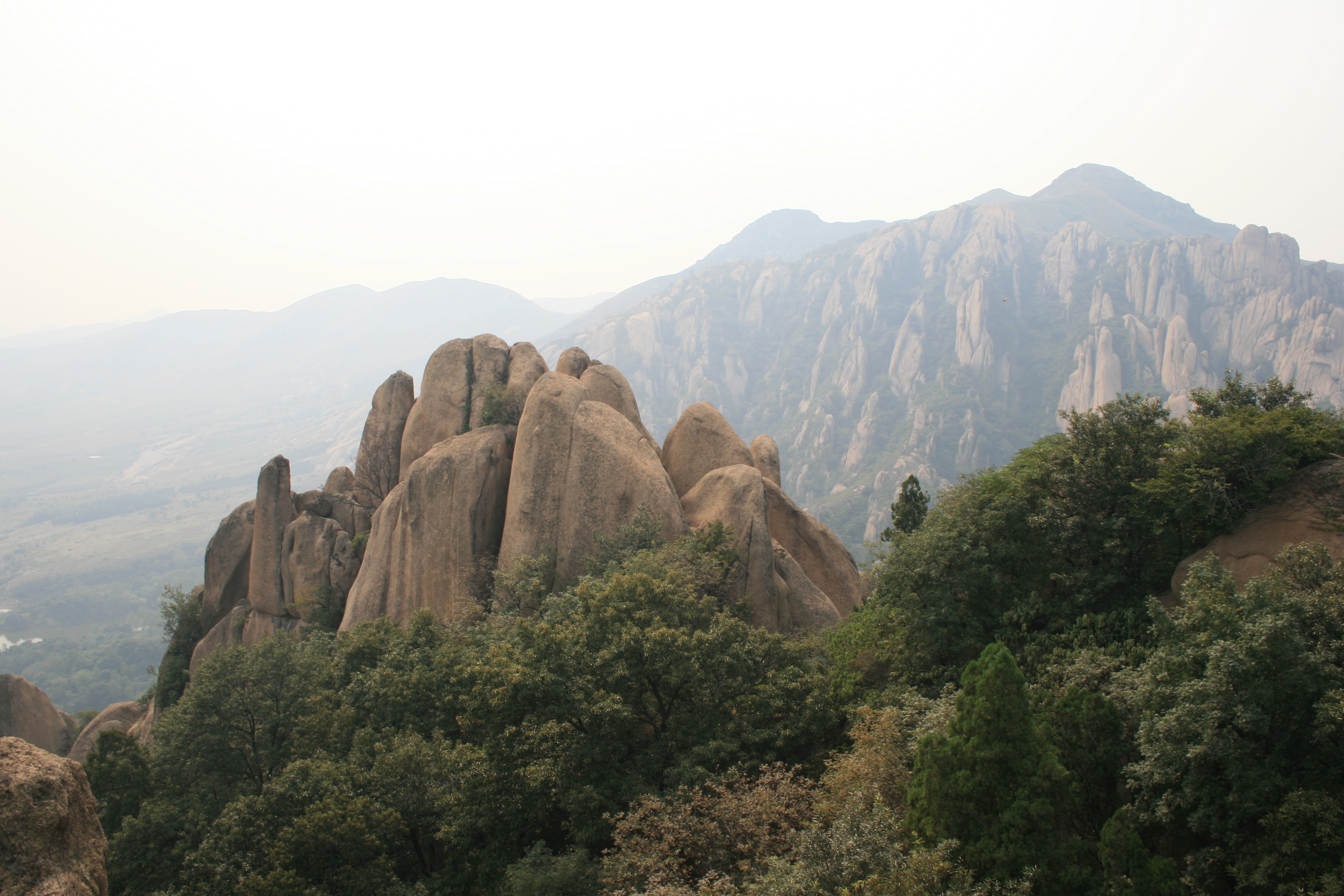

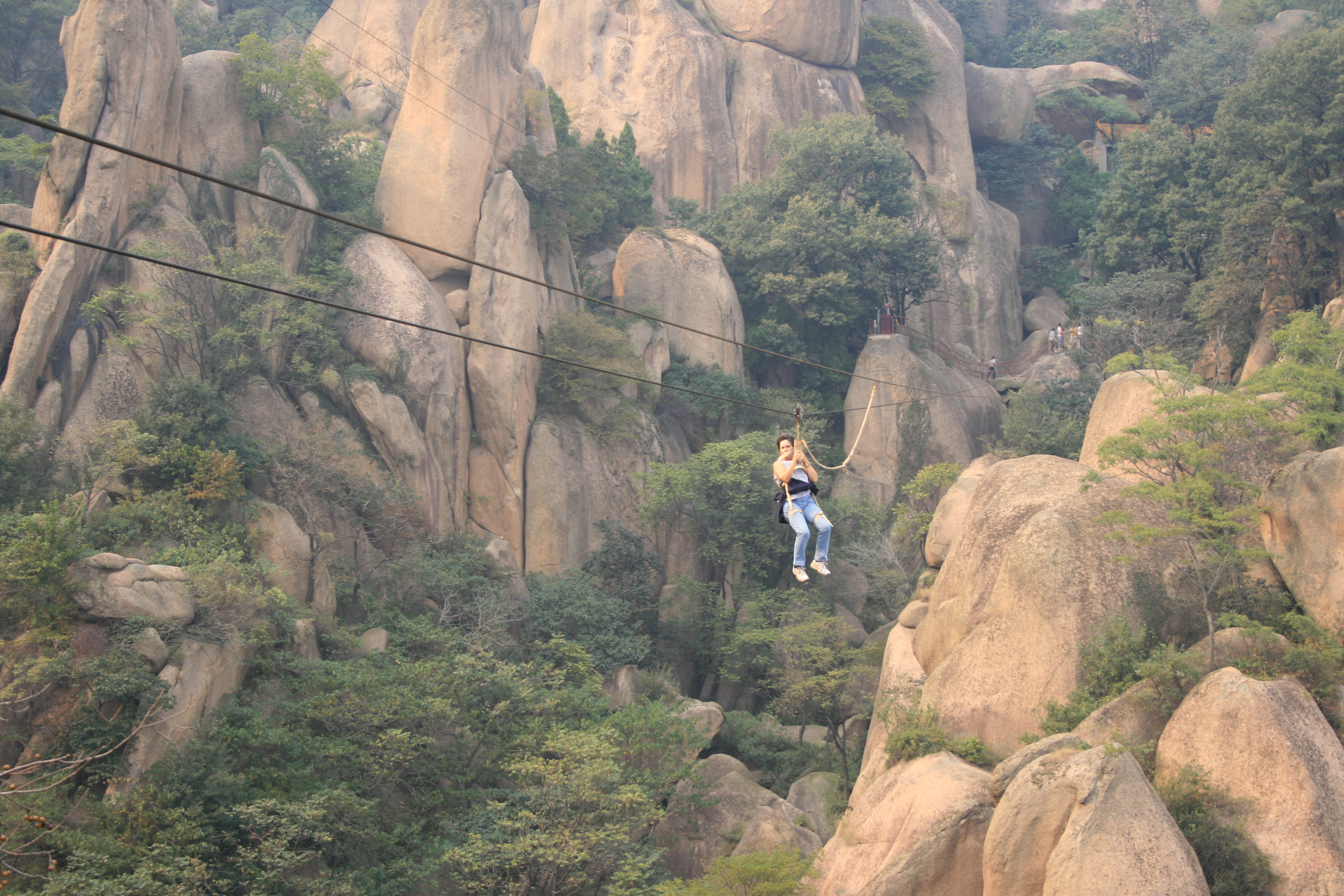

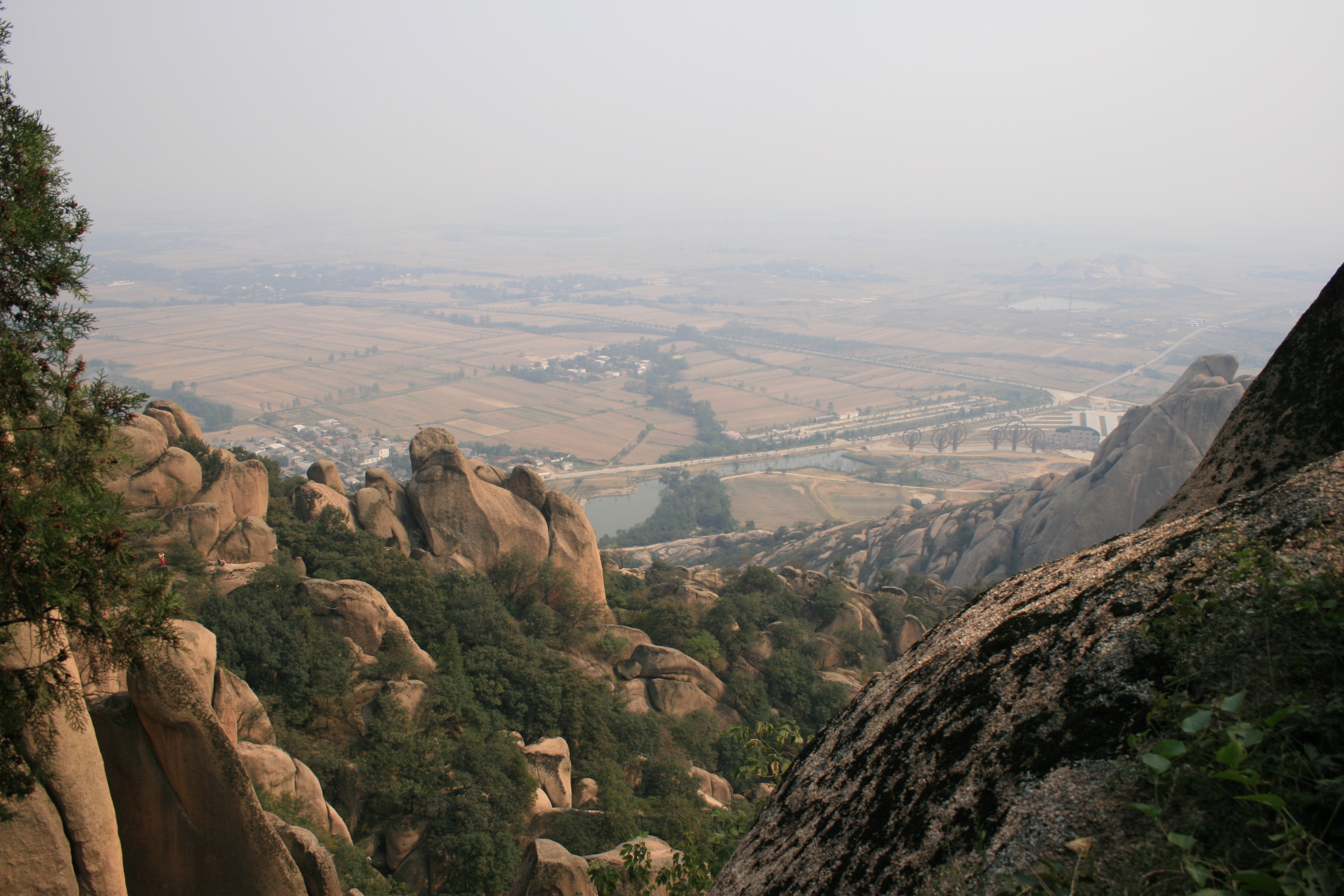

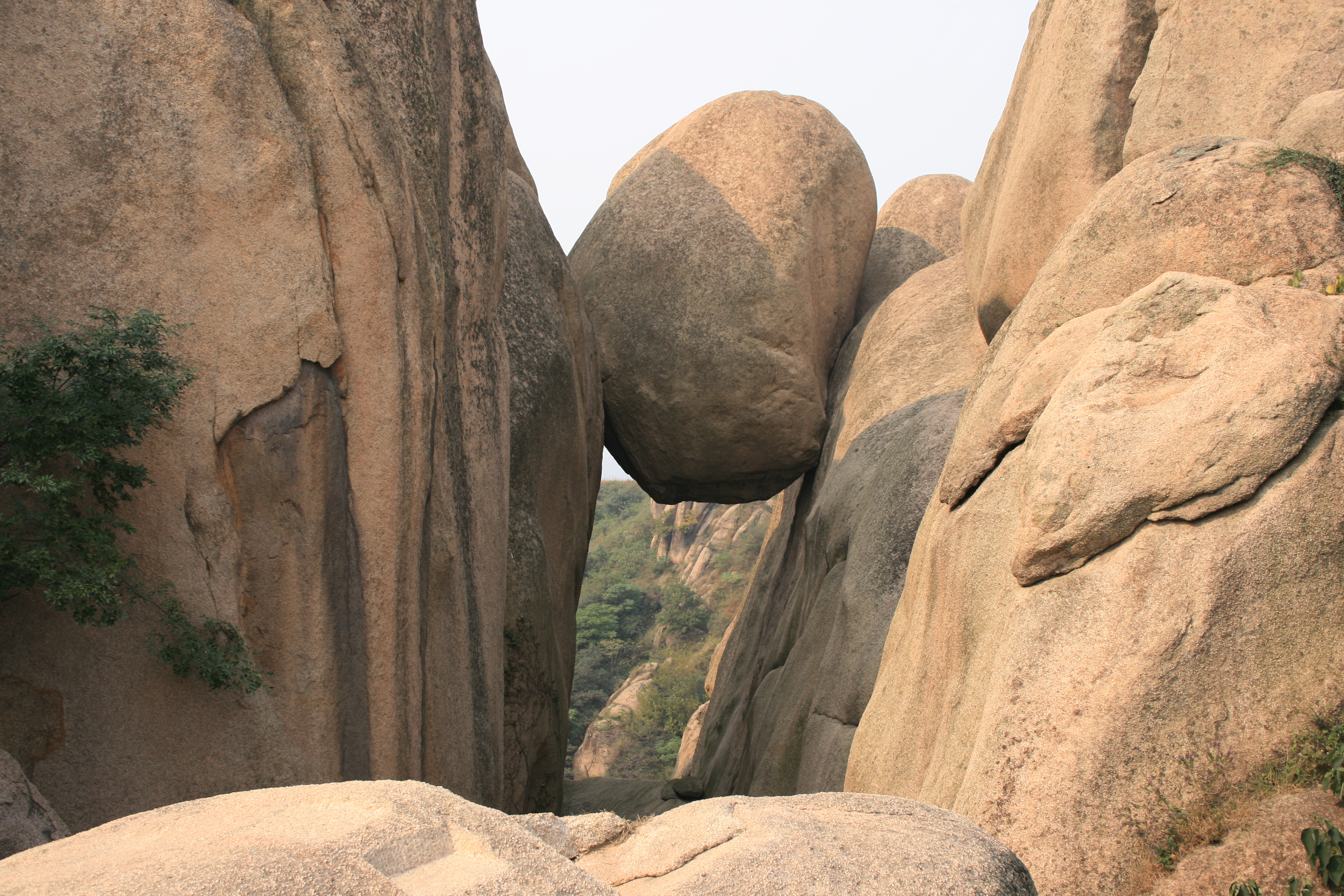

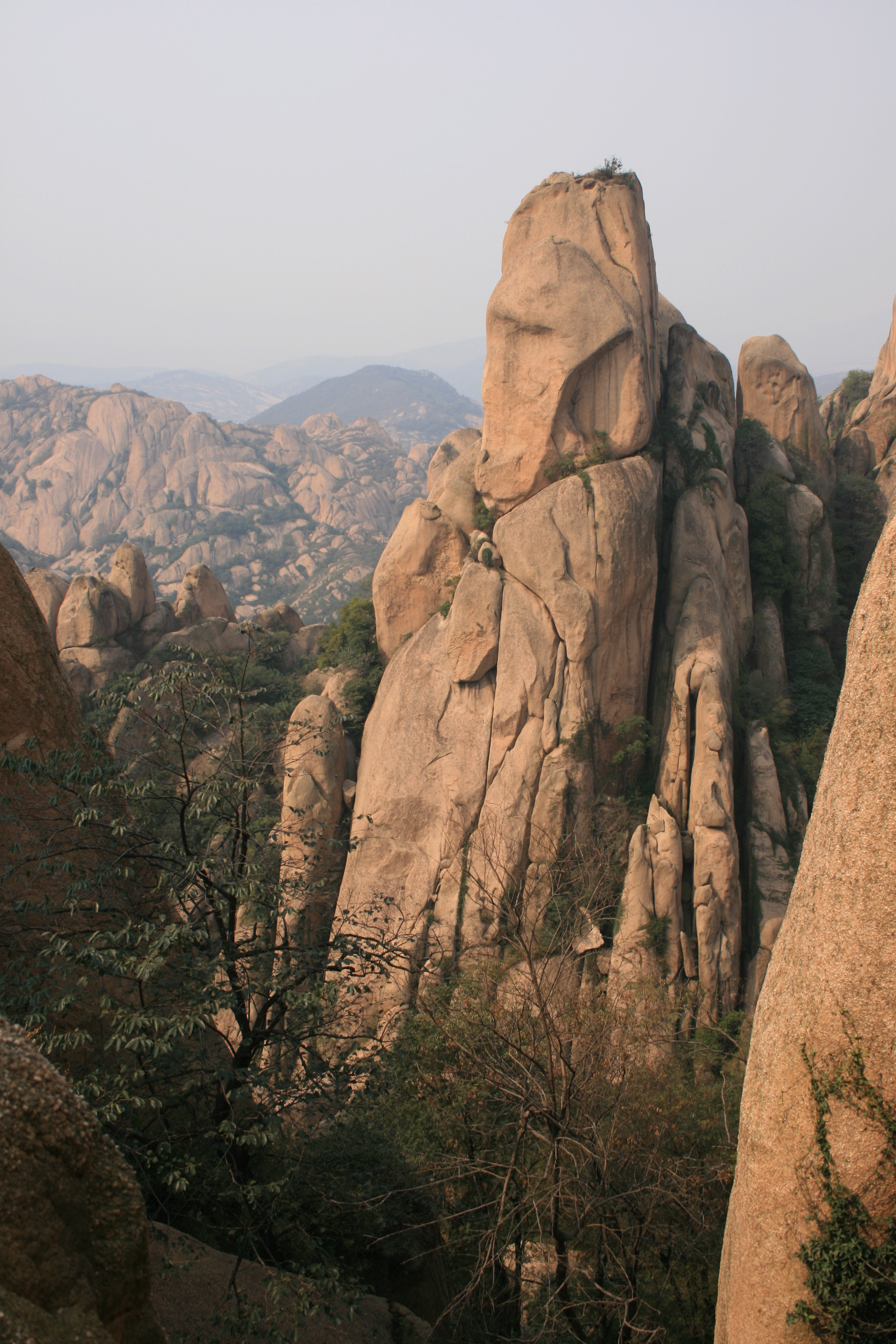
