= Empress Cao (Huang Chao's wife) =

Chinese empress (died 884)

Empress Cao (曹皇后, personal name unknown) (died July 13, 884?) was the wife of Huang Chao, a major agrarian rebel against the rule of the Chinese Tang dynasty during the reign of Emperor Xizong.

Nothing is known about the future Empress Cao's background, including when she married Huang or whether she bore any children for Huang. The only firm historical reference to her was around the new year 881, when Huang declared himself the emperor of a new state of Qi and created her empress. His Qi state was eventually defeated by Tang forces, and in 884, he was killed by his own nephew Lin Yan (林言) at Langhu Valley (狼虎谷, in modern Laiwu, Shandong). Lin also killed Huang's brothers, wife — presumably Empress Cao — and children, and planned to deliver their heads to the Tang general Shi Pu the military governor of Ganhua Circuit (感化, headquartered in modern Xuzhou, Jiangsu). However, on the way to Shi's camp, Lin was intercepted by Tang soldiers who were ethnic Shatuo and those belonging to the Boye Army (博野軍), and those soldiers killed Lin, taking those heads that he planned to present to Shi, along with his head, and presented all of them to Shi.
