= Yu Cong =

Yu Cong (于琮; died 881), courtesy name Liyong (禮用), was an official of the Chinese Tang dynasty, serving as a chancellor during the reign of his brother-in-law Emperor Yizong. After the agrarian rebel Huang Chao captured the imperial capital Chang'an in 880 and established his own Qi state, he tried to recruit Yu to serve as his chancellor, but Yu refused and was executed.

== Background ==
It is not known when Yu Cong was born. He was a descendant of the early Tang dynasty chancellor Yu Zhining, and his great-grandfather Yu Xiulie (于休烈) was a prominent official during the reign of Emperor Suzong. His father Yu Ao (于敖) served during the reign of Emperor Jingzong and was an associate of then-leading chancellor Li Fengji, dying in 830 during the subsequent reign of Emperor Jingzong's brother Emperor Wenzong. Yu Cong was probably his fourth son, and Yu Cong's three older brothers, Yu Qiu (于球), Yu Guī (于珪), and Yu Guì (于瓌, note different character and tone), as well as Yu Cong, all passed the imperial examinations in the Jinshi class. However, it was said that although Yu Cong was ambitious, he was not well respected by the people at the time, and he was stuck in administrative positions, despite his heritage.

== During Emperor Xuānzong's reign ==
During the Dazhong era (847–860) of Emperor Wenzong's uncle Emperor Xuānzong, the imperial scholar (翰林學士, Hanlin Xueshi) Zheng Hao (鄭顥), who was highly honored and who had married Emperor Xuānzong's daughter Princess Wanshou, was said to be impressed with Yu Cong's talents, and Zheng was also friendly with Yu's family. At that time, Emperor Xuānzong was trying to select husbands for his other daughters among the prominent clans, but the sons of those prominent clans were avoiding being selected. Zheng made the comment to Yu:

You, young man, have much talent, but as you do not pay attention to details, you are put down in your reputation, and therefore you are stuck in your position. Are you willing to accept such a selection?

Yu agreed. Zheng thus informed the official Li Fan (李藩), who was in charge of selecting officials for promotion that year. According to Yu's biography in the Old Book of Tang, Li Fan then had Yu made an advisory official, so that he could be set to marry a princess. This appeared to coincide with a record in the Zizhi Tongjian that showed that in 859, Yu was promoted from the position of copyeditor (校書郎, Xiaoshu Lang) at the Palace Library to be Zuo Shiyi (左拾遺), a low-level advisory official at the examination bureau of government (門下省, Menxia Sheng). In any case, Emperor Xuānzong was initially ready to give Yu, in marriage, his daughter Princess Yongfu, but after Princess Yongfu, during a dinner she had with Emperor Xuānzong, had an emotional outburst during an argument in which she threw her chopsticks onto the ground, Emperor Xuānzong concluded that she was unsuitable to be a wife of a scholar, and therefore instead had Yu marry another daughter of his, Princess Guangde.

== During Emperor Yizong's reign ==
During the middle of the Xiantong era (860–874) of Emperor Xuānzong's son and Yu Cong's brother-in-law Emperor Yizong, Yu was made Shuibu Langzhong (水部郎中), a supervisory official at the ministry of public works (工部, Gongbu), as well as imperial scholar. He was later made Zhongshu Sheren (中書舍人), a mid-level official at the legislative bureau (中書省, Zhongshu Sheng). Eight months later, he was made deputy minister of defense (兵部侍郎, Bingbu Shilang) and the director of taxation. In 867, he was given the designation Tong Zhongshu Menxia Pingzhangshi (同中書門下平章事), making him a chancellor de facto.

Not much is known about Yu's service as chancellor, other than that, later, when Wei Baoheng (the husband of Emperor Yizong's favorite daughter Princess Tongchang) was also made a chancellor, Yu, who was more senior than Wei, did not respect Wei, and therefore, Wei spoke ill of Yu to Emperor Yizong. In 872, Yu was therefore sent out of the capital to serve as the military governor (jiedushi) of Shannan East Circuit (山南東道, headquartered in modern Xiangfan, Hubei), but just three months later, he was further demoted to be the titular teacher of Emperor Yizong's son Li Yan the Prince of Pu, but with his office at the eastern capital Luoyang. Many officials who were accused of being friendly with him were also demoted. Soon thereafter, Yu was further demoted to be the prefect of Shao Prefecture (韶州, in modern Shaoguan, Guangdong). Princess Guangde chose to accompany him to Shao Prefecture and, during the entire journey, she kept a close watch on him; it was said that it was only because of this that Yu was not murdered.

== During Emperor Xizong's reign ==
Emperor Yizong died in 873 and was succeeded by Li Yan (as Emperor Xizong). Soon thereafter, Wei Baoheng lost power and was himself exiled and then ordered to commit suicide. Soon thereafter, Yu Cong was made an advisor to the Crown Prince—an entirely honorary post because there was no crown prince at the time—and soon thereafter again, in 874, the military governor of Shannan East Circuit. At a later point, he was recalled to Chang'an to serve as You Pushe (右僕射), one of the heads of the executive bureau (尚書省, Shangshu Sheng).

In 879, by which time the agrarian rebel Huang Chao was hovering near Guang Prefecture (廣州, in modern Guangzhou, Guangdong), and the imperial government was considering trying to quell Huang's rebellion by offering him a position in the imperial government, Huang initially demanded to be the military governor of Tianping Circuit (天平, headquartered in modern Tai'an, Shandong) (where Huang was from originally), and after the imperial government refused, he instead demanded to be the military governor of Lingnan East Circuit (嶺南東道, headquartered at Guang Prefecture). Yu opposed, stating, "Guang Prefecture is where the foreign ships and the markets for precious items gather. How can it be given to a bandit?" Subsequently, Emperor Xizong offered Huang an officer position in the imperial guards. Huang, insulted, fiercely sieged Guang Prefecture and captured it, killing the military governor Li Tiao (李迢).

By 880, Huang had returned to central China and, with Tang forces sent to stop him collapsing on their own, headed directly for Chang'an. Emperor Xizong fled toward Xichuan Circuit (西川, headquartered in modern Chengdu, Sichuan). Many Tang officials who were not able to catch up with Emperor Xizong hid themselves at Chang'an, and Yu apparently did so as well, but was discovered by Huang, who by that point had declared himself emperor of a new state of Qi. Huang offered the chancellor post to Yu, but Yu refused, and thus was executed. According to Yu's biographies in the Old Book of Tang and the New Book of Tang, Princess Guangde was spared, but she committed suicide. The Zizhi Tongjian, however, had a more dramatic account where it was said that Princess Guangde publicly vowed to die with her husband, and, at his execution, grabbed the hands of the executioner to stop the executioner from beheading Yu, and the executioner thus killed both her and Yu.

== Notes and references ==
- Old Book of Tang, vol. 149.
- New Book of Tang, vol. 104.
- Zizhi Tongjian, vols. 250, 252, 253, 254.
