= Huang Chao =

Chinese rebel leader (835–884)

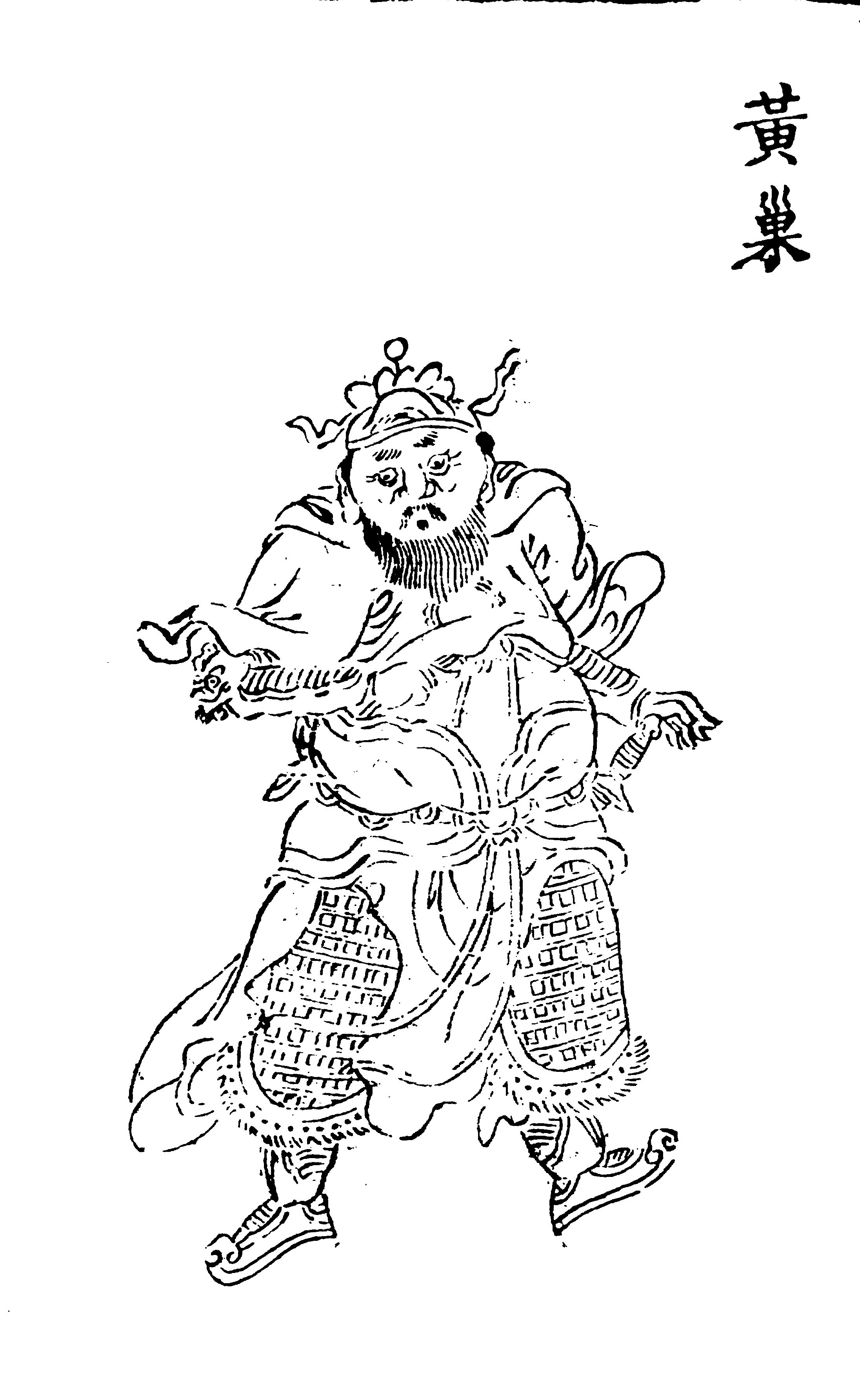

Emperor of Qi
- Reign: January 16, 881 – July 13, 884
- Born: 835; Yuanqu, Cao Prefecture (present-day Heze, Shandong)
- Died: July 13, 884 (48–49); Langhu Valley (present-day Laiwu, Shandong)
Full name
- Family name: Huáng (黃); Given name: Cháo (巢)
Era dates
- Wángbà (王霸) 878–880; Jīntǒng (金統) 881–884
Regnal name
- Emperor Chengtian Yingyun Qisheng Ruiwen Xuanwu (承天應運啓聖睿文宣武皇帝)
- House: Huang
- Dynasty: Huang Qi (黃齊)

Huang Chao
- Traditional Chinese: 黃巢
- Simplified Chinese: 黄巢
Transcriptions
Standard Mandarin
- Hanyu Pinyin: Huáng Cháo
- Wade–Giles: Huang^{2} Ch'ao^{2}
- IPA: [xwǎŋ ʈʂʰǎʊ]

Huang Chao (835 – July 13, 884) was a wealthy Chinese salt trader and soldier who is primarily known for instigating the Huang Chao Rebellion, which severely weakened the Tang dynasty. In 881, he proclaimed himself emperor of the newly established Qi dynasty, and held the title until his death in 884.

Huang Chao had worked many years as a salt trader before joining Wang Xianzhi's rebellion against the Tang dynasty in the mid-870s. After splitting with Wang, his army turned south and conquered Guangzhou. In 881, his troops captured the Tang capital Chang'an, forcing Emperor Xizong to flee. Huang Chao then took the throne and reigned for almost four years, but was eventually defeated in battle by Tang army led by the Shatuo chieftain Li Keyong in 883 and forced to desert and escape Chang'an. Following successive defeats, including to former subordinates Zhu Wen and Shang Rang who had surrendered to Tang, Huang Chao was allegedly killed by his nephew Lin Yan, although the reports are inconclusive.

== Background ==
The Tang dynasty, established in 618 A.D., had already passed its golden age and entered its long decline beginning with the An Lushan Rebellion by general An Lushan. The Tang dynasty recovered its power decades after the An Lushan rebellion and was still able to launch offensive conquests and campaigns like its destruction of the Uyghur Khaganate in Mongolia in 840–847. It was the Huang Chao rebellion in 874–884 by the native Han rebel Huang Chao that permanently destroyed the power of the Tang dynasty. The power of the jiedushi or provincial military governors increased greatly after imperial troops crushed the rebels. The discipline of these generals also decayed as their power increased, the resentment of common people against the incapacity of the government grew, and their grievances exploded into several rebellions during the mid-9th century. Many impoverished farmers, tax-burdened landowners and merchants, as well as many large salt smuggling operations, formed the base of the anti-government rebellions of this period. Wang Xianzhi and Huang Chao were two of the important rebel leaders during this era.

It is not known when Huang was born, but it is known that he was from Yuanqu (within the present-day Cao County of Heze, Shandong). His family had been salt privateers for generations (with the salt trade officially monopolized by the state ever since the Anshi Rebellion), and the Huang family became wealthy from smuggling. It was said that Huang was capable in swordsmanship, riding, and archery, and was somewhat capable in writing and rhetoric. He used his wealth to take in desperate men who then served under him. He had at least one older brother, Huang Cun (黃存), and at least six younger brothers, Huang Ye (黃鄴) or Huang Siye (黃思鄴), Huang Kui (黃揆), Huang Qin (黃欽), Huang Bing (黃秉), Huang Wantong (黃萬通), and Huang Sihou (黃思厚). He repeatedly participated in the imperial examinations, but was not able to pass them, and thereafter resolved to rebel against Tang rule.

== As Emperor of Qi ==
In 881, Huang Chao moved into the Tang palace in Chang'an and declared himself the emperor of a new state of Qi. He made his wife, Lady Cao, empress, while making Shang Rang, Zhao Zhang (趙璋), and the Tang officials Cui Qiu (崔璆) and Yang Xigu (楊希古) chancellors. Huang initially tried to simply take over the Tang imperial mandate, as he ordered that the Tang imperial officials of the fourth rank or lower (in Tang's nine-rank system) continue to remain in office, as long as they showed submission by registering with Zhao, removing only the third-rank or above officials. The Tang officials who would not submit were executed en masse. Huang also tried to persuade Tang generals throughout the circuits to submit to him, and a good number of them did, including Zhuge Shuang (諸葛爽) (whom he made the military governor of Heyang Circuit (河陽, headquartered in modern Jiaozuo, Henan)), Wang Jingwu the military governor of Pinglu Circuit (平盧, headquartered in modern Weifang, Shandong), Wang Chongrong (whom he made the military governor of Hezhong Circuit (河中, headquartered in modern Yuncheng, Shanxi), and Zhou Ji (whom he made the military governor of Zhongwu Circuit) — although each of those generals eventually redeclared loyalty to Tang and disavowed Qi allegiances. He also tried to persuade the former Tang chancellor Zheng Tian, the military governor of nearby Fengxiang Circuit (鳳翔, headquartered in modern Baoji, Shaanxi), to submit, but Zheng resisted, and when he sent Shang and Wang Bo (王播) to try to capture Fengxiang, Zheng defeated Qi forces that he sent in spring 881.

Tang forces were still not making a true attempt to recapture Chang'an by this point. However, the ethnic Shatuo general Li Keyong — who had been a Tang renegade for years but who had recently resubmitted to Tang and offered to attack Qi on Tang's behalf, arrived at Tong Prefecture in winter 882 to join the other Tang forces. In spring 883, Li Keyong and the other Tang generals defeated a major Qi force (150,000 men) commanded by Shang and approached Chang'an. In summer 883, Li Keyong entered Chang'an, and Huang was unable to resist him, and so abandoned Chang'an to flee east. With Tang forces again boggled down in pillaging the city, they were unable to chase Huang, and Huang was able to flee east without being stopped.

Later Huang headed toward Taining's capital Yan Prefecture. Shi Pu's officer Li Shiyue (李師悅), along with Shang, engaged Huang at Yan Prefecture and defeated him, annihilating nearly the remainder of his army, and he fled into Langhu Valley (狼虎谷, in modern Laiwu, Shandong). On July 13, 884, Huang's nephew Lin Yan (林言) killed Huang, his brothers, his wife, and his children, and took their heads to prepare to surrender to Shi. On his way to Shi's camp, however, he encountered Shatuo and Boye Army irregulars, who killed him as well and took the heads to present to Shi. (However, according to an alternative account in the New Book of Tang, Huang, believing that it was the only way that any of his army could be saved, committed suicide after instructing Lin to surrender with his head.)

=== Legend of possible escape ===
Some speculate that Lin Yan bringing the alleged heads of Huang Chao and others to Shi Pu was only a decoy to allow the real Huang Chao to escape. It was noted that Langhu Valley was over 500 li or 3–4 days away on a horseback from Shi's camp in Xu Prefecture, and decomposition would have already kicked in during the hot summer to make the faces unrecognizable. Moreover, Huang Chao had a number of brothers following him and the siblings likely resembled each other.

Legends popular during the ensuing Five Dynasties and Ten Kingdoms period claim that Huang became a Buddhist monk following his escape. The Song dynasty scholar Wang Mingqing (王明清), for example, alleged in his book Huizhu Lu: "When Zhang Quanyi was the mayor (留守) of the Western Capital (i.e. Luoyang), he recognized Huang Chao from among the monks."

== Poetry ==
He wrote a few poems that were lyrical even when expressing anger and violence. One such line reads:

The capital's full of golden armored soldiers (滿城盡帶黃金甲)

This poem was used to describe his preparations for rebellion in an angry spirit. Later, this phrase was used for the Chinese name of the 2006 film Curse of the Golden Flower. The Hongwu Emperor, founder of the Ming dynasty (1368-1644), wrote a similar poem.

== See also ==
- Empress Cao (Huang Chao's wife)
- Shang Rang

== Sources ==
- Gernet, Jacques (1996), A History of Chinese Civilization (2nd ed.), New York: Cambridge University Press, ISBN 978-0-521-49781-7

Preceded by Emperor Xizong of Tang	Emperor of China (Guanzhong region); 881–884	Succeeded by Emperor Xizong of Tang
