= Zhumadian =

Zhumadian 驻马店市 Chumatien
- Prefecture-level city
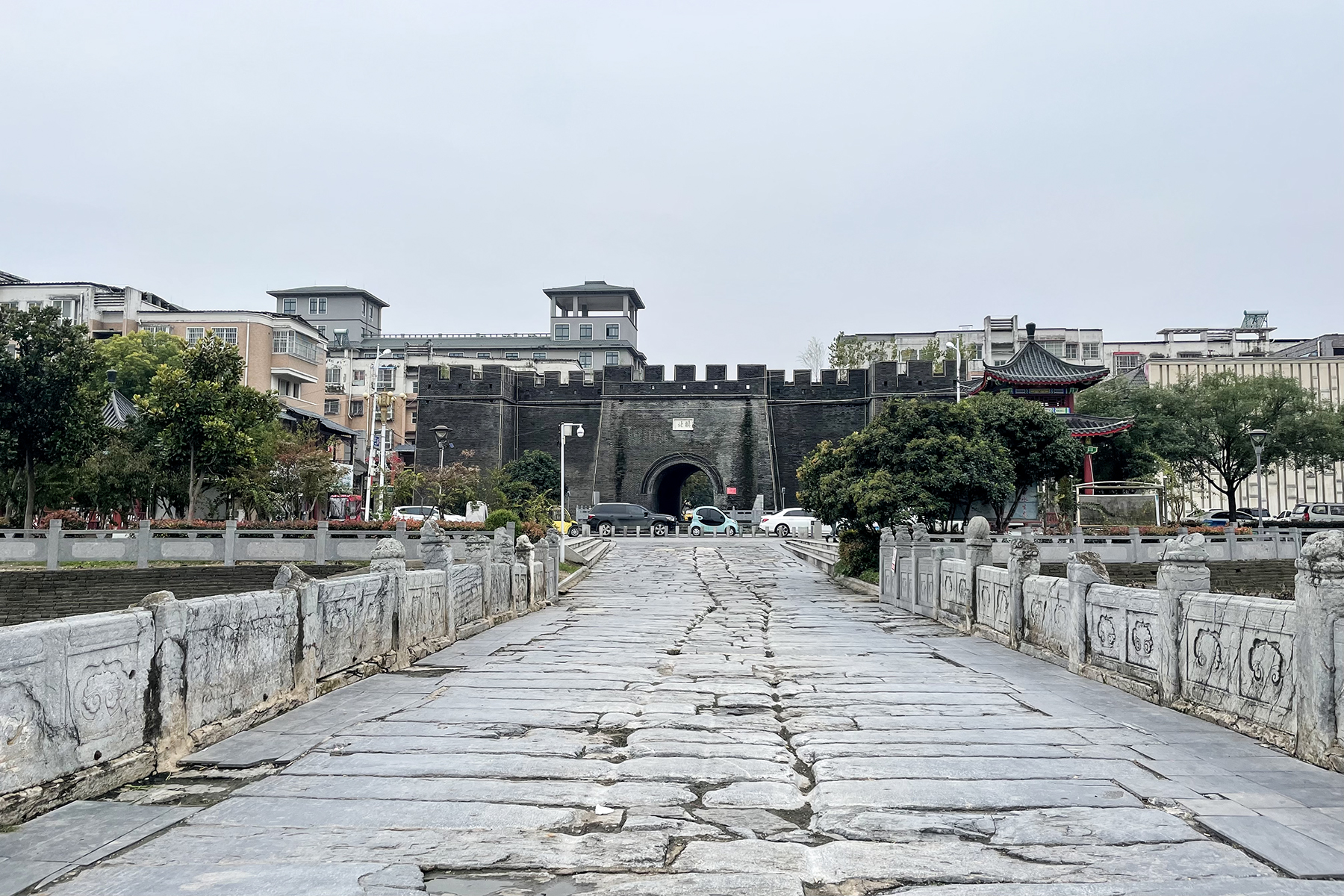
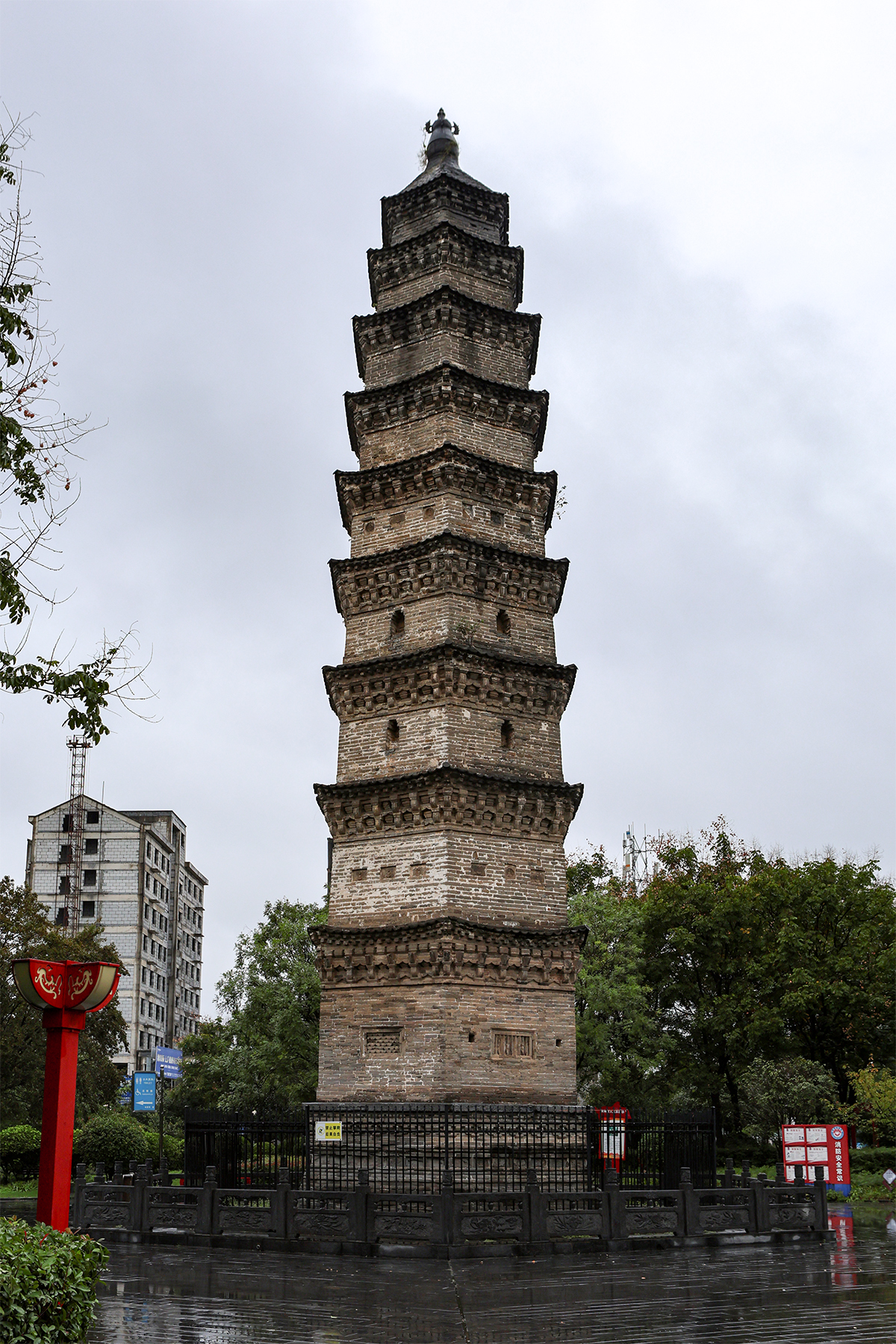
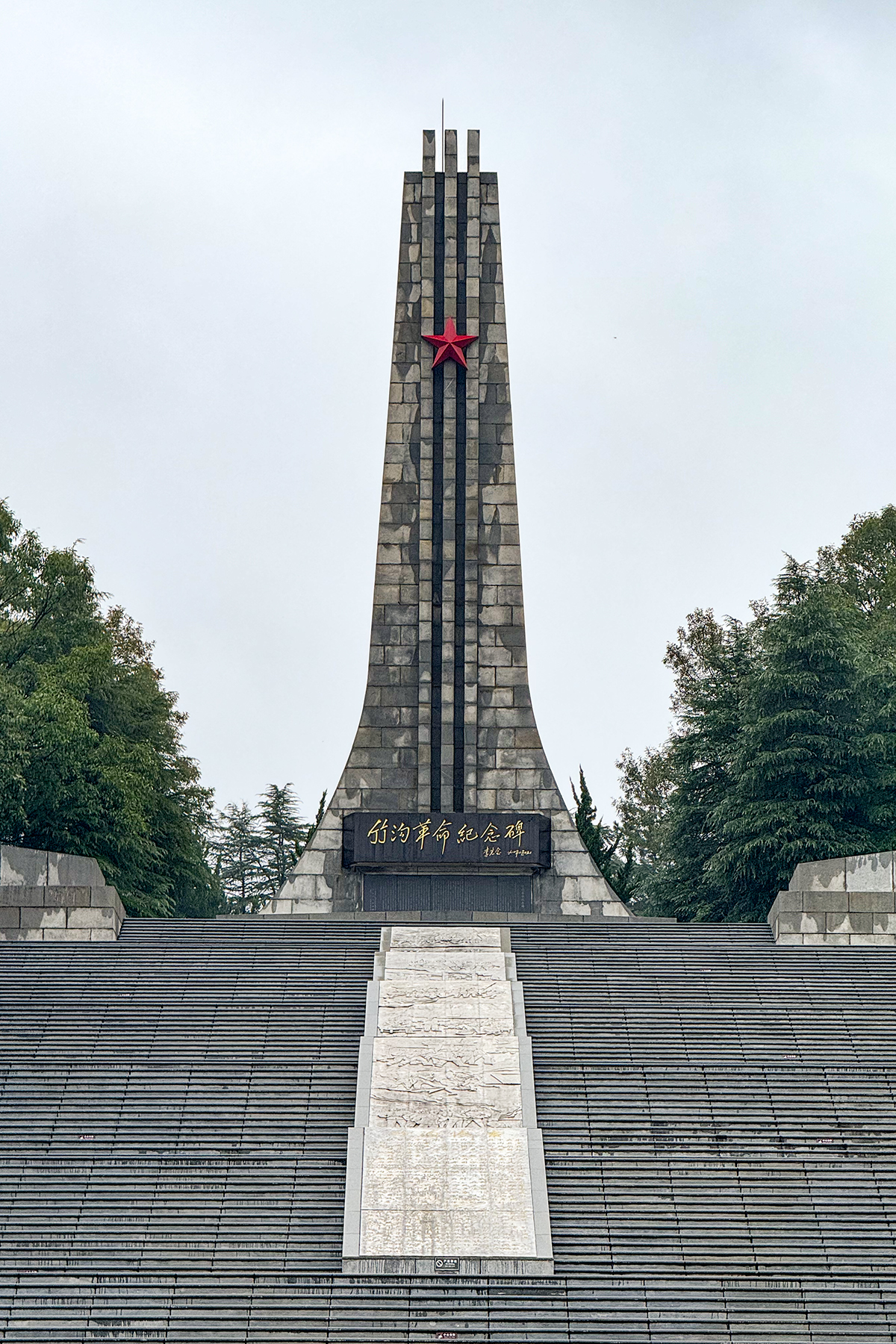
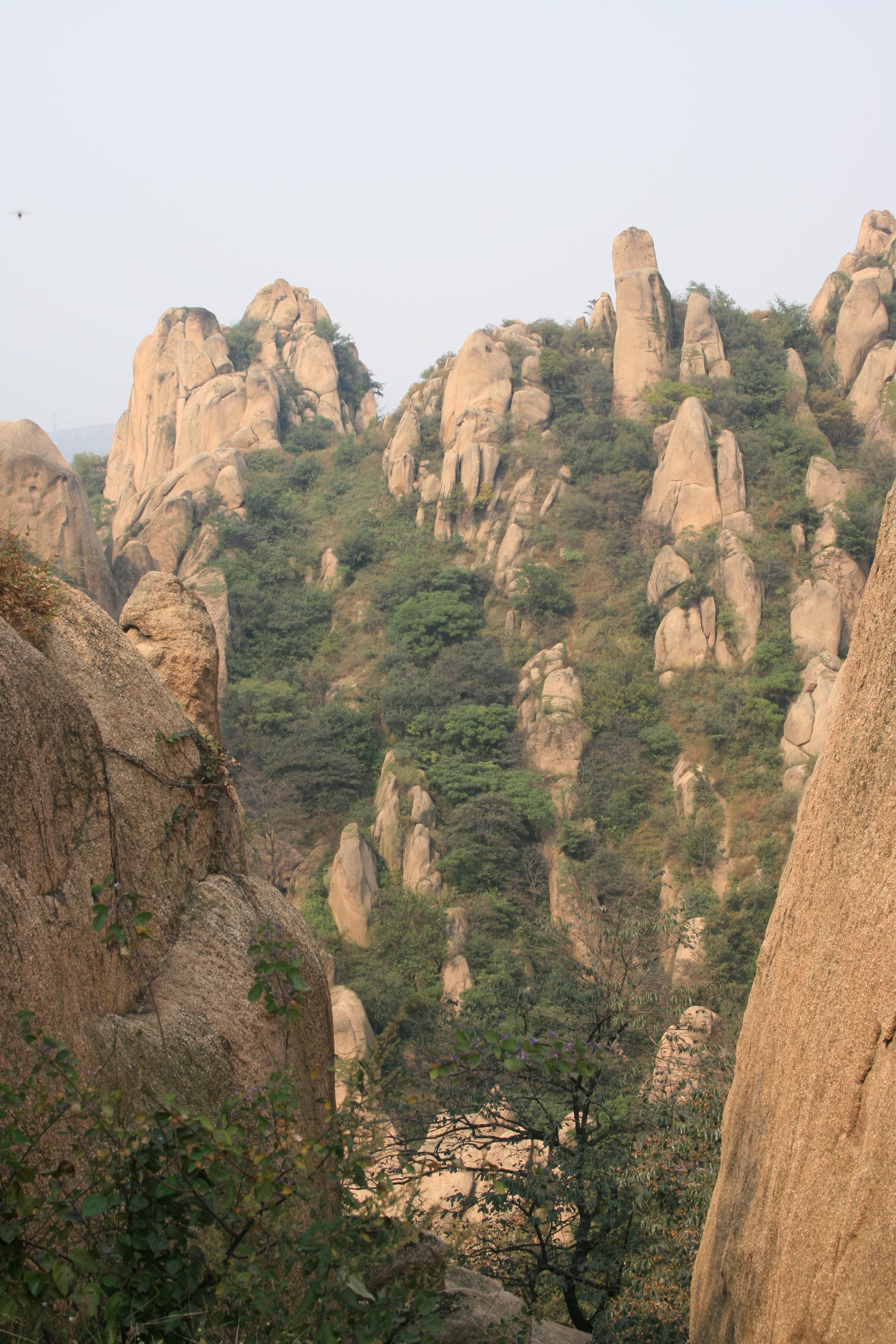
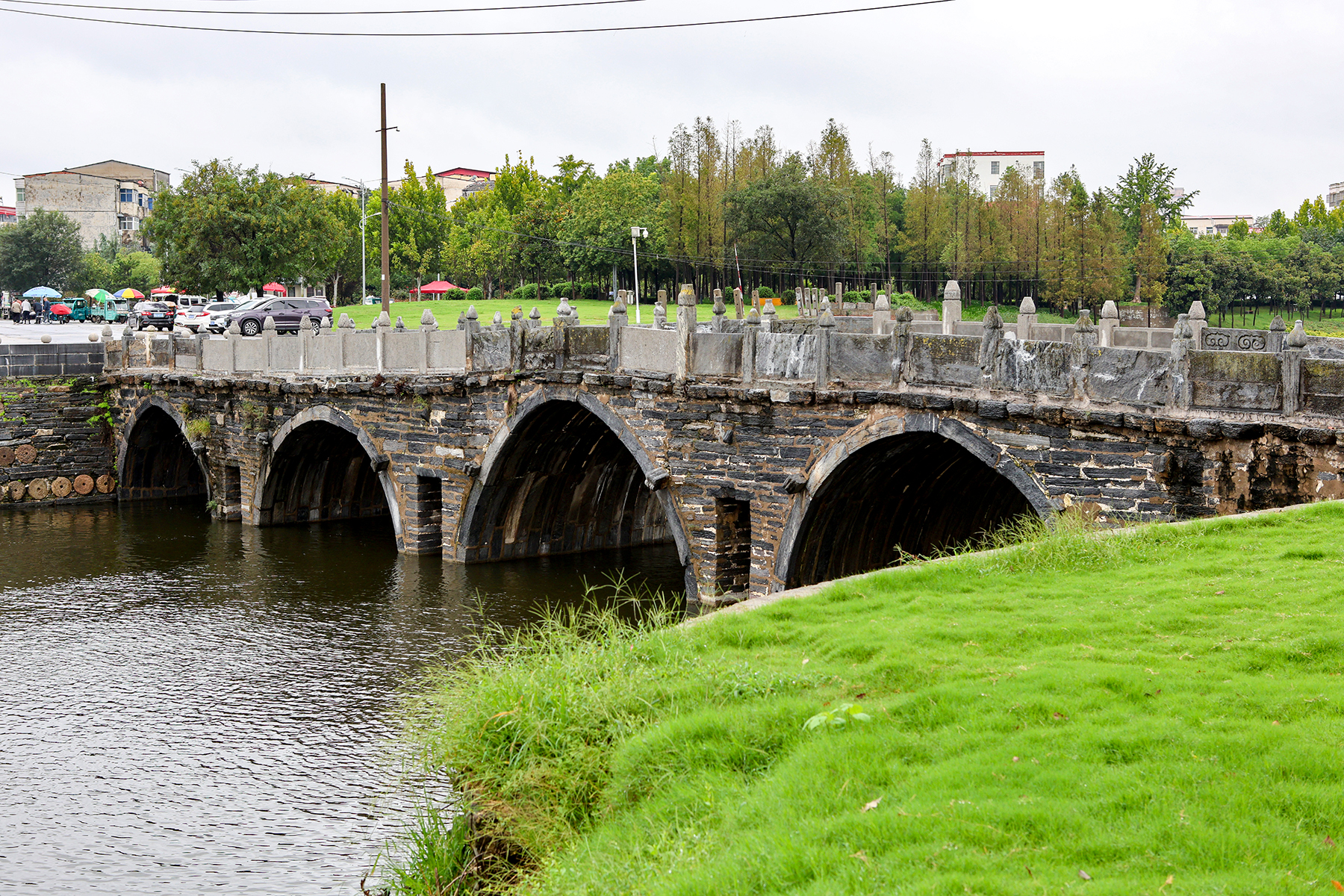
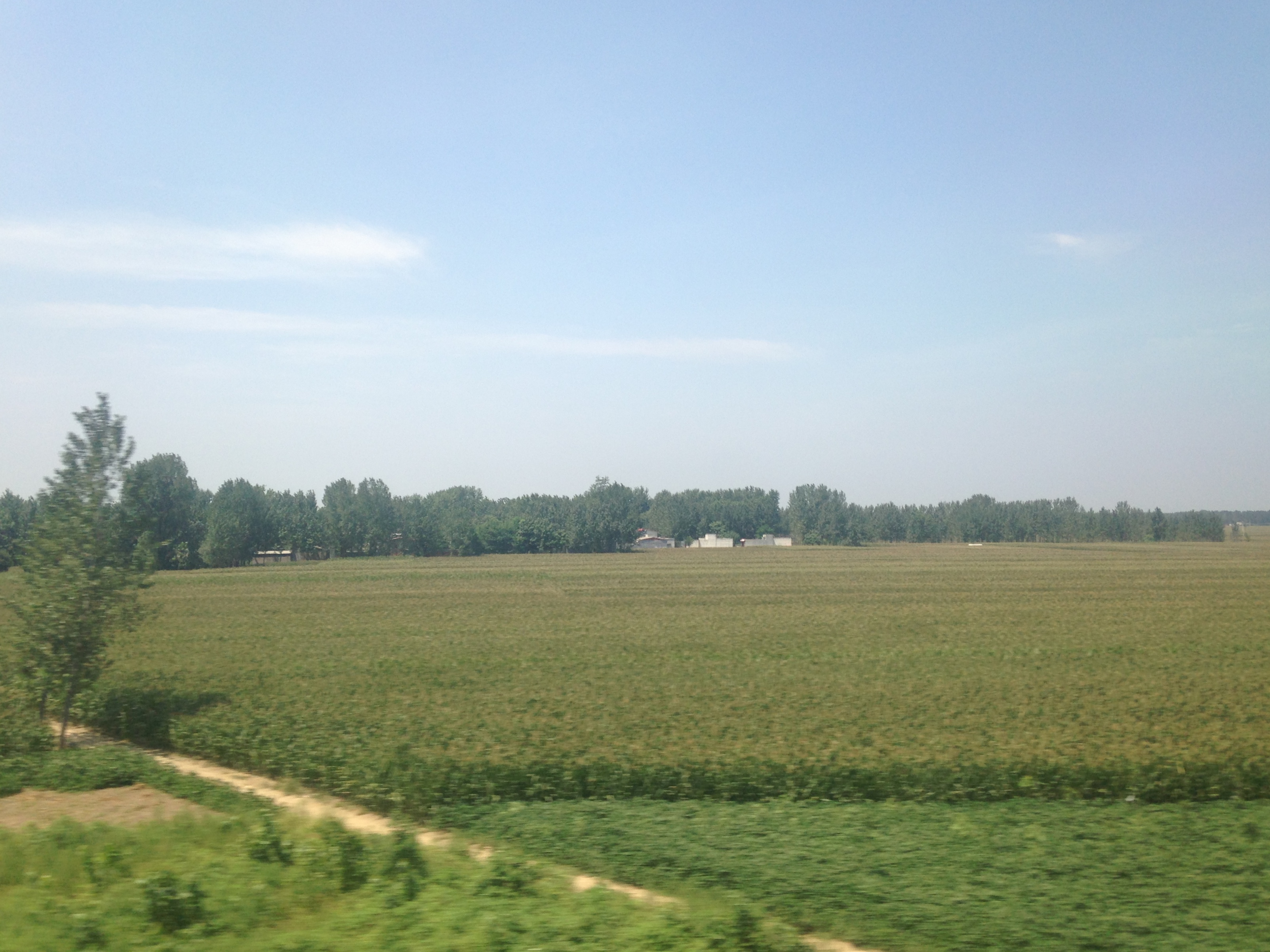
- Runan Old Town Wuying Pagoda Monument of Zhugou Revolution Mount Chaya Jimin Bridge Plain in Xiping

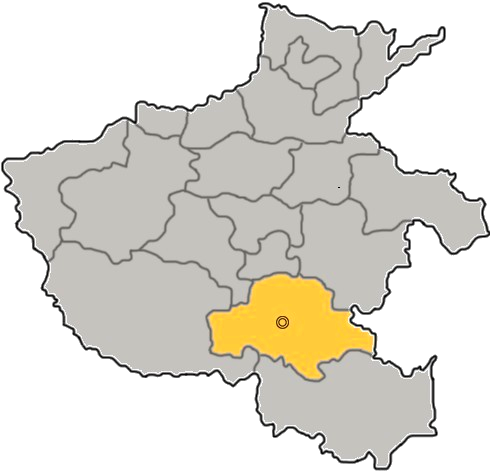
- Zhumadian in Henan

- Location on the North China Plain Zhumadian (China)
- Coordinates (Zhumadian municipal government): 33°00′50″N 114°01′19″E
- Country: People's Republic of China
- Province: Henan
- County-level divisions: 10
- Municipal seat: Yicheng District

Area
  - Prefecture-level city: 15,083 km^{2} (5,824 sq mi)
  - Urban: 778 km^{2} (300 sq mi)
  - Metro: 1,849 km^{2} (714 sq mi)

Population (2020 census)
  - Prefecture-level city: 7,008,427
  - Density: 464.66/km^{2} (1,203.5/sq mi)
  - Urban: 1,025,543
  - Urban density: 1,320/km^{2} (3,410/sq mi)
  - Metro: 1,466,913
  - Metro density: 793.4/km^{2} (2,055/sq mi)

GDP
  - Prefecture-level city: CN¥ 197.3 billion US$ 29.7 billion
  - Per capita: CN¥ 28,305; US$ 4,261
- Time zone: UTC+8 (China Standard)
- Postal code: 463000
- Area code: 0396
- ISO 3166 code: CN-HA-17
- Major Nationalities: Han
- License plate prefixes: 豫Q
- Website: zhumadian.gov.cn

Zhumadian (simplified Chinese: 驻马店; traditional Chinese: 駐馬店; pinyin: Zhùmǎdiàn; postal: Chumatien) is a prefecture-level city in southern Henan province, China. It borders Xinyang to the south, Nanyang to the west, Pingdingshan to the northwest, Luohe to the north, Zhoukou to the northeast, and the province of Anhui to the east.

As of the 2020 Chinese census, its total population was 7,008,427 inhabitants whom 1,466,913 lived in the built-up (or metro) area made of Yicheng District and Suiping County now conurbated.

It was once the center of the Cai state during the Eastern Zhou era. The state leaves its name in several of the subdivisions including Shangcai County and Xincai County.

== Administrative divisions ==
The prefecture-level city of Zhumadian administers 1 district and 9 counties.

- Yicheng District (驿城区)
- Runan County (汝南县)
- Pingyu County (平舆县)
- Xincai County (新蔡县)
- Shangcai County (上蔡县)
- Xiping County (西平县)
- Suiping County (遂平县)
- Queshan County (确山县)
- Zhengyang County (正阳县)
- Biyang County (泌阳县)

Map
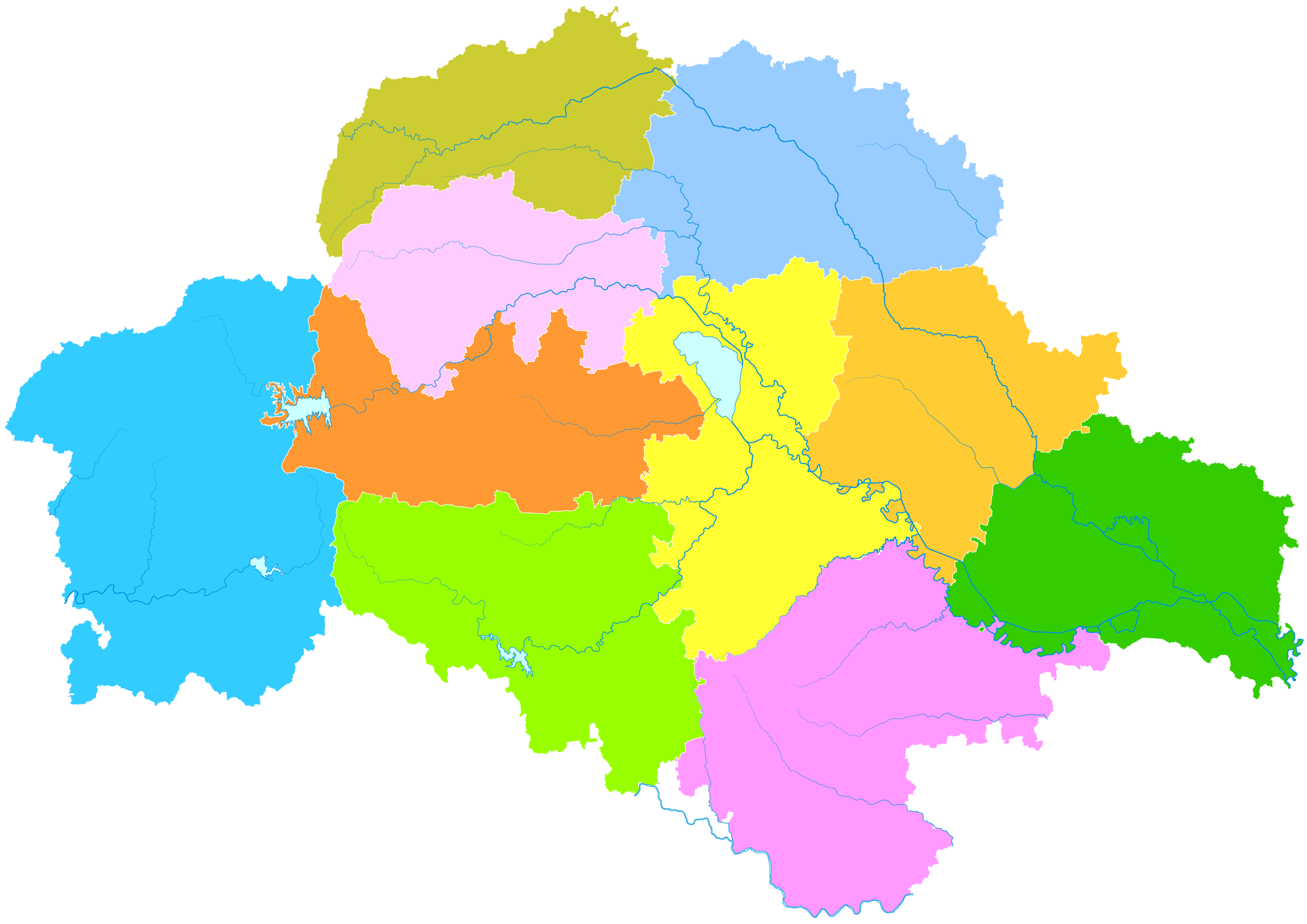

== Geography ==
Zhumadian is situated at 32° 18'−33° 35' N latitude, and 113° 10'−115° 12' E longitude, with a maximum east–west width of 191.5 kilometres (119.0 mi), and at most 137.5 kilometres (85.4 mi) long from south to north. The area of the prefecture is 15,083 square kilometres (5,824 sq mi), occupying 8.9% of the total provincial area. Neighbouring prefectures are:

- Fuyang, Anhui (E)
- Xinyang (S)
- Nanyang (W)
- Pingdingshan (NW)
- Luohe (N)
- Zhoukou (NE)

The terrain is dominated by mountains, hills, hillocks, and plains.

=== Climate ===
Zhumadian has a four-season, monsoon-influenced humid subtropical climate (Köppen Cwa), with cold, somewhat damp, winters, and hot, humid summers. The monthly 24-hour average temperature ranges from 1.5 °C (34.7 °F) in January to 27.3 °C (81.1 °F) in July, while the annual mean is 15.15 °C (59.3 °F). More than 60% of the annual precipitation of 990 mm (39 in) occurs from June to September. With monthly percent possible sunshine ranging from 39% in March to 46% in four months, the city receives 1,927 hours of bright sunshine annually.

Climate data for Zhumadian, elevation 106 m (348 ft), (1991–2020 normals, extremes 1951–present)
Month	Jan	Feb	Mar	Apr	May	Jun	Jul	Aug	Sep	Oct	Nov	Dec	Year
Record high °C (°F)	21.3 (70.3)	25.7 (78.3)	34.2 (93.6)	35.8 (96.4)	37.7 (99.9)	41.0 (105.8)	41.9 (107.4)	41.5 (106.7)	38.8 (101.8)	34.7 (94.5)	30.1 (86.2)	21.7 (71.1)	41.9 (107.4)
Mean daily maximum °C (°F)	6.4 (43.5)	10.1 (50.2)	15.4 (59.7)	22.0 (71.6)	27.3 (81.1)	31.3 (88.3)	32.0 (89.6)	30.8 (87.4)	27.1 (80.8)	22.1 (71.8)	15.0 (59.0)	8.7 (47.7)	20.7 (69.2)
Daily mean °C (°F)	1.7 (35.1)	4.8 (40.6)	10.0 (50.0)	16.2 (61.2)	21.7 (71.1)	26.0 (78.8)	27.5 (81.5)	26.2 (79.2)	21.8 (71.2)	16.6 (61.9)	9.8 (49.6)	3.9 (39.0)	15.5 (59.9)
Mean daily minimum °C (°F)	−2.1 (28.2)	0.6 (33.1)	5.2 (41.4)	10.8 (51.4)	16.4 (61.5)	21.1 (70.0)	23.7 (74.7)	22.6 (72.7)	17.7 (63.9)	12.3 (54.1)	5.7 (42.3)	0.1 (32.2)	11.2 (52.1)
Record low °C (°F)	−18.0 (−0.4)	−18.1 (−0.6)	−10.0 (14.0)	−1.2 (29.8)	4.4 (39.9)	10.7 (51.3)	16.0 (60.8)	13.9 (57.0)	7.1 (44.8)	−1.5 (29.3)	−8.7 (16.3)	−14.8 (5.4)	−18.1 (−0.6)
Average precipitation mm (inches)	24.1 (0.95)	25.7 (1.01)	45.0 (1.77)	54.8 (2.16)	87.9 (3.46)	127.6 (5.02)	202.8 (7.98)	137.7 (5.42)	97.5 (3.84)	60.6 (2.39)	41.0 (1.61)	20.1 (0.79)	924.8 (36.4)
Average precipitation days (≥ 0.1 mm)	5.7	6.7	7.2	7.4	9.6	8.5	12.0	11.2	9.4	7.8	6.8	5.3	97.6
Average snowy days	4.9	3.5	1.2	0	0	0	0	0	0	0	0.9	2.6	13.1
Average relative humidity (%)	67	67	67	67	66	68	79	82	77	70	69	67	71
Mean monthly sunshine hours	116.6	118.9	150.8	176.2	184.0	166.3	165.4	153.1	141.0	140.8	131.8	128.6	1,773.5
Percentage possible sunshine	37	38	40	45	43	39	38	37	38	41	42	42	40
Source: China Meteorological Administration

== Agriculture ==
Mainly wheat, maize, peanut, sesame, green beans and tobacco are grown.

== Culture ==
Zhumadian has a cultural history and is the birthplace of many great people in ancient times. There is an old site of Liang Shanbo and Zhu Yingtai who are the characters in the Butterfly Lovers, a famous Chinese story.

Zhumadian is the location of Mount Chaya, a major geological site of interest and tourist attraction.

People from Henan have been negatively stereotyped, with Zhumadian being singled out as the supposed base of scamming. This may have originated from the aftermath of the 1975 Banqiao Dam collapse, when locals affected by the disaster eventually become the first large batch of migrant workers to go to Guangdong. Most of these workers had little education and lived together in impoverished communities, leading to a negative perception of Zhumadian people. A popular quote going around was:

十亿人民九亿骗，河南人民是教练，总部设在驻马店
A billion people, nine hundred million deceived, the people of Henan are the coaches, their headquarters are in Zhumadian

== Dams ==
Zhumadian has 62 different dams including Banqiao Dam within its territory. The failure of the Banqiao and Shimantan Dams in 1975, which caused more than 150,000 casualties and made more than 10 million people homeless, is considered the biggest catastrophe of its kind.

== Transportation ==
One of the Chinese main highways, China National Highway 107, runs through Zhumadian. Zhumadian also has its own transportation system. The old Golden Decade-built Zhumadian Aerodrome primarily served military operations from 1931 until late-2018, when it was converted for commercial passenger airliner use as well.

== Demographics ==
According to the Seventh National Census in 2020, the city's Permanent Population (hukou) was 7,008,427. The population was 49.57% male and 50.43% female. In terms of age structure, 25.1% were aged from 0 to 14, 55.1% were aged from 15 to 59, 19.8% were over 60, and 15.72% were over 65.

== Education ==
- HuangHuai University (黄淮学院)
- Zhumadian Vocational and Technical College (驻马店职业技术学院)
- Zhumadian Preschool Education College (驻马店幼儿师范高等专科学校)
