= Liu Ye (Tang dynasty) =

Liu Ye (劉鄴) (died January 24, 881?), courtesy name Hanfan (漢藩), was an official of the Chinese Tang dynasty, serving as a chancellor during the reigns of Emperor Yizong and Emperor Yizong's son Emperor Xizong.

== Background ==
It is not known when Liu Ye was born. His family was from Run Prefecture (潤州, in modern Zhenjiang, Jiangsu), and his father Liu Sanfu (劉三復) was a long-time staff member of Li Deyu when Li was a regional governor. Later, when Li became a powerful chancellor during the reign of Emperor Wuzong, Liu served under Li in the imperial government, eventually reaching the post of deputy minister of justice. It was after a petition by Liu Sanfu that Lady Pei, the wife of the deceased military governor Liu Congjian, whose adoptive son (and biological nephew) Liu Zhen rebelled against the imperial government, was put to death, apparently at Li's behest, in 844. It was shortly after Liu Sanfu's petition regarding Lady Pei that he himself died of illness.

As it is not known when Liu Ye was born, it is unknown how old he was when Liu Sanfu died. However, it was immediately stated that Liu Ye was able to recite poems even when he was just five or six years old and that Li took pity on him — implying that that was, in fact, his age at the time of Liu Sanfu's death. Li took him into the household and had him study under the same teachers that Li's own sons were studying under. After Li lost power and was exiled after Emperor Wuzong's death and succession by his uncle Emperor Xuānzong in 846, Liu Ye lost his support, and became a traveling author in the Yangtze River-Qiantang River region, writing to support himself. It was said that his writing ability became well known in the region.

== Early career ==
Later, when the official Gao Shaoyi (高少逸) served as the governor of Shanguo Circuit (陝虢, headquartered in modern Sanmenxia, Henan), he invited Liu Ye to serve as his assistant in his capacity as the military prefect (團練使, Tuanlianshi). He later continued to serve under Gao when Gao was transferred to Zhenguo Circuit (鎮國, headquartered in modern Weinan, Shaanxi). Liu was later recalled to the capital Chang'an to serve as a copyeditor (校書郎, Xiaoshu Lang) at the Palace Library.

== During Emperor Yizong's reign ==
Early in the Xiantong era (860–874) of Emperor Xuānzong's son Emperor Yizong, Liu Ye, at the recommendations of Liu Zhan and Gao Qu, both of whom had known Liu's father Liu Sanfu, recommended Liu Ye to be Zuo Shiyi (左拾遺), a low-level advisory official at the examination bureau of government (門下省, Menxia Sheng). In 860, he submitted a petition to Emperor Yizong discussing Li Deyu's contributions and how, after his exile and death in exile, his household was scattered. As a result, Emperor Yizong restored Li's offices and the title of Duke of Wei posthumously. Later, Liu served as an imperial scholar (翰林學士, Hanlin Xueshi). Eventually, he rose to be Zhongshu Sheren (中書舍人), a mid-level official at the legislative bureau (中書省, Zhongshu Sheng), deputy minister of census (戶部侍郎, Hubu Shilang), and chief imperial scholar (翰林學士承旨, Hanlin Xueshi Chengzhi). It was said that, despite Liu Zhan's previous recommendation of him, that in 870, when Liu Zhan, who was then chancellor, offended Emperor Yizong by begging for mercy on the part of the family members of the physicians who failed to save Emperor Yizong's favorite daughter Princess Tongchang (Emperor Yizong had executed those physicians and arrested their family members), Liu Ye joined Princess Tongchang's husband Wei Baoheng and the chancellor Lu Yan in falsely accusing Liu Zhan, leading to Liu Zhan's exile.

In 871, Liu was given the additional post of director of the salt and iron monopolies. Later in the year, he was made the minister of rites (禮部尚書, Libu Shangshu) and given the designation Tong Zhongshu Menxia Pingzhangshi (同中書門下平章事), making him a chancellor de facto.

== During Emperor Xizong's reign ==
Emperor Yizong died in 873 and was succeeded by his young son Emperor Xizong. In 874, Liu Zhan was recalled to the capital to again serve as chancellor, and it was said that Liu Ye was apprehensive about this development. Later in the year, after Liu Zhan grew ill and died after Liu Ye had invited him to a feast at the directory of salt and iron monopolies, it was commonly suspected that Liu Ye had poisoned Liu Zhan to death.

By this time, though, Xiao Fang and Cui Yanzhao had become the leading chancellors, and neither liked Liu Ye. At their behest, in 874, Liu was sent out of the capital to serve as the military governor (Jiedushi) of Huainan Circuit (淮南, headquartered in modern Yangzhou, Jiangsu). Prior to Liu's departure, when he met with Emperor Xizong to thank for the commission, he read a poem that he had written:

The dew and the rain had no accomplishments, and they are ashamed of acting on Heaven's behalf.

The smoke and the fog lose their way, and they do not know when they can return.

It was said that Emperor Xizong was saddened by the poem. While serving at Huainan, in 876, when Huainan came under the attack of the agrarian rebel Wang Xianzhi, Liu sought aid from the imperial government, and thus Emperor Xizong ordered Xue Neng (薛能) the military governor of Ganhua Circuit (感化, headquartered in modern Xuzhou, Jiangsu) to send several thousand soldiers to aid Liu. Subsequently, Emperor Xizong replaced Liu with the general Gao Pian and recalled him to Chang'an, and then commissioned him as the military governor of Fengxiang Circuit (鳳翔, headquartered in modern Baoji, Shaanxi) and the mayor of its capital Fengxiang Municipality. Liu then resigned due to illness and was made Zuo Pushe (左僕射), one of the heads of the legislative bureau (尚書省, Shangshu Sheng).

In 880, agrarian rebel Huang Chao captured Chang'an and established his own state of Qi as its emperor. Emperor Xizong fled to Chengdu. Liu was unable to follow Emperor Xizong in his flight, and he, as well as the current chancellors Doulu Zhuan and Cui Hang, hid at the house of the imperial guard general Zhang Zhifang, who had publicly submitted to Huang but had secreted a number of Tang officials at his house. When the Qi troops intensified their searches for Tang officials, Liu fled with Doulu and Cui at night, but all three were captured. Huang offered them official posts, but they refused and were executed.

== Notes and references ==
- Old Book of Tang, vol. 177.
- New Book of Tang, vol. 183.
- Zizhi Tongjian, vols. 250, 252, 254.
