= Cui Yanzhao =

Chancellor and Government Official of Chinese Tang Dynasty

Cui Yanzhao (Chinese: 崔彥昭; fl.840s - 876), courtesy name Siwen (思文), was an official of the Chinese Tang dynasty, serving as a chancellor during the reign of Emperor Xizong.

== Background ==
While his birth date remains unknown, Cui Yanzhao hailed from the "Lesser Branch" of the prominent Cui clan of Qinghe (清河, in modern Xingtai, Hebei). His ancestors originally claimed descent from the ruling house of the Spring and Autumn period state Qi. Cui Yanzhao's traceable ancestry included officials of Han dynasty (including Cui Yan), Liu Song, Northern Wei, and Tang dynasty. However, neither his grandfather Cui Zhi (崔秩) nor his father Cui Qi (崔豈) was listed with any official titles. Cui's relationship with his maternal cousin (their mothers were sisters), Wang Ning (王凝), was famously strained. Their enmity began when Wang passed the imperial examinations in the Jinshi class first and grew arrogant. On one occasion before Cui’s own Jinshi success in 849, Wang met him at home while dressed informally—a significant mark of disrespect. Wang further insulted him by suggesting, "Maybe you should take the Mingjing [(明經)] examination instead." Because the Mingjing examination was considered far less prestigious than the Jinshi, this greatly offended Cui. Still, by this point, Cui was already known for his deep understanding of Confucianism. After Cui himself passed the imperial examinations in 849 (during the reign of Emperor Xuānzong), he served on the staffs of several regional governors. He was known for his understanding of the economy as well as his administrative capabilities.

== During Emperor Yizong's reign ==
Early in the Xiantong era (860-874) of Emperor Xuānzong's son and successor Emperor Yizong, Cui Yanzhao became Bingbu Langzhong (兵部員外郎), a low-level official at the ministry of defense (兵部, Bingbu); he was then promoted to be Bingbu Langzhong (兵部郎中), a supervisory official at the ministry of defense, and put in charge of drafting edicts. He was then made Zhongshu Sheren (中書舍人), a mid-level official at the legislative bureau of government (中書省, Zhongshu Sheng), and later deputy minister of census (戶部侍郎) and director of finances.

In 869, Cui was made the military governor (Jiedushi) of Heyang Circuit (河陽, headquartered in modern Jiaozuo, Henan) and the prefect of Heyang's capital Meng Prefecture (孟州). In 871, he was transferred to Hedong Circuit (河東, headquartered in modern Taiyuan, Shanxi), to serve as its military governor and the mayor of its capital Taiyuan Municipality. It was said that at that time, the Shatuo tribesmen of the region did not obey Tang laws, and the circuit was much disturbed. Cui governed the circuit with both grace and might, and within a span of three years, the circuit had become peaceful. According to his biographies in both the Old Book of Tang and the New Book of Tang, when he was initially set to be transferred to another circuit at that point, the senior residents of the circuit submitted a petition requesting that he remain at Hedong, and Emperor Yizong agreed.

== During Emperor Xizong's reign ==
Emperor Yizong died in 873 and was succeeded by his young son Emperor Xizong. At that time, one of the chancellors was Zhao Yin, who passed the Jinshi examination in the same year as Cui Yanzhao, and Zhao recommended Cui as having economic abilities. In 874, Cui was recalled from Hedong to serve as the deputy minister of civil service affairs (吏部侍郎, Libu Shilang) and the director of the salt and iron monopolies. Later in the year, when he was referred to as deputy minister of defense (兵部侍郎, Bingbu Shilang) and director of finances, he was made Zhongshu Shilang (中書侍郎), the deputy head of the legislative bureau, and given the designation Tong Zhongshu Menxia Pingzhangshi (同中書門下平章事), making him a chancellor de facto. As chancellor, Cui assisted his senior colleague Xiao Fang in reforming the chancellors' office (as several recent chancellors, Yang Shou, Lu Yan, and Wei Baoheng, had just recently been exiled and then put to death for their corruption as chancellors).

Despite his high status, Cui, who was considered filially pious, and he attended to his mother daily as if he were a civilian. When he became chancellor, however, his mother, fearful that he would punish his cousin Wang Ning, who was then the deputy minister of defense, commented to her maid servant within Cui's earshot, "Make some new socks and shoes for me. Deputy Minister Wang and his mother will surely be exiled to the wilderness. I will leave with my sister." Cui bowed and wept, stating, "I will never do that." Therefore, Wang was not punished.

In 876, because of illness, Cui was removed from his chancellor position and made a senior advisor to the Crown Prince. He died thereafter, but when he did so is not known.
