= Consort Guo (Yizong) =

Consort Guo, imperial consort rank Shufei (郭淑妃; disappeared 880), was an imperial consort of the Chinese Tang dynasty. She was the favorite concubine of Emperor Yizong (Li Wen/Li Cui) and the mother of his favorite daughter, Princess Tongchang.

== Background ==
It is not known when the future Consort Guo was born. When she was young, she entered the mansion of Li Wen, who was then the Prince of Yun, and became his concubine. At that time, Li Wen, who was the oldest son of then-reigning Emperor Xuānzong, was not favored by Emperor Xuānzong, and he lived with other more distantly-related imperial princes at the princely residences known as the 16 Mansions, while the other sons of Emperor Xuānzong lived inside the palace. Emperor Xuānzong also despised it when people raised the issue that he should create a Crown Prince. Li Wen thus was often fearful of his father's wrath. It was said that Consort Guo tended to him carefully and comforted him.

== As imperial consort ==
Emperor Xuānzong died in 859. Initially, three high-ranking eunuchs that Emperor Xuānzong favored, Wang Guizhang (王歸長), Ma Gongru (馬公儒), and Wang Jufang (王居方), were set to have Li Wen's younger brother, Emperor Xuānzong's favorite son Li Zi (李滋) the Prince of Kui, declared emperor, but another eunuch who opposed them, Wang Zongshi (王宗實), arrested and executed them. Wang Zongshi issued an edict in Emperor Xuānzong's name, creating Li Wen Crown Prince (and changing his name to Li Cui). The next day, Li Cui was declared emperor (as Emperor Yizong).

Emperor Yizong created Consort Guo Shufei (淑妃), the second highest rank for imperial consorts. Her daughter was created the Princess Tongchang, and became Emperor Yizong's favorite daughter. When Princess Tongchang married the official Wei Baoheng in 869, Emperor Yizong spent immense amounts of gold and silver, as well as many other treasures, as her dowry, and also gave her a mansion. Because of Wei's marriage with Princess Tongchang, he was allowed to enter the palace at will and often feasted with Consort Guo, leading to rumors that he was having an affair with Consort Guo.

In 870, Princess Tongchang died. Emperor Yizong was so shocked by her death that he, in anger, killed more than 20 imperial physicians, who were not able to save her. He further imprisoned some 300 relatives of those physicians. When the chancellor Liu Zhan and the mayor of Jingzhao Municipality (京兆, i.e., the region of the capital Chang'an) Wen Zhang (溫璋) tried to speak against these actions, both of them offended Emperor Yizong and were demoted; Wen committed suicide. Princess Tongchang was buried in a grand ceremony with much treasure, such that the servants of the Wei household were gathering up the ashes of the items burned at the funeral in order to screen out the gold and silver in the ashes. Even after the burial, Emperor Yizong and Consort Guo missed her greatly, and they commissioned the musician Li Keji (李可及) to write a musical piece known as the Sigh of a Hundred Years (歎百年曲). Several hundred dancers danced to the music. Immense amounts of jewelry from the imperial storage were used to dress the dancers up, and a large amount of silk was used to cover the ground that they danced on.

In 872, when the deputy principal of the imperial university, Wei Yinyu (韋殷裕), submitted a petition accusing Consort Guo's brother, Guo Jingshu (郭敬述), who was then the administrator of the imperial armory, of various immoralities, Emperor Yizong was so incensed at the accusation that he arrested Wei and put him to death by caning, and further confiscated his household to be servants. Emperor Yizong also exiled many officials accused of being Wei's associates.

== After Emperor Yizong's death ==
In 873, Emperor Yizong died, and Li Yan, his son by the deceased imperial consort, Consort Wang, became emperor (as Emperor Xizong). Subsequently, Wei Baoheng, who was a chancellor by that point, was accused of various improprieties. Wei was exiled and subsequently ordered to commit suicide. However, Consort Guo appeared to escape reprisals and remained in the palace.

In 880, the Tang realm was in upheaval over various rebellions, when the strongest of those rebels, Huang Chao, captured Chang'an, forcing Emperor Xizong to flee. Consort Guo was unable to accompany Emperor Xizong in flight. It was said that after this, her whereabouts became unknown, and it was not known what happened to her.

== Notes and references ==
- New Book of Tang, vol. 77.
- Zizhi Tongjian, vols. 251, 252.
