= Zheng Tian =

Chinese politician

Zheng Tian (traditional Chinese: 鄭畋; simplified Chinese: 郑畋; pinyin: Zhèng Tián, 821?/825?–883?), courtesy name Taiwen (臺文), formally Duke Wenzhao of Xingyang (滎陽文昭公), was a Chinese politician and military commander of the late Tang dynasty who served twice as a chancellor under Emperor Xizong, from 874 to 878 and again from 881 to 883, and played a crucial role in the dynasty's resistance to the cataclysmic Huang Chao Rebellion. Zheng was also an accomplished man of letters, and his qijue poem "On Mawei Slope" was included in the Qing-era anthology Three Hundred Tang Poems.

The son of a prominent political figure, Zheng enjoyed early success in the imperial examinations and entered public service at a young age. After his father's political faction fell from favor, he was blacklisted for years and only returned to office in the 860s, after forming an association with the respected statesman Liu Zhan. Zheng secured influential court postings during Liu's brief tenure as chancellor, earning a reputation as a talented edict drafter and military strategist. He remained loyal to Liu when the latter fell from power and was in turn banished from court, but was rehabilitated during the reign of Emperor Xizong and made a chancellor in 874. Although Zheng enjoyed the young emperor's respect, he was marginalized at court by his cousin and fellow chancellor Lu Xie and, following a dispute with Lu, was removed from the chancellorship in 878. Zheng was later appointed as military governor of Fengxiang Circuit, west of the imperial capital of Chang'an. In 881, when Huang Chao's rebel army forced Emperor Xizong to flee to Chengdu, Zheng remained resolutely loyal to the dynasty and was tasked by the emperor with rallying loyalist resistance in the capital region. Relying on his personal wealth, he organized a viable fighting force at Fengxiang Circuit and inflicted a surprise defeat on rebel forces sent to subdue him. Zheng subsequently participated in an unsuccessful military operation to retake the capital and, following a mutiny, rejoined the emperor in Chengdu and was made a chancellor once again. He was forced into retirement in 883, following disputes with the influential court eunuch Tian Lingzi, and died of illness shortly thereafter.

== Background and early career ==
Assuming that Zheng Tian died in 883, he might have been born in either 821 or 825. He was a part of the prominent Zheng clan based in Xingyang (滎陽, in modern Zhengzhou, Henan), but his traceable ancestry only went as far back as his great-grandfather Zheng Shaolin (鄭少鄰), who served as a civil service official under the prefect of Zheng Prefecture (鄭州, in modern Zhengzhou). Zheng Shaolin, as well as Zheng Tian's grandfather Zheng Mu (鄭穆) and Zheng Tian's father Zheng Ya (鄭亞), all passed the imperial examinations in the Jinshi class, and while Zheng Mu served only as a county magistrate, Zheng Ya became well known for his abilities, and he became a close associate of the chancellor Li Deyu, who was particularly powerful during the reign of Emperor Wuzong, eventually serving as a high level imperial consultant. Other than Zheng Tian, Zheng Ya had at least two younger sons, Zheng Jun (鄭畯) and Zheng Pi (鄭毗).

Zheng Tian himself passed the imperial examinations in the Jinshi class when he was 17, and thereafter served as a staff member under the military governor (Jiedushi) of Xuanwu Circuit (宣武, headquartered in modern Kaifeng, Henan). When he was 21, he further passed a special examination for those who made good rulings, and he was made the sheriff of Weinan County (渭南, in modern Weinan, Shaanxi) and a historian who would edit imperial histories. Before he could serve in those positions, however, in 847, due to his association with Li Deyu, who had lost power during the reign of the then-reigning Emperor Xuānzong (Emperor Wuzong's uncle), Zheng Ya was demoted to be prefect of Gui Prefecture (桂州, in modern Guilin, Guangxi), and Zheng Tian followed his father to Gui Prefecture, where Zheng Ya would die, probably around 849. (This chronology appeared to make it more likely that Zheng Tian was born in 825 or later, as he would have been 22 in 851 if born in 825, whereas he would already be 26 if born in 821.) As, during Emperor Xuānzong's reign, the court scene was dominated by the chancellor Bai Minzhong and then Linghu Tao, both of whom had no liking for Li Deyu and ejected Li Deyu's associates, Zheng Tian was not given an imperial government office for a long time.

== During Emperor Yizong's reign ==
During the Xiantong era (860–874) of Emperor Xuānzong's son Emperor Yizong, after Linghu Tao had left the office of the chancellors, Liu Zhan, who was then the military governor of Hedong Circuit (河東, headquartered in modern Taiyuan, Shanxi), invited Zheng Tian to serve on his staff. Subsequently, Zheng Tian was recalled to the capital Chang'an to serve as Yubu Yuanwailang (虞部員外郎), a low-level official at the ministry of public works (工部, Gongbu). However, at that time, Zheng Xun (鄭薰), one of the secretaries general of the executive bureau of government (尚書省, Shangshu Sheng), which the ministry of public works belonged to, was a follower of Linghu's, and he prevented Zheng Tian from actually taking office by making false accusations against Zheng Tian, and Zheng Tian left Chang'an again to serve on a governor staff (possibly under Liu). Not until 864 was Zheng Tian again recalled to Chang'an to serve as Xingbu Yuanwailang (刑部員外郎), a low-level official at the ministry of justice (刑部, Xingbu).

After Liu became chancellor in 869, Liu recommended Zheng Tian, and Zheng became an imperial scholar (翰林學士, Hanlin Xueshi) as well as Hubu Langzhong (戶部郎中), a supervisory official at the ministry of census (戶部, Hubu). He was soon also put in charge of drafting edicts, and also made Zhongshu Sheren (中書舍人), a mid-level official at the legislative bureau (中書省, Zhongshu Sheng). During the imperial armies' campaign against the rebel Pang Xun, who occupied Xu Prefecture (徐州, in modern Xuzhou, Jiangsu) in 869, Zheng was largely in drafting the numerous edicts involved in the military maneuvers, and it was said that his colleagues admired him for the speed and the elegance with which he wrote. He was soon promoted to be both deputy minister of census (戶部侍郎, Hubu Shilang) and, after Pang's rebellion was suppressed, chief imperial scholar (翰林學士承旨, Hanlin Xueshi Chengzhi).

In 870, after the death of Emperor Yizong's favorite daughter Princess Tongchang (同昌公主), Emperor Yizong, in grief, executed the imperial physicians who were unable to save her and further arrested some 300 of their family members. Liu tried to intercede on their behalf and drew Emperor Yizong's anger. With the chancellor Lu Yan and Princess Tongchang's husband Wei Baoheng making false accusations against Liu, Liu was exiled. When Zheng was ordered to draft the edict announcing Liu's exile, he used language that outwardly rebuked Liu but instead praised Liu. Lu thus had Zheng exiled and demoted to be the prefect of Wu Prefecture (梧州, in modern Wuzhou, Guangxi).

== During Emperor Xizong's reign ==
=== Before and during first term as chancellor ===
After Emperor Yizong died in 873 and was succeeded by his young son Emperor Xizong, Zheng Tian was gradually moved closer to the capital—first to Chen Prefecture (郴州, in modern Chenzhou, Hunan) and then to Jiang Prefecture (絳州, in modern Yuncheng, Shanxi). He was then recalled to Chang'an to serve as You Sanqi Changshi (右散騎常侍), a high-level advisor at the legislative bureau.

In 874, by which time he had become the deputy minister of civil service affairs (吏部侍郎, Libu Shilang), he was again made chief imperial scholar and given the designation Tong Zhongshu Menxia Pingzhangshi (同中書門下平章事), making him a chancellor de facto. At that time, typically, the armies posted to the southern circuits (i.e., Lingnan East Circuit (嶺南東道, headquartered in modern Guangzhou, Guangdong), Lingnan West Circuit (嶺南西道, headquartered in modern Nanning, Guangxi), and Jinghai Circuit (靜海, headquartered in modern Hanoi, Vietnam)) were supplied with food supplies from five circuits to the north, and the supplies had to be shipped by sea ships, which were frequently wrecked at great loss of life and resources. At Zheng's suggestion, the imperial control over the salt and iron monopolies in the region was transferred to Wei He (韋荷) the military governor of Lingnan East, who was authorized to boil water to produce salt for sale, and then use the proceeds to buy food supplies from the prefectures in the southern parts of Jiangxi Circuit (江西, headquartered in modern Nanchang, Jiangxi). It was said that it was after this that the food supplies for the armies posted to the southern regions became fuller. Thereafter, the general Wang Shifu (王師甫), who served as Wei's deputy in Wei's role as the commander of the Lingnan East army, requested to be made the commander of the Lingnan East army and offered the imperial treasury a large amount of tax supplies. Zheng pointed out the absurdity—that Wang was proposing to replace Wei despite Wei's contributions by offering money. As a result, Wang was removed from his office. Thereafter, Zheng was created the Marquess of Xingyang.

By 876, the central/southern Tang realm was being overrun with agrarian rebellions, the chief of which was led by Wang Xianzhi. Zheng's suggestions regarding how to react to the rebellion were largely ignored. As a result, he offered to resign, but Emperor Xizong did not accept his resignation. In 877, a dispute erupted between Zheng and his chancellor colleagues Wang Duo and Lu Xi—as Wang Duo and Lu wanted to put the general Zhang Zimian (張自勉) under the command of Song Wei (宋威), who oversaw the operations against Wang Xianzhi, but Zheng, believing that, because of a pre-existing rivalry between Zhang and Song, that Song would find an excuse to have Zhang killed if Zhang came under Song's command, refused to endorse the petition that Wang Duo and Lu drafted. The dispute became so great that Wang Duo and Lu offered to resign, and Zheng offered to retire. Emperor Xizong did not approve any of these resignations. (The disagreement between Zheng and Lu was despite the fact that they were cousins, as their mothers were sisters to each other, both daughters of the official Li Ao (李翱).)

In 878, Zheng and Lu had another major dispute—over whether a Tang princess should be sent to Dali to marry Dali's emperor Longshun (隆舜) to end the war between the two states, as proposed by the general Gao Pian. Lu supported the marriage proposal, while Zheng opposed. As they argued, the dispute became so vehement that Lu threw an inkstone onto the ground, breaking it. When Emperor Xizong heard about this, he commented, "When the great officials curse each other like this, how can they govern the other officials?" As a result, both Zheng and Lu were removed from their chancellor posts and given the entirely honorary titles as advisors to the Crown Prince (there being no crown prince at the time), and they were both further sent to the eastern capital Luoyang. They were replaced with Doulu Zhuan and Cui Hang.

=== Between first and second terms as chancellor ===
Shortly after Zheng Tian's demotion, however, he was recalled to Chang'an to serve as the minister of civil service affairs (吏部尚書, Libu Shangshu). The next year, he became the military governor of Fengxiang Circuit (鳳翔, headquartered in modern Baoji, Shaanxi). While at Fengxiang, he conscripted 500 elite soldiers, and it was said that it was because of these soldiers that the banditry in the circuit subsided.

In 880, the agrarian rebel leader Huang Chao attacked and captured Chang'an. Emperor Xizong fled toward Chengdu. On the way, as he was going through Luo Valley (駱谷, in modern Xi'an, Shaanxi), Zheng intercepted him and begged him not to leave Chang'an's vicinity, requesting that he go to Fengxiang instead. However, Emperor Xizong, apprehensive of further attacks from Huang, refused, and told Zheng that he would entrust Zheng with the responsibilities of defending against further attacks by Huang. At Zheng's request, Emperor Xizong further authorized him to carry out actions without first seeking imperial approval.

Meanwhile, though, when Zheng returned to Fengxiang, the Fengxiang army was fearful of an attack by Huang, and thus there were murmurs that Zheng should submit to Huang. Huang, who had declared himself the emperor of a new state of Qi, further sent emissaries to Fengxiang to declare a general pardon (i.e., to pardon Zheng and the Fengxiang forces for resisting him). Zheng refused to meet with Huang's emissaries, and instead entered a pledge with the soldiers to defend Tang. At that time, many of the imperial guard soldiers could not catch up with Emperor Xizong on his flight to Chengdu, and Zheng summoned them to Fengxiang to have them join his army, spending his own personal wealth to placate them. When Huang further sent his general Wang Hui (王暉) to Fengxiang to try to persuade Zheng to submit, Zheng had Wang beheaded. Thereafter, Emperor Xizong bestowed the Tong Zhongshu Menxia Pingzhangshi title on Zheng again, as an honorary title, and made him the overall commander of Tang forces in the Chang'an region.

In spring 881, Huang had his generals Shang Rang and Wang Bo (王播) launch a major attack on Fengxiang. As the Qi army viewed Zheng as a civilian who did not know about military matters, they took few precautions. Zheng counterattacked with his ally Tang Hongfu (唐弘夫), and they dealt the Qi forces a major defeat at Longwei Slope (龍尾陂, in modern Baoji). Zheng subsequently issued a declaration calling for the armies of the entire empire to attack Qi. It was said that it was only because of Zheng's declaration that the people of the empire found out that Emperor Xizong was still alive.

In summer 881, with Zheng, Tang Hongfu, Cheng Zongchu (程宗楚), Wang Chongrong, Wang Chucun, and Tuoba Sigong converging on Chang'an, Huang abandoned it. However, after Tang forces entered Chang'an, they began pillaging the capital, such that they became bogged down. Qi forces then counterattacked, killing Cheng and Tang Hongfu, and dealing the other Tang forces major losses. Tang forces were forced to again abandon Chang'an, allowing Qi forces to retake it.

As the campaign waged on, the Fengxiang storage became depleted. In winter 881, the Fengxiang officer Li Changyan, who was then stationed at Xingping (興平, in modern Xianyang, Shaanxi), provoked the soldiers and led them to return to Fengxiang in order to attack Zheng. Zheng, not wanting to see a battle between Tang soldiers, surrendered the city to Li Changyan, and fled south toward Chengdu as well. Once he reached Feng Prefecture (鳳州, in modern Baoji), he submitted a report to Emperor Xizong explaining what had occurred and offering to resign. Emperor Xizong made Li Changyan the military governor of Fengxiang, while making Zheng an advisor to the Crown Prince, with his office at Luoyang.

=== Second term as chancellor and aftermaths ===
In spring 882, Emperor Xizong summoned Zheng to Chengdu, making him chancellor again, along with the titles of Sikong (司空, one of the Three Excellencies) and Menxia Shilang (門下侍郎, deputy head of the examination bureau (門下省, Menxia Sheng)), giving him the most key responsibilities over the military matters. It was said that despite the imperial government's exile status, Zheng insisted on proper adherence to regulations—such that, by 883, by which time Huang had again abandoned Chang'an and Emperor Xizong was preparing to return to Chang'an, Zheng had offended the powerful eunuch Tian Lingzi and Tian's brother Chen Jingxuan, the military governor of Xichuan Circuit (西川, headquartered in modern Chengdu), as he rebuffed Tian Lingzi's request to have his assistant Wu Yuan (吳圓) promoted and Chen's desire to receive greater honors than chancellors. Tian Lingzi and Chen thus instigated Li Changyan into submitting a petition that stated, "The soldiers are apprehensive. Therefore, when Your Imperial Majesty goes through Fengxiang, Zheng Tian should not follow." Zheng thus submitted his resignation. He was thus removed from his chancellor post and made a senior advisor to the Crown Prince. His son Zheng Ningji (鄭凝積) was made the prefect of Peng Prefecture (彭州, in modern Chengdu), and Zheng was sent to Peng Prefecture to recuperate from an illness that he was apparently having at the time. He died soon thereafter.

== Sources ==
=== Primary sources ===
- Old Book of Tang, vol. 178.
- New Book of Tang, vol. 185.
- Zizhi Tongjian, vols. 252, 253, 254, 255.
