= Zhang Zhifang =

Chinese general (died c. 881)

- Traditional Chinese: 張直方
- Simplified Chinese: 张直方
Transcriptions
Standard Mandarin
- Hanyu Pinyin: Zhāng Zhífāng
- Wade–Giles: Chang Chih-fang

Zhang Zhifang (died January 23, 881?) (Note: The chronology in the Zizhi Tongjian implied, but did not state outright, that Zhang Zhifang was executed by Huang Chao's Qi state on the same day as many other Tang officials, so the January 23 date may not be exact.) was a Chinese military general of the late Tang dynasty. Succeeding his father Zhang Zhongwu, he briefly ruled Lulong (盧龍) around modern Beijing as its military governor (jiedushi) in de facto independence from the imperial government, but fearing a mutiny, he fled to the imperial capital Chang'an and thereafter served as an imperial general. During Huang Chao's rebellion against Emperor Xizong, Zhang surrendered to Huang Chao's Qi state but plotted to undermine it; when this was discovered, Qi executed him.

== Background ==
It is not known when Zhang Zhifang was born. He was a son of Zhang Zhongwu, who had seized Lulong from Zhang Jiang (張絳) in 841 with the approval of Emperor Wuzong but without actual support from imperial troops. Zhang Zhongwu thereafter ruled Lulong in de facto independence from the imperial government, but followed Emperor Wuzong's orders during Emperor Wuzong's campaigns against the Uyghur Khanate remnants and the warlord Liu Zhen, and therefore enjoyed a strong relationship with the imperial government. At some point, Zhang Zhifang became the commander of Zhang Zhongwu's guard troops. Zhang Zhongwu died in 849, during the reign of Emperor Wuzong's successor and uncle Emperor Xuanzong. The soldiers supported Zhang Zhifang to succeed him, and therefore, Emperor Xuanzong initially made him the acting military governor and then military governor.

== As military governor ==
However, Zhang Zhifang almost immediately alienated the Lulong soldiers by being cruel and devoted to hunts and games. In winter 849, the soldiers were developing a plot to overthrow him. Zhang Zhifang found out about the plot and, in fear, claimed that he was undertaking a hunt. Instead, he took his family and fled to the imperial capital Chang'an. The soldiers instead supported Zhou Lin as the acting military governor.

== As imperial general ==
When Zhang Zhifang arrived at Chang'an, Emperor Xuanzong sent messengers to welcome him, and made him a general of the imperial guards. As Zhang had a large family with him, Emperor Xuanzong awarded the salary of an honorary minister of public works (工部尚書, Gongbu Shangshu). Sometime thereafter, his salary level was increased to that of an honorary You Pushe (右僕射). However, he continued to be violent and cruel in his disposition. On one occasion, when he killed an imperial guard messenger by caning due to a minor fault that should not have been punished with death, he was reduced in title from Jinwu Dajiangjun (金吾大將軍) to Yulin Tongjun (羽林統軍). He continued to hunt repeatedly, and therefore neglected his duties serving in the rotation of imperial guard commanders. As a result, in 851, he was further reduced in title to Xiaowei Jiangjun (驍衛將軍). He continued to be violent, and he often killed household servants due to minor faults. In 852, he was demoted to be the census officer at En Prefecture (恩州, in modern Jiangmen, Guangdong).

A long time thereafter, Zhang was recalled to again serve as Yulin Tongjun. However, thereafter, he was accused of allowing his subordinates to commit banditry, and he was demoted to be the military advisor to the prefect of Kang Prefecture (康州, in modern Zhaoqing, Guangdong). Later, he was allowed to settle at the eastern capital Luoyang, where he was again well known for his hunting. During the Qianfu era (874-879) of Emperor Xuanzong's grandson Emperor Xizong, Zhang was recalled to Chang'an to serve as Xiaowei Dajiangjun (驍衛大將軍). Because the office did not carry a large salary, the chancellor Zheng Tian spoke on his behalf, pointing out Zhang Zhongwu's contributions during Emperor Wuzong's reign and that the Zhang household was effectively living in poverty. Emperor Xizong therefore made Zhang Zhifang an honorary You Pushe and also returned him to the title of Jinwu Dajiangjun.

== Surrender to Qi and death ==
Late in 880, the army under the rebel Huang Chao was approaching Chang'an. Emperor Xizong fled to Chengdu. Zhang Zhifang led a group of Tang officials and generals to Bashang (霸上, in modern Xi'an, Shaanxi) to welcome Huang. Huang thereafter proclaimed a new Qi state as its emperor. Even though Zhang accepted a position in the Qi administration, however, he hid many Tang officials who were unable to follow Emperor Xizong in flight within the walls of his home, including the former chancellor Liu Ye and the chancellors Doulu Zhuan and Cui Hang. Further, he was plotting a surprise attack on Huang, hoping to restore Emperor Xizong. When this was discovered, he was executed, along with his family.
