= Doulu Zhuan =

Doulu Zhuan (豆盧瑑) (died January 24, 881), courtesy name Xizhen (希真), was an official of the Chinese Tang dynasty, serving as a chancellor during the reign of Emperor Xizong. When the agrarian rebel Huang Chao captured the Tang capital Chang'an, Doulu was unable to flee; he was then executed by Huang's new state of Qi.

== Background ==
It is not known when Doulu Zhuan was born. His family was, according to the Old Book of Tang, from the Hedong (河東) region — i.e., modern Shanxi — but, according to the New Book of Tang, from Henan Municipality (河南) — i.e., the region of the Tang dynasty eastern capital Luoyang. All that was recorded about his ancestry was that his grandfather Doulu Yuan (豆盧願) and father Doulu Ji (豆盧籍) passed the imperial examinations in the Jinshi class, as the table of the chancellors' family trees in the New Book of Tang did not include his family, as it only listed, among the Doulus, the earlier chancellor Doulu Qinwang, and did not indicate that there was any relations between Doulu Qinwang and Doulu Zhuan.

== Career prior to chancellorship ==
Doulu Zhuan passed the imperial examinations in the Jinshi class himself in 859, during the reign of Emperor Xuānzong. Little was said in his biographies about his subsequent career, however, until the end of the Xiantong era (860-874) of Emperor Xuānzong's son and successor Emperor Yizong, when he became Bingbu Yuanwailang (兵部員外郎), a low-level official at the ministry of defense (兵部, Bingbu). He thereafter served as Hubu Langzhong (戶部郎中), a supervisory official at the ministry of census (戶部, Hubu), and was put in charge of drafting edicts. He thereafter was made an imperial scholar (翰林學士, Hanlin Xueshi) and Zhongshu Sheren (中書舍人), a mid-level official at the legislative bureau of government (中書省, Zhongshu Sheng). During the Qianfu era (874-879) of Emperor Yizong's son and successor Emperor Xizong, he was made deputy minister of census (戶部侍郎, Hubu Shilang) and chief imperial scholar (翰林學士承旨, Hanlin Xueshi Chengzhi).

== Chancellorship ==
In 878, when Emperor Xizong decided to remove the chancellors Zheng Tian and Lu Xi over a violent argument that Zheng and Lu had with each other, both Doulu Zhuan and Cui Hang were made chancellors to succeed Zheng and Lu, with the designation Tong Zhongshu Menxia Pingzhangshi (同中書門下平章事). After Lu was restored to the chancellorship in 879, though, Lu was clearly the leader among the chancellors, and Doulu was described as simply following Lu's lead on policies. Further, when Cui would have policy suggestions, Doulu often stopped him from presenting them.

By this point, Tang was facing the increasing threat of the agrarian rebel Huang Chao. By late 880, Huang had crossed Huai River from the south and was heading toward Luoyang and Chang'an. Prior to Huang's doing so, Doulu had suggested agreeing to an offer Huang had made — that he be given the military governorship (Jiedushi) of his home territory, Tianping Circuit (天平, headquartered in modern Tai'an, Shandong) — and then, once Huang went to Tianping to take over the circuit, attack him there. Lu opposed this proposal, however, believing that the Tang forces at Huai River would be sufficient to stop Huang's advance, and Emperor Xizong agreed with Lu. Instead, though, Tang forces were repeatedly defeated by Huang, who then captured Luoyang.

Doulu and Cui suggested sending forces to defend Tong Pass to stop Huang's advance toward Chang'an, but both of them were also suggesting that the contingency plan made by the powerful eunuch Tian Lingzi — that Emperor Xizong flee to the Sanchuan region (三川, i.e., modern Sichuan, Chongqing, and southern Shaanxi) be implemented. After Huang captured Tong Pass and approached Chang'an, Emperor Xizong fled toward Xichuan Circuit (西川, headquartered in modern Chengdu, Sichuan), where Tian's brother Chen Jingxuan was military governor. Doulu and Cui, for reasons unknown, were unable to follow Emperor Xizong's flight, and they, along with the former chancellor Liu Ye, hid at the mansion of the general Zhang Zhifang, who had outwardly submitted to Huang (who declared himself the emperor of a new state of Qi) upon Huang's entry into Chang'an but was hiding many Tang officials at his mansion. As Qi forces sought to find hiding Tang officials, however, Liu, Doulu, and Cui tried to flee, but were captured. Refusing to submit to Huang, they were executed. Doulu Zhuan's nephew Doulu Ge later served as a chancellor during the succeeding Later Tang.

== Notes and references ==
- Old Book of Tang, vol. 177.
- New Book of Tang, vol. 183.
- Zizhi Tongjian, vols. 253, 254.
