= Kang Chengxun =

- Traditional Chinese: 康承訓
- Simplified Chinese: 康承训
Transcriptions
Standard Mandarin
- Hanyu Pinyin: Kāng Chéngxùn
- Wade–Giles: K'ang Ch'êng-hsün

Courtesy name Kang Jingci
- Traditional Chinese: 康敬辭
- Simplified Chinese: 康敬辞
Transcriptions
Standard Mandarin
- Hanyu Pinyin: Kāng Jìngcí
- Wade–Giles: K'ang Ching-tz'u

Title Duke of Fufeng
- Traditional Chinese: 扶風公
- Simplified Chinese: 扶风公
- Literal meaning: Elder of Fufeng
Transcriptions
Standard Mandarin
- Hanyu Pinyin: Fúfēng Gōng
- Wade–Giles: Fu-fêng Kung

Kang Chengxun (c. 808 – c. 873), (Note: Kang Chengxun's biography in the New Book of Tang indicates that he died at the age of 65 and implies—though it does not clearly state—that his death occurred shortly after the 873 death of Emperor Yizong.) courtesy name Jingci, title the Duke of Fufeng, was a Chinese general of the Tang Empire. He is most well known for his failures against incursions from the Nanzhao Kingdom of Dali and his successes against the rebel Pang Xun, accomplished with the assistance of the Shatuo chieftain Zhuye Chixin.

== Life ==
=== Early years ===
Kang Chengxun was born under the Tang dynasty, possibly in 808. His grandfather was the general Kang Rizhi (康日知), who served under Emperor Dezong and bore the title of Prince of Kuaiji (會稽王). His father was Kang Zhimu (康志睦), who also served as an imperial general and bore the title of Duke of Kuaiji (會稽公). Kang Chengxun himself became a general in the imperial guards.

During the reign of Emperor Dezong's great-great-grandson Emperor Xuanzong (r. 846–859), he was made the commander of the northern border base of Tiande (天德) in modern Bayan Nur, Inner Mongolia. It was said that the army at Tiande lacked horses at the time and therefore was repeatedly suffering defeats at the hands of the northern nomads. Kang reduced the budgets in areas that he felt were unnecessary in order to bolster the number of horses the base could afford. After he did so, the Tiande garrison had more success. Dangxiang tribesmen had previously captured the nearby bases of Shediao (射雕) and Luoyuan (洛源) and taken captives but, when they heard of Kang's strengthening of his force, they did not dare to attack Tiande and returned their captives to him. Kang was thus given an honorary ministerial title, created the Baron of Kuaiji (會稽男), and soon thereafter made military governor (jiedushi) of Yiwu around modern Baoding, Hebei.

=== Nanzhao campaign ===
In 863, a major Nanzhao attack captured Annan in northern Vietnam. The Tang protector general Cai Xi (蔡襲) was killed in the fighting. Nanzhao forces then approached Yongzhou (邕州, modern Nanning, Guangxi), the capital of the West Lingnan Circuit (嶺南西道). The military governor of West Lingnan was the civilian Zheng Yu (鄭愚), who was fearful of the Nanzhao forces and submitted a petition to be replaced by a general. Emperor Xuanzong having died, his son Emperor Yizong recalled Kang to the Tang capital Chang'an, intending to have him replace Zheng. Kang was permitted to bring several hundred Yiwu officers and soldiers with him. Upon Kang's arrival in Chang'an, Emperor Yizong commissioned him as military governor of West Lingnan and also mobilized about 10,000 soldiers from Jingnan (荊南) around modern Jingzhou, Hubei; from East Shannan (山南東道) around modern Xiangfan, Hubei; from Eyue (鄂岳) around modern Wuhan, Hubei; and from Jiangxi (江西) around modern Nanchang, Jiangxi, to accompany him.

After Kang arrived at Yongzhou, the Nanzhao attacks intensified, so Emperor Yizong further mobilized troops from eight other areas—Zhongwu (忠武) around modern Xuchang, Henan; Yicheng (義成) around modern Anyang, Henan; Pinglu (平盧) around modern Weifang, Shandong; Xuanwu (宣武) around modern Kaifeng, Henan; Yanhai (兗海) around modern Jining, Shandong; Tianping (天平) around modern Tai'an, Shandong; Xuanshe (宣歙) around modern Xuancheng, Anhui; and Zhenhai (鎮海) around modern Zhenjiang, Jiangsu—to reinforce him. Kang, however, did not set up a proper scouting system. As Nanzhao's forces approached Yongzhou, Kang sent his troops to engage them using local Liao (獠) tribesmen as guides. The Liao led the Tang army into a Nanzhao ambush, annihilating most of them. Only the men from Tianping, who were late by one day, escaped the ambush. Afterward, Kang was incapacitated by fear, and the defense of Yongzhou was actually undertaken by his deputy Li Xingsu (李行素).

The Nanzhao forces arrived just as Li finished his preparations and Yongzhou was besieged for four days, nearly falling. A number of officers suggested counterattacking, but Kang initially refused, relenting only after repeated pleas from a low-level officer from Tianping. At night, that Tianping officer took 300 volunteers and made a surprise attack on the Nanzhao camp, setting it on fire and killing some 500 men. In shock, Nanzhao withdrew. Only then did Kang launch his main force to try to chase down the invaders, but was unable to. They killed only some 300 Liao who had been forced to cooperate with the Nanzhao army. Kang's report nonetheless claimed a great victory. Emperor Yizong, in response, bestowed on Kang the honorific title of acting director of the right (右僕射). However, there was great resentment that all of the soldiers who were rewarded based on Kang's report were Kang's relatives or soldiers close to him, while the soldiers who had participated in the vital surprise raid were not awarded. Subsequently, the military governor of neighboring East Lingnan Circuit (嶺南東道) headquartered in modern Guangzhou, Guangdong, found out what had actually happened and reported it to the chancellors. Kang was already fearful that his deception would be discovered and offered to resign his post, feigning an illness. He was recalled to serve as a general of the imperial guard with his office at the eastern capital Luoyang.

=== Pang Xun's revolt ===
In 868, soldiers from Xusi (徐泗) around modern Xuzhou, Jiangsu, who had been sent to the West Lingnan Circuit to defend against a potential Nanzhao attack became incensed when they were ordered to stay another year at the border. They mutinied and headed toward Xusi's capital Xuzhou under the leadership of the officer Pang Xun. After defeating troops sent by the governor (觀察使, guanchashi) Cui Yanzeng (崔彥曾), Pang captured Xuzhou and arrested Cui. He demanded official imperial sanction for the takeover of Xusi, threatening to attack the imperial capital Chang'an if Emperor Yizong refused. Emperor Yizong reacted by commissioning Kang Chengxun as the military governor of Yicheng and the overall commander of an operation against Pang, while commissioning fellow imperial guard generals Wang Yanquan (王晏權) and Dai Keshi (戴可師) as the commanders of the northern and southern wings, respectively. Kang requested that his troops be supplemented with tribesmen under the Shatuo chief Zhuye Chixin as well as men from the Tuyuhun, Tatar, and Qibi (契苾) tribes, and his request was approved. As part of Kang's commission, Emperor Yizong also created him Duke of Fufeng.

In the winter of 868, Kang arrived at Xinxing (新興) in modern Bozhou, Anhui. He had only a little more than 10,000 men, and Pang's subordinate Yao Zhou (姚周), who was at nearby Liuzi (柳子) in modern Suzhou, Anhui. When Yao challenged him, he withdrew his men to Songzhou (宋州) in modern Shangqiu, Henan. Meanwhile, the rebels continued to expand their territory, largely unchecked. By the spring of 869, however, Kang had gathered over 70,000 soldiers and stationed his army just west of Liuzi. Many of the rebels began to become fearful. One who was not—Wang Hongli (王弘立)—attacked Kang and Zhuye only to be defeated. From that point on, rebels who did not wholeheartedly support the uprising started surrendering immediately upon engaging the imperial army. Kang attacked and captured Liuzi, forcing Yao to flee. Yao was subsequently killed by another rebel commander, Liang Pi (梁丕).

Yao's death shocked and dismayed Pang, who—at the suggestion of his strategist Zhou Chong (周重)—tried to show resolve by officially declaring independence from the imperial government. He killed Cui and his top staff members; cut off the limbs of Li Xiang (李湘), an officer from Huainan (淮南) around modern Yangzhou, Jiangsu, and of Guo Houben (郭厚本), a eunuch monitor; and delivered the amputated arms and legs to Kang's army to strike terror into the Tang soldiers. Pang also launched a surprise attack on Weibo (魏博) north of Xuzhou around modern Handan, Hebei, and then turned west to be ready to engage Kang. He ordered the rebels to converge on Kang's army, but his initiative was lost when captured Huainan soldiers were able to flee to Kang and share the planned date of the rebel attack. Kang crushed the rebels who arrived before Pang did and then, when he did engage Pang, Pang's own forces collapsed in fear. Kang captured a number of cities that had fallen under rebel control and then headed to Suzhou in modern Anhui, then under the command of Pang's followers Zhang Ru (張儒) and Zhang Shi (張實). Kang launched an initial siege on Suzhou but could not capture it quickly. He then, however, persuaded the rebel officer Zhang Xuanren (張玄稔), who had not joined the rebellion willingly, into killing Zhang Ru and Zhang Shi and surrendering the city. Zhang Xuanren then suggested to Kang that he pretend to still be leading a rebel army and use trickery—pretending that Suzhou had fallen and that he was fleeing—to capture the nearby rebel base of Fuli (苻離) as well. The plan was approve and succeeded, allowing the imperial forces to capture Fuli easily.

Zhang Xuanren tried to use the same trick to capture Xuzhou, then commanded by Pang Xun's father Pang Juzhi (龐舉直) and his ally Xu Ji (許佶). (Pang Xun himself had left the city to try to launch a surprise attack on Songzhou—now Shangqiu, Henan—and Bozhou in modern Anhui.) Pang Juzhi and Xu Ji realized what Zhang was up to and tried to defend against his attack, but Zhang was able to persuade the people of the town to abandon the rebels in droves and Xuzhou quickly fell. Meanwhile, Kang chased Pang Xun, and Pang, after failing to quickly capture Songzhou, headed for Bozhou. Kang intercepted him there, and, in a final battle in which the Shatuo soldiers led the charge, crushed the remaining rebels. Pang was killed in battle, and the rebellion was over.

=== Later years ===
To reward Kang Chengxun for his contributions, Emperor Yizong commissioned him as the military governor of Hedong (河東) around modern Taiyuan, Shanxi, and gave him the honorary chancellor title of Tong Zhongshu Menxia Pingzhangshi (同中書門下平章事). In 870, however, the chancellors Lu Yan and the emperor's son-in-law Wei Baoheng submitted accusations that Kang had been too hesitant against Pang Xun, had failed to wipe out all of the rebels, and had been too anxious to seize the spoils of war for himself. Kang was then demoted to be the teacher of Emperor Yizong's son Li Ji (李佶), the Prince of Shu, with his office in Luoyang. Soon thereafter, he was further demoted to be the military advisor to the prefect of En (恩州), based in modern Jiangmen, Guangdong.

In 873, Emperor Yizong died. His son Emperor Xizong recalled Kang to again serve as a general of the imperial guards, but Kang apparently died soon thereafter.
