= Cao Que =

Chinese Tang dynasty official

Cao Que (曹確), courtesy name Gangzhong (剛中), was an official of the Chinese Tang dynasty, serving as a chancellor during the reign of Emperor Yizong.

== Background ==
It is not known when Cao Que was born. His family was from the Tang dynasty eastern capital Luoyang. His traceable ancestry went back only to his grandfather Cao Zhou (曹周), and neither Cao Zhou nor his father Cao Jingbo (曹景伯) was listed with any offices, although Cao Jingbo was said to have passed the imperial examinations in the Jinshi class in 803, during the reign of Emperor Dezong. Cao Que had at least one younger brother, Cao Fen (曹汾), who would also eventually serve in the imperial government.

== Early career ==
Cao Que himself passed the imperial examinations in the Jinshi class in 837, during the reign of Emperor Dezong's great-great-grandson Emperor Wenzong, and subsequently served on the staffs of several regional governors. He was later recalled to the capital Chang'an to serve as an imperial censor with the title Shi Yushi (侍御史), and later, he was given the office of Gongbu Yuanwailang (工部員外郎), a low-level official at the minister of public works (工部, Gongbu), and put in charge of drafting edicts. He was promoted to the supervisory position of Gongbu Langzhong (工部郎中), and also made an imperial scholar (翰林學士, Hanlin Xueshi). He was later made Zhongshu Sheren (中書舍人), a mid-level official at the legislative bureau of government (中書省, Zhongshu Sheng). He went on to serve as the acting mayor of Henan Municipality (河南, i.e., the Luoyang region), before being recalled serving as the deputy minister of defense (兵部侍郎, Bingbu Shilang).

== Chancellorship ==
In 863, by which time Cao Que was, in addition to being deputy minister of defense, the director of finances, then-reigning Emperor Yizong (Emperor Wenzong's cousin) gave him the designation Tong Zhongshu Menxia Pingzhangshi (同中書門下平章事), making him a chancellor de facto. It was said that Cao was well-learned in Confucian regulations, was cautious, and followed the laws. In 867, when Emperor Yizong made his favorite musician Li Keji (李可及) a general of the imperial guards, Cao pointed out that such a title was inappropriate for a musician, but Emperor Yizong did not listen to him.

== After chancellorship ==
Cao Que served as chancellor until 870, when he was sent out of Chang'an to serve as the military governor (Jiedushi) of Zhenhai Circuit (鎮海, headquartered in modern Zhenjiang, Jiangsu), continuing to carry the Tong Zhongshu Menxia Pingzhangshi title as an honorary title. He later served as the military governor of Hezhong Circuit (河中, headquartered in modern Yuncheng, Shanxi) and died while at Hezhong, but it is not known when that occurred.

== Son ==
- Cao Xifu (曹希甫), courtesy name Songchen (嵩臣)

== Notes and references ==
- Old Book of Tang, vol. 177.
- New Book of Tang, vol. 181.
- Zizhi Tongjian, vols. 250, 252.
