= Li Guochang =

Tang Dynasty warlord

Li Guochang/Zhuye Chixin 李國昌/朱邪赤心
- Spouse: Lady Qin, Empress Wenjing
- Issue: Li Keyong; Li Keyang; Li Kegong; Li Kening; Princess Yiling
Posthumous name
- Emperor Wenjing 文景皇帝
Temple name
- Xianzu 獻祖
- Father: Zhuye Zhiyi

Li Guochang (Chinese: 李國昌; pinyin: Lǐ Guóchāng) (died 887), né Zhuye Chixin (朱邪赤心), courtesy name Dexing (德興), posthumously honored by the Later Tang dynasty as Emperor Wenjing (文景皇帝) with the temple name of Xianzu (獻祖), was a Chinese general of Shatuo ethnicity during the waning years of the Tang dynasty.

== Background ==
Zhuxie Chixin's ancestors had been hereditary chiefs of the Shatuo tribe, and, after they had come under the rule of Tubo and settled at the formerly-Tang dynasty-controlled Gan Prefecture (甘州, in modern Zhangye, Gansu), had often served as forward troops for Tufan. In or shortly before 808, after Tufan lost nearby Liang Prefecture (涼州, in modern Wuwei, Gansu) to Tang's ally the Uyghur Empire, Tufan feared that the Shatuo would join forces with the Uyghurs, and therefore consider relocating the Shatuo to the Yellow River region. When Zhuxie Chixin's grandfather Zhuxie Jinzhong (朱邪盡忠) heard this, he and his son, Zhuxie Chixin's father Zhuxie Zhiyi (朱邪執宜) decided to take their tribe and flee to Tang. The Tufan gave chase, and in the ensuing engagements, Zhuxie Jinzhong was killed in battle, and over half of the Shatuo were killed or captured. Zhuxie Zhiyi was able to make it through to Tang's Ling Prefecture (靈州, in modern Yinchuan, Ningxia), where the Tang military governor (Jiedushi) of Shuofang Circuit (朔方, headquartered at Ling Prefecture), Fan Xichao (范希朝), welcomed the Shatuo under Zhuxie Zhiyi. They were soon joined by Zhuxie Jinzhong's younger brother Zhuxie Abo (朱邪阿波). In 809, when Fan was transferred from Shuofang to Hedong Circuit (河東, headquartered in modern Taiyuan, Shanxi), the Tang imperial government feared that the Shatuo would betray Tang, and therefore had them relocate, with Fan, to Hedong Circuit, and the area of Huanghuadui (黃花堆, in modern Shuozhou, Shanxi) became Zhuxie Zhiyi's possession.

It is not known when Zhuxie Chixin was born, or when Zhuxie Zhiyi died. It is known that when Zhuxie Zhiyi died, Zhuxie Chixin took over leadership of the Shatuo. In 839, when the Uyghur general Jueluowu (掘羅勿) rose against the rule of then-reigning Zhangxin Khan, he elicited the help from Zhuxie Chixin by giving Zhuxie 300 horses, and together, they defeated the Zhangxin Khan, who then committed suicide, precipitating the subsequent collapse of the Uyghur khanate. In the next few years, when displaced Uyghurs often raided Tang borders, the Shatuo participated extensively in counterattacking them with other tribes loyal to Tang. In 843, Zhuxie Chixin, under the command of the officer Shi Xiong, participated in a raid against the Uyghurs that rescued Tang's Princess Taihe, an aunt of then-reigning Emperor Wuzong, who had been married to a former khan as part of the heqin system of marriage alliances.

In 847, shortly after Emperor Wuzong's death and succession by his uncle Emperor Xuānzong, the Tufan general Lun Kongre (論恐熱), who was then contending for control of Tufan, itself then in internal turmoil, attacked the Ordos region with Dangxiang and Uyghur remnants. Emperor Xuānzong ordered then-military governor of Hedong, Wang Zai, to react, and Wang had Zhuxie serve as his forward commander. The Hedong forces subsequently defeated Lun, who then withdrew.

== During Pang Xun's rebellion ==
In 868, during the reign of Emperor Xuānzong's son Emperor Yizong, soldiers from Xusi Circuit (徐泗, headquartered in modern Xuzhou, Jiangsu) who had been sent to Lingnan West Circuit (嶺南西道, headquartered in modern Nanning, Guangxi) to defend against a potential Dali attack were incensed when they were informed that they were to stay another year at the border, mutinied. They headed toward Xusi's capital Xu Prefecture, under the leadership of the officer Pang Xun. After defeating troops sent by the governor (觀察使, Guanchashi) Cui Yanzeng (崔彥曾), Pang captured Xu Prefecture and put Cui under arrest. He demanded official imperial sanction in taking over Xusi, threatening to attack the imperial capital Chang'an if Emperor Yizong refused. Emperor Yizong reacted by commissioning the imperial guard general Kang Chengxun as the military governor of Yicheng Circuit (義成, headquartered in modern Anyang, Henan) and the overall commander of the operation against Pang. Kang requested his troops to be supplemented with Zhuxie Chixin's troops, as well as the chieftains of Tuyuhun, Tatar, and Qibi (契苾) tribes, and his request was approved.

As Kang's imperial army took shape in 869 and prepared to engage Pang, he had Zhuxie serve as his forward commander, and it was said that the soldiers under Kang, who were from 10 different circuits, were all impressed by the Shatuo soldiers' fortitude. He subsequently contributed greatly to Kang's battles against Pang, including the final battle at Bo Prefecture (亳州, in modern Bozhou, Anhui), in which Pang was killed. To reward Zhuxie, Emperor Yizong gave him the imperial surname of Li and a new personal name of Guochang (國昌, meaning "prosperity to the empire"), having him adopted into the branch house of the Prince of Zheng. He carved out a new Datong Circuit (大同) from Hedong, with its headquarters at Yun Prefecture (雲州, in modern Datong, Shanxi), to have Li Guochang serve as its military governor, but then kept Li Guochang at the capital Chang'an for some time to serve as an imperial guard general.

== Between Pang Xun's and Li Keyong's rebellions ==
In 870, Emperor Yizong commissioned Li Guochang as the military governor of Zhenwu Circuit (振武, headquartered in modern Hohhot, Inner Mongolia). However, he soon incurred the wrath of the imperial government when he, acting in defiance of the imperial government, killed members of his staff without imperial approval. In 872, Emperor Yizong tried to transfer him to Datong Circuit, with the lesser title of Fangyushi (防禦使). Li Guochang claimed to be ill and refused to report to Datong. He was apparently thereafter allowed to remain at Zhenwu, and subsequently sent soldiers to participate in the imperial campaign against the agrarian rebel Wang Xianzhi.

== Rebellion against Tang ==
As of 878, by which time Emperor Yizong's young son Emperor Xizong was emperor, Li Guochang's oldest son Li Keyong was serving as the deputy commander of Shatuo soldiers at Datong Circuit, stationed at Wei Prefecture (蔚州, in modern Zhangjiakou, Hebei). At that time, most of the empire was overrun with agrarian rebellions; the Shatuo officer Li Jinzhong (李盡忠), technically Li Keyong's superior as the commander of the Shatuo soldiers at Datong, as well as his subordinates Kang Junli, Xue Zhiqin (薛志勤), Cheng Huaixin (程懷信), and Li Cunzhang, also considered rising in rebellion, particularly because the defender of Datong Circuit, Duan Wenchu (段文楚), was harsh to the soldiers, and was cutting back on their supplies. Li Jinzhong persuaded Li Keyong to agree to the rebellion, and then attacked and arrested Duan. Li Keyong subsequently arrived at Yun Prefecture and took control of the Datong headquarters, putting Duan and several of Duan's staff members to death cruelly.

Li Guochang initially pledged continued faith to the imperial government, asking it to appoint a new defender of Datong and offering to attack Li Keyong himself if Li Keyong refused to comply. Emperor Xizong thus commissioned Lu Jianfang (盧簡方) as the new defender of Datong and asked Li Guochang to write a letter to persuade Li Keyong to accept Lu—but then decided to make Lu the military governor of Zhenwu and transfer Li Guochang to Datong instead (as military governor), believing that Li Keyong would not dare to resist his father. However, Li Guochang actually hoped for an arrangement where both he and Li Keyong would be each allowed to keep control of a circuit, and therefore, when he received the edict, he, in anger, tore the edict and killed the eunuch monitor of the army. He then joined forces with Li Keyong in raiding the other circuits of the region. Emperor Xizong thereafter commissioned Cui Jikang (崔季康) as the military governor of Hedong to oversee the operations against Li Guochang and Li Keyong, while ordering Li Keju the military governor of Lulong Circuit (盧龍, headquartered in modern Beijing), Li Jun (李均) the military governor of Zhaoyi Circuit (昭義, headquartered in modern Changzhi, Shanxi), as well as the Tuyuhun chiefs Helian Duo and Bai Yicheng (白義誠), and the Sage (薩葛) chief Mi Haiwan (米海萬) to join in the attack as well.

Li Keyong and Li Guochang initially gained successes in their raids on the neighboring circuits, and the Hedong soldiers were repeatedly intimidated into disturbances themselves, causing the successive expulsions or deaths of several Hedong military governors. However, after Li Zhuo (李涿) eventually took over the command of the entire operations, the tide began to turn against the Shatuo. In summer 880, Li Keyong's officer Gao Wenji (高文集), who was then defending Shuo Prefecture (朔州, in modern Shuozhou) for Li Keyong, surrendered to Li Zhuo along with Li Guochang's cousin Li Youjin (李友金) and several other chieftains. Li Keyong reacted by attacking Gao, to try to recapture Shuo Prefecture. Li Keju, however, attacked and defeated Li Keyong at Yao'er Heights (藥兒嶺, in modern Chengde, Hebei) before Li Keyong could do so, killing Li Jinzhong and Cheng. Li Keju then again defeated Li Keyong at Xiongwu Base (雄武軍, in modern Chengde). Meanwhile, Li Zhuo and Helian attacked Wei Prefecture, where Li Guochang had stationed himself at the time, defeating Li Guochang. Li Guochang, Li Keyong, and their family were forced to flee to the Dada (達靼) tribe, then in the Yin Mountains region.

Several months later, Helian, who was consequently made the defender of Datong, secretly tried to persuade the Dada to slaughter the Shatuo who fled to them. Li Keyong, hearing rumors of this, demonstrated his shooting skills at a feast with Dada nobles, and further proclaimed that he did not intend to stay with the Dada and wished to eventually assist the Tang imperial government in attacking the agrarian rebel Huang Chao. After Li Keyong made that proclamation, the Dada became convinced that he would not stay and pose a threat to them, and therefore did not slaughter the Shatuo. Thereafter, Li Guochang and Li Keyong remained with the Dada for some time.

== Exile and later resubmission to Tang ==
In 881, by which time Huang Chao had captured Chang'an, forced Emperor Xizong to flee, and established his own state of Qi as its emperor, Li Youjin persuaded the eunuch monitor of his army, Chen Jingsi (陳景思), to suggest to Emperor Xizong to pardon Li Guochang and Li Keyong and to summon them to aid the imperial cause. Chen agreed, and subsequently, Li Keyong tried to take his troops south. Then-military governor of Hedong, Zheng Congdang, however, refused to supply his troops. In reaction, Li Keyong pillaged the prefectures of Hedong, and Zheng expelled his forces, which were forced to withdraw back north. He captured Xin (忻州, in modern Xinzhou, Shanxi) and Dai (代州, in modern Xinzhou) Prefectures. In 882, Li Guochang, who was then still with the Dada, took his family and settled at Dai Prefecture.

Later in the year, Emperor Xizong again summoned Li Keyong to aid in the imperial cause in attacking Huang Chao's Qi state, and this time, pursuant to imperial orders, Zheng did not again intercept Li Keyong. Li Keyong subsequently became the leading general in the Tang campaign to recapture Chang'an. In 883, Emperor Xizong made Li Keyong the military governor of Hedong and Li Guochang the military governor of a newly created Daibei Circuit (代北), with its headquarters at Dai Prefecture.

== Posthumous honors ==
According to the Zizhi Tongjian, Li Guochang died in 887, while still serving as the military governor of Daibei. According to the annotations to the History of the Five Dynasties, he was given posthumous honors. After his grandson Li Cunxu established the Later Tang in 923 as its Emperor Zhuangzong, Li Guochang was posthumously honored Emperor Wenjing, with the temple name of Xianzu.

== Personal information ==
- Father
  - Zhuxie Zhiyi (朱邪執宜), posthumously honoured as Emperor Zhaolie with the temple name of Yizu 923
- Mother
  - née Cui, posthumously honored Empress Zhaolie 923
- Wife
  - née Qin, posthumously honored Empress Wenjing 923
- Children
  - Li Keyong (856-908), Prince of Longxi 884, Prince of Jin 895, posthumously honoured as Emperor Wu with the temple name of Taizu 923
  - Li Kerang (李克讓) (died 880?), commander in the imperial guard, killed fighting against Huang Chao
  - Li Kegong (李克恭) (died 890), military governor of the Zhaoyi Circuit 890, killed in mutiny
  - Li Kening (李克寧) (died 908), governor of the Zhenwu command, executed by Li Cunxu

== Notes and references ==
- Ouyang Xiu (2004). Historical records of the five dynasties. trans. by Richard L. Davis. New York: Columbia University Press. ISBN 0-231-12826-6.
- New Book of Tang, vol. 218.
- History of the Five Dynasties, vol. 25.
- New History of the Five Dynasties, vol. 5.
- Zizhi Tongjian, vols. 246, 247, 248, 251, 252, 253, 255, 256.
