= Empress Hui'an =

Empress Hui'an (惠安皇后) (d. 866 CE) was the concubine of Emperor Yizong of Tang (Li Cui).

== Life ==
Her family background is unknown except for the fact that her surname is Wang (王). During Emperor Yizong's reign, she held the rank of Noble Consort (贵妃). She gave birth to a son, Li Xuan, eventually known as Xizong.

In the seventh year of Emperor Yizong's reign, she died.

When her son Li Xuan inherited the throne, he gave her the posthumous title of Empress Hui'an (惠安皇后)
