= Lu Yan =

Lu Yan (Chinese: 路巖; 829–874), courtesy name Luzhan (魯瞻), was an official of the Tang dynasty of China, serving as a chancellor during the reign of Emperor Yizong.

== Background and early career ==
Lu Yan was born in 829, during the reign of Emperor Wenzong. His family was originally from Wei Prefecture (魏州, headquartered in modern Handan, Hebei) and claimed its ancestry from the mythical emperor Shaohao, although the traceable ancestry went back only to the Jin dynasty (266–420) official Lu Jia (路嘉). Subsequent ancestors of Lu Yan's served as officials of the Northern Wei, Northern Zhou, Sui dynasty, and Tang dynasties. His grandfather Lu Jideng (路季登) and father Lu Qun (路群) both served in a number of posts in the imperial government. Lu Qun died in 834. Lu Yan had at least one older brother, Lu Yue (路嶽), who also later became an imperial government official (although a comment by the former chancellor Cui Xuan (see below) implied that Lu Yan was the 10th born son and so must have had eight other older brothers). Both Lu Yue and Lu Yan passed the imperial examinations in the Jinshi class during the middle of Dazhong era (847–860) of Emperor Wenzong's uncle Emperor Xuānzong.

Lu Yan was said to be highly intelligent in his youth. As many of his father's friends later served as regional governors, he often wrote them, and it was said that it was because their influence that he was promoted quickly. At one point, when Cui Xuan served as the military governor (Jiedushi) of Huainan Circuit (淮南, headquartered in modern Yangzhou, Jiangsu), Lu served under him as assistant governor. It was said that Cui recognized Lu's talent and made the remark, "Lu Ten [(i.e., implying that Lu Yan was the 10th born son)] will one day be in that particular office [(i.e., chancellor)]." It was said that thereafter, Lu was recalled to the capital Chang'an to serve as an imperial censor with the title Jiancha Yushi (監察御史), and thereafter would remain at the capital. Early in the Xiantong era (860–874) of Emperor Xuānzong's son Emperor Yizong, Lu served as Tuntian Yuanwailang (屯田員外郎), a low-level official at the ministry of public works (工部, Gongbu), and later an imperial scholar (翰林學士, Hanlin Xueshi), then a highly prestigious position. However, it was said that when Cui heard this news, he commended, "Alas, Lu Ten is an imperial scholar already? How can he live long given this?"

== Chancellorship ==
As of 864, Lu Yan was already both deputy minister of defense (兵部侍郎, Bingbu Shilang) and chief imperial scholar (翰林學士承旨, Hanlin Xueshi Chengzhi), when he was given the designation Tong Zhongshu Menxia Pingzhangshi (同中書門下平章事), making him a de facto chancellor, aged 35. It was said that Emperor Yizong, by that time, was not diligent in paying attention to the affairs of state, entrusting the decisions to Lu and, later, Lu's chancellor colleague Wei Baoheng (the husband of Emperor Yizong's favorite daughter Princess Tongchang). Lu took advantage of this to be corrupt and become extremely rich, and his attendants also often received bribes. The people came to despise him and Wei, comparing their attendants to the attendants of the deity of death, Yama. In 869, Chen Fansao (陳蟠叟) the magistrate of Zhide County (至德, in modern Chizhou, Anhui) submitted a petition in which he accused Lu's attendant Bian Xian (邊咸) of being so corrupt that, if the imperial government would seize Bian's properties, it would be sufficient to pay for the salaries of the entire imperial army for two years. Emperor Yizong reacted with anger, exiling Chen to Ai Prefecture (愛州, in modern Thanh Hóa Province, Vietnam). It was said that thereafter no one dared to criticize Lu any further. It was at the false accusations by Lu and Wei that the general Kang Chengxun, who had just suppressed the serious rebellion by Pang Xun, was exiled in 870. Further, later in 870, after Princess Tongchang died, when fellow chancellor Liu Zhan tried to intercede with Emperor Yizong to spare the lives of imperial physicians who had failed to save Princess Tongchang and whom Emperor Yizong, in anger, was set to execute, Lu took the opportunity to make false accusations that Liu had conspired with physicians, leading to Liu's being exiled to the extremely distant Huan Prefecture (驩州, in modern Nghệ An Province, Vietnam). When the chief imperial scholar Zheng Tian, in drafting the edict exiling Liu, used language that appeared to rebuke Liu but in reality was praising Liu for his frugality, Lu also had Zheng demoted.

Throughout the years, Lu and Wei had cooperated to hold onto power, but by 871, the men had a fallout, and Wei thus spoke to Emperor Yizong against Lu. In summer 871, Lu was therefore sent out of the capital to serve as the military governor of Xichuan Circuit (西川, headquartered in modern Chengdu, Sichuan), still carrying the Tong Zhongshu Menxia Pingzhangshi title as an honorary title. It was said that as Lu was heading out of the city, the people of Chang'an, despising him, were throwing rocks and brick shards at him. When Lu complained about this to the acting mayor of Jingzhao Municipality (京兆, i.e., the Chang'an region), Xue Neng (薛能), whom Lu had promoted, Xue mockingly bowed and responded, "There is no precedent for the municipality government to protect chancellors as they leave the city", embarrassing Lu.

== After chancellorship ==
Lu Yan appeared to have initially served at Xichuan with distinction, as he repaired the various passes which had been damaged during Dali incursions. When eight tribes became Tang vassals because of his efforts, he was given the honorific title of Zhongshu Ling (中書令) in 873, and created the Duke of Wei. After Emperor Yizong died later in 873 and was succeeded by his son Emperor Xizong, Lu was further given the honorific title of Shizhong (侍中).

However, Lu also continued to trust Bian Xian, as well as another attendant, Guo Chou (郭籌). It was said that the two effectively governed Xichuan, and the entire army was fearful of them. On one occasion, when Lu was examining the army, Bian and Guo were openly passing notes to each other and burning them after reading them. This led to immediate rumors that the two were planning a major conspiracy and caused the army to be disturbed. When the imperial government received word of this, it ordered that Lu be transferred to Jingnan Circuit (荊南, headquartered in modern Jingzhou, Hubei). Upon hearing of Lu's transfer order, Bian and Guo hid themselves and fled.

When Lu got to Jingnan's capital Jiangling, however, he was further demoted to be the prefect of Xin Prefecture (新洲, in modern Yunfu, Guangdong) – but it appeared that he was not even given an opportunity report there, but was instead detained at the Jiangling jail. Another edict was issued, exiling him to Dan Prefecture (儋州, roughly modern Danzhou, Hainan), and then another edict was issued ordering him to commit suicide. Pursuant to regulations that he himself had proposed to Emperor Yizong for those high-level officials ordered to commit suicide, a part of his trachea was removed from his body and sent back to Chang'an, to verify his death. After his death, Bian and Guo were captured and executed.

== Notes and references ==
- Old Book of Tang, vol. 177.
- New Book of Tang, vol. 184.
- Zizhi Tongjian, vols. 250, 251, 252.
