= Gao Qu =

Tang Chinese official

Gao Qu (高璩) (died 865), courtesy name Yingzhi (瑩之), was an official of the Chinese Tang dynasty, who served briefly (less than one year) during the reign of Emperor Yizong.

== Background ==
Gao Qu's family was descended from the imperial house of Northern Qi, and one of his ancestors, Gao Shilian, served as a chancellor during the reign of the great early Tang emperor Emperor Taizong, although the Gao family was not subsequently prominent. Both Gao Qu's uncle Gao Shaoyi (高少逸) and father Gao Yuanyu (高元裕), however, were prominent officials in the imperial government.

== Early career ==
Gao Qu passed the imperial examinations in the Jinshi class in 849, during the reign of Emperor Xuānzong of Tang, and after that he served on the staffs of regional governors. He later served as Zuo Shiyi (左拾遺), a low-level advisory official at the examination bureau of government (門下省, Menxia Sheng), and was made an imperial scholar (翰林學士, Hanlin Xueshi), apparently during Emperor Xuānzong's reign. He was later raised in his examination bureau post from Zuo Shiyi to Jianyi Daifu (諫議大夫), against the trend at the time that imperial scholars were rarely promoted in their other posts.

== Chancellorship ==
During the reign of Emperor Xuānzong's son Emperor Yizong, Gao Qu was made the military governor of Dongchuan Circuit (東川, headquartered in modern Mianyang, Sichuan), but soon thereafter was recalled to Chang'an to serve as deputy minister of defense (兵部侍郎, Bingbu Shilang), with the additional designation of Tong Zhongshu Menxia Pingzhangshi (同中書門下平章事), making him a chancellor. He died ten months thereafter and was given posthumous honors — although, at the urging of the scholar Cao Ye (曹鄴), who argued that many of Gao's associations were with improper people, he was given the rather unflattering posthumous name of La (剌, "indiscriminate").

== Notes and references ==
- Old Book of Tang, vol. 171.
- New Book of Tang, vol. 177.
- Zizhi Tongjian, vol. 250.
