= Liu Zhan =

Chancellor during Tang Dynasty (died 874)

Liu Zhan (劉瞻) (died September 29, 874), courtesy name Jizhi (幾之), was an official of the Chinese Tang dynasty, serving as a chancellor during the reigns of Emperor Yizong and (briefly) Emperor Yizong's son Emperor Xizong.

== Background ==
It is not known when Liu Zhan was born. His family was originally from Pengcheng, but by Liu Zhan's time had relocated to Guiyang (桂陽, in modern Guilin, Guangxi). His ancestry is only traceable to his grandfather Liu Sheng (劉升), who was not listed with any official titles, and his father Liu Jing (劉景), who served as a staff member for a military governor of Fufang Circuit (鄜坊, headquartered in modern Yan'an, Shaanxi).

== Early career ==
Early in the Taihe era (827-835) of Emperor Wenzong, Liu Zhan passed the imperial examinations in the Jinshi class. In 830, he further passed a special imperial examination for those with broad knowledge and grand speech. At the recommendation of the official Xu Shang, Liu Zhan was made a staff member at the directorate for the salt and iron monopolies. Liu was subsequently made Taichang Boshi (太常博士), a scholar at the ministry of worship (太常寺, Taichang Si). Subsequently, when Liu Zhuan was chancellor, because Liu Zhan shared a surname with him, Liu Zhuan recommended him to be an imperial scholar (翰林學士, Hanlin Xueshi). Liu Zhan was subsequently also made Zhongshu Sheren (中書舍人), a mid-level post at the legislative bureau of government (中書省, Zhongshu Sheng), and then deputy minister of census (戶部侍郎, Hubu Shilang) as well as chief imperial scholar (翰林學士承旨, Hanlin Xueshi Chengzhi). He was later sent out of the capital to serve as the military governor (Jiedushi) of Hedong Circuit (河東, headquartered in modern Taiyuan, Shanxi) as well as the mayor of its capital Taiyuan Municipality. He was later recalled to be the mayor of Jingzhao Municipality (京兆, i.e., the region of the capital Chang'an), and later again the deputy minister of census and imperial scholar.

== First chancellorship and removal ==
In 869, then-reigning Emperor Yizong gave Liu Zhan the designation Tong Zhongshu Menxia Pingzhangshi (同中書門下平章事), making him a chancellor de facto. He was subsequently given the additional posts of Zhongshu Shilang (中書侍郎), the deputy head of the legislative bureau; minister of justice (刑部尚書, Xingbu Shangshu); and imperial scholar at Jixian Institution (集賢殿).

In 870, Emperor Yizong's favorite daughter Princess Tongchang died. In anger, Emperor Yizong executed some 20 of imperial physicians who were unable to save her, and further had some 300 of their family members arrested. Liu initially requested the advisory officials, whose responsibilities were to correct the emperor's behavior, to submit petitions to ask for lenience on their behalf, but none of the advisory officials dared to do so, so Liu himself did, drawing Emperor Yizong's displeasure. Subsequently, both he and the mayor of Jingzhao, Wen Zhang (溫璋), met with Emperor Yizong to further to plead for these prisoners' case; Emperor Yizong had them ejected from his presence. Soon thereafter, Liu was sent out of the capital to serve as the military governor of Jingnan Circuit (荊南, headquartered in modern Jingzhou, Hubei), and Wen committed suicide. A number of other officials who were friendly with Liu were demoted, as was the chief imperial scholar Zheng Tian, who drafted an edict that outwardly rebuked Liu but was instead praising Liu for his frugality, thus angering the chancellor Lu Yan, who bore a grudge against Liu. At instigation by Lu and Princess Tongchang's husband Wei Baoheng, Liu was further accused with conspiring with the imperial physicians to poison Princess Tongchang, and Liu was thereafter demoted to be the prefect of Kang Prefecture (康州, in modern Zhaoqing, Guangdong), and yet later the census officer at Huan Prefecture (驩州, in modern Nghệ An Province, Vietnam). The edict announcing that demotion was drafted by Li Yu (李庾), at Lu's behest, using extremely harsh language that suggested that Liu would next be put to death. It was said that the people of the empire all lamented the false accusations, and the military governor of Lulong Circuit (盧龍, headquartered in modern Beijing), Zhang Gongsu, submitted a petition defending Liu. In apprehension, Lu did not dare to have Liu put to death.

After Emperor Yizong died in 873 and was succeeded by his son Emperor Xizong, Liu was first promoted to be the prefect of Kang Prefecture, and then the prefect of Guo Prefecture (虢州, in modern Sanmenxia, Henan). In 874, he was recalled to Chang'an to serve as the minister of justice. It was said that when the people of Chang'an heard of Liu's recall, they, out of their own pocket, hired circus workers to put on a grand welcoming procession for Liu. Liu, however, not wanting to create a scene, bypassed the route of the procession.

== Second chancellorship and death ==
In summer 874, after the death of the chancellor Pei Tan, Liu Zhan was again made Zhongshu Shilang and chancellor. However, it was said that his chancellor colleague Liu Ye, who had joined the efforts of Lu Yan and Wei Baoheng in defaming Liu Zhan, was apprehensive of this development. In fall 874, Liu Ye invited Liu Zhan to a feast at the directorate of the salt and iron monopolies, and Liu Zhan fell ill after the feast. He soon died, prompting the people to believe that it was Liu Ye who poisoned him.

It was said in the New Book of Tang that Liu Zhan was frugal, and he used his salary to aid those in his clan who were poor, keeping no reserve for himself. He also kept no mansion. He refused any bribe offered to him, and he remained true to these principles to the end.

== Notes and references ==
- Old Book of Tang, vol. 177.
- New Book of Tang, vol. 181.
- Zizhi Tongjian, vols. 251, 252.
