= Li Zi =

Chinese prince

Li Zi (李滋) (died 897), formally the Prince of Tong (通王), was an imperial prince of the Chinese Tang dynasty. He was the favorite son of Emperor Xuānzong, but was unable to take the throne after Emperor Xuānzong's death, as his older brother Li Wen (Emperor Yizong) was chosen by the eunuch Wang Zongshi (王宗實), who overpowered other eunuchs who supported Li Zi. Later, during the reign of Emperor Yizong's son (Li Zi's nephew) Emperor Zhaozong, Emperor Zhaozong tried to commission imperial princes to command armies to counteract the powerful warlords (jiedushi) and eunuchs. In response, in 897, when Emperor Zhaozong had to flee to the domain of one of the warlords, Han Jian, Han falsely accused 11 imperial princes, including Li Zi, of treason, and massacred them without approval from Emperor Zhaozong.

== Background ==
It is not known when Li Zi was born, but as his oldest brother Li Wen was born in 833, and Li Zi was already born by the time that his father Li Chen became emperor (as Emperor Xuānzong) in 846, he must have been born between those dates. When Emperor Xuānzong became emperor, he created five of his sons imperial princes, including Li Zi, who was created the Prince of Kui. Li Zi was Emperor Xuānzong's third son. His mother's name is lost to history.

Li Zi was said to be Emperor Xuānzong's favorite son, and he lived in the palace with four of his brothers, while Li Wen, then the Prince of Yun, who was not favored, was sent out of the palace to live at the residence of the imperial princes, known as the Sixteen Mansions. Emperor Xuānzong also commissioned the officials Zheng Zhang (鄭璋) and Li Ye (李鄴) to attend to Li Zi's studies, lecturing him once every five days.

== Failure to succeed to the throne ==
As Li Zi was Emperor Xuānzong's favorite son, Emperor Xuānzong repeatedly considered creating him crown prince, but as Li Zi was not the oldest son, he hesitated, and went throughout his reign without designating an heir. In 859, when Emperor Xuānzong grew seriously ill due to the side effects of the immortality pills that were given to him by the alchemists Li Xuanbo (李玄伯), Yu Zizhi (虞紫芝), and Wang Le (王樂), he entrusted Li Zi to three eunuchs that he favored—the directors of palace communications Wang Guizhang (王歸長) and Ma Gongru (馬公儒), and the liaison with imperial officials Wang Jufang (王居方). The three eunuchs were suspicious of Wang Zongshi, who commanded the Left Shence Army (左神策軍), and they issued an edict in Emperor Xuānzong's name, sending Wang Zongshi out of the capital Chang'an to serve as the eunuch monitor of Huainan Circuit (淮南, headquartered in modern Yangzhou, Jiangsu). Wang Zongshi initially was set to report to Huainan after receiving the edicts, but his deputy Qi Yuanshi (亓元實) reminded him that he had not seen Emperor Xuānzong for a month and that he could not be sure that it was Emperor Xuānzong who actually wished him gone. With Qi's support, Wang Zongshi forced his way into the palace and found that Emperor Xuānzong had already died. He arrested Wang Guizhang, Ma, and Wang Jufang on charges of falsifying the imperial edict, and then sent soldiers to the Sixteen Mansions to welcome Li Wen to the palace. He then issued an edict in Emperor Xuānzong's name creating Li Wen crown prince. Soon thereafter, Li Wen (whose name was changed to Li Cui) took the throne (as Emperor Yizong).

After Emperor Yizong took the throne, the institution of having Zheng Zhang and Li Ye attend to Li Zi's studies was discontinued, although Li Zi appeared to have suffered no other reprisal. His title was also changed to Prince of Tong. (According to Li Zi's biography in the Old Book of Tang, Li Zi actually died during Emperor Yizong's reign, in 863, while still carrying the title of Prince of Kui, and that statement was incorporated into the Zizhi Tongjian. However, as those records were inconsistent with Li Zi's biography in the New Book of Tang, which described the events below, as well as the Zizhi Tongjian, which inconsistently also adopted the New Book of Tang records, it will be assumed below that Li Zi did not die in 863.)

== During Emperor Zhaozong's reign ==
By 896, by which time Emperor Yizong's son Emperor Zhaozong was emperor, the empire was, effectively, broken up into warlord territories, with the imperial government holding little power, and even within Chang'an itself, the eunuchs controlled the armies. In 896, Emperor Zhaozong tried to remedy the situation by putting imperial princes in command of newly recruited soldiers, including having Li Zi command the palace guards. In summer 896, when Emperor Zhaozong was offended by the arrogance of the warlord Li Maozhen (who controlled the nearby Fengxiang Circuit (鳳翔, headquartered in modern Baoji, Shaanxi), he had Li Zi, Li Sizhou (李嗣周) the Prince of Qin, and Li Jiepi (李戒丕) the Prince of Yan take up defensive positions around the capital. Li Maozhen was concerned that Emperor Zhaozong would act against him, Li Maozhen took the preemptive step of attacking armies commanded by Li Sizhou and Li Jiepi. The Fengxiang forces defeated the inexperienced forces under Li Sizhou and Li Jiepi easily and approached Chang'an.

Emperor Zhaozong sought immediate aid from another warlord, Li Keyong, the military governor of Hedong Circuit (河東, headquartered in modern Taiyuan, Shanxi), while preparing to flee to Hedong. Once he left Chang'an, however, he hesitated at the long trek to Hedong's capital Taiyuan, and when Han Jian the military governor of nearby Zhenguo Circuit (鎮國, headquartered in modern Weinan, Shaanxi) personally met him and persuaded him to go to Han's headquarters at Hua Prefecture (華州) instead, he agreed, and he took his train there.

Once Emperor Zhaozong arrived at Hua Prefecture, however, it became clear that Han intended to control the emperor, not vice versa. As Han was displeased that eight princes (Li Zi, as well as the Princes of Mu, Ji, Shao, Peng, Han, Yi, and Chen, whose names have been lost to history) were still commanding the imperial guards, he falsely accused the princes of planning to murder Han and then kidnap the emperor. Emperor Zhaozong tried to summon Han to his presence to explain, but Han refused, and when Emperor Zhaozong ordered the princes to personally explain to Han, Han also refused to meet with them. Han then had his own soldiers surround the provisional palace. Emperor Zhaozong was forced to disband the imperial princes' armies, and Han put the imperial princes under house arrest. Further, under Han's insistence, Emperor Zhaozong was forced to execute one of the imperial guard generals, Li Yun (李筠).

Later in the year, after Li Jiepi, who had previously gone to Hedong to seek aid from Li Keyong, returned to Hua Prefecture—thus exposing the fact that Li Keyong would be unable to come to the emperor's or the princes' aid—Han submitted further accusations that Li Jiepi and Li Sizhou were plotting treasons. Emperor Zhaozong tried to ignore Han's accusations, but Han and the eunuch Liu Jishu then surrounded the provisional Sixteen Mansions. They seized Li Zi, Li Sizhou, Li Jiepi, Li Yun (李允) the Prince of Dan, as well as the Princes of Yi, Mu, Ji, Shao, Peng, Han, and Chen, took them to nearby Shiti Valley (石隄谷), and killed them there.

== Notes and references ==
- Old Book of Tang, vol. 175.
- New Book of Tang, vol. 82.
- Zizhi Tongjian, vols. 248, 249, 260, 261.
