= Emperor Yizong of Tang =

Emperor of Tang China from 859 to 873

Emperor Yizong of Tang 唐懿宗
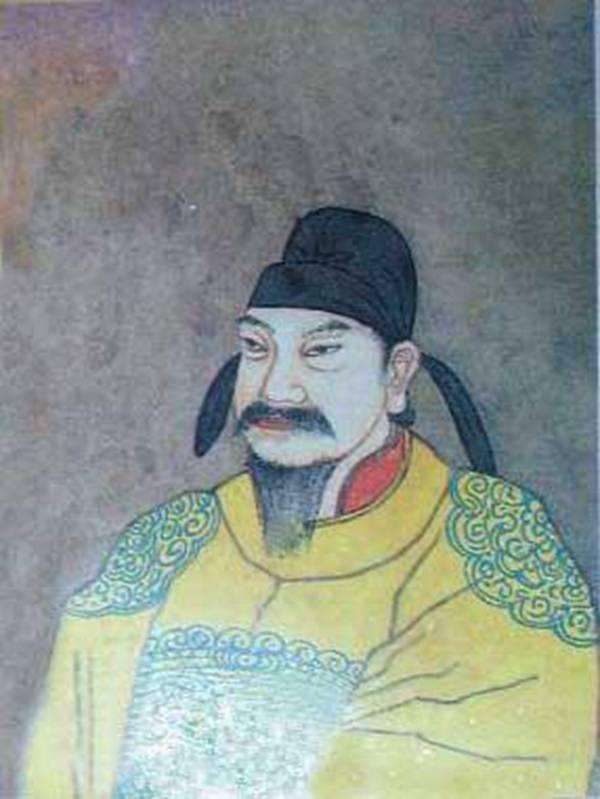

Emperor of the Tang dynasty
- Reign: September 13, 859 – August 15, 873
- Predecessor: Emperor Xuanzong
- Successor: Emperor Xizong
- Born: December 28, 833
- Died: August 15, 873 (aged 39)
- Burial: Jian Mausoleum (簡陵)
- Consorts: Empress Hui'an (died 866); Empress Gongxian (died 867)
- Issue: Li Yi; Li Ting; Li Ji; Li Kan; Emperor Xizong; Li Bao; Emperor Zhaozong; Li Yi; Princess Weiwenyi; Princess Anhua; Princess Changyuan; Princess Changning; Princess Jinhua; Princess Renshou; Princess Yongshou; Princess Suining
Full name
- Family name: Lǐ (李); Given name: Initially Wēn (溫), later Cuī (漼) (changed 859)
Era name and dates
- Xíantōng (咸通): December 17, 860 – December 17, 874
Posthumous name
- Emperor Gonghui (恭惠皇帝) (short); Emperor Zhaosheng Gonghui Xiao (昭聖恭惠孝皇帝) (full)
Temple name
- Yìzōng (懿宗)
- House: Li
- Dynasty: Tang
- Father: Emperor Xuanzong
- Mother: Empress Yuanzhao

Tang Yizong
- Chinese: 唐懿宗
- Literal meaning: "Restrained Ancestor of the Tang"
Transcriptions
Standard Mandarin
- Hanyu Pinyin: Táng Yìzōng

Li Wen
- Chinese: 李溫
- Literal meaning: (personal name)
Transcriptions
Standard Mandarin
- Hanyu Pinyin: Lǐ Wēn

Emperor Yizong of Tang (December 28, 833 – August 15, 873), né Li Wen, later changed to Li Cui (Chinese: 李漼), was the 20th emperor of the Tang dynasty of China. He reigned from 859 to 873. Emperor Yizong was the eldest son of Emperor Xuanzong. After Emperor Xuanzong's death in 859, Emperor Yizong was placed on the throne by the eunuch Wang Zongshi (王宗實), who killed other eunuchs supporting another son of Emperor Xuanzong, Li Zi the Prince of Kui.

According to traditional historians, Emperor Yizong did not pay much attention to governmental affairs but instead chose to live in opulence, became an alcoholic and surrounded himself with women while his government levied heavy taxes on its citizens. A deeply devout Buddhist, even more so than his father, he would hold grand Buddhist ceremonies throughout the year as well as ordering frequent musical performances in the palace. If the entertainment was to his liking, Yizong would not only reward the entertainers greatly but also bestow governmental ranks. Emperor Yizong eventually exhausted the empire's treasury that had accumulated during his father's administration. Extreme hardships, including famines that forced people to resort to cannibalism, led to widespread agrarian rebellions late in his reign. Those rebellions would plague the reign of his son Emperor Xizong.

== Background ==
Li Wen was born around the new year 834, during the reign of his cousin Emperor Wenzong. His father Li Yi was then the Prince of Guang, and Li Wen was born at Li Yi's mansion. He was Li Yi's first son. His mother was Li Yi's concubine Lady Chao.

== As imperial prince ==
In 846, after the death of Emperor Wenzong's brother and successor Emperor Wuzong, Li Yi, whose name was changed to Li Chen, became emperor (as Emperor Xuanzong). He created five of his sons, including Li Wen, imperial princes, with Li Wen carrying the title of Prince of Yun. Li Wen's mother Lady Chao was created the imperial consort rank of Meiren (美人), which was only the 15th highest rank for imperial consorts (and there could be as many as nine Meiren at any single point). She died sometime in the middle of Emperor Xuanzong's Dazhong era (847–860), and was posthumously created the higher rank of Zhaorong (昭容), the sixth highest rank for imperial consorts.

Li Wen was not favored by his father, whose favorite son was his younger brother Li Zi the Prince of Kui; as a result, Li Wen was sent out of the palace to live at the imperial princes' residence, known as the Sixteen Mansions, while Li Zi and four other princes lived in the palace. Emperor Xuanzong also considered creating Li Zi crown prince, but hesitated because Li Wen, not Li Zi, was his oldest son, and therefore went throughout his entire reign without designating an heir.

Late in Emperor Xuanzong's reign, he came to favor certain alchemists who promised immortality, and he took pills that they made. It was said that as a result, he became paranoid and easily angered. By 859, as a side effect of those pills, he had a large ulcerous boil on his back, such that he was bedridden and could not meet with the chancellors or other officials. He entrusted Li Zi to three high-level eunuchs that he favored—the directors of palace communications (Shumishi) Wang Guizhang (王歸長) and Ma Gongru (馬公儒) and the director of the southern court affairs (宣徽南院使, Xuanhui Nanyuanshi) Wang Jufang (王居方). After Emperor Xuanzong died, Wang Guizhang, Ma, and Wang Jufang did not initially announce his death, and were set to send one of the eunuch commanders of the Shence Armies (神策軍), Wang Zongshi (王宗實), who was not on good terms with them, out of Chang'an to Huai'nan Circuit (淮南, headquartered in modern Yangzhou, Jiangsu) to serve as the eunuch monitor for Huai'nan. Wang Zongshi, however, reacted by intruding into the palace; finding that Emperor Xuanzong had already died, he arrested Wang Guizhang, Ma, and Wang Jufang for falsely issuing edicts, and then put them to death. He welcomed Li Wen to the palace, and then issued an edict in Emperor Xuanzong's name creating Li Wen crown prince and changing his name to Li Cui. The next day, Emperor Xuanzong's death was announced, and Li Cui became emperor (as Emperor Yizong).

== Early reign ==
Emperor Yizong honored his grandmother (Emperor Xuanzong's mother) Empress Dowager Zheng as grand empress dowager, while posthumously honoring his mother Consort Chao as empress dowager. Meanwhile, long-time lead chancellor Linghu Tao was relieved of his chancellor position and replaced with the former chancellor Bai Minzhong, although Bai, when recalled to the capital Chang'an, fell and suffered an injury while he was climbing up the stairs at the imperial meeting hall, and therefore never actually assumed chancellor position before resigning in early 861.

Meanwhile, Emperor Yizong was immediately met with two military crises. Tang and Nanzhao had gotten into a diplomatic row over the name of the Nanzhao king Qiulong (酋龍)—as it violated naming taboo for Emperor Yizong's ancestor Emperor Xuanzong (Li Longji). Emperor Yizong thus refused to issue an edict formally bestowing Qiulong his kingly title. Qiulong responded by changing his state's name to Dali and declaring himself emperor (thus positioning himself as an equal to Emperor Yizong) and by attacking a number of Tang outposts. Meanwhile, the agrarian rebel Qiu Fu (裘甫) and his followers were overrunning Zhedong Circuit (浙東, headquartered in modern Shaoxing, Zhejiang). Qiu's rebellion was suppressed by the imperial general Wang Shi in 860, but the Dali attacks would become more intense, and Dali briefly captured the important city Yong Prefecture (邕州, in modern Nanning, Guangxi) in 861 and then captured Jiao Prefecture (交州, in modern Hanoi, Vietnam) in 862, retaining it. Despite these crises, Emperor Yizong was said to be spending much of his time in feast and games, ignoring the affairs of state, despite his officials' urging to attend to them, although he was sending generals to the Dali front (including Kang Chengxun and Gao Pian), without initial success.

== Middle reign ==
Over the course of 865–866, however, Gao Pian was able to defeat Dali forces and recapture Jiao Prefecture. Meanwhile, though, the tense situation on the Dali border at Xichuan Circuit (西川, headquartered in modern Chengdu, Sichuan) led to a major misstep on the part of Emperor Yizong, as he was misled by the official Li Shiwang (李師望) into carving out seven border prefectures out of Xichuan into a new Dingbian Circuit (定邊, headquartered at Xi Prefecture (巂州), in modern Chengdu) and commissioning Li Shiwang as its military governor despite the obvious impractical nature of Dingbian's territory—as Xi Prefecture was extremely close to Xichuan's capital Chengdu Municipality and unsuitable to serve as the capital for a circuit intended to concentrate on border defense. The Dingbian debacle demoralized the officers at Xichuan, who went as far as secretly encouraging Dali to attack Dingbian to expose Li Shiwang.

Yet more disastrous, though, was a mutiny by soldiers for Xusi Circuit (徐泗, headquartered in modern Xuzhou, Jiangsu), who had been posted to Gui Prefecture (桂州, in modern Guilin, Guangxi) to defend against a potential Dali attack, with a promise that they would be allowed to return home after three years. When the term was up in 868, however, the governor of Xusi Circuit, Cui Yanzeng (崔彥曾), ordered that the term be extended one year, causing the Xusi soldiers to mutiny under the leadership of Pang Xun. They headed northeast home, and when they reached Xusi's capital Xu Prefecture (徐州), they attacked and captured it. After Pang's initial attempts to obtain an imperial commission was rebuffed, the mutineer army attacked the nearby regions, with the imperial forces unable to stop them. Not until Kang Chengxun, with major assistance from the Shatuo chieftain Zhuye Chixin (who was bestowed the imperial surname of Li, as well as a new name of Guochang because of his contributions), was able to defeat Pang in 869 was the rebellion suppressed. (Subsequently, though, Kang, due to the false accusations of the chancellor Lu Yan and the imperial scholar Wei Baoheng (the husband of Emperor Yizong's favorite daughter Princess Tongchang), was exiled.)

== Late reign ==
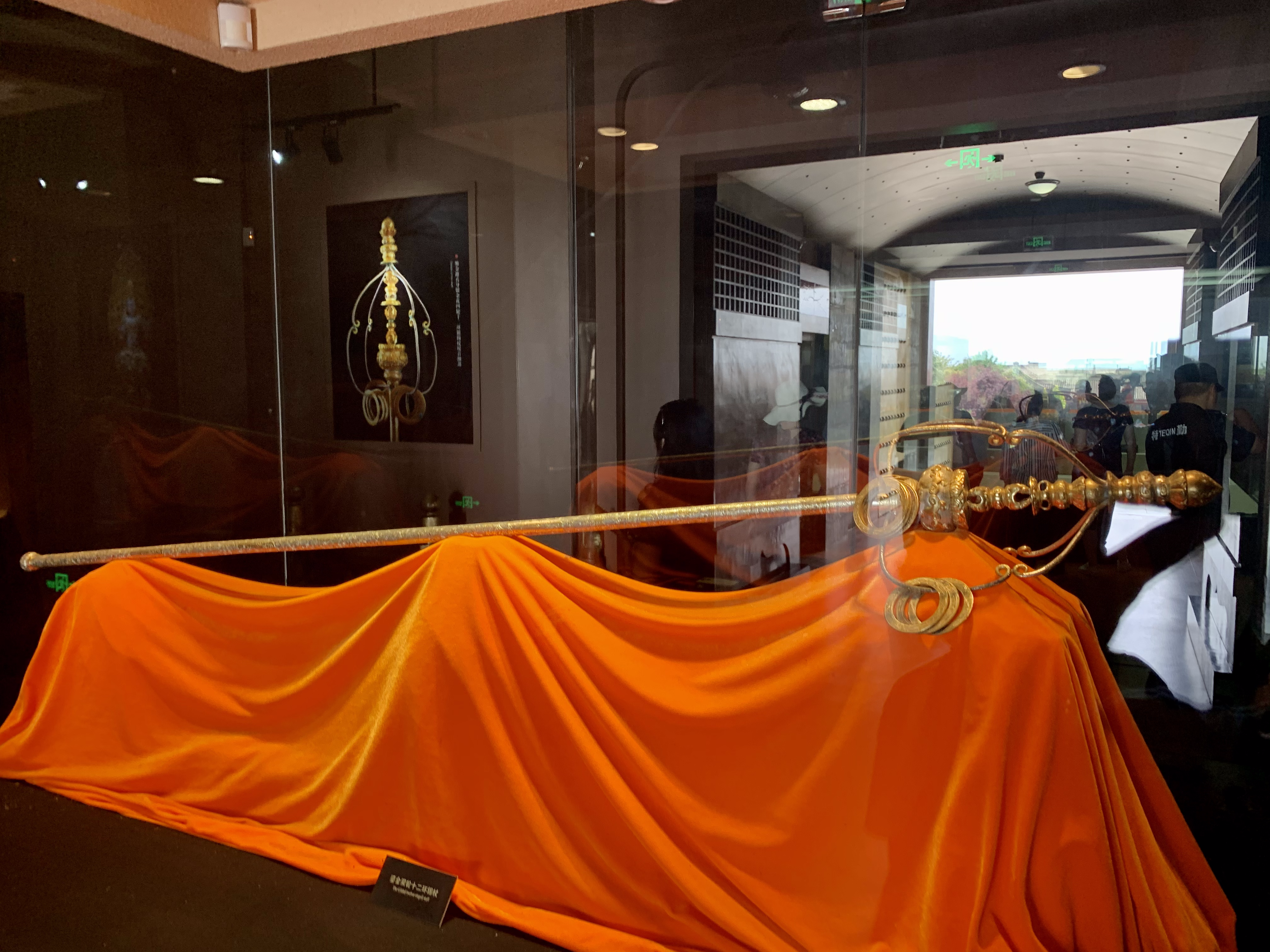
A gold and silver staff gifted to Famen Temple in 873. The rod is 196.5 cm long, and weighs 2390 grams.

Meanwhile, late in 869, Li Shiwang provoked Dali by killing its emissary Yang Qiuqing (楊酋慶). Dali's emperor Qiulong thus launched a major attack on Dingbian, and neither Li nor his successor Dou Pang (竇滂) was able to repel it. The Dali forces quickly arrived at Chengdu's vicinity and put Chengdu under siege. Emperor Yizong commissioned Gao Pian as Xichuan's military governor, and Dali forces thereafter withdrew, but both Dingbian (which was then merged back into Xichuan) and Xichuan had been deeply wounded.

Princess Tongchang died in 870, and this caused a major display of Emperor Yizong's caprice at the capital Chang'an, as Emperor Yizong, in anger that the imperial physicians were not able to cure her, executed some 20 imperial physicians and had some 300 of their relatives imprisoned. When the chancellor Liu Zhan and the mayor of Jingzhao Municipality (京兆, i.e., the Chang'an region) Wen Zhang (溫璋) tried to intercede, both were exiled; in response, Wen committed suicide. Princess Tongchang was buried in a grand ceremony that demonstrated Emperor Yizong's wastefulness. As described in the Zizhi Tongjian:

The members of the Wei household fought over the ashes of the items burned as offerings to the Princess, in order to sieve out the gold and the silver among the ashes. The clothing, jewelry, and toys burned filled 120 wagons each. The paper ceremonial guards and paper guard corps were decorated with colorful silk, jewelry, and jade, as were the items that she would be using in the underworld, such that the light reflected from them from as far as 20 li away. The Emperor awarded the funereal household over 100 hu [(斛, a unit of fluid volume) of wine, and cakes that required 40 camels to bear them, to supply the workers laboring at the funeral. The Emperor and Consort Guo [(Princess Tongchang's mother and Emperor Yizong's favorite concubine)] missed their daughter greatly, and they commissioned the musician Li Keji [(李可及)] to author a music piece entitled, "Lamentation for a Hundred Years," with sad and delicate tones and several hundred dancers set to dance to it. The palace storage provided large numbers of jewels to decorate the dancers, and some 800 pi [(匹, a unit of textile length)] of silk serving as the carpet they danced on. After their dance was over, the jewelry that fell off them covered the ground completely.

Despite Princess Tongchang's death, Emperor Yizong continued to remain close to Wei Baoheng, who became extremely powerful and corrupt late in Emperor Yizong's reign. Emperor Yizong also reacted in anger whenever Consort Guo's family was accused of misconduct.

In 873, in a grand ceremony, Emperor Yizong welcomed what was claimed to be a relic (a finger bone) of Gautama Buddha to the palace, despite warnings by some that his grandfather Emperor Xianzong died shortly after also welcoming the same relic to the palace. (Emperor Yizong responded to the warnings by stating, "As long as I can see it once while living, I do not have regrets about dying.") The ceremony was said to bring out great offerings by the households of Chang'an. Emperor Yizong himself walked toward the relic and bowed on the ground in tears.

Later in the year, Emperor Yizong became critically ill. With his not having designated an heir, the eunuchs Liu Xingshen (劉行深) and Han Wenyue (韓文約) supported his 11-year-old son Li Yan the Prince of Pu as his heir. Liu and Han had an edict issued in Emperor Yizong's name creating Li Yan crown prince. Emperor Yizong died the next day, and Li Yan took the throne (as Emperor Xizong).

== Chancellors during reign ==
- Linghu Tao (859)
- Xiao Ye (859)
- Xiahou Zi (859–860, 862–864)
- Jiang Shen (859–862)
- Du Shenquan (859–863)
- Bai Minzhong (859–861)
- Bi Xian (860–863)
- Du Cong (861–863)
- Yang Shou (863–866)
- Cao Que (863–870)
- Xiao Zhi (864–865)
- Lu Yan (864–871)
- Gao Qu (865)
- Xu Shang (865–869)
- Yu Cong (867–872)
- Liu Zhan (869–870)
- Wei Baoheng (870–873)
- Wang Duo (870–873)
- Liu Ye (871–873)
- Zhao Yin (873)

== Family ==
- Empress Hui'an, of the Wang clan (惠安皇后 王氏; d. 866)
  - Li Xuan, Xizong (僖宗 李儇; 862–888), 5th son
- Empress Gongxian, of the Wang clan (恭憲皇后 王氏/恭宪皇后; d. 867)
  - Li Ye, Zhaozong (昭宗 李曄; 867–904), 7th son
  - Li Yi, Crown Prince Gong'ai (恭哀皇太子 李倚; d. 897), 8th son
- Noble Consort, of the Yang clan of Hongnong (貴妃 弘農楊氏/贵妃 弘弄杨氏, 833 – 17 May 865)
- Pure Consort, of the Guo clan (淑妃 郭氏)
  - Princess Weiwenyi (衛文懿公主/卫文懿公主; 849–870), 1st daughter
    - Married Wei Baoheng of Jingzhao (京兆; d. 873) in 869
- Virtuous Consort, of the Wang clan (德妃 王氏; 844–870)
  - Princess Changning (昌寧公主/昌宁公主), 5th daughter
  - Two sons: Qilang (七郎), Balang (八郎)
- Jieyu, of the Cui clan (婕妤 崔氏)
- Jieyu, of the Wang clan (婕妤 王氏)
- Lady, of the Lei clan (雷氏)
  - Li Ting, Prince of Liang (涼王 李侹; d. 878), 2nd son
- Unknown
  - Li Yi, Prince of Wei (魏王 李佾; d. 879), 1st son
  - Li Ji, Prince of Shu (蜀王 李佶; killed 873), 3rd son
  - Li Kan, Prince of Wei (威王 李侃; 861-893), 4th son
  - Li Bao, Prince of Ji (吉王 李保; executed 897?), 6th son
  - Princess Anhua (安化公主), 2nd daughter
  - Princess Pukang (普康公主; 861–866), 3rd daughter
  - Princess Changyuan (昌元公主)
  - Princess Jinhua (金華公主/金华公主)
  - Princess Renshou (仁壽公主/仁寿公主)
  - Princess Yongshou (永壽公主/永寿公主)
  - Princess Suining (遂寧公主/遂宁公主), 11th daughter

== Sources ==
- Old Book of Tang, vol. 19, part 1.
- New Book of Tang, vol. 9.
- Zizhi Tongjian, vols. 248, 249, 250, 251, 252.
- 任士英 (2005) 正說唐朝二十一帝 Taipei (台北): 聯經. ISBN 978-957-08-2943-3

Regnal titles
| Preceded by Emperor Xuanzong of Tang | Emperor of Tang China; 859–873 | Succeeded by Emperor Xizong of Tang |
