= Wei Baoheng =

Tang Chinese bureaucrat (died 873)

Wei Baoheng (韋保衡) (died 873), courtesy name Yunyong (蘊用), was an official of the Chinese Tang dynasty. He became extremely powerful late in the reign of his father-in-law Emperor Yizong, rising to the post of chancellor and becoming the most powerful official at court, but after Emperor Yizong's death was accused of crimes, exiled, and forced to commit suicide.

== Background ==
It is not known when Wei Baoheng was born. He was a member of the prominent Wei clan of Jingzhao (京兆, i.e., the region of the Tang dynasty capital Chang'an), in the branch that was known as the Duke of Pingqi Branch—named after one of his ancestors, Wei Tian (韋瑱), who carried the title of Duke of Pingqi during Northern Zhou. Wei Baoheng's ancestors traced their male-line ancestry through a line of officials of Han dynasty, Cao Wei, Northern Wei, Northern Zhou, Sui dynasty, and Tang. His grandfather Wei Yuanzhen (韋元貞) was not listed with any official titles, although both Wei Yuanzhen and Wei Baoheng's father Wei Que (韋愨) were said to have passed the imperial examinations in the Jinshi class, and Wei Que served in the imperial government, eventually serving as the military governor (Jiedushi) of Wuchang Circuit (武昌, headquartered in modern Wuhan, Hubei). According to the table of the chancellors' family tree in the New Book of Tang, Wei Baoheng had at least one older brother, Wei Delin (韋德鄰), and at least five younger brothers, Wei Baoyin (韋保殷), Wei Shensi (韋慎思), Wei Baofan (韋保範), Wei Bao'ai (韋保乂), and Wei Baohe (韋保合), each of whom would eventually serve as an official.

== During Emperor Yizong's reign ==
In 864, during the reign of Emperor Yizong, Wei Baoheng passed the imperial examinations in the Jinshi class. In 869, by which time Wei was You Shiyi (右拾遺), a low-level advisory official at the legislative bureau of government (中書省, Zhongshu Sheng), Emperor Yizong gave Wei his favorite daughter, Princess Tongchang (born of Consort Guo), in marriage, and gave them a large mansion at Guangde Block (廣德里) in Chang'an as their house. It was said that Emperor Yizong spared no treasure in the palace in giving Princess Tongchang her dowry:

The doors [of the mansion] were adorned with all kinds of jewels. Even the guardrail for the well, the mortars, the manger, and the doghouse were made with gold and silver. Even the boji and baskets were made with gold threads.

Wei subsequently was promoted to be Zuo Jianyi Daifu (左諫議大夫), a high-level advisory official at the examination bureau (門下省, Menxia Sheng), as well as imperial scholar (翰林學士, Hanlin Xueshi). In 870, he teamed with the chancellor Lu Yan in making accusations against the general Kang Chengxun, who had just suppressed a major rebellion led by Pang Xun, and Kang was exiled. Later in the year, by which time Wei was carrying the titles of deputy minister of defense (兵部侍郎, Bingbu Shilang) and chief imperial scholar (翰林學士承旨, Hanlin Xueshi Chengzhi), Wei was further given the designation Tong Zhongshu Menxia Pingzhangshi (同中書門下平章事), making him a chancellor de facto. Because of Wei's marriage with Princess Tongchang, he was allowed to enter the palace at will and often feasted with Consort Guo, leading to rumors that he was having an affair with Consort Guo.

In fall 870, Princess Tongchang died. Emperor Yizong was greatly saddened and angered. He executed a group of imperial physicians who failed to save her, and further arrested some 300 of their relatives, despite intercessions by the chancellor Liu Zhan and the mayor of Jingzhao, Wen Zhang (溫璋). For their attempts to intercede, Liu was demoted, and Wen, hearing this, committed suicide. Lu and Wei then further falsely accused Liu of conspiring with the physicians to poison Princess Tongchang, and Liu was exiled to the extremely remote Huan Prefecture (驩州, in modern Nghệ An Province, Vietnam).

Despite Princess Tongchang's death, Wei's power did not wane, and he eventually came into conflict with Lu. He therefore spoke against Lu before Emperor Yizong, and Lu was removed from his chancellor position in 871. Similarly removed were fellow chancellors Yu Cong (in 872) and Wang Duo (in 873), both of whom had slighted Wei. A group of officials accused of being friendly with Yu were demoted, including Xiao Gou. (Wei's actions against Wang and Xiao were considered highly contrary to the general rules of officials' friendship at the time, as Wang was the examiner when Wei submitted himself for imperial examinations, and Xiao passed the imperial examinations in the same year as Wei.)

== During Emperor Xizong's reign ==
Emperor Yizong died in 873 and was succeeded by his son Emperor Xizong. Pursuant to Emperor Yizong's final edict, Wei Baoheng served as regent during the period of mourning that Emperor Xizong held. However, his enemies were soon on to him, and because of their accusations, by fall 873, he was demoted to be the prefect of He Prefecture (賀州, in modern Hezhou, Guangxi), and then further demoted to be the magistrate of Chengmai County (澄邁, in modern Haikou, Hainan). He was then ordered to commit suicide, and his brother Wei Bao'ai was then also exiled.

== Notes and references ==
- Old Book of Tang, vol. 177.
- New Book of Tang, vol. 184.
- Zizhi Tongjian, vols. 251, 252.
