= Pang Xun =

Chinese rebel leader (died 869)

Pang Xun (龐勛; died October 14, 869) was the leader of a major rebellion, by soldiers from Xu Prefecture (徐州, in modern Xuzhou, Jiangsu), against the rule of Emperor Yizong of the Chinese Tang dynasty, from 868 to 869. He was eventually defeated by the Tang general Kang Chengxun, who was assisted by the Shatuo general Zhuye Chixin.

== Background of the Xu Prefecture soldiers ==
It is not known when Pang Xun was born, and little is known about his background other than that he was from Xu Prefecture and that his father Pang Juzhi (龐舉直) was still alive at the time of his eventual rebellion.

Xu Prefecture had a long-standing military tradition in the middle-to-late Tang dynasty, and had long been the capital of Wuning Circuit (武寧), which was created to control and cut off the communications between the then-rebellious Pinglu (平盧, then-headquartered in modern Tai'an, Shandong) and Zhangyi (彰義, headquartered in modern Zhumadian, Henan) Circuits. However, the soldiers from Xu Prefecture, particularly since the time of the military governor Wang Zhixing, had become arrogant and lax in discipline, such that there were frequent mutinies against military governors (jiedushi) that the imperial government sent to govern Wuning. For the imperial government, the last straw apparently came in 862, when the soldiers of the Yindao (銀刀, "silver sword") corps mutinied and expelled the imperially commissioned military governor Wen Zhang (溫璋). The imperial government commissioned the general Wang Shi as Wen's replacement. Wang, once he arrived at Xu Prefecture, had the soldiers that he brought from Zhongwu (忠武, headquartered in modern Xuchang, Henan) and Yicheng (義成, headquartered in modern Anyang, Henan) Circuits slaughter the Yindao soldiers, killing several thousands. Then-reigning Emperor Yizong then issued an edict rebuking the people of and disbanding Wuning Circuit. Xu Prefecture was put under the jurisdiction of Yanhai Circuit (兗海, headquartered in modern Jining, Shandong); of Wuning's other prefectures, Hao Prefecture (濠州, in modern Chuzhou, Anhui) was put under the jurisdiction of Huainan Circuit (淮南, headquartered in modern Yangzhou, Jiangsu); and Su (宿州, in modern Suzhou, Anhui) and Si (泗州, in modern Huai'an, Jiangsu) Prefectures were made into a new Susi Circuit, with its capital at Su Prefecture, but with a lesser status than before—not having a military governor, but only a governor (觀察使, Guanchashi).

In 863, after a disturbance where bandits intruded into Xu Prefecture and killed a number of officials before the attack was repelled by the prefect Cao Qing (曹慶), the headquarters of Susi Circuit was moved back to Xu Prefecture, and thereafter it was known as Xusi Circuit, governing Xu, Hao, Su, and Si Prefectures, thus restoring the prior Wuning territory, but still under the lesser status of governance by a governor, rather than a military governor.

In 864, with the southwestern parts of the Tang empire dealing with frequent Dali attacks, Emperor Yizong issued an edict recounting Xu Prefecture's military tradition and ordering the military prefect (團練使, Tuanlianshi) to recruit 3,000 men from Xu Prefecture to be stationed at Yong Prefecture (邕州, in modern Nanning, Guangxi) to guard against Dali attacks; the edict promised that once the troubles with Dali were over, the soldiers would be allowed to return home. Apparently, however, only 2,000 men were actually recruited, and of those, 800 were sent to Gui Prefecture (桂州, in modern Guilin, Guangxi), with a promise that they would be allowed to return home after three years. Pang was one of these men, and he served as an assistant to the commander, in charge of food supplies. At the end of the three years, the soldiers were hoping to return home, but the governor of Xusi, Cui Yanzeng (崔彥曾), under the advice of his officer Yin Kan (尹勘), decided to extend their stay at Gui Prefecture, because the expenses of recruiting new soldiers were considered too high. When this order reached Gui Prefecture, the Xu Prefecture soldiers were incensed.

== Initial uprising and journey back to Xu Prefecture ==
At that time, the governor of Gui District (桂管, headquartered at Gui Prefecture), Li Cong (李叢), had just left Gui District to take up his new position as governor of Hunan Circuit (湖南, headquartered in modern Changsha, Hunan), and the new governor of Gui had not arrived yet. The Xu Prefecture officers Xu Ji (許佶), Zhao Keli (趙可立), Yao Zhou (姚周), and Zhang Xingshi (張行實)—all of whom had previously been bandits but who had submitted to the government after being given officer commissions—took the opportunity to mutiny in fall 867. They killed their commander Wang Zhongfu (王仲甫) and supported Pang as their leader. The mutineers pillaged the armory, seizing weapons, and began their march home; as they went, they pillaged the territory, and the local governments were unable to resist. Emperor Yizong initially sent the high-level eunuch Zhang Jingsi (張敬思) to Pang and issued a pardon for Pang and his soldiers, permitting them to return to Xu Prefecture; in response, the Xu soldiers stopped their pillaging. When they reached Hunan Circuit, they turned in their weapons and armor. They then went on ships and headed east on the Yangtze River. Meanwhile, Emperor Yizong also ordered Cui Yanzeng to not cause the mutineers to be alarmed, so Cui issued repeated mildly-worded orders to Pang's soldiers, trying to comfort them. In response, Pang also submitted respectfully-worded reports to Cui.

While the Xu soldiers were en route down the Yangtze, however, they, particularly Xu Ji, considered their situation and concluded that their crimes were even greater than those of the Yindao—and that the only reasons why the imperial government issued a pardon were to prevent them from further pillaging or becoming bandits; they came to believe that they would be slaughtered upon return to Xu. They therefore used their wealth to equip themselves with armor and weapons. When they reached Huainan Circuit, the military governor of Huainan, Linghu Tao, provided them with food, even though Linghu's officer Li Xiang (李湘) pointed out that the Xu soldiers would eventually create further disturbances, as Linghu was only interested in preserving the peace for Huainan. Meanwhile, Pang recruited those Yindao soldiers who escaped the massacre and other bandits to add to the numbers of his soldiers.

On October 22, Pang reached Si Prefecture. The prefect Du Tao (杜慆) invited the soldiers to a feast and put on a play for entertainment. Before the start of the play, the leader of the actors, as was customary, was addressing the guests, when the Xu soldiers believed that he was parodying them, and they seized him and threatened to kill him. However, Du had prepared for this, and after this initial action, nothing else came of this.

On October 23, Pang reached Xucheng (徐城, near Si Prefecture). Pang and Xu Ji announced to the soldiers that it was their belief that once they arrived in Xu, the soldiers would be slaughtered or at least exiled. They announced that their plan was to attack and seize Xu Prefecture and force the imperial government to allow them to keep it. The soldiers largely agreed, and Pang executed 12 people who did not; he sent messengers with the heads of the 12 to report to Cui that those 12 had encouraged a rebellion, and that he was presenting their heads as sign of submission. When Pang's messengers reached Cui, he arrested and interrogated them and found out the truth. Meanwhile, Pang submitted another petition demanding that Cui relieve Yin Kan, as well as two other key officers, Du Zhang (杜璋), and Xu Xingjian (徐行儉) of their duties, and further demanding that the returning soldiers be allowed to be stationed separately from the main corps. Cui gathered his officers and discussed how to react to this; most officers, by this point, realized Pang's intentions and advocated attacking Pang. As a result, Cui had the officer Yuan Mi (元密) lead 3,000 men to attack Pang, and also ordered the Su and Si Prefectures to cut off Pang's paths as well.

News that Yuan was heading toward them soon reached Pang's soldiers. They quickly attacked Su Prefecture and captured it on November 4. They then gathered all of the wealth in the city and announced publicly that anyone could come and take them. Thereafter, the people in the surrounding area all swarmed to Su Prefecture. Pang's soldiers then seized the strong young men among these people and forced them to join their corps, executing anyone who refused. Several thousands were quickly added to their numbers this way. When Yuan arrived on November 6 and attacked, he could not quickly capture Su Prefecture, but the mutineers were also fearful of Yuan. They thus released Zhang Jingsi and abandoned Su on the night of November 6, intending to flee on Bian River. The morning of November 7, Yuan, realizing that the mutineers had fled, gave chase, without giving his soldiers a chance to eat. When they reached the mutineers, the mutineers used the ships that they had as defense and further utilized the swamp landscape to their advantage, surprising Yuan. Yuan and most of his soldiers were killed, and the survivors surrendered to Pang. The survivors informed Pang that Xu Prefectures had virtually no defenses, and Pang thereafter resolved to attack Xu Prefecture.

On November 8, Pang began a rapid march toward Xu Prefecture. Not until that night did Cui receive news that Yuan's army was annihilated, and he immediately sent urgent requests for reinforcements to the nearby circuits. On November 9, the Xu city gates were closed, and the circuit government rounded up the strong young men in the city to improve the defenses, but the city lacked the will to resist. Cui refused the calls for him to flee to Yanhai's capital Yan Prefecture (兗州), pointing out that it was his responsibility to die in the city. On November 10, Pang's soldiers arrived at Xu and comforted the people in the surrounding area, such that they joined the mutineers in large numbers as well. Within an hour, the outer city fell to the mutineers. Soon thereafter, the inner city fell as well. The mutineers put Cui under arrest and executed Yin, Du Zhang, and Xu Xingjian. It was said that 10,000 men joined the mutineer army that day.

== Resistance against imperial forces ==
Pang Xun took control of the circuit headquarters, took the title of acting military governor (留後, Liuhou), and initially sought imperial commission to formally do so. He tried to get Cui Yanzhen's assistant, in Cui's role as the military prefect, Wen Tinghao (溫庭皓), to draft a petition for him requesting imperial commission, but after Wen refused, his strategist Zhou Chong (周重) drafted a petition that was arrogantly worded, in which he threatened further military action against the imperial government if the imperial government did not commission him. Initially, though, the people in Xusi Circuit and the surrounding areas believed that the imperial government would be willing to commission Pang, and therefore, a large number of people in the surrounding origins, including agrarian rebels, went to Xu Prefecture and joined Xu's forces. Pang also sent his officer Liu Xingji (劉行及) to Hao Prefecture; Li Yuan (李圓) to Si Prefecture; and Liang Pi (梁丕) to Su Prefecture, to take control of those cities. Liu and Liang were able to do so, but Du Tao ambushed and resisted Li, and dug in on his defenses, ready to resist Pang. When the eunuch Kang Daowei (康道偉) arrived to try to placate Pang and his army, Pang made a demonstration of the strength of his force, and submitted another petition through Kang. Meanwhile, though, he attacked a number of neighboring cities, capturing a number of counties.

The imperial government, however, rejected Pang's overtures, as when the imperial edict arrived on December 2, all it declared were the faults of Cui and the eunuch monitor Zhang Daojin (張道謹) and that they would be demoted. Pang, disappointed, arrested the eunuch delivering the edict. Meanwhile, Emperor Yizong commissioned the imperial guards general Kang Chengxun to be the military governor of Yicheng Circuit, to oversee the operations against Pang, while commissioning two other imperial guard generals, Wang Yanquan (王晏權) and Dai Keshi (戴可師), to command two side armies to the north and south. At Kang's request, he was allowed to enlist the assistance of the Shatuo chieftain Zhuye Chixin, as well as those of the tribal chiefs of Tuyuhun, Tatar, and Qibi (契苾) tribes.

Meanwhile, Pang's forces put Si Prefecture under siege, nearly capturing it. Even though Du Shenquan the military governor of Zhenhai Circuit (鎮海, headquartered in modern Zhenjiang, Jiangsu) and Linghu Tao both sent forces to try to lift Si's siege, both circuits' armies (commanded by Zhai Xingyue (翟行約) and Li Xiang, respectively) were crushed and annihilated by Pang's forces. While Pang's forces were unable to capture Si Prefecture, they were able to capture a number of other prefectures around the region, including Chu (滁洲, in modern Chuzhou) and He (和州, in modern Chaohu, Anhui). Dai tried to recapture Duliang (都梁, in modern Huai'an), where the rebels had crushed Huainan forces, before lifting Si Prefecture's siege. The rebels at Duliang feigned surrender, and then ambushed Dai. Dai's army was also crushed, and Dai was killed. LInghu, concerned that the rebels would attack Huainan next, sent messengers to Pang, offering to request imperial commission for him. Pang therefore suspended further advancements on Huainan, but continued to siege Si Prefecture. To the north, Wang was also repeatedly defeated by the rebels, and was replaced by Cao Xiang (曹翔) the military governor of Taining Circuit (泰寧, i.e., the new name for Yanhai). He Quanhao the military governor of Weibo Circuit (魏博, headquartered in modern Handan, Hebei), which had been ruled semi-independently from the imperial government, also sent forces to aid Cao.

By this point, except for their inability to capture Si Prefecture, Pang's forces were still essentially running into no opposition in their campaigns, but in spring 869, Kang began approaching Xu Prefecture with about 70,000 men, and he stationed himself near the rebel stronghold at Liuzi (柳子, in modern Suzhou). Pang, faced with this huge imperial army and the fact that his own soldiers were spread thin on various campaigns, began to be fearful, and by this point the people were no longer joining him in droves. Further, his army's attacks on Hai (海州, in modern Lianyungang, Jiangsu) and Shou (壽州, in modern Lu'an, Anhui) were repelled by forces loyal to the imperial government, at heavy losses. Meanwhile, Zhuye distinguished himself in battle, and when the rebel officer Wang Hongli (王弘立), who was instrumental in their victory at Duliang, attacked one of the imperial forces' camps at Lutang (鹿塘, in modern Shangqiu, Henan), Zhuye's Shatuo soldiers struck back, inflicting heavy losses on Wang. Kang's main forces then attacked Liuzi, and when Yao Zhou tried to relieve Liuzi, Kang defeated him, and when he fled to Su Prefecture, Liang killed him due to their prior personal conflict.

== Declaration of independence ==
Hearing news of Liuzi's fall and Yao Zhou's death, Pang Xun, in fear, considered gathering all remaining troops for a decisive battle with Kang Chengxun. Zhou Chong suggested that, in order to make it clear the decisiveness of the confrontation, that he formally declare independence from the Tang regime. At the advice of Zhou and the sorcerer Cao Junzhang (曹君長), on May 19, 869, Pang executed Cui Yanzeng, Zhang Daojin, and a number of Cui's aides. He also cut off the limbs of Li Xiang and the Huainan eunuch monitor Guo Houben (郭厚本), who was captured with Li Xiang, and delivered the limbs to Kang's camp to show resolve. Pang issued a declaration stating that while he did not originally want to rebel against the Tang emperor, he was doing so at this point. A further conscription drive of the men of Xu Prefecture was carried out, gathering some 30,000 men. Xu Ji and the others offered the titles of General Tiance (天冊將軍) and "Brilliance Prince of the Congregation" (大會明王) to Pang, although Pang only accepted the General Tiance title at that time.

Pang, leaving Xu and his father Pang Juzhi in charge at Xu Prefecture, departed Xu Prefecture on May 23, first attacking the Weibo troops, which had been attacking the rebel-controlled Feng County, Jiangsu, catching Weibo forces by surprise. He crushed the Weibo forces, and Taining forces, hearing of Weibo forces' defeat, also withdrew. Pang gathered the food that the Weibo and Taining forces left, and then prepared for a major attack on Kang's main forces. He departed Feng on June 3, and called on the other rebel forces in the vicinity to join him for an attack on Kang at Liuzi on June 12. However, some Huainan soldiers whom he had captured escaped and informed Kang of Pang's plans. When the rebels from Xiangcheng (襄城, in modern Xuchang, Henan) arrived first, Kang defeated them, and when Pang subsequently arrived, Pang's own forces collapsed without an engagement, and Kang's forces subsequently routed them. Pang fled back to Xu Prefecture. Meanwhile, Ma Ju (馬舉), who had recently replaced Linghu Tao as the military governor of Huainan, attacked the rebels sieging Si Prefecture, crushing them and lifting the siege on Si. The rebels previously sieging Si Prefecture, under Wu Jiong (吳迥), withdrew to Hao Prefecture, and Ma put it under siege.

Meanwhile, Kang advanced on Su Prefecture, which was then defended by the rebel officers Zhang Xuanren (張玄稔), Zhang Ru (張儒), and Zhang Shi (張實), and put it under siege. He could not capture it quickly, however, and Zhang Shi sent a petition to Pang, suggesting that Pang should make a surprise attack on Song (宋州, in modern Shangqiu) and Bo (亳州, in modern Bozhou, Anhui) Prefectures, so that Kang would lift the siege on Su Prefecture. Kang, who had been concerned that Cao Xiang had since captured Feng County and was approaching Xu Prefecture, agreed.

== Death ==
Unknown to Pang Xun, Zhang Xuanren had not joined him willingly, and soon, after persuading his direct subordinates to join him, made overtures to Kang Chengxun, offering to surrender Su Prefecture to Kang. On October 11, while Zhang Ru and Zhang Shi were drinking together, Zhang Xuanren had them surrounded, proclaimed that Pang had already died, and ordered that Zhang Ru and Zhang Shi be killed. The soldiers rushed in and killed Zhang Ru and Zhang Shi. Zhang Xuanren took over sole control of the city, and the next day opened the city gates and surrendered it to Kang. Kang immediately commissioned him as an imperial officer. Subsequently, under Zhang Xuanren's suggestion, Zhang Xuanren took 30,000 of his own soldiers, along with 500 imperial army soldiers, pretended to be leading a rebel army that was fleeing Su Prefecture after the imperial forces had captured it and headed for the rebel base at Fuli (苻離), near Su Prefecture. When Fuli welcomed him, he killed the rebel commanders there and took it over, and then headed toward Xu Prefecture, preparing to use the same tactics to capture it. When he reached it, however, Pang Juzhi and Xu Ji had already received the news, and therefore put up defenses.

On October 15, Zhang reached Xu Prefecture and surrounded it, but did not immediately attack it; rather, he announced to the defenders that the imperial government would not punish anyone who surrendered. The rebel soldiers began to surrender in droves. Pang Juzhi and Xu initially withdrew within into the inner city, but finding their own soldiers' morale failing, tried to fight out of the encirclement. Zhang intercepted and killed them. Several thousands of the rebels' family members were killed, and the imperial forces soon controlled the city.

Meanwhile, Kang pursued Pang, who had made a surprise attack on Song Prefecture, capturing the southern city, but with Song's prefect Zheng Chuchong (鄭處沖) defending the northern city, Pang abandoned further attempts to capture it and continued to head west, toward Bo Prefecture. By this point, though, the Shatuo forces under Zhuye Chixin had already arrived. Pang tried to head toward back to Xu Prefecture, but when he reached Qi County (蘄縣, in modern Suzhou), the local militia leader Zhang Gun (張袞) lifted the floating bridge to stop him from crossing the Huan River (渙水). The imperial forces then attacked and killed a large number of rebel soldiers, with the rest throwing themselves into the river and largely drowning. Pang died in the battle as well. Wu Jiong, for some time, held out at Hao Prefecture, but Hao Prefecture fell after another month, ending the rebellion.

== In fiction ==
Pang Xun is a character in the 1972 Hong Kong martial arts film Trilogy of Swordsmanship where he was portrayed by Lo Lieh.

== Notes and references ==
- New Book of Tang, vol. 148.
- Zizhi Tongjian, vol. 251.
