= Shatuo =

Medieval Turkic tribe in China

- Chinese: 沙陀
Transcriptions
Standard Mandarin
- Hanyu Pinyin: Shātuó
- Wade–Giles: Sha^{1}-tʻo^{2}
- IPA: /ʂä⁵⁵ tʰwɔ³⁵/
Middle Chinese
- Middle Chinese: /ʃˠa dɑ/

Shatuo Turks
- Chinese: 沙陀突厥
Transcriptions
Standard Mandarin
- Hanyu Pinyin: Shātuó Tūjué
- Wade–Giles: Sha^{1}-tʻo^{2} Tʻu^{1}-chüeh^{2}
- IPA: /ʂä⁵⁵ tʰwɔ³⁵ tʰu⁵⁵ t͡ɕɥɛ³⁵/
Middle Chinese
- Middle Chinese: /ʃˠa dɑ tʰuət̚ kɨut̚/

The Shatuo, or the Shatuo Turks (Chinese: 沙陀突厥; pinyin: Shātuó Tūjué; also transcribed as Sha-t'o, Sanskrit Sart) were a Turkic tribe that heavily influenced northern Chinese politics from the late ninth century through the tenth century. They are noted for founding three, Later Tang, Later Jin, and Later Han, of the five dynasties and one, Northern Han, of the ten kingdoms during the Five Dynasties and Ten Kingdoms period. The Northern Han would later be conquered by the Song dynasty. Sometime before the 12th century, the Shatuo disappeared as a distinct ethnic group, many of them having become acculturated and assimilating into the general population around them.

== Origins ==
=== Chuyue ===
The Shatuo tribe were descended mainly from the Western Turkic Chuyue tribe, who in turn belonged to a group of four Chuy tribes, collectively known as Yueban. The Yueban state survived to the end of the 480s when its independence was destroyed by the Tiele people. After the fall of the state, the people of Yueban formed four tribes - Chuyue, Chumi, Chumuhun and Chuban. These tribes became major players in the later First Turkic Khaganate and thereafter. The Chuyue and Chumi did not belong to the dominant Onoq (Ten Arrows) Union, while Chumukun and Chuban did.

=== Tiele ===
Other sources claim the Shatuo originated from the Tiele. The epitaph of Shatuo Li Keyong, a late-Tang military commissioner (jiedushi), states that his clan's progenitor was "Yidu, Lord of the Xueyantuo state, an unrivaled general" (益度、薛延陀國君、無敵將軍), Xueyantuo was a Tiele tribe. Other Chinese chroniclers traced the Shatuo's origins to a Tiele chief named *Bayar (拔也 Baye) ~ *Bayïrku (拔也古 Bayegu) The Song historian Ouyang Xiu rejected the Bayïrku origin of Shatuo; he pointed out that the Bayïrku were contemporaries, not primordial ancestors, of the Shatuo's reigning clan Zhuxie, and that this Western Turkic kin-group adopted Shatuo as their tribal name and Zhuxie as surname after their chief Jinzhong (盡忠; lit. "Loyal to the Utmost") had moved into Beiting Protectorate, in Tang Dezong's time (r. 780 - 804).

=== Shatuo ===
The Chuyue tribe members who remained in the Western Turkic Kaganate, under Onoq leadership, occupied territory east of the lake Barkul, and were called, in Chinese, Shatuo (literally "sandy slope" or "gravel sands", i.e. desert). Shatuoji was also the name of a desert in northern Xinjiang.

The Shatuo consisted of three sub-tribes: Chuyue (處月), Suoge (娑葛), and Anqing (安慶), the last of whom were of Sogdian origins. The Shatuo participated in wars on behalf of the Tang dynasty, including against other Turkic people like the Uyghur khaganate, which granted their leaders various titles and rewards. After a defeat of the Chuy by Tibetans in 808, the Chuy Shatuo branch asked China for protection, and moved into Inner China. After aiding in the suppression of the Huang Chao uprising in 875–883, and establishing three out of five short-lived dynasties during the Five Dynasties and Ten Kingdoms period (907-960), their number in China fell down to between 50 and 100 thousand.

A detailed analysis of the term Shatuo (Sanskrit Sart) is given by Chjan Si-man. Their social and economic life was studied by W. Eberhard. In "Tanghuyao" the Shato tamga is depicted as

Shatuo nobles established the Later Tang dynasty of China (923-956). During the Mongol period the Shatuo fell under the Chagatai Khanate, and after its demise remained in its remnant in Zhetysu and northern Tian Shan.

The Shatuo received tribute from the Tatar people from north of the Ordos in 966, while they were vassals of the Khitan Emperor.

== History ==
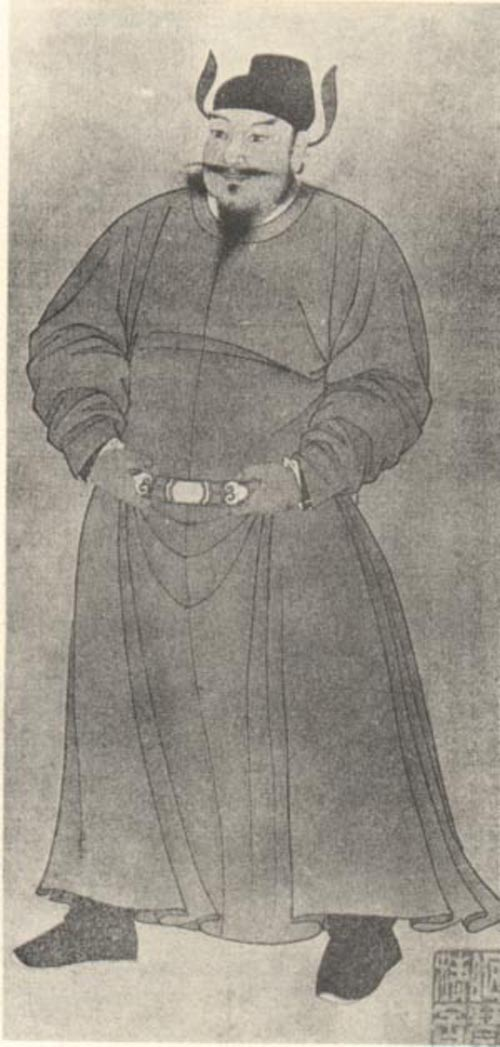
Li Keyong (856-908), Shatuo warlord in the late Tang dynasty

=== Early Shatuo (7-8th century) ===
The early Shatuo were originally called the Turks of Shatuo circuit (lit. Shatuo Turks/Shatuo Tujue). Occasional references were made to the three tribes of the Shatuo: Shatuo, Anqing, and Yinge. The Shatuo population was never large but their warriors had a reputation for being brave and aggressive as well as proficient in siege warfare and archery. They participated in Emperor Taizong of Tang's campaigns against Goryeo in the 640s and performed with distinction despite their ultimate failure. At the same time the Shatuo also came into conflict with neighboring tribes, leading them to further depend on the Tang dynasty for support. In 702, Shatuo Jinshan, ancestor of the future late Tang warlord Li Keyong, started sending tribute to the Tang court. In 714, Jinshan was invited to Chang'an where Emperor Xuanzong of Tang hosted a banquet for him. During the An Lushan rebellion in the 750s, the Shatuo provided significant military aid to the Tang alongside the Uyghur Khaganate. Yao Runeng (姚如能) mentioned in the 9th-century Deeds of An Lushan, two separate tribes Shatuo 沙陀 and Zhuye (朱耶) ~ Zhuxie 朱邪, among the non-Chinese tribes in the He and Long regions under Turko-Khotanese loyalist superintendent Geshu Han (哥舒翰, d. 757).

=== Tang subjects (9th century) ===
In 808, 30,000 Shatuo under Zhuye Jinzhong defected from the Tibetans to Tang China and the Tibetans punished them by killing Zhuye Jinzhong as they were chasing them. The Uyghurs also fought against an alliance of Shatuo and Tibetans at Beshbalik.

In 809, the Tang resettled several Shatuo tribes in Hedong (modern northern Shanxi), also called Jin based on the region's ancient name. The Shatuo there were semi-pastoralists who traded in horse, sheep, and cattle. However their way of life gradually changed over the 9th century as they became more settled and intermarried with border people and the Han Chinese. Their population also increased. In the early 9th century, reports of 6,000-7,000 Shatuo tents point toward a population of just 30,000 people, including women and children. By the end of the 9th century, the Shatuo had 50,000-60,000 male warriors.

In 821, Zhuye Zhiyi, the great-grandfather of Li Keyong, led a failed attack on the rebellious jiedushi circuit of Chengde.

The Shatuo Turks under Zhuye Chixin (Li Guochang) served the Tang dynasty in fighting against their fellow Turkic people in the Uyghur Khaganate. In 839, when the Uyghur khaganate (Huigu) general Jueluowu (掘羅勿) rose against the rule of then-reigning Zhangxin Khan, he elicited the help from Zhuye Chixin by giving Zhuye 300 horses, and together, they defeated Zhangxin Khan, who then committed suicide, precipitating the subsequent collapse of the Uyghur Khaganate. In the next few years, when Uyghur Khaganate remnants tried to raid Tang borders, the Shatuo participated extensively in counterattacking the Uyghur Khaganate with other tribes loyal to Tang. In 843, Zhuye Chixin, under the command of the Han Chinese officer Shi Xiong with Tuyuhun, Tangut and Han Chinese troops, participated in a raid against the Uyghur khaganate that led to the slaughter of Uyghur forces at Shahu mountain.

The Shatuo ruling family started using Zhuye as their surname. Zhuye Chixin (d. 888) abandoned it after he was bestowed the name Li Guochang by the Tang emperor for his role in the suppression of Pang Xun's rebel general, Wang Hongli, in 869. Guochang later upset the Tang court by slaying the governor of Datong, Duan Wenchu, in 872. In 880, tensions came to a head when Guochang's forces suffered a defeat to Tang mercenaries, costing him a loss of 17,000 men. This led the Shatuo to turn north to their "Tartar" friends for support.

=== Li Keyong ===
The son of Li Guochang, Li Keyong, was a very capable warrior. He was said to be capable of "hitting twin flying ducks from a reclining position" and was called the "Dragon with a Single Eye" because he had an eye that was noticeably larger than the other. He led Shatuo forces to defeat Huang Chao, who had rebelled against the Tang and taken Chang'an in 881. The Shatuo victory in 883 forced Huang Chao to retreat from Chang'an. The then 28-year old Keyong, in charge of the Shatuo after his father's retirement, celebrated in Chang'an the following year. According to Sima Guang, "Keyong’s contribution to the suppression of Huang Chao was arguably second to none." Despite arguably saving the Tang dynasty, the Shatuo sacked Chang'an in 885. Keyong was appointed prefect of Daizhou and governor of Yanmen. From there, he expanded his territory to Jinyang, Zezhou, and Liaozhou. In 890, the Shatuo took Zhaoyi.

Jinyang became the Shatuo capital. It was strategically located between two hills more akin to mountains, rising as high as a thousand meters. Combined with craters and dry riverbeds, the location made attacks from the southeast and northwest hazardous. In the west, the Yellow River made any maneuver costly in time and materiel. Jinyang itself was a fortress city with a wall spanning 20 km with sufficient provisions to last a year. It was seen as "the northern door to the empire" at the time.

== Five Dynasties ==
Li Cunxu (885-926), Emperor Zhuangzong of Later Tang

The Tang dynasty fell in 907 and was replaced by the Later Liang. The Shatuo had their own principality Jin (Later Tang precursor) under the Tang dynasty, in the area now known as Shanxi, which was granted to them as a fief in 883 by the Tang emperors, and survived the fall of the Tang dynasty in 907. The Tang dynasty emperor's had granted the Shatuo Zhuye chieftain Li Keyong the imperial surname of Li and title Prince of Jin, adopting him into the imperial family. They had tense relations with the Later Liang, and cultivated good relations with the emerging Khitan power to the north.

=== Later Tang ===
The son of Li Keyong, Li Cunxu, succeeded in destroying the Later Liang in 923, declaring himself the emperor of the “Restored Tang”, officially known as the Later Tang, using the fact that his family was granted the imperial Li surname of the Tang dynasty and a princely title to declare themselves legitimate Tang dynasty emperors. In line with claims of restoring the Tang, Li moved the capital from Kaifeng back to Luoyang, where it had been during the Tang dynasty. The Later Tang controlled more territory than the Later Liang, including the Beijing area, the surrounding Sixteen Prefectures, Shanxi and Shaanxi Province.

This was the first of three short-lived Shatuo dynasties. The last Later Tang Emperor was a Han Chinese, Li Congke, originally surnamed Wang, who was adopted by the Shatuo Later Tang Emperor Li Siyuan, granted the imperial surname Li and made the Prince of Lu.

=== Later Jin ===
The Later Tang was brought to an end in 936 when Shi Jingtang (posthumously known as Gaozu of Later Jin), also a Shatuo, successfully rebelled against the Han Chinese Later Tang emperor Li Congke and established the Later Jin dynasty. Shi moved the capital back to Kaifeng, then called Bian. The Later Jin controlled essentially the same territory as the Later Tang except the strategic Sixteen Prefectures area, which had been ceded to the expanding Liao Empire established by the Khitans.

Later historians would denigrate the Later Jin as a puppet regime of the powerful Liao to the north. When Shi's successor did defy the Liao, a Khitan invasion resulted in the end of the dynasty in 946.

=== Later Han and Northern Han ===
The death of the Khitan emperor on his return from the raid on the Later Jin left a power vacuum that was filled by Liu Zhiyuan, another Shatuo who founded the Later Han in 947. The capital was at Bian (Kaifeng) and the state held the same territories as its predecessor. Liu died after a single year of reign and was succeeded by his teenage son, in turn unable to reign for more than two years, when this very short-lived dynasty was ended by the Later Zhou. The remnants of the Later Han returned to the traditional Shatuo Turk stronghold of Shanxi and established the Northern Han Kingdom. The Last Northern Han Emperor, Liu Jiyuan was originally surnamed He but was adopted by his maternal grandfather, the Northern Han Emperor Liu Chong and granted the imperial surname Liu. Liu Jiyuan granted the imperial surname to the Han Chinese general Yang Ye and adopted him as a brother. Under the protection of the Khitan Liao dynasty, the tiny kingdom survived until 979 when it was finally incorporated into the Song dynasty.

== Song dynasty ==
Shatuo Turks that remained on the steppes were eventually absorbed into various Mongolic or Turkic tribes. From the 10th to 13th centuries, Shatuo remnants possibly joined Tatar confederation in the territory of the modern Mongolia, and became known as Ongud or White Tatars branch of the Tatars.

== Physical appearance ==
Contemporary records of the Shatuo describes some Shatuo men as having deep set eyes and whiskers as well as lithe bodies and a light complexion. Centuries later, the Mongols referred to the descendants of the Shatuo as "White Tartars."

== Religion ==
The early Shatuo seem to have practiced some aspects of Manichaeism alongside their reverence for spirits and divination. They also believed in a "Heavenly God" or "Sky God" like other nomadic peoples. The Shatuo were also influenced by Buddhism in their sculptural artworks.

== Surnames of Shatuo ==
- Li (李)
- Zhuye (朱耶/朱邪)
- Zhu (朱)
- Sha-Jin (沙金)
- Sha (沙)*
- Liu (劉)*

== See also ==
- History of China

== Sources ==
- Chavannes, Édouard (1900), Documents sur les Tou-kiue (Turcs) occidentaux. Paris, Librairie d’Amérique et d’Orient. Reprint: Taipei. Cheng Wen Publishing Co. 1969.
- Davis, Richard L. (2014), From Warhorses to Ploughshares: The Later Tang Reign of Emperor Mingzong, Hong Kong University Press
- Findley, Carter Vaughn, The Turks in World History. Oxford University Press, (2005). ISBN 0-19-516770-8; 0-19-517726-6 (pbk.)
- Mote, F.W.: Imperial China: 900–1800, Harvard University Press, 1999
- Zuev Yu.A., "Se-Yanto Kaganate And Kimeks (Türkic ethnogeography of the Central Asia in the middle of 7th century)", Shygys, 2004, No 1, pp. 11–21, No 2, pp. 3–26, Oriental Studies Institute, Almaty (In Russian)
- Chinaknowledge: 5 DYNASTIES & 10 STATES
- Shatuo
- This article incorporates text from Journal of the China Branch of the Royal Asiatic Society for the year ..., Volumes 30-31, by Royal Asiatic Society of Great Britain and Ireland. China Branch, a publication from 1897, now in the public domain in the United States.
- Davis, Richard L. (2016), Fire and Ice: Li Cunxu and the Founding of the Later Tang
