= Jingwu (disambiguation) =

Jingwu is one of the seven towns in Xiqing District, Tianjin, China.

Jingwu may also refer to:

- Jingwu railway station, a railway station on the Taiwan Railways Administration Taichung line
- Jingwu Village (旌坞村), Baima, Zhejiang Province, China
- Wang Jingwu (d. 889), a warlord late in the Chinese dynasty Tang Dynasty
- Zhang Jingwu (1906–1971), a general of the People's Republic of China
- Paul Ching Wu Chu (朱經武; born 1941), a Chinese-American physicist

== See also ==
- Jing Wu
- Chin Woo Athletic Association, an international martial arts organisation
