= Aiyu (disambiguation) =

Aiyu is another name for Ficus pumila var. awkeotsang. It may also refer to:

- Aiyu Photography Club
- Aiyu jelly, a jelly popular in Taiwan and Singapore
