= Wiebesia =

Scientific classification
- Kingdom: Animalia
- Phylum: Arthropoda
- Class: Insecta
- Order: Hymenoptera
- Family: Agaonidae
- Genus: Wiebesia; Boucek, 1988

Genus of wasps

Wiebesia is a genus in the family Agaonidae (fig wasps). The scientific name of this genus was first published in 1988 by Boucek.

Pollinating fig wasps are specific to specific figs. Ficus pumila var. awkeotsang, the source of aiyu jelly, is pollinated by Wiebesia pumilae.

== Types ==
The genus Wiebesia includes the following species:

- Wiebesia boldinghi (Grandi, 1916)
- Wiebesia callida (Grandi, 1927)
- Wiebesia clavata (Wiebes, 1993)
- Wiebesia contubernalis (Grandi, 1927)
- Wiebesia corneri (Wiebes, 1993)
- Wiebesia flava (Wiebes, 1993)
- Wiebesia gomberti (Grandi, 1928)
- Wiebesia Isabella (Wiebes, 1993)
- Wiebesia macula (Wiebes, 1993)
- Wiebesia minuta (Wiebes, 1993)
- Wiebesia nuda (Wiebes, 1993)
- Wiebesia partita (Boucek, 1988)
- Wiebesia planocrea (Wiebes, 1993)
- Wiebesia pumilae (Hill, 1967)
- Wiebesia punctatae (Wiebes, 1993)
- Wiebesia sensillata (Wiebes, 1993)
- Wiebesia Vechti (Wiebes, 1993)
- Wiebesia vidua (Wiebes, 1980)
