= Seosan Jeong clan =

Korean clan from South Chungcheong Province

- Country: Korea
- Current region: Seosan
- Founder: Chŏng Ŭngch'ung
- Connected members: Chŏng Inhong; Jeong Jungkook; Jeong Yun Ho

The Seosan Jeong clan (Korean: 서산 정씨; Hanja: 瑞山鄭氏) is a Korean clans. Their Bon-gwan was in Seosan, South Chungcheong Province. According to the South Korean census held in 2000, the number of Seosan Jeong clan was 15362. Their founder was Chŏng Ŭngch'ung living in Pujiang County, Zhejiang who was a government officer in Song dynasty. Chŏng Ŭngch'ung used to be a Yuanwailang (員外郎/员外郎). Then, he settled in Seosan of Goryeo after Song dynasty declined.

== See also ==
- Korean clan names of foreign origin
