= Climbing fig =

Climbing fig is a common name for several plants in the genus Ficus and may refer to:

- Ficus pantoniana, a vine from Australia
- Ficus pumila, a vine from East Asia

== See also ==
- Climbing fig tofu
