= Zhongkuilu =

Zhongkuilu (中饋錄,中馈录, Zhōngkuìlù) may refer to several Chinese household culinary works:

- Wushi Zhongkuilu (吳氏中饋錄): written by a Madame Wu in Song dynasty China and known also as its full name, Song Pujiang Wushi Zhoungkuilu(宋浦江吳氏中饋錄)
- Zhongkuilu (Peng Songyu): written by Peng Songyu (彭崧毓) during the Qing dynasty
- Zhongkuilu (Zeng Yi): written by Zeng Yi (曾懿) during the Qing dynasty
