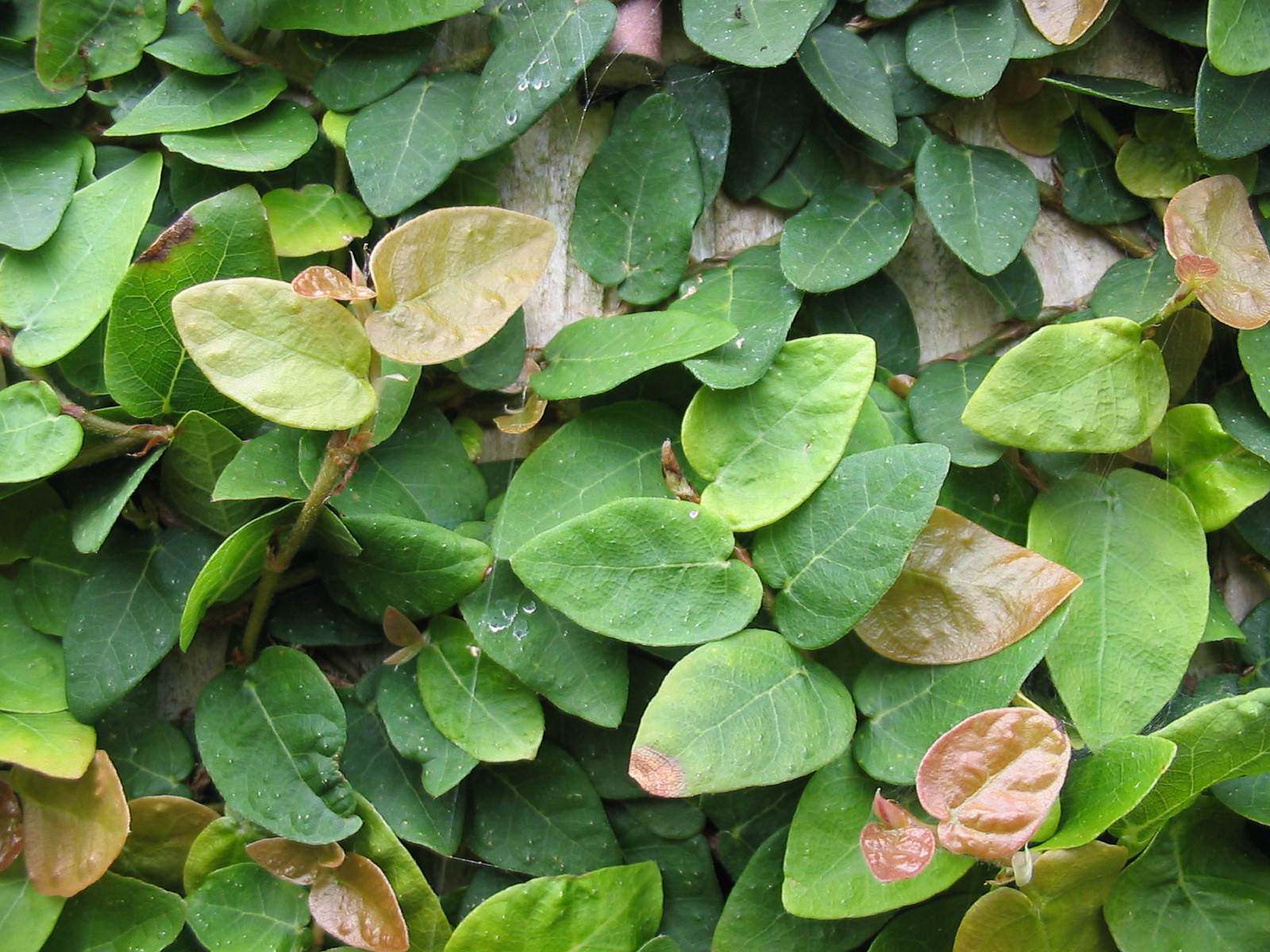
- F. pumila foliage

Scientific classification
- Kingdom: Plantae
- Clade: Tracheophytes
- Clade: Angiosperms
- Clade: Eudicots
- Clade: Rosids
- Order: Rosales
- Family: Moraceae
- Tribe: Ficeae
- Genus: Ficus
- Subgenus: F. subg. Synoecia
- Species: F. pumila

Binomial name
- Ficus pumila L. 1753 not Thunb. 1786

Synonyms
- List: Ficus hanceana Maxim.; Ficus longipedicellata H.Perrier; Ficus pumila var. lutchuensis Koidz.; Ficus repens var. lutchuensis ^{Koidz.}; Ficus scandens Lam.; Ficus stipulata Thunb. 1786; Ficus stipulata Lem. 1843; Ficus vestita Desf.; Plagiostigma pumila Zucc.; Plagiostigma stipulata Zucc.; Tenorea heterophylla Gasp.; Urostigma scandens (Lam.) Liebm.; Varinga repens Raf.

= Ficus pumila =

Creeping fig

Species of climbing fig

Ficus pumila, commonly known as the creeping fig or climbing fig, is a species of flowering plant in the mulberry family, native to East Asia (southern China, southern Japan,southern Korea, Vietnam) and naturalised in parts of the southeastern and south-central United States. It is also found in cultivation as a houseplant. The Latin specific epithet pumila means "dwarf", and refers to the very small leaves of the plant.

== Description ==
Ficus pumila is a woody evergreen liana, growing to 2.5–12 m (8–39 ft) tall. The juvenile foliage is much smaller and thinner than mature leaves produced as the plant ages. The leaves are oval, cordate, asymmetrical, with opposite veins. It is creeping or can behave like a liana and also climb trees, rocks, etc. up to 4 m in height or more. The aerial roots secrete a translucent latex that hardens on drying, allowing the stems to adhere to their support.

It is pollinated by the fig wasp Wiebesia pumilae (syn. Blastophaga pumilae), and is fed upon by larvae of the butterfly Marpesia petreus.

== Cultivation ==
As the common name, "creeping fig" indicates, the plant has a creeping/vining habit and is often used in gardens and landscapes where it covers the ground and climbs up trees and walls. It is hardy down to 1 °C (34 °F) and does not tolerate frost. Therefore, in temperate regions it is often seen as a houseplant. It is fast-growing and requires little in the way of care. It can be invasive when environmental conditions are favorable. Its secondary roots or tendrils can cause structural damage to certain buildings with fragile mortar or structures made of fragile materials.

It has gained the Royal Horticultural Society's Award of Garden Merit.

== Varieties and cultivars ==
- Ficus pumila var. awkeotsang — awkeotsang creeping fig
- Ficus pumila var. quercifolia — oak leaf creeping fig
- Ficus pumila 'Curly' — curly creeping fig; crinkled leaf form
- Ficus pumila 'Variegata' and Ficus pumila 'Snowflake' — variegated creeping fig; variegated foliage
- Ficus pumila 'Minima' – features smaller, heart-shaped leaves

== Cuisine ==
The fruit of Ficus pumila var. awkeotsang is used in cuisine. In Taiwan, its fruit is turned inside out and dried. The seeds are scraped off and a gel is extracted from their surface with water and allowed to set and form a jelly known in Taiwan as aiyu jelly (or aiyuzi 愛玉子) and in Singapore as ice jelly (文頭雪).

== Toxicity ==
Like other plant species in the family Moraceae, contact with the milky sap of Ficus pumila can cause phytophotodermatitis, a potentially serious skin inflammation. Although the plant is not poisonous per se, F. pumila is listed in the FDA Database of Poisonous Plants.

== Gallery ==
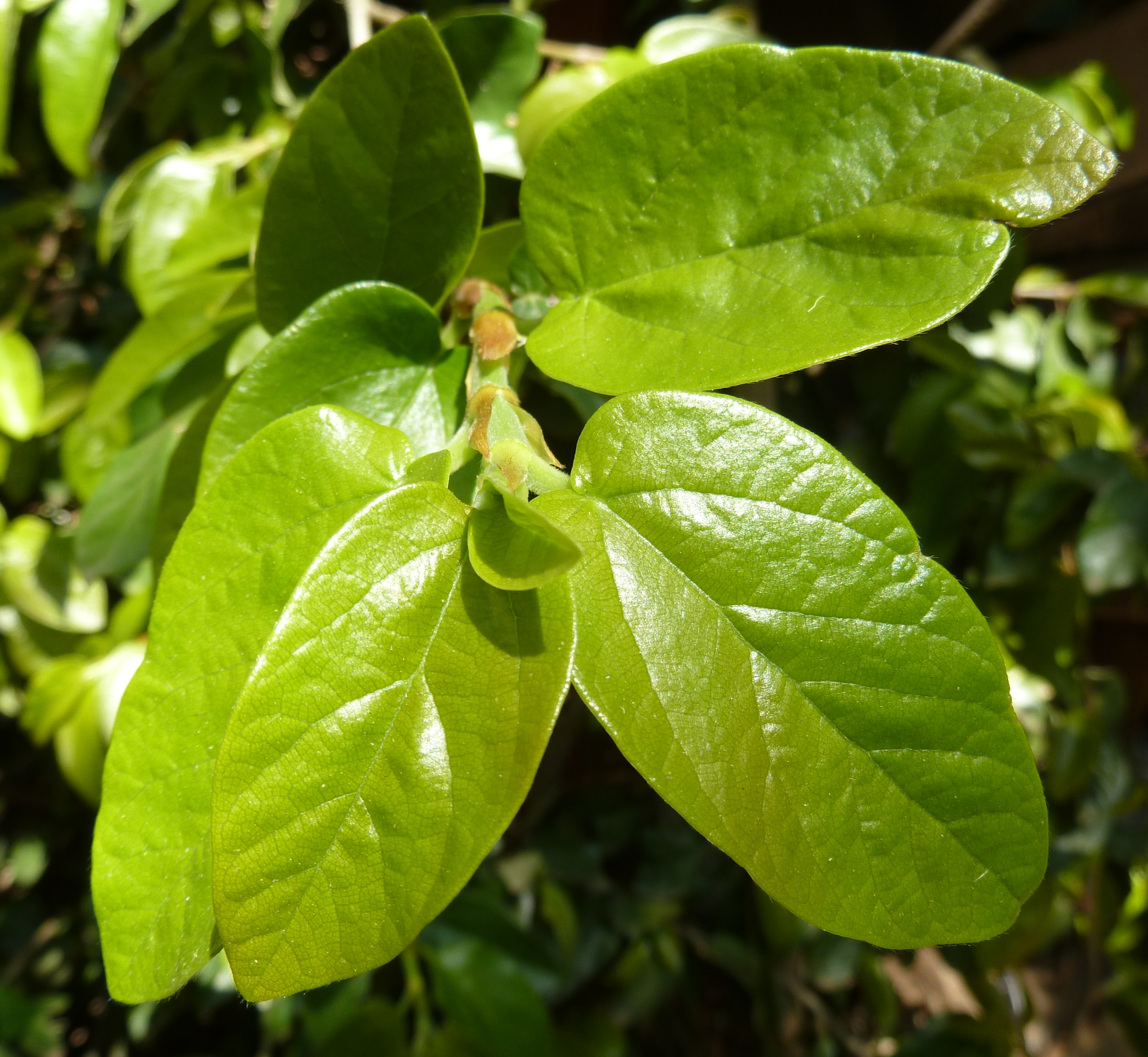
Close-up of the leaves and brown stipules

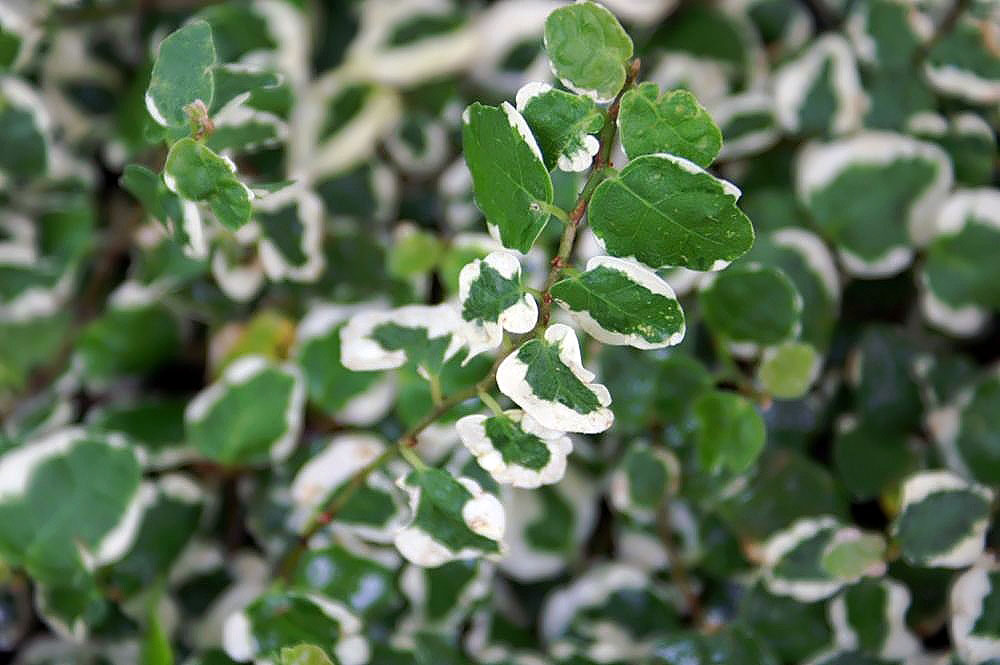
Variegated leaves

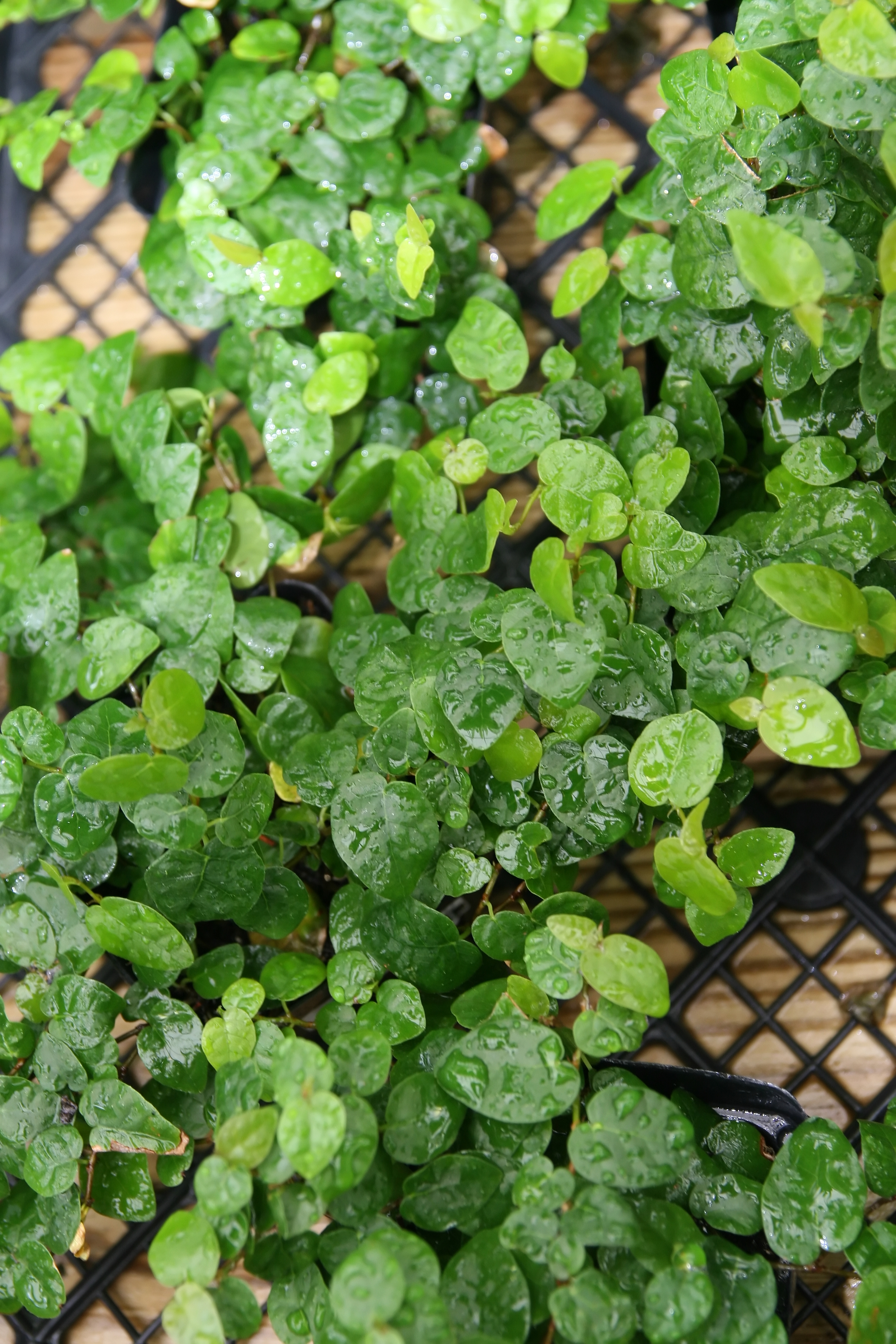
'Minima' variety with smaller, crinkly leaves

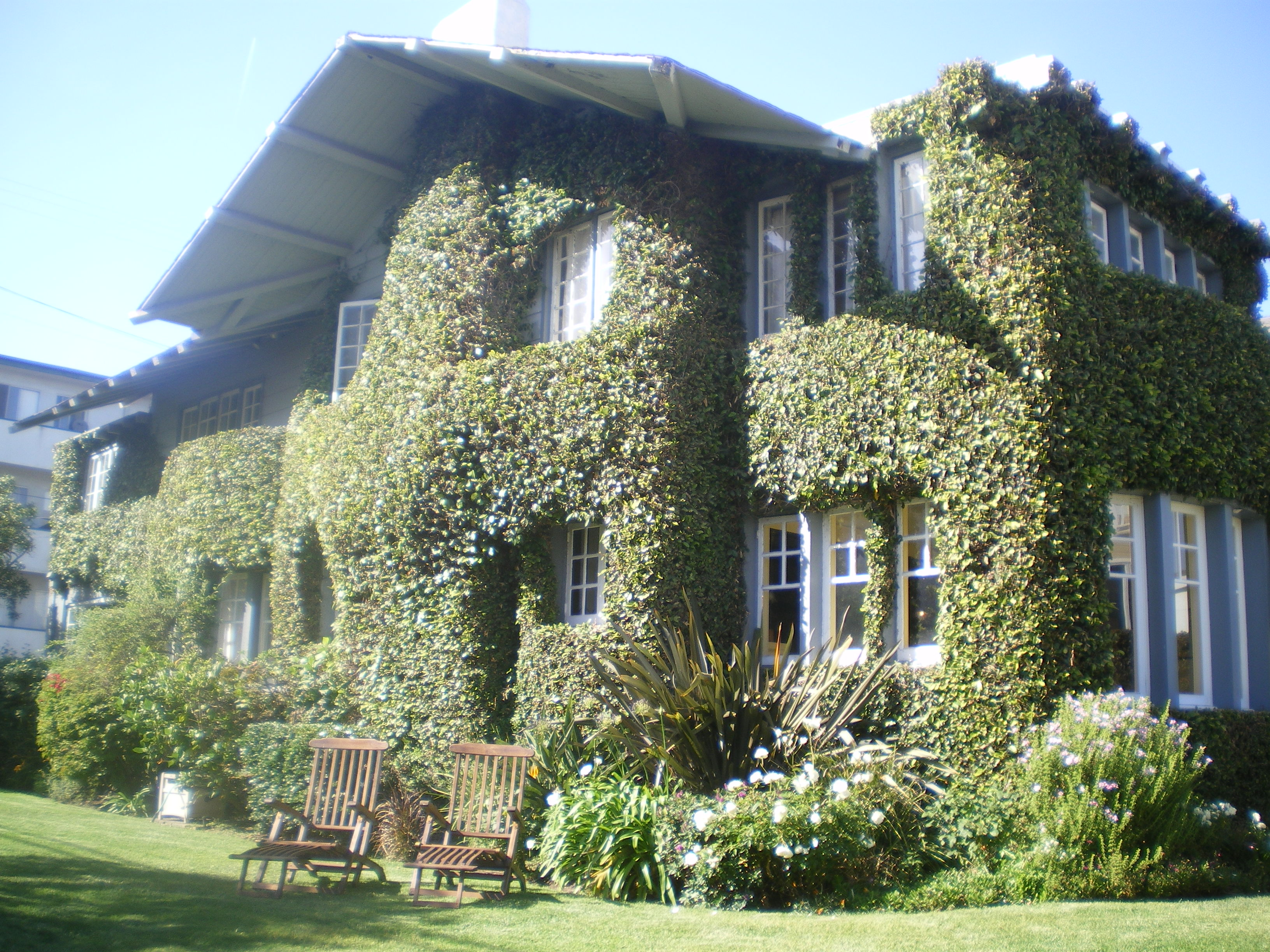
Growing on Warren Wilson Beach House in Venice, CA

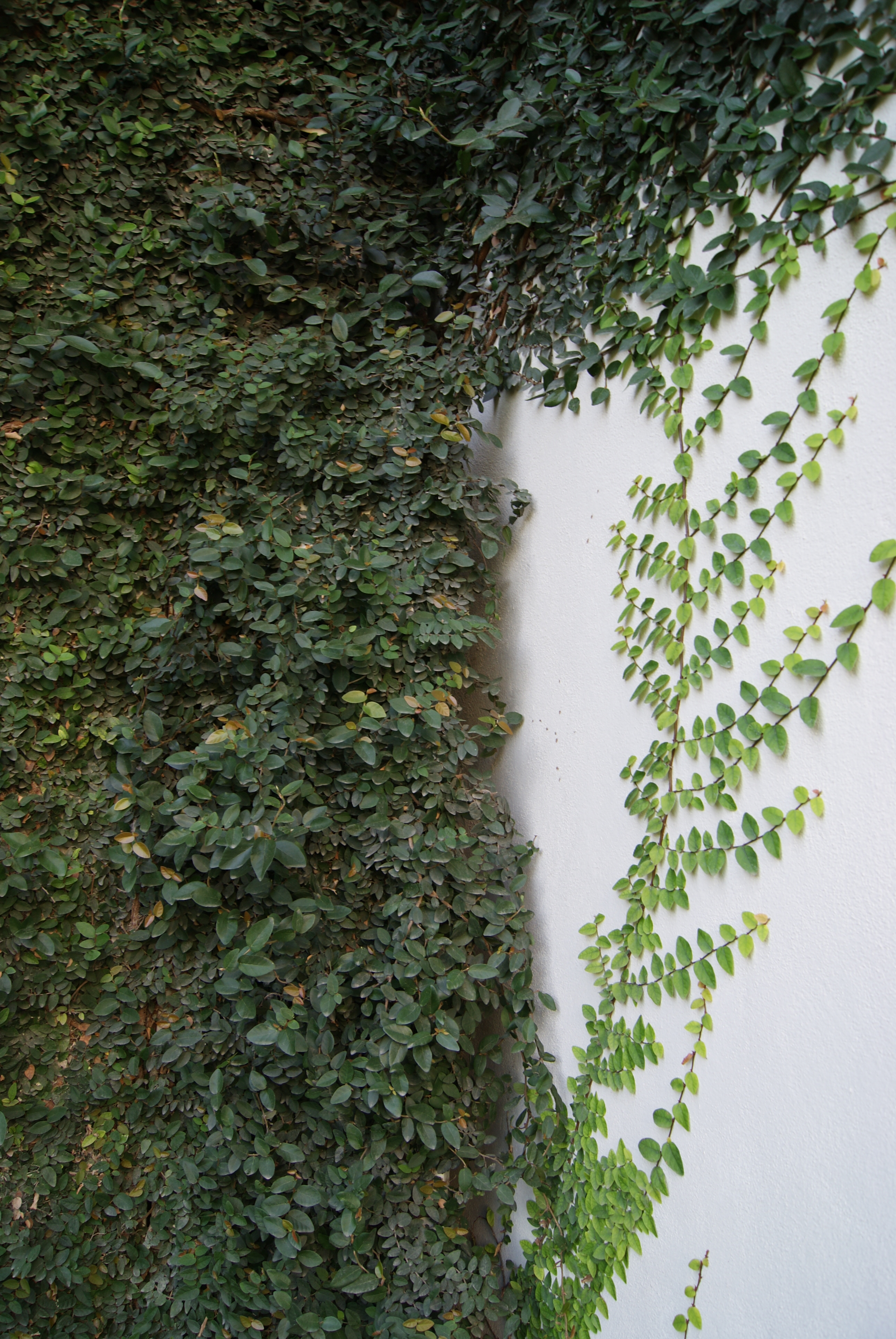
Habit on a wall

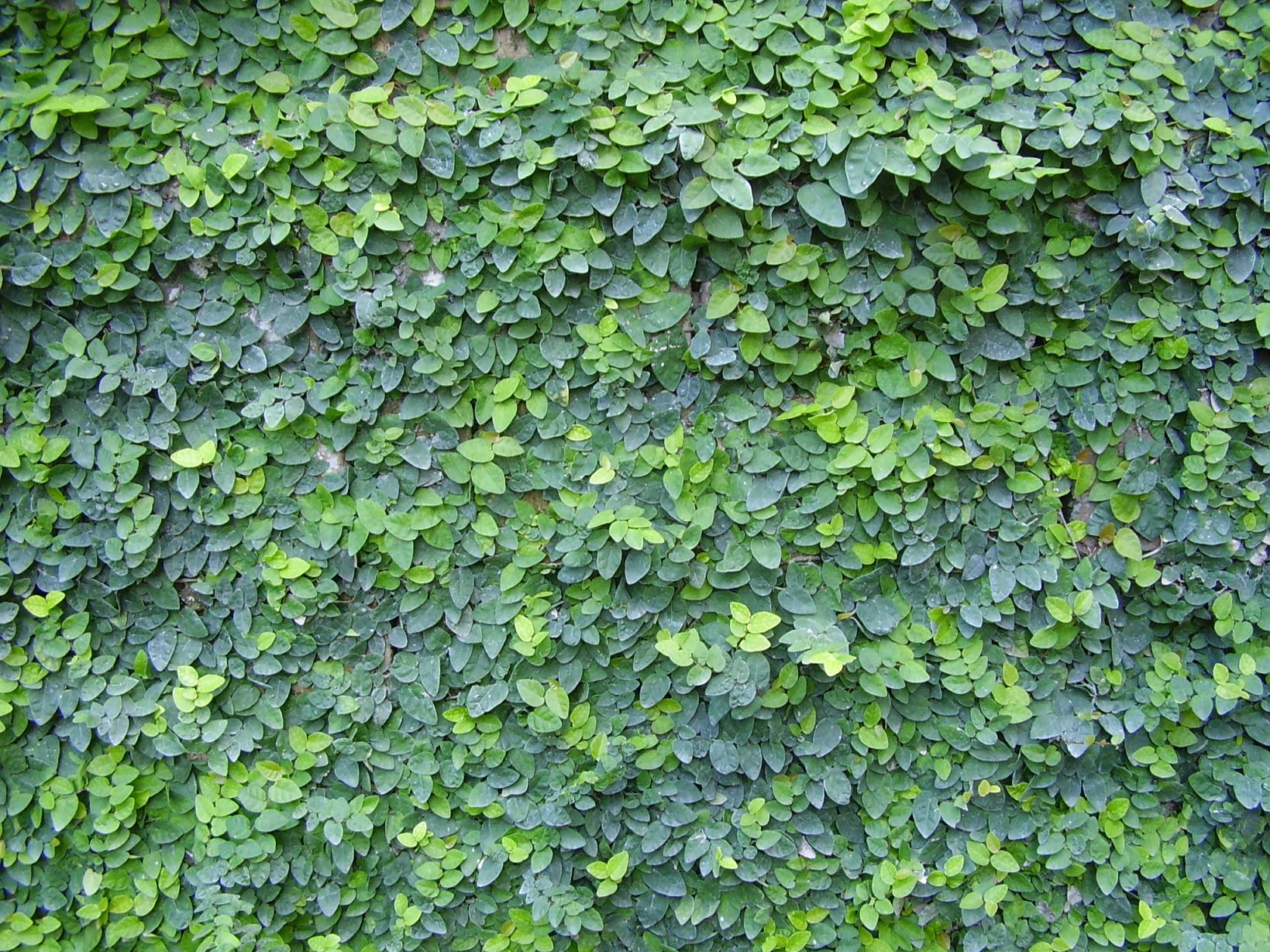
Vigorous growth on a wall

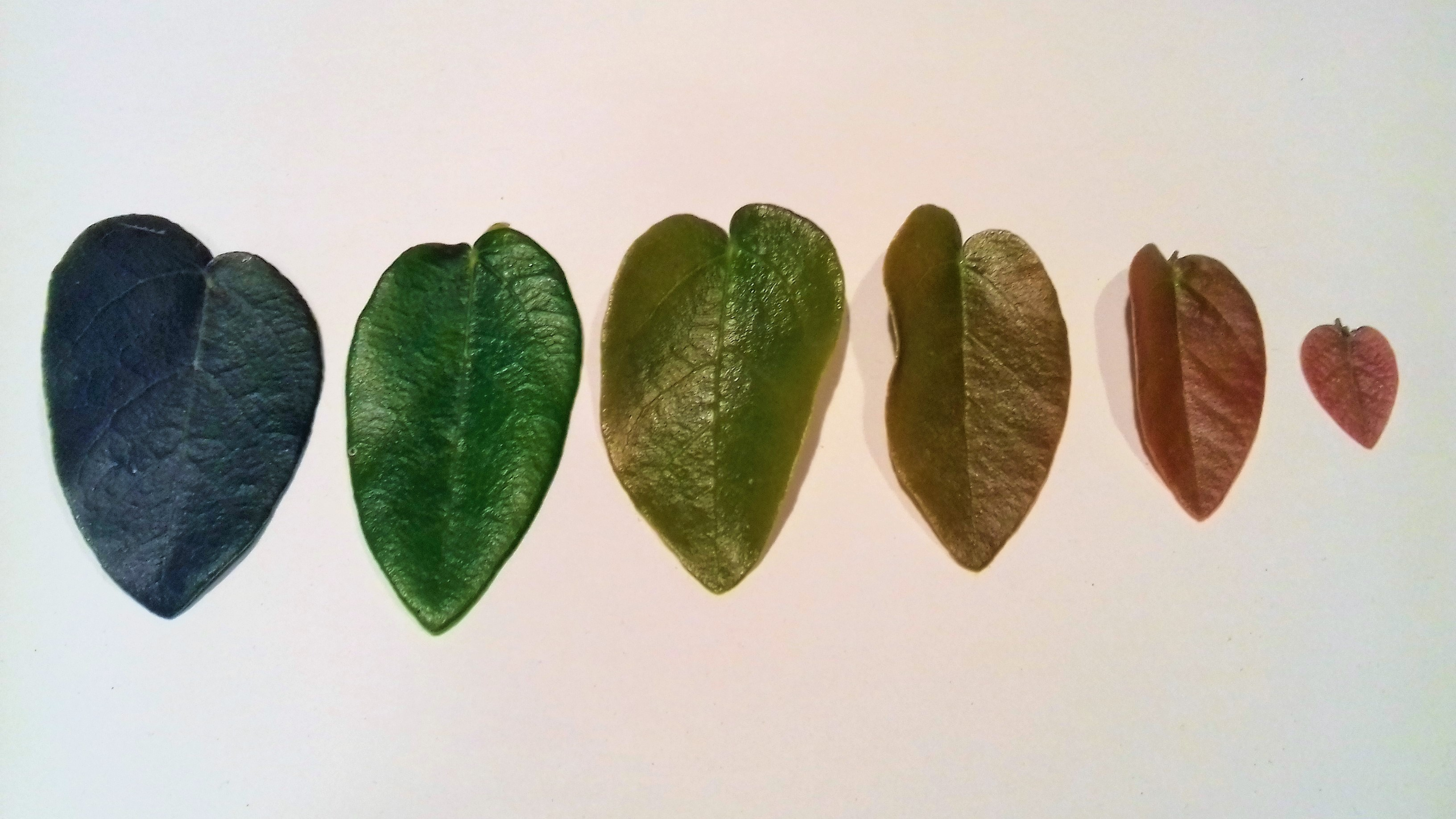
Leaves from oldest to youngest

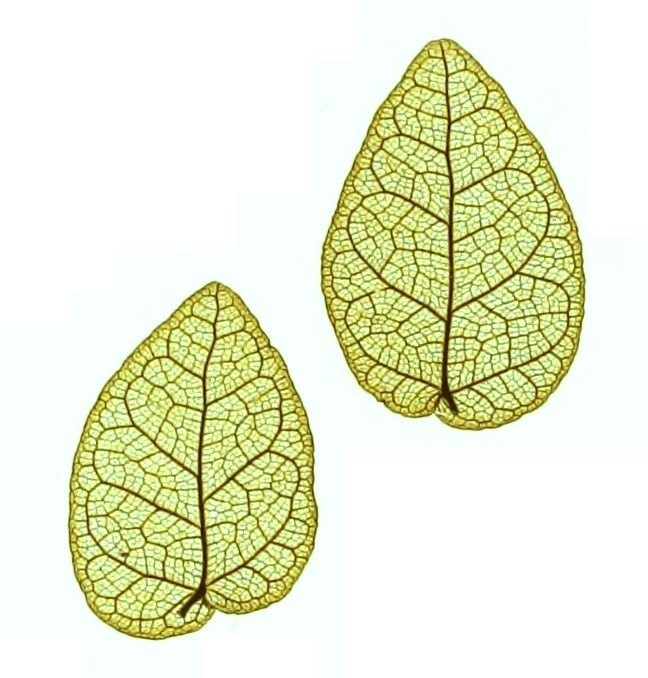
Nature printed leaves, showing shape and venation

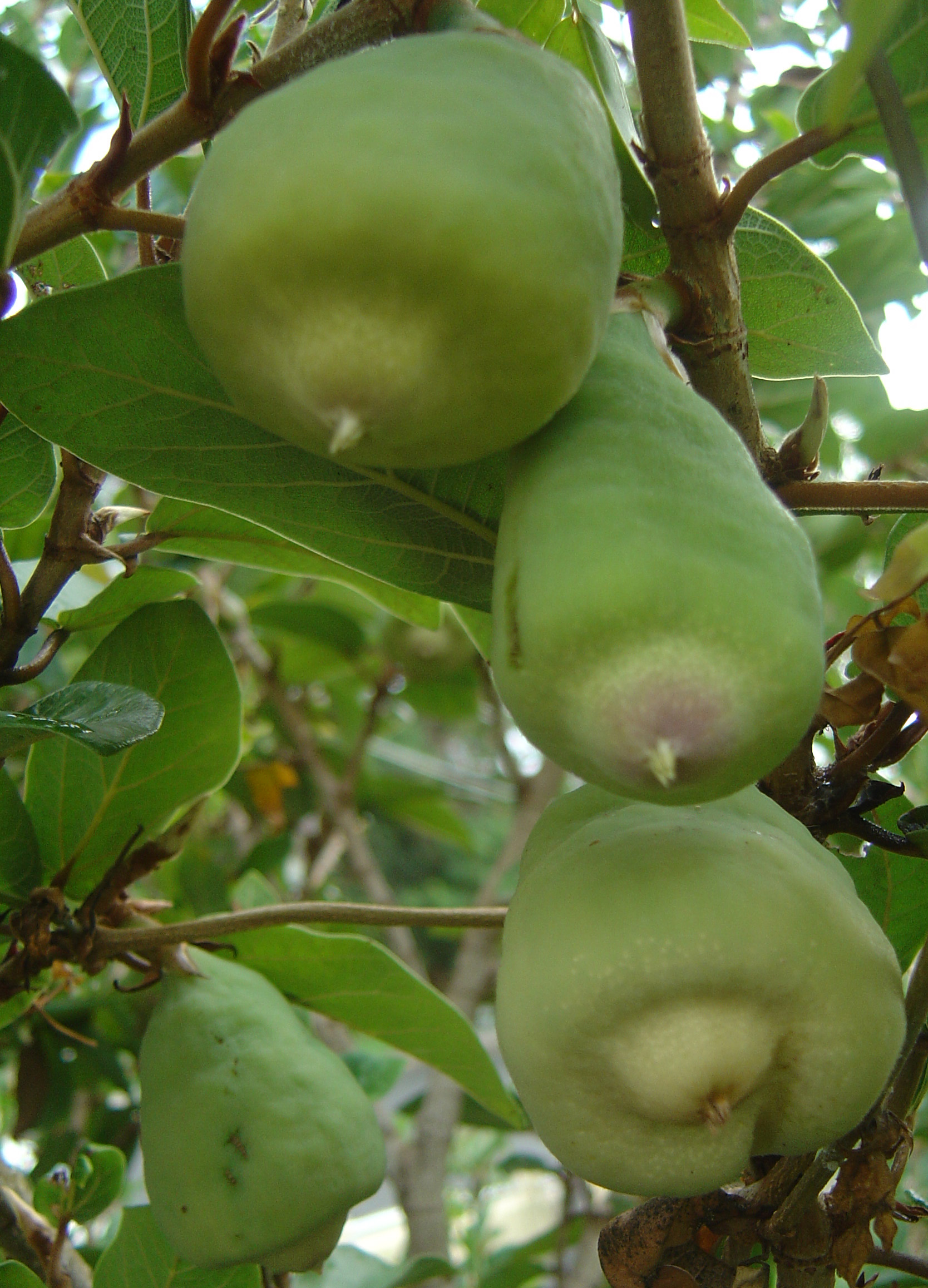
Syconia (figs)

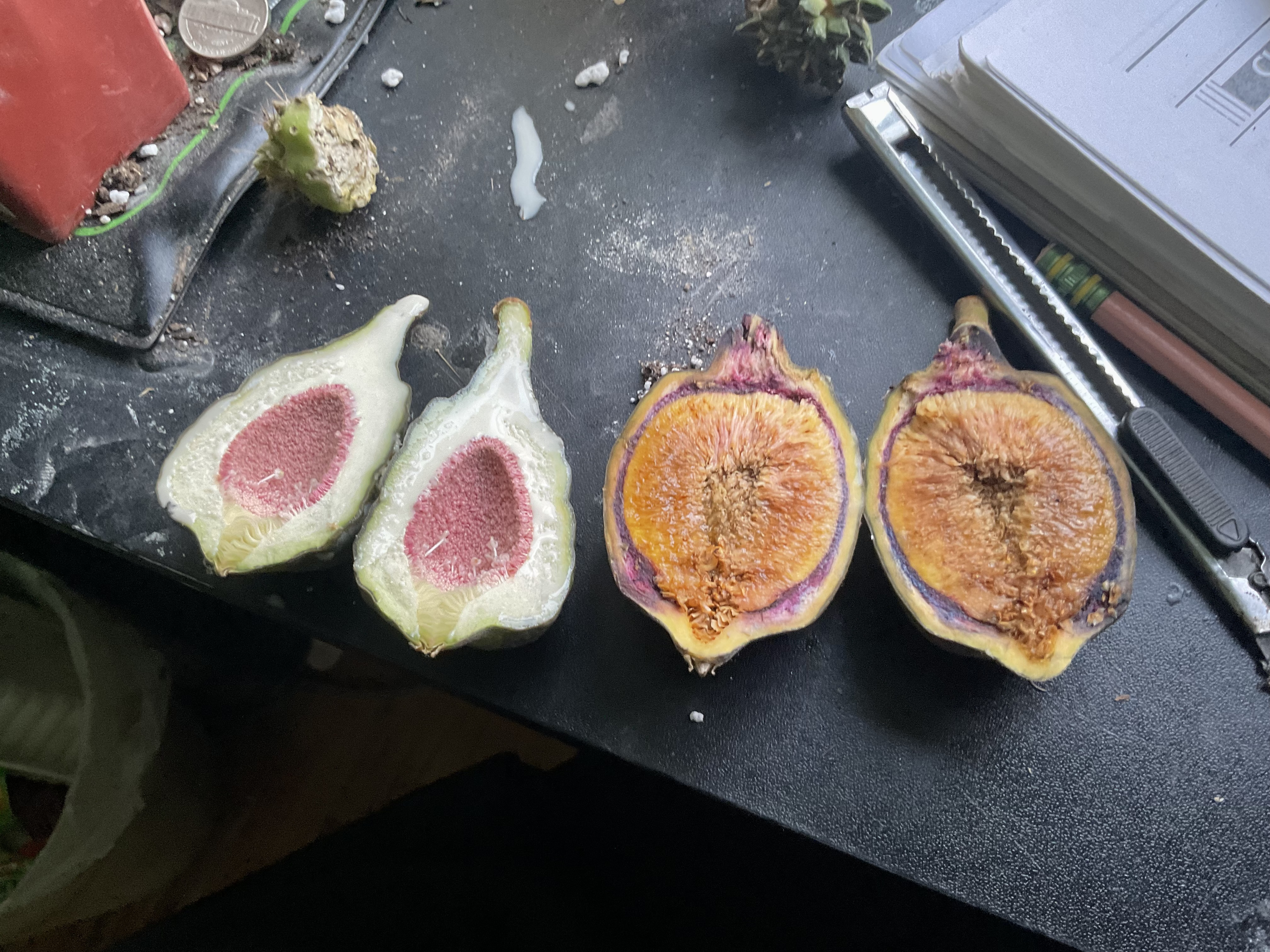
Ficus pumila male and female Syconia
