= Cui Anqian =

Chinese general

Cui Anqian (崔安潛), courtesy name Jinzhi (進之), was an official and general of the Chinese Tang dynasty, who was a participant in Tang's campaigns against the agrarian rebels Wang Xianzhi and Huang Chao.

== Background and early career ==
It is not known when Cui Anqian was born. He was from the prominent Cui clan of Qinghe (清河, in modern Xingtai, Hebei), which claimed ancestry from the ruling house of the Spring and Autumn period state Qi, and which traced its ancestry to officials of the Qin dynasty, Han dynasty, Cao Wei, Jin dynasty (266–420), Later Zhao, Southern Yan, Liu Song, Northern Wei, Northern Qi, and the Tang dynasty. Cui Anqian's grandfather Cui Yi (崔異) served as a prefectural prefect, and his father Cui Cong (崔從) served as a regional governor and was created the Count of Qinghe. He had at least three older brothers, Cui Yanfang (崔彥方), Cui Shenyou (who would later serve as chancellor), and Cui Zhoushu (崔周恕), and at least one younger brother, Cui Yanchong (崔彥沖).

Cui Anqian passed the imperial examinations in the Jinshi class in 849, during the reign of Emperor Xuānzong. During the reign of Emperor Xuānzong's son Emperor Yizong, he would successively serve as the governor (觀察使, Guanchashi) of Jiangxi Circuit (江西, headquartered in modern Nanchang, Jiangxi) and then the military governor (Jiedushi) of Zhongwu Circuit (忠武, headquartered in modern Xuchang, Henan) as well as the prefect of Zhongwu's capital Xu Prefecture (許州).

== During Emperor Xizong's reign ==
During the reign of Emperor Yizong's son Emperor Xizong, the Tang realm became overrun by agrarian rebels. In 876, Cui Anqian, pursuant to Emperor Xizong's orders, sent troops under his officer Zhang Zimian (張自勉) to combat the major agrarian rebel Wang Xianzhi. In 877, however, Emperor Xizong ordered Zhang Zimian to transfer his 7,000 men to another Zhongwu officer, Zhang Guan (張貫), who was to serve under the overall commander of the operations against Wang, Song Wei (宋威)—who, for reasons lost to history, had long despised Zhang Zimian. The chancellor Zheng Tian objected, pointing out that giving the Zhongwu troops to Song would leave Cui and Zhongwu Circuit defenseless; as a result, Emperor Xizong had Zhang Zimian give 4,000 of his soldiers to Song, while allowing him to return to Zhongwu with 3,000 men.

Cui was subsequently transferred to Xichuan Circuit (西川, headquartered in modern Chengdu, Sichuan) to serve as its military governor and the mayor of its capital Chengdu Municipality. Once there, he tried to root out corruption that was rampant under the prior military governor Gao Pian and to revise improper regulations that Gao had imposed. He also tried to strengthen Xichuan's defenses by improving military training. In 878, when Dali, which had long been in intermittent warfare with Tang, made peace overtures through letters that its prime minister wrote to the Tang Office of the Chancellors, the chancellors did not respond directly but had Cui author a response in his own name. Eventually, however, Cui's actions to try to rectify the problems that Gao left him offended Gao's ally, the chancellor Lu Xi, and Lu falsely accused Cui of crimes. Cui was thus removed from his office, given the honorary post of advisor to the Crown Prince (even though there was no crown prince at the time), and sent to the eastern capital Luoyang.

After the major agrarian rebel Huang Chao captured the capital Chang'an around the new year 881 and established his own state of Qi as its emperor, Emperor Xizong fled to Chengdu. Cui followed Emperor Xizong there, and was subsequently made senior advisor to the Crown Prince. In 882, with Gao, then titular overall commander of the operations against Huang, taking no real actions against Huang, the chancellor Wang Duo volunteered to oversee the operations against Huang. Emperor Xizong agreed, and further made Cui Wang's deputy. (Gao, in anger, wrote an irreverent submission to Emperor Xizong that accused Wang of being a failed general and Cui of being corrupt, and Emperor Xizong had Zheng author a harshly worded response.) In 883, however, after Wang was relieved of his command, Cui was also relieved of his command and made the defender of Luoyang. In 886, when the warlord Zhu Mei supported Emperor Xizong's distant cousin Li Yun the Prince of Xiang as a competing claimant to the imperial throne, Cui, who was then at Hezhong Circuit (河中, headquartered in modern Yuncheng, Shanxi), submitted a letter supporting Li Yun's claim, along with other imperial officials then at Hezhong. He appeared to suffer no reprisals after both Li Yun and Zhu were killed later in the year, however.

== During Emperor Zhaozong's reign ==
In 889, by which time Emperor Xizong's brother Emperor Zhaozong was emperor, Wang Jingwu the military governor of Pinglu Circuit (平盧, headquartered in modern Weifang, Shandong) died. Most of Wang's officers supported his son Wang Shifan as his successor, but one of his officers, Zhang Chan (張蟾) the prefect of Di Prefecture (棣州, in modern Binzhou, Shandong), refused to support Wang Shifan. Emperor Zhaozong, trying to take initiative in this conflict, commissioned Cui Anqian as the military governor of Pinglu, carrying the honorary chancellor title of Shizhong (侍中). Zhang welcomed Cui to Di Prefecture and planned a campaign against Wang Shifan. The campaign apparently lasted for more than a year, but in early 891, Wang Shifan, after killing the officer Lu Hong (盧弘), who had turned against him, used the momentum to attack Di Prefecture. Di fell, and Wang killed Zhang; Cui fled back to Chang'an. Emperor Zhaozong subsequently commissioned Wang as the military governor of Pinglu. Cui subsequently died, although the date is not known. He was given the posthumous name of Zhenxiao (貞孝, "faithful and filially pious").

== Sources ==
- Old Book of Tang, vol. 177.
- New Book of Tang, vol. 114.
- Zizhi Tongjian, vols. 252, 253, 254, 255, 256, 258.
