= Wang Shifan =

Wang Shifan (Chinese: 王師範) (874 – c. July 10, 908) was a warlord late in the Chinese Tang dynasty, who ruled Pinglu Circuit (平盧, headquartered in modern Weifang, Shandong) from 889 to 905 (formally, as its military governor (Jiedushi) from 891 to 903). He was initially a vassal of the powerful military governor of Xuanwu Circuit (宣武, headquartered in modern Kaifeng, Henan), Zhu Quanzhong, but rose against Zhu in 903 in response to an edict issued by Emperor Zhaozong of Tang. (Whether the edict was actually the will of Emperor Zhaozong was unclear.) After he was defeated by Zhu, he resubmitted to Zhu. In 908, by which point Zhu had taken over the Tang throne and established a new Later Liang as its Emperor Taizu, in response to the plea by the wife of Emperor Taizu's nephew Zhu Youning (朱友寧), who was killed in Wang's resistance campaign, Emperor Taizu ordered that Wang and his entire family be executed.

== Background ==
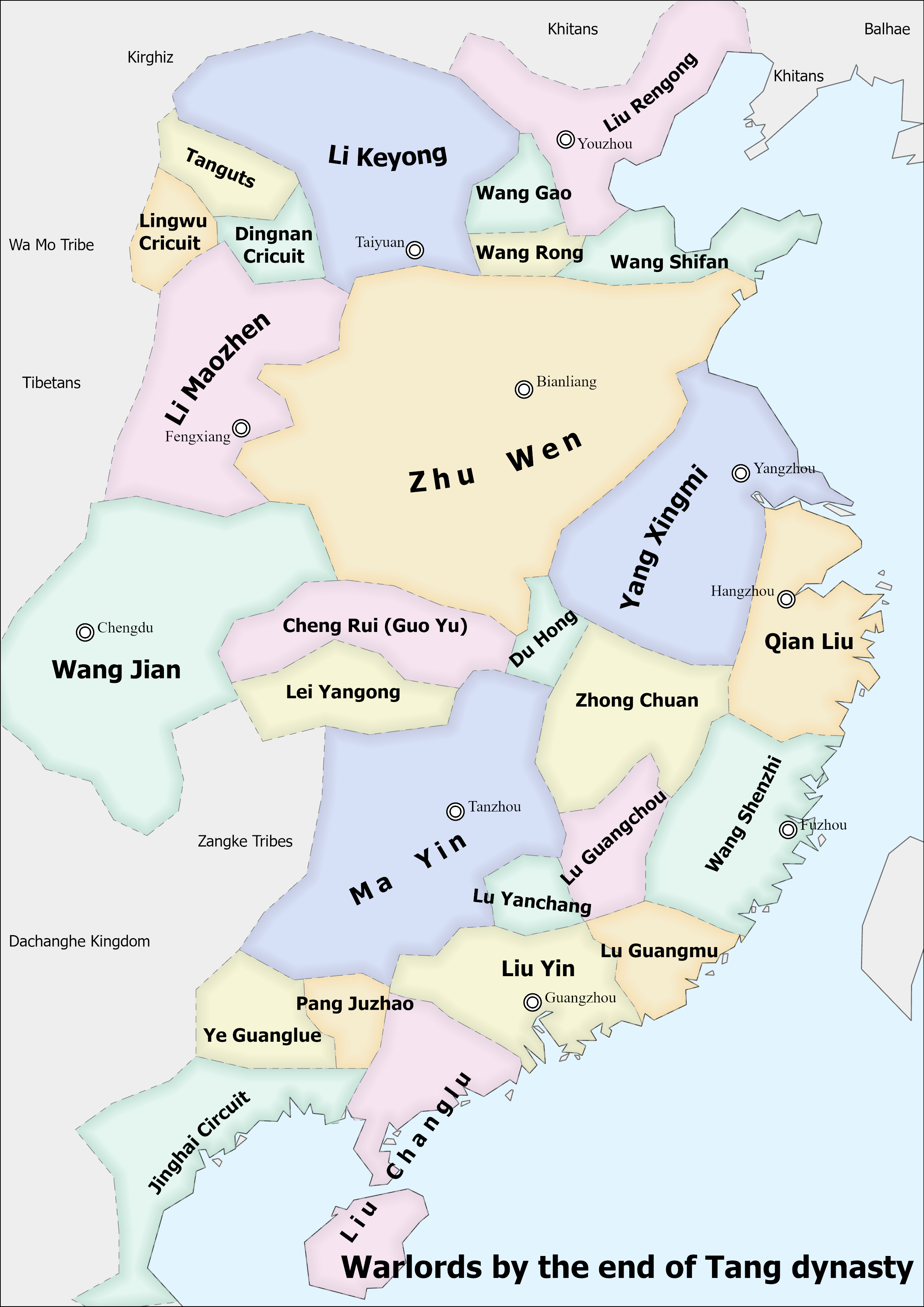
Map of warlords before the end of Tang dynasty, with the territory under Wang Shifan

Wang Shifan was born in 874, during the reign of Emperor Xizong. His father was Wang Jingwu, who would have been at the time of his birth or would later become an officer at Pinglu Circuit. Both Wang Jingwu and Wang Shifan's mother were from Pinglu's capital Qing Prefecture (青州). He had at least one older brother, Wang Shiyue (王師悅), and at least four younger brothers, Wang Shike (王師克), Wang Shihui (王師誨), Wang Shilu (王師魯), and Wang Shiyue (王師悅). In 881 or 882, Wang Jingwu expelled the military governor An Shiru (安師儒), took over Pinglu, and claimed the title of acting military governor. He subsequently pledged loyalty to the agrarian rebel leader Huang Chao, who had declared himself the emperor of a new state of Qi, but was subsequently persuaded by the Tang official Zhang Jun to return his allegiance to Tang. He sent troops to aid the chancellor Wang Duo, who was then in command of the overall operations against Qi, and was subsequently commissioned as the military governor by Wang Duo.

In 889, by which time Emperor Xizong had died and been succeeded by his brother Emperor Zhaozong, Wang Jingwu died. The soldiers supported then-15-year-old Wang Shifan to succeed him. Wang Shifan thus claimed the title of acting military governor, but Wang Jingwu's subordinate Zhang Chan (張蟾), the prefect of Di Prefecture (棣州, in modern Binzhou, Shandong), refused to support Wang Shifan, and instead requested the imperial government to send a different military governor. Emperor Zhaozong thus made the general Cui Anqian the military governor of Pinglu, and Zhang welcomed Cui to Di Prefecture to coordinate the campaign against Wang Shifan. In 891, Wang Shifan sent the officer Lu Hong (盧弘) to attack Zhang, but Lu turned his army around and prepared to attack Qing Prefecture instead. Wang Shifan sent messengers to present gifts to Lu, claiming that he was ready to surrender the circuit to Lu if Lu would be willing to spare his life. Lu believed Wang and took no precautions in entering the city; subsequently, Wang's officer Liu Xun, under Wang's orders, assassinated Lu. Wang then reviewed his troops and encouraged them with kind words, and then personally led his troops to attack Di. He captured and executed Zhang, while Cui fled back to the imperial capital Chang'an. Emperor Zhaozong subsequently commissioned him as the military governor of Pinglu.

== As Jiedushi of Pinglu ==
=== Early rule ===
Wang Shifan was said to be studious, favoring Confucianism, and fair in his governance. He was also said to be good at maintaining diplomatic relationships with other warlords, allowing his people to rest from the wars of the time, and therefore was much praised by other warlords of the time. There was an occasion when one of his maternal uncles, while drunk, killed someone. The victim's family brought an accusation against Wang's uncle, and Wang initially tried to placate the family by giving them a large cash reward. The victim's family refused the award, and Wang decided that he could not ignore the law, so he had his uncle punished. His mother, in anger, refused to see him for three years, but despite her refusal, he still went to visit her house three to four times a day and bowed to her from outside the house during the duration, hoping to change her mind. Whenever a new magistrate for Qing Prefecture's central county, Yidu, reported for duty, Wang would personally go to pay tribute to the magistrate; he bowed to the magistrate and referred to himself as "your citizen, Wang Shifan." When his staff members tried to stop him, arguing that that was too extreme a show of humility, he responded that this was to show proper respect to the elders of the locale such that his descendants would not forget their roots. Meanwhile, while Wang was able to maintain his control of Pinglu, three nearby circuits (Tianping (天平, headquartered in modern Tai'an, Shandong), Taining (泰寧, headquartered in modern Jining, Shandong), and Ganhua (感化, headquartered in modern Xuzhou, Jiangsu)) were conquered by the major warlord Zhu Quanzhong of Xuanwu Circuit, and as a result, by 897, Wang did not dare to disobey Zhu and became, effectively, a vassal of Zhu's.

=== Late rule ===
In 898, Emperor Zhaozong bestowed the honorary chancellor title of Tong Zhongshu Menxia Pingzhangshi (同中書門下平章事) on Wang Shifan.

In 901, the powerful eunuchs, led by Han Quanhui, seized Emperor Zhaozong and took him from the imperial capital Chang'an to Fengxiang Circuit (鳳翔, headquartered in modern Baoji, Shaanxi), then ruled by the eunuchs' ally Li Maozhen, as the eunuchs feared that Emperor Zhaozong and the leading chancellor Cui Yin were about to slaughter them. Cui, who was allied with Zhu, in turn summoned Zhu, who put Fengxiang's capital Fengxiang Municipality under siege. In early 903, with Fengxiang's situation becoming increasingly desperate, Han had Emperor Zhaozong issue an edict calling on the military governors around the realm to rise and attack Zhu. The edict particularly singled out Wang as an adherent of Zhu's and, as part of the order to Yang Xingmi the military governor of Huainan Circuit (淮南, headquartered in modern Yangzhou, Jiangsu), commissioned Yang's subordinate Zhu Jin, who had ruled Taining at one point, as the military governor of Pinglu. Upon reading the edict, Wang was greatly distressed, and commented, "We are the outer defenses for the Emperor. How can we just sit here and watch the Son of Heaven be trapped and humiliated? Do we have these troops just to defend ourselves?" The retired chancellor Zhang Jun also wrote to Wang and encouraged to rise against Zhu Quanzhong. Wang therefore prepared to do so.

With most of Zhu's elite troops at Fengxiang with him, Wang devised a daring plan to have his own officers disguised at merchants, to simultaneously start uprising at a large number of locations throughout the territory controlled by Zhu, including Xuanwu's capital Bian Prefecture (汴州), Ganhua's capital Xu Prefecture (徐州), Taining's capital Yan Prefecture (兗州), Tianping's capital Yun Prefecture (鄆州), Qi Prefecture (齊州, in modern Jinan, Shandong), Yi Prefecture (沂州, in modern Linyi, Shandong), Henan Municipality (河南, i.e., the eastern capital Luoyang), Meng Prefecture (孟州, in modern Jiaozuo, Henan), Hua Prefecture (滑州, in modern Anyang, Henan), Hezhong Municipality (河中, in modern Yuncheng, Shanxi), Shan Prefecture (陝州, in modern Sanmenxia, Henan), Guo Prefecture (虢州, also in modern Sanmenxia), and Hua Prefecture (華州, in modern Weinan, Shaanxi, not the previously mentioned Hua Prefecture). However, in most circumstances, the Pinglu officers who planned the uprising were informed on by others and arrested in advance. Only Liu Xun was able to surprise the defenders of Yan Prefecture and seize it.

In response, Zhu Quanzhong's nephew Zhu Youning, who was at Bian Prefecture at that time, prepared to attack Wang, and he summoned Ge Congzhou, who was the military governor of Taining at the time but who was then stationed at Xing Prefecture (邢州, in modern Xingtai, Hebei). Zhu Quanzhong also sent additional troops to reinforce Zhu Youning. Wang wrote to Zhu Quanzhong's archrival Li Keyong the military governor of Hedong Circuit (河東, headquartered in modern Taiyuan, Shanxi), but while Li Keyong wrote back, praising Wang for his actions, Li Keyong did not appear to send troops to aid Wang, particularly since, by this point, Li Maozhen had capitulated to Zhu and, after slaughtering the leading eunuchs, surrendered the emperor to Zhu to sue for peace. By late spring 903, Zhu's main troops were back at Xuanwu, preparing for a major attack on Wang, and Zhu Youning had defeated an attack by Wang Shifan's younger brother Wang Shilu on Qi Prefecture and cut off the communications between Wang Shifan and Liu.

With his own defensive positions in danger, Wang sought aid from Yang Xingmi. Yang sent his general Wang Maozhang to aid Wang Shifan. The joint forces of Wang Maozhang and Wang Shifan's brother Wang Shihui were thereafter able to capture Mi Prefecture. However, with Zhu Youning having captured Bochang (博昌, in modern Binzhou) and Deng Prefecture (登州, in modern Yantai, Shandong), Wang Shifan took up defensive positions with troops from Deng and Lai (萊州, also in modern Yantai) Prefectures. Zhu first defeated the soldiers from Deng Prefecture, but wore his own troops out in the process; Wang Shifan and Wang Maozhang then jointly counterattacked, killing Zhu Youning in battle. A subsequent attack by Zhu Quanzhong himself against Wang Shifan and Wang Maozhang was inconclusive, but Wang Maozhang, believing defeat to be inevitable, withdrew in the middle of the night. Yang's general Zhang Xun (張訓), who had taken over Mi Prefecture, also withdrew from Mi, leaving Wang Shifan without outside aid. Further, his brother Wang Shike was then captured in an attack on Linqu (臨朐, in modern Weifang) by Zhu's general Yang Shihou.

The morale of Wang Shifan's army was still quite high at that time, and the officers advocated holding out against Zhu. However, because Wang Shike had been captured by the Xuanwu army, Wang Shifan decided to sue for peace. He sent his deputy military governor Li Siye (李嗣業) and Wang Shiyue to offer to surrender and let Wang Shilu serve as a hostage. With Zhu then fearing a joint attack by a rejuvenated Li Maozhen and Li Maozhen's adoptive son Li Jihui the military governor of Jingnan Circuit (靜難, headquartered in modern Xianyang, Shaanxi), he accepted Wang Shifan's surrender and recommissioned him as the acting military governor of Pinglu — but sent his own officers to take over Deng, Lai, Zi (淄州, in modern Zibo, Shandong), and Di Prefectures, leaving Wang Shifan in effective control of just Qing Prefecture. At Wang's direction, Liu Xun also surrendered Yan Prefecture.

== After departing Pinglu ==
Wang Shifan remained at Pinglu until 905. That year, Zhu Quanzhong commissioned his associate Li Zhen to be the acting military governor of Pinglu to replace Wang. Upon Li's arrival, the Wang clan left it and travelled west toward Bian Prefecture. When Wang Shifan reached Puyang (濮陽, in modern Puyang, Henan), he changed his clothes into plain civilian clothes and rode a donkey from that point on, to show humility. When he reached Bian Prefecture, Zhu still treated him as an honored guest, and had him commissioned the military governor of Heyang Circuit (河陽, headquartered in modern Luoyang).

In 907, Zhu forced Emperor Zhaozong's son and successor Emperor Ai to yield the throne to him, ending Tang and starting a new Later Liang (with him as its Emperor Taizu). Wang was thereafter recalled from Heyang to Luoyang and made a general of the imperial guards. Meanwhile, after Emperor Taizu subsequently created many of his sons and nephews' imperial princes, Zhu Youning's wife wept and told him:

Your Imperial Majesty turned the clan into the imperial clan, and the clan members all received glory and favor. But the husband of your servant girl alone suffered misfortune, having died on the battlefield due to the rebellion of Wang Shifan. My deadly enemy is still alive, and your servant girl is suffering.

Emperor Taizu responded, "I almost forgot about this bandit." He then sent an emissary to Luoyang to order the Wang clan be massacred. When the emissary got to Luoyang, he dug a large pit in the ground and then announced Emperor Taizu's edict. Wang Shifan set up a large feast table and sat with his clan members, and then responded, "No one can escape death, particularly the guilty ones. I do not wish for our bodies to lie around without order between the elders and the children." After the feast started, he ordered that the clan members, from the youngest ones first, be led to the pit to be executed. Some 200 died, including Wang himself and his brothers Wang Shihui and Wang Shiyue. In 925, by which time Later Liang had been destroyed and Li Keyong's son Li Cunxu was the emperor of a newly established Later Tang (as Emperor Zhuangzong), Emperor Zhuangzong ordered that Wang Shifan be given posthumous honors.

== Notes and references ==
- New Book of Tang, vol. 187.
- History of the Five Dynasties, vol. 13.
- New History of the Five Dynasties, vol. 42.
- Zizhi Tongjian, vols. 258, 261, 263, 264, 265, 266.
