= O-aew =

Shaved ice dessert popular in Phuket, Thailand

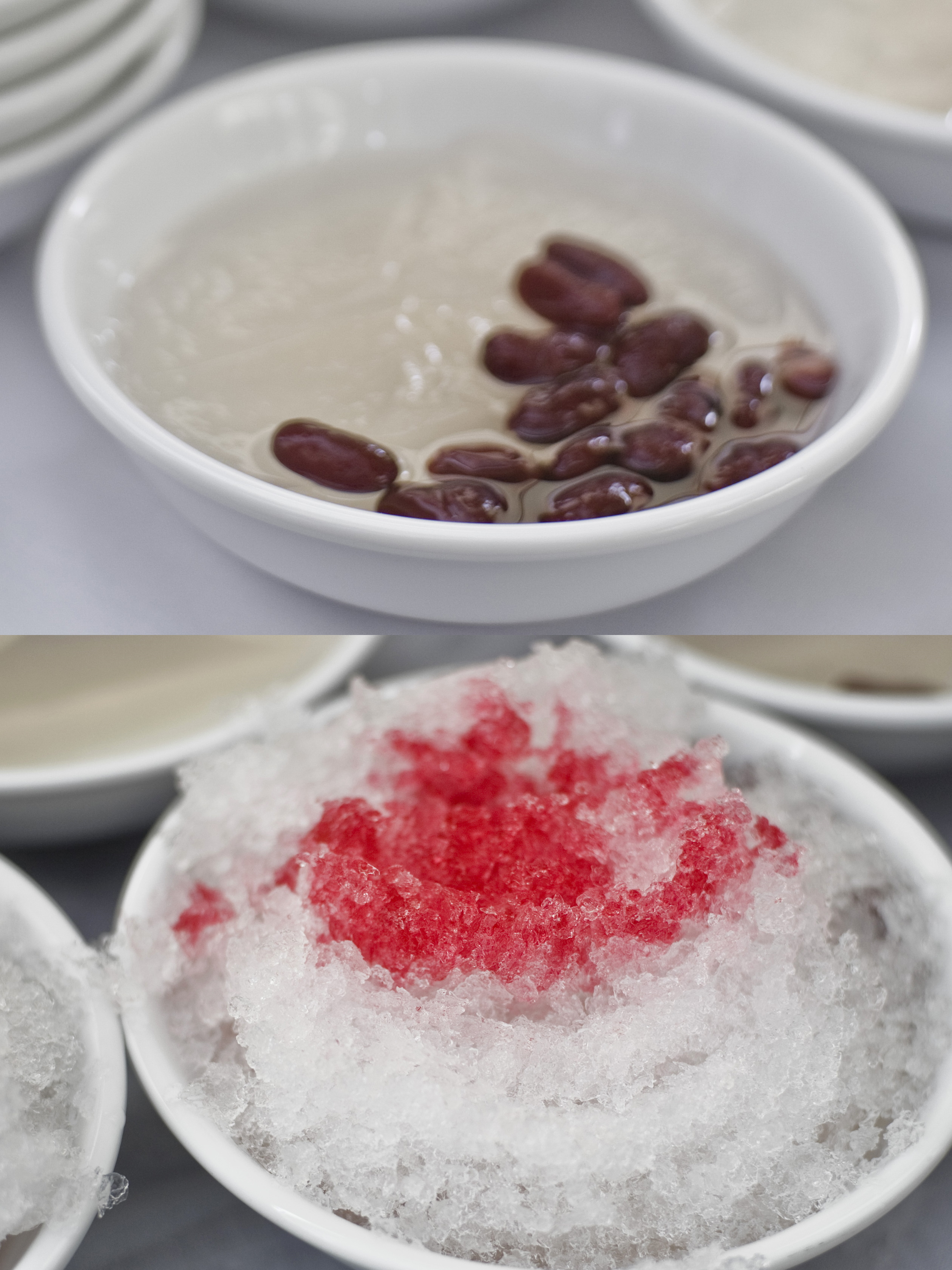
O-aew, with o-aew jelly and kidney beans (top), served with shaved ice and syrup (bottom).

O-aew (Thai: โอ้เอ๋ว, (Note: Also spelled โอ้วเอ๋ว, โอเอ๋ว, โอ๊ะเอ๋ว, etc.) RTGS: o-eo, pronounced [ôːʔěːw], from Chinese: 薁蕘; Pe̍h-ōe-jī: ò-giô) is a shaved ice dessert known as a local specialty of Phuket, Thailand. Introduced by Hokkien Chinese settlers, it is known after its main ingredient, a jelly made from seeds of the o-aew plant (a variety of the creeping fig, Ficus pumila var. awkeotsang), an ingredient now most commonly found in Taiwan where it is known as aiyu jelly.

== History and preparation ==
O-aew originated from aiyu jelly, an ingredient in Hokkien Chinese cuisine, and was introduced to Phuket by Hokkien immigrants who settled there during the boom in the tin mining industry from the mid-19th to early 20th centuries. While the jelly is found today in various locations with significant Hokkien diaspora such as Taiwan and Singapore, the variety found in Phuket was most influenced by nearby Penang, in Malaysia. Several well-known vendors in Phuket's Old Town have sold o-aew as a family business over multiple generations.

The dessert's main ingredient is the jelly made from seeds of the o-aew plant. The seeds are soaked and squeezed to extract a gel, which is mixed with extracted juice from the nam wa banana. Calcium sulphate is added as a gelling agent, and the jelly left to set overnight. It is served with crushed ice and syrup, and with toppings commonly including red kidney beans and grass jelly. It is often ordered by referring to the colours white, red and black as a code for the ingredients: white for the o-aew jelly, red for the kidney beans, and black for the grass jelly. For example, white-red would refer to an order of o-aew with a topping of kidney beans.

== See also ==
- Climbing fig tofu
- List of Thai desserts
- Phuket cuisine
