= Wang Jingwu =

Wang Jingwu (王敬武) (died 889) was a warlord late in the Chinese Tang dynasty, who ruled Pinglu Circuit (平盧, headquartered in modern Weifang, Shandong) as its military governor (jiedushi) from 882 to 889.

== Background and seizure of Pinglu ==
It is not known when Wang Jingwu was born, but it is known that he was from Qing Prefecture (青州, in modern Weifang, Shandong, the capital of Pinglu Circuit) and that he served as an officer under An Shiru (安師儒) the military governor of Pinglu. In 881 or 882, there was an agrarian rebellion in the region of Qing and Di (棣州, in modern Binzhou, Shandong) Prefectures, and An sent him to suppress it. After he returned to Qing, he expelled An and claimed the title of acting military governor. Thereafter, turning away from his allegiance to the then-reigning Tang emperor Emperor Xizong, he sought and received a commission from Huang Chao, who had several months earlier captured the Tang imperial capital Chang'an, forced Emperor Xizong to flee to Chengdu, and declared his own state of Qi as its emperor.

Wanting to turn Wang Jingwu's allegiance back to Tang, the Tang chancellor Wang Duo, who was in charge of the operations against Huang, sent the imperial official Zhang Jun to try to persuade Wang Jingwu and bestow the commission of acting military governor. When Zhang arrived at Pinglu, Wang Jingwu initially refused to meet him. When Wang eventually met with Zhang, Zhang rebuked him, and further used a speech to turn the soldiers' opinions toward loyalty to Tang. The soldiers' opinions affected Wang, and Wang decided to accept the Tang commission and sent troops to aid Wang Duo's campaign. Wang Duo subsequently made him military governor. After Tang forces recaptured Chang'an, Wang Jingwu was given the honorary chancellor designation of Tong Zhongshu Menxia Pingzhangshi (同中書門下平章事) and the honorary title of acting Taiwei (太尉, one of the Three Excellencies).

== Death and succession ==
Wang Jingwu died in 889 and was succeeded by his 15-year-old son Wang Shifan. Initially, his subordinate Zhang Chan (張蟾) refused to accept Wang Shifan as Wang Jingwu's successor, and the imperial government also tried to make the senior general Cui Anqian the new military governor. By 890, however, Wang Shifan had defeated Zhang and Zhang's ally Lu Hong (盧弘), and Cui fled back to Chang'an, allowing Wang Shifan to take control.

== Notes and references ==
- New Book of Tang, vol. 187.
- Zizhi Tongjian, vols. 255, 258.
