= Wiebesia pumilae =

Scientific classification
- Kingdom: Animalia
- Phylum: Arthropoda
- Clade: Pancrustacea
- Class: Insecta
- Order: Hymenoptera
- Family: Agaonidae
- Genus: Wiebesia
- Species: W. pumilae

Binomial name
- Wiebesia pumilae (Hill, 1967)

Species of wasp

Wiebesia pumilae is a fig wasp species in the genus Wiebesia, Family Agaonidae. W. pumilae is the pollinator of Ficus pumila var. awkeotsang (Jelly Fig) and Ficus pumila var. pumila (Creeping Fig). The scientific name was first published as Blastophaga pumilae in 1967 by Hill.

W. pumilae is found in Taiwan, Hong Kong and China. There are three species of pollinators of Ficus pumila: Wiebesia pumilae sp.1, Wiebesia pumilae sp.2, Wiebesia pumilae sp.3.

== Morphology ==
Male Wiebesia pumilae is 3.1–3.2 mm in length. Its body colour is yellow brown.

Female Wiebesia pumilae is 2.0–2.8 mm in length, with forward ovipositor. Its body colour is dark brown with yellowish tibiae and tarsi.

== Pollination ==
The relationship of fig and fig wasp is a classic example of obligate mutualism and coevolution. Only pollinating wasps pollinate the figs, while fig wasps only lay their eggs inside the fig ovules.

Jelly fig pollinating W. pumilae are different from Creeping fig pollinating W. pumilae in gene expression. The genetic incompatibility can be caused by altitudinal adaptations, since jelly fig and creeping fig prefer different habitat altitudes.

Creeping fig wasps can enter receptive female Jelly fig syconia and bear seeds, but they cannot enter its male syconia. Jelly fig wasps can enter both receptive female Creeping fig syconia and bear seeds and can oviposit there as well.

== Life Cycle of Wiebesia pumilae ==
=== Pre-receptive stage ===
Wiebesia pumilae spend most of their time in larvae stage, from three weeks to nine months. Wiebesia pumilae larvae grow in a galled ovule inside fig syconia.

=== Receptive stage ===
During the receptive stage, adult female Wiebesia pumilae are attracted by host-specific volatile organic compounds (VOCs). VOCs aid adult female wasps to locate host figs. Female wasps enter figs through ostiole.

=== Post-receptive stage ===
Wiebesia pumilae pollinate fig flowers and lay eggs inside their ovules. After oviposition, the larvae feed on gall tissue and mature alongside fig seeds and pollen grains.

=== Mature stage ===
As fertilised female pollinating wasps reach maturity, they leave their original fig and transfer pollen to another tree.

== See also ==
- Ficus pumila var. awkeotsang
- Aiyu Jelly
- Pollination
- Pollination network
- Coevolution
- Mutualism
