= Wushi Zhongkuilu =

Chinese cookbook

Wushi Zhongkuilu (Chinese: 浦江吳氏中饋錄; pinyin: Pujiang Wushi Zhoungkuilu) is a late-13th-century medieval Chinese culinary work on household cookery written by an anonymous author from the Pujiang region known only as "Madame Wu". It is the earliest known culinary work written by or attributed to a Chinese woman and is believed to have been published in during late Song dynasty or early Yuan dynasty.

== Content ==
The full title of the work is "Song Dynasty Pujiang Woman of the Wu Surname Records on Household Essentials", which echoes the contents of the book as a detailed guide for preparing essential household dietary ingredients and dishes of the period. This includes cooked items as well as various pickled and preserved foods that can be eaten straight or used as ingredients.

Wu's work consists of three chapters grouped according to the types of recipes and originating ingredients:

1. "Preserved Meats and Pickled Fish" (脯鮓): 20 sections
2. "Vegetable preparations" (制蔬): 38 sections
3. "Sweet foods" (甜食): 15 sections

It is also the first published work that described the use of soy sauce seasoning in dishes (referred to as "醤油") along with the more typical soy, fish, and meat based seasoning pastes common during medieval China.

== Bilingual translation ==
A bilingual Chinese and English version was published in 2023 as Madame Wu's Handbook on Home-Cooking: The Song Dynasty Classic on Domestic Cuisine, translated by Sean J. S. Chen, with extensive annotations, a glossary, and a foreword by Eugene N. Anderson and Miranda Brown.

== See also ==
- Shilin Guangji, another book on cooking written during the Yuan dynasty
