= Pujiang County, Zhejiang =

Pujiang 浦江县 Pukiang
- County
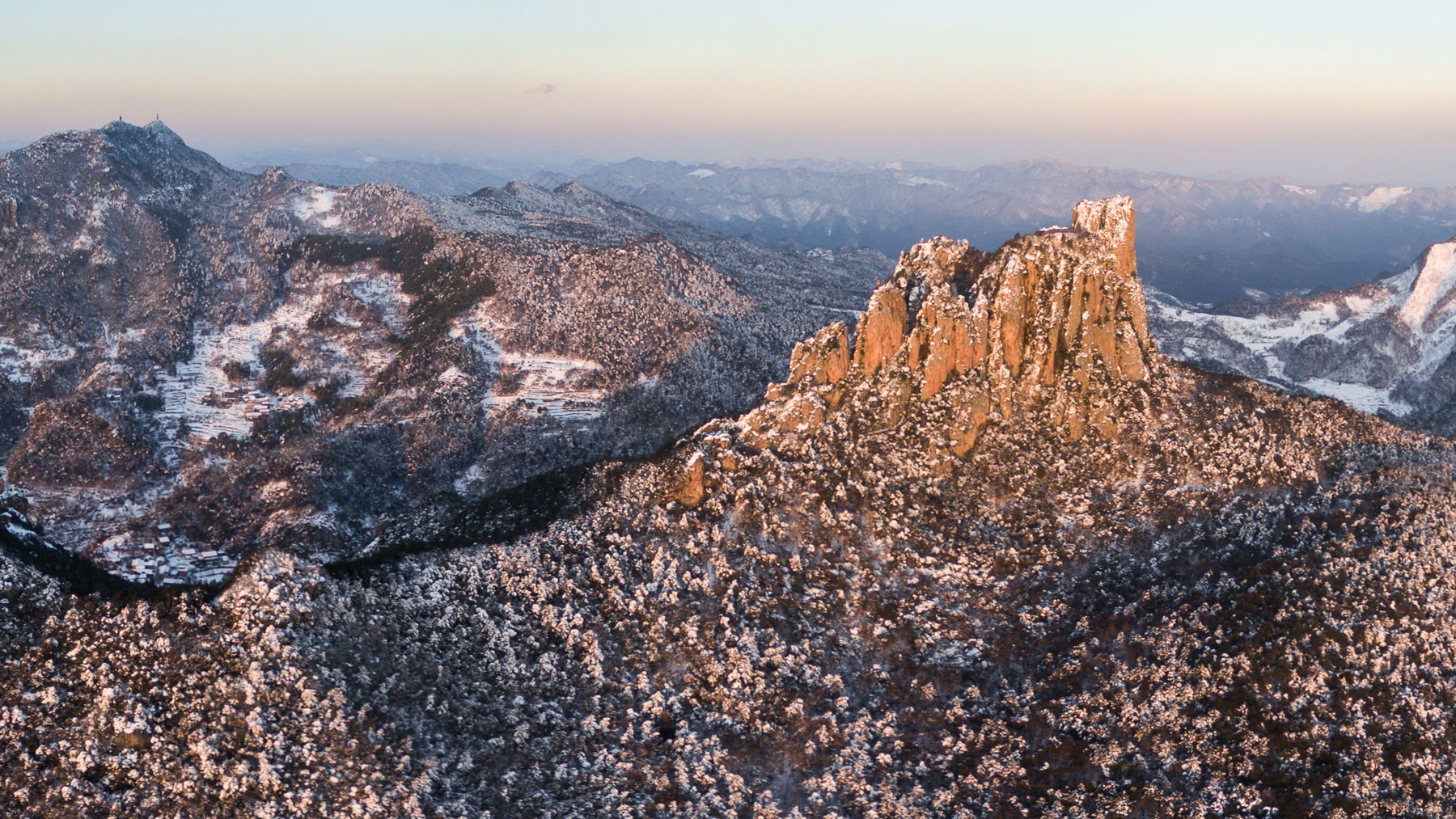

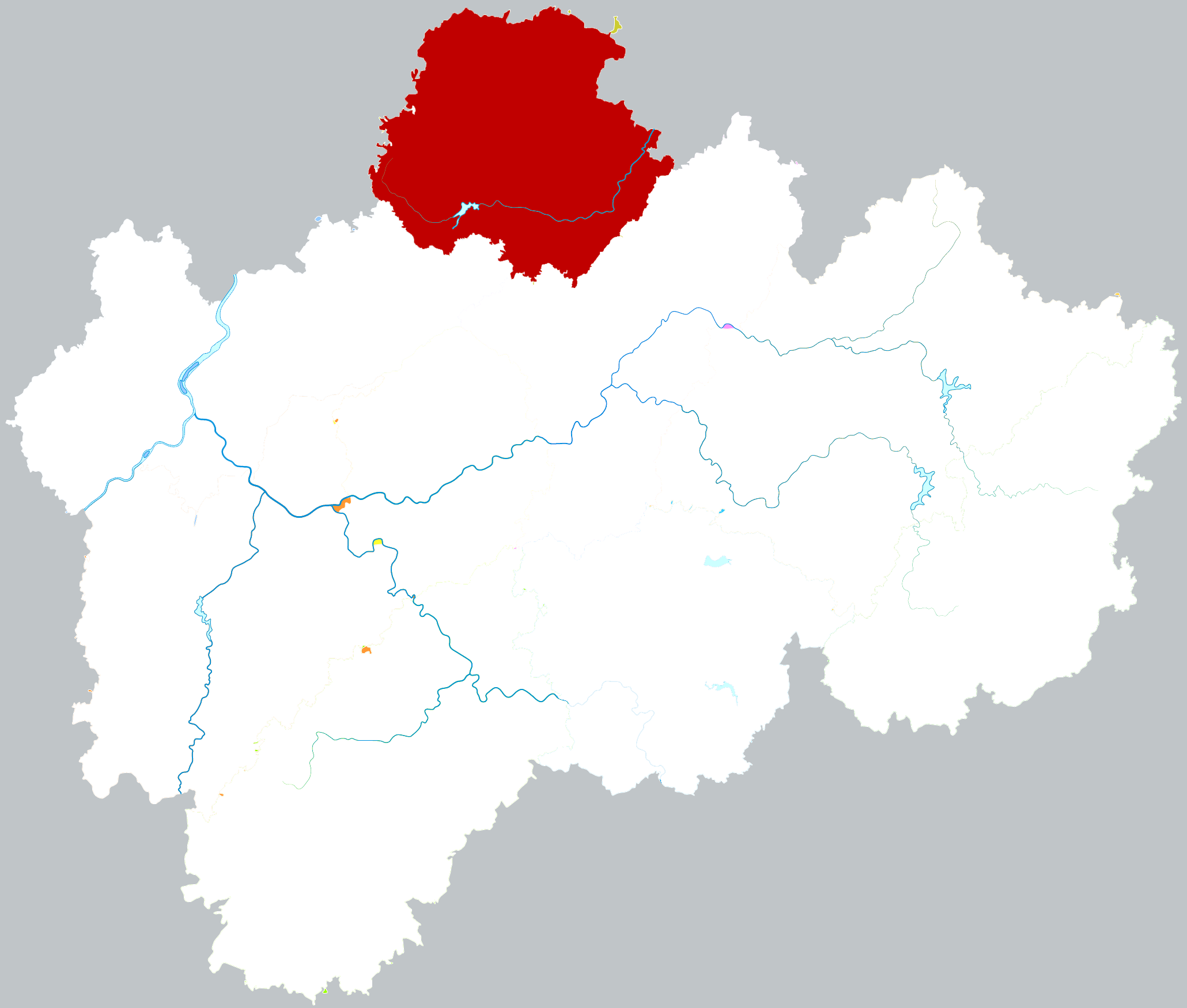
- Location of Pujiang County within Jinhua

- Location of the seat in Zhejiang
- Coordinates: 29.4603°N 119.886°E
- Country: People's Republic of China
- Province: Zhejiang
- Prefecture-level city: Jinhua

Area
  - Total: 918.16 km^{2} (354.50 sq mi)

Population (2020)
  - Total: 460,726
- Time zone: UTC+8 (China Standard)

Pujiang (Chinese: 浦江; pinyin: Pǔjiāng) is a county located in the centre of Zhejiang, China. It is administered by the prefecture-level city of Jinhua and situated in the northern part of its jurisdiction. Pujiang is bordered by Yiwu and Lanxi to the south, Jiande to the west, and Zhuji to the east.

Pujiang administers seven towns, five townships, three residential districts, 19 neighbourhood communities, and 409 villages. It has a population of approximately 380,700 and covers an area of 915.35 km^{2} (353.42 sq mi).

The county is rich in ecological tourism resources, featuring attractions such as Xinhua Mountain, a AAAA-level tourist area, as well as recently developed scenic spots including Bashiwan, Baozhang Valley, Shenli Gorge, Tongji Lake, and the First Family of Southern China. The latter refers to the Zheng family clan, whose descendants have lived in Pujiang for fifteen generations. The county is also home to the Shangshan cultural relics, the earliest Neolithic site discovered in Zhejiang, known as a significant "bright pearl" of Zhejiang's cultural history.

Pujiang is renowned for the Puyang River and was historically known as Feng. It was established as a county in the second year of Xingping during the Eastern Han dynasty (195 AD). The name was changed to Pujiang County in the third year of Tianhao during the Wuyue kingdom (910 AD), which has been retained to the present day. The county has produced many notable figures, including Song Lian, a founding minister of the Ming dynasty, and Donggao Xinyue, who travelled to Japan and is regarded as the "father of seal cutting" there.

Pujiang is also referred to as the "County of Chinese Painting and Calligraphy" and the "County of Chinese Folk Art." Its economy is diverse, with crystal and padlock manufacturing occupying a significant share of the market — accounting for up to 70% of national sales. As a result, Pujiang is known as China's "Crystal Capital" and "Padlock Centre."

== Administrative divisions ==
Pujiang County is divided into subdistricts, towns, and townships.

Subdistricts:

- Punan Subdistrict (浦南街道)
- Xianhua Subdistrict (仙华街道)
- Puyang Subdistrict (浦阳街道)

Towns:

- Huangzhai (黄宅镇)
- Yantou (岩头镇)
- Zhengzhai (郑宅镇)
- Tanxi (檀溪镇)
- Hangping (杭坪镇)
- Baima (白马镇)
- Zhengjiawu (郑家坞镇)

Townships:

- Yuzhai Township (虞宅乡)
- Dafan Township (大畈乡)
- Zhongyu Township (中余乡)
- Qianwu Township (前吴乡)
- Huaqiao Township (花桥乡)

== Climate ==
Climate data for Pujiang, elevation 116 m (381 ft), (1991–2020 normals, extremes 1981–2010)
Month	Jan	Feb	Mar	Apr	May	Jun	Jul	Aug	Sep	Oct	Nov	Dec	Year
Record high °C (°F)	24.7 (76.5)	28.1 (82.6)	34.3 (93.7)	34.3 (93.7)	36.8 (98.2)	37.5 (99.5)	41.4 (106.5)	41.1 (106.0)	39.5 (103.1)	37.1 (98.8)	31.5 (88.7)	26.2 (79.2)	41.4 (106.5)
Mean daily maximum °C (°F)	9.5 (49.1)	12.2 (54.0)	16.6 (61.9)	22.8 (73.0)	27.3 (81.1)	29.5 (85.1)	34.3 (93.7)	33.7 (92.7)	29.3 (84.7)	24.3 (75.7)	18.6 (65.5)	12.2 (54.0)	22.5 (72.5)
Daily mean °C (°F)	4.9 (40.8)	7.1 (44.8)	11.2 (52.2)	17.0 (62.6)	21.8 (71.2)	24.8 (76.6)	28.8 (83.8)	28.3 (82.9)	24.1 (75.4)	18.7 (65.7)	13.1 (55.6)	7.0 (44.6)	17.2 (63.0)
Mean daily minimum °C (°F)	1.8 (35.2)	3.6 (38.5)	7.2 (45.0)	12.6 (54.7)	17.5 (63.5)	21.3 (70.3)	24.5 (76.1)	24.3 (75.7)	20.4 (68.7)	14.6 (58.3)	9.1 (48.4)	3.4 (38.1)	13.4 (56.0)
Record low °C (°F)	−7.4 (18.7)	−7.8 (18.0)	−4.2 (24.4)	0.6 (33.1)	7.9 (46.2)	12.7 (54.9)	18.2 (64.8)	18.1 (64.6)	10.9 (51.6)	2.9 (37.2)	−2.5 (27.5)	−9.0 (15.8)	−9.0 (15.8)
Average precipitation mm (inches)	88.0 (3.46)	92.3 (3.63)	148.4 (5.84)	152.9 (6.02)	163.1 (6.42)	294.8 (11.61)	144.4 (5.69)	150.5 (5.93)	104.8 (4.13)	53.7 (2.11)	73.4 (2.89)	63.6 (2.50)	1,529.9 (60.23)
Average precipitation days (≥ 0.1 mm)	13.3	13.1	16.3	15.4	15.4	17.1	11.8	13.4	10.4	8.2	10.5	10.2	155.1
Average snowy days	4.0	2.9	0.8	0	0	0	0	0	0	0	0.1	1.6	9.4
Average relative humidity (%)	79	78	76	75	76	82	75	77	78	76	78	77	77
Mean monthly sunshine hours	96.6	96.8	114.8	139.1	154.1	128.9	225.0	204.9	154.8	155.8	125.0	122.7	1,718.5
Percentage possible sunshine	30	31	31	36	37	31	53	51	42	44	39	39	39
Source: China Meteorological Administration

== Tourism ==
=== The First Family of Southern China ===
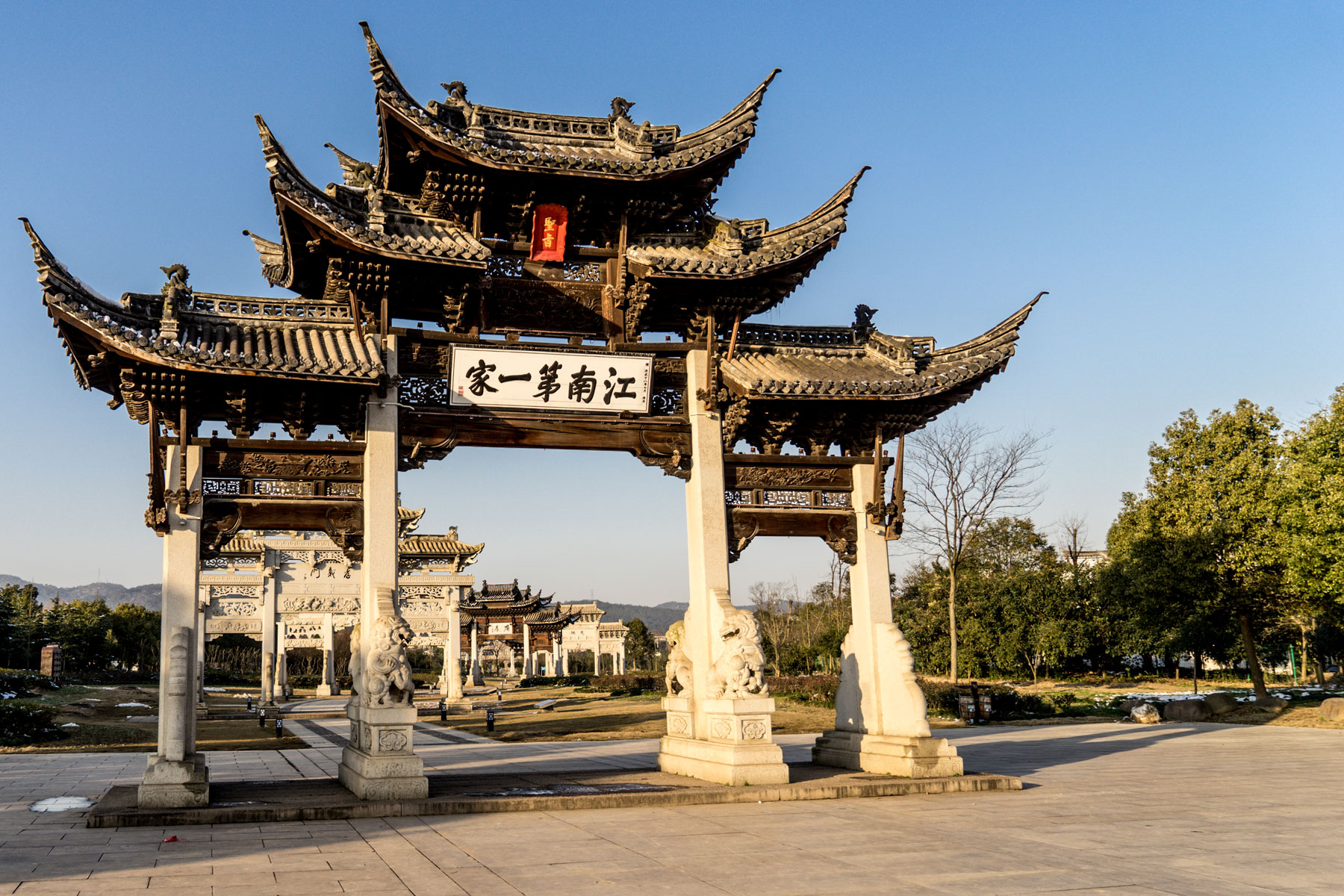
Gates outside the First Family of Southern China ancestral home

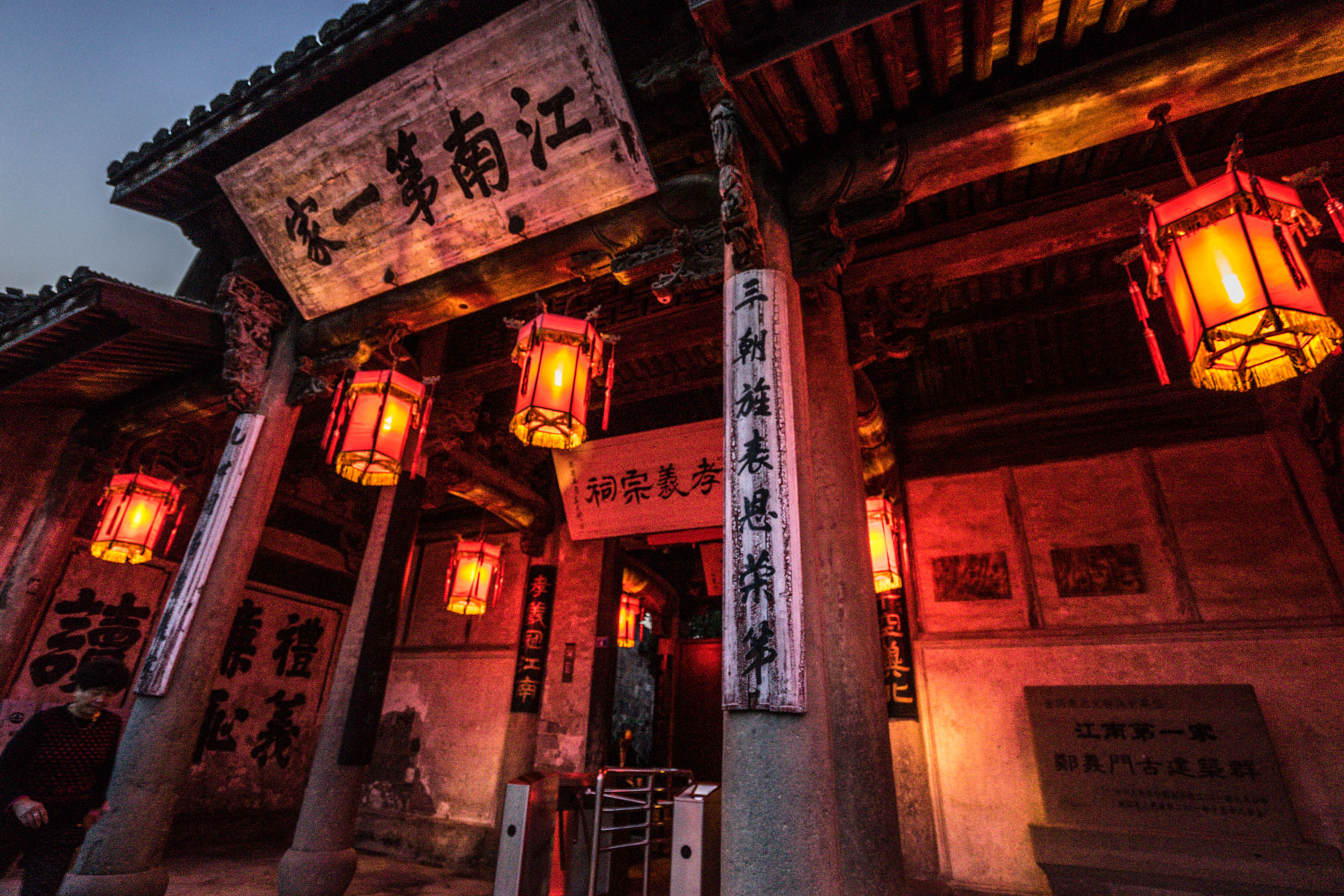
Entrance to First Family of Southern China ancestral home

The First Family of Southern China is a historic and cultural site located in Zhengzhai Village, Pujiang County. It was originally built during the Yuan dynasty and covers an area of 6,600 square metres.

== Geography and nature ==
Xianhua Mountain is located in the north of Pujiang County. It is classified as an AAAA-level scenic destination under the Tourist Attraction Rating Categories.

In the southern part of Shenli Gorge, the mountains are high and steep, while the northern section features ancestral halls and buildings dating from the Ming and Qing dynasties. The area also includes Tenli Pavilion, an ancient post house. Writers from the Song, Yuan, Ming, and Qing dynasties have composed travel journals and poems about the gorge.

The Baishiwan Scenic Area, developed in 2000, includes two valleys.

The Maling River Gorge is situated to the northwest of Pujiang.

Tongji Lake was constructed in 1956. Its dam is 35 metres high and 275 metres long, and its construction required 962 cubic metres (34,000 cu ft) of earth and stone and the labour of approximately 3.68 million workers. Sixteen villages were submerged, and 1,152 families, comprising 4,566 residents, were relocated. The lake transformed the surrounding areas along the Puyang River into productive granaries.

Baozhang Valley is located in the north of Pujiang, approximately 10 kilometres from the county seat, and covers an area of 10.5 square kilometres. The Baozhang Temple was constructed within the valley.

Songxi, named after the Songxi Creek, is a village situated in the eastern part of Pujiang County. The village has a population of approximately 3,000.

== Folklore ==
=== The Legend of Baozhang Valley ===
Baozhang Temple is situated on Baozhang Mountain, east of Xinhua Mountain in Pujiang. Behind the temple stands a hill resembling an "Emperor's Umbrella" (Chinese: 黄罗盖伞, huangluo gaisan), which refers to an ancient ceremonial umbrella used to shelter the emperor during his travels.

A well-known local legend is associated with this mountain.

According to the story, a small village once lay at the foot of Baozhang Mountain. The villagers formed a close-knit community, among whom lived a married couple who owned two black dogs. The husband worked as a farmer.

For many years, the couple was unable to have children. One night, the farmer's wife dreamed of a dragon flying to their house and landing on the roof. The next morning, they found no trace of a dragon and dismissed it as merely a dream.

A few days later, their dogs began taking turns climbing onto the roof and standing guard, regardless of weather conditions. Soon after, the wife discovered that she was pregnant.

Puzzled and frustrated by the dogs' behaviour, the couple tried repeatedly to stop them, but the dogs refused to come down. In frustration, the farmer killed one of the dogs on the ground to scare the other. Nevertheless, the dog on the roof continued to stand guard for several weeks before eventually dying of starvation and falling to the ground.

On the same day, a fortune teller passing through the village visited the couple. After hearing what had transpired, he told them: "Your home was blessed with great fortune, but it was suppressed by an evil force. Your wife is pregnant with an emperor's son — a child destined to become the Son of Heaven. The two black dogs were sent to protect her and the child. Now that the dogs are gone, the reigning emperor has become aware of this child and will send soldiers to kill you to secure his throne."

Desperate, the farmer asked for a way to escape. The fortune teller, who revealed himself to be a deity, gave the farmer a handful of sand and a chopstick, explaining: "When fleeing, throw the sand behind you and the chopstick in front of you. The sand will become a mountain to block your pursuers, and the chopstick will create a road ahead for you." The deity then vanished.

That night, soldiers indeed arrived in the village to find and kill the couple. As the couple fled, the soldiers pursued them. In his panic, the farmer reversed the instructions: he threw the chopstick behind and the sand in front. As a result, a mountain rose up in front of them, blocking their escape, and a road opened behind them, allowing the soldiers to catch up easily. The couple and their unborn child were killed on the spot.

It is said that the hill behind Baozhang Temple later took on the shape of the "Emperor's Umbrella" (huangluo gaisan), commemorating the unborn Son of Heaven.

== Notable people ==
=== Hong Xuntao ===
Hong Xuntao (9 April 1928 – 22 September 2001) was a renowned children's literature author and theorist. He is best known for his adaptation of the folklore story The Magic Paint Brush – The Story of Ma Liang. Throughout his life, he dedicated himself to writing and researching children's literature. He was recognised for his significant contributions to the field and held several positions, including membership in the Chinese Writers Association, the China Film Association, and the China Folk Literature and Art Association. He also served as a director of the Shanghai Writers Association and as executive director of the Chinese Research Society for Children's Literature.

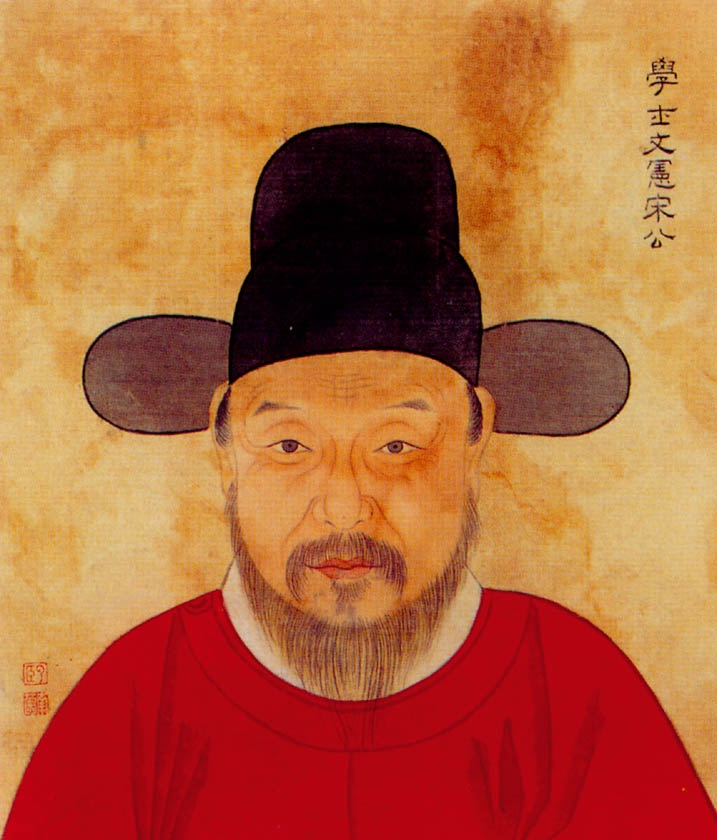
Song Lian

=== Song Lian ===
Song Lian (1310–1381), also known as Jinglian or Qianxi, was a prominent scholar and litterateur active during the late Yuan and early Ming dynasties. He was praised by Zhu Yuanzhang, the founding emperor of the Ming dynasty, as "the first official minister of Ming". Song was considered one of the three masters of poetry in the early Ming dynasty, alongside Gao Qi and Liu Ji. His representative works include A Farewell to Ma Junze of Dongyang, among others.

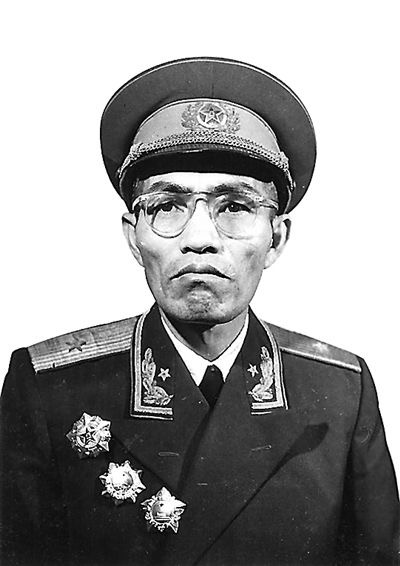
Zhang Rui

=== Zhang Rui ===
Zhang Rui (March 1909 – 17 September 2014) served as vice-minister of the Military Affairs Department of the General Staff Headquarters of China. He joined the Chinese Red Army in 1933 and became a member of the Chinese Communist Party in 1936. Zhang participated in numerous significant military campaigns, including the battles of Zhiluo Town, Pingchengguan, Lufang, and in the Yimeng Mountain area against the "Iron Wall Encirclement", as well as the Liaoshen and Pingjin campaigns and the Long March. He was a member of the fourth and fifth National Committees of the Chinese People's Political Consultative Conference. In 1955, he was awarded the rank of major general.

=== Madame Wu ===
Madame Wu (Song dynasty, 13th century) was the author of the Wushi Zhongkuilu (Chinese: 吳氏中饋錄; pinyin: Wúshì Zhōngkuìlù), an important medieval Chinese text on household cookery. The cookbook provides insights into the common foods and ingredients used in daily life during the late Song dynasty. Madame Wu is the earliest known female author of a Chinese culinary text.

== Specialties ==
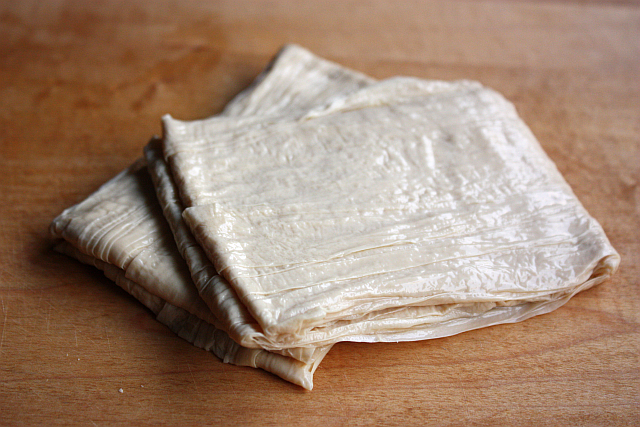
Pujiang Tofu Skin

=== Pujiang tofu skin ===
Tofu skin is a natural film of soy protein and oil that forms on the surface of heated soybean milk. It is a popular ingredient throughout northern and southern China and can be prepared in many different dishes. Tofu skin is not only considered delicious but is also valued for its nutritional benefits. It is rich in protein, lecithin, and minerals, and is believed to help prevent cardiovascular disease, support heart health, promote bone development, and reduce the risk of osteoporosis.

Pujiang tofu skin is a traditional specialty of Pujiang County with a history of more than 1,200 years. It is made using Pujiang Chun soybeans. The production process includes soaking, grinding, filtering, boiling, forming the film, removing, and drying. The final product is pale yellow and has a rich, mellow flavour. Serving tofu skin with eggs is regarded as a high form of hospitality when entertaining guests.

Approximately 2,400 tonnes of Pujiang tofu skin are produced annually, with exports to Japan and Southeast Asia. Major production areas include Wuda Road, Sharentou, Zhong Village, and Wei Village. The annual output value is around 36 million yuan. In 2012, the production technique of Pujiang tofu skin was listed as a provincial intangible cultural heritage.

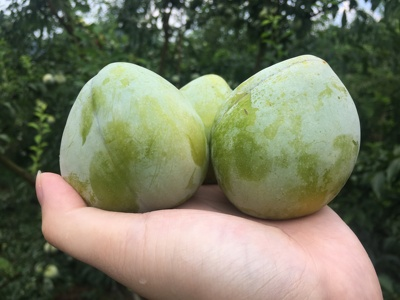
Peach-shaped Plum

=== Peach-shaped plum ===
The peach-shaped plum was first cultivated in Pujiang County during the 1980s. It is a hybrid fruit produced by grafting peach and plum trees. Recognised as a unique and prized local fruit, it won a gold medal at the National Agricultural Fair.

This fruit resembles a peach in shape but has the colour and skin texture of a plum. Its flavour combines the sweetness of peach and the tartness of plum. Research by Zhejiang University's Department of Food Processing and the Institute of Horticulture at the Zhejiang Academy of Agricultural Sciences shows that the peach-shaped plum contains a variety of essential amino acids, as well as potassium, sodium, calcium, magnesium, iron, and vitamins B1 and B2, along with carotenoids. It is traditionally believed to have various health benefits, including clearing heat, promoting digestion, and supporting the spleen and kidneys.

In recent years, government policies have supported farmers in expanding cultivation. The planting area has increased from 3 hectares (7.4 acres) to over 3,333 hectares (8,240 acres). Annual production is around 50,000 tonnes, with an output value of 260 million yuan.

=== Climbing fig tofu ===
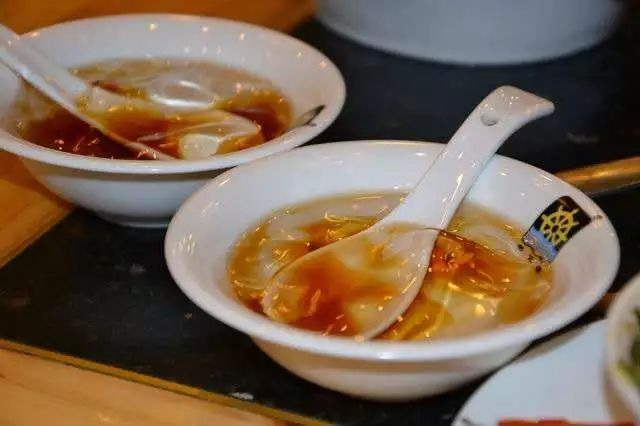
Two bowls of climbing fig tofu

Climbing fig tofu is a dessert made from the climbing fig plant, resembling a clear or yellowish jelly. On its own, it has little flavour, so it is typically served with white or brown sugar syrup. It is a seasonal food, sold only in summer, and is inexpensive, usually priced under 5 yuan.

Highly popular in Pujiang, climbing fig tofu is widely available throughout the county. It is traditionally believed to help remove moisture from the body, promote blood circulation, reduce swelling, aid detoxification, and support kidney health. It is similar to aiyu jelly in Taiwan and O-aew in Thailand, which are also made from climbing figs.

== Customs and culture ==
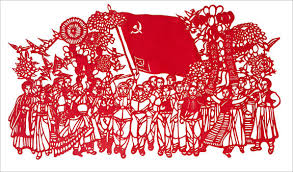
Pujiang paper-cuts

=== Pujiang paper-cuts ===
Pujiang paper-cuts have a long history, originating during the Yuan and Ming dynasties. Song Lian, a poet from Pujiang, referenced paper-cuts in his poetry. During the Qing dynasty, local opera developed rapidly in Pujiang, and under its influence, paper-cuts depicting opera characters began to emerge. Over time, this evolved into what is known today as Pujiang paper-cuts.

However, this traditional art form is declining due to a lack of successors and decreasing public awareness.

In 1993, Pujiang was named the "Hometown of Chinese Folk Art (Paper-cut)" by the Ministry of Culture of China. In 2008, Pujiang paper-cuts were inscribed on the national list of intangible cultural heritage.

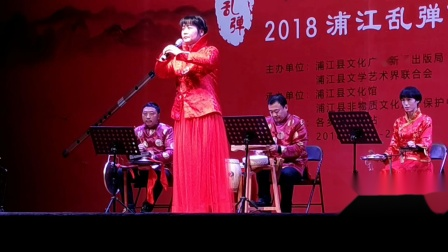
Pujiang opera

=== Pujiang opera ===
Pujiang opera is an ancient form of traditional opera that originated in Pujiang during the Song dynasty. It is popular in Pujiang, Lin'an, Jiande, and Tonglu, and has spread to other parts of Zhejiang, Jiangxi and Fujian provinces.

Pujiang opera developed from the local "vegetable basket song" and was further influenced by nanxi (Southern opera), one of China's oldest forms of opera. Although it enjoyed popularity among local people, it did not appear on formal stages until the mid-Ming dynasty.

In 2006, Pujiang opera was included on China's list of intangible cultural heritage.
