= Baima, Zhejiang =

Baima 白马镇
- Town
- Location in Zhejiang
- Coordinates: 29.5038°N 120.0608°E
- Country: People's Republic of China
- Province: Zhejiang
- Prefecture-level city: Jinhua
- County: Pujiang County
- Time zone: UTC+8 (China Standard)

Baima (simplified Chinese: 白马; traditional Chinese: 白馬; pinyin: báimǎ) is a town under the administration of Pujiang County, Jinhua, Zhejiang, China. As of 2020, it has 19 villages under its administration:

- Wufeng Village (五丰村)
- Lifeng Village (利丰村)
- Yongfeng Village (永丰村)
- Jingwu Village (旌坞村)
- Songxi Village (嵩溪村)
- Qingtang Village (清塘村)
- Lianfeng Village (联丰村)
- Chaiwu Village (柴坞村)
- Changdi Village (长地村)
- Liuzhai Village (柳宅村)
- Xiazhang Village (夏张村)
- Haoshu Village (豪墅村)
- Lantang Village (兰塘村)
- Qunxin Village (群心村)
- Dongping Village (东平村)
- Lianjiang Village (联江村)
- Gaoping Village (高坪村)
- Tongxin Village (同新村)
- Shuangxi Village (双溪村)
