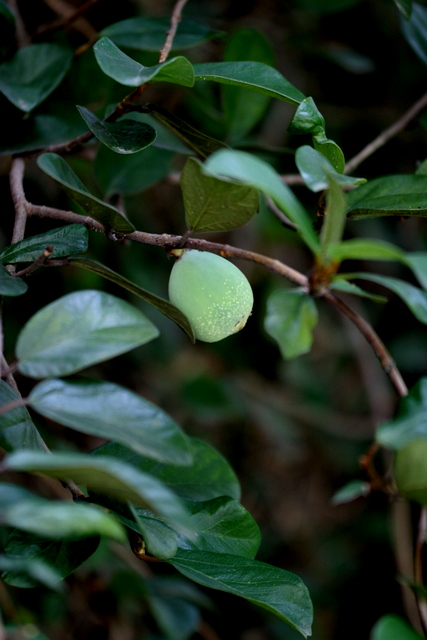

Scientific classification
- Kingdom: Plantae
- Clade: Tracheophytes
- Clade: Angiosperms
- Clade: Eudicots
- Clade: Rosids
- Order: Rosales
- Family: Moraceae
- Genus: Ficus
- Species: F. pumila
- Variety: F. p. var. awkeotsang

Trinomial name
- Ficus pumila var. awkeotsang (Makino) Corner

= Ficus pumila var. awkeotsang =

Variety of climbing fig

Ficus pumila var. awkeotsang, also known as the jelly fig, aiyu, or ai-yu, is a variety of Ficus pumila, and a member of the fig family Moraceae, native to Taiwan. The plant is known for its use in making aiyu jelly.

== Etymology ==
The words "Awkeotsang" (Chinese: 薁蕘欉; Tâi-lô: ò-giô-tsâng) and "Aiyu" (Chinese: 愛玉; pinyin: àiyù) are the Taiwanese Hokkien and Mandarin Chinese forms of the name of the daughter of the individual who discovered the plant's gel-forming properties in 1921.

== Biogeography ==
Ficus pumila var. awkeotsang is the first fig genus presented in Taiwan by Japanese botanist Tomitaro Makino. Later, English botanist E.J.H. Corner classified awkeotsang as a variation of Ficus pumila. There is another variety of Ficus pumila: Ficus pumila var. pumila, also known as creeping fig, is widespread across East Asia.

The fig often grows near a betel nut palm tree with a tall trunk, which fig uses as a support to climb.

Ficus pumila var. awkeotsang is endemic to Taiwan, and has introduced to southern China by humans because of its agricultural importance. After imported to China, Ficus pumila var. awkeotsang pollinators have shifted host to Ficus pumila L. var. pumila.

There are differences between Ficus pumila var. awkeotsang and Ficus pumila L. var. pumila, including leaf shape, syconia size, phenology, and habitat preference. Ficus pumila var. awkeotsang prefers altitudes from 1200 to 1900 meters, while Ficus pumila L. var. pumila prefers lowlands.

== Pollination ==
The relationship of fig and fig wasp is a classic example of obligate mutualism and coevolution. Only pollinating wasps pollinate the figs, while fig wasps only lay their eggs inside the fig ovules.

Ficus pumila is a dioecious species. Male Ficus pumila trees have both male florets and short-styled female florets, which is for feeding the larvae. Female Ficus pumila trees have long-styled female florets, but they are not for pollinator oviposition. A male Ficus pumila produces pollen, feeds and protects fig wasps larvae, while a female produces seeds.

During oviposition, the larvae feed and mature with gall tissue, fig seeds and fig pollen grains.

When female wasps is mature, they leave their original figs and carry pollen to other fig trees.

Pollen grains stick to wasp bodies and fertilise ovules when they enter figs.

== Use ==
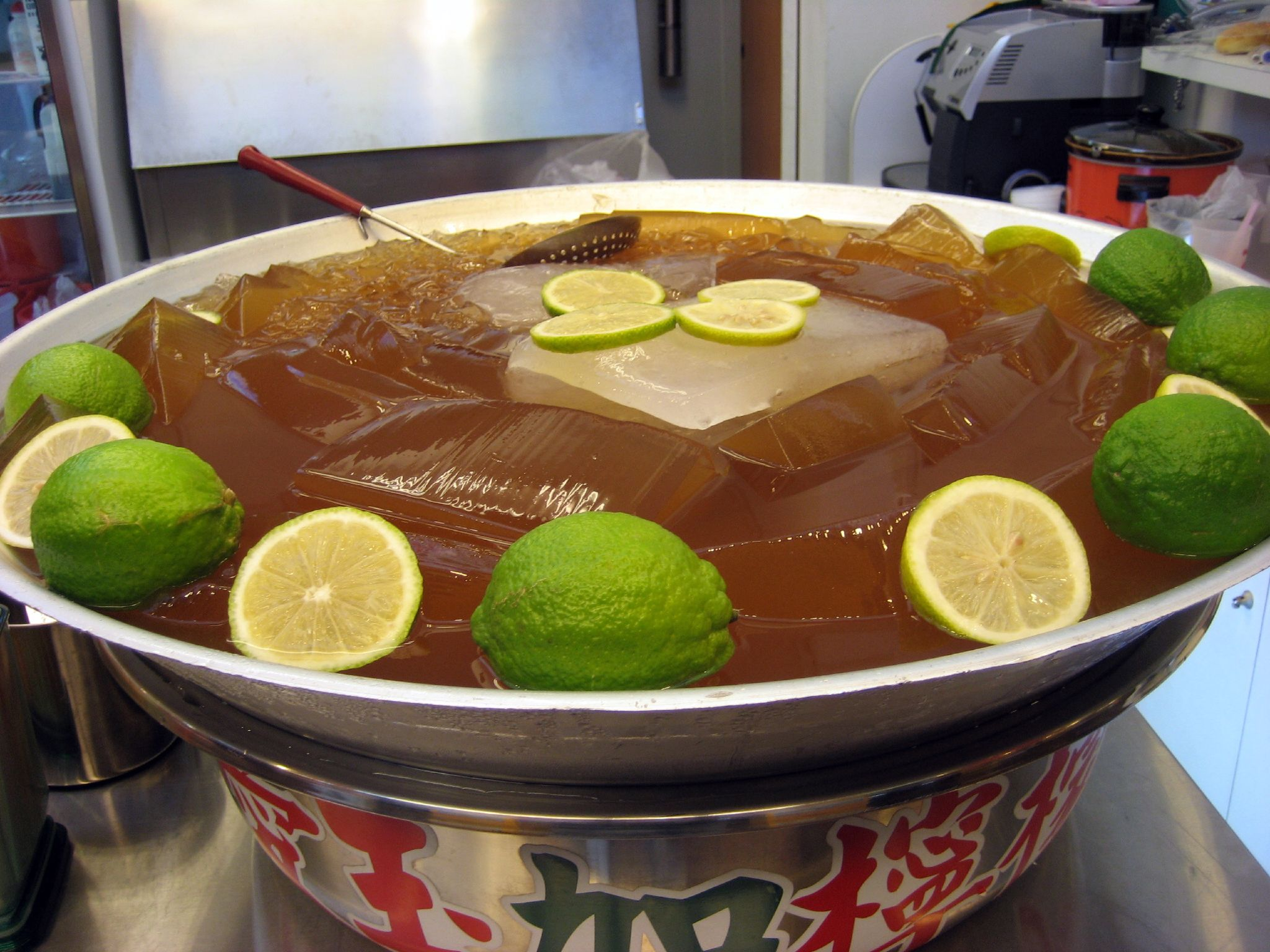
Aiyu jelly

The main use of this plant is its fruit seed, which is harvested to make aiyu jelly in Taiwan (known as ice jelly in Singapore). The jelly, when combined with sweeteners and lemon or lime juice is a favorite snack in Taiwanese night markets, Taiwanese farmers' markets and Singapore hawker centres.

Ficus pumila var. awkeotsang seeds contain pectin, a viscous gelation material. Stirring and extracting the dried seeds with water for 15-20 minutes at room temperature, can obtain the gel easily. It is noteworthy that Aiyu jelly does not require high temperature to form gel, which is different from other gel-forming material.

Aiyu jelly is beneficial for health too. It is able to retard blood glucose release, which can be used as natural blood glucose-controlling components.

== Gallery ==
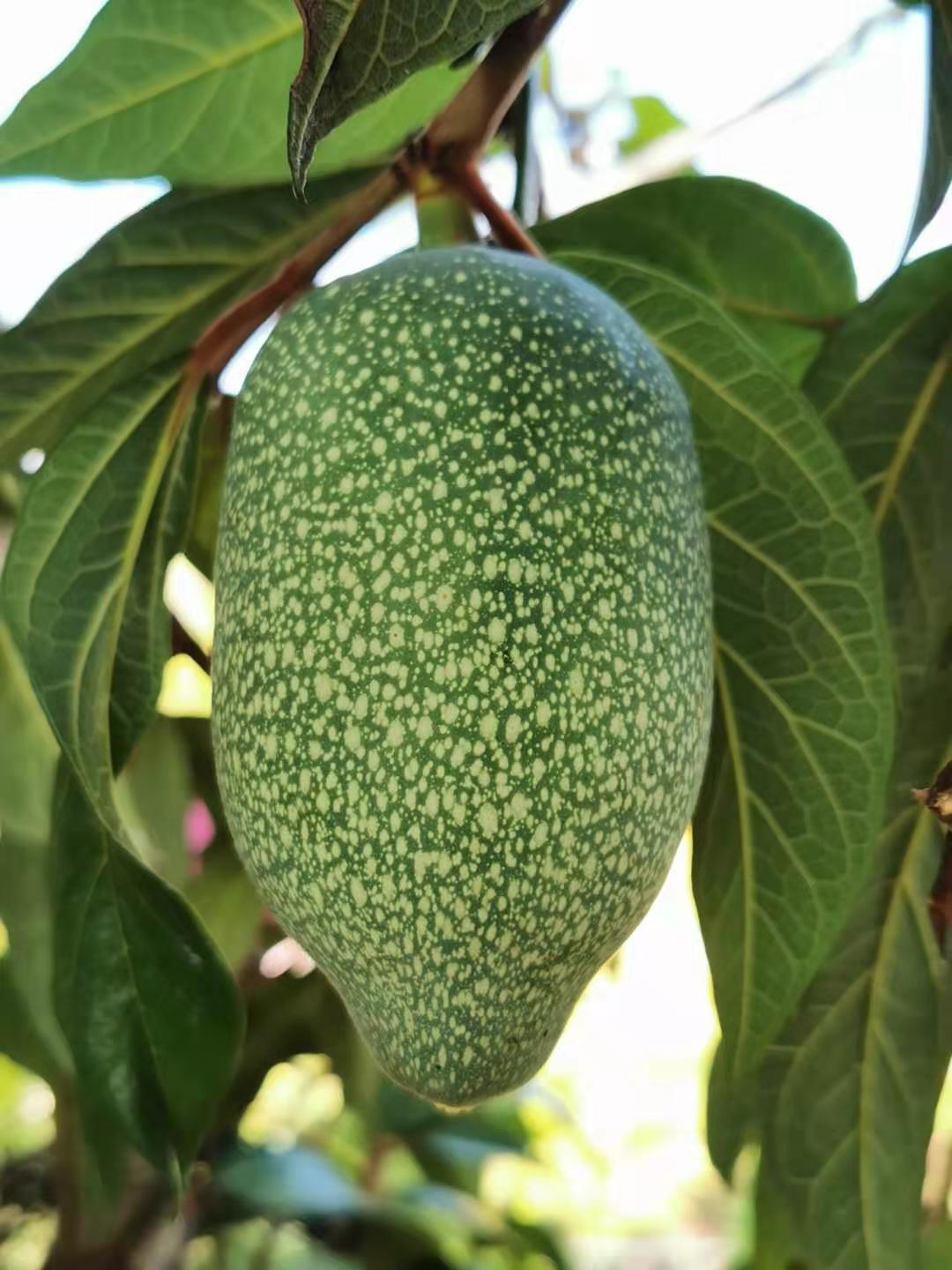
Jelly fig on a tree

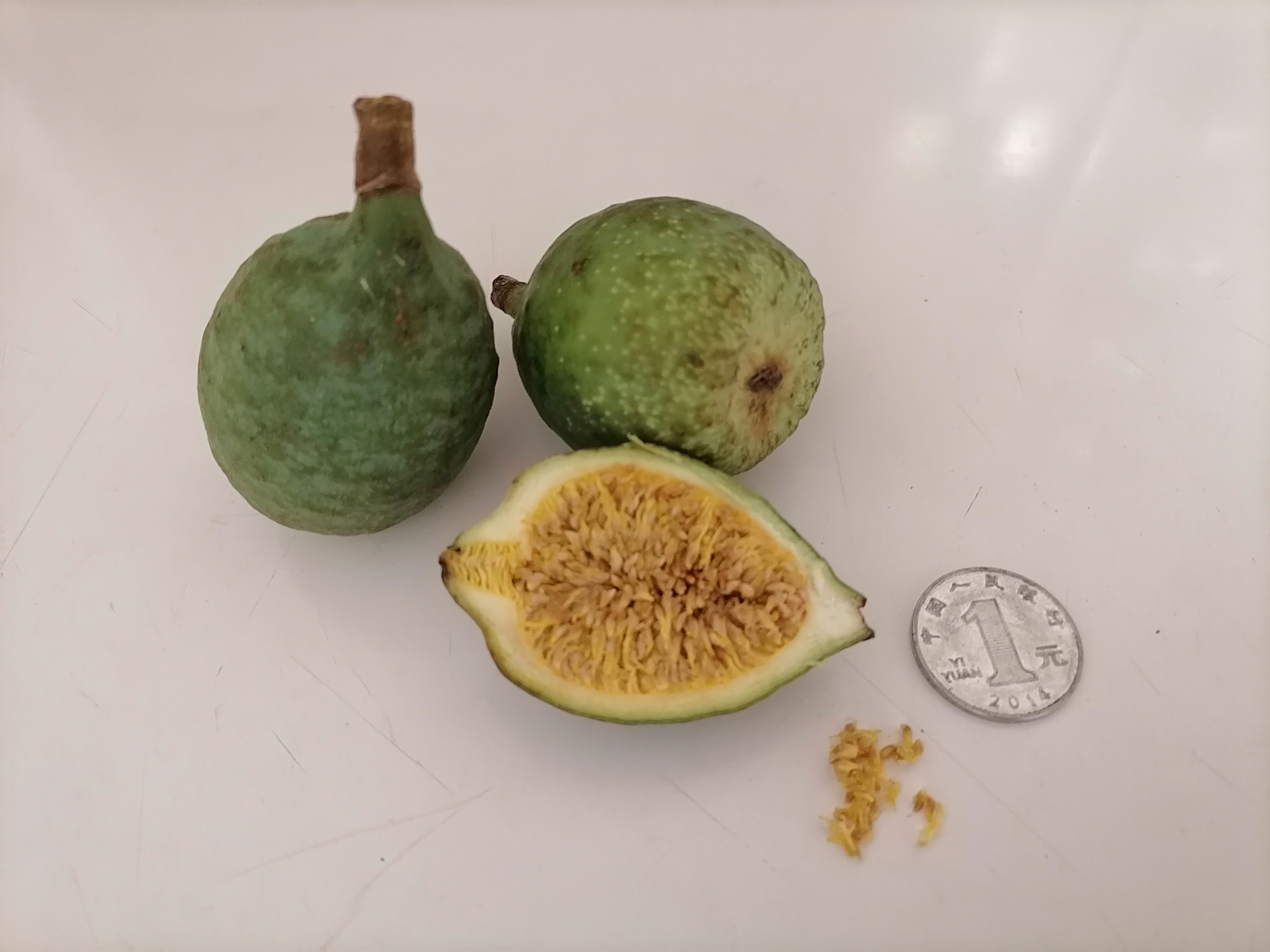
Jelly figs, whole and cut

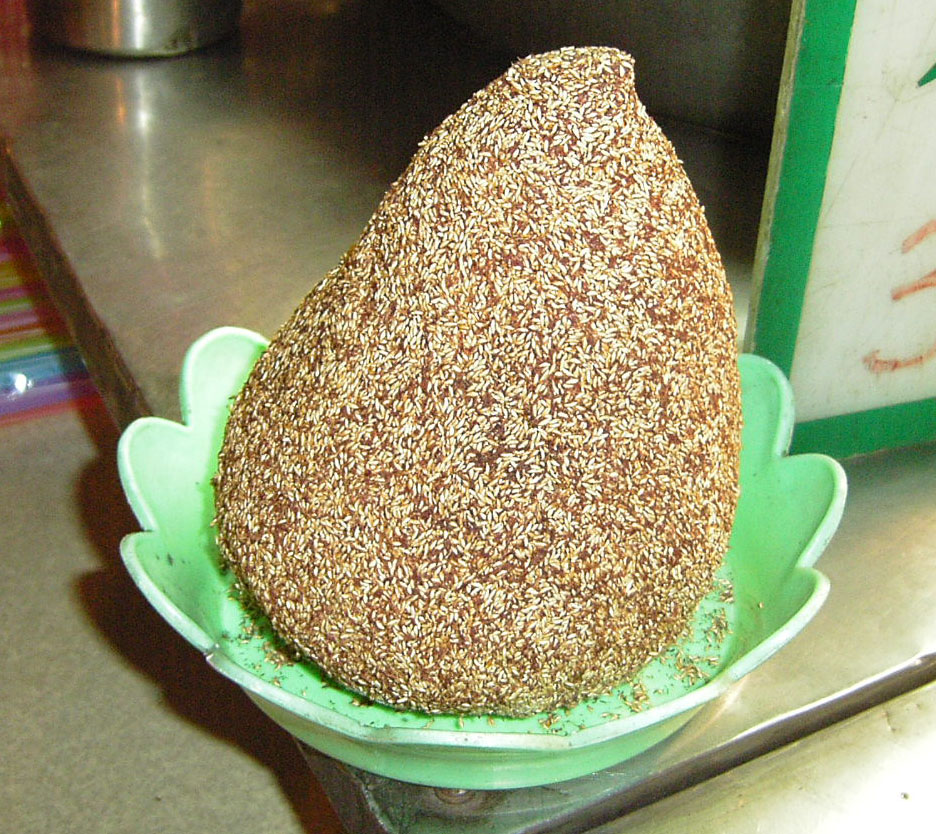
Dried Jelly fig fruit, turned inside out to show the seeds

== See also ==
- Aiyu jelly
- O-aew
- Wiebesia pumilae
