= Aiyu jelly =

Jelly popular in Taiwan and Singapore

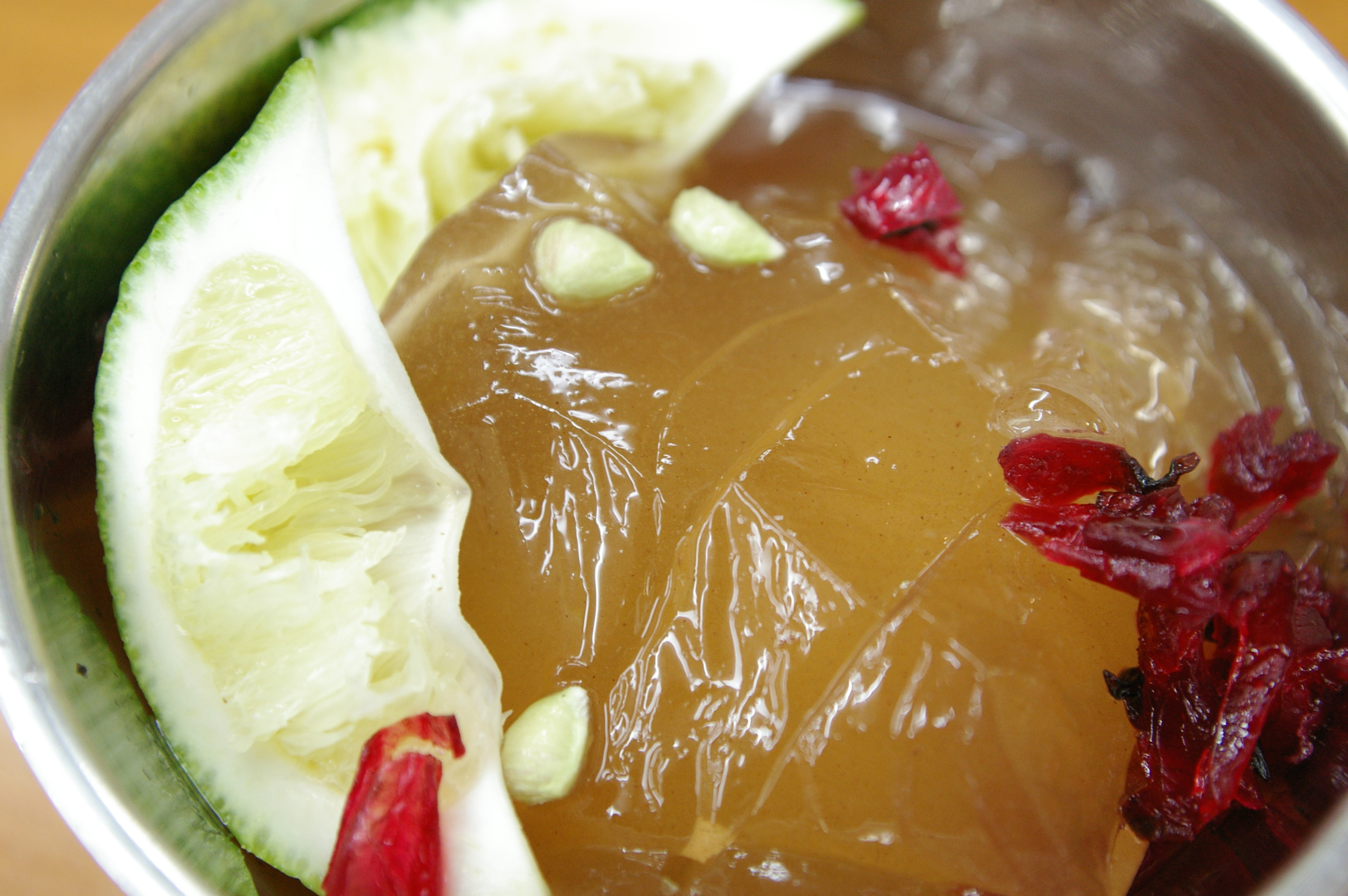
- Aiyu jelly served with a slice of lime and candied roselle
- Alternative names: Ice jelly
- Place of origin: Taiwan
- Main ingredients: Fig seed gel

Aiyu jelly (Chinese: 愛玉冰; pinyin: àiyùbīng; or 愛玉凍; àiyùdòng; or simply 愛玉; àiyù), known in Amoy Hokkien as ogio (Chinese: 薁蕘; Pe̍h-ōe-jī: ò-giô), and as ice jelly in Malaysia and Singapore (Chinese: 文頭雪; pinyin: wéntóu xuě), is a jelly made from the gel from the seeds of the awkeotsang creeping fig found in Taiwan and East Asian countries of the same climates and latitudes. The jelly is not commonly made or found outside of Taiwan, Malaysia, and Singapore, though it can be bought fresh in specialty stores in Japan and canned in Chinatowns. It is also used in Taiwanese cuisine.

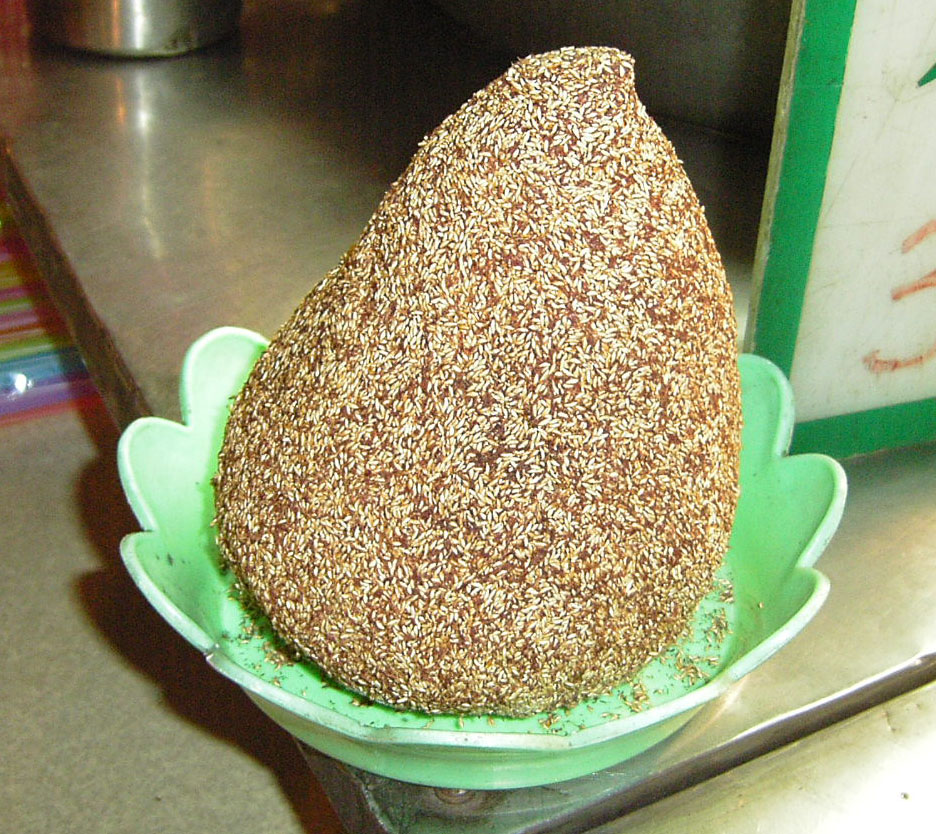
Dried inside out fruit of F. pumila var awkeotsang, ready for use

== Harvesting ==
Fruits of the creeping fig plant resemble large fig fruits the size of small mangos. The figs grow from flowers pollinated by the fig wasp Wiebesia pumilae. and are harvested from September through January just before the fruit ripens to a dark purple. The fruits are then halved and turned inside out to dry over the course of several days. The dry fruits can be sold as is, or dried aiyu seeds (Chinese: 愛玉籽; pinyin: aiyu zi) can then be pulled off the skin and sold separately.

== Jelly making ==
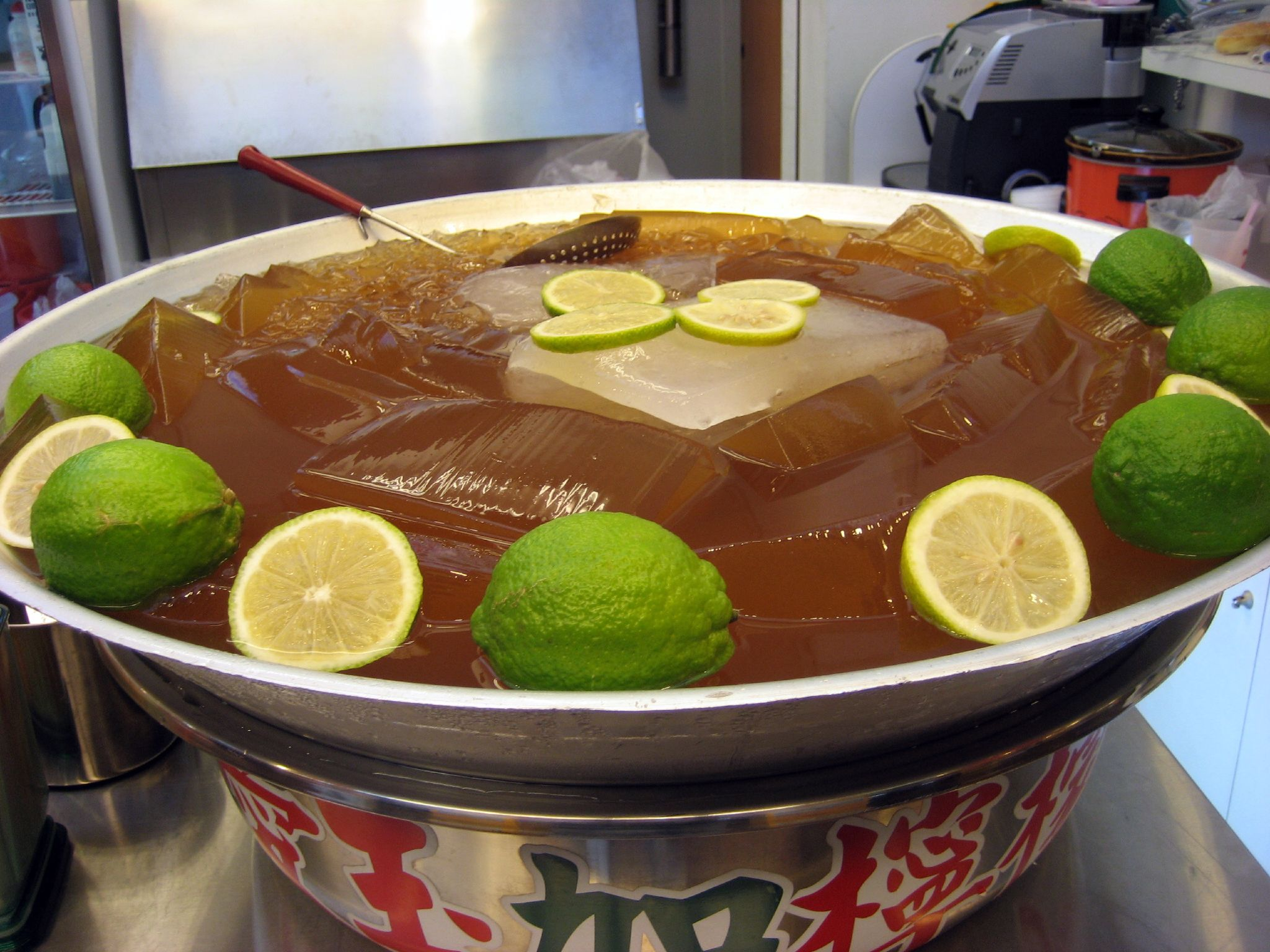
Aiyu jelly displayed with ice and lime halves

The aiyu seeds are placed in a cotton cloth bag, and the bag and its contents are submerged in cold water and rubbed. A slimy gel will be extracted from the bag of aiyu seeds as it is squeezed and massaged. This is known as "washing aiyu" in Chinese (洗愛玉). After several minutes of massaging and washing, no more of the yellowish tea-coloured gel will be extracted, and the contents of the bag are discarded. The washed gel is then allowed to set into a jelly either in a cool location or in the refrigerator. One must keep in mind certain things when making aiyu jelly or else the gel may not set:

1. There must not be any grease in the container or water used to wash or set the gel,
2. Sugar must not be added to the aiyu prior to the setting of the gel,
3. Distilled water must not be used since the gelling depends on the presence of minerals in the water,
4. During washing, the seeds must not be rubbed so hard as to rupture their shells.

Water will slowly seep out of the jelly some time after it sets, and it will turn back to a liquid over the course of several days.

The jelly is usually served with honey and lemon juice but can also be included in other sweetened beverages or shaved ice and is particularly popular as a cool drink in hot summers.

== Chemistry ==
The gelling agent in aiyu seeds is pectin. Pectines are located in the transparent layer on the surface of seeds and not the inside of seeds, which is why they are extracted by washing and rubbing instead of grinding to a powder. The main component of the water extract was found to be LMP (low methoxy pectin), as opposed to high methoxy pectins prevalent in commercially used sources such as apples or citrus peels. LMP gels in presence of divalent cations, which are found in sufficient amount in water (when undistilled), thus causing a creation of jelly.

== See also ==
- Taiwanese cuisine
- List of Taiwanese desserts and snacks
- Night markets in Taiwan
- Climbing fig tofu
- Grass jelly
- Gelatin dessert
- O-aew, a variant of aiyu jelly found in Phuket, Thailand
- Bingfen
