= Yang Shou =

Chinese chancellor

Yang Shou (Chinese: 楊收; died April 11, 868), courtesy name Cangzhi (藏之), formally Baron of Jinyang (晉陽男), was an official of the Chinese Tang dynasty, serving as a chancellor during the reign of Emperor Yizong. He was known for his literary talent as a young man, but subsequently, as chancellor, was accused of corruption. He was thereafter exiled and forced to commit suicide in exile.

== Background and early career ==
It is not known exactly when Yang Shou was born — but he was said to be 25 when he passed the imperial examinations late in Emperor Wenzong's Kaicheng era (836-840), and thus there is some reference to his birth date. His family was originally from Tong Prefecture (同州, in modern Weinan, Shaanxi), and claimed ancestry from the Sui dynasty general Yang Su. His immediate male-line ancestors were said to be Confucian scholars, and his father Yang Yizhi (楊遺直) served as a personnel officer at Hao Prefecture (濠州, in modern Chuzhou, Anhui). At one point, Yang Yizhi became a teaching scholar at Su Prefecture (蘇州, in modern Suzhou, Jiangsu), and therefore settled there, making it Yang Shou's childhood home. Yang Shou was born of Yang Yizhi's second wife Lady Zhangsun, who, in addition to Yang Shou, bore at least one other son, Yang Shou's younger brother Yang Yan (楊嚴), while Yang Yizhi's first wife Lady Yuan bore two sons, Yang Fa (楊發) and Yang Jia (楊假), both older than Yang Shou. (All four brothers would eventually serve in the imperial government.)

Yang Yizhi died when Yang Shou was six, and the household was poor. As Lady Zhangsun was literate, she taught Yang Shou herself. By age 12, Yang Shou understood the Confucian classics well, and was good at writing poetry. He thus became known as the "Divine Child" among the people in his home region. As Lady Zhangsun was a devout Buddhist, Yang Shou followed her in not eating meat, although Lady Zhangsun made the remark, "You may have meat when you eventually become a Jinshi [(i.e., someone who passed the imperial examinations)]." However, because his older brother Yang Jia did not pass the imperial examinations for a while, Yang Shou did not want to pass before Yang Jia did, and therefore delayed in submitting himself for imperial examinations. Only after Yang Jia did so did Yang Shou submit himself for imperial examinations at the capital Chang'an, late in the Kaicheng era, and he passed in the Jinshi class on the first try, at age 25.

At that time, Yang Fa was serving as an assistant to the prefect of Run Prefecture (潤州, in modern Zhenjiang, Jiangsu), and therefore moved the household to Jinling; therefore, after Yang Shou passed the imperial examinations, he decided to head home to Jinling. On the way, though, when he went through Huainan Circuit (淮南, headquartered in modern Yangzhou, Jiangsu), then-military governor (Jiedushi) of Huainan, the former chancellor Du Cong, invited Yang Shou to serve on his staff. Later, when Du was recalled to Chang'an to serve as chancellor and the director of finances, he invited Yang to serve as a traveling reviewer under him. Subsequently, after Du was sent out of the capital to serve as the military governor of Dongchuan Circuit (東川, headquartered in modern Mianyang, Sichuan), he invited Yang to serve under him as chief secretary, and later, when Du was transferred to Xichuan Circuit (西川, headquartered in modern Chengdu, Sichuan), Yang continued to serve under him in the same capacity.

== During Emperor Xuānzong's reign ==
By the reign of Emperor Wenzong's uncle Emperor Xuānzong, the chancellor Ma Zhi wanted to recall Yang Shou to Chang'an to serve as the sheriff of nearby Weinan County (渭南, in modern Weinan), and to also serve as an imperial censor and an assistant scholar at Jixian Institute (集賢院). Yang declined, however, under the rationale that given that his older brother Yang Jia had not received an office nearly as prestigious, he was not willing to accept it first. Ma approved of his behavior and allowed him to continue to serve on Du Cong's staff, and instead bestowed those offices on Yang Shou's younger brother Yang Yan. Subsequently, Yang Yan served as chief secretary under the former chancellor Zhou Chi at Dongchuan Circuit, but after Zhou died soon thereafter, Du invited Yang Yan to serve on his staff as well, as his assistant in his role as governor (觀察使, Guanchashi), so the brothers served together. Soon thereafter, Yang Jia, who was then serving as assistant to the governor of Zhexi Circuit (浙西, headquartered in modern Zhenjiang), was recalled to Chang'an to serve as imperial censor with the title of Jiancha Yushi (監察御史); Yang Shou was also recalled to Chang'an to serve as Jiancha Yushi; it was unprecedented at the time that two brothers would serve simultaneously as Jiancha Yushi.

When Pei Xiu served as chancellor, as he knew that Yang Shou had a good understanding of the Confucian classics, he made Yang Taichang Boshi (太常博士), a scholar at the minister of worship (太常寺, Taichang Si). Subsequently, when Lady Zhangsun died, Yang Shou left governmental service and went back to Su Prefecture to observe a mourning period for her. Once the mourning period was over, the former chancellor Cui Xuan, who was then serving as the military governor of Huainan, invited Yang to serve under him as assistant governor (觀察支使, Guancha Zhishi). Yang was later recalled to Chang'an to serve as an imperial censor with the title of Shi Yushi (侍御史), but later was sent out to the eastern capital Luoyang to serve as Zhifang Yuanwailang (職方員外郎), a low-level official at the ministry of defense (兵部, Bingbu). Yet later, when the chancellor Xiahou Zi also served as the director of finances, he had Yang serve as his assistant in that capacity. Yang later served as Sixun Yuanwailang (司勛員外郎), a low-level official at the ministry of civil service affairs (吏部, Libu), as well as the magistrate of Chang'an County, one of the two counties making up the capital. Subsequently, he petitioned for permission for him and his brothers to bury their parents, whose caskets had not been buried, near Luoyang, and he was given permission to do so. About 1,000 people attended the burial. At that time, both Du Cong and Xiahou were at Luoyang, and Du and Xiahou jointly submitted a recommendation of Yang Shou to the chancellors. Then-leading chancellor Linghu Tao thus commissioned Yang as Kubu Langzhong (庫部郎中), a supervisory official at the ministry of census, as well as imperial scholar (翰林學士, Hanlin Xueshi), in charge of drafting edicts. Yang was subsequently made Zhongshu Sheren (中書舍人), a mid-level official at the legislative bureau of government (中書省, Zhongshu Sheng), and yet later deputy minister of defense (兵部侍郎, Bingbu Shilang) and chief imperial scholar (翰林學士承旨, Hanlin Xueshi Chengzhi).

== During Emperor Yizong's reign ==
Early in the reign of Emperor Xuānzong's son Emperor Yizong, the eunuch Yang Xuanjie (楊玄价) became the powerful commander of the Left Shence Army (左神策軍). As Yang Shou shared the same surname, Yang Xuanjie associated with him and recommended him to Emperor Yizong. In 863, Yang Shou was therefore given the designation Tong Zhongshu Menxia Pingzhangshi (同中書門下平章事), making him a chancellor de facto.

After Yang Shou became chancellor, it was said that he began to live luxuriously, and members of his household, including the guards and the servants, were openly demanding bribes. His reputation therefore suffered. When he gave his daughter in marriage to the son of the official Pei Tan (裴坦), the household items Yang gave her as part of her dowry included decorations of jade and rhinoceros horns, drawing Pei's anger for their overly luxurious nature, and Pei destroyed them.

In 865, with Tang locked into frequent military confrontations with Dali in the southwest, but with the military supplies often having difficulty reaching the southwest border, Yang suggested that a strong military presence and a supply base be set up at Jiangxi Circuit (江西, headquartered in modern Nanchang, Jiangxi), and that it be transformed from a circuit governed by a governor to one governed by a military governor (to be renamed Zhennan Circuit (鎮南)). Emperor Yizong approved. Subsequently, Emperor Yizong, because he favored this proposal greatly, rewarded Yang with the titles of You Pushe (右僕射), director of Taiqing (太清宮) and Taiwei (太微宮) Palaces, and imperial scholar at Hongwen Pavilion (弘文院), and created him the Baron of Jinyang.

Because it was due to Yang Xuanjie's recommendation that Yang Shou was made chancellor, Yang Xuanjie, who accepted bribes from regional governors, often interceded for those governors with Yang Shou. Yang Shou was not able to comply with all of Yang Xuanjie's requests, drawing Yang Xuanjie's anger. Because of this, in 866, Yang Shou was removed from his chancellor post and made the governor of Xuanshe Circuit (宣歙, in modern Xuancheng, Anhui). As Yang Shou was reporting to Xuanshe, he gave a donation at Huayue Temple (華嶽廟, in modern Weinan), asking the priests there to priest for him. The magistrate of Huayin County, which Huayue Temple was in, subsequently submitted a false report that Yang Shou was using witchcraft. Further, then-leading chancellor Wei Baoheng made an accusation that Yang's commissioning of Yan Zhuan (嚴譔) as military governor of Zhennan was after Yan had submitted a large bribe, and also that Yang embezzled funds intended to be used for shipbuilding. In 867, Emperor Yizong thus further demoted Yang to be the military advisor to the prefect of Duan Prefecture (端州, in modern Zhaoqing, Guangdong). However, apparently before Yang had a chance to report to Duan Prefecture, as he was going through Jianling, Emperor Yizong sent the eunuch Guo Quanmu (郭全穆) to track him down and order him to commit suicide. Before Yang did so, he asked Guo for permission to submit one final petition to Emperor Yizong. Guo agreed, and Yang wrote a petition in which he thanked Emperor Yizong, faulted himself, and begged for mercy on behalf of his brother Yang Yan. Emperor Yizong, upon receiving the petition, was touched, and subsequently, when some 11 of Yang's key followers were exiled, Yang Yan was spared. Three years later, he restored Yang's titles. Yang's sons Yang Ju (楊鉅) and Yang Lin (楊鏻) later served in the imperial government, and his nephew Yang She (Yang Yan's son) later served as a chancellor at the very end of the Tang dynasty, during the reign of Emperor Ai, as well as of the succeeding Later Liang.

== Notes and references ==
- Old Book of Tang, vol. 177.
- New Book of Tang, vol. 184.
- Zizhi Tongjian, vols. 250, 251.
