= Pei Tan (9th-century Tang chancellor) =

Pei Tan (裴坦) (died June 25, 874), courtesy name Zhijin (知進), was an official of the Chinese Tang dynasty, serving briefly as a chancellor during the reign of Emperor Xizong.

== Background ==
It is not known when Pei Tan was born. He was from The Middle Juan Pei of Pei clan of Hedong, ultimately claiming ancestry from the mythical emperor Zhuanxu. The traceable parts of Pei Tan's ancestry included officials of Han dynasty, Cao Wei, Northern Wei, Northern Zhou, Sui dynasty, and Tang dynasty. Pei Tan's grandfather Pei Gao (裴郜) served as a prefectural secretary general, and his father Pei Ai (裴乂) served as the governor (觀察使, Guanchashi) of Fujian Circuit (福建, headquartered in modern Fuzhou, Fujian).

== Prior to chancellorship ==
After Pei Tan passed the imperial examinations in the Jinshi class — although when that occurred is not known — the official Shen Chuanshi (沈傳師), who was then the governor of Xuanshe Circuit (宣歙, headquartered in modern Xuancheng, Anhui), invited Pei to serve on his staff. Pei Tan was later recalled to the capital Chang'an to serve as Zuo Shiyi (左拾遺), a low-level advisory official at the examination bureau of government (門下省, Menxia Sheng), as well as an editor of the imperial history. He later served as the prefect of Chu Prefecture (楚州, in modern Huai'an, Jiangsu).

Later, during the time that Linghu Tao was the leading chancellor, Linghu recommended Pei Tan to serve as Zhifang Langzhong (職方郎中), a supervisory official at the ministry of civil service affairs (吏部, Libu), and be put in charge of drafting edicts. Another chancellor, Pei Xiu, however, vehemently opposed, to no avail. (The reason for Pei Xiu's opposition is not stated in history.) The customs of the time dictated that when an official in charge of drafting edicts were to be installed, four chancellors would congratulate him and place a bench in their office to allow him to sit. When Pei Tan met Pei Xiu at this ceremony, he thanked Pei Xiu. Pei Xiu, however, reacted angrily, stating, "This was the action of Chancellor Linghu. What did I, Pei Xiu, have to do with this?" Pei Xiu then had his attendants bring a litter, got on the litter, and left. The administrators who saw this were deeply shocked, believing that no official, ever since the start of the dynasty, had been subjected to such humiliation as Pei Tan had been.

Pei Tan later successively as the deputy minister of rites (禮部侍郎, Libu Shilang), governor of Jiangxi Circuit (江西, headquartered in modern Nanchang, Jiangxi), and prefect of Hua Prefecture (華州, in modern Weinan, Shaanxi). At some point, he must have also served as Shangshu Zuo Cheng (尚書左丞), one of the secretaries general at the executive bureau (尚書省, Shangshu Sheng), for it was during that time that his son married the daughter of the chancellor Yang Shou. When his daughter-in-law's household items, which were given as dowry, arrived at the Pei household, however, Pei saw that many of them were decorated with rhinoceros horns and jade. This display of luxury angered him and said that it would destroy his family tradition for being frugal, and he had them destroyed.

== Chancellorship ==
In 874, during the reign of Emperor Xizong, Pei Tan was recalled from Hua Prefecture to serve as Zhongshu Shilang (中書侍郎), the deputy head of the legislative bureau (中書省, Zhongshu Sheng); he was also given the designation Tong Zhongshu Menxia Pingzhangshi (同中書門下平章事), making him a chancellor de facto. He died three months later, while still serving as chancellor.

== Notes and references ==
- New Book of Tang, vol. 182.
- Zizhi Tongjian, vols. 251, 252.
