= Li Hui (Tang dynasty) =

Li Hui (李回), né Li Chan (李躔), original courtesy name Zhaohui (昭回), later changed to Zhaodu (昭度), formally Duke Wenyi of Longxi (隴西文懿公), was a Chinese politician of the Chinese Tang dynasty, serving as a chancellor during the reign of Emperor Wuzong.

== Background and early career ==
It is not known when Li Chan was born. He was a member of Tang dynasty's imperial Li clan, being a descendant of Li Hu (李虎), the grandfather of Tang's founding emperor Emperor Gaozu who was a general during Northern Zhou and carried the title of Duke of Tang, through Li Hu's son Li Yi (李禕) the Duke of Changping. (As Emperor Gaozu, after founding Tang, posthumously created Li Yi the Prince of Xun, Li Yi's branch of the imperial clan line became known as the Prince of Xun Branch.) Li Chan was a sixth-generation descendant of Li Yi's son Li Shuliang (李叔良) the Prince of Changping. Both Li Chan's grandfather Li Jun'e (李峻崿) and father Li Ruxian (李如仙) served as county magistrates.

Early in the Changqing era (821–824) of Emperor Muzong, Li Chan passed the imperial examinations in the Jinshi class, and he later passed a special imperial examination for those with good tactics. He thereafter served on the staffs of military governors (jiedushi) of Yicheng Circuit (義成, headquartered in modern Anyang, Henan) and then Huainan Circuit (淮南, headquartered in modern Yangzhou, Jiangsu). He was later recalled to the capital Chang'an, initially to be the census officer at the Jingzhao Municipality (京兆, i.e., the Chang'an region) government, and then as the officer in charge of military rolls. He was later promoted to be Bujue (補闕), a low-level advisory official in the imperial government, as well as imperial chronicler (起居郎, Qiju Lang). It was said that he was capable in all matters he handled, and particularly impressed the chancellor Li Deyu. He was later made Zhifang Yuanwailang (職方員外郎), a low-level official at the ministry of defense (兵部, Bingbu), but was also put in charge of handling matters for the ministry of census (戶部, Hubu). He later served as Libu Yuanwailang (吏部員外郎), a low-level official at the ministry of civil service affairs (吏部, Libu), but was also put in charge of serving as assisting the minister directly. Yet later he served as Xingbu Yuanwailang (刑部員外郎), a low-level official at the ministry of justice (刑部, Xingbu), but was also put in charge of the administrative affairs of the Office of Imperial Censors (御史臺, Yushi Tai). Early in the Kaicheng era (836–840) of Emperor Muzong's son Emperor Wenzong, he was promoted to be Kubu Langzhong (庫部郎中), a supervisory official at the ministry of census, and was also put in charge of drafting imperial edicts. He was then promoted to be Zhongshu Sheren (中書舍人), a mid-level official at the legislative bureau of government (中書省, Zhongshu Sheng).

== During Emperor Wuzong's reign ==
Emperor Wenzong died in 840 and was succeeded by his brother Emperor Wuzong—and as Emperor Wuzong was named Li Chan (李瀍), albeit a different character than Li Chan's name, Li Chan changed his name to Li Hui to observe naming taboo. Li Deyu became lead chancellor, and thereafter, Li Hui became deputy minister of public works (工部侍郎, Gongbu Shilang), then deputy minister of census (戶部侍郎, Hubu Shilang). In 843, he was also made deputy chief imperial censor (御史中丞, Yushi Zhongcheng).

As of 843, Emperor Wuzong was preparing a major campaign against the warlord Liu Zhen, who had taken control of Zhaoyi Circuit (昭義, headquartered in modern Changzhi, Shanxi) without imperial sanction after the death of his adoptive father (and biological uncle) Liu Congjian, who had served as Zhaoyi's military governor. Concerned that the three de facto independent circuits north of the Yellow River—Weibo (魏博, headquartered in modern Handan, Hebei), then governed by He Hongjing; Chengde (成德, headquartered in modern Shijiazhuang, Hebei), then governed by Wang Yuankui; and Lulong (盧龍, headquartered in modern Beijing), then governed by Zhang Zhongwu—would side with Zhaoyi, Emperor Wuzong sent Li Hui to those three circuits to express to them that the imperial government had no intent to intervene in their internal affairs, so as long as they sided with the imperial government in the campaign against Zhaoyi. It was said that Li Hui was capable in speaking and persuasion, and all three circuits accepted the imperial orders. (It was also said that part of Li Hui's mission was to alleviate the adversarial relationship between Zhang and one of the imperial generals, Liu Mian (劉沔) the military governor of Hedong Circuit (河東, headquartered in modern Taiyuan, Shanxi). Li Hui's biographies in the Old Book of Tang and the New Book of Tang indicated that that part of the mission was successful, but the Zizhi Tongjian indicated that he was unsuccessful, causing Emperor Wuzong to eventually transfer Liu Mian away to avoid creating complications in the Zhaoyi campaign.)

While the Zhaoyi campaign was going on, Emperor Wuzong's administration was also dealing with Dangxiang incursions. Under Li Deyu's proposal, which Emperor Wuzong accepted, Emperor Wuzong's son Li Qi (李岐) the Prince of Yan was nominally made the supreme commander over six circuits (i.e., the six circuits affected by the Dangxiang incursions) and chief comforter of the Danxiang. Li Hui was made the deputy commander, to be in actual command of the operations, working with Zheng Ya (鄭亞), who was made the secretary general.

In 844, after Liu Zhen was killed by his own officer Guo Yi (郭誼), who then surrendered Zhaoyi to the imperial forces, Li Deyu wanted to use the opportunity to carry out reprisals against his political enemies, the former chancellors Li Zongmin and Niu Sengru, and therefore, even though no evidence was found at Zhaoyi that Li Zongmin and Niu were in secret communications with Liu Congjian, had Liu Congjian's secretary Zheng Qing (鄭慶) claim that Liu Congjian would burn letters from Li Zongmin and Niu after reading them. Emperor Wuzong had Zheng report to the Office of the Imperial Censors, and subsequently, Li Hui and Zheng Ya, handling the investigations, indicated that they believed Zheng Qing's accusations. In anger, Emperor Wuzong had Li Zongmin and Niu exiled.

In 845, Li Hui was made Zhongshu Shilang (中書侍郎), the deputy head of the legislative bureau, and chancellor de facto with the designation Tong Zhongshu Menxia Pingzhangshi (同中書門下平章事). He also continued to oversee the ministry of census.

== During Emperor Xuānzong's reign ==
Emperor Wuzong died in 846 and was succeeded by his uncle Emperor Xuānzong. As Emperor Xuānzong despised Li Deyu for his hold on power, he had Li Deyu removed from his chancellor post and sent out of the capital. Li Hui, meanwhile, remained as chancellor and oversaw the building of Emperor Wuzong's tomb, but in 847 was also sent out of the capital to serve as the military governor of Xichuan Circuit (西川, headquartered in modern Chengdu, Sichuan). That winter, with Li Deyu accused of having wrongly killed Wu Xiang (吳湘) on charges of corruption and forced marriage with a commoner—a case that both Li Hui and Zheng Ya were both involved in reviewing and affirming the death sentence of—Li Hui was demoted to be the governor (觀察使, Guanchashi) of Hunan Circuit (湖南, headquartered in modern Changsha, Hunan) and prefect of its capital Tan Prefecture (in modern Changsha, Hunan). Emperor Xuānzong was then set to further give him the empty title of Taizi Binke (太子賓客), an advisor to the Crown Prince (there being no crown prince at the time) and having his office at the eastern capital Luoyang, when an imperial attendant objected to it as being an overly lenient punishment. Li Hui was thereafter demoted to be the prefect of Fu Prefecture (撫州, in modern Fuzhou, Jiangxi). (It was from Emperor Xuānzong's edict that it could be attested that Li Hui carried the title of Duke of Longxi, which was not otherwise mentioned in his biographies.)

== Divergent accounts of late career and death ==
It is from this point on that the Old Book of Tang and the New Book of Tang accounts substantially diverged as to the rest of Li Hui's career and life. According to the Old Book of Tang, after the main chancellors of Emperor Xuānzong's reign, Bai Minzhong and Linghu Tao, were no longer chancellors—which would probably mean sometime around 861, during the reign of Emperor Xuānzong's son Emperor Yizong, as that was the end of Bai's second term as chancellor, Li Hui was recalled to Chang'an to serve as the minister of defense (兵部尚書, Bingbu Shangshu), and then again sent out to Xichuan to serve as its military governor. He died there and was given posthumous honors, including the posthumous name of Wenyi (文懿, "civil and benevolent"). The New Book of Tang, however, indicated that Li Hui died at Fu Prefecture, and that in 855 Emperor Xuānzong, still emperor at that point, posthumously restored the offices of governor of Hunan and ministry of defense to him.

== Notes and references ==
- Old Book of Tang, vol. 173.
- New Book of Tang, vol. 131.
- Zizhi Tongjian, vols. 247, 248.
