= Wei Mo =

Tang dynasty chancellor

Wei Mo (魏謩 or 魏謨; 793–858), courtesy name Shenzhi (申之), was an official of the Chinese Tang dynasty, who served as a chancellor during the reign of Emperor Xuānzong.

== Background ==
Wei Mo was born in 793, during the reign of Emperor Dezong. He was a fifth-generation descendant of the famed early Tang chancellor Wei Zheng, who had served a distinguished career under Emperor Taizong. Wei Mo's great-grandfather Wei Yin (魏殷), grandfather Wei Ming (魏明), and father—whose name was variously given as Wei Feng (魏馮) or Wei Ping (魏憑) all served as county magistrates.

== During Emperor Wenzong's reign ==
Wei Mo passed the imperial examinations in the Jinshi class in 833, during the reign of Emperor Dezong's great-great-grandson Emperor Wenzong. When the official Yang Rushi (楊汝士) served as the prefect of Tong Prefecture (同州, in modern Weinan, Shaanxi), he invited Wei to serve as his secretary in his capacity as Tong Prefecture's defender. Later, when Yang was recalled to the capital Chang'an, he recommended Wei to serve as You Shiyi (右拾遺), a low-level advisory official at the legislative bureau of government (中書省, Zhongshu Sheng). Knowing that Wei was a descendant of Wei Zheng's, Emperor Wenzong treated him specially. He was also much favored by the chancellors Li Guyan, Li Jue, and Yang Sifu.

After the Ganlu Incident—an incident in 835 in which Emperor Wenzong and his close associates Li Xun and Zheng Zhu unsuccessfully tried to slaughter the powerful eunuchs—Li Xun's associate Li Xiaoben (李孝本), a member of the Tang imperial Li clan, was executed. Li Xiaoben's family members were seized to be servants in the army, but under Emperor Wenzong's orders, Li Xiaoben's two daughters were taken into the palace, leading to belief that Emperor Wenzong wanted to take them as concubines. Wei Mo submitted a petition in which he pointed out that even the suspicion that Emperor Wenzong would consider it—which would be a violation against Confucian regulations against endogamy—would appear inappropriate. Upon receiving Wei's petition, Emperor Wenzong immediately sent Li Xiaoben's daughters out of the palace, promoted Wei to the higher office of You Bujue (右補闕), and issued an edict in which he greatly praised Wei and compared him to his ancestor Wei Zheng.

In 838, Wei was promoted to be an imperial chronicler with the title Qiju Sheren (起居舍人). When Wei met with Emperor Wenzong to thank him, Emperor Wenzong asked him to submit Wei Zheng's old writing tablet. The chancellor Zheng Tan made the comment, "It was the man, not his tablet." Emperor Wenzong, however, responded, "I am requesting the tablet in the spirit of the poem Gantang [(甘棠)]." (The Gantang was a poem in which the people of Zhou dynasty memorialized the great early Zhou statesman Ji Shi the Duke of Shao.)

In 839, Wei was given the additional title of Jianyi Daifu (諫議大夫), and continued to serve as Qiju Sheren. On one occasion, Emperor Wenzong requested that Wei submit the records that he had written of Emperor Wenzong's acts, claiming that by reviewing them, he would be able to review his own actions. Wei pointed out that historians were supposed to record with honesty, and that if they had to be concerned about whether emperors would be pleased or not about the historians' views of their actions, the historians could not record with honesty. Emperor Wenzong relented and did not insist on viewing the records.

== During Emperor Wuzong's reign ==
Emperor Wenzong died in 840 and was succeeded by his brother Emperor Wuzong. Almost immediately after, Li Jue and Yang Sifu were removed from their chancellor positions and sent out of Chang'an, and their political rival Li Deyu became the leading chancellor. As Wei Mo had been favored by Li Jue and Yang, he was sent out of the capital as well to serve as the prefect of Fen Prefecture (汾州, in modern Linfen, Shanxi). Subsequently, after Li Jue and Yang were further demoted and exiled, Wei was further demoted to be the secretary general of Xin Prefecture (信州, in modern Shangrao, Jiangxi).

== During Emperor Xuānzong's reign ==
After Emperor Wuzong died in 846 and was succeeded by his uncle Emperor Xuānzong, Li Deyu, in turn, lost power, and Bai Minzhong became the lead chancellor. Thereafter, Wei Mo was promoted to be the prefect of Ying Prefecture (郢州, in modern Wuhan, Hubei), and then moved even closer to the capital to be the prefect of Shang Prefecture (商州, in modern Shangluo, Shaanxi). In 848, he was recalled to Chang'an to serve as imperial attendant (給事中, Jishizhong), and then to be deputy chief imperial censor (御史中丞, Yushi Zhongcheng). While serving as deputy chief imperial censor, he submitted an accusation of corruption against Emperor Xuānzong's brother-in-law Du Zhongli (杜中立), which shocked the nobles and caused them to fear him. Later, he was made the deputy minister of census (戶部侍郎, Hubu Shilang) as well, and in that capacity was to serve as the director of taxation. He submitted a petition in which he pointed out that it would be inappropriate for him to oversee matters of money and continue to serve as censor, and by his request, he was relieved of his censor duties.

In 851, Emperor Xuānzong made Wei a chancellor de facto with the designation Tong Zhongshu Menxia Pingzhangshi (同中書門下平章事), and continued to have him oversee taxation. At that time, Emperor Xuānzong was already relatively old (age 41), but had not designated a crown prince. Given his sensitivity about the matter, however, the officials largely did not dare to speak to him about the subject. When Wei met with Emperor Xuānzong to thank him for the commission, he took the chance to point out that that was the main worry that he had about Emperor Xuānzong's governance. While Emperor Xuānzong did not thereafter create a crown prince, the people at the time were nevertheless impressed with Wei.

In 852, Li Ye (李業) the military governor of Hedong Circuit (河東, headquartered in modern Taiyuan, Shanxi) caused disturbances on the border by allowing the Han people to pillage the non-Han and also by killing those non-Han who had surrendered. However, Li Ye was not punished because he had backing of powerful people at court. Only Wei dared to submit an accusation against Li Ye, asking that he be relieved of his duties entirely; Emperor Xuānzong did not do so, but replaced Li Ye with Lu Jun (盧均) and transferred Li Ye to Yicheng Circuit (義成, headquartered in modern Anyang, Henan).

While serving as chancellor, Wei was also in charge of editing the history of Emperor Wenzong's reign, and after he submitted a 40-volume history of Emperor Wenzong's reign, he and the key editors under him were rewarded. It was said that while the chancellors spoke with Emperor Xuānzong on policy issues, they all spoke in roundabout manners in order not to displease the emperor, but Wei dared to speak his mind with no regard for the such. It was said that Emperor Xuānzong often commented, "Wei Mo acts in the same way his ancestor [(i.e., Wei Zheng)] did, and I respect him greatly." However, it was also said that because of this, Wei was resented by the lead chancellor Linghu Tao. In 857, Wei was therefore sent out of Chang'an to serve as the military governor of Xichuan Circuit (西川, headquartered in modern Chengdu, Sichuan, continuing to carry the Tong Zhongshu Menxia Pingzhangshi title as an honorary title. In 858, when Wei grew ill, he requested to be replaced. Emperor Xuānzong was set to recall him to Chang'an to serve as the minister of defense (兵部尚書, Bingbu Shangshu), but Wei, citing his illness, requested an office with little responsibilities, and therefore was made acting You Pushe (右僕射) and advisor to the Crown Prince. He died in winter 858 and was given posthumous honors.

== Notes and references ==
- Old Book of Tang, vol. 176.
- New Book of Tang, vol. 97.
- Zizhi Tongjian, vols. 245, 246, 249.
