= Lu Shang =

Lu Shang (盧商) (789–859), courtesy name Weichen (為臣), formally the Duke of Fanyang (范陽公), was an official of the Chinese Tang dynasty, briefly serving as chancellor during the reign of Emperor Xuānzong.

== Background and early career ==
Lu Shang was born in 789, during the reign of Emperor Dezong. His family was from "The second house of northern ancestry" (北祖第二房)of the prominent Lu clan of Fanyang. Lu Shang's grandfather Lu Ang (盧昂) served as a prefectural prefect, and his father Lu Guang (盧廣) served as the sheriff of Henan County (河南), one of the two counties making up the Tang eastern capital Luoyang.

Lu Shang lost his father early in life and was said to be poor, but studious. He passed the imperial examinations in the Jinshi class in 809, during the reign of Emperor Dezong's grandson Emperor Xianzong, and further passed a special examination for those who made good rulings. He was initially made Xiaoshu Lang (校書郎), a copyeditor at the archival ministry. When the official Fang Chuanshi (范傳式) served as the governor of Xuanshe Circuit (宣歙, headquartered in modern Xuancheng, Anhui), Lu served as his assistant. Lu later served as a secretary under successive military governors (jiedushi) of Xichuan Circuit (西川, headquartered in modern Chengdu, Sichuan), the former chancellors Wang Bo and Duan Wenchang. Lu was later recalled to the capital Chang'an to serve as Gongbu Yuanwailang (工部員外郎), a low-level official at the ministry of public works (工部, Gongbu), and then as the magistrate of Henan County. He later served three terms as supervisory officials at the ministries—Gongbu Langzhong (工部郎中), at the ministry of public works; Duzhi Langzhong (度支郎中), at the ministry of census (戶部, Hubu); and Sifeng Langzhong (司封郎中), at the minister of civil service affairs (吏部, Libu).

== During Emperor Wenzong's and Emperor Wuzong's reigns ==
In 835, during the reign of Emperor Xianzhong's grandson Emperor Wenzong, Lu was made the deputy mayor of Jingzhao Municipality (京兆, i.e., the Chang'an region) and acting chief judge (大理卿, Dali Qing) of the supreme court (大理寺, Dali Si). Early in Emperor Wenzong's Kaicheng era (836–840), he was sent out of the capital to serve as the prefect of Su Prefecture (蘇州, in modern Suzhou, Jiangsu). Su Prefecture was a salt-producing prefecture, but at that time, the regulations on the sale of salt were complex, and the administrators were using this opportunity to embezzle profits from the fishermen who produced salt. When Lu reached Su Prefecture, he met with the fishermen personally and simplified the regulations, allowing them to sell as much salt as they could properly produce, rather than set quotas, and this benefited the people greatly. It was said that, as a result, the taxation the government received from the salt monopoly at Su Prefecture was doubled. Li Shi the chancellor in charge of the monopoly at the time was impressed, and he had Lu made the governor (觀察使, Guanchashi) of Zhexi Circuit (浙西, headquartered in modern Zhenjiang, Jiangsu), as well as the prefect of its capital Run Prefecture (潤州) in 837. Later, Lu was recalled to be the deputy minister of justice (刑部侍郎, Xingbu Shilang), and then the mayor of Jingzhao.

In 843, when Emperor Wenzong's brother and successor Emperor Wuzong was conducting a campaign against the warlord Liu Zhen, Lu served as the deputy minister of census (戶部侍郎) and acting director of finances, and also was in charge of supplying the troops. It was said that as a result of his work, the army did not lack supplies. After Liu was defeated, Lu was made the military governor of Dongchuan Circuit (東川, headquartered in modern Mianyang, Sichuan, as well as the prefect of its capital Zi Prefecture (梓州).

== During Emperor Xuānzong's reign ==
In 846, after the death of Emperor Wuzong and succession by his uncle Emperor Xuānzong, Lu was recalled to Chang'an to serve as the deputy minister of defense (兵部侍郎, Bingbu Shilang). He also again served as acting director of finances. Later that year, he was made Zhongshu Shilang (中書侍郎), the deputy head of the legislative bureau of government (中書省, Zhongshu Sheng) and chancellor de facto with the designation Tong Zhongshu Menxia Pingzhangshi (同中書門下平章事). He was also created the Duke of Fanyang.

Lu did not serve long as chancellor, however. In 847, during the middle of a drought, which were often viewed as signs of divine displeasure over overly severe punishment, Emperor Xuānzong had Lu and the deputy chief imperial censor Feng Ao (封敖) review the cases of the prisoners held at Chang'an. Lu and Feng apparently advocated for commutation of many death sentences, but then-chief judge of the supreme court, Ma Zhi, objected, and submitted a petition to Emperor Xuānzong arguing that that leniency would have the opposite effect of drawing further divine displeasure. Due to the machinations of Lu's fellow chancellor Bai Minzhong, Emperor Xuānzong approved Ma's petition, and soon thereafter, Lu was removed from his chancellor position and made the military governor of Wuchang Circuit (武昌, headquartered in modern Wuhan, Hubei).

In 859, Lu was suffering from an illness, and he submitted a petition requesting a replacement. Emperor Xuānzong recalled him to Chang'an to serve as minister of census (戶部尚書, Hubu Shangshu). Later that year, though, before Lu could reach Chang'an, he died at Hanyin (漢陰, in modern Ankang, Shaanxi).

== Notes and references ==
- Old Book of Tang, vol. 176.
- New Book of Tang, vol. 182.
- Zizhi Tongjian, vol. 248.
