= Jiang Shen =

Jiang Shen (蔣伸) (799–881), courtesy name Dazhi (大直), formally the Duke of Le'an (樂安公), was an official of the Chinese Tang dynasty, serving as a chancellor during the reigns of Emperor Xuānzong and Emperor Yizong.

== Background ==
Jiang Shen was perhaps born in 799, during the reign of Emperor Dezong. His family was originally from Yixing (義興, in modern Wuxi, Jiangsu), but had moved to the eastern capital Luoyang at least by the time that his father Jiang Ai (蔣乂) was serving in governmental service. Jiang Ai's grandfather Jiang Gui (蔣瓌) and father Jiang Jiangming (蔣將明), as well as Jiang Ai, all served in the Tang imperial government as governmental scholars, with Jiang Ai reach prominence as a historian, authoring works on the lives of chancellors, as well as a number of contributors to the reign of the great early Tang emperor Emperor Taizong, and being created the Duke of Yixing. Jiang Shen was the second of Jiang Ai's five known sons, with at least one older brother, Jiang Xi (蔣係), who also reached great prominence and was created the Duke of Huaiyang. Jiang Shen had at least three younger brothers who also served in the government, Jiang Jie (蔣偕), Jiang Xian (蔣仙), and Jiang Ji (蔣佶). Jiang Shen himself passed the imperial examinations in the Jinshi class, and thereafter served on the staffs of various regional governors.

== During Emperor Xuānzong's reign ==
In 848, by which time Emperor Dezong's great-grandson Emperor Xuānzong was emperor, Jiang Shen was recalled to the capital Chang'an to serve as You Bujue (右補闕), a low-level advisory official at the legislative bureau of government (中書省, Zhongshu Sheng), as well as an editor of imperial history. (It was said that while both Jiang Shen and his nephew Jiang Zhao (蔣兆, Jiang Xi's son) were talented writers, they were not considered exceptional in their style, but were considered good historians.) He later served as Jiabu Langzhong (駕部郎中), a supervisory official at the ministry of rites (禮部, Libu) and was put in charge of drafting edicts. In 851, when the chancellor Bai Minzhong was put in charge of overseeing the campaign against Danxiang rebellions, Bai was allowed to retain a number of imperial officials to serve on his staff, and he chose Jiang to serve as his deputy in his role as the military governor (Jiedushi) of Binning Circuit (邠寧, headquartered in modern Xianyang, Shaanxi). Jiang later returned to Chang'an and was made acting deputy minister of census (戶部侍郎, Hubu Shilang). In 855, he was made an imperial scholar (翰林學士, Hanlin Xueshi), and was later made the chief imperial scholar (承旨, Chengzhi). In 856, he was made the deputy minister of defense (兵部侍郎, Bingbu Shilang) and the director of taxation.

It was said that Emperor Xuānzong respected Jiang's opinion. On one occasion in 858, when he was meeting Jiang privately (as the officials who were one level below chancellors, known as the "Second Tier Officials" (次對官, Cidui Guan) were allowed to do), Jiang made the comment to Emperor Xuānzong, "These days, it is easy to gain official positions, and people take dangerous risks." Emperor Xuānzong, in surprise, responded, "If this goes on, disturbances will occur." Jiang responded, "Not yet, but if too many people take dangerous risks, it is not difficult for disturbances to occur." As Jiang was about to leave, Emperor Xuānzong kept him three times, stating, "Soon I will not be able to meet with you again privately." Jiang did not understand Emperor's implications, but it soon became clear, as Emperor Xuānzong gave him the designation Tong Zhongshu Menxia Pingzhangshi (同中書門下平章事), making him a chancellor de facto. (After he was named chancellor, he would have to meet with Emperor Xuānzong along with other chancellors and could no longer meet with Emperor Xuānzong alone.) Four months later, he was relieved of his director of taxation responsibilities, and given the additional title of Zhongshu Shilang (中書侍郎, deputy head of the legislative bureau).

== During Emperors Yizong's and Xizong's reigns ==
Emperor Xuānzong died in 859 and was succeeded by his son Emperor Yizong. Jiang Shen remained chancellor and was also made the minister of justice (刑部尚書, Xingbu Shangshu) and put charge of overseeing the editing of the imperial history. In 862, he was removed from his chancellor position and made the military governor of Hezhong Circuit (河中, headquartered in modern Yuncheng, Shanxi), continuing to carry the Tong Zhongshu Menxia Pingzhangshi title as an honorary title. He was later transferred to Xuanwu Circuit (宣武, headquartered in modern Kaifeng, Henan); the order transferring him also referred to him as the Duke of Le'an, indicating that he had been created that title sometime prior. Soon thereafter, though, he was made an advisor to the Crown Prince, with his office at Luoyang. In 866, he was made the prefect of Hua Prefecture (華州, in modern Weinan, Shaanxi). He was later again made an advisor to the crown prince, when he retired on account of age. He probably died in 881, during the reign of Emperor Yizong's son Emperor Xizong.

== Notes and references ==
- Old Book of Tang, vol. 149.
- New Book of Tang, vol. 132.
- Zizhi Tongjian, vols. 249, 250.
