= Cui Guicong =

Cui Guicong (崔龜從), courtesy name Xuangao (玄告), was an official of the Chinese Tang dynasty, who served as a chancellor during the reign of Emperor Xuānzong.

== Background and early career ==
It is not known when Cui Guicong was born. He was from the "Greater Branch" of the prominent Cui clan of Qinghe (清河, in modern Xingtai, Hebei), and his male-line ancestors originally claimed ancestry from the ruling house of the Spring and Autumn period state Qi. Cui Guicong's traceable ancestry included officials of the Han dynasty (including Cui Yan), Liu Song, Northern Wei, Northern Qi, Sui dynasty, and the Tang dynasties, although neither Cui Guicong's grandfather Cui Cheng (崔誠) nor his father Cui Huang (崔黃) were listed with any offices.

Cui Guicong passed the imperial examinations in the Jinshi class in 817, during the reign of Emperor Xianzong, and he subsequently passed two additional special imperial examinations in the classes of those who were considered good and capable of strategies, and those who made good rulings. He thereafter served as You Shiyi (右拾遺), a low-level advisory official at the legislative bureau of government (中書省, Zhongshu Sheng). In 828, during the reign of Emperor Xianzong's grandson Emperor Wenzong, he was made Taichang Boshi (太常博士), a scholar at the ministry of worship (太常寺, Taichang Si).

While serving as Taichang Boshi, Cui was considered an expert in proper etiquette in imperial ceremonies. As Emperor Wenzong had succeeded his older brother Emperor Jingzong after Emperor Jingzong's death, his mourning text for Emperor Jingzong originally referred to himself as, "your filially pious younger brother." Cui pointed out that because Emperor Wenzong was of the same generation as Emperor Jingzong, "filially pious" was inappropriate, and suggested that, instead, he referred to himself by name to show respect instead. Also at Cui's suggestion, the sacrifices made to the gods of nine regions of heaven were downgraded to below those offered to the gods of the five planets (Mercury, Venus, Mars, Jupiter, and Saturn), as he pointed out that traditionally, the gods of the nine regions were considered lower in status to the gods of the five planets. Further, it was at his suggestions that the custom that the emperor wait several days before mourning important officials be abolished—pointing out that Emperor Wenzong's distinguished ancestor Emperor Taizong had insisted on mourning those officials immediately.

Cui was later made Kaogong Langzhong (考功郎中), a supervisory official at the ministry of civil service affairs (吏部, Libu), as well as an editor of the imperial histories. In 835, he was made Sixun Langzhong (司勛郎中), still a supervisory official at the ministry of civil service affairs and was also put in charge of drafting imperial edicts. Later in the year, he was made Zhongshu Sheren (中書舍人), a mid-level official at the legislative bureau.

Early in Emperor Wenzong's Kaicheng era (836–840), Cui was sent out of the capital Chang'an to serve as the prefect of Hua Prefecture (華州, in modern Weinan, Shaanxi). In 838, he was recalled to Chang'an to serve as the deputy minister of census (戶部侍郎, Hubu Shilang) and put in charge of tax collection. In 839, he was briefly made acting minister of civil service affairs (吏部尚書, Hubu Shangshu), to select officials for that year.

== Chancellorship and aftermaths ==
In 850, by which time Emperor Wenzong's uncle Emperor Xuānzong was emperor, Cui Guicong, who was then the minister of census (戶部尚書, Hubu Shangshu) and the director of finances, was made a chancellor de facto with the designation Tong Zhongshu Menxia Pingzhangshi (同中書門下平章事). In 851, he submitted to Emperor Xuānzong a 30-volume calendar for Tang. In 852, he was removed from his chancellor position and made the military governor (jiedushi) of Xuanwu Circuit (宣武, headquartered in modern Kaifeng, Henan). He served as military governor at other circuits before his death, although his terms of service and time of death were not given in his biographies.

== Notes and references ==
- Old Book of Tang, vol. 176.
- New Book of Tang, vol. 160.
- Zizhi Tongjian, vol. 249.
