= Xiao Ye =

Xiao Ye (蕭鄴), courtesy name Qizhi (啟之), was an official of the Chinese Tang dynasty, who served as a chancellor during the reigns of Emperor Xuānzong and (briefly) Emperor Xuānzong's son Emperor Yizong.

== Background and early career ==
It is not known when Xiao Ye was born. His ancestry came from the imperial house of the Liang dynasty—which in turn traced its ancestry to the great Han dynasty prime minister Xiao He, whose ancestry was purportedly from the ruling house of the Spring and Autumn period and Warring States period state Song (and thus from the imperial house of Shang dynasty, as well as a line of officials of Han, the Jin dynasty, Liu Song, and Southern Qi (whose imperial house was distantly related to the Liang imperial house). Xiao Ye's eighth-generation ancestor was the brief-reigning Liang emperor Xiao Yuanming, a son of Xiao Yi (蕭懿), an older brother to Liang's founder Emperor Wu of Liang. For several generations prior to him, Xiao Ye's male-line ancestors served as officials of Tang dynasty, including Xiao Ye's grandfather Xiao Zhi (蕭直), who served as an imperial attendant, and his father Xiao Ge (蕭革), who served as a prefectural prefect. Xiao Ye had at least one older brother, Xiao Jie (蕭嶰), and one younger brother, Xiao Xian (蕭峴).

It is known that Xiao Ye passed the imperial examinations in the Jinshi class, but it is not known when that occurred. He successively served as an imperial censor with the title Jiancha Yushi (監察御史); an imperial scholar (翰林學士, Hanlin Xueshi); and the prefect of Heng Prefecture (near modern Hengyang, Hunan).

== During Emperor Xuānzong's reign ==
In the middle of the Dazhong era (847–860) of Emperor Xuānzong, Xiao Ye was recalled to the capital Chang'an to again serve as imperial scholar; he then successively served as Zhongshu Sheren (中書舍人), a mid-level official at the legislative bureau of government (中書省, Zhongshu Sheng); and then the deputy minister of census (戶部侍郎, Hubu Shilang), serving also as the director of taxation. As of 856, Xiao Ye was serving as the deputy minister of defense (兵部侍郎, Bingbu Shilang) as well as the director of finances, when Emperor Xuānzong was set to make him chancellor, even readying the imperial scholars to draft an edict to that effect. However, after he delivered that direction to the imperial scholars, the eunuchs who delivered the order, Wang Guichang (王歸長) and Ma Gongru (馬公儒), asked him whether Xiao should remain as director of taxation as well—causing Emperor Xuānzong to suspect Wang and Ma of associating with Xiao. Emperor Xuānzong therefore commissioned Cui Shenyou as chancellor instead. This merely delayed Xiao's commission, however, as in 857, Xiao was nevertheless made chancellor as well, with the designation Tong Zhongshu Menxia Pingzhangshi (同中書門下平章事), and also remained the director of finances briefly, although he was relieved of that responsibility late in 857. He would remain chancellor for the rest of Emperor Xuānzong's reign.

== After Emperor Xuānzong's reign ==
Emperor Xuānzong died in 859 and was succeeded by his son Emperor Yizong. Late that year, Xiao Ye was removed from his chancellor position and made the military governor (jiedushi) of Jingnan Circuit (荊南, headquartered in modern Jingzhou, Hubei), continuing to carry the Tong Zhongshu Menxia Pingzhangshi title as an honorary title. He was later transferred to Xichuan Circuit (西川, headquartered in modern Chengdu, Sichuan), but was said to be powerless in stopping Nanzhao incursions. In 864, he was transferred to Shannan West Circuit (山南西道, headquartered in modern Hanzhong, Shaanxi). He later served as the military governor of Hedong Circuit (河東, headquartered in modern Taiyuan, Shanxi), and was said to be undistinguished in his service there, before dying. His death year is not known, probably 874, before the next military governor took office.

== Notes and references ==
- New Book of Tang, vol. 182.
- Zizhi Tongjian, vols. 249, 250.
