= Zheng Su =

Tang Chinese official

Zheng Su (Chinese: 鄭肅), courtesy name Aijing (乂敬), was an official of the Chinese Tang dynasty, serving as a chancellor during the reigns of Emperor Wuzong and Emperor Xuānzong.

== Background and early career ==
It is not known when Zheng Su is born, and little is known about his ancestry (as his family tree was not listed in the table of the chancellors' family trees in the New Book of Tang with the other chancellors named Zheng) other than that his family was originally from Yingyang (滎陽, in modern Zhengzhou, Henan), and that both his grandfather Zheng Lie (鄭烈) and father Zheng Yue (鄭閱) were Confucian scholars. In 808, Zheng Su passed the imperial examinations in the Jinshi class, and further passed a special imperial examination for those good at making rulings. He subsequently served on the staffs of regional governors.

== During Emperor Wenzong's reign ==
Early in Emperor Wenzong's Taihe era (827–835), Zheng Su was recalled to the capital Chang'an to serve as a supervisory official at one of the ministries under the executive bureau (尚書省, Shangshu Sheng). In 832, he was made the deputy minister of worship (太常少卿, Taichang Shaoqing). As Zheng was capable in reading ancient texts and knowledgeable about the Confucian classics, it was said that whenever there were disputes among the scholars at the ministry of worship about the meanings of the Zuo Zhuan or the three texts about rites (i.e., the Rites of Zhou, the Etiquette and Rituals, and the Classic of Rites), Zheng was the one who would settle the disputes.

At that time, Emperor Wenzong favored his oldest son Li Yong the Prince of Lu and wanted famed Confucian scholars to serve on his staff, so he selected Yu Jingxiu (庾敬休) to serve as Li Yong's teacher, Li Jianfang (李踐方) to serve as Li Yong's military advisor, and Zheng to serve as Li Yong's secretary general, with all three continuing to hold their other posts as well; it was from this point that Zheng began to become well-known. After Li Yong was subsequently created crown prince, Zheng was given an additional title as imperial attendant (給事中, Jishizhong). In 834, he, along with his colleague Han Ci (韓佽), made an unsuccessful attempt to stop the promotions Emperor Wenzong was bestowing on the emperor's close associate Li Zhongyan (on account of Li Zhongyan's past crimes). In 835, he was made the deputy minister of justice (刑部侍郎, Xingbu Shilang), and was soon made Shangshu You Cheng (尚書右丞), one of the secretaries general at the executive bureau; he was also put in charge of selecting officials at the ministry of civil service affairs (吏部, Libu).

Early in Emperor Wenzong's Kaicheng era (836–840), Zheng was sent out of Chang'an to serve as the governor (觀察使, Guanchashi) of Shanguo Circuit (陝虢, headquartered in modern Sanmenxia, Henan). In 837, he was recalled to Chang'an to serve as the deputy minister of civil service affairs (吏部侍郎, Libu Shilang). As Emperor Wenzong knew that Zheng had previously served under Li Yong and was righteous in his behavior and words, he also made Zheng an advisor to Li Yong and had him teach Li Yong the Confucian classics. Subsequently, when Li Yong began to lose Emperor Wenzong's favor due to accusations made against him by Emperor Wenzong's favorite concubine Consort Yang, Emperor Wenzong considered deposing Li Yong. Zheng tried to intercede on Li Yong's behalf by discussing with Emperor Wenzong the Confucian principles on lord-subject and father-son relationships, and Emperor Wenzong thanked him. However, after Li Yong was nearly deposed in 838 and died later that year, Zheng was sent out of Chang'an to serve as the military governor (jiedushi) of Hezhong Circuit (河中, headquartered in modern Yuncheng, Shanxi) as well as the mayor of its capital Hezhong Municipality.

== During Emperor Wuzong's reign ==
After Emperor Wenzong died in 840 and was succeeded by his brother Emperor Wuzong, it was said that Emperor Wuzong knew that Li Yong had been falsely accused and therefore executed a number of people involved in falsely accusing Li Yong. Meanwhile, the officials at court praised Zheng Su for his faithfulness, so Emperor Wuzong recalled Zheng to serve as the minister of worship (太常卿, Taichang Qing). He subsequently served as the military governor of Shannan East Circuit (山南東道, headquartered in modern Xiangfan, Hubei). In 845, he was recalled to serve as acting You Pushe (右僕射), one of the heads of the executive bureau, and chancellor de facto with the designation Tong Zhongshu Menxia Pingzhangshi (同中書門下平章事). He was also put in charge of editing the imperial history.

== During Emperor Xuānzong's reign ==
After Emperor Wuzong died in 846 and was succeeded by his uncle Emperor Xuānzong, Emperor Xuānzong, despising the lead chancellor Li Deyu for his hold on power, removed Li Deyu from his chancellor post and sent him out of Chang'an. As Zheng had a strong friendship with Li Deyu, Zheng was also removed. He was sent to Jingnan Circuit (荊南, headquartered in modern Jingzhou, Hubei) to serve as its military governor, continuing to carry the Tong Zhongshu Menxia Pingzhangshi title as an honorary title. When he died, he was given posthumous honors, including the posthumous name Wenjian (文簡, "civil and approachable"); his year of death was not recorded in history.

== Notes and references ==
- Old Book of Tang, vol. 176.
- New Book of Tang, vol. 182.
- Zizhi Tongjian, vols. 245, 248.
