= Wei Fu =

Chinese Tang dynasty chancellor (d. 850 CE)

Wei Fu (Chinese: 魏扶; died July 14, 850), courtesy name Xiangzhi (相之), was an official of the Chinese Tang dynasty, serving as a chancellor during the reign of Emperor Xuānzong.

Very little is known about Wei's background despite his high status, as there was no biography for him in the official histories of Tang, the Old Book of Tang and the New Book of Tang. According to the table of the chancellors' family trees in the New Book of Tang, his grandfather was named Wei Ying (魏盈) and his father Wei Chang (魏昌), and neither was listed with any official titles. According to the brief introduction for him in the Complete Tang Poems, which collected three poems by him, he passed the imperial examinations in the Jinshi class in 830, during the reign of Emperor Wenzong.

As of 849, during Emperor Xuānzong's reign, Wei was serving as the deputy minister of defense (兵部侍郎, Bingbu Shilang) and the director of taxation, when he was made a chancellor de facto with the designation Tong Zhongshu Menxia Pingzhangzhi (同中書門下平章事). He died in 850, while still serving as chancellor.

== Notes and references ==
- Zizhi Tongjian, vols. 248, 249.
