= Cui Yuanshi =

Cui Yuanshi (崔元式) (died 848?) was an official of the Chinese Tang dynasty, serving briefly as chancellor during the reign of Emperor Xuānzong.

== Background ==
It is not known when Cui Yuanshi was born. He was from "The elder house of Boling" of the prominent Cui clan of Boling (博陵, in modern Hengshui, Hebei), which claimed ancestry from the ruling Jiang house of the Spring and Autumn period state Qi. Cui Xuan's traceable ancestors included officials of the Qin dynasty, Han dynasty, Jin dynasty (266–420), Northern Wei, and the Tang dynasty. His father Cui Jing (崔儆) served as a secretary general of the executive bureau of government (尚書省, Shangshu Sheng). His older brother Cui Yuanlüe (崔元略) was a prominent official during the reigns of Emperor Xianzong, Emperor Xianzong's son Emperor Muzong, and Emperor Muzong's sons Emperor Jingzong and Emperor Wenzong. Cui Yuanlüe was considered a potential chancellor at times but was never chancellor. Cui Yuanlüe's son Cui Xuan, however, served as a chancellor before Cui Yuanshi did, and would again after Cui Yuanshi. Other than Cui Yuanlüe, Cui Yuanshi also had at least one older brother, Cui Yuanshou (崔元受), and one younger brother, Cui Yuanru (崔元儒); all of these Cui brothers known in history, including Cui Yuanshi passed the imperial examinations in the Jinshi class.

Cui Yuanshi himself served on the staffs of regional governors early in his career. He was eventually himself made the governor (觀察使, Guanchashi) of Hunan Circuit (湖南, headquartered in modern Changsha, Hunan).

== During Emperor Wuzong's reign ==
In 843, during the reign of Emperor Wuzong, Cui Yuanshi was made the military governor of Hezhong Circuit (河中, headquartered in modern Yuncheng, Shanxi), as well as the mayor of its capital Hezhong Municipality. In 844, he was made the military governor of Hedong Circuit (河東, headquartered in modern Taiyuan, Shanxi), as well as the mayor of its capital Taiyuan Municipality. In 846, he was recalled to the capital Chang'an to serve as the minister of justice (刑部尚書, Xingbu Shangshu).

== During Emperor Xuānzong's reign ==
Emperor Wuzong died in 846 and was succeeded by his uncle Emperor Xuānzong. Thereafter, in 847, Cui Yuanshi was made the director of finances, and then further made Menxia Shilang (門下侍郎), the deputy head of the examination bureau of government (門下省, Menxia Sheng), as well as chancellor de facto with the designation Tong Zhongshu Menxia Pingzhangshi (同中書門下平章事). In 848, Cui was removed from his chancellor position and made the minister of census (戶部尚書, Hubu Shangshu), due to illness. He died thereafter, and was given posthumous honors and the posthumous name of Zhuang (莊, "prevailing").

== Notes and references ==
- Old Book of Tang, vol. 163.
- New Book of Tang, vol. 160.
- Zizhi Tongjian, vols. 247, 248.
