= Cui Xuan =

Cui Xuan (崔鉉), courtesy name Taishuo (臺碩), formally the Duke of Wei (魏公), was an official of the Chinese Tang dynasty, serving two terms as a chancellor during the reigns of Emperor Wuzong and Emperor Wuzong's uncle Emperor Xuānzong.

== Background ==
It is not known when Cui Xuan was born. He was from the "Elder Boling branch" of the prominent Cui clan of Boling (博陵, in modern Hengshui, Hebei), which claimed ancestry from the ruling Jiang house of the Spring and Autumn period state Qi. Cui Xuan's traceable ancestors included officials of Qin dynasty, Han dynasty, Jin dynasty (266–420), Northern Wei, and Tang dynasty. His grandfather Cui Jing (崔儆) served as a secretary general of the executive bureau of government (尚書省, Shangshu Sheng). His father Cui Yuanlüe (崔元略) was a prominent official during the reigns of Emperor Xianzong, Emperor Xianzong's son Emperor Muzong, and Emperor Muzong's sons Emperor Jingzong and Emperor Wenzong. Cui Yuanlüe was considered a potential chancellor at times but was never chancellor. Cui Yuanlüe's younger brother Cui Yuanshi served briefly as chancellor between the two terms that Cui Xuan would eventually serve as chancellor. Cui Xuan had at least one younger brother, Cui Zi (崔鎡).

Cui Xuan himself passed the imperial examinations in the Jinshi class, and thereafter served three terms on the staffs of regional governors, including, at one point, under the former chancellor Li Shi, the military governor (jiedushi) of Jingnan Circuit (荊南, headquartered in modern Jingzhou, Hubei).

== During Emperor Wuzong's reign ==
Early in the Huichang era (841–846) of Emperor Wenzong's brother and successor Emperor Wuzong, Cui Xuan was recalled to the capital Chang'an to serve as Zuo Shiyi (左拾遺), a low-level advisory official at the examination bureau of government (門下省, Menxia Sheng). He was later made Sixun Yuanwailang (司勛員外郎), a low-level official at the ministry of civil service affairs (吏部, Libu) as well as imperial scholar (翰林學士, Hanlin Xueshi). He was subsequently promoted to Zhongshu Sheren (中書舍人), a mid-level official at the legislative bureau (中書省, Zhongshu Sheng), as well as chief imperial scholar (翰林學士承旨, Hanlin Xueshi Chengzhi). Emperor Wuzong favored polo and wrestling, and when Cui advised him against devotion to games, Emperor Wuzong agreed. In 843, he thus made Cui Zhongshu Shilang (中書侍郎), the deputy head of the legislative bureau, as well as chancellor de facto with the designation Tong Zhongshu Menxia Pingzhangshi (同中書門下平章事). It was said that, contrary to the previous years, when emperors felt compelled to discuss the commissions of chancellors with powerful eunuchs, Cui's commission was made suddenly, with Emperor Wuzong only having informed the imperial scholar Wei Cong (韋悰) to have Wei draft the edict, without the prior knowledge by the other chancellors or the eunuch directors of palace communications (Shumishi) Liu Xingshen (劉行深) or Yang Qinyi (楊欽義).

However, it was said that the lead chancellor Li Deyu was jealous of Cui. In 845, he was thus removed from chancellor post and made the minister of census (戶部尚書, Hubu Shangshu). He was subsequently sent out of Chang'an to serve as the governor (觀察使, Guanchashi) of Shanguo Circuit (陝虢, headquartered in modern Sanmenxia, Henan).

== During Emperor Xuānzong's reign ==
Emperor Wuzong died in 846 and was succeeded by his uncle Emperor Xuānzong. Cui Xuan was then made the military governor of Hezhong Circuit (河中, headquartered in modern Yuncheng, Shanxi) as well as the mayor of its capital Hezhong Municipality; he was also created the Viscount of Boling. He was thereafter recalled to Chang'an to serve as chief imperial censor (御史大夫, Yushi Daifu). In 849, Emperor Xuānzong again made him chancellor with the designation Tong Zhongshu Menxia Pingzhangshi as well as Zhongshu Shilang. He eventually came to carry the titles of Zuo Pushe (左僕射, one of the heads of the executive bureau (尚書省, Shangshu Sheng)), Menxia Shilang (門下侍郎, deputy head of the examination bureau), administrator of Daqing Palace (大清宮), chief scholar at Hongwen Pavilian (弘文館), and the Duke of Boling.

In 851, with Emperor Xuānzong tired of dealing with repeated Dangxiang rebellions, Cui suggested that a paramount official be appointed to oversee the Dangxiang affairs. Emperor Xuānzong thus made Cui's colleague Bai Minzhong the supreme commander of the forces facing the Dangxiang.

In 852, with agrarian rebels occupying Mount Ji (雞山, in modern Nanchong, Sichuan), Emperor Xuānzong dispatched the general Wang Zhihong (王贄弘) to the region to deal with them. Cui suggested that instead an imperial official be sent to persuade them to submit, so Emperor Xuānzong sent the official Liu Tong (劉潼), who was able to persuade the Mount Ji rebels to surrender. (However, after Liu accepted their surrender, Wang and the eunuch monitor Sixian Yiyi (似先義逸) slaughtered the surrendered rebels anyway.)

In 855, with Huainan Circuit (淮南, headquartered in modern Yangzhou, Jiangsu) suffering from a famine, but the military governor Du Cong not governing the circuit diligently, Emperor Xuānzong removed Du from the post and sent Cui out to Huainan to serve as its military governor, continuing to carry the Tong Zhongshu Menxia Pingzhangshi title as an honorary title. He was also created the greater title of Duke of Wei. As he departed for Huainan, Emperor Xuānzong held a great feast to send him off and personally wrote a poem to him.

In 858, when the Xuanshe Circuit (宣歙, headquartered in modern Xuancheng, Anhui) officer Kang Quantai (康全泰) mutinied and expelled the governor Zheng Xun (鄭薰), who fled to Huainan's capital Yang Prefecture (揚州), Cui launched his troops to attack the Xuanshe rebels, so Emperor Xuānzong gave him the additional title of governor of Xuanshe. Later in the year, he captured Xuanshe's capital Xuan Prefecture (宣州), killing Kang and his coconspirators. He then resigned the additional post of governor of Xuanshe, which was then given to Wen Zhang (溫璋).

== During Emperor Yizong's reign ==
Early in the Xiantong era (860–874) of Emperor Xuānzong's son and successor Emperor Yizong, Cui Xuan was transferred to Shannan East Circuit (山南東道, headquartered in modern Xiangfang, Hubei), and later to Jingnan Circuit. In 868, with soldiers originally from Xusi Circuit (徐泗, headquartered modern Xuzhou, Jiangsu) having launched a mutiny under the leadership of Pang Xun at their defensive post at Gui Prefecture (桂州, in modern Guilin, Guangxi) as they wanted to return home to Xusi, Cui launched his troops and prepared for a confrontation with them; as a result, the Xusi mutineers did not dare to enter Jingnan, and instead crossed into Jiangxi Circuit (江西, headquartered in modern Nanchang, Jiangxi) and Huainan to head for Xusi. It was said that the imperial government much approved of Cui's preparedness. Cui eventually died at his post at Jingnan, but the year is not known. His son Cui Hang would serve as a chancellor during the reign of Emperor Yizong's son Emperor Xizong.

== Notes and references ==
- Old Book of Tang, vol. 163.
- New Book of Tang, vol. 160.
- Zizhi Tongjian, vols. 247, 248, 249, 251.
