= Xiahou Zi =

Xiahou Zi (Chinese: 夏侯孜), courtesy name Haoxue (好學), formally the Duke of Qiao Commandery (譙郡公), was an official of the Chinese Tang dynasty, serving two terms as a chancellor during the reigns of Emperor Xuānzong and Emperor Xuānzong's son Emperor Yizong.

== Background and early career ==
It is not known when Xiahou Zi was born. His family was from Qiao (譙, in modern Bozhou, Anhui) and claimed ancestry from the Spring and Autumn period state Qi, but little is known about his traceable ancestry except for his father Xiahou Shen (夏侯審), who served as a supervisory official at the ministry of rites. Xiahou Zi had at least two older brothers, Xiahou Min (夏侯敏) and Xiahou Jing (夏侯敬), and at least two younger brothers, Xiahou Fei (夏侯斐) and Xiahou Ao (夏侯敖).

Xiahou Zi passed the imperial examinations in the Jinshi class in 826, during the reign of Emperor Jingzong. He subsequently served on staffs of various regional governors, before later successively serving as the prefect of Wu Prefecture (婺州, in modern Jinhua, Zhejiang) and the prefect of Jiang Prefecture (絳州, in modern Yuncheng, Shanxi). He was later recalled to the capital Chang'an to serve as an advisory official with the title Jianyi Daifu (諫議大夫), and later as an imperial attendant (給事中, Jishizhong). In 856, by which time Emperor Jingzong's uncle Emperor Xuānzong was emperor, Xiahou was made the deputy minister of justice (刑部侍郎, Xingbu Shilang). In 857, he made Shangshu You Cheng (尚書右丞), one of the secretaries general of the executive bureau of government (尚書省, Shangshu Sheng), and given the honorific title of Shang Zhuguo (上柱國). Soon thereafter, he was also made the deputy minister of census (戶部侍郎, Hubu Shilang) and the director of taxation — after Emperor Xuānzong had initially offered the position to the mayor of Jingzhao Municipality (京兆, i.e., the Chang'an region), Wei Ao (韋澳) but Wei declined.

== First chancellorship ==
In 858, by which time Xiahou Zi was referred to as the deputy minister of defense (兵部侍郎, Bingbu Shilang) and the director of the salt and iron monopolies, Emperor Xuānzong gave Xiahou the designation Tong Zhongshu Menxia Pingzhangshi (同中書門下平章事), making him a chancellor de facto. After Emperor Xuānzong died in 859 and was succeeded by his son Emperor Yizong, Emperor Yizong continued to have Xiahou serve as chancellor, and made him Menxia Shilang (門下侍郎), the deputy head of the examination bureau of government (門下省, Menxia Sheng); he also created Xiahou the Marquess of Qiao. In 860, when agrarian rebel Qiu Fu (裘甫) overran Zhedong Circuit (浙東, headquartered in modern Shaoxing, Zhejiang), it was at Xiahou's recommendation that Emperor Yizong commissioned the general Wang Shi to suppress Qiu's rebellion, and it was said that it was with Xiahou's full support that Wang was fully supplied and was able to defeat Qiu. In late 860, after the end of the Qiu rebellion, Xiahou was made the military governor (Jiedushi) of Xichuan Circuit (西川, headquartered in modern Chengdu, Sichuan), continuing to keep the Tong Zhongshu Menxia Pingzhangshi title as an honorary title.

== Second chancellorship ==
In 862, by which time Xiahou Zi was referred to as the former military governor of Xichuan, he was made Zuo Pushe (左僕射), one of the heads of the executive bureau, and chancellor again, with the designation Tong Zhongshu Menxia Pingzhangshi. It was at Xiahou's recommendation that, in 864, the general Gao Pian was commissioned to recapture Annan (安南, in modern Hanoi, Vietnam) from Dali forces. Late in 864, Xiahou was again removed from his chancellor position and made the military governor of Hezhong Circuit (河中, headquartered in modern Yuncheng).

== After second chancellorship ==
In 868, when Xiahou Zi was apparently still governing Hezhong, and by which time he was referred to by the title of Duke of Qiao Commandery, Dali forces made a major incursion into Xichuan Circuit. Emperor Yizong, blaming Xiahou for not having fortified Xichuan's defenses while governing Xichuan, issued an edict rebuking Xiahou and relieving Xiahou from his post as military governor of Hezhong. Xiahou was made an advisor to the Crown Prince, with his office at the eastern capital Luoyang. It was said that Xiahou died soon thereafter, but the date is not known.

== Notes and references ==
- Old Book of Tang, vol. 177.
- New Book of Tang, vol. 182.
- Zizhi Tongjian, vols. 249, 250.
