= Wei Cong =

Official of the Tang dynasty in China

Wei Cong (韋琮), courtesy name Liyu (禮玉), was an official of the Chinese Tang dynasty, serving briefly as a chancellor during the reign of Emperor Xuānzong (reigned 846 – 859).

== Background and early career ==
It is not known when Wei Cong was born, and little is known about his background — as there was no biography of his in the Old Book of Tang, and his biography in the New Book of Tang merely stated that he came from a line of prominent officials, while omitting his ancestry entirely in its table of the chancellors' family trees, not listing him among the other chancellors of the Wei clan.

According to the New Book of Tang, Wei Cong passed the imperial examinations in the Jinshi class, and eventually served as an imperial censor with the title Dianzhong Shiyushi (殿中侍御史). While serving in that post, he was considered to have made incorrect conclusions in criminal investigations, and was instead made Taichang Boshi (太常博士), a scholar at the ministry of worship (太常寺, Taichang Si). After several promotions, he was eventually made the deputy minister of census (戶部侍郎, Hubu Shilang) and chief imperial scholar (翰林學士承旨, Hanlin Xueshi Chengzhi).

== Chancellorship and aftermaths ==
In 847, during the reign of Emperor Xuānzong, Wei Cong was made Zhongshu Shilang (中書侍郎), the deputy head of the legislative bureau of government (中書省, Zhongshu Sheng), and chancellor de facto with the designation Tong Zhongshu Menxia Pingzhangshi (同中書門下平章事). He was not a capable chancellor, however, and because of that, later in the year, he was removed from his chancellor position and made an advisor to the Crown Prince, with his office at the eastern capital Luoyang. He died while serving there.

== Notes and references ==
- New Book of Tang, vol. 182.
- Zizhi Tongjian, vol. 248.
