= Zhou Chi =

Chinese chancellor (793–851)

Zhou Chi (周墀; 793 – 23 March 851), courtesy name Desheng (Chinese: 德升), formally the Baron of Ru'nan (Chinese: 汝南男), was an official of the Chinese Tang dynasty, serving as a chancellor during the reign of Emperor Xuānzong.

== Background ==
Zhou Chi was born in 792, during the reign of Emperor Dezong. His family was originally from Ru'nan (汝南, in modern Zhumadian, Henan), and claimed ancestry from the royal family of Zhou dynasty, although the traceable part of Zhou Chi's male-line ancestry only went back to the Liang dynasty official Zhou Lingchao (周靈超). Subsequent ancestors of Zhou Chi's served as officials of Sui dynasty and Tang dynasty. Zhou Chi's grandfather Zhou Pei (周沛) served as an advisory official in the Tang imperial government, while his father Zhou Ting (周頲) served as an imperial guard officer. (Note: That Zhou Chi's grandfather was named Zhou Pei and father named Zhou Ting are based on the table of the chancellors' family trees in the New Book of Tang; Zhou's biography in the Old Book of Tang had the names reversed. Compare New Book of Tang, vol. 74 with Old Book of Tang, vol. 176.)

Zhou Chi lost his father early and was said to have served his mother piously. He passed the imperial examinations in the Jinshi class in 822, during the reign of Emperor Dezong's great-grandson Emperor Muzong. Thereafter, he served as a traveling review officer at Hunan Circuit (湖南, headquartered in modern Changsha, Hunan).

== During Emperor Wenzong's reign ==
At some point, probably during the reign of Emperor Muzong's son Emperor Wenzong, Zhou Chi was recalled to the capital Chang'an to serve as an imperial censor with the title Jiancha Yushi (監察御史), as well as an imperial scholar at Jianxian Hall (集賢殿). As Zhou was knowledgeable in history and was capable of writing in ancient styles, Emperor Wenzong respected him. When the chancellor Li Zongmin was sent out to Shannan West Circuit (山南西道, headquartered in modern Hanzhong, Shaanxi) to serve as its military governor (jiedushi), Li invited Zhou to serve as his military commander; Zhou was recalled to Chang'an about a year later. (Note: As Li Zongmin served as the military governor of Shannan West from 833 to 834, Zhou's service under him must have been during that time, and the timeframe would imply that he was recalled when Li was. See Old Book of Tang, vol. 176.) Subsequently, when Emperor Wenzong's associates Li Xun and Zheng Zhu became powerful, they had Li Zongmin and another chancellor, Li Deyu, exiled, and had officials they considered friendly to either expelled from government as well, but it was said that as they could find no fault in Zhou, they could not find an excuse to expel him. Zhou was subsequently made a chief imperial chronicler (起居舍人, Qiju Sheren), and then made Kaogong Yuanwailang (考功員外郎), a low-level official at the ministry of civil service affairs (吏部, Libu), but continued to serve as Qiju Sheren as well. It was said that Emperor Wenzong, after consulting with chancellors on policy issues, often consulted his attendants for their suggestions, and Zhou was one whose opinions that Emperor Wenzong valued greatly. He was subsequently made an imperial scholar with the title Hanlin Xueshi (翰林學士), and was put in charge of drafting edicts. In 839, there was an occasion when Emperor Wenzong, who was already ill at that point, asked Zhou was his opinion was about which ancient rulers Emperor Wenzong could be compared with. Zhou, in order to flatter Emperor Wenzong, responded that he could be compared to the mythical Emperor Yao and Emperor Shun. However, Emperor Wenzong, distressed at the control that the eunuchs had over his governance at that point, compared himself to King Nan of Zhou (the last king of Zhou dynasty) and Emperor Xian of Han (the last emperor of Han dynasty), much to Zhou Chi's shock.

== During Emperor Wuzong's reign ==
After Emperor Wenzong died in 840 and was succeeded by his brother Emperor Wuzong, Zhou Chi was sent out of Chang'an to serve as the prefect of Hua Prefecture (華州, in modern Weinan, Shaanxi), as well as the defender of Tong Pass. He was later made the governor (觀察使, Guanchashi) of Eyue Circuit (鄂岳, headquartered in modern Wuhan, Hubei), as well as the prefect of Eyue's capital E Prefecture (鄂州). In 846, he was made the governor of Jiangxi Circuit (江西, headquartered in modern Nanchang, Jiangxi), as well as the prefect of its capital Hong Prefecture (洪州). While serving there, he carefully supervised the prefects under him, and also stationed troops at Poyang Lake to curtail the banditry that was common there.

== During Emperor Xuānzong's reign ==
Early in the Dazhong era (847–860) of Emperor Wuzong's successor and uncle Emperor Xuānzong, Zhou Chi was made the military governor of Yicheng Circuit (義成, headquartered in modern Anyang, Henan) as well as the prefect of its capital Hua Prefecture (滑州); he was also given the honorary titles of minister of rites (禮部尚書, Libu Shangshu) and Shang Zhuguo (上柱國), and created the Baron of Ru'nan. He was thereafter recalled to Chang'an to serve as the deputy minister of defense (兵部侍郎, Bingbu Shilang) and the acting director of finances.

In 848, Zhou was made a chancellor de facto with the designation Tong Zhongshu Menxia Pingzhangshi (同中書門下平章事), while retaining his offices as the deputy minister of defense and director of finances. When he took office, he stated to the official Wei Ao (韋澳), who had previously served as his staff member, "I am personally weak but have great responsibility. What suggestions do you have for me?" Wei responded, "I hope you are powerless" – a response that shocked Zhou. Wei then explained that because, as chancellor, he was to be fair and acting in the best interest of the people, without regard for personal likes or dislikes, he would thus be powerless, if he were serving properly. Zhou agreed with Wei. Thereafter, he was made, in addition to his chancellor responsibilities, minister of justice (刑部尚書, Xingbu Shangshu) and Zhongshu Shilang (中書侍郎, the deputy head of the legislative bureau of government (中書省, Zhongshu Sheng)), and given the honorary title Yinqing Guanglu Daifu (銀青光祿大夫). He was also put in charge of editing the imperial history.

In 849, when Emperor Xuānzong wanted to know who, in the chancellors' opinions, were capable officials during the reign of his (and Emperor Muzong's) father Emperor Xianzong, Zhou opined that one of his predecessors as governor of Jiangxi Circuit, Wei Dan (韋丹), was capable and missed by the Jiangxi people long after his term. As a result, Emperor Xuānzong had the scholar Du Mu author text for a monument dedicated to Wei, and promoted Wei's son Wei Zhou (韋宙).

Meanwhile, though, Zhou was steadfast in his unwillingness to bow to the power of others – including his refusal to transfer the military governor Wang Zai from Hedong Circuit (河東, headquartered in modern Taiyuan, Shanxi) to Xuanwu Circuit (宣武, headquartered in modern Kaifeng, Henan) and give Wang an honorary chancellor title, as Wang had hoped; his refusal to let Emperor Xuānzong's brother-in-law Wei Rang (韋讓) become the mayor of Jingzhao Municipality (京兆, i.e., the Chang'an region) on the basis that Wei was not capable; and his disagreement with Emperor Xuānzong, who wanted to mobilize the army to recapture lands lost decades ago to Tufan. Emperor Xuānzong was offended, and later in 849 made Zhou the military governor of Dongchuan Circuit (東川, headquartered in modern Mianyang, Sichuan). After Zhou's commission was announced, Emperor Xuānzong's son-in-law, the imperial scholar Zheng Hao (鄭顥) commented, "Zhou Chi became chancellor due to his honest words, and also was removed from chancellorship due to his honest words." After Zheng's comment, Emperor Xuānzong, while not relenting in his order, bestowed Zhou the honorific title of You Pushe (右僕射).

After Zhou served there for a year, he considered retiring and returning to his home at the eastern capital Luoyang, but he then grew ill, and decided against retiring until he grew better. He never did, however, and he died in 851. He was given posthumous honors. He had been predeceased by his wife Lady Jiang, but was survived by two sons, Zhou Kuanrao (周寬饒) and Zhou Xianxi (周咸喜), both of whom served as imperial officials, as well as a daughter who married the official Xue Meng (薛蒙). His casket was returned to and buried in Luoyang in 851.
