= Pei Xiu (Tang dynasty) =

Tang dynasty official and chancellor (791–864)

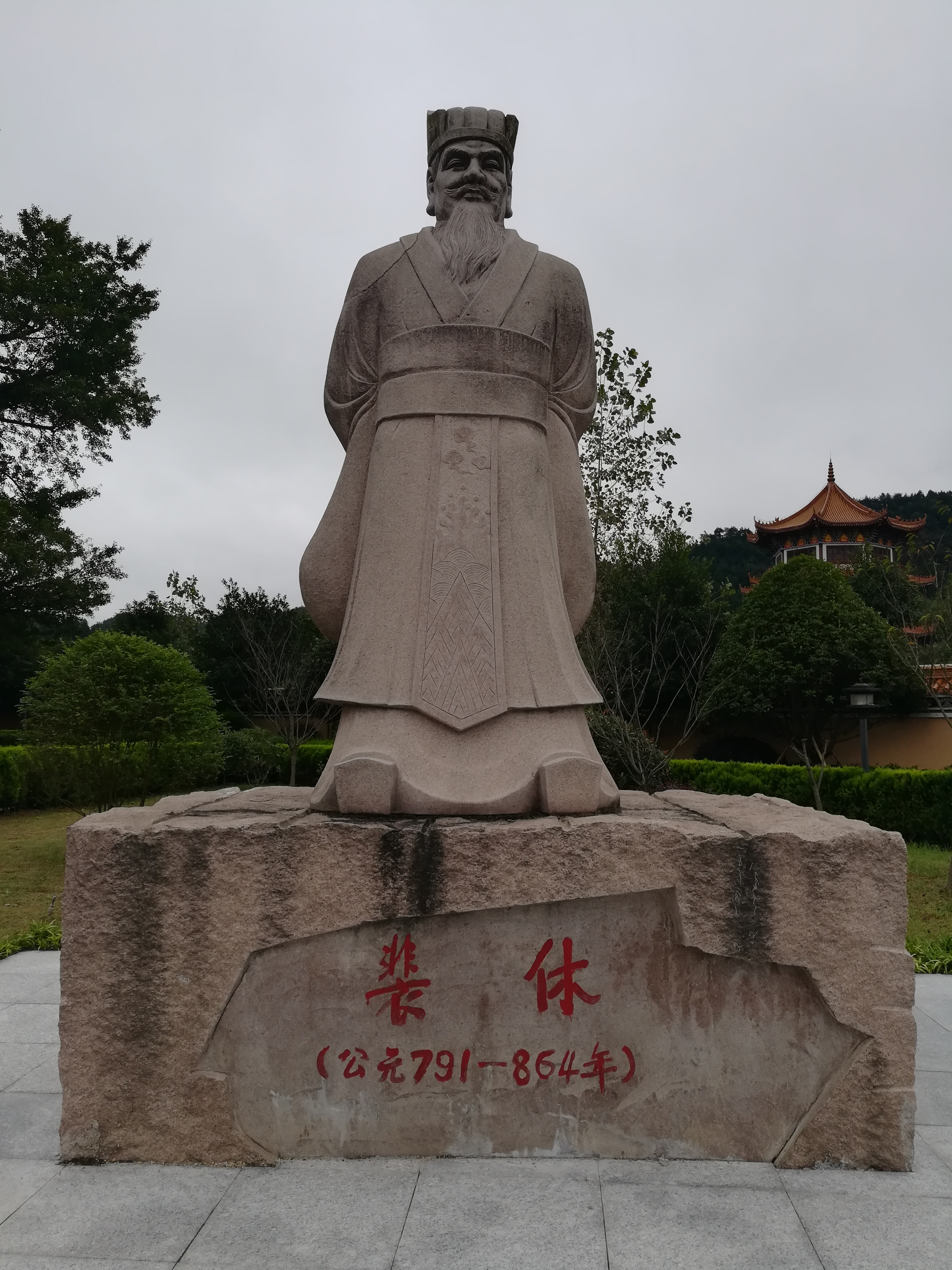
Statue of Pei Xiu in Miyin Temple

Pei Xiu (Chinese: 裴休; 791–864), courtesy name Gongmei (公美), formally the Viscount of Hedong (河東子), was a Chinese politician, literary figure, and Buddhist intellectual during the Tang dynasty, serving as a chancellor during the reign of Emperor Xuānzong. A prominent literatus and member of a prestigious aristocratic clan, Pei was considered a capable administrator and was credited with the skillful management of the Tang government's salt and iron monopoly. Pei was also a dedicated practitioner and patron of Chan Buddhism, pursuits which drew critique from later Confucian historians.

== Background and early career ==
Pei Xiu appeared to be born in about 791, during the reign of Emperor Dezong. He was from the Eastern Juan Pei of Pei clan of Hedong His grandfather Pei Xuan (裴宣) was not listed with any official titles, but his father Pei Su (裴肅) served as a governor during the reign of Emperor Dezong.

Pei Xiu was Pei Su's second of three known sons, and all three (Pei Xiu, his older brother Pei Chou (裴儔), and his younger brother Pei Qiu (裴俅)) eventually passed the imperial examinations in the Jinshi class. It was said that in youth, Pei Xiu was stern and righteous in his behavior. He and his brothers resided at his father's vacation home in Jiyuan, and Pei Xiu, in particular, rarely ventured outside it, studying the Confucian classics in the day and studying poetry in the evening. On one occasion, when someone gave the brothers a gift of venison, Pei Chou and Pei Qiu accepted the gift and summoned Pei Xiu to eat as well. Pei Xiu responded, "We are but poor students, and we do not even usually have enough for vegetarian meals. If we eat meat today and get used to it, how can we continue it in the future? I will not change my diet."

In the middle of the Changqing era (821–825) of Emperor Dezong's great-grandson Emperor Muzong, Pei Xiu passed the imperial examinations, and further passed a special examination for those considered righteous in their behaviors. Early in the Taihe era (827–835) of Emperor Muzong's son Emperor Wenzong, he served on the staffs of several regional governors, and he was at one point recalled to the capital Chang'an to serve as an imperial censor with the title Jiancha Yushi (監察御史); You Bujue (右補闕), an advisory official at the legislative bureau of government (中書省, Zhongshu Sheng); and an editor of imperial history. During the reign of Emperor Wenzong's brother Emperor Wuzong, he continued to serve in the imperial government, and later served several terms as prefectural prefects.

== During Emperor Xuānzong's reign ==
As of 851, during the reign of Emperor Wuzong's uncle Emperor Xuānzong, Pei Xiu was serving as the deputy minister of defense (兵部侍郎, Bingbu Shilang), when he was also made the director of salt and iron monopolies, who was also responsible for overseeing the food supply shipments from the Yangtze River–Huai River region to Chang'an and the eastern capital Luoyang. It was said that, by that time, due to various shipping problems that had developed over the decades since the capable chancellor Liu Yan, who died in 780, the supply of rice from the Yangtze-Huai region had dwindled to 400,000 Hu (斛) per year. Further, after arrival in the region, due to embezzlement and shipping accidents, only about 30–40% would reach the Wei River storages. In effect, the regulations that Liu had established had been abandoned. Pei investigated the various shipping problems, and revised the regulations into 10 sections. As a result of Pei's reforms, the supplies went back up to 1.2 million Hu per year. He also revised the regulations on the tea tax.

In 852, by which time Pei had been made the minister of rites (禮部尚書, Libu Shangshu), he was also given the designation Tong Zhongshu Menxia Pingzhangshi (同中書門下平章事), making him a chancellor de facto.

In 856, on an occasion when Emperor Xuānzong asked Pei to provide frank comments about his rule, Pei suggested that he create a crown prince—a suggestion that many key officials had made throughout the years, but Emperor Xuānzong had repeatedly resisted. Emperor Xuānzong responded to Pei, "If there were a crown prince, I would become redundant and useless." Pei did not dare to speak again on the subject, and subsequently offered to resign on reason of illness, but Emperor Xuānzong did not approve his resignation at the time. Later in the year, however, Emperor Xuānzong removed him from the chancellor position and made him the military governor (Jiedushi) of Xuanwu Circuit (宣武, headquartered in modern Kaifeng, Henan), continuing to carry the Tong Zhongshu Menxia Pingzhangshi title as an honorary title. Yet later that year, Emperor Xuānzong gave him the honorary titles Jinzi Guanglu Daifu (金紫光祿大夫) and Shang Zhuguo (上柱國), and created him the Viscount of Hedong, but further removed him from being the military governor of Xuanwu, instead making him an advisor to the crown prince—an entirely honorary title as there was still no crown prince at the time—with his office at Luoyang.

In 857, Pei was made the military governor of Zhaoyi Circuit (昭義, headquartered in modern Changzhi, Shanxi). In 859, he was transferred to Hedong Circuit (河東, headquartered in modern Taiyuan, Shanxi) and also made the mayor of its capital Taiyuan Municipality. In 860, he was transferred to Fengxiang Circuit (鳳翔, headquartered in modern Baoji, Shaanxi) and also made the mayor of its capital Fengxiang Municipality.

== After Emperor Xuānzong's reign ==
Early in the Xiantong era (860–874) of Emperor Xuānzong's son Emperor Yizong, Pei Xiu was recalled to Chang'an to serve as minister of census (戶部尚書, Hubu Shangshu). He later served as the minister of civil service affairs (吏部尚書, Lìbu Shangshu, note different tone than the minister of rites) and senior advisor to the crown prince. He died at the age of 73, probably in 864.

== Other activities ==
It was said that Pei Xiu was gracious and valued leniency while he was governing. He was a capable calligrapher. His family had been Buddhists for generations, and it was said that Pei was particularly devout in his study of the sutras. As both Taiyuan and Fengxiang had many important temples nearby, he, while he governed at those cities, would take time to visit those temples and speak with the monks about Buddhist doctrine. Ever since his middle age, he did not eat animal products, and stayed away from many desires. Both he and his friend, the minister Hegan Gao (紇幹皐), signed their names by using dharma names, a practice that both impressed and was criticized by the people at the time.

== Notes and references ==
- Old Book of Tang, vol. 177.
- New Book of Tang, vol. 182.
- Zizhi Tongjian, vol. 249.
