= Bai Minzhong =

Chancellor of Tang Dynasty

Bai Minzhong (白敏中; 792–861), courtesy name Yonghui (用誨), formally Duke Chou of Taiyuan (太原醜公), was a Chinese politician of the Tang dynasty, serving as a chancellor during the reigns of Emperor Xuānzong and Emperor Xuānzong's son Emperor Yizong. He was a second cousin of the renowned poet Bai Juyi.

== Background and early career ==
Bai Minzhong was born in 792, during the reign of Emperor Dezong. His family was originally from Taiyuan. The family traced its ancestry to the great Qin general Bai Qi, but the traceable parts of the ancestry went back to the Northern Zhou official Bai Jian (白建). Bai Minzhong's grandfather Bai Lin (白鏻) served as an officer at Yang Prefecture (揚州, in modern Yangzhou, Jiangsu), while his father Bai Jikang (白季康) served as a county magistrate. Bai Lin and the great poet Bai Juyi's grandfather Bai Huang (白鍠) were sons of Bai Wen (白溫), making Bai Minzhong and Bai Juyi, who was older than Bai Minzhong, second cousins.

Bai Minzhong lost his father early, and he apparently was effectively raised by his older brothers or cousins. Early in the Changqing era (821–824) of Emperor Dezong's great-grandson Emperor Muzong, he passed the imperial examinations in the Jinshi class, and he subsequently served on the staff of the general Li Ting (李聽), while Li Ting served three terms as circuit military governor (Jiedushi). He later served as Dali Pingshi (大理評事), a judge at the supreme court (大理寺, Dali Si). In 833, during the reign of Emperor Muzong's son Emperor Wenzong, when Bai's mother died, he left governmental service and took up resident at Xiagui (下邽, in modern Weinan, Shaanxi).

== During Emperor Wuzong's reign ==
Early in the Huichang era (841–846) of Emperor Wenzong's brother Emperor Wuzong, Bai Minzhong returned to governmental service to serve as an imperial censor with the title Dianzhong Shiyushi (殿中侍御史), with his office at the eastern capital Luoyang. Soon thereafter, he was recalled to Chang'an to serve as Hubu Yuanwailang (戶部員外郎), a low-level official at the ministry of census (戶部, Hubu).

At that time, Li Deyu was the leading chancellor. Emperor Wuzong had long admired Bai Juyi and wanted to make Bai Juyi a chancellor, and he requested Li Deyu's opinion. Li Deyu had long disliked Bai Juyi, and therefore argued that Bai Juyi was old and ill, and thus unsuitable to bear the chancellor responsibilities; instead, he recommended Bai Minzhong, arguing that Bai Minzhong was just as talented in literature as Bai Juyi and also was good understanding of governance. In 842, therefore, Emperor Wuzong made Bai Minzhong an imperial scholar (翰林學士, Hanlin Xueshi). He was later made Zhongshu Sheren (中書舍人), a mid-level official at the legislative bureau of government (中書省, Zhongshu Sheng), and yet later made the deputy minister of defense (兵部侍郎, Bingbu Shilang) as well as chief imperial scholar (翰林學士承旨, Hanlin Xueshi Chengzhi).

== During Emperor Xuānzong's reign ==
Shortly after Emperor Wuzong's death in 846 and succession by his uncle Emperor Xuānzong, Bai Minzhong was made a chancellor de facto with the designation Tong Zhongshu Menxia Pingzhangshi (同中書門下平章事). He was also created the Duke of Taiyuan. Soon thereafter, Emperor Xuānzong, who had long despised Li Deyu's hold on power, demoted him out of the capital. It was said that Bai took this opportunity to seek out evidence of Li Deyu's guilt while Li Deyu served as chancellor, and in 847, as a result, Li Deyu was demoted from being the defender of Luoyang to the title of advisor to the Crown Prince—an entirely honorary post as there was no crown prince at the time—with his office at Luoyang. It was also said that, with Bai as the leading chancellor, officials that Li Deyu had long refused to promote were being promoted, including Ma Zhi, Cui Yuanshi, and Wei Cong. At Emperor Xuānzong's prompting (as Emperor Xuānzong remembered the deceased official Linghu Chu), Bai also recommended Linghu's son Linghu Tao.

In 848, Grand Empress Dowager Guo—the wife of Emperor Muzong's and Emperor Xuānzong's father Emperor Xianzong—died. Because Emperor Xuānzong's mother Empress Dowager Zheng was still alive and, having served as Grand Empress Dowager Guo's servant girl previously and having resented her, Bai, in order to please Emperor Xuānzong, advocated that Grand Empress Dowager Guo not be buried with Emperor Xianzong and not be worshipped at his temple. When the official Wang Hao (王皞) objected, Wang offended both Emperor Xuānzong and Bai and was demoted. Grand Empress Dowager Guo was subsequently buried at Emperor Xianzong's tomb, but not worshipped at his temple.

In 850, in addition to his responsibilities as chancellor, Bai was put in charge of the imperial reserve that Emperor Xuānzong had set aside for border defenses.

In 851, when Emperor Xuānzong was becoming weary of repeated Dangxiang rebellions in the northwestern regions, Bai's fellow chancellor Cui Xuan suggested that a senior official be commissioned to oversee the operations against the Dangxiang. Emperor Xuānzong thus made Bai the military governor of Binning Circuit (邠寧, headquartered in modern Xianyang, Shaanxi) and the supreme commander of the operations against the Dangxiang. At Bai's request, citing the example of Pei Du, Bai was allowed to retain a number of talented imperial government officials to serve on his staff. However, he was concerned that once he left Chang'an, the imperial scholar Zheng Hao (鄭顥), the husband of Emperor Xuānzong's daughter Princess Wanshou, would defame him. (Previously, Zheng had contracted to marry a woman from one of the most honored clans at that time, the Lu clan, when Bai, in response to Emperor Xuānzong's question as to who could make an appropriate husband for Princess Wanshou, recommended Zheng. Zheng, who had departed Chang'an to marry Lady Lu, was subsequently summoned back to the capital and required to marry Princess Wanshou. As Zheng did not want to marry Princess Wanshou, he resented Bai from this point on.) Emperor Xuānzong, to allay his concerns, gave him a small wooden box containing accusations that Zheng had already submitted against Bai and pointed out that if he had believed Zheng, Bai would not have remained in power; it was said that Bai took the box home and offered incense to it in gratitude.

Later in the year, Bai reported that the Dangxiang rebels had all agreed to submit, and at his request, Emperor Xuānzong issued a general pardon for the Dangxiang. Emperor Xuānzong subsequently relieved him of the title of supreme commander of the forces against Dangxiang (as unnecessary), and kept him at Binning Circuit as its military governor, allowing him to retain the title of chancellor and that of Sikong (司空, one of the Three Excellencies) as honorary titles. In 852, Bai was transferred to Xichuan Circuit (西川, headquartered in modern Chengdu, Sichuan), and also served as the mayor of its capital Chengdu Municipality. In 857, he was transferred to Jingnan Circuit (荊南, headquartered in modern Jingzhou, Hubei), and also served as the mayor of its capital Jiangling Municipality (江陵).

== During Emperor Yizong's reign ==
Emperor Xuānzong died in 859 and was succeeded by his son Emperor Yizong. In the aftermaths of Emperor Xuānzong's death, Linghu Tao, who had dominated the court scene after Bai Minzhong's departure from Chang'an, was attacked by many others for alleged abuses of power. As a result, Emperor Yizong sent Linghu out of the capital and recalled Bai to Chang'an to serve as chancellor, with the titles of Tong Zhongshu Menxia Pingzhangshi, Menxia Shilang (門下侍郎, the deputy head of the examination bureau (門下省, Menxia Sheng)), and Situ (司徒, also one of the Three Excellencies). He arrived in Chang'an early in 860, but subsequently suffered a waist injury when he fell while climbing up the stairs at the imperial hall, and he had to be taken home in a litter. Over the next several months, Bai submitted repeated petitions to resign, which Emperor Yizong did not accept. The advisory official Wang Pu (王譜) subsequently submitted a petition arguing that Bai's injury made it inappropriate for him to remain chancellor—implying that Bai's resignations were not sincere. This offended Bai, and subsequently Emperor Yizong demoted Wang, and the other chancellors upheld the demotion due to Wang's offense against Bai, despite objections by the imperial attendant Zheng Gongyu (鄭公輿). Later in the year, after Bai submitted a fifth petition to resign, Emperor Yizong granted him the even greater chancellor title of Zhongshu Ling (中書令, head of the legislative bureau) as well as Situ.

In 861, with the southwestern circuits under attack from Nanzhao, Emperor Yizong convened an imperial meeting to discuss responses, and Bai attended the meeting, with imperial guard soldiers assisting him in getting into the imperial hall. Thereafter, Emperor Yizong finally removed him from the post of chancellor, and made him the military governor of Fengxiang Circuit (鳳翔, headquartered in modern Baoji, Shaanxi), allowing him to retain the Zhongshu Ling title as an honorary title. He subsequently made further attempts to resign, and he was made the defender of Luoyang, but he declined to report to that post, and was allowed to retire with the honorary title of Taifu (太傅). Before the edict permitting the retirement arrived, though, he died in 862. He was given posthumous honors, although the ceremonial scholar Cao Ye (曹鄴), arguing that Bai had not sincerely yielded the chancellor post after becoming ill and had instigated Wang's exile, gave him the unflattering posthumous name of Chou (醜, "abusive").

== Notes and references ==
- Old Book of Tang, vol. 166.
- New Book of Tang, vol. 119.
- Zizhi Tongjian, vols. 246, 248, 249, 250.
