= Linghu Tao =

Linghu Tao (traditional Chinese: 令狐綯; simplified Chinese: 令狐绹; pinyin: Línghú Táo), courtesy name Zizhi (子直), formally the Duke of Zhao (趙公), was an official of the Chinese Tang dynasty. He was the leading chancellor during the last nine years of the reign of Emperor Xuānzong but was removed from his chancellor position after Emperor Xuānzong's death, subsequently serving several terms as military governor (Jiedushi) in the circuits.

== Background and early career ==
It is not known when Linghu Tao was born. He was probably the second son of Linghu Chu, who was a prominent official under several emperors, including serving as chancellor during the reign of Emperor Xianzong, and Linghu Tao had an older brother named Linghu Xu (令狐緒). His family descended from Linghu Zheng, an aristocrat from the north-western Dunhuang Commandery(Linghu clan of Dunhuang).

Linghu Tao passed the imperial examinations in the Jinshi class in 830, during the reign of Emperor Xianzong's grandson Emperor Wenzong. He was thereafter made a copyeditor at Hongwen Pavilion (弘文館). Early in Emperor Wenzong's Kaifeng era (836-840), he served as Zuo Shiyi (左拾遺), a low-level advisory official at the examination bureau of government (門下省, Menxia Sheng). When Linghu Chu died in 837, he left governmental service to observe a period of mourning. After the period was over, he was given his old office back, and then promoted to Zuo Bujue (左補闕) and also made an editor of imperial histories. He later was made Kubu Yuanwailang (庫部員外郎) and then Hubu Yuanwailang (戶部員外郎), both low-level offices at the ministry of census (戶部, Hubu). In 845, during the reign of Emperor Wenzong's brother Emperor Wuzong, he was sent out of the capital Chang'an to serve as the prefect of Hu Prefecture (湖州, in modern Huzhou, Jiangsu).

== During Emperor Xuānzong's reign ==
=== Before chancellorship ===
In 847 or 848, when Emperor Wuzong's uncle (Emperor Xianzong's younger son) Emperor Xuānzong was emperor, there was an occasion when Emperor Xuānzong was recalling the events at Emperor Xianzong’s funeral with the chancellor Bai Minzhong. Emperor Xuānzong stated that he remembered an official who, during a storm during the funeral procession, held onto Emperor Xianzong's casket and did not let go even as everyone else was scattering, and Bai stated that it was Linghu Chu. When Emperor Xuānzong then asked whether Linghu Chu had sons and whether the sons had capability to be chancellor, Bai mentioned Linghu Xu and Linghu Tao, and further opined that Linghu Xu had long been debilitated by arthritis, but that Linghu Tao was capable. Emperor Xuānzong then promoted Linghu Tao to be Kaogong Langzhong (考功郎中, a supervisory official at the ministry of civil service affairs (吏部, Libu)) and put him in charge of drafting edicts. When Linghu Tao met with Emperor Xuānzong to thank him, Emperor Xuānzong further asked him about the events during Emperor Xianzong's reign; Linghu was able to recount them in detail. This pleased Emperor Xuānzong, who began to consider him for even higher promotions.

In 848, Linghu was made an imperial scholar (翰林學士, Hanlin Xueshi). There was an occasion when Emperor Xuānzong was asking Linghu to read him what Linghu would consider to be the key part of the Golden Mirror (金鏡) — a work authored by Emperor Xuānzong's distinguished ancestor Emperor Taizong — when Linghu read, "If the state is in confusion, it is not necessarily the case that you have commissioned those who are inappropriate; if the state is being governed well, it is not necessarily the case that you have commissioned those who are faithful and wise." Emperor Xuānzong approved of this selection greatly. In 849, Linghu was made Zhongshu Sheren (中書舍人), a mid-level official at the legislative bureau (中書省, Zhongshu Sheng) and created the Baron of Pengyang, and soon thereafter made deputy chief imperial censor (御史中丞, Yushi Zhongcheng). In 850, he was made the deputy minister of census (戶部侍郎) and put in charge of tax collection.

=== Chancellorship ===
Also in 850, by which time Linghu Tao was referred to as deputy minister of defense (兵部侍郎, Bingbu Shilang) as well as chief imperial scholar (翰林學士承旨, Hanlin Xueshi Chengzhi), he made a chancellor de facto with the designation Tong Zhongshu Menxia Pingzhangshi (同中書門下平章事). For the next nine years, Linghu would serve as, in effect, the leading chancellor. At one point, Emperor Xuānzong, who was considered a relatively forceful emperor, discussed with Linghu the possibility of slaughtering the eunuchs, whose control over imperial governance and vanguard army had grown over the years. Linghu feared that a general slaughter would victimize the innocent as well as the guilty, and therefore instead advocated, in a secret report to Emperor Xuānzong, that he should instead eliminate the eunuchs by attrition — by punishing those who were guilty and by not replenishing their ranks. When the eunuchs became aware of this report, however, they were nevertheless resentful of Linghu and the other officials that they considered to be behind the report.

In 857, Linghu's chancellor colleague Wei Mo was removed from his chancellor position and made the military governor (Jiedushi) of Xichuan Circuit (西川, headquartered in modern Chengdu, Sichuan), purportedly because Wei was strict and blunt, causing apprehension by Linghu.

In 858, there was an occasion when Emperor Xuānzong wanted to declare a general pardon, which Linghu opposed on the basis of the expense involved (as general pardons customarily required bestowing of rewards to imperial guard soldiers) and that the state should not have repeated pardons without good reasons. (Emperor Xuānzong had previously declared general pardons four times in his reign — in 847, 848, 850, and 853.) When Linghu's colleague Cui Shenyou subsequently suggested that if Emperor Xuānzong created one of his sons Crown Prince then that would be a good reason to declare a general pardon, Emperor Xuānzong, who did not want to create a crown prince, was displeased with Cui and subsequently removed Cui from his chancellor position, but nothing occurred to Linghu. Still, Linghu, despite his lengthy service under Emperor Xuānzong, was continuously apprehensive of the emperor's strictness as well. On one occasion, when Linghu violated Emperor Xuānzong's order that when prefectural prefects who were being transferred from one prefecture to another, the prefect were to come to Chang'an so that Emperor Xuānzong could personally review their reports, Emperor Xuānzong made sarcastic remarks that the chancellor had abrogated imperial orders but carried out no negative actions against Linghu.

During Linghu's term as chancellor, his sons Linghu Hao (令狐滈), Linghu Huan (令狐渙), and Linghu Feng (令狐渢), in order to avoid appearances of favoritism or nepotism, did not submit themselves for imperial examinations. Still, Linghu Hao, in particular, developed a reputation for living luxuriously, receiving bribes, and influencing his father's governance, particularly because he was also related by marriage to the influential imperial scholar Zheng Hao (鄭顥), who was Emperor Xuānzong's son-in-law. It was said that because of this, the officials and the people had much resentment for Linghu Tao as well. By the end of Emperor Xuānzong's reign, Linghu was also, in addition to being chancellor, minister of civil service affairs (吏部尚書, Libu Shangshu), You Pushe (右僕射, one of the heads of the executive bureau (尚書省, Shangshu Sheng)), and the Duke of Liang.

== During Emperor Yizong's reign ==
Emperor Xuānzong died in 859 and was succeeded by his son Emperor Yizong; during the brief mourning period, Linghu Tao served as regent. Later in the year, with many officials having resented Linghu for his long hold on power and Linghu Hao's lifestyle, there were many accusations against Linghu Tao. As a result, Linghu was removed from his chancellor position and sent to Hezhong Circuit (河中, headquartered in modern Yuncheng, Shanxi) to serve as its military governor, continuing to carry the Tong Zhongshu Menxia Pingzhangshi title as an honorary title; he was also made the mayor of Hezhong's capital Hezhong Municipality. In 861, he was made the military governor of Xuanwu Circuit (宣武, headquartered in modern Kaifeng, Henan), as well as the prefect of its capital Bian Prefecture (汴州). In 862, he was made the deputy military governor of Huainan Circuit (淮南, headquartered in modern Yangzhou, acting as military governor.

In 863, Linghu Hao had, after finally submitting himself for imperial examinations and passed in the Jinshi class, been made Zuo Shiyi (左拾遺) — which led to many objections by advisory officials, pointing out Linghu Hao's misdeeds while Linghu Tao was chancellor. Linghu Hao, in fear, declined the position and was made an assistant to the Crown Prince's head of household. In 864, Linghu Tao submitted a petition defending Linghu Hao; as a result, Emperor Yizong demoted two of the officials who were harshest in their criticism against Linghu Hao, Zhang Yun (張雲) and Liu Shui (劉蛻).

In 868, expeditionary soldiers sent from Xusi Circuit (徐泗, headquartered in modern Xuzhou, Jiangsu) to help defend the border with Nanzhao at Gui Prefecture (桂州, in modern Guilin, Guangxi), angry that they had been stationed there for four consecutive years (one more year past the originally promised term of three years) and were set to be stationed there for yet another year, mutinied under the leadership of the officer Pang Xun and headed back toward Xusi. As they passed through Linghu's Huainan Circuit, Linghu placated them by supplying them with food, despite suggestions by his officer Li Xiang (李湘) that he should attack and destroy them, as Linghu only wanted them to spare Huainan. Subsequently, when the mutineers openly rebelled and attacked Xusi's prefectures, including capturing the capital Xu Prefecture (徐州) and putting Si Prefecture (泗州, in modern Huai'an, Jiangsu) under siege, Emperor Yizong ordered Huainan troops to help relieve Si Prefecture. Linghu sent troops, with Li commanding them, along with the eunuch monitor Guo Houben (郭厚本). The Xusi mutineers, however, defeated the Huainan troops and captured most of them, including Li and Guo, whose hands and feet they cut off. Linghu was able to buy some time to recover by convincing Pang that he was going to request that Emperor Yizong pardon and officially commission Pang. Still, given his defeat, he was soon replaced by Ma Ju (馬舉). He was given the honorary title of Taibao (太保) but with his office at the eastern capital Luoyang.

== During Emperor Xizong's reign ==
In 875, by which time Emperor Yizong's son Emperor Xizong was emperor, Linghu Tao was made the military governor of Fengxiang Circuit (鳳翔, headquartered in modern Baoji, Shaanxi), and the mayor of its capital Fengxiang Municipality. He was also created the Duke of Zhao, and reconferred the Tong Zhongshu Menxia Pingzhangshi title as an honorary title. In 876, with the Tang governmental troops deeply engaged against the agrarian rebels under Wang Xianzhi and Huang Chao, Emperor Yizong had Linghu and Li Kan (李侃) the military governor of Binning Circuit (邠寧, headquartered in modern Xianyang, Shaanxi), select 1,000 infantry soldiers and 500 cavalry soldiers to help defend Tong Pass against a possible attack by the agrarian rebels. That was the last historical record of an act by Linghu, who died while still serving at Fengxiang Circuit, at the age of 77, and was given posthumous honors, but the year was not known.

== Notes and references ==
- Old Book of Tang, vol. 172.
- New Book of Tang, vol. 166.
- Zizhi Tongjian, vols. 248, 249, 250, 251, 252.
