= Gai Yu =

Gai Yu (Chinese: 蓋寓) (died 905), formally the Duke of Chengyang (成陽公), was a key strategist of Li Keyong, a major warlord late in the Chinese Tang dynasty.

== Background ==
It is not known when Gai Yu was born, but it was known that he was from Wei Prefecture (蔚州, in modern Zhangjiakou, Hebei), and that both his grandfather Gai Zuo (蓋祚) and father Gai Qing (蓋慶) served as officer at Wei Prefecture. When the ethnically-Shatuo officer Li Keyong rose against Duan Wenchu (段文楚) the defender of Datong Circuit (大同, headquartered at Datong, Shanxi) (which Wei Prefecture belonged to) at Datong's capital Yun Prefecture (雲州) in 878, Gai was one of the proponents, and he became a close associate of Li's.

== Services under Li Keyong ==
After Li Keyong resubmitted to Tang authority and was made the military governor (Jiedushi) of Yanmen Circuit (t 雁門道 or 鴈門道, s 雁门道, Yànmén Dào) around present-day Datong in 882, he made Gai Yu a base supervisor as well as the prefect of Lan Prefecture (嵐州, in modern Lüliang, Shanxi). After Li Keyong was later made the military governor of Hedong Circuit (河東, headquartered in modern Taiyuan, Shanxi), Gai continued as a base supervisor. It was said that Li Keyong consulted him on all important matters and listened to his suggestions, and that he accompanied Li Keyong on all campaigns.

In 885, after a dispute between the powerful eunuch Tian Lingzi and Li Keyong's ally Wang Chongrong the military governor of Huguo Circuit (護國, headquartered in modern Yuncheng, Shanxi) erupted into an armed conflict, Wang Chongrong's and Li Keyong's forces defeated the forces of Tian and his allies Zhu Mei the military governor of Jingnan Circuit (靜難, headquartered in modern Xianyang, Shaanxi) and Li Changfu the military governor of Fengxiang Circuit (鳳翔, headquartered in modern Baoji, Shaanxi). Fearful of Wang Chongrong's and Li Keyong's approaching forces, Tian took then-reigning Emperor Xizong and fled to Xingyuan (興元, in modern Hanzhong, Shaanxi). Zhu broke his relationship with Tian and Emperor Xizong, took over the imperial capital Chang'an, and instead supported Emperor Xizong's distant relative Li Yun the Prince of Xiang as the new emperor. Zhu elicited support for Li Yun from the various regional governors, and when his emissary reached Hedong, Gai pointed out that the people of the realm had blamed Li Keyong for chasing Emperor Xizong out of Chang'an and that the only way for Li Keyong to clear himself in their eyes would be to see to Zhu's and Li Yun's destruction. Under Gai's suggestion, Li Keyong burned Li Yun's edict and put Zhu's emissary under arrest, and instead issued a declaration that supported Emperor Xizong and vowing to destroy Zhu. This helped to affirm Emperor Xizong's status as the legitimate emperor. Subsequently, Zhu was assassinated by his own subordinate Wang Xingyu, and Li Yun was killed by Wang Chongrong, allowing Emperor Xizong to return to Chang'an.

In 894, Gai suggested that Li Keyong support the former Lulong Circuit (盧龍, headquartered in modern Beijing) officer Liu Rengong, who had fled to Hedong after an unsuccessful attempt to take over the circuit, in his endeavors to capture the circuit against Li Kuangchou. Li Keyong agreed, and after a campaign against Li Kuangchou took over Lulong and gave it to Liu to rule as his vassal. (However, Liu would betray Li Keyong in 897 and became independent.)

In 895, Li Keyong waged a successful campaign against Wang Xingyu (who had succeeded Zhu as the military governor of Jingnan) and Li Maozhen, the military governor of Fengxiang (who had succeeded Li Changfu) after they had marched on Chang'an and killed the chancellors Li Xi and Wei Zhaodu.Then-reigning Emperor Zhaozong (Emperor Xizong's brother and successor) created Li Keyong the Prince of Jin and bestowed many titles on his followers. As part of this, Gai was made the governor (觀察使, Guanchashi) of Rong District (容管, in modern Yulin, Guangxi), but did not actually report there. He was also created a marquess. As the Song dynasty historian Sima Guang described in his Zizhi Tongjian as Gai's standing with Li Keyong at that point:

Li Keyong was impatient and harsh, and his attendants were often put to death for minor faults, so none dared to disobey him. Only Gai Yu was intelligent and dextrous, capable of understanding his will. He would counsel Li in roundabout and careful ways, such that Li would agree with his advice. If Li was angry at an officer or an official for something that was not that person's fault, Gai would outwardly act as if he were as angry as Li, and then induce Li to release the person. If he had suggestions to correct Li's behavior, he would use recent events as analogies to allow Li to understand. Li loved and trusted him. Within Li's realm, he had as much power as Li. Whenever the imperial government or nearby circuits sent emissaries to Hedong, the first gifts would first go to Li, and then the second gifts to Gai. Zhu Quanzhong (Li Keyong's archenemy, the military governor of Xuanwu Circuit (宣武, headquartered in modern Kaifeng, Henan) tried to send spies to alienate Li from Gai, at times claiming that Gai was about to take over Li's realm. When Li heard this, he treated Gai even better.

Shortly afterwards, when many of Li Keyong's subordinates suggested that he should head to Chang'an to pay homage to the emperor, Gai argued against it, pointing out that this would cause the people of Chang'an to be disturbed, as they would not be able to discern Li Keyong's intentions. Li Keyong agreed and withdrew back to Hedong Circuit. Meanwhile, when Li Keyong's general Li Hanzhi requested the military governorship of Jingnan, but Li Keyong declined on the basis that the imperial government had already commissioned Su Wenjian (蘇文建), Li Hanzhi complained to Gai. Gai, fearful that Li Hanzhi would eventually rebel, tried several times to speak on his behalf with Li Keyong, but Li Keyong refused to grant Li Hanzhi a military governorship, believing that doing so would hasten Li Hanzhi's betrayal. (Li Hanzhi did, as Gai feared, seize Zhaoyi Circuit (昭義, headquartered in modern Changzhi, Shanxi) in 898, turn against Li Keyong, and submit to Zhu Quanzhong.

In 897, Emperor Zhaozong upgraded Rong District to Ningyuan Circuit (寧遠) and made Gai its military governor. Subsequently, Emperor Zhaozong also created him the Duke of Chengyang.

Gai died in 905. In his will, he advised Li Keyong to reduce construction projects, lower taxes and levies, and seek out wise counselors. After Li Keyong's son and successor Emperor Zhuangzong of Later Tang founded Later Tang, he gave Gai posthumous honors.
