= Xiao Gou =

Xiao Gou (Chinese: 蕭遘) (died April 6, 887), courtesy name Desheng (得聖), was a politician of the late Tang dynasty, serving as a chancellor and senior financial official during the turbulent reign of Emperor Xizong. A forceful politician and the scion of a prestigious aristocratic family, Xiao survived factional infighting that jeopardized his early career to become a ranking official at Emperor Xizong's court. When the imperial capital of Chang'an fell to rebel forces in early 881, Xiao managed to escape the city and reunite with Emperor Xizong, who appointed him to oversee the imperial treasury and, later, as chancellor at the imperial court-in-exile in Chengdu. Xiao worked aggressively to reform the imperial government and strengthen its position, and remained chancellor when the court eventually returned to Chang'an, but clashed with the powerful palace eunuch Tian Lingzi and found many of his efforts frustrated. When Emperor Xizong was once again ousted from the capital, a disillusioned Xiao declined to follow him into exile but also refused active service at the court of the pretender Li Yun. Nevertheless, when Li Yun's usurpation was suppressed, Xiao was accused of complicity in the rebellion by his rival Kong Wei and was forced to commit suicide.

== Background ==
It is not known when Xiao Gou was born. He came from a prominent family that descended from the imperial house of the Liang dynasty, and, just among his direct male-line ancestors, his father Xiao Zhi, Xiao Zhi's grandfather Xiao Fu, and Xiao Fu's grandfather Xiao Song were all chancellors.

== During Emperor Yizong's reign ==
Xiao Gou himself passed the imperial examinations in the Jinshi class in 864, during the reign of Emperor Yizong, in the same year as fellow future chancellor Wei Baoheng. Xiao thereafter served on the staff of a military governor (jiedushi) of Hedong Circuit (河東, headquartered in modern Taiyuan, Shanxi), and was later recalled to the capital Chang'an to serve as You Shiyi (右拾遺), a low-level advisory official at the legislative bureau of government (中書省, Zhongshu Sheng), and later was made an imperial chronicler (起居舍人, Qiju Sheren).

Xiao Gou was said to be handsome and ambitious, and he often compared himself to the deceased chancellor Li Deyu. As a result, his colleagues often jokingly referred him as Taiwei (太尉, one of the Three Excellencies, and a title that Li Deyu was well known for). This, and the fact that Xiao and the other Jinshi examinees of the same year did not highly regard Wei, caused Wei to be resentful of him. After Wei became chancellor in 870 due to his marriage with Emperor Yizong's favorite daughter Princess Tongchang, Wei carried out a series of reprisals against officials who he felt had slighted him, and in 872, as part of the reprisals against the chancellor Yu Cong, Wei also had Xiao exiled under the claim that Xiao was a close associate of Yu's, to be the military advisor to the prefect of Bo Prefecture (播州, in modern Zunyi, Guizhou).

== During Emperor Xizong's reign ==
=== Prior to chancellorship ===
After Emperor Yizong died in 873 and was succeeded by his young son Emperor Xizong, Xiao Gou was recalled to Chang'an to serve as Libu Yuanwailang (禮部員外郎), a low-level official at the minister of rites (禮部, Lǐbu). He was then made Kaogong Yuanwailang (考功員外郎), a low-level official at the minister of civil service affairs (吏部, Lìbu, note different tone) and put in charge of drafting edicts. Early in the Qianfu era (874–879), he was made an imperial scholar (翰林學士, Hanlin Xueshi) and Zhongshu Sheren (中書舍人), a mid-level official at the legislative bureau. He was eventually promoted to be deputy minister of census (戶部侍郎, Hubu Shilang) and chief imperial scholar (翰林學士承旨, Hanlin Xueshi Chengzhi).

In late 880, the major agrarian rebel Huang Chao attacked Chang'an, and Emperor Xizong fled toward Chengdu. Xiao followed Emperor Xizong. At that time, as the imperial treasury in exile was lacking funds, Emperor Xizong made him deputy minister of defense (兵部侍郎, Bingbu Shilang) and acting director of finances. After Emperor Xizong arrived in Chengdu in spring 881, Xiao was made a chancellor de facto with the designation Tong Zhongshu Menxia Pingzhangshi (同中書門下平章事), as well as Zhongshu Shilang (中書侍郎), the deputy head of the legislative bureau. He was also made the minister of civil service affairs (吏部尚書, Lìbu Shangshu) and put in charge of editing the imperial history.

=== Chancellorship ===
It was said that Xiao Gou strived to reform the imperial government, and Emperor Xizong respected him. However, he served during a time when the imperial authority was dwindling, and in 883, there was an incident in which Shi Pu the military governor of Ganhua Circuit (感化, headquartered in modern Xuzhou, Jiangsu)—who had seized the circuit from the imperially-commissioned military governor Zhi Xiang (支詳) in 881—had suffered food poisoning. He suspected his staff member Li Ninggu (李凝古), who had been commissioned by Zhi, of poisoning him, and therefore killed Li Ninggu. At that time, Li Ninggu's father Li Sun (李損) was serving as an advisory official in the imperial government at Chengdu, and Shi bribed the powerful eunuch Tian Lingzi, wanting to have Li Sun put to death as well. The imperial censor Wang Hua (王華), however, refused to consent to Li Sun's execution or Tian's demand that Li Sun be transferred to the custody of the Shence Armies (神策軍), which were under Tian's command. Xiao supported Wang, and further pointed out that not only was there insufficient evidence that Li Ninggu had anything to do with Shi's poisoning, but that given the long distance between father and son, Li Sun could not have been involved. As a result, Li Sun was allowed to retire and was spared his life. It was said that at that time, Tian dominated the court scene, and that Xiao was the only one who dared to disagree with him on policy matters, and so the other imperial officials relied on him.

=== During and after Li Yun's claim of imperial title ===
In 885, by which time Emperor Xizong and the imperial court had returned to Chang'an after Huang Chao's defeat, Tian, after getting into a confrontation with Wang Chongrong the military governor of Hezhong Circuit (河中, headquartered in modern Yuncheng, Shanxi), tried to transfer Wang. Wang reacted by preparing for war (along with his ally Li Keyong the military governor of Hedong Circuit (河東, headquartered in modern Taiyuan, Shanxi), against Tian and Tian's allies Zhu Mei the military governor of Jingnan Circuit (靜難, headquartered in modern Xianyang, Shaanxi) and Li Changfu the military governor of Fengxiang Circuit (鳳翔, headquartered in modern Baoji, Shaanxi). In late 885, Wang's and Li Keyong's forces defeated the Tian/Zhu/Li Changfu coalition, and approached Chang'an. Emperor Xizong fled first to Fengxiang, and then to Xingyuan (興元, headquartered in modern Hanzhong, Shaanxi).

While Emperor Xizong was still at Fengxiang, where the imperial officials had largely followed him, Xiao, apparently hoping to use Zhu to eliminate Tian's influence on Emperor Xizong, summoned Zhu and his army to Fengxiang. By the time that Zhu arrived, however, Emperor Xizong had already fled to Xingyuan, with the imperial officials largely remaining at Fengxiang—indeed, when Kong Wei tried to persuade Xiao and fellow chancellor Pei Che to head to Xingyuan as well, Xiao and Pei refused, in light of Tian's hold on the emperor. Zhu, who by this point was also disillusioned with Tian, decided that he would try to support a new emperor—and planned to make Emperor Xizong's distant relative Li Yun the Prince of Xiang the new emperor. He consulted Xiao, who opposed, blaming the errors of Emperor Xizong's administration on Tian. Zhu, however, forged ahead with his plans and forced the imperial officials at Fengxiang to declare Li Yun regent, in summer 886. When Zhu asked Xiao to draft the text of the declaration, however, Xiao declined, claiming that he was aged and no longer a good writer, so another imperial official, Zheng Changtu, authored it instead. Zhu then removed Xiao from his chancellor position, replacing him with Zheng, and instead gave Xiao the entirely honorary title of senior advisor to the Crown Prince. Xiao was then allowed to retire to Yongle (永樂, in modern Yuncheng), where Xiao Gou's brother Xiao Qu (蕭蘧) was serving as county magistrate. Soon thereafter, Zhu declared Li Yun emperor at Chang'an.

In winter 881, after Zhu's officer Wang Xingyu was unable to capture Xingyuan and seize Emperor Xizong as Zhu ordered, he turned against Zhu and killed Zhu in an ambush at Chang'an. Pei and Zheng escorted Li Yun to Yuncheng, hoping for support from Wang Chongrong, but Wang Chongrong, after initially feigning to welcome Li Yun, executed him and arrested Pei and Zheng, whom Emperor Xizong ordered in spring 882 to be executed. As Kong, who had been made chancellor by this point, had resented Xiao, he claimed that Xiao had also supported Li Yun. Thus, Xiao was also ordered to commit suicide at Yongle.

== Notes and references ==
- Old Book of Tang, vol. 179.
- New Book of Tang, vol. 101.
- Zizhi Tongjian, vols. 252, 254, 255, 256.
