= Zheng Changtu =

Chinese chancellor

Zheng Changtu (鄭昌圖) (died April 6, 887?), courtesy name Guangye (光業), was an official of the Chinese Tang dynasty. He served as a chancellor in the administration of the pretender Li Yun, who claimed the throne in competition with Emperor Xizong. After the deaths of Li Yun and Li Yun's main proponent, Zhu Mei, Zheng was executed for his service under Li Yun.

== Background ==
It is not known when Zheng Changtu was born. His family claimed ancestry from the ruling house of the Spring and Autumn period state Zheng, and a number of chancellors came from the line, including his granduncle Zheng Yuqing and Zheng Yuqing's grandson (Zheng Changtu's second cousin) Zheng Congdang. Zheng Changtu's grandfather Zheng Juzhan (鄭具瞻) served as a county sheriff, while his father Zheng Juan (鄭涓) served as the military governor (jiedushi) of Hedong Circuit (河東, headquartered in modern Taiyuan, Shanxi).

== Known service during Emperor Xizong's reign ==
As of spring 882, Zheng Changtu was serving as Zhongshu Sheren (中書舍人), a mid-level official at the legislative bureau of government (中書省, Zhongshu Sheng), in the administration of Emperor Xizong, who had fled to Chengdu from the capital Chang'an in light of the attack that the major agrarian rebel Huang Chao launched on Chang'an late in 880. (After Huang took Chang'an, he declared himself emperor of a new state of Qi.) In spring 882, when the senior chancellor Wang Duo was put in overall command of the Tang operations against Huang, Wang retained a large number of imperial officials to serve on his staff, including Zheng, who was made Wang's chief of staff in Wang's capacity as the military governor of Yicheng Circuit (義成, headquartered in modern Anyang, Henan).

As of late 882, Zhaoyi Circuit (昭義, headquartered in modern Changzhi, Shanxi) had been going through much turmoil — as the officer Cheng Lin (成麟) had killed the military governor Gao Xun (高潯) in a mutiny in 881 and was in turn killed by another officer, Meng Fangli. The people of Zhaoyi then asked the eunuch monitor Wu Quanxu (吳全勗) to act as military governor, but Meng rejected this (claiming that a eunuch should not be a governor) and put Wu under house arrest, instead claiming that he wanted the imperial government to send a replacement. Wang sent Zheng to temporarily act as military governor. The imperial government then commissioned Wang Hui to serve as Zhaoyi's military governor. Wang, however, knowing that Meng had full control of three of Zhaoyi's five prefectures (i.e., the ones east of the Taihang Mountains), believed that he would not be actually able to exercise control, and so declined the commission. The circuit was then instead given to Zheng, although Zheng left his post just three months later, leaving Meng in control.

== Participation in Li Yun's administration ==
In 885, by which time Huang Chao had been defeated and Emperor Xizong had returned to Chang'an, the powerful eunuch Tian Lingzi, who dominated Emperor Xizong's administration, offended the warlord Wang Chongrong the military governor of Hezhong Circuit (河中, headquartered in modern Yuncheng, Shanxi) and then tried to transfer Wang. Wang resisted, and he and his ally Li Keyong the military governor of Hedong Circuit (河東, headquartered in modern Taiyuan, Shanxi) subsequently defeated the armies of Tian and Tian's allies Zhu Mei the military governor of Jingnan Circuit (靜難, headquartered in modern Xianyang, Shaanxi) and Li Changfu the military governor of Fengxiang Circuit (鳳翔, headquartered in modern Baoji, Shaanxi) and approached Chang'an. Tian took Emperor Xizong and initially fled to Fengxiang, and then to Xingyuan (興元, in modern Hanzhong, Shaanxi).

Most imperial officials, including the chancellors Xiao Gou and Pei Che, followed Emperor Xizong to Fengxiang, but, disillusioned with the influence that Tian had on him, did not follow him to Xingyuan. Zhu was also disillusioned with Emperor Xizong, and resolved to support Emperor Xizong's distant relative Li Yun the Prince of Xiang as the new emperor. He first forced the imperial officials at Fengxiang to support Li Yun as regent, and he tried to get Xiao to write the text of the petition of support. When Xiao declined (claiming that his writing abilities had deteriorated), Zheng Changtu, who was then the deputy minister of defense (兵部侍郎, Bingbu Shilang) and the director of taxation, did so. Subsequently, after the imperial officials escorted Li Yun back to Chang'an, claiming regent authorities, made Zheng chancellor de facto with the designation Tong Zhongshu Menxia Pingzhangshi (同中書門下平章事).

== Death ==
Zhu Mei sent his officer Wang Xingyu to try to capture Xingyuan and seize Emperor Xizong. However, Wang Xingyu was unable to advance against Emperor Xizong's forces and feared that Zhu would punish him. Further, he was enticed by the declaration issued by the eunuch Yang Fugong, who had succeeded Tian as the commander of the Shence Armies (神策軍) by this point, that anyone who killed Zhu would be given Jingnan Circuit. He therefore made a surprise return to Chang'an and ambushed and killed Zhu. The city was thrown into disarray. Pei Che and Zheng Changtu, along with 200 imperial officials, escorted Li Yun and fled to Hezhong. Wang Chongrong initially feigned to welcome Li Yun, but then seized and killed him. He put Pei and Zheng under arrest.

In early 887, Wang Chongrong prepared to deliver Pei and Zheng to Emperor Xizong. Emperor Xizong, however, issued an edict that they should be put to death wherever the edict was received, and so they were executed at Qishan (岐山, in modern Baoji).

== Notes and references ==
- Zizhi Tongjian, vols. 254, 255, 256.
