= Meng Fangli =

Meng Fangli (Chinese: 孟方立; died July 2, 889) was a warlord in the late Chinese Tang dynasty who, from 881 to 889, controlled all or part of Zhaoyi Circuit (昭義)—the headquarters of which he moved from Lu Prefecture (潞州, in modern Changzhi, Shanxi) to his home Xing Prefecture (邢州, in modern Xingtai, Hebei)—as its military governor (jiedushi). His move of the headquarters drew resentment from the people of Lu Prefecture, who threw their support behind Li Keyong the military governor of neighboring Hedong Circuit (河東, headquartered in modern Taiyuan, Shanxi), whose forces eventually defeated his. Fearful that his subordinates were turning against him, he committed suicide.

== Background and seizure of Zhaoyi Circuit ==
It is not known when Meng Fangli was born, but it is known that he was from Xing Prefecture. As of 881, he was serving as the defender of Tianjing Pass (天井關, in modern Jincheng, Shanxi). That year, while the Gao Xun (高潯) the military governor of Zhaoyi Circuit was leading his army as part of the Tang campaign to recapture the imperial capital Chang'an—which had fallen months earlier to the major agrarian rebel Huang Chao, forcing then-reigning Emperor Xizong to flee to Chengdu—Gao was assassinated by the officer Cheng Lin (成麟), who took over the army and returned to Lu Prefecture. Meng, hearing the news, launched an attack against the mutineers and killed Cheng.

After Meng killed Cheng, however, he did not remain at Lu Prefecture, and instead took his army and returned to his home Xing Prefecture. The people of Lu supported the eunuch Wu Quanxu (吳全勗) to serve as acting military governor. Meanwhile, in 882, the overall commander against Huang, the former chancellor Wang Duo, issued an edict in Emperor Xizong's name making Meng the prefect of Xing. Meng refused to accept the commission, and further put Wu under arrest, claiming that a eunuch could not be an acting military governor. He wrote Wang, requesting that a civilian official be made the military governor. Wang made the official Zheng Changtu acting military governor. Subsequently, Emperor Xizong commissioned Wang Hui to be the new military governor, but Wang Hui, not wanting to travel far to his post and knowing that Meng had control of the three Zhaoyi prefectures east of the Taihang Mountains (Xing, Ming (洺州, in modern Handan, Hebei), and Ci (磁州, also in modern Handan)) anyway, declined to report to Zhaoyi, and instead recommended Zheng. Emperor Xizong agreed, making him instead the director of Chang'an's reconstruction. Zheng reported to Lu, but left after less than three months, leaving Meng in effective control of the circuit.

== Movement of headquarters to Xing and subsequent warfare ==
Meng Fangli thereafter moved the circuit headquarters from Lu Prefecture to Xing Prefecture and claimed the title of acting military governor. He made his officer Li Yinrui (李殷銳) the prefect of Lu. (He was apparently then made military governor, as he was later referred to by that title.) Further, to weaken the power of Lu, as he believed that the people of Lu had a history of overthrowing the military governor, he forced the officers and the wealthy to move their families to the three prefectures east of the Taihang. Knowing that the people of Lu were distressed about these acts, the eunuch monitor Qi Shenhui (祁審誨) had the officer An Jushou (安居受) secretly write Li Keyong the military governor of Hedong Circuit, who had a powerful army, to ask for his intervention. In response, in winter 883, Li Keyong sent his officer He Gongya (賀公雅) to attack Meng, but Meng defeated He Gongya. Li Keyong then sent his cousin Li Kexiu (李克脩), who was able to capture Lu and kill Li Yinrui, taking it over. This started years of warfare between Li Keyong and Meng over the control of Zhaoyi, laying waste to the circuit. In fall 884, at Li Keyong's request, Emperor Xizong named Li Kexiu the military governor of Zhaoyi, thus leaving Zhaoyi with two contending military governors.

Meanwhile, because of a dispute between Meng's subordinates Ma Shuang (馬爽) the prefect of Ming and Xi Zhongxin (奚忠信) the commander of the Zhaoyi forces, Ma rebelled in summer 885 to try to force Meng to kill Xi. However, Ma was soon defeated, and fled to neighboring Weibo Circuit (魏博, headquartered in modern Handan). Meng then sent a gift to Weibo's military governor Le Yanzhen and persuaded Le to kill Ma.

In fall 886, Li Kexiu launched a major attack against Meng, capturing a number of cities east of the Taihang and commissioning his officer An Jinjun (安金俊) as the prefect of Xing. In 888, Meng tried to counterattack by having Xi attack Hedong's Liao Prefecture (遼州, in modern Jinzhong, Shanxi). Li Kexiu defeated and captured Xi, delivering him to Li Keyong.

== Defeat and death ==
In summer 889, Li Keyong launched a major attack against Meng Fangli, sending Li Hanzhi and Li Cunxiao against him. Li Keyong's forces soon captured Ming and Ci Prefectures. Meng sent the officers Ma Gai (馬溉) and Yuan Fengtao (袁奉韜) to resist, but Meng's forces were defeated at Liuli Slope (琉璃陂, in modern Xingtai), with Ma and Yuan captured. Li Keyong then put Xing Prefecture under siege. As Meng was suspicious of the officers, the officers resented him, and they were no longer obeying him by this point. In distress, he committed suicide. The soldiers supported his brother or cousin Meng Qian (孟遷) as the acting military governor, but Meng Qian, after some resistance, surrendered, leaving Li Keyong in control of a reunified Zhaoyi Circuit.

== Notes and references ==
- New Book of Tang, vol. 187.
- Zizhi Tongjian, vols. 254, 255, 256, 257, 258.
