= Wang Chucun =

Chinese general

- Traditional Chinese: 王處存
- Simplified Chinese: 王处存
Transcriptions
Standard Mandarin
- Hanyu Pinyin: Wáng Chùcún
- Wade–Giles: Wang Ch'u-ts'un

Posthumous name Wang Zhongsu
- Traditional Chinese: 王忠肅
- Simplified Chinese: 王忠肃
- Literal meaning: Faithful & Solemn Wang
Transcriptions
Standard Mandarin
- Hanyu Pinyin: Wáng Zhōngsù
- Wade–Giles: Wang Chung-su

Wang Chucun (831–895) was a Chinese general of the Tang Empire who served as the largely independent military governor (jiedushi) of Yiwu in modern Baoding, Hebei. He was one of the main contributors to Tang's eventual defeat of the agrarian rebel Huang Chao.

== Life ==
=== Early years ===
Wang Chucun was born in 831 during the reign of the Tang emperor Wenzong. His family was from the capital Chang'an (now Xi'an in Shaanxi), and his ancestors had served as officers in the imperial Shence Armies for generations. His father Wang Zong (王宗, Wáng Zōng) was not only a highly ranked general in the Shence Armies but also a skillful merchant. It was said that he became so rich that he was able to be extravagant in his food and to have thousands of servants. Wang Chucun himself started his career as the commander at a Shence Army base, and he later became a general and a patrol commander.

Wang Chucun was first made the overseer (制置使, zizhishi) of the army at Dingzhou, the capital of Yiwu, and then named the area's military governor (jiedushi) in 879.

=== Huang Chao Rebellion ===
Around the new year of 881, the major agrarian rebel Huang Chao captured Chang'an, forcing the reigning emperor Xizong to flee south to Chengdu. Huang declared himself the emperor of a new state of Qi. Wang Chucun, upon hearing the news of Chang'an's fall, decided to head to Chang'an to aid the imperial cause even before Emperor Xizong sent any orders, and he also sent 2000 men to Xingyuan (興元) in modern Hanzhong, Shaanxi, to protect the emperor as he was en route to Chengdu. Wang Chucun entered into an alliance with Wang Chongrong, the military governor of Hezhong (河中) in modern Yuncheng, Shanxi, who had briefly submitted to Huang's Qi state but then reverted to Tang allegiance due to Huang's heavy tax and conscription burdens. They marched their armies toward Chang'an, camping on the opposite northern side of the Wei River.

By the summer of 881, several Tang generals had congregated near Chang'an, preparing to recapture it. These included, in addition to Wang Chucun and Wang Chongrong, Tang Hongfu (唐弘夫), Cheng Zongchu (程宗楚), Tuoba Sigong, and Zheng Tian. Huang, fearful of the Tang forces, abandoned Chang'an and fled. During their flight, the Chang'an residents tried to aid the Tang forces by throwing rocks and bricks at Qi forces. Wang Chucun, Cheng, and Tang entered the city to the celebration of the residents. However, instead of comforting the residents, the soldiers began pillaging the city and became bogged down with treasures they looted. The Qi forces, discovering this, counterattacked. In the subsequent street battles, the Tang forces were crushed. Cheng and Tang were killed, and Wang Chucun barely escaped. The Qi forces retook Chang'an and slaughtered the residents for their aiding of Tang forces during the battle. The Tang forces were subsequently unable to launch another attack to recapture Chang'an for some time. Meanwhile, the Shatuo chieftain Li Keyong, who had previously rebelled against Tang rule as well, was offering to again submit to the imperial government and aid in the operations against Huang but had also seized Xin (忻州) and Dai Prefectures (代州), both in modern Xinzhou, Shanxi, and had pillaged the surrounding regions. Wang Chucun's and Li Keyong's families had intermarried for generations and were friendly to each other, so Emperor Xizong had Wang Chucun write Li Keyong in fall 882, rebuking him for the pillaging and instructing him to await directions if he were truly interested in aiding the imperial government.

In 883, with Li Keyong near Chang'an, the Tang forces attacked it again, recapturing it for good. Huang fled east and would eventually be killed in 884. When the chancellor Wang Duo, who oversaw the operations against Huang, subsequently honored the generals with achievements during the campaign, Li Keyong was honored for his battlefield accomplishments while Wang Chucun was honored for his quick reaction and loyalty to the emperor.

=== Conflict with Wang Rong and Li Keju ===
To reward him for his achievements, Li Keyong was made the military governor of Hedong (河東) around Taiyuan, Shanxi. He subsequently used Hedong as his base to continually expand his power. Wang Chucun remained obedient to the imperial government, but was also allied with Li Keyong, taking a daughter of Li Keyong's to be the wife of his son Wang Ye (王鄴). Wang Chucun's neighboring military governors Wang Rong of Chengde (成德) around modern Shijiazhuang, Hebei, and Li Keju of Lulong (盧龍) around modern Beijing, however, feared Li Keyong's expansion and alliance with Wang Chucun. They therefore decided to destroy Wang Chucun and divide Yiwu among themselves. In the spring of 885, they launched the attack, and persuaded Helian Duo, military governor of Datong (大同) in modern Datong, Shanxi, to attack Li Keyong to stop him from coming to Wang Chucun's aid.

Helian's attack, however, did not stop Li Keyong from coming to Wang Chucun's aid and he repelled the Chengde attack. Li Keju's general Li Quanzhong captured Yi Prefecture in Yiwu but the army became arrogant and careless afterwards. Wang Chucun sent 3000 soldiers wearing sheepskin disguises and had them stand in fields by night. The Lulong soldiers thought that they were sheep and came out to pillage them. The soldiers then overwhelmed them, recapturing Yi Prefecture and forcing Li Quanzhong to flee. Li Quanzhong, fearing punishment from his master, subsequently mutinied and attacked Li Keju, forcing Li Keju to commit suicide. Li Quanzhong then took over as Lulong's military governor.

=== Wang Chongrong's disputes with the imperial court ===
Around the same time, though, Wang Chongrong and the powerful eunuch Tian Lingzi, who dominated Emperor Xizong's court (which had returned to Chang'an by this point), got into a major dispute over control of salt ponds in Hezhong. Tian tried to retaliate against Wang Chongrong by having Emperor Xizong issue an edict transferring Wang Chongrong to Taining (泰寧) in modern Jining, Shandong. Qi Kerang, then military governor of Taining, would be moved to Yiwu and Wang Chucun would be moved in turn to Hezhong. Wang Chucun submitted an objection, pointing out that the Lulong and Chengde attack had just recently been repelled and that he should not leave Yiwu at that time. He further defended Wang Chongrong, arguing that his fellow governor had performed great service for the throne against Huang and should not be transferred easily. Tian ignored Wang Chucun's objections and ordered him to report to Hezhong. Wang Chucun made a token attempt to do so, advancing to Jin Prefecture (晉州) in modern Linfen, Shanxi. However, after meeting resistance from Ji Junwu (冀君武), the Jin prefect and a subordinate of Wang Chongrong's, he simply returned to Yiwu. He appeared to make no subsequent attempt to help either side of the dispute when Wang Chongrong and Li Keyong subsequently engaged and defeated forces under Tian and his allies Zhu Mei, the military governor of Jingnan (靜難) around modern Xianyang, Shaanxi, and Li Changfu, the military governor of Fengxiang (鳳翔) around modern Baoji, Shaanxi. The battle caused Emperor Xizong to flee to Xingyuan, but there is no record that he was involved in Zhu's subsequent failed attempt to enthrone Li Yun, the prince of Xiang and a distant relative of the emperor Xizong.

=== Later years ===
In 892, Li Keyong and Wang Chucun attacked Wang Rong but were repelled.

Wang Chucun died in 895. The soldiers supported his son Wang Gao to succeed him as the military governor of Yiwu. The reigning Emperor Zhaozong—Emperor Xizong's brother—gave him the posthumous name Zhongsu ("Faithful and Solemn").
