= Pei Che =

- Died: April 6, 887
- Occupation: Chanellor

Pei Che (裴澈) (died April 6, 887), courtesy name Shenyuan (深源), was an official of the late Tang dynasty, serving as a chancellor during the reigns of Emperor Xizong and the pretender to the throne Li Yun. After Li Yun was defeated and executed, Pei was also executed for his service under Li Yun.

== Background ==
It is not known when Pei Che was born. He was from The Eastern Juan Pei of Pei clan of Hedong. His grandfather Pei Su (裴肅) served as a governor during the reign of Emperor Dezong, and his father Pei Qiu (裴俅), a younger brother of Pei Xiu, who served as a chancellor during the reign of Emperor Xuānzong, served as an advisory official. However, while Pei Qiu was referred to in Pei Xiu's biographies in the Old Book of Tang and the New Book of Tang, no reference was made to Pei Che, perhaps because of Pei Che's eventual end.

== Service under Emperor Xizong ==
In late 880, during the reign of Emperor Xuānzong's grandson Emperor Xizong, as the major agrarian rebel Huang Chao was on the cusp of reaching the imperial capital Chang'an, the leading chancellor Lu Xi was blamed for the imperial defeats by the powerful eunuch Tian Lingzi and removed from his post. (In response, Lu committed suicide.) Pei Che, who was then an imperial scholar (翰林學士, Hanlin Xueshi) and deputy minister of census (戶部侍郎, Hubu Shilang), was made a chancellor with the designation Tong Zhongshu Menxia Pingzhangshi (同中書門下平章事), along with Wang Hui. However, that same day, news arrived that Huang was about to attack Chang'an, and Tian took Emperor Xizong and fled toward Chengdu, where Tian's brother Chen Jingxuan served as military governor (Jiedushi) of Xichuan Circuit (西川, headquartered in modern Chengdu). Pei was initially unable to catch up with Emperor Xizong, but in spring 881 reached Chengdu as well. He served as chancellor in Emperor Xizong's administration until late 881, when he was made the governor (觀察使, Guanchashi) of Eyue Circuit (鄂岳, headquartered in modern Wuhan, Hubei), retaining the Tong Zhongshu Menxia Pingzhangshi title as an honorary title.

In 883, by which time Huang had been defeated and Chang'an recaptured by Tang forces, and Emperor Xizong was beginning to prepare to return, then-leading chancellor Zheng Tian had offended Tian Lingzi and Chen and was removed. Pei was recalled to serve as Zhongshu Shilang (中書侍郎), the deputy head of the legislative bureau of government (中書省, Zhongshu Sheng), and chancellor again with the designation Tong Zhongshu Menxia Pingzhangshi. He continued to serve as chancellor after Emperor Xizong's return to Chang'an. However, after Tian provoked the warlords Wang Chongrong the military governor of Hezhong Circuit (河中, headquartered in modern Yuncheng, Shanxi) and Li Keyong the military governor of Hedong Circuit (河東, headquartered in modern Taiyuan, Shanxi) into attacking Chang'an in late 885, Emperor Xizong fled Chang'an again, to Xingyuan (興元, in modern Hanzhong, Shaanxi). Because Tian was considered an overpowering and corrupting influence for Emperor Xizong, few imperial officials cared to follow Emperor Xizong on this flight, and neither Pei nor his chancellor colleague Xiao Gou did so.

== Service under Li Yun ==
Meanwhile, another warlord, Zhu Mei the military governor of Jingnan Circuit (靜難, headquartered in modern Xianyang, Shaanxi), who was initially allied with Tian but now turned against him as well, took over Chang'an and was poised to proclaim a distant relative of Emperor Xizong's, Li Yun the Prince of Xiang, emperor. As Zhu prepared to do so in summer 886, he gave himself the chancellor title of Shizhong (侍中) and made himself the director of the salt and iron monopolies, while making Pei the acting director of finances and Zheng Changtu the acting director of taxation. In winter 886, after Li Yun claimed imperial title, Pei and Zheng continued to serve as chancellors.

== Execution ==
Li Yun's claim, however, was short-lived, as Zhu's officer Wang Xingyu, who was given the task of attacking Xingyuan and capturing Emperor Xizong, was unable to do so, and feared punishment from Zhu. Further, Yang Fugong, who had by this point succeeded Tian Lingzi as the director of palace communications, issued a proclamation that anyone who killed Zhu would be made the military governor of Jingnan. Wang thus turned against Zhu and made a surprise return to Chang'an. When Zhu heard of this, he, not knowing Wang's intent to turn against him, summoned Wang and rebuked him for returning without orders. Instead, Wang seized and killed him, and Wang's soldiers subsequently pillaged the capital. Pei Che and Zheng Changtu, as well as some 200 officials, escorted Li Yun to Hezhong, hoping for protection from Wang Chongrong. Wang Chongrong, however, after initially feigning to welcome Li Yun, seized Li Yun and executed him. He also arrested Pei and Zheng.

In spring 887, Emperor Xizong issued an edict that Pei, Zheng, and Xiao Gou (who had also accepted a chancellor title from Li Yun but did not actively participate in the regime) be executed wherever they were at the time of the edict — and thus, all three were executed at Qishan (岐山, in modern Baoji, Shaanxi).

== Notes and references ==
- Zizhi Tongjian, vols. 254, 255, 256.
