= Qi Kerang =

Chinese general during Tang dynasty

- Traditional Chinese: 齊克讓
- Simplified Chinese: 齐克让
Transcriptions
Standard Mandarin
- Hanyu Pinyin: Qí Kèràng
- Wade–Giles: Ch'i K'o-jang

Qi Kerang (fl. 880s) was a Chinese general of the Tang Empire who served as the military governor (jiedushi) of Taining (泰寧) around modern Jining, Shandong. He failed to end the agrarian revolt of Huang Chao in the early 880s and was displaced in a surprise attack by Zhu Jin in 886.

== Life ==
=== Early life ===
Little is known about Qi Kerang's background, as he did not have a biography in either of the official histories of Tang dynasty, the Old Book of Tang and the New Book of Tang.

=== Huang Chao Rebellion ===
Qi was serving as the military governor (jiedushi) of Taining (泰寧) around modern Jining, Shandong, by 880, when the Tang emperor Xizong directed his eastern governors and commanders to block the northwestward advance of the agrarian rebel Huang Chao. Several governors were directed to station their men on the Yin River (溵水), a major branch of the Shaying River, while Qi was directed to station his men at Ruzhou (汝州) in modern Pingdingshan, Henan.

Huang arrived in the region in the fall of 880 with a force reckoned as 150,000 strong. He defeated the 6000 men under Cao Quanzhen (曹全晸), the military governor of Tianping (天平) around modern Tai'an, Shandong, by sheer numerical advantage. Around the same time, Xue Neng (薛能), the military governor of Zhongwu (忠武) around modern Xuchang, Henan, was killed in a mutiny led by Zhou Ji. Worried that Zhou would next ambush him, Qi abandoned his defensive position and returned to Taining's capital Yanzhou (兗州). Following his example, the other jiedushi also abandoned their own defensive positions along the Yin River, allowing Huang an open path toward the imperial capitals of Luoyang and Chang'an.

Qi then marched to protect Luoyang but, faced with Huang's growing strength, abandoned it to garrison the Tong Pass and block the Huang's path toward Chang'an. Qi still had more than 10,000 soldiers, but his troops lacked any food supply. Emperor Xizong ordered Zhang Chengfan (張承範), general of the imperial guard, to reinforce Qi with a few thousand more troops, but Zhang objected that neither his men nor Qi's had any rations. Emperor Xizong sent Zhang on his way anyway, claiming that supplies would follow, but none did.

Zhang's relief troops and Huang's vanguard arrived at Tong Pass on the same day, 4 January 881. Qi's troops and Huang's battled for most of the morning. Around noontime, Qi's troops began collapsing from hunger. They trampled through Jinkeng (禁坑), a valley full of thorns that was serving as part of the defensive perimeter for Tong Pass. With the thorns destroyed, the pass was vulnerable to attack from a new flank. Qi fled while Zhang continued to try to defend Tong Pass, but in the end it fell. Huang to continued on and captured Chang'an, while Emperor Xizong fled to Chengdu. From the official histories of the dynasty, Qi was apparently uninvolved with the ultimate Tang victory over Huang and the emperor's restoration to Chang'an.

=== Wang Chongrong's disputes with the imperial court ===
Despite his failure against Huang Chao, Qi apparently maintained his position in Taining. In 885, a major dispute occurred between the powerful eunuch Tian Lingzi and Wang Chongrong, the military governor of Hezhong (河中) around modern Yuncheng, Shanxi, largely concerning salt revenues. Tian attempted to order Wang Chongrong's transfer to Taining, moving Qi to Yiwu around modern Baoding in Hebei and moving Yiwu's military governor Wang Chucun to Hezhong. Wang Chucun complied with the order in a desultory fashion, allowing the first prefect he met in Chongrong's territory to turn him around, and defended Wang Chongrong in a memorial to the throne. Meanwhile, Wang Chongrong and his ally Keyong, the military governor of Hedong (河東) around modern Taiyuan, Shanxi, gathered their troops and defeated the combined forces of Tian and his allies Zhu Mei, the military governor of Jingnan (靜難) around Xianyang, Shaanxi, and Li Changfu, the military governor of Fengxiang (鳳翔) around modern Baoji, Shaanxi. What position Qi took during the affair is unclear: there is no record that he either refused to report to Yiwu or attempted to.

=== Overthrow ===
In 886, Zhu Jin, an officer at Tianping and the cousin of its military governor Zhu Xuan, asked to marry Qi's daughter. Qi agreed and Zhu Jin led a procession from Tianping's capital Yunzhou (鄆州) to Yanzhou. Having reached Yanzhou, on the day that he was supposed to receive his bride, he used his entourage and the weapons and armor hidden among his wagons to made a surprise attack, evicting Qi from the city. Zhu Jin took over Taining and was eventually formally commissioned as its new military governor. This is the last historical reference to Qi, and it is unknown what happened to him afterwards.
