= Li Changyan =

Warlord who controlled the Fengxiang Circuit

Li Changyan (李昌言) (d. 884) was a warlord of the late Chinese dynasty Tang dynasty, who controlled Fengxiang Circuit (鳳翔, headquartered in modern Baoji, Shaanxi) from 881 to 884 as its military governor (jiedushi) after overthrowing his predecessor, the former chancellor Zheng Tian.

== Takeover of Fengxiang Circuit ==
Little is known about Li Changyan's background, as neither of the official histories of the Tang dynasty (the Old Book of Tang and the New Book of Tang) contained a biography for him. It is known that as of 881, when Zheng Tian was serving as the military governor of Fengxiang and the overall commander against the major agrarian rebel Huang Chao—after Huang had captured the imperial capital Chang'an earlier that year and forced then-reigning Emperor Xizong to flee to Chengdu—Li Changyan was serving as the commander of the Fengxiang forces (行軍司馬, Xingjun Sima) and stationed at Xingping (興平, in modern Xianyang, Shaanxi). Due to the indecisive nature of the warfare with Huang, who declared himself emperor of a new state of Qi, the Fengxiang treasury was becoming drained, and Zheng was giving less rewards to the soldiers than the soldiers expected and cutting down on the salaries. Li Changyan, knowing that the soldiers were displeased, fanned their discontent. In winter 881, he took his soldiers from Xingyuan back to Fengxiang's capital Fengxiang Municipality and poised to attack. Zheng, not wanting to have his forces battle each other, transferred his powers to Li Changyan and headed toward Chengdu to join Emperor Xizong, but on the way also offered to resign. Emperor Xizong gave Zheng the post of advisor to the Crown Prince—a completely honorary post since there was no crown prince at the time—while making Li Changyan military governor.

== As military governor ==
It is unclear what role Li Changyan had in the campaign against Huang Chao. In 883, Emperor Xizong bestowed on him the honorary chancellor title of Tong Zhongshu Menxia Pingzhangshi (同中書門下平章事).

Later that year, after Huang had been defeated and Tang forces recaptured Chang'an, Emperor Xizong was beginning to prepare for a return to Chang'an. At that time, Zheng was again chancellor, but was in sharp disagreement in many matters with the powerful eunuch Tian Lingzi and Tian's brother Chen Jingxuan the military governor of Xichuan Circuit (西川, headquartered at Chengdu). In order to get Zheng to remove himself, Tian and Chen had Li Changyan submit a petition stating, "The soldiers are being troubled. When Zheng Tian follows Your Imperial Majesty back to the capital, he should not pass here." Zheng, seeing the nature of the threat, resigned.

In 884, Li Changyan became seriously ill. He commissioned his brother Li Changfu as acting military governor, and thereafter died. Emperor Xizong then commissioned Li Changfu as military governor.
