= Liu Hanhong =

Tang dynasty warlord

Liu Hanhong (劉漢宏) (died 887?) was a warlord of the Chinese dynasty Tang dynasty who initially was a rebel against Tang but later accepted Tang titles and controlled Yisheng Circuit (義勝, headquartered in modern Shaoxing, Zhejiang). Eventually, he was defeated and captured by Qian Liu, and delivered to Qian's superior Dong Chang and executed.

== Background and rebellion against Tang ==
It is not known when Liu Hanhong was born or his family background was, other than his family was from Yan Prefecture (兗州, in modern Jining, Shandong). In 879, he was serving at Jiangling under the chancellor Wang Duo, who was overseeing the operations against the major agrarian rebel Huang Chao when Wang, upon hearing of Huang's defeating of Wang's deputy Li Xi (李係) at Tan Prefecture (in modern Changsha, Hunan), became fearful, as at that time Wang had less than 10,000 men. He left Liu in charge of defending Jiangling and headed north himself, claiming to be rendezvousing Liu Jurong (劉巨容) the military governor (jiedushi) of Shannan East Circuit (山南東道, headquartered in modern Xiangyang, Hubei). As soon as Wang left Jiangling, however, Liu rebelled against the Tang imperial government and pillaged and burned Jiangling. Liu then took his troops north and became an anti-imperial government army. His army grew in force and, as of summer 880 was pillaging the region between Songzhou and Yan Prefectures. Then-reigning Emperor Xizong ordered the nearby circuits to launch troops to attack him, but was unable to effectuate much against him. He subsequently headed south and pillaged Shen (申州) and Guang (光州) (both in modern Xinyang, Henan) Prefectures. Later in the year, however, he offered to submit to the Tang imperial government, and Emperor Xizong made him the prefect of Su Prefecture (宿州, in modern Suzhou, Anhui).

== Takeover and rule of Zhedong/Yisheng ==
However, it was said that Liu Hanhong was displeased that the imperial government made him only a prefectural prefect. Therefore, in 880, with the imperial government set to punish Liu Tao (柳瑫) the governor (觀察使, Guanchashi) of Zhedong Circuit (浙東, headquartered in modern Shaoxing, Zhejiang) for unspecified offenses, the imperial government replaced Liu Tao with Liu Hanhong.

Once Liu Hanhong took over Zhedong, he had designs on seizing neighboring Zhexi Circuit (浙西, headquartered in modern Zhenjiang, Jiangsu, also known as Zhenhai Circuit (鎮海)) as well. In 882, he sent his brother Liu Hanyou (劉漢宥) and officer Xin Yue (辛約) with 20,000 and stationed them at Xiling (西陵, in modern Hangzhou, Zhejiang). Dong Chang the prefect of Hang Prefecture (杭州, in modern Hangzhou) sent his officer Qian Liu to resist Liu Hanyou and Xin. One foggy night, Qian took the opportunity to secretly cross the Qiantang River and attack the Zhedong camp, crushing the Zhedong army; Liu Hanyou and Xin fled. Later that year, Liu Hanhong made another attempt, sending his officer Wang Zhen (王鎮). Qian again made a surprise attack across the Qiantang against Wang and crushed him. Wang fled as well.

As of spring 883, Liu Hanhong placed his troops at three bases, Huangling (黃嶺), Yanxia (嚴下), and Zhennü (貞女, all in modern Hangzhou). Qian launched an attack from Fuchun (富春, in modern Hangzhou), capturing Huangling, as well as the defenders of Yanxia and Zhennü. He then defeated Liu Hanhong's elite troops, stationed at Zhuji (諸暨, in modern Shaoxing), and Liu Hanhong fled.

In winter 883, Liu Hanhong tried to again launch an attack against Dong through Xiling. Qian again crossed the Qiantang river and attacked and defeated him. The defeat was so crushing that Liu Hanhong had to flee by putting on the disguise of a fisherman, including carrying a fisherman's knife. However, he then regrouped and again battled Qian, but was again defeated, and his brother Liu Hanrong (劉漢容) and Xin were killed.

Meanwhile, throughout the years, Liu Hanhong had sent much tribute to Emperor Xizong, and Emperor Xizong, in late 883, promoted Zhedong Circuit with a new name of Yisheng (義勝), naming Liu Hanhong its military governor (jiedushi).

In spring 884, the agrarian rebel Wang Zhen (王鎮, unclear whether the same Wang Zhen that Liu Hanhong had sent against Dong in 882) captured Huang Jie (黃碣) the prefect of Wu Prefecture (婺州, in modern Jinhua, Zhejiang), and surrendered to Qian. Liu Hanhong sent his officer Lou Lai (婁賚) to attack and kill Wang, replacing him. Qian responded by joining his forces with those of Jiang Gui (蔣瓌); they attacked Lou and captured him.

== Defeat and death ==
In fall 886, Dong Chang offered to give Hang Prefecture to Qian Liu if Qian could capture Yisheng for him. Qian agreed, and pointed out that unless Liu Hanhong were destroyed, he would remain a danger for Hang Prefecture. Qiu thus took his army, cut through a mountainous route, and surprised the Yisheng troops by attacking them from the east. The Yisheng officer Bao Junfu (鮑君福) surrendered. Qian then engaged the rest of the Yisheng army and defeated them. He then captured Yisheng's capital Yue Prefecture (越州). Liu Hanhong fled to Tai Prefecture (台州, in modern Taizhou, Zhejiang). Qian executed Liu's mother and wife. Once Liu got to Tai Prefecture, the prefect of Tai, Du Xiong (杜雄), held a feast to welcome him and induced his troops to get drunk, and then captured him and delivered them to Dong, who executed him. Dong took over Yisheng Circuit, and yielded Hang Prefecture to Qian.

== Notes and references ==
- New Book of Tang, vol. 190.
- Zizhi Tongjian, vols. 253, 254, 255, 256.
