= Cui Hang =

Cui Hang (崔沆) (died January 24, 881), courtesy name Neirong (內融), was an official of the Chinese Tang dynasty, serving as a chancellor during the reign of Emperor Xizong. When the agrarian rebel Huang Chao captured the Tang capital Chang'an, Cui was unable to flee; he was then executed by Huang's new state of Qi.

== Background ==
It is not known when Cui Hang was born. He was from the "Elder Boling branch" of the Cui clan of Boling (博陵, in modern Hengshui, Hebei), and his father Cui Xuan served as a chancellor during the reigns of Emperor Wuzong and Emperor Wuzong's uncle Emperor Xuānzong. He had at least four younger brothers, Cui Ting (崔汀), Cui Tan (崔潭), Cui Yi (崔沂), and Cui Ji (崔濟).

== Career prior to chancellorship ==
At some point, Cui Hang passed the imperial examinations in the Jinshi class, although when he did so is not known. He subsequently became a low-level official (員外郎, Yuanwailang) in one of the ministries at the executive bureau of government (尚書省, Shangshu Sheng). Yet later, he was put in charge of drafting edicts and was made a Zhongshu Sheren (中書舍人), a mid-level official at the legislative bureau (中書省, Zhongshu Sheng).

In 872, during the reign of Emperor Yizong, the official Wei Yinyu (韋殷裕), whose wife was a cousin of Cui Hang's, submitted a report accusing Guo Jingshu (郭敬述), the brother of Emperor Yizong's favorite concubine Consort Guo, of improprieties. Emperor Yizong, in anger, caned Wei to death and confiscated his assets. Further, Wei's father-in-law (Cui Hang's uncle) Cui Yuanying (崔元應), Cui Hang, and a cousin of Cui Yuanying's, Cui Junqing (崔君卿) was exiled, as was Wei's friend Du Yixiu (杜裔休), a son of the deceased chancellor Du Cong. In Cui Hang's case, he was made the census officer at Xun Prefecture (循州, in modern Huizhou, Guangdong).

After Emperor Yizong died in 873 and was succeeded by his son Emperor Xizong, Cui Hang was moved closer to the capital, to be the prefect of Yong Prefecture (永州, in modern Yongzhou, Hunan). He was subsequently recalled to the capital Chang'an to again serve as Zhongshu Sheren, and then successively as the deputy minister of rites (禮部侍郎, Lǐbu Shilang) then deputy minister of civil service affairs (吏部侍郎, Lìbu Shilang, note different tone).

== Chancellorship ==
In 878, when Emperor Xizong decided to remove the chancellors Zheng Tian and Lu Xi over a violent argument that Zheng and Lu had with each other, both Cui Hang and Doulu Zhuan were made chancellors to succeed Zheng and Lu, with the designation Tong Zhongshu Menxia Pingzhangshi (同中書門下平章事). After Lu was restored to the chancellorship in 879, though, Lu was clearly the leader among the chancellors, and Doulu was described as simply following Lu's lead on policies. Further, when Cui would have policy suggestions, Doulu often stopped him from presenting them. There was one major policy decision that he prevailed on — when the warlord Wang Jingchong, who controlled Chengde Circuit (成德, headquartered in modern Shijiazhuang, Hubei), also sought to have the imperial government grant him Yiwu Circuit (義武, headquartered in modern Baoding, Hubei), Cui, pointing out that Chengde, in conjunction with other warlord-controlled circuits Weibo (魏博, headquartered in modern Handan, Hubei) and Lulong (盧龍, headquartered in modern Beijing), would be even harder to control, refused.

By late 880, the major agrarian rebel Huang Chao captured the eastern capital Luoyang and the capital Chang'an. Doulu and Cui suggested sending forces to defend Tong Pass to stop Huang's advance toward Chang'an, but both of them were also suggesting that the contingency plan made by the powerful eunuch Tian Lingzi — that Emperor Xizong flee to the Sanchuan region (三川, i.e., modern Sichuan, Chongqing, and southern Shaanxi) be implemented. After Huang captured Tong Pass and approached Chang'an, Emperor Xizong fled toward Xichuan Circuit (西川, headquartered in modern Chengdu, Sichuan), where Tian's brother Chen Jingxuan was military governor. Doulu and Cui, for reasons unknown, were unable to follow Emperor Xizong's flight, and they, along with the former chancellor Liu Ye, hid at the mansion of the general Zhang Zhifang, who had outwardly submitted to Huang (who declared himself the emperor of a new state of Qi) upon Huang's entry into Chang'an but was hiding many Tang officials at his mansion. As Qi forces sought to find hiding Tang officials, however, Liu, Doulu, and Cui tried to flee, but were captured. Refusing to submit to Huang, they were executed.

== Notes and references ==
- Old Book of Tang, vol. 163.
- New Book of Tang, vol. 160.
- Zizhi Tongjian, vols. 252, 253, 254.
