= Lu Xie =

Tang Dynasty official

Lu Xie (盧攜) (died January 8, 881), courtesy name Zisheng (子升), was a politician of the late Tang dynasty, serving twice as chancellor under Emperor Xizong. After advancing progressively through the civil bureaucracy, Lu aligned himself with the powerful palace eunuch Tian Lingzi and the influential military commander Gao Pian to become the imperial court's preeminent minister in the early years of Huang Chao's rebellion. Hampered by Gao Pian's unreliability in the field and by Lu's own declining health, the court proved unable to organize successful resistance to the rebel forces. As the rebel army advanced on the imperial capital of Chang'an, Lu was blamed for the disaster and deprived of his office. He committed suicide by poison in the hours before the city fell to the rebels.

== Background and early career ==
It is not known when Lu Xie was born. His family claimed to be originally from Fanyang, but had settled at Zheng Prefecture (鄭州, in modern Zhengzhou, Henan) by Lu Xi's time, and his family was not otherwise traceable to the bloodlines of the other chancellors named Lu. His grandfather Lu Sun (盧損) was not listed with any offices in the table of the chancellors' family trees in the New Book of Tang, and while his biography in the Old Book of Tang referred to his father Lu Qiu (盧求) as having passed the imperial examinations in the Jinshi class, having served on regional governor staffs, and having served as a prefectural prefect, the table of the chancellors' family trees did not mention any of the titles. However, given that Lu Xie's mother was a daughter of the official Li Ao (李翱), it would appear likely that his father was, in fact, an official.

Lu Xie himself passed the imperial examinations in the Jinshi class in 853, during the reign of Emperor Xuānzong. He thereafter was made an assistant scholar at the Jixian Institute (集賢院), and subsequently served on regional governors' staffs. In the middle of the Xiantong era (860-874) of Emperor Xuānzong's son Emperor Yizong, he was recalled to the capital Chang'an to serve as You Shiyi (右拾遺), a low-level advisory official at the legislative bureau of government (中書省, Zhongshu Sheng), and then an imperial censor with the title Dianzhong Shiyushi (殿中侍御史). He later went through positions at the executive bureau (尚書省, Shangshu Sheng), and then served as the magistrate of Chang'an County (i.e., one of the two counties making up Chang'an proper), then the prefect of Zheng Prefecture. He was later recalled to Chang'an to serve as a mid-level advisory official (諫議大夫, Jianyi Daifu). Early in the reign of Emperor Yizong's son Emperor Xizong, he was made an imperial scholar (翰林學士, Hanlin Xueshi) as well as Zhongshu Sheren (中書舍人), a mid-level official at the legislative bureau. He was subsequently made deputy minister of census (戶部侍郎, Hubu Shilang) as well as chief imperial scholar (翰林學士承旨, Hanlin Xueshi Chengzhi). In 874, he submitted a petition to Emperor Xizong that pointed out that the people throughout the empire were being overwhelmed by the tax burden, particularly in light of the drought-caused famine that was occurring in the central parts of the empire, and advocated waiving the taxes and further taking food out of the imperial storage for famine relief. Emperor Xizong praised him for the petition and ordered that it be implemented, but it was not actually implemented.

== First chancellorship ==
In winter 874, Lu Xie was given the designation Tong Zhongshu Menxia Pingzhangshi (同中書門下平章事), making him a chancellor de facto — at the same time that Zheng Tian, who was a cousin of his (as their mothers were sisters) was also made chancellor. However, despite this relationship, it was said that Lu and Zheng did not get along, and often argued about policy proposals. In 877, with the imperial armies deeply engaged in a campaign against the agrarian rebel Huang Chao, a dispute over whether the general Zhang Zimian (張自勉) should be under the command of the overall commander, Song Wei (宋威), boiled into a major dispute between Lu, Zheng, and their colleague Wang Duo — as Wang and Lu wanted to put Zhang under Song's command, but Zheng opposed, believing that the existing rivalry between Song and Zhang meant that Song would find excuses to have Zhang executed. Wang and Lu offered to resign, and Zheng offered to retire. Emperor Xizong did not approve any of these offers. After Wang was made the overall commander of the operations against Huang, Lu was also displeased at this development, and he opposed the subsequent proposal by the official Cui Qiu (崔璆) to pacify Huang by giving Huang the military governorship (Jiedushi) of Lingnan East Circuit (嶺南東道, headquartered in modern Guangzhou, Guangdong). Instead, Huang was only offered a low officer position, which angered Huang more, and there would be no peace talks thereafter.

In 878, Lu and Zheng had another major dispute — over whether an imperial princess should be offered in marriage to Dali's emperor Long Shun (隆舜) to settle the long-standing border troubles. Lu, supporting the proposal (which had been made by the general Gao Pian, the military governor of Xichuan Circuit (西川, headquartered in modern Chengdu, Sichuan), with whom Lu enjoyed a friendly relationship), and Zheng, opposing the proposal, argued so vehemently that Lu threw an inkstone on the ground, breaking it. When Emperor Xizong heard about this, he commented, "When the great officials curse each other like this, how can they govern the other officials?" As a result, both Zheng and Lu were removed from their chancellor posts and given the entirely-honorary titles as advisors to the Crown Prince (there being no crown prince at the time), and they were both further sent to the eastern capital Luoyang. They were replaced with Doulu Zhuan and Cui Hang.

== Between chancellorships ==
Lu Xie was soon recalled to the imperial government to serve as minister of defense (兵部尚書, Bingbu Shangshu). By late 879, Gao Pian, who was then the military Huainan Circuit (淮南, headquartered in modern Yangzhou, Jiangsu), had sent his officer Zhang Lin (張璘) to attack Huang and was having repeated victories. As a result, Lu, who had previously recommended Gao to be the overall commander of the operations against Huang, was in imperial favor again. He was thus made Menxia Shilang (門下侍郎), the deputy head of the examination bureau (門下省, Menxia Sheng), and chancellor again with the designation Tong Zhongshu Menxia Pingzhangshi.

== Second chancellorship ==
Lu Xie replaced many generals that Wang Duo (who had been removed after his own defeat in the campaign against Huang Chao in 879) and Zheng Tian had placed in various circuits against Huang. Under his advice, Emperor Xizong also made Gao Pian the overall commander of the operations against Huang. Gao gathered 70,000 soldiers, and at that time, the imperial government was confident that Gao could suppress Huang's rebellion, although some imperial officials had their reservations. Lu, having good relations with Gao and the powerful eunuch Tian Lingzi, was thus able to control the imperial governance.

In summer 880, Lu suffered a stroke and became unable to walk. He subsequently recovered slightly such that he could meet with Emperor Xizong with some physical assistance, and Emperor Xizong ordered that he be exempted from bowing to the emperor. Despite his illness, because of Lu's relationships with Tian and Gao, he continued to be the lead figure at court. However, as the illness rendered him unable to concentrate on matters of state, his assistants Yang Wen (楊溫) and Li Xiu (李修) made many decisions on his behalf, and Yang and Li Xiu publicly received bribes. Of the other chancellors, Doulu Zhuan had no real talents, so he followed whatever Lu decided. When Cui Hang had suggestions for the emperor, he was often dissuaded from making them by Doulu. Meanwhile, while Emperor Xizong continued to be not fully interested in an imperial marriage with Dali, under Lu's and Doulu's suggestion, he still sent the imperial prince Li Guinian (李龜年) the Prince of Cao and the official Xu Yunqian (徐雲虔) as emissaries to Dali to continue negotiations, to hold off potential Dali attacks.

However, at this time, news arrived that in a major battle, Huang defeated and killed Zhang. Gao, fearful of Huang after Zhang's death, was unwilling to engage Huang, and in fact sent the imperial government urgent calls for help as Huang advanced north, across the Yangtze River, approaching his headquarters at Yang Prefecture (揚州). When Emperor Xizong rebuked Gao for having previously sent back reinforcements that other circuits had sent, Gao sent an irreverent response that satirized Emperor Xizong, and refused to follow further imperial orders to engage Huang. Huang was thus free to advance north, toward Luoyang and Chang'an. Lu, hearing repeated bad news, did not know how to react, and could only use his illness as his excuse to remain at home. When Huang captured Tong Pass around new year 881 and approached Chang'an, Tian, who was then planning an evacuation to Xichuan Circuit (where his brother Chen Jingxuan had been installed as military governor) with Emperor Xizong, blamed Lu for the disaster and had Lu again made an advisor to the Crown Prince; Wang Hui and Pei Che replaced him. That night, Lu committed suicide by poison. Once Emperor Xizong fled and Huang captured Chang'an, he had Lu's body exhumed and cut into pieces publicly.

== Notes and references ==
Notes

Bibliography

- Old Book of Tang, vol. 178.
- New Book of Tang, vol. 184.
- Zizhi Tongjian, vols. 252, 253, 254.
