= Wang Chongrong =

Warlord in the later years of Chinese Tang dynasty

Wang Chongrong (王重榮; died July 6, 887), formally the Prince of Langye (瑯琊王), was a warlord of the late Chinese Tang dynasty who controlled Hezhong Circuit (河中, headquartered in modern Yuncheng, Shanxi). He was instrumental in Tang's eventual defeat of the agrarian rebel Huang Chao, but at times had an adversarial relationship with the court of Emperor Xizong and the powerful eunuch Tian Lingzi.

== Background ==
It is not known when Wang Chongrong was born, and the official histories differ as to where his family was from—according to the Old Book of Tang, Hezhong Municipality (河中, in modern Yuncheng, Shanxi), and according to the New Book of Tang, Taiyuan Municipality. His father Wang Zong (王縱) was a successful military officer who reached the position of prefect of Yan Prefecture (鹽州, in modern Yulin, Shaanxi). Because of his father's contributions, both Wang Chongrong and his older brother Wang Chongying served in the military as well, and both were known for their fierce fighting ability. Wang Chongrong had at least one other older brother, Wang Chongjian (王重簡).

== Rise to power and campaign against Huang Chao ==
In 880, Wang Chongrong, who was then serving as a commander of the infantry at Hezhong Circuit, came to control Hezhong Circuit—but how he did so was disputed among the main traditional historical sources. According to the Old Book of Tang, when the major agrarian rebel Huang Chao captured the Tang imperial capital Chang'an, establishing his own state of Qi as its emperor and forcing the then-reigning Tang Emperor Xizong to flee to Chengdu, the military governor of Hezhong, Li Du (李都), believing that he could not resist Huang, submitted to Huang, and was allowed to remain at Hezhong, while Wang was commissioned deputy military governor by Huang. Wang, however, objected to the numerous demands for material supplies from Huang, and forced Li Du to yield power to him; Wang then claimed the position of acting military governor, killed the Qi emissaries, and sent Li Du on his way to Chengdu to pay homage to Emperor Xizong. The New Book of Tang gave a largely similar account, but further indicated that Emperor Xizong then sent the official Dou Jue (竇潏) to replace Li Du, and Wang forced Dou to return to Emperor Xizong and seized control of the circuit. The Zizhi Tongjian indicated that Wang had started a disturbance before Huang captured Chang'an, forcing Emperor Xizong to recall Li Du and commission him as acting military governor; that Wang subsequently submitted to Huang but then relented when faced with numerous material demands from Huang and returned to the Tang fold.

In any case, after Wang finally turned against Huang, Huang sent his general Zhu Wen and his brother Huang Ye (黃鄴) to attack Hezhong. Wang defeated them, and then entered into an alliance with Wang Chucun the military governor of Yiwu Circuit (義武, headquartered in modern Baoding, Hebei), who had approached the region intending to attack Huang Chao. They both advanced to the region north of the Wei River, preparing for an operation to recapture Chang'an for Tang. The joint Tang forces, which also included forces commanded by Zheng Tian, Tang Hongfu (唐弘夫), and Tuoba Sigong, briefly recaptured Chang'an in the summer of 881, but after the soldiers got bogged down inside the city pillaging the people, Qi forces counterattacked, dealing Tang forces serious defeats and recapturing Chang'an. Meanwhile, during the campaign, Emperor Xizong commissioned Wang Chongrong military governor of Hezhong. Thereafter, he, joined by Gao Xun (高潯) the military governor of Zhaoyi Circuit (昭義, headquartered in modern Changzhi, Shanxi), captured Hua Prefecture (華州, in modern Weinan, Shaanxi) for Tang. In the spring of 882, Zhu captured Tong Prefecture (同州, in modern Weinan) and then attacked Hezhong, but Wang Chongrong was able to repel him.

Unable to defeat Wang Chongrong, Zhu repeatedly sought reinforcements from Huang, but Huang's assistant Meng Kai (孟楷) repeatedly suppressed his reports and did not report them to Huang. In the fall of 882, believing that Qi would eventually fall, Zhu submitted to Wang Chongrong and, as Zhu's mother was named Wang as well, he honored Wang as a maternal uncle. Under Wang's recommendation, the former Tang chancellor Wang Duo, who was then in charge of the overall operations against Huang, commissioned Zhu as the military governor of Tonghua Circuit (同華, headquartered at Tong Prefecture) and gave him a new name of Quanzhong.

However, at that time, the Tang forces were stuck in a stalemate with Huang, and they continued to fear his military strength. After Wang Chongrong consulted with the eunuch general Yang Fuguang, Wang Duo, and Wang Hui), Yang suggested pardoning the Shatuo rebel general Li Keyong and requesting that Li Keyong join the battle. After Wang Duo sent an order to Li Keyong summoning him, Li Keyong agreed, and soon arrived in the region to join the campaign. Meanwhile, late in 882, Emperor Xizong bestowed on Wang Chongrong the honorary chancellor title of Tong Zhongshu Menxia Pingzhangshi (同中書門下平章事).

In 883, Li Keyong and Wang Chongrong joined their forces and advanced toward Chang'an, repeatedly defeating Qi forces. Li Keyong soon entered Chang'an, forcing Huang to flee east. For Wang Chongrong's contributions during the campaign, he was given the title of acting Taiwei (太尉, one of the Three Excellencies) and created the Prince of Langye.

== Confrontation with Tian Lingzi ==
After Emperor Xizong returned to Chang'an in 885, however, a dispute between Wang Chongrong and the powerful eunuch Tian Lingzi, who controlled Emperor Xizong's court, broke out. The imperial treasury had become very drained after Emperor Xizong's return to Chang'an, as most military governors throughout the empire were by that point withholding revenues that their circuits had previously submitted to the imperial government. Wang Chongrong himself had previously seized control of two salt ponds in Hezhong Circuit, which had previously under the imperial director of salt and iron monopolies, submitting only a small amount of the salt to the imperial government. Tian Lingzi requested that Emperor Xizong restore the control of the ponds to the control by the director of the salt and iron monopolies, and further put himself in charge of the two ponds. Wang objected and submitted repeated petitions requesting that he be allowed to continue to control the two ponds, to no avail. Further, when Tian's adopted son Tian Kuangyou (田匡祐) served as an emissary to Hezhong, Wang initially welcomed him warmly, but Tian Kuangyou offended the Hezhong soldiers with his arrogance. Wang then turned against him, arrested him, and declared Tian Lingzi's crimes in his presence. The eunuch monitors of Hezhong pleaded for Tian Kuangyou, and Wang released him. When Tian Kuangyou returned to Chang'an, he suggested that Tian Lingzi take action against Wang. In summer 885, Tian Lingzi thus had Emperor Xizong issue an edict transferring Wang Chongrong to Taining Circuit (泰寧, in modern Jining, Shandong), Qi Kerang the military governor of Taining to Yiwu Circuit, and Wang Chucun from Yiwu to Hezhong.

Wang Chongrong refused to follow the order and submitted an accusation against Tian Lingzi. Wang Chucun also submitted a petition on his behalf, and, when the order was not rescinded, made only a token attempt to head to Hezhong before returning to Yiwu. Tian aligned with Zhu Mei the military governor of Jingnan Circuit (靜難, headquartered in modern Xianyang, Shaanxi) and Li Changfu the military governor of Fengxiang Circuit (鳳翔, headquartered in modern Baoji, Shaanxi), while Wang Chongrong sought aid from Li Keyong. Around the new year 886, the armies engaged in battle, and Wang Chongrong's and Li Keyong's forces defeated those of Tian and his allies. Li Keyong approached Chang'an, and Tian took Emperor Xizong and fled to Xingyuan (興元, in modern Hanzhong, Shaanxi). Li Keyong and Wang Chongrong withdrew their forces to Hezhong and submitted petitions demanding Tian's death. When Emperor Xizong subsequently ordered Wang Chongrong to supply the imperial army with food, Wang responded that he would refuse the order unless Tian were executed. Meanwhile, Zhu took the opportunity to turn against Emperor Xizong, declaring Emperor Xizong's distant relative Li Yun the Prince of Xiang the new emperor at Chang'an.

== Reconciliation with Emperor Xizong ==
Meanwhile, by this point, Tian Lingzi, knowing that the entire empire hated him, had resigned and gone to Xichuan Circuit (西川, headquartered in modern Chengdu), where his brother Chen Jingxuan was military governor. Tian was succeeded as the commander of the imperial Shence Armies (神策軍) by Yang Fuguang's brother Yang Fugong. At the suggestion of the chancellor Du Rangneng, who pointed out that Wang Chongrong and Yang Fuguang (who had died by that point) were friendly to each other, Emperor Xizong had Yang Fugong write Wang Chongrong to persuade him to return to allegiance to Emperor Xizong. Upon receiving Yang Fugong's letter, Wang redeclared his loyalty to Emperor Xizong, submitted a tribute of silk, and further offered to attack Zhu Mei for Emperor Xizong. Li Keyong also redeclared his loyalty to Emperor Xizong as well.

Around the new year 887, Zhu's officer Wang Xingyu, who had been sent by Zhu to try to capture Emperor Xizong but who had been able to make no headway toward Xingyuan, was fearful of Zhu's punishment and was enticed by Yang Fugong's declaration that whoever killed Zhu would be given Jingnan Circuit. He returned to Chang'an and killed Zhu in a surprise attack. Li Yun's chancellors Pei Che and Zheng Changtu, along with some 200 imperial officials, took Li Yun and fled to Hezhong. Wang Chongrong initially pretended to welcome them, and then arrested and executed Li Yun and imprisoned Pei and Zheng (who were later also executed at Emperor Xizong's order). He sent Li Yun's head to Emperor Xizong at Xingyuan. Emperor Xizong then returned to Chang'an.

== Death ==
It was said, however, that late in his career, Wang Chongrong, whose rule of Hezhong was harsh, grew even harsher. He had once punished the officer Chang Xingru (常行儒), and Chang felt ashamed and decided to turn against him. In summer 887, Chang started a mutiny at night and attacked the headquarters. Wang Chongrong fled to his vacation home outside the city, but Chang tracked him down there and killed him. Chang supported Wang Chongrong's brother Wang Chongying, who was then the military governor of nearby Shan'guo Circuit (陝虢, headquartered in modern Sanmenxia, Henan) to replace Wang Chongrong, and Emperor Xizong issued an edict transferring Wang Chongying to Hezhong, while leaving Wang Chongying's son Wang Gong in charge at Shan'guo as acting military governor. After Wang Chongying took control of Hezhong, he put Chang to death. Wang Chongrong's adoptive son Wang Ke (son of Wang Chongrong's brother Wang Chongjian, so biological nephew) would eventually succeed Wang Chongying after Wang Chongying's death in 895, but Hezhong would eventually be conquered by Zhu Quanzhong in 901.

== Notes and references ==
- Old Book of Tang, vol. 182.
- New Book of Tang, vol. 187.
- Zizhi Tongjian, vols. 254, 255, 256, 257.
