= Li Yun (Tang dynasty) =

Emperor of Tang Dynasty
- Reign: 886–887
- Predecessor: Emperor Xizong
- Successor: Emperor Xizong
- Died: 887
Full name
- Family name: Lǐ (李); Given name: Yūn (熅)
Era name and dates
- Jiànzhēn (建貞): 886–887
- Dynasty: Tang dynasty

Li Yun (李熅) (died 887), imperial princely title Prince of Xiang (襄王), was a pretender to the throne of the Tang dynasty, who briefly, under the support of the warlord Zhu Mei, claimed the Tang imperial throne for two months in 886–887 at the capital Chang'an, in competition with Emperor Xizong.

Li Yun's brief reign ended when Zhu's subordinate Wang Xingyu rebelled and killed Zhu. Li Yun fled to the domain of the warlord Wang Chongrong, but then Wang executed Li and presented his head to Emperor Xizong.

== Background ==
It is not known when Li Yun was born. He was a great-grandson of Li Guang (李僙) the Prince of Xiang, who was a son of Emperor Suzong, and his grandfather Li Xuan (李宣), at one point, was created the Prince of Yiwu.

In 885, during the reign of Emperor Xizong, the powerful eunuch Tian Lingzi came under dispute with the military governor (Jiedushi) of Hezhong Circuit (河中, headquartered in modern Yuncheng, Shanxi), Wang Chongrong, over Tian's attempts to take back control of the salt ponds in Hezhong Circuit for the imperial government, as well as the rudeness that Tian's adoptive son Tian Kuangyou (田匡祐) displayed when being sent as an emissary to Hezhong. Tian Lingzi had Emperor Xizong issue an edict transferring Wang to Taining Circuit (泰寧, headquartered in modern Jining, Shandong). In anger, Wang refused, and allied himself with the ethnic Shatuo military governor Li Keyong of Hedong Circuit (河東, headquartered in modern Taiyuan, Shanxi). Tian reacted by aligning himself with Zhu Mei the military governor of Jingnan Circuit (靜難, headquartered in modern Xianyang, Shaanxi) and Li Changfu the military governor of Fengxiang Circuit (鳳翔, headquartered in modern Baoji, Shaanxi). The imperial forces under Tian's control joined Zhu's and Li Changfu's troops in attacking Wang; Wang and Li Keyong fought back and, in a battle around the new year 886, defeated the Tian/Zhu/Li Changfu coalition forces. With Li Keyong's and Wang's forces approaching the capital Chang'an, Emperor Xizong and Tian initially fled to Li Changfu's headquarters Fengxiang, and then to Xingyuan (興元, in modern Hanzhong, Shaanxi). Meanwhile, Zhu and Li Changfu, fearing Li Keyong and Wang, also turned against Tian and Emperor Xizong, sending forces to try to seize Emperor Xizong, but were unable to.

When Emperor Xizong fled Chang'an, Li Yun followed him to Fengxiang, but was unable to catch up with Emperor Xizong's further flight to Xingyuan. When he was at Zuntu Station (遵塗驛, near Fengxiang), he was captured by Zhu's soldiers and taken back to Fengxiang. By this point, Zhu had become convinced that Tian was a bad influence over Emperor Xizong who could never be eliminated and that he would receive the support of the other warlords if he supported a new emperor, and he consulted with the chancellor Xiao Gou, who was also unable to catch up with Emperor Xizong's flight. Xiao opposed, but Zhu ignored his opposition and forced the imperial officials who were at Fengxiang to submit a petition supporting Li Yun to take over the throne. Li Yun initially, however, only accepted the title of regent. In addition to the imperial officials at Fengxiang, the military governor Gao Pian of Huainan Circuit (淮南, headquartered in modern Yangzhou, Jiangsu), Wang, and the senior official Cui Anqian (who was then at Hezhong) also submitted petitions supporting Li Yun. Zhu's forces escorted the imperial officials and Li Yun back to Chang'an, in anticipation of Li Yun's officially taking the throne. Li Keyong, however, refused Zhu's and Li Yun's overtures and continued to send petitions to Emperor Xizong at Xingyuan; Zhu's erstwhile ally Li Changfu, angry that he was shut out of the newly formed government, also submitted a petition of support to Emperor Xizong.

== Brief reign ==
In winter 886, after the imperial officials further urged him to take the throne, Li Yun did so. He offered Emperor Xizong, in exile, the title of retired emperor (Taishang Huang).

Meanwhile, though, by this point, Tian Lingzi had abandoned his powerful post as the commander of the Shence Armies (神策軍) and sent himself to Xichuan Circuit (西川, headquartered in modern Chengdu, Sichuan) as its eunuch monitor of the army — as his older brother, Chen Jingxuan, was Xichuan's military governor. Tian's successor Yang Fugong issued an announcement to the Guanzhong region (i.e., Chang'an's surroundings) that anyone who could execute Zhu Mei would be given Zhu's post as the military governor of Jingnan. Zhu's officer Wang Xingyu, enticed, and also in fear because he was unable to complete the mission that Zhu gave him — capturing Xingyuan and seizing Emperor Xizong — decided to act. He marched back to Chang'an, catching Zhu by surprise, and killed Zhu. The officials Pei Che and Zheng Changtu, whom Li Yun had commissioned as chancellors, escorted him to Hezhong. However, by this point, Wang had agreed to again submit to Emperor Xizong, and while he initially feigned to welcome Li Yun, he instead seized and beheaded Li Yun. He delivered Li Yun's head to Xingyuan to be presented to Emperor Xizong. Initially, Emperor Xizong was to hold a grand celebration over Li Yun's death, but on the advice of the ceremonial scholar Yin Yingsun (殷盈孫), who pointed out that the death of an imperial clan member was not a good reason to celebrate, Emperor Xizong instead ordered Li Yun posthumously demoted to commoner rank and had the head buried.

== Notes and references ==
- New Book of Tang, vol. 82.
- Zizhi Tongjian, vol. 256.

Preceded by Emperor Xizong of Tang	Emperor of the Tang dynasty (Chang'an region); 886–887	Succeeded by Emperor Xizong of Tang
