= Zhu Mei =

Warlord of Chinese Tang dynasty

- Chinese: 朱玫
Transcriptions
Standard Mandarin
- Hanyu Pinyin: Zhū Méi
- Wade–Giles: Chu Mei

Zhu Mei (died 7 January 887) was a warlord of the Chinese Tang dynasty. Disillusioned with Emperor Xizong and the powerful eunuch Tian Lingzi, he tried to support Emperor Xizong's distant relative Li Yun, the Prince of Xiang, as the new emperor but was soon thereafter killed and beheaded by his own officer Wang Xingyu.

== Background ==
It is not known when Zhu Mei was born. Both his biography in the Old Book of Tang and the New Book of Tang indicated that he was from Bin Prefecture (邠州, in modern Xianyang, Shaanxi), the capital of Binning Circuit (邠寧). The Old Book of Tang further indicated that when he was young, he served in the Tang dynasty border army and eventually became a prefectural prefect, while the New Book of Tang indicated that he served as an army officer at a prefecture (implying that it was Bin Prefecture). There were records of an officer named Zhu Mei who served at Hedong Circuit (河東, headquartered in modern Taiyuan, Shanxi), who, as of 879, was serving under the military governor (jiedushi) Li Kan (李侃), who was ordered by Li Kan to arrest and kill soldiers who had previously been under the executed officer He Gongya (賀公雅) who, after He Gongya's death, were creating disturbances in the Hedong capital Taiyuan Municipality, claiming to be trying to allege He Gongya. That Zhu Mei was later, in late 880, under the command of the military governor Zheng Congdang, given the command of Hedong soldiers (along with Zhuge Shuang) and ordered to aid the imperial capital Chang'an, then under the impending attacks by the major agrarian rebel Huang Chao. It is not completely clear that this referred to the same Zhu Mei here.

In any case, as of summer 881, Zhu Mei was serving as the defender of Tongsai (通塞, in modern Xianyang), when Huang, who had by that point captured Chang'an (forcing the Tang Emperor Xizong to flee to Chengdu) and declared himself emperor of a new state of Qi, sent his general Wang Mei (王玫) to Binning to serve as its military governor. Zhu attacked and killed Wang, and then, yielding the military governor position to another officer, Li Chonggu (李重古), took his forces toward Chang'an, ready to attack Huang in coordination with other Tang generals Tang Hongfu (唐弘夫), Wang Chongrong, Wang Chucun, Tuoba Sigong, and Zheng Tian. After joint Tang forces briefly recaptured Chang'an but then were forced to abandon it again in light of a major defeat at the hands of Qi forces, Zhu, who by that point carried the title of deputy military governor of Binning, stationed his own troops at Xingping (興平, in modern Xianyang). The Qi general Wang Bo (王播) put Xingping under siege, and Zhu retreated to Fengtian (奉天, in modern Xianyang) and Longwei Slope (龍尾陂, in modern Baoji, Shaanxi).

== As military governor of Binning/Jingnan ==
In fall 881, Zhu Mei was made Binning's military governor, and, yet later in the year, was made the commander of the Tang forces south of the Wei River. After joint Tang forces recaptured Chang'an in spring 883, Emperor Xizong bestowed on him the honorary chancellor title of Tong Zhongshu Menxia Pingzhangshi (同中書門下平章事). In 884, Emperor Xizong, apparently to commemorate the contributions of the Binning soldiers, renamed the circuit Jingnan (靜難, meaning "disaster-quieting").

In 885, by which time Emperor Xizong had returned to Chang'an, the powerful eunuch Tian Lingzi became embroiled in a dispute with Wang Chongrong, then the military governor of Hezhong Circuit (河中, headquartered in modern Yuncheng, Shanxi) over Tian's attempt to seize control of salt ponds at Hezhong from Wang. Tian tried to neutralize Wang by transferring him to Taining Circuit (泰寧, headquartered in modern Jining, Shandong), but Wang refused, and Wang and his ally Li Keyong the military governor of Hedong prepared to resist. Tian, in turn, allied himself with Zhu and Li Changfu the military governor of Fengxiang Circuit (鳳翔, headquartered in modern Baoji). Zhu, in order to further instigate Emperor Xizong into ordering a campaign against Li Keyong, several times sent covert operatives into Chang'an to set fire to imperial storages or to assassinate Emperor Xizong's attendants, to blame this on Li Keyong. Tian thereafter gathered his own forces (the imperial Shence Armies) and rendezvoused with Zhu and Li Changfu. They engaged those of Li Keyong and Wang, but around the new year 886 were crushed by Li Keyong and Wang. Li Keyong then approached Chang'an, causing Tian to take Emperor Xizong to first flee to Fengxiang, and then to Xingyuan (興元, in modern Hanzhong, Shaanxi).

== Support of Li Yun as emperor ==
Most imperial officials accompanied Emperor Xizong to Fengxiang, but did not follow him to Xingyuan when Tian Lingzi took him there. While Emperor Xizong was still at Fengxiang, apparently to try to pry him from Tian's influence, the chancellor Xiao Gou summoned Zhu Mei and his troops to Fengxiang, but when Zhu arrived at Fengxiang with 5,000 soldiers, Emperor Xizong had already fled. Zhu and Li Changfu, turning against Tian, launched troops to try to chase down Emperor Xizong and Tian, but even though they initially had successes against Tian's troops, they were unable to catch up with Emperor Xizong and Tian. Zhu, however, captured Emperor Xizong's distant relative Li Yun the Prince of Xiang; he took Li Yun and returned to Fengxiang.

Zhu, concluding that Emperor Xizong could never be pried away from Tian's influence, resolved to support a new emperor, with Li Changfu's concurrence. He tried to get Xiao to cooperate with him. However, he was able to force the other imperial officials into supporting Li Yun as regent. Zhu had himself named the commander of the imperial guards, and subsequently accompanied Li Yun back to Chang'an. The chancellor Pei Che remained chancellor, while Zheng Changtu was also made chancellor to replace Xiao. Once Zhu and Li Yun arrived at Chang'an, Zhu had Li Yun bestow him the title of Palace Attendant, director of the Chancellery, as well as making him the director of the dynasty's salt and iron monopolies. It was said that some 60–70% of the regional governors agreed to support Li Yun as emperor. Li Changfu, however, angry that Zhu made himself chancellor and did not grant Li Changfu the same honors, refused to support Li Yun and instead resubmitted to Emperor Xizong. Wang Chongrong and Li Keyong also submitted petitions pledging allegiance to Emperor Xizong, despite Zhu's attempts to win them over. Li Yun nevertheless claimed the imperial title in winter 886, and honored Emperor Xizong as Taishang Huang (retired emperor).

== Death ==
Zhu Mei subsequently sent his officer Wang Xingyu, with 50,000 soldiers, to try to attack Xingyuan to capture Emperor Xizong. However, although Wang was initially able to defeat Tian's subordinate Yang Sheng (楊晟), he was subsequently repelled by Man Cun (滿存), and was unable to advance. He thus became fearful that Zhu would punish him for his failures. Further, the eunuch Yang Fugong, who had succeeded Tian by this point (as Tian had fled to Chengdu to be under the protection of his brother Chen Jingxuan the military governor of Xichuan Circuit (西川, headquartered in modern Chengdu)), issued a declaration that anyone who killed Zhu would be given Jingnan Circuit. Wang therefore decided to turn against Zhu. Around the new year 887, he returned to Chang'an without first receiving permission from Zhu. Zhu, in anger, summoned him, stating, "You returned without permission. Are you planning to commit treason?" Wang responded, "I am not committing treason. I am trying to capture the treasonous Zhu Mei!" He seized Zhu and executed him. Pei Che and Zheng Changtu escorted Li Yun and fled to Hezhong, hoping that Wang Chongrong would protect them, but Wang Chongrong instead executed Li Yun and arrested Pei and Zheng. Both Zhu's and Li Yun's heads were delivered to Xingyuan and presented to Emperor Xizong.
