= Li Changfu =

Warlord in the later years of Tang dynasty

Li Changfu (李昌符) (d. July 24, 887) was a warlord of the late Tang dynasty, who ruled Fengxiang Circuit (鳳翔, headquartered in modern Baoji, Shaanxi) from 884 to 887. In 887, his troops got into a conflict with imperial troops escorting then-reigning Emperor Xizong, and he was defeated by the imperial general Li Maozhen and subsequently executed by his own subordinate Xue Zhichou (薛知籌).

== Background and takeover of Fengxiang ==
Little is known about Li Changfu's background, as neither of the official histories of Tang Dynasty (the Old Book of Tang and the New Book of Tang) contained a biography for him. The first historical reference to him was in 884, when his older brother Li Changyan, then the military governor (Jiedushi) of Fengxiang Circuit, became ill and made Li Changfu the acting military governor. Then-reigning Emperor Xizong thereafter made Li Changfu full military governor.

== Alliance with and later turning against Zhu Mei ==
In 885, Li Changfu became involved in a power struggle that initially started as a confrontation between the powerful eunuch Tian Lingzi and Wang Chongrong the military governor of Huguo Circuit (護國, headquartered in modern Yuncheng, Shanxi), over control of salt ponds at Huguo Circuit. Tian tried to remove Wang Chongrong from the scene by having Emperor Xizong issuing an edict transferring him to Taining Circuit (泰寧, headquartered in modern Jining, Shandong), Qi Kerang the military governor of Taining to Yiwu Circuit (義武, headquartered in modern Baoding, Hebei), and Wang Chucun the military governor of Yiwu to Huguo. Wang Chongrong refused the order and prepared for confrontation with Tian, along with his ally Li Keyong the military governor of Hedong Circuit (河東, headquartered in modern Taiyuan, Shanxi), while Tian allied with Li Changfu and Zhu Mei the military governor of Jingnan Circuit (靜難, headquartered in modern Xianyang, Shaanxi). Around the new year, Li Keyong's and Wang Chongrong's troops engaged Tian's, Li Changfu's, and Zhu's troops at Shawan (沙苑, in modern Weinan, Shaanxi) and defeated them. As Li Keyong then approached the capital Chang'an, Tian took Emperor Xizong and fled to Fengxiang, and then to Xingyuan (興元, in modern Hanzhong, Shaanxi).

Meanwhile, Zhu and Li Changfu became embarrassed about their own alliance with Tian, and decided to instead support a new emperor who was not influenced by Tian. At that time, Zhu had, under his control, Emperor Xizong's distant relative Li Yun the Prince of Xiang. Under agreement with Li Changfu, he took Li Yun back to Chang'an and initially declared Li Yun regent and then emperor. They also sent troops to try to capture Emperor Xizong at Xingyuan, but they were repelled. However, after Zhu thereafter had himself made a chancellor and was showing that he was controlling Li Yun's court by himself, Li Changfu, in anger, refused all titles bestowed by Li Yun, instead submitting a petition to Emperor Xizong at Xingyuan to pledge his loyalty. Emperor Xizong thus bestowed on Li Changfu the honorary title of acting Situ (司徒, one of the Three Excellencies).

== Defeat and death ==
In late 886, Zhu was killed by his own officer Wang Xingyu, and Li Yun fled to Wang Chongrong but was killed by Wang. As Emperor Xizong subsequently prepared to return to Chang'an in spring 887, he went first to Fengxiang. Li Changfu, fearing that once Emperor Xizong returned to Chang'an he might revisit the issue of how Li Changfu had previously allied with Zhu and tried to capture him or, at the very least, show less favor to him, asked Emperor Xizong to stay at Fengxiang longer under the excuse that the palace in Chang'an had not been repaired. Emperor Xizong agreed.

Keeping the emperor at Fengxiang would turn disastrous for Li Changfu, however. In summer 887, there was an incident that started when Li Changfu's procession encountered that of the imperial general Yang Shouli (楊守立). Their soldiers fought with each other, and the fight would not stop despite interventions by Emperor Xizong's eunuchs. That night, Li Changfu attacked Emperor Xizong's provisional palace at Fengxiang, but was soon defeated by Yang. He took his family and fled to Long Prefecture (隴州, in modern Baoji). Emperor Xizong thereafter sent the imperial general Li Maozhen the military governor of Wuding Circuit (武定, headquartered in modern Hanzhong) to attack Li Changfu at Long Prefecture. Subsequently, in fall 887, Xue Zhichou, the prefect of Long, surrendered, and slaughtered Li Changfu and his family. Li Maozhen thereafter took over Fengxiang Circuit.
