= Tian Lingzi =

Tang Chinese eunuch

Tian Lingzi (田令孜) (died 893), courtesy name Zhongze (仲則), formally the Duke of Jin (晉公), was a powerful eunuch during the reign of Emperor Xizong of Tang. During most of Emperor Xizong's reign, he had a stranglehold on power due to his close personal relationship with Emperor Xizong as well as his control over the eunuch-commanded Shence Armies, even throughout Emperor Xizong's flight to Xichuan Circuit (西川, headquartered in modern Chengdu, Sichuan) in the face of Huang Chao's agrarian rebellion. Late in Emperor Xizong's reign, he was forced to give up his powerful position after his dispute with the warlord Wang Chongrong led to multiple rebellions that rendered the Tang court virtually powerless over the warlords, and he was given refuge by his brother Chen Jingxuan, the military governor of Xichuan. In 891, however, Chen was defeated by Wang Jian and forced to surrender Xichuan to Wang. In 893, Wang put Chen and Tian to death.

== Background ==
It is not known when Tian Lingzi was born. He was originally surnamed Chen and had at least two brothers, Chen Jingxuan and Chen Jingxun (陳敬珣). The historical accounts were inconsistent as to whether he was from the Shu (蜀, i.e., modern Sichuan) region (as per his biography in the New Book of Tang) or from Xu Prefecture (許州, in modern Xuchang, Henan) (as per the Zizhi Tongjian when describing Chen Jingxuan's origins) It was said that he entered the palace as an eunuch under his adoptive father, presumably a eunuch named Tian, during the middle of Emperor Yizong's Xiantong era (860–874). It was said that he was literate, read much, and was capable of strategies. During Emperor Yizong's reign, he served as a eunuch who oversaw the imperial stables, and he became close to Emperor Yizong's son Li Yan the Prince of Pu.

== During Emperor Xizong's reign ==
=== Before Huang Chao's attack on Chang'an ===
Emperor Yizong died in 873, and Li Yan, with the support of the eunuchs Liu Xingshen (劉行深) and Han Wenyue (韓文約), who were then the commanders of the Shence Armies, was made emperor (as Emperor Xizong). Soon after Emperor Xizong became emperor, he made Tian Lingzi one of the directors of palace communications (Shumishi), and in 875 further made Tian the commander of the Right Shence Army. It was said that because Emperor Xizong, who was then 13, liked to spend his time in games, he entrusted the matters of state to Tian, and went as far as referring to Tian as "Father." Whenever Tian met with Emperor Xizong, he would prepare two plates of snacks, and they would drink and snack together. At Tian's suggestion, much of the wealth of the Chang'an merchants were seized and placed in the palace storage. Anyone who dared to complain was battered to death, and the imperial officials did not dare to intercede.

As of 880, the Tang realm was being overrun by agrarian rebels, the strongest of which was Huang Chao. As the imperial armies were having difficulty containing the rebellions, Tian began considering the contingency plan, in case Chang'an were attacked, of taking the emperor to the Shu region. He thus recommended his brother Chen Jingxuan, who was then a general of the imperial guards, as well as several generals he trusted, Yang Shili, Niu Xu (牛勗), and Luo Yuangao (羅元杲), as potential military governors for the region, also known as the Sanchuan (三川) — i.e., the three circuits of Xichuan, Dongchuan (東川, headquartered in modern Mianyang, Sichuan), and Shannan West (山南西道, headquartered in modern Hanzhong, Shaanxi). Emperor Xizong had the four of them play a ballgame to determine the order they would be commissioned. Chen won the game, and was made the military governor of Xichuan, while Yang was given Dongchuan and Niu Shannan West. During this period, Tian governed in association with the chancellor Lu Xi.

By winter 880, Huang was approaching Tong Pass. Tian and the chancellor Cui Hang suggested that Emperor Xizong carry out the contingency plan to flee to the Sanchuan region. Emperor Xizong initially refused and ordered Tian to have the imperial guards try to defend Tong Pass. The soldiers that Tian was able to gather, however, were new and inexperienced, and they were unable to aid the imperial forces already gathered at Tong Pass in time. Tian blamed Lu for the defeats, and Lu committed suicide. He then took Emperor Xizong, along with four imperial princes and a few imperial consorts, and fled Chang'an, heading toward Xichuan's capital Chengdu. Huang took Chang'an and, after initially living at Tian's mansion and then moving into the palace, declared himself the emperor of a new state of Qi.

=== During Emperor Xizong's first flight from Chang'an ===
Emperor Xizong's train first fled to Fengxiang Circuit (鳳翔, headquartered in modern Baoji, Shaanxi), where the former chancellor Zheng Tian was military governor. After authorizing Zheng to oversee the resistance operation against Huang Chao, Emperor Xizong further fled to Shannan West, and then, at Chen Jingxuan's invitation, to Xichuan. (It was on this flight from Chang'an that Tian Lingzi would offend Emperor Xizong's brother Li Jie the Prince of Shou — the future Emperor Zhaozong, as during the flight, there was a time when Li Jie, then 13, became exhausted as the imperial train was going through rugged terrain on foot. He requested that Tian give him a horse, and Tian responded, "We are in high mountains. Where can we find horses?" Tian then hit the prince with a whip and ordered him to continue, causing Li Jie to bear a deep grudge against him.)

Once the imperial train arrived at Xichuan's capital Chengdu, however, Tian quickly alienated the Xichuan troops by giving great rewards to the imperial guard soldiers that followed Emperor Xizong to Chengdu, while not sharing those rewards with Xichuan troops. After the officer Guo Qi (郭琪) complained, Tian tried to poison Guo to death, but failed. Guo responded by starting a mutiny, but his mutiny was quickly defeated. When the advisory official Meng Zhaotu (孟昭圖) submitted a petition that urged Emperor Xizong to not just consult with Tian and Chen on the affairs of state but to listen to advice from the chancellors, Tian suppressed Meng's petition, exiled Meng, and had Meng killed in exile, to stifle criticism. Subsequently, when the lead chancellor Wang Duo was put in charge of the overall operations against Huang but was initially unsuccessful until Wang adopted the suggestion by the eunuch monitor Yang Fuguang to enlist the aid of the Shatuo chieftain Li Keyong, Tian used this as excuse, in spring 883, after the imperial forces defeated Huang and caused Huang to abandon Chang'an, to remove Wang as the commander of the operations against Huang. Further, he persuaded the chancellors and the regional governors to submit petitions to Emperor Xizong praising Tian himself of his contributions, and therefore Emperor Xizong made Tian the commander of all imperial guards. Later in the year, after Yang Fuguang died, Tian used the opportunity to remove Yang Fuguang's cousin Yang Fugong from his post as director of palace communications. Meanwhile, Zheng Tian, who by this point was at Chengdu and serving as chancellor, was not willing to simply agree with Tian's and Chen's requests, and Tian reacted by encouraging Li Changyan (a subordinate of Zheng's who had expelled Zheng from Fengxiang in 881) to threaten not to allow Zheng through Fengxiang when Emperor Xizong would be returning to Chang'an. Zheng was forced to resign and retire to Peng Prefecture (彭州, in modern Chengdu).

Meanwhile, Tian and Chen had also alienated Yang Shili by promising to make another general, Gao Renhou, the military governor of Dongchuan. Tian tried to preempt any actions Yang might take by summoning Yang to Chengdu in spring 884. Yang reacted by openly declaring a campaign against Tian and Chen. Gao subsequently waged a campaign against Yang, putting Dongchuan's capital Zi Prefecture (梓州) under siege. Yang's subordinate Zheng Junxiong (鄭君雄) then killed Yang and surrendered.

By this point, one of the former subordinates of Yang Fuguang's, Lu Yanhong, had seized Shannan West Circuit. Tian enticed Lu's subordinates Wang Jian, Han Jian, Zhang Zao (張造), Jin Hui (晉暉), and Li Shitai (李師泰) to abandon Lu and flee to him. Tian then adopted the five of them as sons, and put them directly under his command without incorporating them into the imperial guard command structure. He then attacked Lu, and Lu abandoned Shannan West and fled. Subsequently, in spring 885, with Tian escorting him, Emperor Xizong finally returned to Chang'an, yet Tian continued to be in control of the governance.

=== During and after Emperor Xizong's second flight from Chang'an ===
Once the imperial train returned to Chang'an, however, the imperial government was caught in a major financial crunch — as, in the aftermaths of Huang Chao's rebellion, the circuits became far more independent from the imperial government than ever, and were not submitting their tax revenues to the imperial government, which was only receiving such remittance from Chang'an and the surrounding regions. As Tian Lingzi greatly expanded the Shence Armies during the time Emperor Xizong was in Xichuan, the imperial government was unable to pay for all of the soldiers' and officials' salaries. Tian tried to remedy the situation by ordering the control of the salt pools in Hezhong Circuit (河中, headquartered in modern Yuncheng, Shanxi) be returned to the imperial government so that the revenues could be restored. The military governor of Hezhong, Wang Chongrong, did not want to give up the salt pools, and submitted repeated petitions opposing the order. The situation was further exacerbated when Tian sent his adoptive son Tian Kuangyou (田匡祐) to Hezhong as an emissary, as, while Wang initially received Tian Kuangyou with respect, Tian Kuangyou's arrogance offended the Hezhong soldiers. Wang thereafter publicly denounced Tian Kuangyou and Tian Lingzi, and it was only at the intercession of the Hezhong eunuch monitor that Wang allowed Tian Kuangyou to leave Hezhong. When Tian Kuangyou returned to Chang'an, he urged Tian Lingzi to take action against Wang. In summer 885, Tian had Emperor Xizong issue an edict transferring Wang to Taining Circuit (泰寧, headquartered in modern Jining, Shandong), Taining's military governor Qi Kerang to Yiwu Circuit (義武, headquartered in modern Baoding, Hebei), and Yiwu's military governor Wang Chucun to Hezhong. Wang Chongrong, incensed, refused to report to Taining and aligned himself with Li Keyong, who had then become the military governor of Hedong Circuit (河東, headquartered in modern Taiyuan, Shanxi). He also submitted a petition denouncing Tian Lingzi for 10 crimes. (Wang Chucun also tried to intercede on Wang Chongrong's behalf, but Tian did not relent.) Tian, in turn, aligned himself with Li Changyan's brother Li Changfu (who had succeeded Li Changyan as the military governor of Fengxiang after Li Changyan's death in 884) and Zhu Mei the military governor of Jingnan Circuit (靜難, headquartered in modern Xianyang, Shaanxi).

The Shence Army soldiers rendezvoused with the Jingnan and Fengxiang soldiers, and they attacked Hezhong. Wang Chongrong and Li Keyong then joined forces and engaged the Shence/Jingnan/Fengxiang armies at Shayuan (沙苑, in modern Weinan, Shaanxi) in winter 885. The Hezhong/Hedong forces prevailed, and after the defeat, Zhu and Li Changfu fled back to their own circuits. Li Keyong headed toward Chang'an. Tian escorted Emperor Xizong and fled to Fengxiang. Tian then, against Emperor Xizong's wishes, forced Emperor Xizong to further flee to Shannan West's capital Xingyuan (興元). It was said that, by this point, the people of the realm were thoroughly disgusted with Tian, and Zhu and Li Changfu, ashamed of aligning with him, also turned against him, and sent soldiers to chase after Emperor Xizong. They were not successful, however, and the imperial guards subsequently took control of Xingyuan, forcing Zhu's ally Shi Junshe (石君涉) to flee. Meanwhile, Zhu captured Emperor Xizong's distant relative Li Yun the Prince of Xiang and had Li Yun declared emperor at Chang'an. Facing universal condemnation, Tian recommended Yang Fugong to succeed him and commissioned himself as the eunuch monitor of the Xichuan army, and subsequently left for Xichuan.

By 887, Zhu had been killed by his own subordinate Wang Xingyu, and Wang Chongrong killed Li Yun. Emperor Xizong was thus able to return to Chang'an. He issued an edict stripping Tian of all of his titles and exiling Tian to Duan Prefecture (端州, in modern Zhaoqing, Guangdong). However, as Tian was then under Chen Jingxuan's protection, the exile order was never carried out.

Meanwhile, Tian's former subordinate and adoptive son Wang Jian had taken his soldiers and made them into a band of roving raiders, loosely aligned with Gu Yanlang the military governor of Dongchuan. Chen feared that Wang and Gu would join their forces and attack Xichuan. Tian suggested that he try to summon Wang to join the Xichuan army, and Chen agreed. Tian did so in winter 887, but subsequently, as Wang was marching toward Xichuan in response to Tian's summons, Chen's subordinate Li Ai (李乂) persuaded him that Wang would be dangerous to have in his realm. Chen thereafter tried to stop Wang from further advancing. Wang, in anger, defeated soldiers that Chen sent to try to stop him, and marched all the way to Chengdu. When Tian went onto the city walls to try to resolve the situation, Wang bowed to him but stated that since the situation left him with nowhere to go, he would be truly a rebel from this point on. Wang put Chengdu under siege, but was unable to immediately capture it. Emperor Xizong sent emissaries to try to mediate the situation, but neither Chen nor Wang accepted the mediation.

== During Emperor Zhaozong's reign ==
Emperor Xizong died in spring 888, and his younger brother Li Jie, with Yang Fugong's support, became emperor (as Emperor Zhaozong). Meanwhile, Wang Jian submitted a petition to the new emperor condemning Chen Jingxuan and offering to serve as an assistant to any general that the imperial government might commission to replace Chen. Gu Yanlang also submitted a petition requesting that Chen be transferred. Emperor Zhaozong, who still bore a grudge against Tian, decided to accept Wang and Gu's proposal. He commissioned the chancellor Wei Zhaodu as the military governor of Xichuan to replace Chen and summoned Chen back to Chang'an to serve as a general of the imperial guards. When Chen refused, he declared Chen a renegade and ordered Wei, Wang, and Gu to attack.

The imperial campaign against Chen, however, stalled, despite the joint forces' putting Chengdu under siege. By 891 Emperor Zhaozong's officials had become convinced that it would not succeed. Emperor Zhaozong therefore issued an edict restoring Chen's titles and ordering Gu and Wang (whom Emperor Zhaozong had given the title of military governor of a newly carved out Yongping Circuit (永平, headquartered in modern Chengdu at nearby Qiong Prefecture) to return to their own posts. Wang, believing that success was imminent, instead intimidated Wei into surrendering his army to Wang and returning to Chang'an. Wang took control of the army and continued the intense attacks on Chengdu, while sending parts of the army to capture the other cities of Xichuan. Wang also cut off supplies that Yang Sheng (楊晟) was sending from Peng Prefecture (彭州, in modern Chengdu) to Chengdu.

In fall 888, desperate, Tian conversed with Wang from the top of the city walls. Wang promised that he would continue to treat Tian as a father if Chen surrendered. That night, Tian went to Wang's camp and formally surrendered Chen's seals. Wang accepted, and apologized to Tian, asking that the father-son relationship be restored. Wang took control of Xichuan. He commissioned Chen's son Chen Tao (陳陶) as the prefect of Ya Prefecture (雅州, in modern Ya'an, Sichuan) and had Chen Jingxuan accompany his son to Ya Prefecture. Meanwhile, he kept Tian under house arrest in Chengdu.

Despite Wang's declaration that he would honor Tian again as father, he was repeatedly submitting petitions to the imperial government to order the executions of Chen Jingxuan and Tian. The imperial government never did so, however, and in summer 893 Wang decided to take things into his own hands. Accusing Chen of plotting a rebellion, he put Chen to death. He also accused Tian of communicating with Fengxiang's then-military governor Li Maozhen (whom Tian had treated well before while Li Maozhen served at the Shence Armies and who had tried to intercede on Tian's behalf) and put Tian to death. As he was facing death, Tian tore apart linen strips and stated to the executioner, "I had previously overseen the 10 armies [(i.e., the imperial guards)]. You need to kill me properly." He then showed the executioner how he could be strangled with the linen, and the executioner did so. Later, during the middle of Emperor Zhaozong's Qianning era (894–898), for reasons unclear, Tian's titles were posthumously restored.

== Modern references ==
Hong Kong actor Kent Tong portrayed Tian Lingzi in the 2014 Chinese television series The Great Southern Migration.

== Notes and references ==
- Old Book of Tang, vol. 184.
- New Book of Tang, vol. 208.
- Zizhi Tongjian, vols. 252, 253, 254, 255, 256, 257, 258, 259.
