= Wang Duo =

Wang Duo (王鐸) (died 884), courtesy name Zhaofan (昭範), formally the Duke of Jin (晉公), was a Chinese politician of the medieval Tang dynasty, serving as a chancellor during the reigns of Emperor Yizong and Emperor Yizong's son Emperor Xizong. After the agrarian rebel Huang Chao captured the Tang capital Chang'an in 880 and forced Emperor Xizong to flee, Wang was commissioned by Emperor Xizong to serve as the supreme commander of Tang forces in the central and eastern empire, effectively serving as viceroy with full imperial authorities to issue edicts, and Wang was instrumental in the various Tang maneuvers, including persuading Li Keyong and Zhu Quanzhong to join the Tang cause, in defeating Huang. In 884, on his way to his new post as the military governor (jiedushi) of Yichang Circuit (義昌, headquartered in modern Cangzhou, Hebei), Le Congxun (樂從訓) the son of Le Yanzhen the military governor of Weibo Circuit (魏博, headquartered in modern Handan, Hebei), enticed by the group of women that accompanied Wang, ambushed Wang and killed him, taking the women captive.

== Background ==
It is not known when Wang Duo was born. He came from a prominent aristocratic family, as his uncle Wang Bo served as a chancellor during the reigns of Emperor Muzong and Emperor Muzong's son Emperor Wenzong, although Wang Duo's father Wang Yan (王炎) died early and therefore did not reach high positions. Wang Duo himself passed the imperial examinations in the Jinshi class early in the Huichang era (841–847) of Emperor Wenzong's brother Emperor Wuzong, and subsequently served two terms on staffs of regional governors. Early in the reign of Emperor Wuzong's uncle and successor Emperor Xuānzong, he was recalled to the capital Chang'an to serve as an imperial censor with the title of Jiancha Yushi (監察御史), and subsequently served on the staff of the former chancellor Bai Minzhong when Bai served as the military governor (jiedushi) of Xichuan Circuit (西川, headquartered in modern Chengdu, Sichuan).

== During Emperor Yizong's reign ==
Early in the Xiantong era (860–874) of Emperor Xuānzong's son and successor Emperor Yizong, Wang Duo was recalled to Chang'an to serve as Jiabu Langzhong (駕部郎中), a supervisory official at the ministry of defense (兵部, Bingbu), and was put in charge of drafting edicts. He was later made Zhongshu Sheren (中書舍人), a mid-level official at the legislative bureau of government (中書省, Zhongshu Sheng). In 864, he was made the deputy minister of rites (禮部侍郎, Libu Shilang), and in that capacity oversaw the imperial examinations for two years. It was said that he chose the passing examinees properly and was praised for it. In 866, he was made deputy minister of census (戶部侍郎, Hubu Shilang) and the director of finances.

In 870, by which time Wang was referred to as the minister of defense (兵部尚書, Bingbu Shangshu) and the director of the salt and iron monopolies, Emperor Yizong made him the minister of rites (禮部尚書, Libu Shangshu) and gave him the designation Tong Zhongshu Menxia Pingzhangshi (同中書門下平章事), making him a chancellor de facto. At that time, fellow chancellor Wei Baoheng (Emperor Yizong's son-in-law) was very powerful, and Wei honored Wang as the one who selected him when he passed the imperial examinations. However, because of this, when Wei tried to install his followers as imperial officials, Wang resisted. As a result, due to Wei's efforts, in 873, Wang was sent out of the capital to serve as the military governor of Xuanwu Circuit (宣武, headquartered in modern Kaifeng, Henan), still carrying the Tong Zhongshu Menxia Pingzhangshi title as an honorary title.

== During Emperor Xizong's reign ==
=== Before Huang Chao's occupation of Chang'an ===
Emperor Yizong died later in 873 and was succeeded by his young son Emperor Xizong. As both the powerful eunuch Tian Lingzi and the chancellor Zheng Tian believed Wang to be capable, Wang was soon recalled to serve as Zuo Pushe (左僕射), one of the heads of the executive bureau (尚書省, Shangshu Sheng), and in 876 was restored to the chancellorship with the designation of Tong Zhongshu Menxia Pingzhangshi as well as the title of Menxia Shilang (門下侍郎), to assist dealing with the deepening crises of multiple agrarian rebellions, the largest of which were led by Wang Xianzhi and Huang Chao, who by that point had merged their armies.

Later in 876, Wang Xianzhi captured Ru Prefecture (汝州, in modern Pingdingshan, Henan) and took Wang Duo's younger brother Wang Liao (王鐐) captive. Subsequently, when Wang Xianzhi attacked Qi Prefecture (蘄州, in modern Huanggang, Hubei), Wang Xianzhi had Wang Liao negotiate on his behalf with the prefect of Qi Prefecture, Pei Wo (裴偓). Subsequently, Pei and Wang Liao negotiated terms under which Wang Xianzhi would submit to imperial authority and receive an imperial commission. Pei thus opened the city gates and invited Wang Xianzhi and his top lieutenants, including Huang, into the city, and submitted a petition to Emperor Xizong requesting that Wang Xianzhi be given an imperial commission. Most chancellors opposed, but at Wang Duo's insistence, Emperor Xizong issued a commission naming Wang Xianzhi an officer of the imperial guards. However, Huang was angered that he did not receive a commission as well, and attacked Wang Xianzhi physically. Wang Xianzhi, in fear, turned down the commission and pillaged Qi Prefecture. Pei fled, while Wang Xianzhi and Huang parted ways and continued their campaigns against Tang forces.

In 877, while the campaigns against Wang Xianzhi and Huang continued, Wang Duo and fellow chancellor Lu Xi had a major disagreement with Zheng about the command structure of the imperial army sent against Wang Xianzhi and Huang—as Wang Duo and Lu wanted to put the imperial guard general Zhang Zimian (張自勉) under the command of Song Wei (宋威), but Zheng believed that, due to the rivalry between Zhang and Song, if Zhang fell under Song's command, Song would find an excuse to kill him, and therefore refused to concur in Wang Duo's and Lu's recommendation. This disagreement escalated such that Wang Duo and Lu offered to resign and Zheng offered to retire. Emperor Xizong did not approve any of these offers.

In 878, the imperial general Zeng Yuanyu (曾元裕) defeated and killed Wang Xianzhi in battle, but the agrarian rebels thereafter came under Huang's banner and continued to threaten Tang rule. In 879, Wang Duo offered to oversee the operations, so he was made the military governor of Jingnan Circuit (荊南, headquartered in modern Jingzhou, Hubei) and the supreme commander of the imperial forces in the southern circuits, to oversee the operation against Huang; he also carried the honorary titles of acting Situ (司徒, one of the Three Excellencies) and Shizhong (侍中). Once Wang arrived at Jingnan, it was said that he shored up the circuit's defenses immediately. However, he also made poor move in commissioning the general Li Xi (李係) as deputy supreme commander and the governor of Hunan Circuit (湖南, headquartered in modern Changsha, Hunan), to be stationed at Hunan's capital Tan Prefecture (in modern Changsha, Hunan) to intercept Huang, despite the fact that Li Xi actually had no military talent, just on the basis that Li Xi spoke well and was a great-grandson of the great general Li Sheng. In winter 879, after Huang abandoned Guang Prefecture (廣州, in modern Guangzhou, Guangdong) and headed north, Huang attacked Li Xi and easily defeated him. With the troops that he was expecting not yet gathered, Wang Duo fled Jingnan's capital Jianling and left his officer Liu Hanhong in Jiangling's defense, but as soon as he left Jiangling, Liu pillaged Jiangling, took his forces, and became a rebel as well. As a result of this disaster, around the new year 880, Wang was made an advisor to the Crown Prince—a completely honorary title as there was no crown prince at the time—with his office at the eastern capital Luoyang. The title of supreme commander was instead bestowed on the general Gao Pian, the military governor of Huainan Circuit (淮南, headquartered in modern Yangzhou, Jiangsu).

=== During Huang Chao's occupation of Chang'an ===
Late in 880, with Gao unable or unwilling to make an effort to stop Huang, Huang attacked Chang'an and captured it, declaring himself as the emperor of a new state of Qi. Emperor Xizong fled to Xichuan Circuit. Wang Duo followed Emperor Xizong to Xichuan, and in spring 881 was again made chancellor with the titles of Tong Zhongshu Menxia Pingzhangshi, Menxia Shilang, and acting Situ, and soon thereafter was also made Shizhong. Wang, seeing that Gao, while serving as titular supreme commander, was taking no actions against Huang, again offered to oversee the operations against Huang. In spring 882, Wang was made the military governor of Yicheng Circuit (義成, headquartered in modern Anyang, Henan) and the supreme commander of the imperial forces as well as the director of taxation. The general Cui Anqian was made his deputy. Wang was also apparently given the authority to issue edicts in Emperor Xizong's name, and thereafter frequently did so as part of the operations. Wang also soon led the armies of Xichuan, Dongchuan (東川, headquartered in modern Mianyang, Sichuan), and Shannan West (山南西道, headquartered in modern Hanzhong, Shaanxi) forces and approached Chang'an, rendezvousing with other Tang imperial generals to encircle the Chang'an region, intending to recapture it. With the Tang imperial forces converging, one of Huang's key followers, Zhu Wen, then defending Tong Prefecture (同州, in modern Weinan, Shaanxi), surrendered to Tang, and Wang commissioned him as the military governor of Tonghua (同華, headquartered at Tong Prefecture). Meanwhile, under the suggestion of the eunuch monitor of the army, Yang Fuguang, Wang also issued an edict pardoning the Shatuo chieftain Li Keyong, who had rebelled against Tang authorities prior, and commissioning Li Keyong to attack Huang's Qi state. Li Keyong accepted the commission and joined the campaign against Huang. Wang also issued an order to Zheng Congdang the military governor of Hedong Circuit (河東, headquartered in modern Taiyuan, Shanxi), who had not previously permitted Li Keyong to pass through his circuit, to allow Li Keyong to pass.

However, with Tang forces converging on Chang'an and with Li Keyong being the leader in the campaign against Huang, in spring 883, under Tian Lingzi's advice, Emperor Xizong suddenly relieved Wang of his supreme commander post and had him report to Yicheng Circuit, as Tian accused Wang of not being able to recapture Chang'an without accepting the Yang-suggested idea of summoning the Shatuo—i.e., crediting Yang, rather than Wang, with the victories. Still, for Wang's accomplishments, he was created the Duke of Jin.

=== After Huang Chao's occupation of Chang'an ===
Subsequently, Chang'an was recaptured, and Huang left the region and fled back east. As part of the continued operations against Huang (who was later killed in early 884 by his own nephew Lin Yan (林言)) Zhu Wen (whose name had been changed to Zhu Quanzhong by this point) was made the military governor of nearby Xuanwu Circuit. As Wang had previously commissioned Zhu, he thought he could depend on Zhu's assistance, and initially Zhu did assist Wang in maintaining the defenses of Yicheng Circuit. However, by fall 884, Zhu, himself more and more secure at Xuanwu by this point, was growing arrogant in his contacts with Wang, and Wang came to see that Zhu could not be depended on. Fearing that his own defensive position was threatened by Zhu, Wang requested to return to the imperial government (which had returned to Chang'an). Instead, however, he received an order transferring him to Yichang Circuit.

Wang had often had a large group of concubines and other women accompany him. As he reported to Yichang, he went through Weibo Circuit, and the women wore grand clothing as if they were in peace time. Le Congxun, the son of Weibo's military governor Le Yanzhen, was enticed, and stationed several hundred soldiers near Weibo's capital Wei Prefecture (魏州). They ambushed Wang's procession and killed Wang and some 300 of his staff members, seizing Wang's wealth and women. Le Yanzhen submitted a report blaming bandits for Wang's death, and the greatly weakened Tang court could do nothing about it.

== Notes and references ==
- Old Book of Tang, vol. 164.
- New Book of Tang, vol. 185.
- Zizhi Tongjian, vols. 252, 253, 254, 255, 256.
