= Xu Yanruo =

Xu Yanruo (徐彥若) (died 901), courtesy name Yuzhi (俞之), formally the Duke of Qi (齊公), was an official of the Chinese Tang dynasty, serving as a chancellor during the reign of Emperor Zhaozong.

== Background and early career ==
It is not known when Xu Yanruo was born. He was a sixth-generation descendant of Xu Yougong (徐有功), a famed judge during the reign of Wu Zetian. His family claimed to be originally descended from mythical Xia dynasty judge Gao Yao and traced its ancestry through a line of officials of Qin dynasty, Han dynasty, Cao Wei, Jin dynasty (266–420), Liu Song, Southern Qi, Liang dynasty, Chen dynasty, and Tang dynasty. His grandfather Xu Zai (徐宰) served as a judge at the supreme court (大理寺, Dali Si), and his father Xu Shang was a chancellor during the reign of Emperor Yizong. Xu Yanruo had at least four younger brothers, Xu Rensi (徐仁嗣), Xu Renju (徐仁矩), Xu Renfan (徐仁範), and Xu Renxu (徐仁勗).

Xu Yanruo passed the imperial examinations in the Jinshi (進士) class in 872, during Emperor Yizong's reign. Late in the reign of Emperor Yizong's son Emperor Xizong, he became a low-level official at the executive bureau of government (尚書省, Shangshu Sheng) but was given the responsibility of drafting edicts. He was later made Zhongshu Sheren (中書舍人), a mid-level official at the legislative bureau (中書省, Zhongshu Sheng).

== During Emperor Zhaozong's reign ==
=== Before chancellorship ===
Emperor Xizong died in 888 and was succeeded by his brother Emperor Zhaozong. Emperor Zhaozong made Xu Yanruo the deputy chief imperial censor (御史中丞, Yushi Zhongcheng). In 891, after a failed imperial campaign against the warlord Li Keyong the military governor of Hedong Circuit (河東, headquartered in modern Taiyuan, Shanxi), chancellors Zhang Jun and Kong Wei, who advocated for the campaign, were removed from their positions. Xu was made chancellor with the designation Tong Zhongshu Menxia Pingzhangshi (同中書門下平章事), along with Cui Zhaowei, to replace them. Xu was also made the deputy minister of census (戶部侍郎, Hubu Shilang).

=== As chancellor ===
As of 893, the warlord Li Maozhen the military governor of Fengxiang Circuit (鳳翔, headquartered in modern Baoji, Shaanxi) had defeated another warlord, Yang Shouliang the military governor of Shannan West Circuit (山南西道, headquartered in modern Hanzhong, Shaanxi). He submitted a petition to Emperor Zhaozong, offering to be the military governor of Shannan West—fully expecting that Emperor Zhaozong would allow him to be the military governor of both Fengxiang and Shannan West. Instead, Emperor Zhaozong, who wanted to take back some of the territory for the imperial government, issued an edict making Li Maozhen the military governor of Shannan West and neighboring Wuding Circuit (武定, also headquartered in modern Hanzhong), while naming Xu Yanruo the military governor of Fengxiang. Li Maozhen, disappointed, refused to obey the edict. In fall 893, Emperor Zhaozong put Li Sizhou (李嗣周) the Prince of Qin in command of a newly conscripted imperial army to escort Xu to Fengxiang. Li Maozhen and his ally Wang Xingyu the military governor of Jingnan Circuit (靜難, headquartered in modern Xianyang, Shaanxi) reacted by mobilizing their troops, ready to face the imperial troops. The imperial troops panicked and deserted, and Li Maozhen and Wang approached the capital Chang'an, forcing Emperor Zhaozong to force the chancellor Du Rangneng, whom he had put in charge of the campaign logistics despite Du's misgivings about the campaign, to commit suicide. Emperor Zhaozong was also forced to recall Xu and allow Li Maozhen to be the military governor of both Fengxiang and Shannan West. After Xu was recalled to the capital, he was made the chief imperial censor (御史大夫, Yushi Daifu).

After another chancellor, Zheng Qi, retired in 894, Xu was made a chancellor again with the designation of Tong Zhongshu Menxia Pingzhangshi; he was also made Zhongshu Shilang (中書侍郎), the deputy head of the legislative bureau of government (中書省, Zhongshu Sheng), as well as the minister of civil service affairs (吏部尚書, Libu Shangshu). When Li Maozhen and Wang again attacked Chang'an in 895 and killed the chancellors Wei Zhaodu and Li Xi, Emperor Zhaozong fled the capital into the Qinling Mountains. Xu, along with other chancellors Wang Tuan and Cui Zhaowei, followed him; they (and the emperor) were subsequently able to return to Chang'an after Li Keyong defeated Wang and forced Li Maozhen and another ally, Han Jian the military governor of Zhenguo Circuit (鎮國, headquartered in modern Weinan, Shaanxi), into temporary submission. After Emperor Zhaozong returned to Chang'an, he gave Xu the honorary titles of Kaifu Yitong Sansi (開府儀同三司) and acting Sikong (司空, one of the Three Excellencies), and created him the Duke of Qi.

In 896, when Li Maozhen again postured to attack Chang'an, Emperor Zhaozong and his court fled the capital, initially intending to flee to Li Keyong's Hedong Circuit. However, they became weary of the long journey there, and when Han made assurances that he was loyal to the emperor, Emperor Zhaozong and the imperial officials went to Zhenguo's capital Hua Prefecture (華州). While Emperor Zhaozong was there, apparently because Li Maozhen's soldiers had burned most of the city of Chang'an, Emperor Zhaozong commissioned Xu as the overseer of Daming Palace (大明宮) and the comforter of the Chang'an region, apparently intending to have Xu be in charge of rebuilding the city, although Xu's role, if any, in the subsequent rebuilding is unclear. After Emperor Zhaozong was able to return to Chang'an in 898, Xu was further given the title of Taibao (太保), above the Three Excellencies, and made Menxia Shilang (門下侍郎), the deputy head of the examination bureau (門下省, Menxia Sheng).

=== After chancellorship ===
By fall 900, Cui Yin was the most powerful chancellor at court, and he was jealous of Xu Yanruo's status with titles above his own. Sensing this, Xu offered to resign, and further specifically asked to be the military governor of Qinghai Circuit (清海, headquartered in modern Guangzhou, Guangdong), whose then-military governor, Li Zhirou the Prince of Xue, was one of the few remaining military governors still obedient to the imperial government and therefore would accept being replaced. Emperor Zhaozong thereafter commissioned Xu as the military governor of Qinghai and had him retain the Tong Zhongshu Menxia Pingzhangshi designation as an honorary designation. (As Li Zhirou died in late 900 while still serving as the military governor of Qinghai, it may be assumed that Xu did not reach Qinghai prior to Li's death.) (While on the way to Qinghai, Xu went through Jingnan Circuit (荊南, headquartered in modern Jingzhou, Hubei, not the same circuit Wang Xingyu ruled). The military governor Cheng Rui held a feast for him, but brought up an old dispute between them—Xu's refusal to order the returns of Li (澧州) and Lang (朗州, both in modern Changde, Hunan) Prefectures, both of which previously belonged to Jingnan but which had since been taken by Lei Man the military governor of Wuzhen Circuit (武貞, headquartered at Lang Prefecture) while Xu was chancellor. Xu pointed out that Cheng was an honored military governor who compared himself to Duke Huan of Qi and Duke Wen of Jin, and therefore should have been able to defeat Lei himself. Cheng was embarrassed by Xu's analysis.)

Xu died in late 901, while still serving as the military governor of Qinghai. In his final petition to the emperor, he recommended the commander of the Qinghai army, Liu Yin, to serve as acting military governor. (Liu's family would thereafter retain control of the circuit, and Liu's younger brother Liu Yan would eventually establish the state of Southern Han with Qinghai as its base.)

== Notes and references ==
- Old Book of Tang, vol. 179.
- New Book of Tang, vol. 113.
- Zizhi Tongjian, vols. 258, 259, 260, 262.
