= Li Zhirou =

Li Zhirou (李知柔; died 900), formally the Prince of Xue (薛王), was an official of the Chinese Tang dynasty, who briefly served as a chancellor in 895 during the reign of Emperor Zhaozong, to whom he was a distant relative.

== Background ==
It is not known when Li Zhirou was born. He was descended from Emperor Ruizong through Emperor Ruizong's son Li Ye (李業) the Prince of Xue (who was posthumously honored, by his older brother Emperor Xuanzong, Crown Prince Huixuan). Li Zhirou was descended through the line of Li Ye's descendants that inherited the title of Prince of Xue, including Li Zhirou's great-grandfather Li Quan (李琄), grandfather Li Sui (李邃), and father Li Mi (李宓).

After Li Zhirou inherited the title of Prince of Xue, he served as the minister of imperial clan affairs (宗正卿, Zongzheng Qing). He later served as the mayor of Jingzhao (京兆, i.e., the region of the Tang imperial capital Chang'an). While he was the mayor of Jingzhao, he sifted the long-unusable Zhengguo Canal and Bai Canal (白渠) such that they could be used for irrigation again and was thus much praised by the people of Jingzhao, who wanted to build a monument to commemorate his contributions; he declined. He was later put in charge of the directorates of finances and of the salt and iron monopolies.

== As chancellor ==
In 895, there was an occasion when then-reigning Emperor Zhaozong fled Chang'an into the Qinling Mountains, fearing that the nearby warlords Li Maozhen the military governor (jiedushi) of Fengxiang Circuit (鳳翔, headquartered in modern Baoji, Shaanxi) and Wang Xingyu the military governor of Jingnan Circuit (靜難, headquartered in modern Xianyang, Shaanxi) would seize him. Most of the imperial officials were initially unable to follow him, but Li Zhirou caught up to him. Emperor Zhaozong thus put Li Zhirou in charge of the office of chancellors, effectively making him a chancellor, albeit not with the usual designation Tong Zhongshu Menxia Pingzhangshi (同中書門下平章事). He also put Li Zhirou in charge of comforting the civilians who followed him. Shortly thereafter, after the chancellors Cui Zhaowei, Xu Yanruo, and Wang Tuan arrived, Emperor Zhaozong sent Li Zhirou and the acting director of palace communications, Liu Guangyu (劉光裕), to return to Chang'an to gather up imperial guards to defend the palace. Subsequently, Emperor Zhaozong commissioned Li Zhirou as the military governor of Qinghai Circuit (清海, headquartered in modern Guangzhou, Guangdong), carrying the Tong Zhongshu Menxia Pingzhangshi title as an honorary title, but still let him temporarily act as the mayor of Jingzhao, the director of finances, and the director of salt and iron monopolies, with directions that he should report to Qinghai after the emperor returned to Chang'an. As Emperor Zhaozong was able to return to Chang'an later in the year, with Li Maozhen and Wang Xingyu defeated by Li Keyong the military governor of Hedong Circuit (河東, headquartered in modern Taiyuan, Shanxi), presumably Li Zhirou then embarked on his journey to Qinghai.

== As jiedushi of Qinghai Circuit ==
As Li Zhirou headed for Qinghai, he went through Wu'an Circuit (武安, headquartered in modern Changsha, Hunan) in 896. Instead of preparing to welcome him, however, the Qinghai officers Lu Ju (盧琚) and Tan Hongqi (譚弘玘) instead prepared to resist him and took up defensive positions, with Tan defending Duan Prefecture (端州, in modern Zhaoqing, Guangdong). an tried to enter an alliance with Liu Yin the prefect of Feng Prefecture (封州, in modern Zhaoqing as well) to defend against Li and promised to give his daughter to Liu in marriage. Liu pretended to agree, but instead, under the guise that he was going to go to Duan Prefecture to marry Tan's daughter, ambushed Tan and killed him. He then attacked Qinghai's capital Guang Prefecture (廣州) and killed Lu, and then welcomed Li to Guang Prefecture to take command. Li commissioned Liu as the commander of the Qinghai army.

In 900, then-leading chancellor Cui Yin was showing dislike for fellow chancellor Xu Yanruo for having greater seniority, and Xu, detecting this, resigned the chancellorship and asked to succeed Li at Qinghai (as Li was one of the few military governors remaining who was still obeying imperial orders). Emperor Zhaozong thus commissioned Xu as Qinghai's military governor. Before Xu could reach Qinghai, however, Li died, while still serving at Qinghai.

== Notes and references ==
- New Book of Tang, vol. 81.
- Zizhi Tongjian, vols. 260, 262.
