= Kong Wei =

Chinese official of the Tang dynasty

- Traditional Chinese: 孔緯
- Simplified Chinese: 孔纬
Transcriptions
Standard Mandarin
- Hanyu Pinyin: Kǒng Wěi
- Wade–Giles: K'ung3 Wei3

Huawen
- Chinese: 化文
Transcriptions
Standard Mandarin
- Hanyu Pinyin: Huā Wén
- Wade–Giles: Hua1 Wen2

Duke of Lu
- Traditional Chinese: 魯公
- Simplified Chinese: 鲁公
Transcriptions
Standard Mandarin
- Hanyu Pinyin: Lǔ Gōng
- Wade–Giles: Lu3 Kung1

Kong Wei (孔緯) (died 1 October 895), courtesy name Huawen (化文), formally the Duke of Lu (魯公), was an official of the late Tang dynasty, serving as a chancellor during the reigns of Emperor Xizong and Emperor Xizong's younger brother Emperor Zhaozong.

== Background and early career ==
Kong Wei's family was descended from the Spring and Autumn period philosopher Kong Qiu (Confucius). His great-granduncle Kong Chaofu (孔巢父) was a well-known official during the reign of Emperor Dezong, and his great-grandfather Kong Cenfu (孔岑父) and grandfather Kong Kui (孔戣) also both served as imperial officials. His father Kong Wenru (孔溫孺) served as a county secretary general, but died early. Kong Wei had at least two younger brothers, Kong Jiang (孔絳) and Kong Jian (孔緘).

As Kong Wenru died early, Kong Wei was raised by his uncles Kong Wenyu (孔溫裕) and Kong Wenye (孔溫業). As both Kong Wenyu and Kong Wenye served as regional governors, Kong Wei followed them to their assignments, and due to the friendships that Kong Wenyu and Kong Wenye had, Kong Wei became well known among the imperial officials. He passed the imperial examinations in the Jinshi class in 859, during the reign of Emperor Xuānzong, and therefore served as a copyeditor (校書郎, Xiaoshu Lang) at the Palace Library. When the former chancellor Cui Shenyou served as the military governor (jiedushi) of Dongchuan Circuit (東川, headquartered in modern Mianyang, Sichuan), he invited Kong to serve on his staff. Kong later served on the staff of another former chancellor, Cui Xuan, when Cui Xuan served as the military governor of Huainan Circuit (淮南, headquartered in modern Yangzhou, Jiangsu). He then served under Cui Shenyou again at Hua Prefecture (華州, in modern Weinan, Shaanxi) and then Hezhong Circuit (河中, headquartered in modern Yuncheng, Shanxi). Under the recommendation of the chancellor Yang Shou, Kong was made the sheriff of Chang'an County, one of the two counties making up the Tang dynasty capital Chang'an, and also served as a researcher at Hongwen Pavilion (弘文館). Later, Wang Duo, who was then the deputy chief imperial censor, recommended Kong to be an imperial censor with the title Jiancha Yushi (監察御史), and Kong was then made Libu Yuanwailang (禮部員外郎), a low-level official at the ministry of rites (禮部, Lǐbu). The chancellor Xu Shang then recommended that he be made a scholar at Jixian Hall (集賢院) as well as Kaogong Yuanwailang (考功員外郎), a low-level official at the minister of civil service affairs (吏部, Lìbu, note different tone than the ministry of rites).

Kong later left government service when his mother died, to observe a mourning period. He then returned to the imperial government as Yousi Yuanwailang (右司員外郎), a low-level official under one of the secretaries general of the executive bureau (尚書省, Shangshu Sheng). As the chancellor Zhao Yin was impressed by his writing ability, Zhao recommended him to be an imperial scholar (翰林學士, Hanlin Xueshi), as well as Kaogong Langzhong (考功郎中), a supervisory official at the minister of civil service affairs; he was also put in charge of drafting edicts. Later, he was made Zhongshu Sheren (中書舍人), a mid-level official at the legislative bureau (中書省, Zhongshu Sheng), as well as deputy minister of census (戶部侍郎, Hubu Shilang). In the middle of the Qianfu era (874–879) of Emperor Xuānzong's grandson Emperor Xizong, he was relieved of his post as imperial scholar, and made the deputy chief imperial censor (御史中丞, Yushi Zhongcheng). It was said that because Kong had integrity and hated wickedness, during his service at the office of the imperial censors, the office became more cleanly run. Later, when he served successively as the deputy minister of census, then deputy minister of defense (兵部侍郎, Bingbu Shilang), then deputy minister of civil service affairs (吏部侍郎, Lìbu Shilang), he would refuse special requests by powerful individuals. This offended those who made requests of him, and he was given the largely powerless post of minister of worship (太常卿, Taichang Qing).

In late 880, the major agrarian rebel Huang Chao attacked Chang'an, and Emperor Xizong fled to Chengdu. Kong followed Emperor Xizong there, and was made the minister of justice (刑部尚書, Xingbu Shangshu) and acting director of finances. However, as the chancellor Xiao Gou, who was a colleague of Kong's while both served as imperial scholars, disliked Kong, he accused Kong of mismanagement, and had Kong given the entirely honorary post of advisor to the Crown Prince (as there was no crown prince at the time). In 885, Kong followed Emperor Xizong back to Chang'an after Huang's defeat.

Late that year, the powerful eunuch Tian Lingzi provoked the warlord Wang Chongrong the military governor of Hezhong by ordering Wang transferred, and Wang and his ally Li Keyong the military governor of Hedong Circuit (河東, headquartered in modern Taiyuan, Shanxi) reacted by engaging forces under Tian and Tian's allies Zhu Mei the military governor of Jingnan Circuit (靜難, headquartered in modern Xianyang, Shaanxi) and Li Changfu the military governor of Fengxiang Circuit (鳳翔, headquartered in modern Baoji, Shaanxi). Wang Chongrong's and Li Keyong's forces defeated Tian's, Zhu's, and Li Changfu's forces, and approached Chang'an. As a result, Tian escorted Emperor Xizong to flee to Fengxiang, and then to Xingyuan (興元, in modern Hanzhong, Shaanxi). The imperial officials largely followed Emperor Xizong to Fengxiang, but when he suddenly fled to Xingyuan, few followed (because they were not aware that he had fled further), with Kong and Du Rangneng being among the few who did. Emperor Xizong then commissioned Kong as the chief imperial censor (御史大夫, Yushi Daifu) and ordered him to return to Chang'an and Fengxiang to order the imperial officials to report to Xingyuan. However, when Kong arrived at Fengxiang, the imperial officials — including the chancellors Xiao and Pei Che, who by this point were thoroughly disgusted with Tian's control over the emperor, refused to meet Kong, and even the imperial censors — Kong's subordinates — were finding excuses to refuse to follow him. In anger, Kong stated, "My wife is ill and about to die, and I have left her. If you, gentlemen, are going to care about yourselves this much, this is farewell!" He then met Li Changfu and asked Li Changfu to give him an escort. Li Changfu, impressed, agreed, and had soldiers escort him to Xingyuan.

== First chancellorship ==
After Kong Wei's arrival in Xingyuan, Emperor Xizong made both him and Du Rangneng deputy ministers of defense, as well as chancellors, with the designation Tong Zhongshu Menxia Pingzhangshi (同中書門下平章事). After Emperor Xizong subsequently was able to return to Chang'an after Zhu Mei was killed by his own officer Wang Xingyu (who was promised that if he did so, he could succeed Zhu as military governor of Jingnan), Kong was given the additional post of Zuo Pushe (左僕射, one of the heads of the executive bureau), and was given an iron certificate, guaranteeing that he would not be put to death.

After Emperor Xizong died in 888 and was succeeded by his younger brother Emperor Zhaozong, Kong continued to serve as chancellor, and was further created the Duke of Lu. Around the new year 889, when Emperor Zhaozong was set make sacrifices to heaven, the powerful eunuchs (including Yang Fugong, who was instrumental in Emperor Zhaozong's ascension) wanted to participate in the ceremony. Kong opposed, on account that this was against tradition. Emperor Zhaozong, however, still allowed eunuchs to do so, under Kong's subsequently compromise proposal that the eunuchs be required to wear the uniforms for the non-eunuch office titles that they held, rather than the eunuch titles that they held.

Still, Kong and fellow chancellor Zhang Jun were repeatedly advising Emperor Zhaozong to try to reduce Yang's influence, and Emperor Zhaozong was receptive. Kong went as far as publicly denouncing Yang for plotting treason (for gathering a large group of army officers around himself as adoptive sons, as well as maintaining a private army). Kong also tried to stand against the influence of the warlord Zhu Quanzhong, the military governor of Xuanwu Circuit (宣武, headquartered in modern Kaifeng, Henan), and when Zhu requested the post of director of salt and iron monopolies for himself, Kong refused, stating to Zhu's emissary, "If Lord Zhu wants this post, he would need to use force to obtain it." Zhu thus withdrew the request.

Kong's and Zhang's drive to reduce the eunuchs' and the warlords' power, however, caused them to make an ill-advised recommendation to Emperor Zhaozong in 890, however. As of 890, Zhu, Helian Duo the defender of Yun Prefecture (雲州, in modern Datong, Shanxi), and Li Kuangwei the military governor of Lulong Circuit (盧龍, headquartered in modern Beijing), were all resentful of Li Keyong's efforts to expand his territory, and all three submitted petitions that the imperial government declare Li Keyong a renegade and declare a general campaign against him. When Emperor Zhaozong had the imperial officials discuss this matter, most imperial officials, including Kong's and Zhang's chancellor colleagues Du and Liu Chongwang, opposed. However, Kong and Zhang, believing that this was the time to assert imperial authority over warlords and to try to use a victory to then overpower the eunuchs, were insistent on a campaign against Li Keyong, citing Li Keyong's participation in the campaign that forced Emperor Xizong to flee the capital a second time. Emperor Zhaozong finally agreed, and put Zhang in overall command of the operation. However, despite the participation of forces from many circuits whose military governors resented Li Keyong, including Zhu, Li Kuangwei, Han Jian, Li Maozhen, and Tuoba Sigong, the imperial forces were crushed by Li Keyong, and Zhang fled back to Chang'an. Li Keyong then submitted a petition to Emperor Zhaozong condemning Zhang. To placate Li Keyong, Emperor Zhaozong issued a general pardon for him and his troops and restored his offices. In spring 891, Emperor Zhaozong further removed Kong and Zhang from their chancellor offices, making Kong the military governor of Jingnan Circuit (荊南, headquartered in modern Jingzhou, Hubei, not the same Jingnan Circuit previously ruled by Zhu Mei) and making Zhang the military governor of Wuchang Circuit (武昌, headquartered in modern Wuhan, Hubei).

== Between chancellorships ==
As Kong Wei was departing Chang'an for Jingnan Circuit, Yang Fugong, resentful of Kong, sent his soldiers, disguised as bandits, to intercept Kong just outside Chang'an, damaging Kong's staff and robbing him of his supplies, and it was said that Kong barely escaped with his life. Meanwhile, as Li Keyong was still angry, he submitted another petition against Zhang. Emperor Zhaozong, in order to placate Li Keyong further, ordered Kong and Zhang to be exiled to be prefects at distant prefectures – in Kong's case, the prefect of Jun Prefecture (均州, in modern Shiyan, Hubei). Only then was Li Keyong placated, and he returned to Hedong.

As Zhang was departing for his exile, however, he fled instead to Han Jian, who was then the military governor of Zhenguo Circuit (鎮國, headquartered at Hua Prefecture), and wrote Zhu Quanzhong, asking for him to intercede. Zhu submitted a petition proclaiming Zhang's and Kong's innocence. Emperor Zhaozong acceded to Zhu's request and freed Zhang and Kong from their exile orders, and thereafter, Kong also went to Zhenguo to stay with Han.

== Second chancellorship ==
In 895, with the chancellor Cui Zhaowei conspiring with Li Maozhen, Wang Xingyu, and Han Jian, going as far as having Li, Zhu, and Han march on Chang'an to kill Cui's fellow chancellors and rivals Li Xi and Wei Zhaodu, Emperor Zhaozong, wanting to find chancellors who could stand up to the warlords, and so he recalled Kong Wei and Zhang Jun to Chang'an, intending to make them chancellors again. At that time, Kong was ill, but forced himself to get to Chang'an, to personally meet Emperor Zhaozong to decline. Emperor Zhaozong refused and made him chancellor anyway. (Emperor Zhaozong cancelled his plan to make Zhang chancellor again, however, after Li Keyong vehemently objected.)

Meanwhile, in reaction to the killing of Li Xi and Wei Zhaodu by Li Maozhen, Wang, and Han, Li Keyong started a campaign against them and approached Chang'an. In response, Li Maozhen's adoptive son, the imperial guard officer Li Jipeng (李繼鵬), as well as the eunuch Luo Quanguan (駱全瓘), plotted to seize Emperor Zhaozong and take him to Fengxiang (where Li Maozhen was military governor), while another eunuch, Liu Jingxuan (劉景宣), and Wang Xingyu's brother Wang Xingshi (王行實), plotted to seize Emperor Zhaozong and take him to Jingnan. In fear, Emperor Zhaozong, under the protection of the imperial guard general Li Yun (李筠), fled toward the Qinling Mountains. Kong followed, but when the imperial train reached Shacheng (莎城, in modern Xi'an, Shaanxi), Kong fell seriously ill, and he returned to Chang'an. He died shortly after, and was given posthumous honors.

== Notes and references ==
- Old Book of Tang, vol. 179.
- New Book of Tang, vol. 163.
- Zizhi Tongjian, vols. 256, 258, 260.
