= Du Xiao =

Du Xiao (杜曉) (died March 27, 913), courtesy name Mingyuan (明遠), was an official of the Chinese Tang dynasty and Later Liang, serving as a chancellor during Later Liang.

== During the Tang dynasty ==
It is not known when Du Xiao was born. Both his grandfather Du Shenquan and father Du Rangneng served as chancellors during Tang dynasty — Du Shenquen during the reign of Emperor Yizong, and Du Rangneng during the reigns of Emperor Yizong's sons Emperor Xizong and Emperor Zhaozong. Du Rangneng was a close confidant of Emperor Zhaozong's. In 893, after Emperor Zhaozong's failed campaign against the warlords Wang Xingyu the military governor of Jingnan Circuit (靜難, headquartered in modern Xianyang, Shaanxi) and Li Maozhen the military governor of Fengxiang Circuit (鳳翔, headquartered in modern Baoji, Shaanxi) — a campaign that Du Rangneng had coordinated after Emperor Zhaozong ordered him to even though he was against the campaign — Wang and Li marched on the imperial capital Chang'an; under duress from them, Emperor Zhaozong was forced to order Du Rangneng to commit suicide.

After Du Rangneng's death, Du Xiao mourned him bitterly, and even after the traditional three-year mourning period, he still partially wore mourning clothes for over a decade and did not embark on an official career. His older brother Du Guang'ai (杜光乂) was suffering from a mental illness, such that at times he would act out violently or speak angrily, but despite this, Du Xiao served him humbly as an older brother. During Emperor Zhaozong's Guanghua era (898-901), when the chancellor Cui Yin served also as the director of salt and iron monopolies, Cui offered him a number of positions in the imperial government — as an assistant to Cui as the director of the monopolies; as a Xiaoshulang (校書郎), a copyeditor at the Palace Library; a county sheriff near Chang'an; and a scholar at Hongwen Pavilion (弘文館); he declined them all. Later, after Emperor Zhaozong was forced by the warlord Zhu Quanzhong the military governor of Xuanwu Circuit (宣武, headquartered in modern Kaifeng, Henan) to move to Luoyang, the chancellor Cui Yuan, who was then also serving as the director of taxation, offered him the posts of assistant to Cui as director of taxation and the deputy director of palace affairs (殿中丞, Dianzhong Cheng). Cui spoke to him to persuade him to accept:

When Ji Kang was poisoned to death, his son Ji Shao initially hid himself and did not display himself. Shan Tao persuaded him with reason, and therefore he served as an official. Young man, do you have the heart to hide yourself such that, when the Dus are to offer ancestral offerings, they would be forced to use the ceremonies of commoners?

Du Xiao therefore agreed to accept the posts. Shortly after, he was made Zuo Shiyi (左拾遺), an advisory official at the examination bureau (門下省, Menxia Sheng), and soon was made an imperial scholar (翰林學士, Hanlin Xueshi) and Shanbu Yuanwailang (膳部員外郎), a low-level official at the ministry of rites (禮部, Libu). After Cui himself was removed (and later killed) by Zhu in 905, Du lost his position as imperial scholar and was only serving as Shanbu Yuanwailang. Several months later, however, he was given the responsibility of drafting imperial edicts, and was then given back his position as imperial scholar, and promoted to a supervisory position as Shanbu Langzhong (膳部郎中).

== During Later Liang ==
In 907, Zhu Quanzhong had Emperor Zhaozong's son and successor Emperor Ai yield the throne to him, ending Tang and starting a new Later Liang as its Emperor Taizu. Du Xiao was made Zhongshu Sheren (中書舍人), a mid-level official at the legislative bureau (中書省, Zhongshu Sheng) and continued to serve as an imperial scholar. In 909, he was made the deputy minister of public works (工部侍郎, Gongbu Shilang) and chief imperial scholar (翰林學士承旨, Hanlin Xueshi Chengzhi). That fall, he was made a chancellor with the designation Tong Zhongshu Menxia Pingzhangshi (同中書門下平章事), as well as the deputy minister of census (戶部侍郎, Hubu Shilang).

In 912, Emperor Taizu was assassinated by his son Zhu Yougui the Prince of Ying, who took the throne himself. Zhu Yougui retained Du as a chancellor and gave him additional titles minister of rites (禮部尚書, Libu Shangshu) and grand scholar at Jixian Hall (集賢殿). In 913, Emperor Taizu's nephew, the general Yuan Xiangxian, who was working in league with Emperor Taizu's son-in-law Zhao Yan and son Zhu Youzhen the Prince of Jun, rose against Zhu Yougui and attacked the palace. Zhu Yougui committed suicide. After Zhu Yougui's death, the imperial guards began to pillage Luoyang. During the confusion, Du Xiao was wounded by the soldiers and died from his injuries. After Zhu Youzhen subsequently took the throne, he gave Du posthumous honors.

== Notes and references ==
- History of the Five Dynasties, vol. 18.
- New History of the Five Dynasties, vol. 35.
- Zizhi Tongjian, vols. 267, 268.
