= Sun Wo =

Sun Wo (Chinese: 孫偓), courtesy name Longguang (龍光), formally the Marquess of Le'an (樂安侯), was an official of the Chinese Tang dynasty, serving as a chancellor from 895 to 897 during the reign of Emperor Zhaozong.

== Background ==
It is not known when Sun Wo was born. His family claimed to be descended from the ruling house of the Zhou dynasty state Wey, from which a branch became the ruling house of the Three Kingdoms period state Eastern Wu, although Sun Wo was not from that branch. Sun Wo's traceable ancestors included officials of the Han dynasty, Cao Wei, Jin dynasty (266–420), Later Zhao, Later Yan, Northern Yan, Northern Wei, Sui dynasty, and Tang dynasty. Sun Wo's grandfather Sun Qi (孫起) served as a county magistrate, while his father Sun Jingshang (孫景商) served as the military governor (Jiedushi) of Tianping Circuit (天平, headquartered in modern Tai'an, Shandong). Sun Wo had at least four older brothers—Sun Bei (孫備), Sun Chu (孫儲), Sun Pi (孫伾), and Sun Jian (孫儉)—and two younger brothers—Sun Gang (孫伉) and Sun Yi (孫佾)—who also served as Tang officials. (Because one of Sun Wo's ancestors, Sun Yi (孫顗), who lived during the Jin dynasty, moved his family to Wuyi (武邑, in modern Hengshui, Hebei), Sun Wo was referred in historical accounts as "from Wuyi," although it is unclear whether he actually lived there.) At some point, Sun Wo passed the imperial examinations in the Jinshi (進士) class, and served in a number of prominent offices—although the list is lost to history.

== As chancellor ==
In late 895—during a campaign featuring the imperial government, under Emperor Zhaozong, and Li Keyong the military governor of Hedong Circuit (河東, headquartered in modern Taiyuan, Shanxi) on one side, and Li Maozhen the military governor of Fengxiang Circuit (鳳翔, headquartered in modern Baoji, Shaanxi) and Wang Xingyu the military governor of Jingnan Circuit (靜難, headquartered in modern Xianyang, Shaanxi) on the other—Emperor Zhaozong made Sun Wo, who was then the mayor of Jingzhao Municipality (京兆, i.e., the region of the imperial capital Chang'an) the deputy minister of defense (兵部侍郎, Bingbu Shilang) and chancellor with the designation Tong Zhongshu Menxia Pingzhangshi (同中書門下平章事). (Sun's subsequent involvement in the campaign, if any, is not recorded in history.) Later in the year, shortly after a chancellor, Cui Zhaowei, was executed for conspiring with Li Maozhen and Wang. By the end of the year, Li Keyong had defeated Wang, who was then killed by his own subordinates in flight. Li Maozhen and another ally, Han Jian the military governor of Zhenguo Circuit (鎮國, headquartered in modern Weinan, Shaanxi), then outwardly submitted to the imperial government. Emperor Zhaozong therefore ordered Li Keyong to end the campaign and return to Hedong. At some point, Sun was created the Marquess of Le'an.

However, by summer 896, the relationship between the imperial government and Li Maozhen had broken down again, and Li Maozhen launched his army to threaten Chang'an. Emperor Zhaozong and the imperial officials decided to flee Chang'an, initially resolving to head to Hedong. However, due to the distance involved and due to Han's avowal of his loyalty, Emperor Zhaozong headed for Han's capital Hua Prefecture (華州) instead. While there, he declared a general campaign against Li Maozhen, putting Sun in charge of the campaign and making the general Li Sijian (李思諫) Sun's deputy. However, with Han having a long-time alliance with Li Maozhen, Han interfered with the operation, which, as a result, was never actually launched. By 897, with Han having seized control of the imperial guards that Emperor Zhaozong had previously put several imperial princes in command of, the campaign was cancelled entirely.

Soon thereafter, Han falsely accused two close associates of Emperor Zhaozong's—the astronomer Ma Daoyin (馬道殷) and the physician Xu Yanshi (許巖士) of crimes and had them executed. With another chancellor, Zhu Pu, being regarded as sheerly incompetent, Han further accused Sun and Zhu of associating with Ma and Xu. As a result, both Sun and Zhu were removed from their chancellor posts, with Sun initially keeping his secondary post as the minister of rites (禮部尚書, Libu Shangshu). Later in the year, Sun was demoted and exiled to be the military advisor to the prefect of Nan Prefecture (南州, in modern Chongqing). He died in exile, with the date of his death lost to history.

As chancellor, Sun was described to be understanding and frugal. He paid little attention to his outward appearance, once stating, "A gentleman has proper ways to act. One needs not compare his appearance to the appearance to another's; rather, he should act in clear ways so as to contrast with another's murky ways." It was said that whenever he had guests, if his servants had arguments among themselves, he would not rebuke them—stating that if he took time to rebuke them, he would merely be distracting himself.

== Notes and references ==
- New Book of Tang, vol. 183.
- Zizhi Tongjian, vols. 260, 261.
