= Zhang Jun (Tang chancellor) =

Zhang Jun (張濬) (died January 20, 904), courtesy name Yuchuan (禹川), was an official of the Chinese dynasty Tang dynasty, serving as a chancellor during the reigns of Emperor Xizong and Emperor Xizong's younger brother and successor Emperor Zhaozong. Early in Emperor Zhaozong's reign, Zhang was a major advocate for the imperial campaign to regain power from the regional warlords, but was removed after commanding a disastrous campaign against warlord Li Keyong and forced into retirement. Late in Emperor Zhaozong's reign, with Emperor Zhaozong physically controlled by another warlord, Zhu Quanzhong, who had designs on taking over the throne as emperor (and eventually did, founding Later Liang), Zhu, while formerly an ally of Zhang's, was concerned that Zhang would encourage other warlords into a coordinated campaign against Zhu to stop his takeover, and so had his ally Zhang Quanyi slaughter Zhang Jun and his household.

== Early life ==
It is not known when Zhang Jun was born. His family was originally from Hejian (河間, in modern Cangzhou, Hebei) and claimed ancestry from Zhang Er (張耳), an ally of Han dynasty's founder Emperor Gao during the Chu–Han contention, who carried the title of Prince of Zhao in the early Han times, but his traceable ancestry only went back to the Northern Zhou official Zhang Xian (張羨), who was bestowed the Xianbei surname of Chiluo (叱羅), but whose son Zhang Zhao (張照) later reverted to the surname of Zhang during Northern Zhou's succeeding dynasty Sui dynasty. Zhang Zhao's descendants served Sui and Tang dynasty. Zhang Jun's grandfather Zhang Zhongsu (張仲素) served as a Zhongshu Sheren, a mid-level official at the legislative bureau of government (中書省, Zhongshu Sheng), but his father Zhang Duo (張鐸) either did not serve in the imperial government at all, or served in a very minor office. He had at least two younger brothers, Zhang Yong (張泳) and Zhang Hang (張沆).

It was said that Zhang Jun had an open and careless personally. He studied literature and history extensively, and often spoke in grand terms; because of that latter characteristic, the well-learned did not have good opinions of him. As a result of his poor reputation, he was not initially able to start an official career, and he became a hermit at Mount Jinfeng (金鳳山) and the time studying strategies left by Guiguzi, hoping to use those strategies during troubled times.

== Early career ==
During Zhang Jun's time as a hermit, he met the eunuch Yang Fugong, the director of palace communications, and Yang recommended Zhang to be Taichang Boshi (太常博士), a scholar at the ministry of worship (太常寺, Taichang Si). Zhang was subsequently made Duzhi Yuanwailang (度支員外郎), a low-level official at the ministry of census (戶部, Hubu).

In 880, as the major agrarian rebel Huang Chao approached the Tang capital Chang'an, Zhang claimed to be ill, and he took his mother and his family to take refuge at Shang Prefecture (商州, in modern Shangluo, Shaanxi). When Huang subsequently attacked Chang'an, the powerful eunuch Tian Lingzi took then-reigning Emperor Xizong and fled toward Chengdu, where Tian's brother Chen Jingxuan served as the military governor (Jiedushi) of Xichuan Circuit (西川). Meanwhile, while Emperor Xizong was fleeing through Xingyuan (興元, in modern Hanzhong, Shaanxi), his train was running out of food supplies. Li Kang (李康) the magistrate of Hanyin County (漢陰, in modern Ankang, Shaanxi) met the emperor, with several hundred mules bearing food, to supply the emperor. When Emperor Xizong asked how Li Kang, as a mere county magistrate, could think of this, Li Kang credited Zhang for reminding him. Thereafter, Emperor Xizong summoned Zhang to his presence and made him Bingbu Langzhong (兵部郎中, Bingbu Langzhong). Zhang thereafter ingratiated himself with Tian as well, including prostrating himself before Tian, but embarrassed himself on one occasion when Tian pointed this out in public. This also offended Yang, as he and Tian were rivals, particularly because Zhang, after ingratiating Tian, was no longer paying attention to Yang.

Meanwhile, by 882, the chancellor Wang Duo was put in overall command of the operations against Huang Chao, and he went to Yicheng Circuit (義成, headquartered in modern Anyang, Henan) to oversee the operations. Zhang accompanied Wang and served on his staff. At that time, Wang Jingwu, who controlled Pinglu Circuit (平盧, headquartered in modern Weifang, Shandong), had accepted offices bestowed by Huang (who had declared himself the emperor of a new state of Qi), and when Wang Duo sent Zhang to Pinglu to try to persuade Wang Jingwu to join the imperial forces against Huang, Wang Jingwu initially refused to meet Zhang. Zhang rebuked Wang Jingwu, and Wang Jingwu subsequently allowed him to address the soldiers; Zhang then argued to the soldiers that the imperial forces would soon defeat Huang, and it was time for them to earn honors with achievements. With the soldiers agreeing with Zhang, Wang Jingwu rejoined the Tang cause and sent forces to aid in the operations against Huang. After Huang was defeated and Emperor Xizong returned to Chang'an, Zhang was made the deputy minister of census (戶部侍郎, Hubu Shilang). In 887, he was made the deputy minister of defense (兵部侍郎, Bingbu Shilang) and chancellor de facto with the designation Tong Zhongshu Menxia Pingzhangshi (同中書門下平章事). (When the edict announcing this commission reached the warlord Li Keyong the military governor of Hedong Circuit (河東, headquartered in modern Taiyuan, Shanxi), Li Keyong, who was unimpressed with Zhang, stated, "Lord Zhang likes to talk but has no real abilities, and he is someone who can overturn the empire. The emperor decided to use him because of his reputation, but one day he will surely disturb the empire." After Zhang heard of these remarks, he bore a grudge against Li Keyong.)

== Chancellorship ==
Zhang Jun continued to serve as chancellor after Emperor Xizong died in 888 and was succeeded by his brother Emperor Zhaozong, who was supported by Yang Fugong. However, after Emperor Zhaozong became emperor, both Zhang and fellow chancellor Kong Wei advocated a suppression of eunuch power. Emperor Zhaozong agreed, and, as he knew that Yang resented Zhang, trusted Zhang further with his plans of suppressing Yang's power. Zhang often compared himself to the great Jin dynasty (266–420) Xie An and the great Tang chancellor Pei Du. Further, under Zhang's advocacy that the imperial government needed an army of its own, Emperor Zhaozong created an imperial army drawn from the people from Chang'an region, of some 100,000 strong.

In 890, after Li Keyong failed in his campaign to attack Helian Duo the defender of Yun Prefecture (雲州, in modern Datong, Shanxi), Helian, Li Keyong's main rival Zhu Quanzhong the military governor of Xuanwu Circuit (宣武, headquartered in modern Kaifeng, Henan), and Li Kuangwei the military governor of Lulong Circuit (盧龍, headquartered in modern Beijing), all submitted petitions to Emperor Zhaozong asking him to declare Li Keyong a renegade and declare a general campaign against Li Keyong. When Emperor Zhaozong requested opinions from imperial officials, most opposed, including the chancellors Du Rangneng and Liu Chongwang, but Zhang and Kong, who wanted to try to use this as an opportunity to reassert imperial power, advocated for the campaign against Li Keyong and to then use that power to suppress the eunuchs, strenuously advocated for the campaign. Emperor Zhaozong, despite misgivings, agreed, and he put Zhang in overall command of the operations, assisted by the official Sun Kui (孫揆). As Zhang was leaving, he privately stated to Emperor Zhaozong, "Let me first eliminate the external threat for Your Imperial Majesty, and then eliminate the internal threat." These words nevertheless became known to Yang, who became apprehensive of Zhang. Further, when Yang held a feast for Zhang to send him off, Zhang refused to drink when Yang offered wine. Yang sarcastically stated, "Lord Chancellor, you are holding the imperial sword. Why are you so hesitant?" Zhang responded, "Let me first destroy the bandits, and they you will see why I am hesitant." This aggravated Yang further, and he thereafter tried to hinder the campaign.

Initially, the imperial government appeared to have the upper hand, as Zhang's imperial army was supplemented by armies sent by Zhenguo (鎮國, headquartered in modern Weinan, Shaanxi), Jingnan (靜難, headquartered in modern Xianyang, Shaanxi), Fengxiang (鳳翔, headquartered in modern Baojing, Shaanxi), Baoda (保大, headquartered in modern Yan'an, Shaanxi), and Dingnan (定難, headquartered in modern Yulin, Shaanxi) Circuits, including Zhenguo's military governor Han Jian. Zhu was also attacking Li Keyong's domain from the southeast, and Helian and Li Kuangwei from the northeast. Further, just as Zhang's army was launched, Li Keyong's brother Li Kegong (李克恭) the military governor of Zhaoyi Circuit (昭義, headquartered in modern Changzhi, Shanxi), was assassinated by his own officer An Jushou (安居受), who in turn was killed by another officer, Feng Ba (馮霸), who surrendered the circuit capital Lu Prefecture (潞州) to Zhu Quanzhong's officer Zhu Chongjie (朱崇節). Hearing the news, Emperor Zhaozong and Zhang, not wanting Zhaoyi to fall into Zhu Quanzhong's hands, commissioned Sun as the military governor of Zhaoyi and ordered him to report to Zhaoyi immediately.

As Sun was advancing to Lu Prefecture, however, he took few precautions against a surprise attack. Li Keyong's adoptive son Li Cunxiao made a surprise attack on Sun's procession, capturing him. (When Sun subsequently would not submit to Li Keyong, Li Keyong killed him.) This demoralized the imperial army, and subsequently, with Li Cunxiao putting Lu Prefecture under siege, the Xuanwu forces withdrew from Zhaoyi. Meanwhile, Li Keyong's other adoptive sons Li Cunxin and Li Siyuan defeated Li Kuangwei and Helian, forcing them to withdraw as well, leaving Zhang's forces alone against Li Keyong himself.

The imperial forces engaged Li Keyong's at Fen Prefecture (汾州, in modern Lüliang, Shanxi). Han tried to take the initiative by making a surprise night attack on Li Cunxiao, but Li Cunxiao took precautions, and Han's attack was not successful. Thereafter, without battling, the Jingnan and Fengxiang forces suddenly disengaged and left the imperial camp. The imperial forces, demoralized, collapsed. The Hedong forces gave chase, catching Zhang at Jin Prefecture (晉州, in modern Linfen, Shanxi). Zhang tried to engage Hedong forces, but was again defeated. After this defeat, the Baoda and Dingnan forces also fled, leaving Zhang's own imperial forces, along with Han's Zhenguo forces and some Xuanwu forces sent by Zhu Quanzhong. Zhang defended Jin Prefecture, and Li Cunxiao put it under siege. After three days, Li Cunxiao decided that no benefit could come from capturing a chancellor and slaughtering imperial forces, and therefore lifted the siege to allow Zhang and Han to flee, and they did so. As they did, it was said that the imperial army, in effect, disintegrated.

Li Keyong submitted harshly-worded petitions to Emperor Zhaozong, outwardly offering to submit himself to judicial proceedings, but clearly accusing Zhang of wrongly attacking him. Emperor Zhaozong tried to placate Li Keyong by demoting Zhang to be the military governor of Wuchang Circuit (武昌, headquartered in modern Wuhan, Hubei), and Kong to be the military governor of Jingnan Circuit (荊南, headquartered in modern Jingzhou, Hubei, not the same circuit that initially joined the imperial cause against Li Keyong), and restoring Li Keyong's titles. When that failed to placate Li Keyong, Emperor Zhaozong further exiled both Zhang and Kong—in Zhang's case, to be the prefect of Lian Prefecture (連州, in modern Qingyuan, Shandong), and then to be the census officer at Xiu Prefecture (繡州, in modern Guigang, Guangxi).

== First retirement ==
Zhang Jun set off to his place of exile, but just after he left Chang'an, when he got to Lantian (藍田, in modern Xi'an, Shaanxi), he fled from his escorts, to Han Jian's headquarters at Hua Prefecture (華州), and both he and Kong Wei wrote to Zhu Quanzhong to ask him to plead for them. Zhu thereafter submitted a petition to plead their case. Emperor Zhaozong decided thereafter to release them from their exile orders, and both Zhang and Kong thereafter resided at Hua Prefecture with Han.

== Return to imperial government ==
In 895, after Li Maozhen the military governor of Fengxiang, Wang Xingyu the military governor of Jingnan, and Han Jian, at the instigation of the chancellor Cui Zhaowei, marched on Chang'an to demand the deaths of the former chancellors Li Xi and Wei Zhaodu (and, when Emperor Zhaozong refused, put Li Xi and Wei to death themselves), Emperor Zhaozong wanted to find chancellors who were willing to stand up to the warlords. He thus summoned Zhang Jun, who was then no longer at Hua Prefecture but residing at his vacation estate in Changshui (長水, in modern Luoyang, Henan), and Kong Wei to the capital, initially giving them the honorary post of advisor to the Crown Prince Li Yu, Prince of De, and then making Kong chancellor, while making Zhang the minister of defense (兵部尚書) and the director of circuit commerce. Li Keyong subsequently came to Emperor Zhaozong's defense, attacked and killed Wang Xingyu, but at Emperor Zhaozong's orders did not attack Li Maozhen or Han, as he had initially wanted to. In early 896, when Zhu Quanzhong submitted a petition recommending Zhang to be chancellor again, Li Keyong reacted by submitting a petition to ask for a campaign against Zhu, and further stating, "If Zhang Jun were made chancellor in the morning, I will arrive at the palace in the evening!" Emperor Zhaozong thus did not make Zhang chancellor.

Later in 896, after Li Maozhen attacked Chang'an again (after a failed campaign by Emperor Zhaozong against him), Emperor Zhaozong fled to Hua Prefecture, and thereafter was under Han's control. Zhang, who followed Emperor Zhaozong to Hua Prefecture, was relieved of his post as the director of circuit commerce, and thereafter was made You Pushe (右僕射), one of the heads of the executive bureau (尚書省, Shangshu Sheng). He then sought retirement, and was allowed to retire with the higher title of Zuo Pushe (左僕射). He returned to Changshui.

== Second retirement ==
Late in 900, the eunuchs Liu Jishu, Wang Zhongxian (王仲先), Wang Yanfan (王彥範), and Xue Qiwo (薛齊偓), in reaction to Emperor Zhaozong's killing several eunuchs and ladies in waiting in an alcohol-driven rage, forced him to abdicate to Li Yu. When this occurred, Zhang Jun went to meet Zhang Quanyi the military governor of Youguo Circuit (佑國, headquartered in modern Luoyang) to urge him to start a campaign to restore Emperor Zhaozong, and Zhang Jun further wrote to many circuit governors urging the same. (However, early in 901, the Shence Army officers Sun Dezhao (孫德昭), Dong Yanbi (董彥弼), and Zhou Chenghui (周承誨), at the urging of the chancellor Cui Yin, made a surprise countercoup, killing the eunuchs who removed Emperor Zhaozong and restoring him, without further military campaign by the military governors.)

Subsequent to his restoration, Emperor Zhaozong had a brief rapprochement with Li Maozhen, even creating Li Maozhen the Prince of Qi. However, by late 901, Li Maozhen was working with the eunuchs Han Quanhui and Zhang Yanhong (張彥弘) and trying to control Emperor Zhaozong, and in conflict with Cui, who wanted Emperor Zhaozong to slaughter the eunuchs. Cui, in fear that the eunuchs would act against him, wrote to Zhu Quanzhong and asked him to bring an army to support his proposal to slaughter the eunuchs. Upon Zhu's launching of his army, Han and Zhang Yanhong seized Emperor Zhaozong and took him to Fengxiang. Zhu then put Fengxiang under siege — a siege that lasted well into 903, causing the food supplies to run out in Fengxiang and starvation among its population. (As Zhu went to siege Fengxiang, under Zhang Jun's advice, he seized Han Jian's Zhenguo Circuit and transferred Han Jian to Zhongwu Circuit (忠武, headquartered in modern Xuchang, Henan), as Zhang Jun pointed out that Han was a long-time ally of Li Maozhen's.)

As Zhu continued to siege Fengxiang, Han Quanhui sent messengers to many circuits, claiming that Zhu's intent was to act against the emperor and urging them to come to the emperor's rescue. (As a part of Han's maneuvers, Zhang Jun's son Zhang Bo, who was given the imperial surname of Li and a new name of Yan, was sent to Yang Xingmi the military governor of Huainan Circuit (淮南, headquartered in modern Yangzhou, Jiangsu), as an imperial emissary, to urge Yang to launch his forces, although Yang only made minor attempts to attack Zhu's flank thereafter.) Wang Jingwu's son and successor Wang Shifan, who had long been a Zhu ally, who was also urged by Zhang Jun to act, decided to do so. Wang thus sent covert operatives to many cities under Zhu's control, planning to start riots against Zhu, while rising himself at Pinglu against Zhu. Wang's campaign, however, was ultimately not successful, despite minor support from Li Keyong and Yang, and he was forced to resubmit to Zhu, who by this point had forced Li Maozhen to surrender Emperor Zhaozong to him, to be returned to Chang'an, and who subsequently had the emperor firmly under his control.

Rumors that Zhang was involved in Wang's campaign against him, however, caused Zhu to be apprehensive of Zhang, as he was planning to eventually usurp the Tang throne and establish his own dynasty. He feared that, if he did so, Zhang would again urge the other military governors to act against him. He therefore ordered Zhang Quanyi to act against Zhang Jun. Around the new year 904, Zhang Quanyi sent his officer Yang Lin (楊麟) to Changshui dressed as bandits, ready to slaughter Zhang Jun and his household and blame the incident on banditry. A deputy sheriff at Yongning County (永寧, in modern Luoyang as well), Ye Yan (葉彥), whom Zhang Jun had treated well before, found out about this, and went to meet Zhang Jun's son Zhang Ge, stating, "The Lord Chancellor cannot escape this disaster, but you, master, should make a different plan!" Zhang Jun then stated to Zhang Ge, "If you remain here, you will just die with us. If you flee, the family seeds can continue." Zhang Ge, after a tearful farewell, left with Ye, who took 30 men sworn to protect Zhang Ge, and escorted him as far as the Han River, and Zhang Ge subsequently fled to Xichuan. Meanwhile, Yang's men arrived, surrounded Zhang Jun's vacation estate, and slaughtered the entire household. Zhang Ge would subsequently serve as a chancellor under Wang Jian, who established Former Shu after Zhu usurped the Tang throne and established Later Liang, and Wang Jian's son and successor Wang Zongyan. Li Yan would remain at Huainan after Yang's death and Tang's destruction, until he was killed by Xu Wen in 918.

== Notes and references ==
- Old Book of Tang, vol. 179.
- New Book of Tang, vol. 185.
- Zizhi Tongjian, vols. 254, 255, 257, 258, 260, 262, 263, 264.
