= Zheng Qi =

Tang Chinese official

Zheng Qi (Chinese: 鄭綮; died 899), courtesy name Yunwu (蘊武), was an official of the Chinese Tang dynasty, serving briefly as chancellor in 894 during the reign of Emperor Zhaozong. He was known for writing poems filled with puns (xiehouyu) that satirized the political scene that impressed Emperor Zhaozong, leading to his brief term as chancellor despite his own misgivings.

== Background ==
Little is known about Zheng Qi's background, as his family was not included in the table of the chancellors' family trees in the New Book of Tang. After he passed the imperial examinations, he initially served as an imperial censor with the title Jiancha Yushi (監察御史) then as Dianzhong Shi Yushi (殿中侍御史). He then served as a low-level official at the ministry of census (戶部, Hubu), initially as Cangbu Yuanwailang (倉部員外郎) then as Hubu Yuanwailang (戶部員外郎). He then served as a supervisory official at the ministry of census as Jinbu Langzhong (金部郎中), then at the ministry of justice (刑部, Xingbu) as Xingbu Langzhong (刑部郎中), then at the executive bureau of government (尚書省, Shangshu Sheng) as Yousi Langzhong (右司郎中).

Although these posts carried prestige as imperial official posts, they lacked sufficient salary, and Zheng, because his family was poor, sought an assignment out of the capital Chang'an, and thereafter was made the prefect of Lu Prefecture (廬州, in modern Hefei, Anhui). As the major agrarian rebel Huang Chao advanced north in 880, Zheng wrote him a declaration ordering him not to invade Lu Prefecture — a declaration that amused Huang who thereafter skipped past Lu Prefecture. When Zheng later left the post as prefect, he had accumulated some savings, but he left in the care of the prefectural treasury, which was not plundered even later when other agrarian rebels overran Lu Prefecture. Yet later, when Yang Xingmi served as the prefect, he had messengers deliver the money to Zheng.

Zheng was good at writing poetry, and particularly became known for writing poetry that did not strictly comply with metric requirements and which focused on satirizing contemporary events. The format became known as the "Xiehou style of the Fifth Zheng." (The fact that he referred to himself and was referred to others as the Fifth Zheng probably indicated that he was ranked fifth among his brothers.)

When the imperial official Wang Hui served as the chief imperial censor, he recommended Zheng to serve as Bingbu Langzhong (兵部郎中), a supervisory official at the ministry of defense (兵部, Bingbu), and also oversee the administration of the office of the censors (御史臺, Yushi Tai). He later served as imperial attendant (給事中, Jishizhong). When Emperor Xizong was set to commission Du Honghui (杜弘徽), the younger brother of the chancellor Du Rangneng, as a Zhongshu Sheren (中書舍人, mid-level official at the legislative bureau (中書省, Zhongshu Sheng)), Zheng, in his duty of reviewing edicts, sealed and returned the edict to the emperor, arguing that it was inappropriate for one brother to oversee another (the chancellors had overall supervisory authority over the legislative bureau). Emperor Xizong took no action on Zheng's objection, so Zheng claimed an illness and resigned his post.

Soon thereafter, Zheng was recalled to the imperial government to serve as Zuo Sanqi Changshi (左散騎常侍), a high-level advisory official at the examination bureau (門下省, Menxia Sheng). It was said that he submitted many suggestions whenever he saw a problem with imperial governance. Not many of his suggestions were accepted, but they became publicly known at the capital. The ruling officials disliked this phenomenon and made him the principal of the imperial university (國子祭酒, Guozi Jijiu). When this assignment was announced, the public believed that Zheng was moved because he was being honest. The ruling officials became fearful of the consequences and made him Zuo Sanqi Changshi again.

== Chancellorship and after chancellorship ==
Emperor Xizong's brother and successor Emperor Zhaozong eventually became aware of Zheng Qi's poems, as eunuchs recited them in their spare time. Emperor Zhaozong saw their biting satire and believed that they showed hidden talent. In 894, he issued an edict making Zheng the deputy minister of rites (禮部侍郎, Libu Shilang) and a chancellor with the designation Tong Zhongshu Menxia Pingzhangshi (同中書門下平章事). When Zheng's assistants reported this to Zheng to congratulate him, Zheng himself did not take it seriously and stated, "Gentlemen, you must have erred. Even if no one else under heaven knew how to read, the Fifth Zheng cannot be a chancellor." When the assistants insisted that this was the will of the emperor, he stated, "If this is true, people will laugh to death." When the edict announcing his chancellorship arrived the next day, along with congratulating guests, Zheng was confounded, stating to himself, "If the Fifth Zheng, the xiehou writer, becomes chancellor, what does this say about the current state of governance?" He submitted several petitions declining the commission, but the emperor took no heed of them, so he felt compelled to report to his post as a chancellor.

It was said that after Zheng became a chancellor, he took his responsibilities seriously and was no longer spending his time in humorous speech. However, he still felt that he was not a chancellor who met the expectation of the people. After serving as a chancellor for three months, he resigned and was allowed to retire as an advisor to the Crown Prince. He died in 899.

== Notes and references ==
- Old Book of Tang, vol. 179.
- New Book of Tang, vol. 183.
- Zizhi Tongjian, vol. 259.
