= Du Rangneng =

Imperial official of the Chinese Tang dynasty

Du Rangneng (杜讓能) (841–893), courtesy name Qunyi (群懿), formally the Duke of Jin (晉公), was a former jiedushi of the late Tang dynasty, serving as a chancellor during the reigns of Emperor Xizong and Emperor Xizong's brother Emperor Zhaozong. Early in Emperor Zhaozong's reign, against Du's recommendations, Emperor Zhaozong planned a campaign against the warlord Li Maozhen and put Du in charge of the campaign. After Li subsequently defeated the imperial forces, he marched on the capital Chang'an and demanded Du's death, and Emperor Zhaozong was forced to order Du to commit suicide.

== Background ==
Du Rangneng was born in 841, during the reign of Emperor Wuzong. He was a descendant of the early Tang dynasty chancellor Du Ruhui. His father Du Shenquan served as a chancellor early in the reign of Emperor Wuzong's cousin Emperor Yizong.

== Early career ==
Du Rangneng himself passed the imperial examinations in 872, late in Emperor Yizong's reign. He thereafter served as the sheriff of Xianyang County (咸陽, in modern Xianyang, Shaanxi). When the former chancellor Wang Duo served as the military governor (jiedushi) of Xuanwu Circuit (宣武, headquartered in modern Kaifeng, Henan), he invited Du to serve on his staff. Subsequently, by which time Emperor Yizong's son Emperor Xizong was emperor, Du was recalled to the capital Chang'an to serve as the sheriff of Chang'an County, one of the two counties making up Chang'an, as well as an assistant at Jixian Institute (集賢院). Sometime later, when his mother died, he left governmental service to observe a mourning period for her. After the end of the mourning period, he served on the staff of the former chancellor Liu Ye while Liu served as the military governor of Huainan Circuit (淮南, headquartered in modern Yangzhou, Jiangsu). He was later recalled to Chang'an to serve as an imperial censor with the title Jiancha Yushi (監察御史). Subsequently, when Niu Wei (牛蔚) served as the military governor of Shannan West Circuit (山南西道, headquartered in modern Hanzhong, Shaanxi), Du served on his staff.

Du subsequently was recalled to Chang'an, and he went through a progression of offices: You Bujue (右補闕), a low-level advisory official at the Central Secretariat; imperial chronicler (起居郎, Qiju Lang); Libu Yuanwailang (禮部員外郎), a low-level official at the ministry of rites (禮部, Libu); and Bingbu Yuanwailang (兵部員外郎), a low-level official at the ministry of defense (兵部, Bingbu). When Emperor Xizong fled from Chang'an to Chengdu late in 880 due to an attack by the major agrarian rebel Huang Chao, Du also fled and caught up with the emperor in Chengdu. When the chancellor Xiao Gou also served as the director of finances, Du, in addition to his duty at the ministry of defense, also served under Xiao in that capacity. Subsequently, he was also made Libu Langzhong (禮部郎中), a supervisory official at the ministry of rites, as well as an editor of imperial history. Thereafter, he was put in charge of drafting edicts, and was also made Zhongshu Sheren (中書舍人), a mid-level official at the legislative bureau. It was said that, at that time, as Emperor Xizong had to often issue edicts in monitoring the Tang forces' campaigns against Huang, many edicts had to be written quickly, and Du wrote effectively and efficiently. Emperor Xizong was happy about his abilities and made him the deputy minister of census (戶部侍郎, Hubu Shilang). After Emperor Xizong was able to return to Chang'an after Huang's defeat, Du was made the minister of rites (禮部尚書, Libu Shangshu), given the honorary title of Yinqing Guanglu Daifu (銀青光祿大夫), and created the Viscount of Jianping. Subsequently, he was made the minister of defense (兵部尚書, Bingbu Shangshu) and chief imperial scholar (翰林學士承旨, Hanlin Xueshi Chengzhi).

In late 885, after the powerful eunuch Tian Lingzi got into a dispute with the warlord Wang Chongrong the military governor of Hezhong Circuit (河中, headquartered in modern Yuncheng, Shanxi) and tried to transfer Wang to another circuit, Wang and his ally Li Keyong the military governor of Hedong Circuit (河東, headquartered in modern Taiyuan, Shanxi) engaged the forces under Tian and Tian's allies Zhu Mei the military governor of Jingnan Circuit (靜難, headquartered in modern Xianyang) and Li Changfu the military governor of Fengxiang Circuit (鳳翔, headquartered in modern Baoji, Shaanxi). Wang's and Li Keyong's forces defeated those under Tian, Zhu, and Li Changfu, and approached Chang'an. Emperor Xizong fled to Xingyuan (興元, in modern Hanzhong), and initially, very few imperial officials followed, with Du being one of the few. Subsequently, Emperor Xizong made both him and another official who followed to Xingyuan, Kong Wei, chancellors, with the designation Tong Zhongshu Menxia Pingzhangshi (同中書門下平章事).

== As chancellor ==
By this time, however, Zhu Mei had occupied Chang'an and declared Emperor Xizong's distant relative Li Yun the Prince of Xiang the new emperor, and it was said that few circuits remained obedient to Emperor Xizong. With Tian Lingzi realizing that the people of the empire were largely against him and having left Emperor Xizong's presence (to join his brother Chen Jingxuan the military governor of Xichuan Circuit (西川, headquartered in modern Chengdu)) and another eunuch, Yang Fugong having succeeded Tian as the commander of the Shence Armies (神策軍), Du pointed out that Yang Fugong's brother Yang Fuguang had worked closely with Wang Chongrong and Li Keyong in defeating Huang and recapturing Chang'an. He suggested having Yang write letters to Wang and Li Keyong to persuade them to rejoin Emperor Xizong's cause, and after Yang did so, Wang and Li Keyong redeclared their allegiance to Emperor Xizong and sent material supplies to Xingyuan.

Late in the year, with Zhu's officer Wang Xingyu, whom Zhu had ordered to try to capture Xingyuan to seize Emperor Xizong, unsuccessful in that task, Wang Xingyu was enticed by Yang's declaration that if anyone killed Zhu, that person would be allowed to succeed Zhu as the military governor of Jingnan. He thus ambushed Zhu at Chang'an and killed him. Li Yun fled to Hezhong and was executed by Wang Chongrong. Thereafter, Emperor Xizong made Du Zhongshu Shilang (中書侍郎, the deputy head of the legislative bureau) and minister of defense, with the honorary title of Tejin (特進), and created him the Duke of Xiangyang. It was said that at that time, Emperor Xizong initially ordered that all officials who accepted offices from Li Yun be put to death, but Du, intervening for them, were able to get some 70-80% spared. Subsequently, when Emperor Xizong went to Fengxiang on the path back to Chang'an, the imperial guards and Li Changfu's forces got into a conflict and openly battled each other. During the battle, Du walked on foot to Emperor Xizong's provisional palace and attended to the emperor, and it was said that this action helped inspired the imperial guards in defeating Li Changfu, who was subsequently killed by his own subordinate Xue Zhicou (薛知籌). The imperial guard general Li Maozhen was given Fengxiang instead.

After Emperor Xizong died in 888 was succeeded by his brother Emperor Zhaozong, Du continued to serve as chancellor, and was created the Duke of Jin. In 890, when Kong and another chancellor, Zhang Jun advocated a campaign against Li Keyong, Du and another chancellor, Liu Chongwang opposed, but Emperor Zhaozong declared the campaign over their opposition, putting Zhang in overall command of the operations, which ended in utter failure in 891, at great losses to the imperial government, which was forced to pardon Li Keyong.

In 892, with Yang Fugong, who had a falling out with Emperor Zhaozong, having started a rebellion against the imperial government at Shannan West with his adoptive nephew Yang Shouliang (Yang Fuguang's adoptive son), Li Maozhen, Wang Xingyu, Han Jian the military governor of Zhenguo Circuit (鎮國, headquartered in modern Weinan, Shaanxi), Wang Xingyu's brother Wang Xingyue (王行約) the military governor of Kuangguo Circuit (匡國, headquartered in modern Weinan as well), and Li Maozhen's brother Li Maozhuang (李茂莊) the military governor of Tianxiong Circuit (天雄, headquartered in modern Tianshui, Gansu) all petitioned Emperor Xizong to declare a general campaign against the Yangs and put Li Maozhen in charge of the overall operations. Emperor Xizong initially was apprehensive that if Li Maozhen defeated the Yangs, he would seize Shannan West and be even harder to control, and so ordered peace negotiations, but Li Maozhen and Wang Xingyu, ignoring the orders, started attacking Yang Shouliang on their own. Li Maozhen further wrote arrogant letters to Du and Ximen Junsui (西門君遂) the new commander of the Shence Armies. Emperor Zhaozong was forced to relent and agree to put Li Maozhen in charge of the operations. By the end of the year, Li Maozhen had defeated the Yangs, who were arrested in flight by Han and delivered to Chang'an to be executed.

== Death at Li Maozhen's insistence ==
In the aftermaths of LI Maozhen's victory over the Yangs, however, as Emperor Zhaozong feared, he became even more arrogant in his communications with the imperial government. In spring 893, after he sent a petition stating that he wanted to be the military governor of Shannan West—i.e., intending to control both Fengxiang and Shannan West—Emperor Zhaozong issued an edict transferring Li Maozhen to Shannan West while naming the chancellor Xu Yanruo the new military governor of Fengxiang, while trying to placate Li Maozhen by also giving him Wuding Circuit (武定, headquartered in modern Hanzhong as well). Li Maozhen, disappointed, refused, and further submitted disrespectful and threatening petitions to Emperor Zhaozong, while also writing threatening letters to Du.

In anger, Emperor Zhaozong wanted to declare a general campaign against Li Maozhen. Du, pointing out that the imperial armies were no longer, at this point, of battling warlords, advocated restraint. Emperor Zhaozong did not listen, and ordered Du to be in charge of the operations. Du, despite his reluctance, accepted the order. However, Du's chancellor colleague Cui Zhaowei was conspiring with Li Maozhen and Wang Xingyu, and therefore, everything that Du planned was leaked to Li Maozhen and Wang Xingyu. They reacted by inciting the people at Chang'an to protest against the planned campaign, including violent protests in the presence of Ximen, Cui, and another chancellor, Zheng Yanchang. Emperor Zhaozong's resolve against Li Maozhen was initially not changed, and he put Li Sizhou (李嗣周) the Prince of Qin in command of 30,000 men to attack Li Maozhen, assisted by the imperial guard general Li Hui (李鐬), to escort Xu to Fengxiang.

Li Maozhen and Wang Xingyu mobilized their forces, some 60,000 strong, to resist Li Sizhou. As the Fengxiang and Jingnan forces were seasoned veterans, and the imperial forces were new recruits with little combat experience, before the armies could engage each other, the imperial forces were stricken with panic and collapsed. Li Maozhen and Wang Xingyu approached Chang'an. Cui, who had long resented Du, informed Li Maozhen that it was not Emperor Zhaozong's idea to attack Li Maozhen, but Du's. Li Maozhen thus submitted a petition listing a number of accusations against Du, demanding Du's death. Du stated to Emperor Zhaozong, "I had long predicted what would happen. Please allow me to trade my life for Your Imperial Majesty's safety." Emperor Zhaozong initially tried to placate Li Maozhen by exiling Du to be the prefect of Wu Prefecture (梧州, in modern Wuzhou, Guangxi) while also executing Ximen and two other top eunuchs, Li Zhoutong (李周潼) and Duan Xu (段詡) and blaming the campaign on Ximen, Li Zhoutong, and Duan. But even a further demotion of Du to be the census officer at Lei Prefecture (雷州, in modern Zhanjiang, Guangdong) did not placate Li Maozhen, who continued to demand Du's death and announced that he would not withdraw until it occurred. Emperor Zhaozong was forced to order Du, as well as his brother Du Honghui (杜弘徽), to commit suicide. Subsequently, after Li Keyong defeated and killed Wang Xingyu and forced Li Maozhen into brief submission to the imperial government, Emperor Zhaozong posthumously honored Du. Du's son Du Xiao later served as a chancellor during the succeeding Later Liang.

== Notes and references ==
- Old Book of Tang, vol. 177.
- New Book of Tang, vol. 96.
- Zizhi Tongjian, vols. 256, 257, 258, 259.
