= Cui Zhaowei =

- Traditional Chinese: 崔昭緯
- Simplified Chinese: 崔昭纬
Transcriptions
Standard Mandarin
- Hanyu Pinyin: Cuī Zhāowěi
- Wade–Giles: Ts'ui1 Chao1-wei3

Yunyao
- Traditional Chinese: 蘊曜
- Simplified Chinese: 蕴曜
Transcriptions
Standard Mandarin
- Hanyu Pinyin: Yùnyào
- Wade–Giles: Yün4-yao4

Cui Zhaowei (崔昭緯) (d. 896), courtesy name Yunyao (蘊曜), was an official of the Chinese Tang dynasty, who served as a chancellor during the reign of Emperor Zhaozong. According to traditional histories, he was disloyal to Emperor Zhaozong and manipulated the court scene by conspiring with the eunuchs and the warlords Li Maozhen the military governor of Fengxiang Circuit (鳳翔, headquartered in modern Baoji, Shaanxi) and Wang Xingyu the military governor of Jingnan Circuit (靜難, headquartered in modern Xianyang, Shaanxi). After Li Keyong the military governor of Hedong Circuit (河東, headquartered in modern Taiyuan, Shanxi) defeated Wang and forced LI Maozhen into submission, Emperor Zhaozong exiled Cui and later had him executed.

== Background ==
It is not known when Cui Zhaowei was born. His biographies in the Old Book of Tang and the New Book of Tang both indicate that he was from the prominent Cui clan of Qinghe, which was descended from the Spring and Autumn period state Qi; and the table of the chancellors' family trees in the New Book of Tang further traced him specifically to the "Southern Ancestor" branch of the clan, which included officials of Han dynasty, Cao Wei, Jin dynasty (266–420), Later Zhao, Liu Song, Northern Wei, Northern Qi, Northern Zhou, and Tang dynasty. According to Cui Zhaowei's biography in the Old Book of Tang, his grandfather Cui Bi (崔庇) served as a county sheriff, while his father Cui Yan (崔巘) served as the governor of Eyue Circuit (鄂岳, headquartered in modern Wuhan, Hubei), but the table of the chancellors' family trees in the New Book of Tang do not describe Cui Bi and Cui Yan as having those offices, and Cui Zhaowei's biography in the New Book of Tang omitted references to them altogether. Cui Zhaowei had at least two older brothers, Cui Zhaofu (崔昭符) and Cui Zhaoyuan (崔昭原), and at least one younger brother, Cui Zhaoju (崔昭矩).

Apparently at some point prior to the reign of Emperor Zhaozong, Cui Zhaowei passed the imperial examinations in the Jinshi (進士) class. During Emperor Zhaozong's reign, he served (unclear if successively or concurrently) as Zhongshu Sheren (中書舍人), a mid-level official at the legislative bureau of government (中書省, Zhongshu Sheng); imperial scholar (翰林學士, Hanlin Xueshi); and deputy minister of census (戶部侍郎, Hubu Shilang). In 891, in the aftermaths of an imperial defeat in a campaign against the warlord Li Keyong the military governor (Jiedushi) of Hedong Circuit (河東, headquartered in modern Taiyuan, Shanxi), the chancellors Zhang Jun and Kong Wei, who were the main proponents of the campaign, were removed from their offices, and Cui, who was at that time the chief imperial scholar (翰林學士承旨, Hanlin Xueshi Chengzhi) and deputy minister of defense (兵部侍郎, Bingbu Shilang), was made a chancellor with the designation Tong Zhongshu Menxia Pingzhangshi (同中書門下平章事), along with Xu Yanruo.

== As chancellor ==
It was said that, as a chancellor, Cui Zhaowei was treacherous and jealous of others with seniority or ability. He formed alliances with eunuchs and nearby warlords to further enhance his power at the imperial court. He was particularly in close communications with Li Maozhen the military governor of Fengxiang Circuit and Wang Xingyu the military governor of Jingnan Circuit, two warlords who were geographically close to the imperial capital Chang'an. Thus, when Emperor Zhaozong began to plan a campaign against Li and Wang in 893 and put the chancellor Du Rangneng in charge of planning the campaign, it was said that whatever Du said in the morning would be found out by the two warlords in the evening. Later in the year, when Emperor Zhaozong commissioned Xu Yanruo as the military governor of Fengxiang to try to replace Li and commissioned Li Sizhou (李嗣周) the Prince of Qin as the commander of an imperial army to try to escort Xu to Fengxiang, Li Maozhen and Wang resisted and defeated Li Sizhou. At Cui's instigation, the two military governors then marched on the capital. Cui, who was jealous of Du, informed them that the campaign was Du's idea, and at their insistence Emperor Zhaozong was forced to order Du to commit suicide and kill the eunuchs Ximen Junsui (西門君遂), Li Zhoutong (李周潼), and Duan Xu (段詡), who were also considered proponents of the campaign. It was said that from this point on, Emperor Zhaozong could no longer rule independently of Li Maozhen and Wang, due to the close connection between Cui and the two warlords — in particular, if there were any proposals by other chancellors that Cui opposed, Cui would have his clansman Cui Ting (崔鋌), who served on Wang's staff, inform Wang, and have Wang Chao (王超), who served on Li Maozhen's staff, inform Li Maozhen. The two warlords would then submit petitions opposing the proposals, and if Emperor Zhaozong even hesitated at rescinding the proposals, they would next submit petitions threatening the emperor. Meanwhile, in 893, at Cui's recommendation, his distant relative Cui Yin (a son of the deceased chancellor Cui Shenyou) was made a chancellor as well.

Later in 893, the major warlord Zhu Quanzhong the military governor of Xuanwu Circuit (宣武, headquartered in modern Kaifeng, Henan), requested that the directorate of the salt and iron monopolies be relocated to his headquarters at Bian Prefecture (汴州). Cui, citing the fact that Zhu had just recently dealt major defeats to Shi Pu the military governor of Ganhua Circuit (感化, headquartered in modern Xuzhou, Jiangsu) and Zhu Xuan the military governor of Tianping Circuit (天平, headquartered in modern Tai'an, Shandong) and arguing that allowing Zhu Quanzhong to hold the directorate would make him impossible to control, opposed. Emperor Zhaozong agreed and issued an edict declining Zhu Quanzhong's proposal.

In 894, Emperor Zhaozong was set to make then-chief imperial scholar Li Xi, from whom he learned writing, a chancellor. As the edict naming Li Xi chancellor was being read, the official Liu Chonglu (劉崇魯), at Cui's instigation — as Cui was fearful that Li Xi would divert power from him as co-chancellor — stepped out of his place at the imperial meeting, grabbed the edict, and began to weep, claiming that Li Xi was a wicked man who associated with the eunuch Yang Fugong and Ximen. Emperor Zhaozong, faced with this unprecedented display, was forced to put off naming Li Xi chancellor, and in fact for a time demoted Li Xi to the honorary post of advisor to the Crown Prince. However, in 895, Emperor Zhaozong named Li Xi chancellor anyway. Displeased with this development, Cui had Cui Ting, who had become Wang Xingyu's deputy military governor by this point, inform Wang that Li Xi and fellow chancellor Wei Zhaodu were part of the emperor's faction against him and Li Maozhen. Wang and Li Maozhen therefore repeatedly submitted petitions objecting to Li Xi's chancellorship; Emperor Zhaozong was thereafter forced to remove Li Xi again. That, however, did not placate Li Maozhen and Wang, who were also displeased that Emperor Zhaozong was accepting Li Keyong's proposal to have, after the death of Wang Chongying the military governor of Huguo Circuit (護國, headquartered in modern Yuncheng, Shanxi), Wang Chongying's nephew Wang Ke (Li Keyong's son-in-law) succeed Wang Chongying, rather than Wang Chongying's son Wang Gong, who was allied with Li Maozhen and Wang Xingyu. They marched on the capital again along with a third ally, Han Jian the military governor of Zhenguo Circuit (鎮國, headquartered in modern Weinan, Shaanxi), and they executed Li Xi and Wei over Emperor Zhaozong's protest.

In reaction to Li Xi's and Wei's deaths, Li Keyong launched an army and headed for Chang'an, preparing to attack Li Maozhen, Wang Xingyu, and Han. Subsequently, a rift developed between Li Maozhen and Wang, as both wanted to take Emperor Zhaozong to his circuit. Emperor Zhaozong, knowing that they wanted to seize him, instead fled into the Qinling Mountains. Cui, as well as the other chancellors Xu and Wang Tuan, followed. Meanwhile, Li Keyong defeated Li Maozhen and Wang Xingyu, and subsequently put Wang's capital Bin Prefecture (邠州) under siege. Wang tried to flee out of the siege, but was killed by his own subordinates in flight. In fear, Li Maozhen and Han outward submitted to the imperial government, and Emperor Zhaozong, who also did not want Li Keyong to grow overly strong, ordered Li Keyong to end his campaign against Li Maozhen. Still, for the time being, Cui had lost his warlord allies, and, after Emperor Zhaozong returned to Chang'an, Cui was stripped of his chancellorship and made You Pushe (右僕射), one of the heads of the executive bureau (尚書省, Shangshu Sheng), but no longer chancellor.

== Exile and death ==
Shortly after Cui Zhaowei was stripped of his chancellorship, Emperor Zhaozong further exiled him to be the military advisor to the prefect of Wu Prefecture (梧州, in modern Wuzhou, Guangxi). On the way to exile, Cui wrote Zhu Quanzhong, hoping that Zhu would intercede on his behalf. Instead, Emperor Zhaozong issued an edict ordering Cui to commit suicide. The eunuch delivering the edict intercepted Cui at Jingnan Circuit (荊南, headquartered in modern Jingzhou, Hubei, not the same circuit that Wang Xingyu ruled) and had him beheaded.

== Notes and references ==
- Old Book of Tang, vol. 179.
- New Book of Tang, vol. 223, part 2.
- Zizhi Tongjian, vols. 258, 259, 260.
