= Wang Tuan =

Wang Tuan (王摶) (died July 12, 900), courtesy name Zhaoyi (昭逸), formally the Duke of Lu (魯公), was an official of the Chinese Tang dynasty, who served as a chancellor from 895 to 900, during the reign of Emperor Zhaozong. In 900, his powerful colleague Cui Yin falsely accused him of associating with eunuchs, and Emperor Zhaozong forced him to commit suicide.

== Background ==
It is not known when Wang Tuan was born. He was born from a lineage that had two male-line ancestors who were chancellors earlier in history — his 10th generation ancestor Wang Fangqing, who served under the female sovereign Wu Zetian, and his great-grandfather Wang Yu, who served under Emperor Suzong. Both his grandfather Wang Ji (王及) and father Wang Hui (王鐬) also served honored positions in the imperial administration.

== Early career ==
At some point, Wang Tuan passed the imperial examinations in the Jinshi (進士) class. He thereafter served on the staff of the former chancellor Wang Duo (who was not related to him, as Wang Tuan was from the "Langye Branch" of Wangs while Wang Duo was from the "Taiyuan Branch" of Wangs) in Wang Duo's role as the prefect of Hua Prefecture (滑州, in modern Anyang, Henan). Wang Tuan later served as the prefect of Su Prefecture (蘇州, in modern Suzhou, Jiangsu), and later the deputy minister of census (戶部侍郎, Hubu Shilang) as well as director of taxation (判戶部, Pan Hubu).

== As chancellor ==
In 895, when Emperor Zhaozong commissioned the chancellor Cui Yin to be the military governor of Huguo Circuit (護國, headquartered in modern Yuncheng, Shanxi) in an (ultimately unsuccessful) attempt to take back control of Huguo for the imperial government, he made Wang Tuan Zhongshu Shilang (中書侍郎) — the deputy head of the legislative bureau of government (中書省, Zhongshu Sheng) — and a chancellor with the designation of Tong Zhongshu Menxia Pingzhangshi (同中書門下平章事) to replace Cui. While it was said that Wang was understanding and magnanimous, and that the people considered him an excellent chancellor, little is known about Wang's own actions as chancellor, other than that, when Emperor Zhaozong fled from the imperial capital Chang'an into the Qinling Mountains later in the year in fear of being taken hostage by the warlords Li Maozhen the military governor of Fengxiang Circuit (鳳翔, headquartered in modern Baoji, Shaanxi) and Wang Xingyu the military governor of Jingnan Circuit (靜難, headquartered in modern Xianyang, Shaanxi), Wang Tuan, along with other chancellors Cui Zhaowei and Xu Yanruo, accompanied the emperor.

In 896, while Emperor Zhaozong was at Hua Prefecture (華州, in modern Weinan, Shaanxi) due to another attack by Li Maozhen on the capital, the warlord Qian Liu the military governor of Zhenhai Circuit (鎮海, headquartered in modern Hangzhou, Zhejiang) defeated and killed fellow warlord Dong Chang the military governor of Weisheng Circuit (威勝, headquartered in modern Shaoxing, Zhejiang) (who had declared himself the emperor of a new state of Dayue Luoping (大越羅平) but then disavowed the declaration), thus taking over control of Weisheng. Emperor Zhaozong, apparently in an attempt to take back control of Weisheng, commissioned Wang as the military governor of Weisheng, still carrying the Tong Zhongshu Menxia Pingzhangshi designation as an honorary title. However, Qian, not willing to cede control of Weisheng, encouraged the people of Zhenhai and Weisheng Circuits to submit petitions to have Qian be the military governor of both circuits. Emperor Zhaozong, bowing to the pressure, recalled Wang to serve as chancellor again, as well as the minister of civil service affairs (吏部尚書, Libu Shangshu), while naming Qian the military governor of both circuits. After Emperor Zhaozong created his son Li Yu, Prince of De Crown Prince in 897, Wang Tuan suggested that a general pardon be issued to show the importance of the creation. Emperor Zhaozong thereafter gave Wang the titles of You Pushe (右僕射), one of the heads of the executive bureau (尚書省, Shangshu Sheng), as well as Sikong (司空, one of the Three Excellencies). He also created Wang the Duke of Lu.

== Death ==
Meanwhile, by spring 900, Cui Yin had become the most powerful official at the imperial court. Cui had already previously intensely plotted with Emperor Zhaozong in considering whether to slaughter the eunuchs. Wang, fearing that such plotting would lead to an explosive confrontation between imperial officials and eunuchs, urged caution. Cui, who had earlier already accused Wang of working in concert with the eunuch directors of palace communications Zhu Daobi (朱道弼) and Jing Wuxiu (景務脩), had previously suspected Wang Tuan of squeezing him out of the chancellorship in 899, and further despised Wang after he was, in spring 900, sent out of the capital to serve as the military governor of Qinghai Circuit (清海, headquartered in modern Guangzhou, Guangdong). Before he left the capital, he renewed the accusations against Wang. Subsequently, Cui's ally Zhu Quanzhong the military governor of Xuanwu Circuit (宣武, headquartered in modern Kaifeng, Henan) submitted a petition urging that Cui be returned to the chancellorship and accusing Wang of collaborating with the eunuchs. Emperor Zhaozong recalled Cui to Chang'an to serve as chancellor again, while demoting Wang to be the deputy minister of public works (工部侍郎, Gongbu Shilang). Within a few days, Wang was further demoted to be the prefect of Xi Prefecture (溪州, in modern Xiangxi Tujia and Miao Autonomous Prefecture, Hunan), then to be the census officer at Yai Prefecture (崖州, in modern Haikou, Hainan). The same day that the exile to Yai Prefecture was announced, Wang was forced to commit suicide (as were Zhu Daobi and Jing), and Wang died at Lantian Station (藍田驛, in modern Xi'an, Shaanxi).

== Notes and references ==
- New Book of Tang, vol. 116.
- Zizhi Tongjian, vols. 260, 262.
