= Han Jian (Zhenguo warlord) =

Warlord and official of the Tang and Later Liang dynasties

Han Jian (Chinese: 韓建; 855 – August 15, 912), courtesy name Zuoshi (佐時), was a warlord and official of the Tang and Later Liang dynasties of China. He is most well known for having had Emperor Zhaozong of Tang under his control at his power base at Hua Prefecture (華州; in modern-day Weinan, Shaanxi) from 896 to 898 and slaughtering the imperial princes while Emperor Zhaozong was there. He served as chancellor of the Later Liang dynasty.

== During Tang dynasty ==
=== Background and early career ===
Han Jian was born in 855, during the reign of Emperor Xuānzong of Tang. He was from Xu Prefecture (許州, in modern Xuchang, Henan). His ancestors, including his father Han Shufeng (韓叔豐), had served for generations in the army. When Qin Zongquan took over Cai Prefecture (蔡州, in modern Zhumadian, Henan) in 880, he encouraged people to join his army, and Han Jian did.

In 881, when the eunuch general Yang Fuguang was able to persuade Zhou Ji the military governor (jiedushi) of Zhongwu Circuit (忠武, headquartered at Xu Prefecture) to renounce his allegiance to Huang Chao — a major agrarian rebel who had captured the Tang capital Chang'an, forced then-reigning Emperor Xizong (Emperor Xuānzong's grandson) to flee to Chengdu, and declared himself the emperor of a new state of Qi — and return to the Tang fold, Yang also persuaded Qin to send forces to contribute to the war efforts against Huang's Qi state. Yang organized his army into eight corps, commanded by Lu Yanhong, Jin Hui (晉暉), Wang Jian, Han Jian, Zhang Zao (張造), Li Shitai (李師泰), and Pang Cong (龐從) respectively. Han thereafter served under Yang.

Yang Fuguang died in 883 while stationed at Hezhong Circuit (河中, in modern Yuncheng, Shanxi) and still fighting against Huang. Instead of continuing to fight against Huang, Lu decided to take his troops and rove around the region, pillaging as he went. Wang, Han, Zhang, Jin, and Li followed him as well. Later in 883, Lu captured Xingyuan (興元, in modern Hanzhong, Shaanxi) the capital of Shannan West Circuit (山南西道), expelling the military governor Niu Xu (牛勗) and claiming the title of acting military governor. He commissioned Han and the other Zhongwu corps commanders as prefects within Shannan West, but did not allow them to actually report to their prefectures. He was particularly suspicious of Wang and Han because of their deep friendship, but wanting to comfort them, he often treated them well. Wang and Han realized Lu's intentions, however, and in fall 884, with Emperor Xizong's trusted eunuch Tian Lingzi secretly tempting them with offers of good treatment, they, along with Zhang, Jin, and Li, abandoned Lu and fled to Chengdu to serve under Tian. After Emperor Xizong returned to Chang'an in 885 after Huang's defeat, Han was made the defender of Tong Pass and the prefect of Hua Prefecture.

=== Governance at Hua Prefecture ===
==== Prior to Emperor Zhaozong's stay at Hua Prefecture ====
At that time, the Tang empire was divided between warlords, most of whom were only interested in battling and seizing more territory. However, as the prefect of Hua Prefecture, Han Jian encouraged the refugees from the wars to settle in Hua and promoted agriculture. It was said that within a span of a few years, both the Hua prefectural government and the people of Hua were wealthy. The popular sentiment at the time greatly praised him, along with Cheng Rui the military governor of Jingnan Circuit (荊南, headquartered in modern Jingzhou, Hubei).

By 890, Han was carrying the title of military governor as well, of a newly created Zhenguo Circuit (鎮國), which included only Hua Prefecture and nearby Tong Prefecture (同州, also in modern Weinan). That year, when Emperor Xizong's brother and successor Emperor Zhaozong declared a general campaign against Li Keyong the military governor of Hedong Circuit (河東, headquartered in modern Taiyuan, Shanxi) and put the chancellor Zhang Jun in command of the operations, Han personally led his army to join Zhang's and was also responsible for supplying the army. The imperial army, however, was dealt a blow when Zhang's deputy commander, Sun Kui (孫揆), was captured in an ambush by Li Keyong's adoptive son Li Cunxiao. Subsequently, when the imperial army and Li Keyong's main army met, Han carried out a nighttime attack against Li Cunxiao but was repelled. After Han's defeat, the armies from Fengxiang (鳳翔, headquartered in modern Baoji, Shaanxi) and Jingnan (靜難, headquartered in modern Xianyang, Shaanxi, not the same circuit Cheng ruled) deserted the imperial army. After Li Keyong's army further defeated Zhang and forced the imperial army into a defensive posture at Jin Prefecture (晉州, in modern Linfen, Shanxi), the armies from Baoda (保大, headquartered in modern Yan'an, Shaanxi) and Dingnan (定難, headquartered in modern Yulin, Shaanxi) Circuits also abandoned the imperial army, leaving Zhang and Han defending Jin Prefecture with troops sent by Li Keyong's archrival Zhu Quanzhong the military governor of Xuanwu Circuit (宣武, headquartered in modern Kaifeng, Shanxi). Li Cunxiao put Jin under siege, but after deciding that capturing a chancellor would be a bad idea, he lifted the siege and allowed Zhang and Han to flee, and they did. To flee back west across the Yellow River, they were forced to tear down local residents' homes and use the building material to construct rafts. The defeat left the imperial army in shambles, although the extent of damage to Han's own army is unclear. Subsequently, Li Keyong, as a condition for resubmitting to the imperial government, demanded the exiles of Zhang and fellow chancellor Kong Wei; however, instead of going into exile, both Zhang and Kong fled to Hua, where Han put them under his protection.

In 891, after accusations of treason were made against the powerful eunuch Yang Fugong (Yang Fuguang's brother), Emperor Zhaozong sent imperial guards to attack Yang's mansion. Yang fled to Yang Fuguang's adoptive son Yang Shouliang the military governor of Shannan West, and they, along with Yang Fugong's other adoptive sons or nephews Yang Shouzhong (楊守忠), Yang Shouzhen (楊守貞), and Yang Shouhou (楊守厚), all of whom were nearby governors, rose against the imperial government. In spring 892, Han, along with Li Maozhen the military governor of Fengxiang, Wang Xingyu the military governor of Jingnan, Li Maozhen's brother Li Maozhuang (李茂莊) the military governor of Tianxiong Circuit (天雄, headquartered in modern Tianshui, Gansu), and Wang Xingyu's brother Wang Xingyue (王行約) the military governor of Kuangguo Circuit (匡國, headquartered at Tong Prefecture) (thus showing that Han had lost control of Tong by this point), submitted a petition for Emperor Zhaozong to declare a general campaign against Yang Fugong and his adoptive sons/nephews and make Li Maozhen the overall commander of the operations. Emperor Zhaozong hesitated, believing that if Li Maozhen conquered the Yangs' territory, he would be even harder to control, but Li Maozhen launched the campaign anyway without imperial sanction, forcing Emperor Zhaozong to eventually agree to the campaign. Li Maozhen eventually defeated the Yangs, forcing them to try to flee to Li Keyong (except Yang Shouhou who seemed to die a natural death around that time); on the way, they were intercepted and arrested by Han's soldiers. Han delivered them to Chang'an, where they were executed. Li Maozhen took over their territory.

In 895, a succession dispute that rose after the death of Wang Chongying the military governor of Huguo Circuit (護國, new name for Hezhong) brought Han and his allies Li Maozhen and Wang Xingyu into direct dispute with the imperial government and Li Keyong. Wang Chongying's brother and predecessor Wang Chongrong had adopted Wang Ke, the biological son of his brother Wang Chongjian (王重簡), as his own son, and after Wang Chongying's death, the soldiers at Hezhong, with Li Keyong's backing, wanted Wang Ke to succeed Wang Chongying. However, Wang Chongying's own biological sons Wang Gong the military governor of Baoyi Circuit (保義, headquartered in modern Sanmenxia, Henan) and Wang Yao (王瑤) the prefect of Jin had wanted Wang Gong to take over instead, and thus induced Han, Li Maozhen, and Wang Xingyu to lobby Emperor Zhaozong on Wang Gong's behalf. Emperor Zhaozong approved Li Keyong's request and rejected that of Han and his allies, leaving the three feeling humiliated. Wang Xingyu and Han were further displeased that their requests to take over two Shence Army bases were rejected as well. In summer 895, Han, Li Maozhen, and Wang Xingyu decided to march on Chang'an. They accused the former chancellors Wei Zhaodu and Li Xi, whom they viewed to be against them, of corruption, and when Emperor Zhaozong refused to execute Wei and Li Xi, they executed Wei and Li Xi anyway. They also forced Emperor Zhaozong to issue an edict transferring Wang Ke to Kuangguo, Wang Gong to Hezhong, and Wang Xingyue to Baoyi, before returning to their own circuits (but leaving troops at Chang'an to watch over Emperor Zhaozong).

Han's and his allies' actions spurred Li Keyong into action. He quickly defeated and killed Wang Yao, and then advanced across the Yellow River, putting Hua Prefecture under siege. Han's pleas to Li Keyong to lift the siege were initially spurned by Li Keyong, but Li Keyong, after hearing that Li Maozhen and Wang Xingyu were both intending to capture Emperor Zhaozong, advanced quickly toward Jingnan. (Li Maozhen's and Wang Xingyu's forces at Chang'an did, in fact, dispute among themselves and each attempted to capture Emperor Zhaozong, but Emperor Zhaozong, under protection by the imperial guards, fled into the Qinling Mountains instead and eluded capture.) Li Keyong put Jingnan's capital Bin Prefecture (邠州) under siege; Wang Xingyu tried to flee, but was killed in flight by his own subordinates. Li Maozhen and Han, in fear, became very submissive in their attitude toward the imperial government. Li Keyong subsequently requested permission from Emperor Zhaozong to destroy Li Maozhen as well, but Emperor Zhaozong, wanting to maintain a balance of power, forbid him, and he subsequently withdrew — and it was said that after Li Keyong's withdrawal, Li Maozhen and Han again became arrogant.

In 896, Emperor Zhaozong tried to alleviate the pressures that Li Maozhen and Han were putting on the imperial government by recruiting new soldiers for the imperial guards, putting them under the commands of several imperial princes. Li Maozhen declared that the imperial princes were planning to attack him and that he would defend himself, mobilizing his own forces to again march on Chang'an. Emperor Zhaozong sought emergency aid from Li Keyong, but Li Keyong was unable to respond. When Li Maozhen then defeated Li Sizhou (李嗣周) the Prince of Qin and approached Chang'an, Emperor Zhaozong decided to take the imperial officials and princes and flee Chang'an — which Fengxiang forces then entered and burned. After leaving Chang'an, he initially intended, at the recommendation of Li Jiepi (李戒丕) the Prince of Yan, to flee to Hedong. However, Han made several petitions to Emperor Zhaozong, urging him to head to Zhenguo instead, arguing that if Emperor Zhaozong went as far as Hedong, he would never be able to return to the Chang'an region. Emperor Zhaozong and his attendants also were hesitant to make the long trek to Hedong, and so went to Zhenguo instead.

==== During and after Emperor Zhaozong's stay at Hua Prefecture ====
Emperor Zhaozong's chancellors (at that time, Wang Tuan, Sun Wo, and Lu Yi), who fled with him to Zhenguo, were apprehensive of Han Jian and were not daring to decide on policy matters. Emperor Zhaozong, in response, issued an edict asking Han to participate in the policy decisions, but after Han declined, cancelled the request. Meanwhile, another chancellor who had been removed at Han's behest, Cui Yin, sought aid from Zhu Quanzhong, who had submitted a petition asking Emperor Zhaozong to move the capital to Luoyang; Zhu made a posture to attack Han and wrote Han to suggest that Cui should be restored. Han, in fear, recommended Cui's restoration, and Cui was subsequently restored.

Emperor Zhaozong subsequently bestowed the honorary chancellor title of Zhongshu Ling (中書令) on Han. He also put Sun in command of the operations against Li Maozhen and had Han be Sun's assistant as well as the mayor of Jingzhao Municipality (京兆, i.e., Chang'an region), preparing to attack Li Maozhen. However, Han did not want the emperor to attack his long-time ally, and Li Maozhen also submitted petitions begging forgiveness, and the imperial army was never put into actual attack mode. Meanwhile, Han, apprehensive of the imperial army soldiers that the imperial princes who fled to Zhenguo with Emperor Zhaozong commanded, falsely accused them of plotting treason, going as far as having soldiers surround Emperor Zhaozong's provisional palace clamoring for the princes to be stripped of their commands. Due to this threat, Emperor Zhaozong was forced to strip the princes of their commands, and to execute the imperial guard command Li Yun (李筠), who had up to that point protected Emperor Zhaozong well. Han then put the imperial princes under effective house arrest, leaving Emperor Zhaozong with no forces that he could command. Knowing that Emperor Zhaozong was displeased with him, he tried to alleviate the displeasure by urging Emperor Zhaozong to create his oldest son Li You the Prince of De crown prince. Emperor Zhaozong agreed and created Li You crown prince (changing his name to Li Yu) and Li Yu's mother Consort He empress. Also around the same time, Han falsely accused two of Emperor Zhaozong's close associates, the astronomer Ma Daoyin (馬道殷) and the physician Xu Yanshi (許巖士) and had them executed, and then used the excuse that Sun and a new chancellor, Zhu Pu, were associated with Ma and Xu, to have Sun and Zhu removed from their chancellor positions.

In summer 897, Li Maozhen, whose ally Gu Yanhui the military governor of Dongchuan Circuit (東川, headquartered in modern Mianyang, Sichuan) had suffered repeated defeats by Wang Jian (who by that point had taken over neighboring Xichuan Circuit (西川, headquartered in modern Chengdu) and was expanding his territory), submitted a petition urging Emperor Zhaozong to punish Wang for attacking Dongchuan. In response, Emperor Zhaozong, trying to use this as an excuse to recover Fengxiang, issued demoting Wang to be a prefectural prefect, transferring Li Maozhen to Xichuan, and making Li Sizhou the military governor of Fengxiang. When Li Sizhou headed for Fengxiang, Li Maozhen refused to let him take over the circuit, and put him and his soldiers under siege. It was only after Han wrote a letter to Li Maozhen that Li Maozhen lifted the siege against Li Sizhou to allow Li Sizhou to return to Zhenguo. Subsequently, as Wang also refused to yield Xichuan to Li Maozhen, the orders were cancelled.

Soon after Li Sizhou's return, Li Jiepi also returned from Hezhong, where he had gone to seek aid from Li Keyong — thus exposing the fact that Li Keyong, who had suffered defeats lately, would be unable to come to the emperor's aid. With the possibility that Li Keyong might intervene removed, Han submitted a petition demanding the deaths of Li Sizhou, Li Jiepi, and the other imperial princes, on accusations of treason. Emperor Zhaozong tried to alleviate the situation by not acting on Han's petition, but Han and the eunuch Liu Jishu the acting director of palace communications then acted on their own and executed Li Sizhou, Li Jiepi, Li Yun (李允) the Prince of Dan, Emperor Zhaozong's uncle Li Zi the Prince of Tong, and seven other princes. Meanwhile, Han sent threats to Li Maozhen's adoptive son Li Jitang (李繼瑭), who was then the military governor of Kuangguo, and Li Jitang fled back to Fengxiang, allowing Han to take over Kuangguo. Emperor Zhaozong thereafter made him the military governor of Kuangguo, in addition to Zhenguo.

Meanwhile, Zhu Quanzhong made repeated requests to have Emperor Zhaozong move to Luoyang. Both Li Maozhen and Han were apprehensive that Zhu would attack west, and therefore decided to repair the palaces at Chang'an to have Emperor Zhaozong return to Chang'an. They also made peace with Li Keyong. The palace reconstruction was completed in spring 898, and Han personally went to Chang'an to inspect them. In autumn 898, Emperor Zhaozong and his court returned to Chang'an, while Han remained at Zhenguo. Emperor Zhaozong bestowed the honorific title of acting Taifu (太傅) on him, and converted Hua Prefecture into a special municipality, Xingde (興德), making Han its mayor. He also created Han the Duke of Xu.

=== Submission to Zhu Quanzhong ===
In 901, after Emperor Zhaozong had been deposed by Liu Jishu and Wang Zhongxian (王仲先) in 900 but then restored by Shence Army officers who were loyal to him, Cui Yin proposed to Emperor Zhaozong that all of the eunuchs be massacred. The plan became known to Liu's and Wang's successors Han Quanhui and Zhang Yanhong (張彥弘), who, fearful of being killed, entered into an alliance with Li Maozhen and tried to have Cui removed. Cui, in turn fearful that the eunuchs would have him killed, requested that Zhu Quanzhong bring an army to Chang'an to act against the eunuchs. Hearing that Zhu had launched his troops, Han and Zhang forcibly took Emperor Zhaozong to Fengxiang.

Meanwhile, as Zhu's forces approached the region, Han Jian's subordinate Sima Ye (司馬鄴), whom Han had made the acting military governor of Kuangguo, surrendered Kuangguo to Zhu. Zhu sent Sima back to Zhenguo to have him relay Zhu's message — that if Han did not surrender, Zhu would attack. In fear, Han sent his deputy military governor Li Juchuan (李巨川) to surrender. The retired chancellor Zhang Jun met with Zhu and persuaded him that Han, who had long been allied with Li Maozhen, must be removed. When Zhu met him to rebuke him for his past deeds, Han blamed them on Li Juchuan. Zhu executed Li Juchuan but spared Han. Wanting to remove Han from the scene, however, he made Han the military governor of Zhongwu and transferred Zhongwu's military governor Zhao Xu (趙珝) to Kuangguo. It was said that the large amount of tax revenue that Han had obtained and saved during Emperor Zhaozong's stay at Hua Prefecture (Xingde Municipality having been abolished by this point) now fell into Zhu's hands.

Zhu subsequently put Fengxiang under siege. In 903, with Fengxiang suffering from a terrible famine due to the siege, Li Maozhen surrendered Emperor Zhaozong to Zhu and sued for peace. Zhu, with the emperor in his hands, began to consider usurping the throne. He first forced Emperor Zhaozong to kill Cui (who by now was aware of his intentions and were trying to raise an imperial army to counter it) and then forced Emperor Zhaozong to abandon Chang'an and move the capital to Luoyang. As Emperor Zhaozong went on the journey to Luoyang, he stopped at Hua Prefecture and stayed for some time there. At one point, Zhu went to meet him, along with Han, and he held a feast in their honor. Han, however, warned Zhu that Emperor Zhaozong might be planning to assassinate him at the feast (Han did so by stomping on Zhu's feet during the feast), and therefore Zhu cut the feast short and left it. Zhu thus became grateful to Han. Subsequently, Zhu made the Chang'an region into a new Youguo Circuit (佑國, headquartered at Chang'an) and made Han the military governor of Youguo. However, in 906 (by which time Emperor Zhaozong had been assassinated under Zhu's orders and succeeded by his son Emperor Ai), apparently concerned that given Youguo's vicinity to Fengxiang that Han might collaborate with Li Maozhen again, Zhu transferred Han to Pinglu Circuit (平盧, headquartered in modern Weifang, Shandong) and transferred the military governor of Pinglu, Wang Zhongshi (王重師), to Youguo.

== During Later Liang ==
In 907, Zhu Quanzhong forced Emperor Aizong to yield the throne to him, ending Tang and starting a new Later Liang as its Emperor Taizu. He made Han Jian acting Situ (司徒, one of the Three Excellencies) and gave him the designation of Tong Zhongshu Menxia Pingzhangshi (同中書門下平章事), making Han a chancellor, and in 908 gave Han the greater chancellor title of Shizhong (侍中). It was said that by this point, Emperor Taizu was often violent and unreasonable, and very few officials dared to make suggestions to him. Han, however, would do so, and he appreciated Han's advice. In 909, however, Han was removed from his chancellor post and given the honorary title of Taibao (太保). In 910, with Zhongwu and Kuangguo's names having been swapped in 908, Han was made the military governor of Kuangguo (i.e., the old Zhongwu Circuit).

In 912, Emperor Taizu was assassinated by his son Zhu Yougui the Prince of Ying, who falsely claimed that the assassination was by Emperor Taizu's adoptive son Zhu Youwen the Prince of Bo and had Zhu Youwen killed. Zhu Yougui then took the throne. In the aftermath of Emperor Taizu's death, the armies throughout the Later Liang realm became disturbed, but Han took no precautions against any disturbances at Kuangguo. Soon thereafter, his officer Zhang Hou (張厚) started a mutiny and killed Han. Han's son Han Congxun (韓從訓), whom Zhu Yougui had sent to Kuangguo to announce the news of Emperor Taizu's death, was also killed in the mutiny.

== Notes and references ==
- History of the Five Dynasties, vol. 15.
- New History of the Five Dynasties, vol. 40.
- Zizhi Tongjian, vols. 254, 256, 257, 258, 259, 260, 261, 262, 264, 265, 266, 267, 268.
