= Li Xi (Tang dynasty) =

Li Xi or Li Qi (李谿 per the Zizhi Tongjian and the History of the Five Dynasties or 李磎 per the Old Book of Tang and the New Book of Tang) (d. June 4, 895), courtesy name Jingwang (景望), nicknamed Li Shulou (李書樓), was an official of the Chinese Tang dynasty, serving briefly as a chancellor during the reign of Emperor Zhaozong. With imperial power dwindling, Li Xi's fellow chancellor Cui Zhaowei, who associated with the warlords Li Maozhen, Wang Xingyu, and Han Jian, encouraged Li Maozhen, Wang, and Han to march on the capital Chang'an. Once the three warlords arrived in Chang'an, they put Li Xi and his fellow chancellor Wei Zhaodu to death.

== Background and early career ==
It is not known when Li Xi was born. His family claimed to be descended from the Warring States period State of Zhao general Li Mu and also claimed ancestry through a line of officials of Qin dynasty, Han dynasty, and Jin dynasty (266–420). His grandfather Li Yong was briefly chancellor during the reign of Emperor Xianzong, but resigned soon after being named chancellor. Li Xi's father Li Shi (李拭) served as a chronicler of the emperor's acts and also served in several other important positions, including military governor (jiedushi) of two different circuits.

Li Xi was considered well-learned and a skillful writer. He passed the imperial examinations in 859, during the reign of Emperor Xianzong's son Emperor Xuānzong, in the Jinshi (進士) class, on his first try. At one point, he was made Hubu Langzhong (戶部郎中), a supervisory official at the ministry of census (戶部, Hubu), but had his office at the eastern capital Luoyang, not at the capital Chang'an. He had once submitted a petition accusing the eunuch Hao Jingquan (郝景全) of impropriety, but was instead himself accused of violating naming taboo of Emperor Xianzong's father Emperor Shunzong (who was named Li Song) by using the character Song (訟, a different character than Emperor Shunzong's name) in his petition; he was initially punished by having part of his salary withheld. Li Xi submitted another petition, pointing out that the phrase he used was used in imperial edicts of the past and that he should not be punished for quoting imperial edicts; the punishment against him was then reversed.

When the major agrarian rebel Huang Chao captured Luoyang in 879, by which time Emperor Xuānzong's grandson Emperor Xizong was emperor, Li Xi took eight seals used by the executive bureau of government (尚書省, Shangshu Sheng), crossed the Yellow River, and fled to Heyang (河陽, in modern Luoyang, Henan). The defender of Luoyang, Liu Yunzhang (劉允章), who had surrendered to Huang Chao, sent messengers to Li Xi demanding the seals; Li Xi refused to yield them. This made Liu realize that he should not submit to Huang either, and he subsequently repudiated his allegiance to Huang. At a later point, when Li Yun the Prince of Xiang challenged Emperor Xizong for the throne in 886, Li Xi happened to be staying away from the warfare in Huainan Circuit (淮南, headquartered in modern Yangzhou, Jiangsu), and he tried, in vain, to persuade Huainan's military governor Gao Pian not to recognize Li Yun as emperor. At a later point, Li Xi was recalled to Chang'an to serve at Zhongshu Sheren (中書舍人), a mid-level official at the legislative bureau (中書省, Zhongshu Sheng), as well as imperial scholar (翰林學士, Hanlin Xueshi). At a later point, he resigned and retired to Huayin, but was yet later recalled to again serve as imperial scholar.

== Failed attempt at chancellorship and subsequent chancellorship ==
In 894, by which time Emperor Xizong's brother and successor Emperor Zhaozong was emperor, Li Xi was serving as the chief imperial scholar (翰林學士承旨, Hanlin Xueshi Chengzhi), when Emperor Zhaozong made him a chancellor with the designation Tong Zhongshu Menxia Pingzhangshi (同中書門下平章事). However, the chancellor Cui Zhaowei disliked Li Xi and feared that Li Xi would divert his power, and therefore persuaded the imperial official Liu Chonglu (劉崇魯) into disrupting the public declaration — by stepping out into the open at the imperial gathering, bearing mourning clothes and weeping. Liu publicly stated that Li Xi was wicked and had only become imperial scholar because of his relationships with the eunuchs Yang Fugong and Ximen Junsui (西門君遂). Emperor Zhaozong, faced with this public display, cancelled Li Xi's commission and made him Taizi Shaofu (太子少傅), an advisor to the Crown Prince. Li Xi responded by submitting 10 petitions defending himself and accusing Liu of crimes, going as far as writing sharply-worded language that included references to the suicide of Liu's father Liu Fu (劉符) while Liu Fu was being investigated for corruption and accusations that Liu Chonglu and his brother Liu Chongwang were themselves eunuchs' associates. His accusatory petitions did not stop even after Emperor Zhaozong suspended Liu Chonglu. It was said that these petitions were well written, but the public, while recognizing the artfulness of the writing, looked at Li Xi poorly for the bitterness.

However, Emperor Zhaozong still respected Li Xi for his talent, and, in spring 895, again named him chancellor, as well as the deputy minister of census (戶部侍郎, Hubu Shilang). Cui, who was by this point in close alliance with the warlords Li Maozhen the military governor of Fengxiang Circuit (鳳翔, headquartered in modern Baoji, Shaanxi) and Wang Xingyu the military governor of Jingnan Circuit (靜難, headquartered in modern Xianyang, Shaanxi), thereafter falsely stated to Li Maozhen and Wang that fellow chancellor Wei Zhaodu had prevented the bestowing of the highly honorary title of Shangshu Ling (尚書令) on Wang and had recommended Li Xi as chancellor; he further suggested that Wei and Li Xi were in favor of a campaign against Li Maozhen and Wang, just as the deceased chancellor Du Rangneng was. Li Maozhen and Wang thereafter submitted multiple petitions objecting to Li Xi's commission as chancellor. Emperor Zhaozong was forced to placate them by removing Li Xi, making him Taizi Shaoshi (太子少師), also an advisor to the Crown Prince.

== Removal and death ==
However, soon thereafter, Li Maozhen, Wang Xingyu, and their ally Han Jian the military governor of Zhenguo Circuit (鎮國, headquartered in modern Weinan, Shaanxi), locked in a dispute with Li Keyong the military governor of Hedong Circuit (河東, headquartered in modern Taiyuan, Shanxi), over their contrary recommendations for the military governorship of Huguo Circuit (護國, headquartered in modern Yuncheng, Shanxi) (Li Maozhen, Wang, and Han recommended Wang Gong, while Li Keyong recommended Wang Ke), decided to march on Chang'an to force Emperor Zhaozong to agree to their demands. Once they arrived at Chang'an, they submitted demands to Emperor Zhaozong that Li Xi and Wei Zhaodu be executed. Emperor Zhaozong refused, but Li Maozhen, Wang, and Han then executed Li Xi and Wei anyway. Li Xi's son Li Wei (李沇) was also killed. After Li Keyong attacked and defeated Wang later that year, Emperor Zhaozong posthumously honored both Li Xi and Li Wei.

It was said that Li Xi was studious and had a large book collection, earning him the nickname of Shulou (i.e., "tower of books"). He was also a prolific writer and annotator. In the aftermaths of his death, however, the collection was lost.

== Notes and references ==
- Old Book of Tang, vol. 157.
- New Book of Tang, vol. 146.
- Zizhi Tongjian, vols. 259, 260.
