= Wang Xingyu =

General of Tang dynasty

Wang Xingyu (Chinese: 王行瑜) (d. 895) was a warlord and general late in the Chinese Tang dynasty who controlled Jingnan Circuit (靜難, headquartered in modern Xianyang, Shaanxi) from 887 to his death in 895. At his prime, Wang Xingyu beheaded Zhu Mei. Also Wang and Li Maozhen the military governor of Fengxiang Circuit (鳳翔, headquartered in modern Baoji, Shaanxi) had a stranglehold on the court of then-reigning Emperor Zhaozong, and were able to put two former chancellors that they disliked—Li Xi and Wei Zhaodu—to death over Emperor Zhaozong's objections. However, Li Keyong the military governor of Hedong Circuit (河東, headquartered in modern Taiyuan, Shanxi) then attacked them and defeated Wang. Wang fled and was killed in flight by his own subordinates.

== Background ==
It is not known when Wang Xingyu was born, but it is known that he was from Bin Prefecture (邠州), the capital of Jingnan Circuit. He became an officer at Jingnan in his youth, and he later contributed under the military governor Zhu Mei when Zhu participated in the campaigns against the major agrarian rebel Huang Chao.

In 886, after then-reigning Emperor Xizong fled from the imperial capital Chang'an to Xingyuan (興元, in modern Hanzhong, Shaanxi) in response to imperial forces' defeat at the hands of Wang Chongrong the military governor of Huguo Circuit (護國, headquartered in modern Yuncheng, Shanxi) and Li Keyong the military governor of Hedong Circuit, Zhu, who had previously been aligned with Emperor Xizong's powerful eunuch advisor Tian Lingzi, turned against Emperor Xizong and supported Emperor Xizong's distant relative Li Yun the Prince of Xiang as a rival emperor. Under Li Yun's regime, Wang Xingyu was given the title of military governor of Tianping Circuit (天平, headquartered in modern Tai'an, Shandong) but never reported there; rather, Zhu sent him to try to attack Emperor Xizong at Xingyuan.

Initially, Wang enjoyed some success when he attacked San Pass (散關, in modern Baoji, Shaanxi), forcing the imperial guard general Yang Sheng (楊晟) to flee to Xing Prefecture (興州, in modern Hanzhong). When he then attacked Yang at Xing, Yang abandoned Xing as well and withdrew to Wen Prefecture (文州, in modern Longnan, Gansu). Emperor Xizong instead sent Li Chan (李鋋) and Li Maozhen to resist Wang at Mount Datang (大唐峰, in modern Hanzhong). Wang was unable to defeat them.

Meanwhile, Tian's successor as the leading eunuch, Yang Fugong, issued a declaration that anyone who killed Zhu would be made the military governor of Jingnan. As Wang feared punishment from Zhu for failing to capture Emperor Xizong, he persuaded his subordinates that they should turn against Zhu. Around the new year 887, Wang made a sudden return to Chang'an with his troops and attacked Zhu, killing him. Li Yun fled to Wang Chongrong's territory but was killed by Wang Chongrong. Subsequently, Emperor Xizong made Wang Xingyu the military governor of Jingnan to succeed Zhu.

== Rule of Jingnan Circuit ==
In 890, Emperor Xizong's younger brother and successor Emperor Zhaozong bestowed on Wang Xingyu the honorary chancellor title of Shizhong (侍中).

After the eunuch Yang Fugong fled to and rebelled at Shannan West Circuit (山南西道, headquartered in modern Hanzhong, Shaanxi) in late 891, along with his adoptive sons/nephews Yang Shouliang the military governor of Shannan West, Yang Shouxin (楊守信, an imperial guard general who fled to Shannan West with Yang Fugong), Yang Shouzhong (楊守忠) the military governor of Jinshang Circuit (金商, headquartered in modern Ankang, Shaanxi), Yang Shouzhen (楊守貞) the military governor of Longjian Circuit (龍劍, headquartered in modern Mianyang, Sichuan), and Yang Shouhou (楊守厚) the prefect of Mian Prefecture (綿州, in modern Mianyang). In spring 892, Wang Xingyu, along with his allies Li Maozhen the military governor of Fengxiang Circuit, Han Jian the military governor of Zhenguo Circuit (鎮國, headquartered in modern Weinan, Shaanxi), Li Maozhen's brother Li Maozhuang (李茂莊) the military governor of Tianxiong Circuit (天雄, headquartered in modern Tianshui, Gansu), and Wang Xingyu's own brother Wang Xingyue (王行約) the military governor of Kuangguo Circuit (匡國, headquartered in modern Weinan), jointly petitioned Emperor Zhaozong to declare a campaign against the Yangs and to make Li Maozhen the commander of the operations. Emperor Zhaozong, concerned that Li Maozhen would be difficult to control if he seized the Yangs' territory, initially refused and ordered them to negotiate a peaceful resolution. Li Maozhen and Wang Xingyu, however, refused to follow the emperor's orders and sent troops to attack Shannan West circuit; Li Maozhen also sent letters to the chancellor Du Rangneng and the chief eunuch Ximen Junsui (西門君遂) disparaging the imperial government. Emperor Zhaozong was forced to grant their request and put Li Maozhen in command of the operations against the Yangs. Subsequently, they defeated the Yangs, and Li Maozhen took effective control of the Yangs' territory. During the operations, Emperor Zhaozong bestowed the honorary chancellor title of Zhongshu Ling (中書令) on Wang Xingyu.

By 893, Li Maozhen and Wang Xingyu were allied with the chancellor Cui Zhaowei, who was secretly informing them all that was happening at Emperor Zhaozong's court. Emperor Zhaozong had, against Du's recommendations, been planning a campaign against Li Maozhen, and Du, despite his opposition, assisted the emperor in planning the campaign. Subsequently, Emperor Zhaozong commissioned the chancellor Xu Yanruo as the new military governor of Fengxiang and put Li Sizhou (李嗣周) the Prince of Qin in command of a newly conscripted imperial army to escort Xu. When Li Sizhou prepared to attack Li Maozhen, his army deserted before it could encounter and engage Li Maozhen's and Wang Xingyu's army. Li Maozhen and Wang Xingyu then approached the capital. Emperor Zhaozong was forced to placate them by executing Ximen, along with the eunuchs Li Zhoutong (李周潼) and Duan Yu (段詡), and forcing Du to commit suicide. It was said that thereafter, Li Maozhen and Wang Xingyu had a stranglehold over the imperial government, and both eunuchs and imperial officials entered into alliances with them. Whatever those allies of theirs wanted, they would report to Li Maozhen and Wang Xingyu; Li Maozhen and Wang Xingyu would then petition the emperor to demand that those actions be carried out, and Emperor Zhaozong would be forced to agree. Later in the year, however, when Wang Xingyu requested the title of Shangshu Ling (尚書令), the chancellor Wei Zhaodu secretly opposed on the account that no one had dared to hold that title ever since Emperor Taizong held that title—not even the great general Guo Ziyi, who was bestowed the title but constantly declined it and never used it. Emperor Zhaozong agreed, and he tried to placate Wang instead by giving him the title of Shangfu (尚父, "imperial father") and bestowing on him an iron certificate, which was supposed to guarantee that he would never be put to death.

In 895, Cui, displeased that Emperor Zhaozong had commissioned Li Xi as a chancellor as well to divert his power, informed Li Maozhen and Wang Xingyu the fact that Wei had opposed Wang's request of the Shangshu Ling title and claimed that Wei and Li Xi were planning, with Emperor Zhaozong, a campaign against them, much like Du was. Li Maozhen and Wang Xingyu thereafter submitted petitions opposing Li Xi's chancellorship. Emperor Zhaozong was forced to remove Li Xi from the chancellor position.

Later in the year, however, another flareup would occur in the relationship between the imperial government and the Li Maozhen/Wang Xingyu/Han alliance. After the recent death of Wang Chongying (Wang Chongrong's brother and successor) the military governor of Huguo Circuit (護國, headquartered in modern Yuncheng, Shanxi), the Huguo soldiers had supported Wang Chongying's nephew Wang Ke (the son of his brother Wang Chongjian (王重簡), but who had been adopted by Wang Chongrong) as Wang Chongying's successor, but Wang Chongying's son Wang Gong the military governor of Baoyi Circuit (保義, headquartered in modern Sanmenxia, Henan), who had coveted Huguo, persuaded Wang Xingyu, Li Maozhen, and Han to submit a petition recommending that Wang Gong be given Huguo and Wang Ke be given Baoyi. Emperor Zhaozong, citing Li Keyong's support for Wang Ke's succession (as Wang Ke was his son-in-law), refused. Thereafter, Li Maozhen, Wang Xingyu, and Han marched on the capital and put, against Emperor Zhaozong's orders, LI Xi and Wei to death. They then considered deposing Emperor Zhaozong and replacing him with his brother Li Bao (李保) the Prince of Ji. However, at this point, they heard that Li Keyong had mobilized his army and was preparing to march against them, so they, after leaving 2,000 soldiers each at Chang'an to watch over the emperor, returned to their circuits to prepare to defend against Li Keyong.

== Defeat and death ==
Meanwhile, Li Keyong launched his army and issued a harshly-worded declaration against Li Maozhen, Wang Xingyu, and Han Jian, accusing them of wrongly killing Wei Zhaodu and Li Xi. He quickly defeated and killed Wang Gong's brother Wang Yao (王瑤) the prefect of Jiang Prefecture (絳州, in modern Yuncheng), who was allied with Wang Gong in the Wang Gong/Wang Ke dispute. He then crossed the Yellow River and attacked Kuangguo; Wang Xingyue abandoned the circuit and fled to Chang'an. He then put Han's capital Hua Prefecture (華州) under siege.

Meanwhile, the armies that Li Maozhen and Wang Xingyu left at Chang'an got into a fight between themselves, as both Li Maozhen's adoptive son Li Jipeng (李繼鵬), who commanded the Fengxiang soldier, and Wang Xingyue and another brother, Wang Xingshi (王行實), who commanded the Jingnan soldiers, wanted to seize the emperor and take him to their circuit. Emperor Zhaozong, as the two armies were engaging themselves, fled into the Qinling Mountains to avoid being captured. Meanwhile, Li Keyong, hearing that the two circuits were fighting to control the emperor, quickly advanced on Chang'an and forced the two circuits' soldiers to flee back to their own circuits.

Li Keyong then advanced to Jingnan's Liyuan Camp (黎園寨, in modern Xianyang). Hearing of Li Keyong's victory there, Li Maozhen, fearful, executed Li Jipeng and presented his head to Emperor Zhaozong to beg for forgiveness, and also wrote Li Keyong to seek peace. Emperor Zhaozong thus ordered Li Keyong to concentrate on attacking Wang Xingyu. Emperor Zhaozong then declared a general campaign against Wang Xingyu and stripped him of all of his titles. Li Maozhen, despite sending the emissaries to the emperor and Li Keyong, sent troops to aid Wang. Li Keyong thus asked Emperor Zhaozong to extend the campaign to Li Maozhen as well. Emperor Zhaozong disagreed, but issued an edict ordering Li Maozhen to withdraw. By winter 895, Liyuan fell. Wang Xingyue and Wang Xingshi, who were then at Ning Prefecture (寧州, in modern Qingyang, Gansu), abandoned it and fled. After Li Keyong then defeated Wang Xingyu at Longquan Camp (龍泉寨, in modern Weinan), Wang Xingyu fled back to Bin Prefecture and defended it, while sending offers to surrender to Li Keyong. Li Keyong refused. Wang then abandoned Bin Prefecture and fled; he was killed in flight by his own officers; his head was delivered to Chang'an and presented to Emperor Zhaozong. At Li Keyong's recommendations, Emperor Zhaozong commissioned the imperial guard general Su Wenjian (蘇文建) to be the new military governor of Jingnan.

== Notes and references ==
- Old Book of Tang, vol. 175.
- New Book of Tang, vol. 224, part 2.
- Zizhi Tongjian, vols. 256, 258, 259, 260.
