= Yang Shihou =

- Died: 23 April, 915 AD
- Rank: Major General

Yang Shihou (楊師厚) (died April 23, 915), formally the Prince of Ye (鄴王), was a major general of the Chinese Five Dynasties and Ten Kingdoms period state Later Liang, serving as the main obstacle to the expansion of Later Liang's archenemy Jin during latter parts of the reign of Emperor Taizu (Zhu Quanzhong) and the early parts of the reign of Emperor Taizu's son Zhu Zhen.

== During Tang Dynasty ==
=== Background ===
It is not known when Yang Shihou was born, but it is known that he was from Jingou (斤溝, in modern Fuyang, Anhui). In his youth, he served as a soldier under Li Hanzhi, who was then the military governor (Jiedushi) of Heyang Circuit (河陽, headquartered in modern Jiaozuo, Henan). After Li Hanzhi lost his own territory and became a subordinate of Li Keyong the military governor of Hedong Circuit (河東, headquartered in modern Taiyuan, Shanxi) in 888, Li Hanzhi gave, as a tribute to Li Keyong, about 100 elite soldiers, and Yang was one of the soldiers thus sent to join the Hedong army. However, Yang did not distinguish himself while serving under Li Keyong. Later, after he was accused of crimes, he fled to Li Keyong's archenemy Zhu Quanzhong the military governor of Xuanwu Circuit (宣武, headquartered in modern Kaifeng, Henan). Zhu made him an officer in the Xuanwu army and the prefect of Cao Prefecture (曹州, in modern Heze, Shandong).

=== Service under Zhu Quanzhong ===
The first campaign that Yang Shihou was recorded to have clearly participated in was against Zhu Quanzhong's erstwhile vassal Wang Shifan the military governor of Pinglu Circuit (平盧, headquartered in modern Weifang, Shandong), who rose against Zhu in 903 and subsequently received aid from Yang Xingmi the military governor of Huainan Circuit (淮南, headquartered in modern Yangzhou, Jiangsu) in the form of an army commanded by the general Wang Maozhang. Subsequently, though, Wang Maozhang realized that the Huainan/Pinglu joint army was badly outnumbered by the main Xuanwu army, commanded by Zhu himself, and therefore retreated with the Huainan army. Zhu sent Yang Shihou to give chase, and while Yang was able to defeat and kill Wang Maozhang's rearguard commander Li Qianyu (李虔裕), Wang Maozhang's main strength was able to withdraw. Subsequently, Zhu left Yang in charge of sieging Pinglu's capital Qing Prefecture while he himself returned to Xuanwu's capital Daliang. Yang pitched his camp at Linqu (臨朐, in modern Weifang) while claiming that he was heading for Mi Prefecture and leaving the supplies at Linqu; when Wang Shifan, believing that Yang had left for Mi, attacked, he fell into Yang's trap and suffered heavy casualties, with his brother Wang Shike (王師克) captured by Yang; when the army from Pinglu's Lai Prefecture, Yang also defeated them and almost completely slaughtered them, and thereafter maintained a chokehold on Qing Prefecture. Wang Shifan thereafter sent an emissary to offer to surrender to Yang, and Zhu accepted the surrender. For this victory, Yang was made the military governor of Wuning Circuit (武寧, headquartered in modern Xuzhou, Jiangsu).

In 905, Zhu, displeased that Zhao Kuangning the military governor of Zhongyi Circuit (忠義, headquartered in modern Xiangyang, Hubei) was in close communications with two of his enemies — Yang Xingmi and Wang Jian the military governor of Xichuan Circuit (西川, headquartered in modern Chengdu, Sichuan) — sent Yang Shihou to attack Zhongyi, with Zhu himself commanding the follow-up troops. Yang Shihou quickly captured seven of Zhongyi's prefectures — Tang (唐州, in modern Zhumadian, Henan), Deng (鄧州, in modern Nanyang, Henan), Fu (復州, in modern Tianmen, Hubei), Ying (郢州, in modern Jingmen, Hubei), Sui (隨州, in modern Suizhou, Hubei), Jun (均州, in modern Shiyan, Hubei), and Fang (房州, also in modern Shiyan) — and then rendezvoused with Zhu just north of the Han River. Under Zhu's orders, Yang built floating bridges across the Han, allowing Zhu's army to cross. When Zhao's army put up a defense on the southern bank of the Han River, Yang defeated him and advanced to his capital Xiang Prefecture (襄州). Zhao thereafter abandoned Xiang Prefecture and fled to Huainan. Zhu commissioned Yang as the acting military governor of Shannan East Circuit (山南東道, i.e., Zhongyi, reverting to an older name) and ordered him to attack Jingnan Circuit (荊南, headquartered in modern Jingzhou, Hubei), ruled by Zhao's brother Zhao Kuangming. Zhao Kuangming, hearing of Zhao Kuangning's defeat, fled to Xichuan, and Zhao Kuangming's officer Wang Jianwu (王建武) surrendered to Yang. Zhu made He Gui the acting military governor of Jingnan and Yang the full military governor of Shannan East.

== During Later Liang ==
=== During Emperor Taizu's reign ===
In 907, Zhu Quanzhong had Tang's last emperor, Emperor Ai, yield the throne to him, ending Tang and starting a new Later Liang as its Emperor Taizu. In 909, Emperor Taizu recalled Yang Shihou from Shannan East, commissioning him as the commander of the forces preparing to attack Lu Prefecture (潞州, in modern Changzhi, Shanxi), which was then ruled by Later Liang's archrival Jin (i.e., the state ruled by Li Keyong's son and successor Li Cunxu). He sent Wang Ban (王班) to Shannan East to serve as acting military governor in Yang's absence. (As Yang departed Xiang Prefecture, he warned Wang Ban that certain officers, including one Wang Qiu (王求), were unruly and might mutiny in his absence; Wang Ban took no precautions, however, and later in the year Wang Qiu assassinated Wang Ban and rebelled, but the rebellion was quickly put down.)

Soon after Yang departed Xiang Prefecture, though, before the army could be launched to attack Lu, Liu Zhijun the military governor of Zhongwu Circuit (忠武, headquartered in modern Weinan, Shaanxi), rebelled against Emperor Taizu and submitted to Li Maozhen the Prince of Qi. Emperor Taizu thereafter sent Yang, assisted by Liu Xun, to attack Liu Zhijun. Liu Xun quickly captured Tong Pass, and when Yang advanced to Hua Prefecture (華州, in modern Weinan as well), Liu Zhijun's subordinate Nie Shang (聶賞) surrendered it to Yang. Liu Zhijun panicked, abandoned Zhongwu's capital Tong Prefecture (同州), and fled to Qi territory. Yang subsequently attacked the former imperial capital Chang'an, which Liu Zhijun had seized and turned control over to Qi troops; he circled around to the city's west side and fought into the city, defeating Qi troops and retaking the city. For his contributions, Emperor Taizu gave him the title of acting Taiwei (太尉, one of the Three Excellencies).

Later in the year, Li Maozhen sent Liu Zhijun to attack Later Liang's Shuofang Circuit (朔方, headquartered in modern Yinchuan, Ningxia). As part of the operation, Li Maozhen asked Li Cunxu to attack Later Liang's Jin (晉州, in modern Linfen, Shanxi) and Jiang (絳州, in modern Yuncheng, Shanxi) Prefectures. Li Cunxu sent his general Zhou Dewei to do so and followed Zhou himself. Yang, however, defeated Zhou, and forced the Jin forces, which were then sieging Jin Prefecture, to withdraw. Emperor Taizu subsequently made him the military governor of Zhenguo Circuit (鎮國, headquartered in modern Sanmenxia, Henan).

In 910, Qi and Jin jointly attacked Later Liang's Dingnan Circuit (定難, headquartered in modern Yulin, Shaanxi). Dingnan's military governor Li Renfu sought aid from the Later Liang imperial government, and Emperor Taizu sent Yang and Kang Huaizhen (康懷貞) to head west to attack Qi, but even before they headed west, Emperor Taizu sent the officers Li Yu (李遇) and Liu Wan (劉綰) to head toward Dingnan's capital Xia Prefecture (夏州). When Li Yu and Liu Wan arrived there, the Qi and Jin forces withdrew. Thereafter, Emperor Taizu sent Yang and Li Si'an (李思安) to Ze Prefecture (澤州, in modern Jincheng, Shanxi) to make new preparations to attack Lu Prefecture. Soon thereafter, though, with Emperor Taizu sending Wang Jingren to head a task force, with Han Qing (韓勍) and Li Si'an serving under Wang, to prepare to forcibly seize vassals Wushun Circuit (武順, headquartered in modern Shijiazhuang, Hebei, also known as Zhao and Yiwu Circuit (義武, headquartered in modern Baoding, Hebei), he sent Yang back to Zhenguo Circuit.

When Wushun's military governor Wang Rong the Prince of Zhao found out about the Later Liang plan — i.e., when the Later Liang officers Du Tingyin (杜廷隱) and Ding Yanhui (丁延徽) seized Wushun's Shen (深州) and Ji (冀州) Prefectures (both in modern Hengshui, Hebei) by trick — both he and Wang Chuzhi the military governor of Yiwu turned against Later Liang and allied themselves with Jin. A joint Jin/Zhao/Yiwu army, under Li Cunxu, thereafter defeated Wang Jingren in spring 911 at Boxiang (柏鄉, in modern Shijiazhuang) and crushed the Later Liang army; Li Cunxu then postured to attack south, heading toward Later Liang's Tianxiong Circuit (天雄, headquartered in modern Handan, Hebei). Emperor Taizu removed the title of commander of the northern armies from Wang and bestowed it on Yang, sending him to Heyang Circuit to collect the fleeing troops. After he did, he headed north toward Xing Prefecture (邢州, in modern Xingtai, Hebei), where the Later Liang general Wang Tan (王檀) was under Jin/Zhao siege, and Tianxiong's capital Wei Prefecture (魏州), also under Jin/Zhao attack. When Yang's army reached those two prefectures, the Jin/Zhao army withdrew (as Li Cunxu was concerned Liu Shouguang the military governor of Lulong Circuit (盧龍, headquartered in modern Beijing) would attack him from the rear). Emperor Taizu subsequently stationed Yang with 30,000 men at Xing Prefecture. He also made Yang the military governor of Xuanyi Circuit (宣義, headquartered in modern Anyang, Henan).

After Liu Shouguang declared himself emperor of a new state of Yan in late 911, Li Cunxu sent Zhou to attack Yan, along with the Zhao officer Wang Deming and the Yiwu officer Cheng Yan (程巖). Liu Shouguang sought aid from Later Liang, and in spring 912, Emperor Taizu, wanting to avenge the defeat at Boxiang, headed north himself and ordered, as part of the operations, Yang and Li Zhouyi (李周彝) to siege Zaoqiang (棗強, in modern Hengshui). After Zaoqiang fell, Yang, under Emperor Taizu's orders, slaughtered the entire population. Emperor Taizu then sent Yang to Xiu County (蓨縣, in modern Hengshui) to help He Delun (賀德倫) in sieging it. During the siege, however, the Jin general Li Cunshen launched a surprise attack on the main Later Liang army under Emperor Taizu with only 500 men but pretending to be a much larger army under Li Cunxu, causing Emperor Taizu to panic and withdraw back to Tianxiong Circuit.

=== During Zhu Yougui's reign ===
Later in the year, after Emperor Taizu returned to then-capital Luoyang, his son Zhu Yougui the Prince of Ying, believing that he was about to designate an older adoptive son, Zhu Youwen the Prince of Bo, as his heir, assassinated him. Zhu Yougui then blamed the assassination on Zhu Youwen and executed him, and then claimed imperial title. At that time, Yang was still at Wei Prefecture. He had long had designs on taking the circuit over from its young military governor Luo Zhouhan, but did not dare to do so while Emperor Taizu was alive. Hearing that Emperor Taizu was dead, he acted, killing Luo's chief of staff Pan Yan (潘晏), and then taking over the circuit. Zhu Yougui, not daring to challenge him, made him the military governor of Tianxiong and Luo the military governor of Xuanyi.

Once Yang took over Tianxiong, he began to disregard Zhu Yougui's orders. Zhu Yougui feared him, and therefore wanted to test him by summoning him to Luoyang. While Yang's own staff members believed this to be a trick, Yang himself was not apprehensive of Zhu Yougui, believing Zhu Yougui to be incapable of acting against him. He went to Luoyang to meet Zhu Yougui, who conversed with him humbly and awarded him much treasure, before sending him back to Tianxiong. Around the same time, Wang Deming attacked and captured Zongcheng (宗城, in modern Xingtai); Yang laid an ambush for him at Tangdian (唐店, in modern Xingtai), however, and defeated him.

Soon after taking the throne, Zhu Yougui began to lose control over the army, and his younger brother Zhu Youzhen the Prince of Jun, who was then at Daliang, began to conspire with his brother-in-law Zhao Yan and his cousin Yuan Xiangxian against him. At Zhao's advice, Zhu Youzhen sent a secret emissary to Yang to solicit his support. Yang initially was inclined to refuse, believing that as someone who had already pledged loyalty to Zhu Yougui that he should not turn against Zhu Yougui, but his subordinates pointed out that Zhu Yougui had committed patricide and did not deserve loyalty; they also pointed out that Yang would be putting himself in a difficult position if Zhu Youzhen succeeded anyway. Yang therefore agreed, sending his officer Wang Shunxian (王舜賢) to Luoyang to discuss the details further with Zhao and Yuan. In spring 913, Yuan rose with the palace guards and surrounded the palace; Zhu Yougui committed suicide. Zhu Youzhen then claimed the throne at Daliang and moved the capital there. (He also changed his name to Zhu Zhen.)

=== During Zhu Zhen's reign ===
Zhu Zhen created Yang Shihou the Prince of Ye and gave him the honorary chancellor title Zhongshu Ling (中書令); he further showed Yang respect by not referring to him by name, but only by his offices. It was said that from this point on, Yang became extremely arrogant, refusing to submit revenues to the Later Liang imperial government any more and building an elite Yinqiang Xiaojie Corps (銀槍效節都), wanting to again build Tianxiong into an effective independent realm.

Later in 914, with Liu Shouguang in dire straits under siege by the Jin/Zhao/Yiwu army, Yang headed north with Liu Shouguang's brother Liu Shouqi (劉守奇), pillaging Zhao territory. This failed to save Liu Shouguang, however, as his capital You Prefecture (幽州) fell to Li Cunxu later in the year, ending Yan. After Li Cunxu annexed Yan lands, he then headed south with Wang Rong, Zhou Dewei, and his cousin Li Sizhao the military governor of Zhaoyi Circuit (昭義, headquartered at Lu Prefecture) to attack Xing Prefecture. When Yang advanced to try to save Xing Prefecture, however, the Jin/Zhao army withdrew.

Yang died in spring 915, and was given posthumous honors. (After his death, Zhu Zhen would try to curb the Tianxiong army's power by trying to divide it into two circuits, with disastrous results — with the Tianxiong army kidnapping He Delun (whom he made the military governor of Tianxiong) and forcing He Delun to submit to Jin, leading Later Liang's losing the remainder of its territory north of the Yellow River.)

== Notes and references ==
- History of the Five Dynasties, vol. 22.
- New History of the Five Dynasties, vol. 23.
- Zizhi Tongjian, vols. 264, 265, 267, 268, 269.
