= Liu Zhijun (Later Liang) =

Chinese general (died c. 918)

Liu Zhijun (Chinese: 劉知俊; died January 21, 918?), courtesy name Xixian (希賢), nicknamed Liu Kaidao (劉開道, "Liu who opened the way"), was a general under Zhu Wen (Zhu Quanzhong) while Emperor Taizu was a major warlord during the late Tang dynasty and then during Emperor Taizu's reign in his new Later Liang. Later, fearing that Emperor Taizu was going to act against him, he defected, first to Qi, then to Former Shu. Former Shu's emperor Wang Jian (Emperor Gaozu), however, also was apprehensive of his talent and later had him executed.

== During the Tang dynasty ==
It is not known when Liu Zhijun was born, but it is known that he was from Pei County. It was said that he had a handsome appearance and had great ambitions. He initially served under Shi Pu the military governor (Jiedushi) of Ganhua Circuit (感化, headquartered in modern Xuzhou, Jiangsu), and was highly regarded by Shi. However, his bravery and good use of tactics eventually caused Shi to be apprehensive of him. Around the new year 892, he submitted to Zhu Quanzhong the military governor of Xuanwu Circuit (宣武, headquartered in modern Kaifeng, Henan), who was then engaged in a lengthy campaign against Shi. It was said that Liu's surrender to Zhu was a big blow to the Ganhua army, which from that point on was no longer able to stand up against Xuanwu. (Ganhua's capital Xu Prefecture (徐州) would eventually fall to Zhu's army in 893, and Shi committed suicide.) Zhu put the two Yisheng armies (義勝軍) under Liu's command, and made him "Kaidao Commander" (開道指揮使, "the commander who opens the way"), thus leading to Liu's receiving the nickname of "Liu Kaidao." He later successively served as the prefect of Hai Prefecture (海州, in modern Lianyungang, Jiangsu), Huai Prefecture (懷州, in modern Jiaozuo, Henan), and Zheng Prefecture (鄭州, in modern Zhengzhou, Henan).

In 901, the powerful eunuchs, led by Han Quanhui, feared that then-reigning Emperor Zhaozong and the chancellor Cui Yin were about to slaughter them. They therefore seized Emperor Zhaozong and took him from the capital Chang'an to Fengxiang Circuit (鳳翔, headquartered in modern Baoji, Shaanxi), then ruled by the eunuchs' ally Li Maozhen. Cui summoned Zhu, who subsequently put Fengxiang's capital Fengxiang Municipality under siege. However, the siege stalled, and Zhu was unable to capture Fengxiang for a long duration. As of fall 902, with his army facing rains and the accompanying illnesses, Zhu was considering lifting the siege and withdrawing to Hezhong (河中, in modern Yuncheng, Shanxi). Only at the urging by Liu and Gao Jichang did Zhu maintain the siege. (Subsequently, at Gao's suggestion, Zhu had a soldier surrender to Li and falsely claim that the Xuanwu forces were withdrawing. Li came out of Fengxiang and tried to attack Zhu's "withdrawing" army, and was trapped; he was only able to get back into Fengxiang with heavy losses. Li eventually slaughtered the eunuchs and surrendered the emperor to Zhu in spring 903 to sue for peace.)

In spring 904, after Zhu had Cui killed (after suspecting Cui of turning against him), he further forced Emperor Zhaozong to move the capital from Chang'an to Luoyang. In the aftermaths, Zhu made Han Jian the military governor of Youguo Circuit (佑國, headquartered at Chang'an) and Liu the military governor of Kuangguo Circuit (匡國, headquartered in modern Weinan, Shaanxi), to defend against potential attacks from Li Maozhen and Li Maozhen's adoptive son Li Jihui the military governor of Jingnan Circuit (靜難, headquartered in modern Xianyang, Shaanxi). In 906, when Li Jihui, along with the forces of Fengxiang and three other circuits then under Li Maozhen's control — Baosai (保塞, headquartered in modern Yan'an, Shaanxi), Zhangyi (彰義, headquartered in modern Pingliang, Gansu), and Baoda (保大, headquartered in modern Yan'an as well) — attacked Dingnan Circuit (定難, headquartered in modern Yulin, Shaanxi), Dingnan sought aid from Zhu. Zhu ordered Liu and Kang Huaizhen (康懷貞) to aid Dingnan. Liu first attacked Baoda, capturing Liu Yanhui (劉彥暉) the prefect of Baoda's Fang Prefecture (坊州, in modern Yan'an), and then defeated Li Jihui at Meiyuan (美原, in modern Weinan), forcing Li Jihui to withdraw back to Jingnan's capital Bin Prefecture (邠州). Liu Zhijun and Kang then attacked and captured Baoda's capital Fu Prefecture (鄜州) and Baosai's capital Yan Prefecture (延州), as well as three other prefectures. It was said that this was a huge blow to Li Maozhen's army. Liu was rewarded with the honorary chancellor designation of Tong Zhongshu Menxia Pingzhangshi (同中書門下平章事), while Kang was made the military governor of Baoda.

== As Later Liang general ==
In 907, Zhu Quanzhong had Emperor Zhaozong's son and successor Emperor Ai yield the throne to him, ending the Tang dynasty and starting a new Later Liang with him as its Emperor Taizu. A number of regional warlords refused to recognize him as their emperor and whose domains effectively became independent states — including Li Maozhen (whose state became known as Qi as his title was Prince of Qi), Li Keyong the military governor of Hedong Circuit (河東, headquartered in modern Taiyuan, Shanxi) (whose state became known as Jin as his title was Prince of Jin), Yang Wo the military governor of Huainan Circuit (淮南, headquartered in modern Yangzhou, Jiangsu) (whose title was Prince of Hongnong but whose state was also known as Wu as his father and predecessor Yang Xingmi was the Prince of Wu) and Wang Jian (whose state became known as Former Shu as his title was Prince of Shu and he soon thereafter claimed the title of emperor himself).

One of the campaigns the new Later Liang emperor launched thereafter was an attack against Jin's Zhaoyi Circuit (昭義, headquartered in modern Changzhi, Shanxi), which was then governed by Li Keyong's adoptive nephew Li Sizhao. Later Liang forces put Zhaoyi's capital Lu Prefecture (潞州) under siege, and Li Keyong, who was seriously ill, was initially unable to dispatch a relief force. (Li Keyong would die shortly after and be succeeded by his son Li Cunxu.) Still, in spring 908, with the Liang commander Li Si'an (李思安) unable to capture Lu Prefecture, Emperor Taizu went to the frontline himself to oversee the siege, while also summoning Liu from Kuangguo (which, shortly after, Emperor Taizu renamed Zhongwu (忠武), swapping the name with the circuit headquartered in modern Xuchang, Henan) to command the forces involved in the Lu operation. Liu had initial successes against Jin forces and requested to stay to finish the siege, but Emperor Taizu was concerned that Qi forces might attack Zhongwu, so he had Liu head over to Jin Prefecture (晉州, in modern Linfen, Shanxi) to stay there and gradually return to Zhongwu. Soon thereafter, a surprise attack by Li Cunxu and his general Zhou Dewei defeated the Later Liang troops sieging Lu Prefecture, and, in the aftermaths of the victory, Zhou tried to take Ze Prefecture (澤州, in modern Jincheng, Shanxi) as well. The Later Liang general Niu Cunjie (牛存節) held out, and Liu dispatched his own forces from Jin Prefecture to aid Niu, causing Zhou to abandon the attack on Ze and withdraw.

In fall 908, Former Shu and Qi forces attacked Chang'an, and Jin forces under Zhang Chengye were also set to join the battle. Liu and Wang Chongshi (王重師) the military governor of Youguo Circuit (who had replaced Han Jian), however, defeated Qi forces at Mu Valley (幕谷, in modern Xianyang), and the Former Shu and Jin forces also thereafter withdrew. Shortly after, the Qi military governor of Baosai, Hu Jingzhang (胡敬璋), attacked Shangping Pass (上平關, in modern Lüliang, Shanxi), but was repelled by Liu. (This incident implied that Liu's and Kang Huaizhen's capture of Yan Prefecture in 904 did not permanently hold the prefecture for Later Liang at that point.)

Late in 908, Hu died and was succeeded by Liu Wanzi (劉萬子), who, however, was cruel and unpopular, and Li Jihui also thought that Liu Wanzi was in communications with Later Liang. He therefore had the officer Li Yanshi (李延實) assassinate Liu Wanzi and take over Baosai. In response, Liu Wanzi's officer Gao Wanxing (高萬興) and his brother Gao Wanjin (高萬金) surrendered to Liu Zhijun. Shortly after, Liu Zhijun put Yan Prefecture under siege himself and sent Liu Ru (劉儒) to siege Fang Prefecture. Li Yanshi then surrendered to Liu Zhijun, while Qi's military governor of Baoda, Li Yanbo (李彥博), and Li Yanyu (李彥昱) the prefect of Fang Prefecture abandoned their posts and fled back to Fengxiang. Emperor Taizu commissioned Gao Wanxing as the military governor of Baosai and Niu as the military governor of Baoda, while ordering Liu to try to further conquer Jingnan Circuit. Liu believed that it would be difficult to do so, so he declined by stating that his food supplies were not sufficient, so Emperor Taizu let him return to Zhongwu.

Meanwhile, although Emperor Taizu favored Liu greatly, Liu was becoming fearful of Emperor Taizu's increasingly erratic and cruel acts against other generals. He became particularly alarmed in summer 909, when Emperor Taizu, on false reports by the officer Liu Han (劉捍) that Wang Chongshi was in secret communications with Qi, forced Wang to commit suicide and slaughtered his family, replacing him with Liu Han. Later in summer 909, when Emperor Taizu was considering putting Liu Zhijun in command of another campaign against Jin, he summoned Liu to him. This alarmed Liu, and his brother Liu Zhiwan (劉知浣), who was one of Emperor Taizu's guard commanders at Luoyang, also sent a secret letter to Liu Zhijun, opining that Emperor Taizu intended to kill him. Shortly after, Liu Zhiwan requested to take his brothers and nephews to welcome Liu Zhijun, and Emperor Taizu agreed. Shortly after, Liu Zhijun submitted to Qi and launched a surprise attack on Chang'an, capturing Liu Han and delivering him to Qi to be executed. He then put a defense in at Tong Pass while requesting aid from both Qi and Jin. Despite Liu Zhijun's rebelling against him, Emperor Taizu initially tried to maintain communications with Liu Zhijun, and his emissary to Liu Zhijun pointed out the great favors he had shown to Liu. Liu responded that while he was appreciative, he was fearful of the same fate as Wang. Even though Emperor Taizu then sent another communique stating that Liu was correct to have had Liu Han killed and that he regretted the death of Wang, Liu Zhijun did not respond again, so Emperor Taizu sent Yang Shihou and Liu Xun to attack Liu Zhijun. Liu Xun quickly captured Tong Pass and took Liu Zhiwan and the other family members, who were on the way to Liu Zhijun's territory, captive. Still, Emperor Taizu made another attempt to persuade Liu Zhijun to resubmit, by sending his nephew Liu Siye (劉嗣業) to Zhongwu's capital Tong Prefecture (同州) with Emperor Taizu's edict. Liu Zhijun considered going to meet Emperor Taizu alone to apologize, but his brother Liu Zhiyan (劉知偃) opposed. Shortly after, when Liu Zhijun's officer Nie Shang (聶賞) surrendered Hua Prefecture (華州, in modern Weinan) to Yang, Liu Zhijun abandoned Tong Prefecture and fled to Fengxiang. Li Maozhen greatly honored Liu Zhijun, bestowing him the high chancellor title of Zhongshu Ling (中書令), but initially did not make him a military governor, believing that he could not carve territory out for Liu, but granting him a large stipend.

== As Qi general ==
In late 909, Li Maozhen wanted to capture Shuofang Circuit (朔方, headquartered in modern Yinchuan, Ningxia) to accommodate Liu Zhijun. He arranged with Jin forces to attack Jin Prefecture to distract Later Liang, and then sent Liu to attack Shuofang. (The Jin attack on Jin Prefecture, commanded by Zhou Dewei, however, was repelled by the defenders of Jin Prefecture, and when Yang Shihou arrived at Jin Prefecture to aid the defenders, Zhou withdrew.) When Shuofang's military governor Han Xun (韓遜) sought aid from Later Liang, Emperor Taizu sent Kang Huaizhen and Kou Yanqing (寇彥卿) to attack Jingnan Circuit to force Liu to withdraw. Kang and Kou quickly captured Nin (寧州), Yan (衍州), and Qing (慶州, all in modern Qingyang, Gansu) Prefectures. Upon hearing the news, Liu quickly withdrew from Shuofang to engage them. In response, Emperor Taizu also ordered Kang and Kou to withdraw, and, anticipating an attack by Liu against them, sent aid forces to Qing Valley (青谷, in modern Xianyang). When Kang and Kou reached Sanshui (三水, in modern Xianyang), Liu had already laid a trap for them, which they fought through only because of the efforts of Kang's subordinate Wang Yanzhang. Kang subsequently divided his troops into several groups, but each of the groups missed the rendezvous with the aid troops. When they reached Shengping (昇平, in modern Yan'an), they fell into another trap set by Liu. Kang barely escaped with his life but suffered massive casualties. In light of the victory, Li Maozhen commissioned Liu as military governor of Zhangyi Circuit.

In fall 911, the Qi-Former Shu alliance ended over Wang Jian's summoning his daughter Princess Puci, who had married Li Maozhen's nephew Li Jichong (李繼崇) the military governor of Tianxiong Circuit (天雄, headquartered in modern Tianshui, Gansu), back to Former Shu and refusing to return her to Li Jichong. The Former Shu forces were successful in the initial battles. However, Liu and Li Jichong then engaged and defeated the Former Shu generals Tang Daoxi and his adoptive sons Wang Zongkan (王宗侃), Wang Zonghe (王宗賀), and Wang Zongshao (王宗紹) at Qingni Heights (青泥嶺, in modern Hanzhong, Shaanxi), forcing Tang to withdraw to Xingyuan Municipality (興元, in modern Hanzhong) and Wang Zongkan and Wang Zonghe to Anyuan Base (安遠軍, in modern Hanzhong). Liu and Li Jichong put Xingyuan under siege, and the Former Shu forces came close to abandoning Xingyuan and would have but for Tang's fervent opposition. Meanwhile, Wang Jian sent his nephew Wang Zonghui (王宗鐬) and adoptive son Wang Zongbo (王宗播) to aid Xingyuan and Anyuan, and he himself shortly after departed his capital Chengdu to aid them as well. The Former Shu forces' morale were greatly enhanced after Wang Jian's arrival, and Qi forces, after suffering defeats, were forced to withdraw. Thereafter, due to false accusations by Li Maozhen's attendant Shi Jianyong (石簡顒), Li Maozhen stripped Liu of his command, but after Li Jichong pointed out that Liu was an excellent general and should not be suspected, Li Maozhen executed Shi to comfort Liu. Subsequently, at Li Jichong's invitation, Liu relocated his family to Tianxiong's capital Qin Prefecture (秦州).

In 914, Li Jihui was poisoned to death by his son Li Yanlu, who claimed the title of acting military governor of Jingnan and took over the circuit. In 915, Li Jihui's adoptive son Li Baoheng (李保衡) further killed Li Yanlu and surrendered the circuit to Later Liang. Later Liang's Emperor Zhu Zhen commissioned the general Huo Yanwei to be the military governor of Jingnan. Li Maozhen, hearing of what happened, sent Liu to put Bin Prefecture under siege, but with Huo defending the city, Liu could not capture it quickly. Meanwhile, in winter 915, Former Shu forces attacked Tianxiong Circuit and forced Li Jichong to surrender to them. The Former Shu forces took over Tianxiong and took Liu's family back to Chengdu. Liu, hearing the news, ended the siege of Bin Prefecture and returned to Fengxiang, but grew increasingly fearful, so he took 70 soldiers close to him and fled to Former Shu.

== As Former Shu general ==
Wang Jian initially welcomed Liu Zhijun warmly and made him the military governor of Wuxin Circuit (武信, headquartered in modern Suining, Sichuan). In 916, Liu served under Wang Zongbo, who was commanding one of the two prongs of the Former Shu attack against Qi and subsequently participated in a siege of Fengxiang Municipality. However, the siege was hampered by a snowstorm, and Wang Jian subsequently ordered the Former Shu army to withdraw.

In 917, apparently preparation for another attack on Qi, Wang Jian commissioned Liu as the overall commander of the northwest prong of the attack (with Wang Zongkan commanding the northeast prong). However, his subordinates were all Wang Jian's old officers who did not respect him, and it was said that because of this, nothing was being achieved. Wang Jian's close associate Tang Wenyi (唐文扆) was also making accusations against Liu. Further, it was said that those jealous of Liu were spreading a false prophecy stating, "Once the black bull gets out of its encirclement, the brown rope will be broken." (That false prophecy was written in that way because Liu had dark skin color and was born in a Chou (丑) year (i.e., year of the Ox); and Wang's sons/adoptive sons used the generational character Zong (宗), which was a homophone of "brown" (棕), while his grandsons used the generational character Cheng (承), which rhymed with (or perhaps was a homophone of, at that time in history) "rope" (繩, sheng).) Wang Jian himself was also apprehensive of Liu because of his talent, secretly stating to his attendants, "I am getting old. Liu Zhijun is not someone who will follow your orders." Around the new year 918, Wang Jian had Liu arrested and accused him of treason; Liu was subsequently executed by decapitation. However, it appeared that his family was spared, for, later, during the reign of Wang Jian's son and successor Wang Zongyan, Wang Jian's daughter Princess Emei married Liu's son Liu Siyan (劉嗣湮).

== Notes and references ==
- History of the Five Dynasties, vol. 13.
- New History of the Five Dynasties, vol. 44.
- Spring and Autumn Annals of the Ten Kingdoms (十國春秋), vol. 42.
- Zizhi Tongjian, vols. 258, 263, 264, 265, 266, 267, 268, 269, 270.
