= Empress Liu (Li Maozhen's wife) =

Empress Liu (Chinese: 劉皇后; personal name unknown) (877–November 8, 943), formally Lady Dowager Xiande of Qin (秦國賢德太夫人), was the wife of Li Maozhen, the only ruler of the Chinese Five Dynasties and Ten Kingdoms period state Qi. During Li Maozhen's reign as the independent Prince of Qi, she carried the title of empress (even though he never assumed the title of emperor). After he submitted as the vassal of the new Later Tang dynasty, she became known as the Lady of Qin, and later Lady Dowager of Qin after his death.

== Lack of records in official histories ==
Nothing was said about Empress Liu's identity in the official histories of the Five Dynasties and Ten Kingdoms period—the History of the Five Dynasties and the New History of the Five Dynasties. What was mentioned was that after the destruction of the preceding Tang dynasty, Li Maozhen continued to use Tang's era name to show refusal to submit to Later Liang and continued to use the Tang-bestowed title of Prince of Qi. However, he took on much of the trappings of an emperor, including creating an Office of the Prince of Qi that had a large staff and many offices that had imperial government-like titles and creating his wife (who was not named) empress. No other reference was made in his biography in the two official histories about his wife.

== Family history, based on Li Maozhen's and her tombstones ==
What little is known about Empress Liu largely came from the discovery of her and Li Maozhen's tombstones in a 2001 excavation of their joint tomb. Based on the tombstone of Li Maozhen, who died in 924 at the age of 68, he had six sons and four daughters, and, at the time of his death (by which time he was a Later Tang vassal bearing the title of Prince of Qin), his wife Lady Liu was bearing the Later Tang-bestowed title of Lady of Qin.

Lady Liu's tombstone, which referred to her as Lady Dowager Xiande of Qin, gave more information about her, although it gave no personal name. According to her tombstone, she died on November 8, 943 at the age of 66, and that she bore four sons and three daughters for Li Maozhen. The four sons were his oldest Li Congyan, Li Congchang (李從昶), Li Congzhao (李從昭), and Li Jiwei (李繼暐). (The fact that Li Jiwei's name had "Ji" as his generational character rather than "Cong" as his brothers implied that he died before the bestowment of the "Cong" character by Emperor Mingzong of Later Tang in 926.) Her three daughters were not named; the oldest was described as having married a man named Lu (盧) and having died early; the second and third daughters married officers of Fengxiang Circuit (鳳翔, headquartered in modern Baoji, Shaanxi), which made up most of the state of Qi, Han Fang (韓昉) and Zhang Juxun (張居遜), respectively. As for Lady Liu's family itself, she was said to be from Qi Prefecture (i.e., Fengxiang Circuit's capital Fengxiang Municipality). Her great-grandfather was named Liu Sichong (劉思沖); her grandfather was named Liu Ao (劉翱); and her father was named Liu Yuehuang (劉岳皇).

== Notes and references ==
Chinese nobility
Preceded by None (state founded)	Empress of Qi; 907–924	Succeeded by None (state submitted to Later Tang)
Preceded by Empress He of the Tang dynasty	Empress of China (Western Shaanxi); 907–924	Succeeded by Empress Liu of Later Tang
