= Liu Xun (Later Liang) =

Liu Xun (Chinese: 劉鄩) (858-June 10, 921) was a general of the Chinese Five Dynasties and Ten Kingdoms period state Later Liang. He was a key commander of Later Liang forces in its struggle with its archenemy Jin, but, after repeated defeats by the Jin prince Li Cunxu, Liu sought retirement, and was subsequently poisoned to death by the Later Liang emperor Zhu Zhen, who doubted his loyalty.

== During Tang Dynasty ==
=== Background ===
Liu Xun was born in 858, during the reign of Emperor Xuānzong of Tang. His family was from Anqiu (安丘, in modern Weifang, Shandong). His grandfather Liu Shou (劉綬) served as a census administrator for the prefectural government of Mi Prefecture, which Anqiu belonged to, and his father Liu Rong (劉融) served as the Anqiu County magistrate. It was said that Liu Xun was ambitious in his youth, favored the study of military strategies, and studied histories and biographies. Sometime during the Zhonghe era (881-885) era of Emperor Xuānzong's grandson Emperor Xizong, Liu became a low-level officer under Wang Jingwu the military governor of Pinglu Circuit (平盧, headquartered in modern Weifang).

=== Service under Wang Shifan ===
In 889, Wang Jianwu died. The Pinglu soldiers supported his 15-year-old son Wang Shifan to replace him. However, one of his subordinates, Zhang Chan (張蟾) the prefect of Di Prefecture (棣州, in modern Binzhou, Shandong), refused to accept Wang Shifan and requested that then-ruling Emperor Zhaozong (Emperor Xizong's brother and successor) commission a replacement. Emperor Zhaozong thus commissioned the senior official Cui Anqian as the military governor of Pinglu, and Cui went to Di Prefecture to join Zhang in a campaign against Wang Shifan; the sides fought for more than a year. In spring 891, when Wang sent the officer Lu Hong (盧弘) to attack Zhang, Lu instead turned against Wang and prepared to attack him. Wang pretended to be fearful of Lu and offered to surrender the governorship to Lu if Lu would spare him. Lu believed Wang and prepared to return to the Pinglu capital Qing Prefecture (青州) to take over. Wang instead approached Liu Xun, promising to promote him if he could kill Lu; Liu agreed. At a subsequent feast Wang held for Lu upon Lu's arrival, Liu surprised and killed Lu and several of his key followers. Wang then attacked Di himself and killed Zhang; Cui fled back to the imperial capital Chang'an. Emperor Zhaozong then commissioned Wang as full military governor, and Wang made Liu the deputy commander of the Pinglu infantry and cavalry.

In 901, the powerful eunuchs led by Han Quanhui, fearing that Emperor Zhaozong and the chancellor Cui Yin were about to slaughter them, forcibly seized Emperor Zhaozong and took him to Fengxiang Circuit (鳳翔, headquartered in modern Baoji, Shaanxi), then ruled by the eunuchs' ally Li Maozhen. Cui summoned his ally, the warlord Zhu Quanzhong the military governor of Xuanwu Circuit (宣武, headquartered in modern Kaifeng, Henan) to attack Fengxiang. Zhu put Fengxiang's capital Fengxiang Municipality under siege, and by 903, the city was in desperate straits, with the people resorting to cannibalism. Han had Emperor Zhaozong issue an edict ordering all the regional governors throughout the empire to attack Zhu. When Wang, who had been a long-time vassal of Zhu Quanzhong's, received the edict, he wept, and with the retired chancellor Zhang Jun also writing him to urge him to act, he decided to send his officers to various cities throughout Zhu's territory to try to simultaneously rise and try to take control of the cities. However, most of the officers he sent failed in their surprise risings and were captured, except Liu, who was able to first send his soldiers disguised as oil merchants into Yan Prefecture (兗州, in modern Jining, Shandong), the capital of Taining Circuit (泰寧), to survey the situation, and then made a night time attack, seizing the city. At that time, Taining's military governor Ge Congzhou, a general under Zhu, was stationed at Xing Prefecture (邢州, in modern Xingtai, Hebei). Liu, after he took over the city, went to greet Ge's mother and treated her, as well as Ge's wife and other family members, with respect.

Zhu reacted by sending Ge to rendezvous with his nephew Zhu Youning (朱友寧) to attack Wang. Soon thereafter, with aid forces that Wang was trying to send Liu being cut off by Zhu Youning and with Li Maozhen's having sued for peace by surrendering the emperor to Zhu, Ge put Yan Prefecture under siege. Liu had Ge's mother ascend the city walls to inform Ge that Liu had treated her well, and Ge, as a result, slowed down the siege. Liu also reduced the rate of supply attrition by sending the women and the old or weak men out of the city, defending it with the stronger men alone. It was said that during the siege, Liu shared his clothes and food with the men under him and adhered to strict discipline, such that the remaining people were able to continue their livelihoods, untroubled by the soldiers. However, with the outside aid cut off, his deputy Wang Yanwen (王彥溫) descended out of the city walls to surrender to Ge; many soldiers followed Wang out. Liu reacted by sending an emissary to Wang Yanwen to state, "Except for the soldiers you are taking under our plan, do not take any extra ones." He also declared to his own army, "You soldiers who go on your own without having been ordered to follow the deputy military governor will have your families slaughtered!" The soldiers were confused and did not dare to follow Wang in deserting, and the Xuanwu army, believing Wang to be part of a trickery, executed him. The city's defenses held. However, with Wang Shifan's own strength waning, Ge tried to persuade Liu to surrender. Liu pointed out that he was sent by Wang and that he should not surrender unless Wang ordered him to do so. When Wang eventually surrendered to Zhu himself and wrote Liu to tell him to surrender, Liu did.

=== Service under Zhu Quanzhong ===
Ge Congzhou held a feast for Liu Xun for him to be prepared to be sent to Xuanwu's capital Bian Prefecture (汴州), and prepared good clothes for Liu. However, Liu, believing that he needed to show humility before Zhu Quanzhong, opted to wear clothes fit for those waiting for punishment and to ride a donkey. When he met Zhu, Zhu gave him good clothes (which he again declined) and invited him to drink. When Liu stated that he did not have the capacity (for alcohol), Zhu responded, "But when you captured Yan Prefecture, what great capacity you showed!" He made Liu the commander of the Yuancong Corps (元從都) of the Xuanwu army — commanding some officers who had followed Zhu for a long time. Liu accepted this post without hesitation, and this impressed Zhu further. Soon thereafter, Zhu made him the acting military governor of Baoda Circuit (保大, headquartered in modern Yan'an, Shaanxi). Liu later became Baoda's military governor, but in 904, as part of Zhu's defensive realignment against a potential joint attack by Li Maozhen, Li Maozhen's adoptive son Li Jihui the military governor of Jingnan Circuit (靜難, headquartered in modern Xianyang, Shaanxi), and Wang Jian the military governor of Xichuan Circuit (西川, headquartered in modern Chengdu, Sichuan), Zhu ordered him to abandon Baoda's capital Fu Prefecture (鄜州) and withdraw with his army to Tong Prefecture (同州, in modern Weinan, Shaanxi). In 905, Liu was made a general of the imperial guards and the commander of the police of then-capital Luoyang (as Zhu had forced Emperor Zhaozong to move the capital from Chang'an there). In 906, when Zhu, who had assassinated Emperor Zhaozong, was made the generalissimo of all armed forces by Emperor Zhaozong's son and successor Emperor Ai, Liu was given the additional post of the commander of the generalissimo's guards.

== During Later Liang ==
=== During Emperor Taizu's reign ===
In 907, Zhu Quanzhong had Emperor Ai yield the throne to him, ending Tang and starting a new Later Liang with him as its Emperor Taizu, but was not recognized by several warlords who continued to wage war with him. In 908, when the general Liu Zhijun, then stationed at Tong Prefecture, rebelled against Emperor Taizu and aligned himself with Qi (i.e., Li Maozhen's state) and Jin (then ruled by Li Cunxu), Liu Zhijun induced Qi forces to seize Chang'an while he himself quickly seized Hua Prefecture (華州, in modern Weinan) and Tong Pass. Emperor Taizu commissioned the general Yang Shihou to attack Liu Zhijun, and Liu Xun served under Yang in this campaign. When Liu Xun reached the east side of Tong Pass, he captured Liu Zhijun's sentry soldiers but let them stay free to serve as his guides, and then had them approach Tong Pass. The soldiers Liu Zhijun sent to defend Tong Pass did not know that the sentry soldiers had turned against them, and opened the pass to welcome them. Liu Xun followed and entered, capturing the pass and taking Liu Zhijun's brother Liu Zhiwan (劉知浣) captive. With Later Liang forces converging on him, Liu Zhijun fled to Qi, and Yang subsequently recaptured Chang'an. Emperor Taizu made Liu Xun the acting military governor of Youguo Circuit (佑國, headquartered at Chang'an). Soon thereafter, Emperor Taizu renamed the circuit to Yong'an Circuit (永安) and made Liu Xun its military governor, as well as the mayor of Da'an Municipality (大安, i.e., Chang'an) and the governor (觀察使, Guanchashi) of Jin Prefecture (金州, in modern Ankang, Shaanxi); he also bestowed the title of acting Situ (司徒, one of the Three Excellencies) on Liu Xun. In 910, Emperor Taizong bestowed the honorary chancellor designation of Tong Zhongshu Menxia Pingzhangshi (同中書門下平章事) and the title of acting Taibao (太保) on him.

=== During Zhu Yougui's reign ===
In 912, Emperor Taizu was assassinated by his son Zhu Yougui the Prince of Ying, who, after blaming the assassination on his adoptive brother Zhu Youwen the Prince of Kang and executing Zhu Youwen, took the throne. Zhu Yougui bestowed the title of acting Taifu (太傅) on Liu Xun. When Liu's mother died in spring 913 and Liu left governmental service briefly to observe a mourning period for her, Zhu Yougui recalled him back to governmental service.

=== During Zhu Zhen's reign ===
==== Rise to greater authority ====
Later in 913, Zhu Yougui's brother Zhu Youzhen the Prince of Jun killed him in a coup and became the new Later Liang emperor (changing his name to Zhu Zhen), and it was said that he trusted Liu Xun even more than Zhu Yougui did. In 914, he recalled Liu from Yongping and made him the mayor of Kaifeng (which Zhu Zhen made the capital), while still maintaining a military governorship — albeit an honorary one, as the military governor of Zhennan Circuit (鎮南, headquartered in modern Nanchang, Jiangxi) as Zhennan then was ruled by Later Liang's rival Wu. With Jin thereafter making an incursion into Later Liang territory, Zhu Zhen stationed Liu at the northern frontier to assist Yang Shihou in defending against Jin, which then withdrew its army.

Late in 914, Zhu Zhen tried to recall Wang Yin (王殷) from the military governorship of Wuning Circuit (武寧, headquartered in modern Xuzhou, Jiangsu) and replace Wang with his brother Zhu Youzhang (朱友璋) the Prince of Fu. Wang, who had been commissioned by Zhu Yougui, was fearful and therefore refused to accept the order, instead submitting to Wu. Zhu Zhen ordered Niu Cunjie (牛存節) and Liu to attack Wuning. When the Wu general Zhu Jin, trying to save Wang, attacked them, they repelled him. They captured Wuning's capital Pengcheng in early 915, and Wang committed suicide.

==== As commander of the Later Liang army against Jin ====
In 915, Yang Shihou died. At the time of Yang's death, he was the military governor of Tianxiong Circuit (天雄, headquartered in modern Handan, Hebei), which had a powerful army and which had thus allowed it to be largely de facto independent of the Tang imperial government for about two centuries. Zhu Zhen's brother-in-law Zhao Yan and secretary Shao Zan (邵贊) thus suggested to him that he divide Tianxiong's six prefectures into two circuits to weaken it, to prevent it slipping out of imperial control again in the future. Zhu Zhen agreed, and he transferred He Delun (賀德倫) the military governor of Pinglu to Tianxiong, but created a new Zhaode Circuit (昭德) to be headquartered at Tianxiong's Xiang Prefecture (相州, in modern Anyang, Henan), to include Xiang, Chan (澶州, in modern Anyang), and Wei (衛州, in modern Xinxiang, Henan) Prefectures, with the official Zhang Yun (張筠) as its military governor. He further ordered that Tianxiong's army be divided in half, with half of the army and half of the circuit treasury be transferred to Zhaode. In order to try to intimidate the Tianxiong army into complying, he also sent Liu Xun with 60,000 men north of the Yellow River, while claiming that Liu's mission was to attack Jin's allies Zhao and Yiwu Circuit (義武, headquartered in modern Baoding, Hebei).

Despite Liu's army's presence, the Tianxiong army, angry and distressed over the order to divide itself, mutinied under the leadership of the officer Zhang Yan (張彥). Zhang put He Delun under house arrest and, when his subsequent request to Zhu Zhen that the division be reversed went unheeded, forced He Delun to write to Li Cunxu to submit Tianxiong to Jin. Li Cunxu's army quickly advanced to Tianxiong's capital Wei Prefecture (魏州, not the same prefecture as the prefecture to be under Zhaode's control), as did Liu's, and the two armies initially stalemated outside the city. (In an ambush, Liu nearly captured Li Cunxu when Li Cunxu was out to survey Liu's army, but Li Cunxu fought out of the ambush with the help from his officer Xia Luqi (夏魯奇).)

Believing that he could not defeat Li Cunxu quickly and wanting to catch Jin by surprise, Liu decided to pretend that his army was still in its camp — by putting flags on the backs of donkeys and having the donkeys walk around in the camp — while he took his army and headed straight into the Taihang Mountains, intending to attack Jin's capital Taiyuan. Several days later, however, Li Cunxu discovered that Liu's camp had in fact been abandoned, and he sent his adoptive brother Li Si'en (李嗣恩) to warn Taiyuan of the impending attack while sending his cavalry to pursue Liu's army. Meanwhile, Liu's army was impeded by rainstorms and illness, and nearly became stuck in the Taihang Mountains, only fighting its way out when Liu pointed out to the soldiers that there was no escape otherwise. Hearing of Liu's movements, Li Cunxu's general Zhou Dewei the military governor of Lulong Circuit (盧龍, headquartered in modern Beijing) also arrived quickly and cut off Liu's access to food supply. When Zhu Zhen sent messengers to rebuke Liu for not engaging the Jin army quickly and leading to the loss of the soldiers and supplies, Liu requested more food supplies from Zhu Zhen to allow him to slow down the Jin army, causing Zhu Zhen to send back a sarcastic rebuke, "You, General, want this much rice. Is it to defeat the enemy, or to fill your stomach?" With his own officers also clamoring for a confrontation with the Jin army, Liu attacked the camp of the soldiers sent by Zhao and Yiwu, believing that they were more easily defeated than the main Jin army, but the Jin generals Li Cunshen (also an adoptive brother of Li Cunxu's) and Li Jianji (李建及) defeated him. (During this, Liu also sent chefs to pretend to surrender to the Jin army, planning to have them poison Li Cunxu to death. This was discovered, however, and the Jin army put the chefs to death.)

After his defeat by Li Cunshen and Li Jianji, Liu went back into his defensive posture, hoping to wear out the Jin army. Li Cunxu, in spring 916, pretended to return to Taiyuan to draw Liu's attention. Liu thereafter decided to attack Wei Prefecture to try to capture it. When he reached the city, however, Li Cunxu was there waiting for him, along with the armies under Li Cunshen and another adoptive brother, Li Siyuan. Liu was surprised, and the Jin army quickly surrounded his. He fought his way out of the trap, but his army, then numbering about 70,000, was nearly completely destroyed. He withdrew to Hua Prefecture (滑州, in modern Anyang, not the same Hua Prefecture Liu had been stationed at years earlier), leaving virtually the entire territory north of the Yellow River in Jin hands.

==== Removal ====
After Liu Xun's defeat by the Jin army, Zhu Zhen summoned him to Kaifeng, but Liu found excuses not to report, apparently fearful of the consequences and ashamed of his defeat. Zhu Zhen, fearing that he would defect to Jin, made him the military governor of Xuanyi Circuit (宣義, headquartered at Hua Prefecture), stationing him at Liyang (黎陽, in modern Anyang). When Li Cunxu attacked Liyang in spring 917, Liu resisted him, and after several days of attacks, Li Cunxu withdrew.

In fall 917, Liu finally went to Kaifeng to pay homage to the emperor. The opinion of the imperial officials at that time was to hold him responsible for the losses to Jin. Zhu Zhen thus stripped him of the honorary Tong Zhongshu Menxia Pingzhangshi title and demoted him to be the military prefect (團練使, Tuanlianshi) of Bo Prefecture (亳州, in modern Bozhou, Anhui).

==== Restoration, retirement, and death ====
In fall 918, Later Liang's military governor of Taining Circuit, Zhang Wanjin (張萬進), believing that Jin army was about to attack south of the Yellow River, defected from Later Liang and submitted to Jin. Zhu Zhen sent Liu Xun to attack Zhang. Liu put Taining's capital Yan Prefecture under siege for more than a year, and Jin was unable to send an army to save Zhang. In winter 919, the city fell. Liu slaughtered Zhang's family. Zhu Zhen made Liu the military governor of Taining and restored him to the honorary Tong Zhongshu Menxia Pingzhangshi title.

In 920, Later Liang's military governor of Huguo Circuit (護國, headquartered in modern Yuncheng, Shanxi), Zhu Youzhen, defected and submitted to Jin. Zhu Zhen commissioned Liu to command an army against Zhu Youqian, with the generals Yin Hao (尹浩), Wen Zhaotu, and Duan Ning serving under him. Liu initially sent Zhu Youqian, to whom he was connected by marriage (one of Liu's children married one of Zhu Youqian's children), a letter urging him to resubmit to Later Liang, but receiving no response, he put Tong Prefecture, which Zhu Youqian had recently seized, under siege. Soon, however, the Jin army under Li Cunshen and Li Sizhao arrived and defeated him, forcing him to withdraw with heavy losses.

After the defeat, Yin and Duan sent accusations to Zhu Zhen, stating their belief that due to the marital connection to Zhu Youqian, Liu intentionally delayed his attack so that the Jin army could come to Zhu Youqian's aid. Meanwhile, Liu himself claimed to be ill and sought to retire. Zhu Zhen agreed and had him retire to Luoyang, but then secretly ordered the defender of Luoyang, Zhang Zongshi, to poison Liu to death. (A slightly different version of the account indicates that Zhang forced Liu to commit suicide.) Despite this, Zhu Zhen still gave Liu posthumous honors. Liu Xun's concubine Lady Wang later became a favorite consort of Li Siyuan's after Li Siyuan became emperor (as Emperor Mingzong) of Later Tang (which Li Cunxu would found in 923 as its Emperor Zhuangzong), and therefore, Liu Xun's sons Liu Suining (劉遂凝) and Liu Suiyong (劉遂雍) continued to gain the Later Tang emperor's favor.

== Notes and references ==
- Old History of the Five Dynasties, vol. 23.
- New History of the Five Dynasties, vol. 22.
- Zizhi Tongjian, vols. 258, 263, 264, 265, 267, 269, 270, 271.
