= Yang Chongben =

Warlord in the late Chinese Tang dynasty and early Five Dynasties and Ten Kingdoms period

Li Jihui (Chinese: 李繼徽) (died 914), né Yang Chongben (楊崇本) (and usually referred to by that name in historical sources), was a Chinese politician and warlord in the late Chinese Tang dynasty and early Five Dynasties and Ten Kingdoms period state Qi, who ruled Jingnan Circuit (靜難, headquartered in modern Xianyang, Shaanxi) as its military governor (Jiedushi).

== Background ==
It is not known when Yang Chongben was born, and the traditional historical sources were explicit in stating that the authors did not know his geographical origin. In his youth, he was adopted by the general Li Maozhen, and so changed his name to Li Jihui. The first historical record of a battle he was involved in was in 897. when he was one of the officers that Li Maozhen, then the military governor of Fengxiang Circuit (鳳翔, headquartered in modern Baoji, Shaanxi), sent to aid his ally Gu Yanhui the military governor of Dongchuan Circuit (東川, headquartered in modern Mianyang, Sichuan) when Gu was under attack by Wang Jian the military governor of Xichuan Circuit (西川, headquartered in modern Chengdu, Sichuan). One that occasion, Li Jihui was defeated by Wang Jian's adoptive son Wang Zongjin (王宗謹).

Later in the year, when Li Jihui was referred to as the military governor of Tianxiong Circuit (天雄, headquartered in modern Tianshui, Gansu), he was commissioned as the military governor of Jingnan Circuit, at Li Maozhen's request.

== As military governor of Jingnan ==
=== During Tang ===
In 901, the powerful eunuchs at the imperial court at Chang'an, led by Han Quanhui, fearing that they would be slaughtered by then-reigning Emperor Zhaozong and the chancellor Cui Yin, forcibly seized Emperor Zhaozong and took him to Fengxiang, as Li Maozhen was an ally to the eunuchs. Cui summoned his ally Zhu Quanzhong the military governor of Xuanwu Circuit (宣武, headquartered in modern Kaifeng, Henan), who then attacked Fengxiang, but after an abortive initial attack, headed north to attack Jingnan. Li Jihui submitted to Zhu, and was allowed to remain as military governor of Jingnan, with his name changed back to the birth name Yang Chongben. Zhu took his wife as hostage and had her taken to Hezhong (河中, in modern Yuncheng, Shanxi), then under Zhu's control.

Zhu subsequently put Fengxiang's capital Fengxiang Municipality under siege. By 903, the city was in desperate straights, and Li Maozhen was forced to sue for peace by slaughtering the eunuchs and surrendering Emperor Zhaozong to Zhu. Zhu thereafter withdrew his army and took Emperor Zhaozong back to Chang'an. During the campaign, he took Yang's family and relocated it to Hezhong. While there, he forced Yang's wife, who was exceeding beautiful, to have sexual relations with him. Unable to bear this violation, she wrote Yang, stating:

My husband displays the banner and axe of a military governor, but cannot protect his wife. I have now become a woman of Lord Zhu. I am too ashamed to face you during this life, and I am prepared for either a knife or a rope [(i.e., she was threatening to commit suicide by one of those means)].

When Yang received her letter, he wept bitterly. After his family, including his wife, was returned to him after Zhu's Fengxiang campaign, he thus resolved to turn against Zhu. He changed his name back to Li Jihui and wrote Li Maozhen as a son, stating, "Tang Dynasty is about to fall. How can you, father, watch its end?" He thereafter joined forces with Li Maozhen and prepared to attack Chang'an, prompting Zhu to forcibly move Emperor Zhaozong to the eastern capital Luoyang in 904 and evacuate the city of Chang'an. Li Jihui, Li Maozhen, and Wang Jian subsequently issued a joint declaration calling for the people of the realm to unite against Zhu, and their declaration, which were echoed by Li Keyong the military governor of Hedong Circuit (河東, headquartered in modern Taiyuan, Shanxi), Liu Rengong the military governor of Lulong Circuit (盧龍, headquartered in modern Beijing), Yang Xingmi the military governor of Huainan Circuit (淮南, headquartered in modern Yangzhou, Jiangsu), and Zhao Kuangning the military governor of Zhongyi Circuit (忠義, headquartered in modern Xiangyang, Hubei), influenced Zhu in resolving to, later in 904, assassinate Emperor Zhaozong and replace him with his son Emperor Ai. He also sent his son Zhu Youyu (朱友裕) to resist them while ordering his officer Liu Xun the military governor of Baoda Circuit (保大, headquartered in modern Yan'an, Shanxi) to abandon Baoda's capital Fu Prefecture (鄜州) and withdraw to Tong Prefecture (同州, in modern Weinan, Shaanxi). In 906, when Li Jihui, along with the forces of Fengxiang and three other circuits then under Li Maozhen's control — Baosai (保塞, headquartered in modern Yan'an, Shaanxi), Zhangyi (彰義, headquartered in modern Pingliang, Gansu), and Baoda — attacked Dingnan Circuit (定難, headquartered in modern Yulin, Shaanxi), Dingnan sought aid from Zhu. Zhu ordered his generals Liu Zhijun and Kang Huaizhen (康懷貞) to aid Dingnan. Liu first attacked Baoda, capturing Liu Yanhui (劉彥暉) the prefect of Baoda's Fang Prefecture (坊州, in modern Yan'an), and then defeated Li Jihui at Meiyuan (美原, in modern Weinan), forcing Li Jihui to withdraw back to Jingnan's capital Bin Prefecture (邠州). Liu Zhijun and Kang then attacked and captured Fu Prefecture and Baosai's capital Yan Prefecture (延州), as well as three other prefectures. It was said that this was a huge blow to Li Maozhen's army.

In 907, Zhu forced Emperor Ai to yield the throne to him, ending Tang and starting a new Later Liang with him as its Emperor Taizu. Li Maozhen (along with Li Keyong, Wang, and Yang Xingmi's son and successor Yang Wo) refused to recognize the new emperor, and effectively made himself the sovereign of a new state of Qi by taking on some imperial trappings, although he continued to carry only the Tang-bestowed title Prince of Qi, not imperial title. Li Jihui remained a vassal of Li Maozhen's.

=== During Qi ===
In 908, Hu Jingzhang (胡敬璋) the military governor of Baosai — which had apparently been recaptured by Qi by that point — died. Li Jihui sent his officer Liu Wanzi (劉萬子) to Baosai to replace Hu. However, Liu, once installed, lost the support of the army by being violent, and was also in communications with Later Liang. Li Jihui had the Baosai officer Li Yanshi (李延實) assassinate Liu and take over Baosai. In reaction, the Baosai officers Gao Wanxing (高萬興) and his brother Gao Wanjin (高萬金) took their soldiers and surrendered to Liu Zhijun. In a subsequent Later Liang attack, Qi was forced to abandon Baosai and Baoda, allowing Later Liang to take over those circuits.

In 914, for reasons lost to history, Li Jihui's son Li Yanlu poisoned him to death and took over the circuit. (In 915, Li Jihui's adoptive son Li Baoheng (李保衡) assassinated Li Yanlu and surrendered to Later Liang, causing Qi to lose Jingnan permanently.)

== Notes and references ==
- History of the Five Dynasties, vol. 13.
- New History of the Five Dynasties, vol. 40.
- Zizhi Tongjian, vols. 261, 262, 264, 265, 267, 269.
