= Li Cunshen =

Tang general

Personal details
- Born: 862 or early 863 likely modern Zhoukou, Henan
- Died: June 16, 924 modern Beijing
- Children: Fu Yanchao (符彥超), son; Fu Yanrao (符彥饒), son; Fu Yanqing, son; Fu Yanneng (符彥能), son; Fu Yanlin (符彥琳), son
- Occupation: Military general, politician, singer
- Father: Fu Chu (符楚)
- Full name: Surname: Fú (符), later changed to Lǐ (李); Given name: Cún (存), later changed to Cúnshěn (存審); Courtesy name: Déxiáng (德詳)

Li Cunshen
- Traditional Chinese: 李存審
- Simplified Chinese: 李存审
Transcriptions
Standard Mandarin
- Hanyu Pinyin: Lǐ Cúnshěn
- Wade–Giles: Li^{3} Ts'un^{2}-shen^{3}

Li Cunshen (李存審; 862 – June 16, 924), né Fu Cun (符存), often referred to in historical sources as Fu Cunshen (符存審), courtesy name Dexiang (德詳), was a Chinese military general, politician, and singer of the Chinese Five Dynasties and Ten Kingdoms period dynasty Later Tang and Later Tang's predecessor state Jin. He was an adoptive son of Jin's first prince Li Keyong and later served in a number of major campaigns under the reign of Li Keyong's son (Li Cunshen's adoptive brother) Li Cunxu, helping Li Cunxu to establish Later Tang as its Emperor Zhuangzong.

== Background ==
Fu Cun was born in 862, during the reign of Emperor Yizong of Tang. His family was from Wanqiu (宛丘, in modern Zhoukou, Henan), and his father Fu Chu (符楚) was an officer for the army of Chen Prefecture (陳州, in modern Zhumadian, Henan), which Wanqiu was a part of. When he was young, there was an occasion when he was to be executed for an offense, and he asked to be buried under a part of the city wall that had tilted, so that his body would not be uncovered. The executioner agreed and was set to move his execution to just next to the city wall to facilitate the burial. However, at that time, a high-level officer was holding a feast and sitting with his favorite servant girl; the officer wanted someone to sing for them during the feast, and the servant girl, who was acquainted with Fu, stated, "Fu Cun often sang for me, and he sang well." The officer sent a messenger to summon Fu, and Fu, with the execution having been moved, was not yet executed. Fu sang well at the feast, and was spared.

== Service under Li Hanzhi ==
Fu Cun was said to be magnanimous and just in his youth, and was capable of military strategies. Late in the Qianfu era (874–879) of Emperor Yizong's son and successor Emperor Xizong, the Tang realm was overrun by agrarian rebels, and Fu led a group of locals in defending the prefecture. Later, when Li Hanzhi, who was also from Chen Prefecture and who had been an agrarian rebel, became a Tang general and was made the prefect of Guang Prefecture (光州, in modern Xinyang, Henan), Fu went to join Li Hanzhi's army. Later, when Li Hanzhi was pressured by the renegade general Qin Zongquan, who had declared himself emperor of a new state centered around nearby Cai Prefecture (蔡州, in modern Zhumadian), Li Hanzhi abandoned Guang Prefecture and joined the army of Zhuge Shuang the military governor (jiedushi) of Heyang Circuit (河陽, headquartered in modern Jiaozuo, Henan), and Fu followed him to serve as a minor officer at Heyang; Fu subsequently distinguished himself in battles against Qin's army. After Zhuge's death, Li Hanzhi was forced by Zhuge's other subordinates to become the defender of Huai Prefecture (懷州, in modern Luoyang, Henan) and Li Hanzhi's soldiers were distributed. Fu thereafter went to the domain of Li Keyong the military governor of Hedong Circuit (河東, headquartered in modern Taiyuan, Shanxi) instead. Li Keyong adopted him as a son and changed his name to Li Cunshen; he became a commander of the wing of Li Keyong's army that Li Keyong put his adoptive sons in charge of.

== Service under Li Keyong ==
As Li Cunshen served under Li Keyong, he was said to draw more and more of Li Keyong's favor due to his bravery in battle and his careful speaking. He often accompanied Li Keyong on his campaigns and distinguished himself during them. During the campaign against Helian Duo, for example, he fought hard and suffered a number of wounds, which Li Keyong personally attended to.

During Li Keyong's 894 campaign against Li Kuangchou the military governor of Lulong Circuit (盧龍, headquartered in modern Beijing), Li Keyong deployed the tactic of facing Li Kuangchou's army headfirst himself, while having Li Cunshen circle around and attack Li Kuangchou's army in the back, leading to a rout of Li Kuangchou's army and Li Kuangchou's subsequent flight and death.

In 895, when Li Keyong, under the directives of Emperor Xizong's brother and successor Emperor Zhaozong, attacked Wang Xingyu the military governor of Jingnan Circuit (靜難, headquartered in modern Xianyang, Shaanxi), Li Cunshen was instrumental in defeating Jingnan's elite troops and capturing Longquan (龍泉寨, in modern Weinan, Shaanxi), leading to Wang's subsequent defeat and death. After the battle, Li Cunshen was given the honorary title of acting Zuo Pushe (左僕射). In a subsequent campaign between Li Keyong and Li Keyong's archrival Zhu Quanzhong the military governor of Xuanwu Circuit (宣武, headquartered in modern Kaifeng, Henan; after Li Hanzhi, who was by that point serving under Li Keyong as well, had seized Zhaoyi Circuit (昭義, headquartered in modern Changzhi, Shanxi), turned against Li Keyong, and submitted to Zhu), Li Cunshen defeated the Xuanwu general He Delun (賀德倫).

In 901, when Zhu launched a major attack on Li Keyong and nearly captured Hedong's capital Taiyuan Municipality, Li Keyong's subordinate Li Tang (李塘) the prefect of Fen Prefecture (汾州, in modern Lüliang, Shanxi) surrendered Fen Prefecture to Zhu; after Zhu's subsequent withdrawal, Li Keyong sent Li Cunshen to attack Li Tang; Li Cunshen took Fen in three days, capturing and executing Li Tang. He was then made the commander of Li Keyong's infantry guards.

In 903, when Wang Jinghui (王敬暉), an officer at Yun Prefecture (雲州, in modern Datong, Shanxi), killed Yun's prefect Liu Zaili (劉再立) and submitted to Liu Rengong the military governor of Lulong (who had been a vassal of Li Keyong's but who had by that point turned against Li Keyong), Li Keyong sent his nephew Li Sizhao and Li Cunshen to attack Wang. When Liu subsequently came to Wang's aid, however, Wang was able to escape; angry over Wang's escape. Li Keyong caned both Li Sizhao and Li Cunshen and stripped them of their posts. However, the posts appeared to have been subsequently restored, as in 906, Li Sizhao and Li Cunshen were the ones attacking Zhaoyi (which had been taken by Zhu's subordinate Ding Hui) and who accepted Ding's surrender (as Ding had by that point become disaffected with Zhu due to Zhu's assassination of Emperor Zhaozong in 905)—by this point, Li Cunshen was apparently the deputy commander of all Han and non-Han cavalry and infantry forces directly under Li Keyong, with Li Sizhao serving as the commander of all Han and non-Han cavalry and infantry forces.

In 907, Zhu forced Emperor Zhaozong's son and successor Emperor Ai to yield the throne to him, ending Tang and starting a new Later Liang with him as its Emperor Taizu. Li Keyong, who carried the Tang-bestowed title of Prince of Jin, refused to recognize the new Later Liang emperor (as did several other major warlords—Yang Wo the Prince of Hongnong, Li Maozhen the Prince of Qi, and Wang Jian the Prince of Shu) and continued to use the Tang era name Tianyou. In effect, however, he was the ruler of his own state of Jin by this point. In 908, Li Keyong died and was succeeded by his son Li Cunxu as the Prince of Jin. Li Cunshen continued to serve under Li Cunxu.

== Service under Li Cunxu ==
=== During Jin ===
One of the first crises that Li Cunxu had to deal with was the siege that Later Liang forces were conducting against Zhaoyi's capital Lu Prefecture (潞州), defended by Li Sizhao. Li Cunxu himself and Zhou Dewei commanded the subsequent successful relief mission to Lu, and Li Cunshen served under Zhou during the battle. After the battle, he was given the honorary title of acting Situ (司徒, one of the Three Excellencies), and made the prefect of Xin Prefecture (忻州, in modern Xinzhou, Shanxi) and the commander of all Han and non-Han cavalry and infantry forces. In 910, he was made acting Taibao (太保) and the deputy overseer of all Han and non-Han. That year, when Li Cunxu himself went to the rescue of the former Later Liang vassal Wang Rong the Prince of Zhao, who was under attack by Later Liang forces, he put Li Cunshen in charge of Taiyuan. After defeating Later Liang forces, Li Cunxu put Li Cunshen in charge of the defense of the new southeastern border between Jin/Zhao and Later Liang, stationed at Zhao Prefecture (趙州, in modern Shijiazhuang, Hebei).

In 912, when Li Cunxu sent Zhou to attack Liu Rengong's son and successor Liu Shouguang—who had declared himself the emperor of a new state of Yan—Later Liang's Emperor Taizu decided to try to come to Liu Shouguang's rescue by attacking Jin and Zhao from the south. Li Cunshen, whose forces were far outnumbered by Later Liang forces under Emperor Taizu himself and his general Yang Shihou, tricked the Later Liang forces by dividing his troops into multiple groups, commanded by himself, Shi Jiantang (史建瑭), and Li Sigong (李嗣肱, another adoptive son of Li Keyong's), eventually misleading Emperor Taizu into believing Li Cunxu and the main Jin forces were at the front and that he was nearing defeat, causing him to withdraw in a panic and ending his attempt to save Yan. As a result of this victory, Li Cunshen was made the military prefect (團練使, Tuanlianshi) of Xin (邢州, in modern Xingtai, Hebei), Ming (洺州, in modern Handan, Hebei), and Ci (磁州, also in modern Handan) Prefectures (which were not yet under Jin control at that time). Later, at Li Cunxu's direction, Li Cunshen took his ethnic Tuyuhun and Qibi (契苾) cavalry soldiers to reinforce Zhou's troops. (Without Later Liang aid, Yan eventually fell in 913.)

Late in 912, Later Liang's Emperor Taizu was assassinated by his son Zhu Yougui the Prince of Ying, and Zhu Yougui took over the throne (after claiming that instead, it was his adoptive brother Zhu Youwen the Prince of Bo who had carried out the assassination but who had been executed). The Later Liang military governor of Huguo Circuit (護國, headquartered in modern Yuncheng, Shanxi), Zhu Youqian, did not believe Zhu Yougui and resisted Zhu Yougui's subsequent summons to the capital Luoyang. When Zhu Yougui subsequently sent the generals Kang Huaizhen (康懷貞) and Niu Cunjie (牛存節) to attack Zhu Youqian, Zhu Youqian submitted to Jin and requested immediate aid. Li Cunxu sent Li Cunshen, Li Sigong, and Li Si'en (李嗣恩, another adoptive son of Li Keyong's) to aid Zhu Youqian; they had some victories over Later Liang forces, and after Li Cunxu himself joined them, Later Liang forces withdrew from Huguo.

In 915, by which time Zhu Yougui had been killed and replaced by his brother Zhu Zhen, Yang, who had been the military governor of the powerful Tianxiong Circuit (天雄, headquartered in modern Handan, also known as Weibo (魏博)), died. Zhu Zhen, believing that the Weibo army was difficult to control and needed to have its influence reduced, divided Tianxiong into two circuits, with three of its six prefectures, including Tianxiong's capital Wei Prefecture (魏州), governed by He Delun, and with the other prefectures made into a new Zhaode Circuit (昭德), headquartered at Xiang Prefecture (相州, in modern Anyang, Henan), with Zhang Yun (張筠) as its military governor. The Tianxiong forces did not want to be divided, and they mutinied under the leadership of Zhang Yan (張彥), kidnapping He Delun and forcing him to submit to Jin. Hearing of what happened at Tianxiong, Li Cunxu proceeded quickly toward Wei Prefecture, joining forces with Li Cunshen to Linqing (臨清, in modern Lintai). Li Cunxu subsequently entered Wei Prefecture and took over the military governorship of Tianxiong himself. Li Cunshen engaged in several subsequent major battles with the Later Liang general Liu Xun, who was trying to recapture Tianxiong, defeating Liu (along with Li Siyuan and Li Cunxu himself). After the Yan Bao (閻寶), the Later Liang military governor of Baoyi Circuit (保義, headquartered at Xing Prefecture) subsequently surrendered the circuit, Li Cunxu made Li Cunshen the military governor of a new Anguo Circuit, headquartered at Xing Prefecture. After the Later Liang military governor of Shunhua Circuit (順化, headquartered in modern Cangzhou, Hebei), Dai Siyuan subsequently abandoned Shunhua, Li Cunxu made Li Cunshen the military governor of Henghai Circuit (橫海, i.e., Shunhua, which was originally named Henghai during Tang times). By this point, Jin had taken all of Later Liang territory north of the Yellow River except for the city of Liyang (黎陽, in modern Hebi, Henan). Li Cunxu subsequently bestowed the honorary chancellor designation of Tong Zhongshu Menxia Pingzhangshi (同中書門下平章事) on Li Cunshen.

The Jin victories were then tempered by the news, in 917, that Khitan's Emperor Taizu (Yelü Abaoji) had launched a major attack on Lulong's capital You Prefecture (幽州), putting Zhou under siege inside the city. Li Cunxu originally hesitated at launching an army to save Zhou, given that the Yellow River border with Later Liang was a new one and Later Liang forces were still in the vicinity. It was at the urging of Li Cunshen, Li Siyuan, and Yan that he decided to send them north to confront Khitan forces. They defeated Khitan forces near You Prefecture and forced them to flee, lifting the siege on You Prefecture. (Still, it was said that this Khitan incursion dealt a heavy blow to Lulong Circuit, which from this point on was periodically subject to damaging Khitan incursions.)

In late 918, Li Cunxu decided to, against Zhou's advice, launch a major attack across the Yellow River against Later Liang's capital Daliang itself. In a subsequent battle at Huliu Slope (胡柳陂, in modern Heze, Shandong), Jin forces were initially routed and suffered heavy damage (with Zhou killed in the battle), although it subsequently recovered somewhat and dealt heavy damage to Later Liang forces as well, avoiding a complete disaster. After Zhou's death, Li Cunxu transferred Zhou's title as the overseer of all Han and non-Han to Li Cunshen.

In 920, when Liu Xun was attacking Huguo, Li Cunxu sent Li Cunshen, Li Sizhao, Li Jianji (李建及), and Li Cunxian (李存賢, another adoptive son of Li Keyong's) to aid Zhu Youqian. They were successful in repelling Liu. (On this mission, Li Cunshen made an incursion into Later Liang territory as far as the Guanzhong region and offered tributes to the tombs of the Tang emperors before withdrawing.)

In 921, Wang Rong was assassinated by his adoptive son Wang Deming, who took over the Zhao realms, changed his name back to the original name of Zhang Wenli, and slaughtered the Wang clan. Li Cunxu subsequently prepared for a campaign against Zhang Wenli (who soon died and was succeeded by his son Zhang Chujin). As part of his preparation, he had Li Cunshen and Li Siyuan stationed at Desheng (德勝, in modern Puyang, Henan) and Qicheng (戚城, in modern Puyang as well) respectively and then pretended to withdraw to lure Later Liang forces under Dai. When Dai attacked, Li Cunxu himself (along with Li Siyuan and Li Cunshen) defeated him. This victory allowed Li Cunxu himself to leave the front and go to the Zhao front himself. In 922, Dai, hearing that Li Cunxu had left to siege Zhao's capital Zhen Prefecture (鎮州), launched another major attack on Desheng. Li Cunshen defended the city, and Dai was unable to capture it. Li Cunxu subsequently came to his aid, and Dai withdrew.

Zhang Chujin's mutineers turned out to be much more challenging to defeat than Li Cunxu anticipated, with several successive Jin commanders of the siege (Yan, Li Sizhao, and Li Cunjin (another adoptive son of Li Keyong's)) either defeated or killed in battle during the siege. In fall 922, Li Cunxu made Li Cunshen the overall commander of the Zhen operations. Zhang Chujin's officer Li Zaifeng (李再豐) opened the city gates and welcomed Jin forces in, allowing Li Cunshen to capture it, putting Zhang Chujin and his brothers to death. For this victory, Li Cunshen received the greater honorary chancellor title of Shizhong (侍中).

In 923, when Khitan was again attacking You Prefecture, Li Cunxu, at the suggestion of his chief of staff Guo Chongtao, despite the fact that Li Cunshen was ill at the time, made Li Cunshen the military governor of Lulong.

=== During Later Tang ===
Shortly after Li Cunshen was commissioned as the military governor of Lulong, Li Cunxu declared himself emperor, as the successor to Tang, establishing Later Tang as its Emperor Zhuangzong. He gave Li Cunshen the honorary chancellor title of Zhongshu Ling (中書令). Later in the year, he launched a surprise attack on Daliang after defeating and capturing the Later Liang general Wang Yanzhang, whose defeat left Daliang defenseless. Zhu Zhen committed suicide, ending Later Liang and allowing Later Tang to take over the rest of Later Liang territory.

Meanwhile, Li Cunshen was distressed that, despite being the most senior among Later Tang generals, he was the only main one who did not participate in the conquest of the Later Liang capital. He repeatedly requested to get a chance to pay homage to Emperor Zhuangzong again, including making the requests through his wife Lady Guo, but Guo Chongtao, who was jealous of Li Cunshen, repeatedly had the requests suppressed. Only in spring 924, when Li Cunshen was seriously ill, was the request approved, along with a new commission as the military governor of Xuanwu Circuit. Before Li Cunshen could leave Lulong, however, his illness grew worse, and he died at You Prefecture. Emperor Zhuangzong gave him posthumous honors and, per his dying request, had him buried at Taiyuan.

It was said that Li Cunshen often warned his sons not to take their high status for granted, pointing out to them that he grew up in a low social station and had to fight his way to the top, stating that arrows had to be removed from his body more than 100 times—and showing them the arrowheads, which he had preserved, as proof. Several of his sons became important generals, including Fu Yanqing, whose honored status persisted to the early Song dynasty.

== Notes and references ==
- History of the Five Dynasties, vol. 56.
- New History of the Five Dynasties, vol. 25.
- Zizhi Tongjian, vols. 259, 260, 261, 262, 264, 267, 268, 269, 270, 271, 272, 273.
