= Li Yanlu (Qi) =

Li Yanlu (李彥魯) (died 915) was a son of Li Jihui, a Tang dynasty/Qi warlord who controlled Jingnan Circuit (靜難, headquartered in modern Xianyang, Shaanxi) who briefly controlled Jingnan Circuit after he poisoned his father to death.

It is not known when Li Yanlu was born. In 914, for reasons lost to history, he poisoned his father Li Jihui to death, and then took over Jingnan, claiming the title of acting military governor. He controlled the circuit for a little over 50 days, before his adoptive brother (Li Jihui's adoptive son) Li Baoheng (李保衡) killed him and surrendered to Qi's enemy Later Liang. Qi was not able to again recapture Jingnan after that point.

== Notes and references ==
- History of the Five Dynasties, vol. 13.
- New History of the Five Dynasties, vol. 40.
- Zizhi Tongjian, vol. 269.
