= Li Maozhen =

Chinese warlord (856-924)

Li Maozhen 李茂貞
- Reign: 901 or May 12, 907 – 924
- Born: 856
- Died: May 17, 924 (Aged 67–68)
Full name
- Family name: Originally Sòng (宋), later Tian (田), then Lǐ (李) (changed ~886); Given name: Originally Wéntōng (文通), later Yànbīn (彥賓), then Màozhēn (茂貞) (changed ~886)
Posthumous name
- Zhōngjìng (忠敬) ("faithful and alert") (full)
- Dynasty: Qi

Li Maozhen (Chinese: 李茂貞; 856 – May 17, 924), born Song Wentong (宋文通), courtesy name Zhengchen (正臣), formally Prince Zhongjing of Qin (秦忠敬王), was the only ruler of the Chinese Five Dynasties and Ten Kingdoms period state Qi (901–924). He had become a powerful warlord during the reign of Emperor Zhaozong of Tang, the penultimate emperor of the preceding Tang dynasty, with his power centered on his capital Fengxiang (鳳翔, in modern Baoji, Shaanxi), and at times had effective control of Emperor Zhaozong. However, his power gradually waned due to defeats at the hands of fellow warlords Wang Jian (who would later found Former Shu) and Zhu Quanzhong (who would later found Later Liang). After Zhu usurped the Tang throne and established Later Liang, Li Maozhen refused to submit and continued to use the Tang-bestowed title of Prince of Qi as well as maintain the Tang era name, but his territory became even more reduced due to wars with Former Shu and Later Liang. After Later Liang was conquered by Later Tang, whose Emperor Zhuangzong claimed to be a legitimate successor of Tang, Li Maozhen submitted as a subject and was created the Prince of Qin in 924. He died soon thereafter, and was succeeded as by his son Li Jiyan as the military governor (Jiedushi) of Fengxiang, but as Li Jiyan was not made the Prince of Qi or Qin at that point (although he would receive both of those titles later in his life), this was typically viewed as the end of Qi as an independent state.

== Background ==
Song Wentong was born in 856, during the reign of Emperor Xuānzong of Tang. He was described as "from Boye" (博野, in modern Baoding, Hebei) — but was clearly not born there, as his family had, for generations, belonged to the Boye Army, which originally belonged to Chengde Circuit (成德, headquartered in modern Shijiazhuang, Hebei) that had its origins from Boye, but which had been stationed near the Tang imperial capital Chang'an ever since its commander Li Huan (李寰) refused to submit to Wang Tingcou, who had seized Chengde Circuit and rebelled against the imperial government, as Li Huan eventually fought his way out of attacks by Wang and took his army to the Chang'an region. Song Wentong's grandfather was named Song Duo (宋鐸); his grandmother was a Lady Zhang; his father was named Song Duan (宋端); his mother was a Lady Lu, who later received the title of Lady Dowager of Yan.

== During reign of Emperor Xizong of Tang ==
Song Wentong apparently became an officer in the Boye Army, which was then stationed at Fengtian (奉天, in modern Xianyang, Shaanxi), in his youth. When the major agrarian rebel Huang Chao captured Chang'an around the new year 881 and forced then-reigning Emperor Xizong (Emperor Xuānzong's grandson) to flee to Chengdu, the Boye Army moved to Fengxiang Circuit and followed the orders of Fengxiang's military governor (Jiedushi), the former chancellor Zheng Tian. When Huang sent his major general Shang Rang to attack Zheng, Zheng repelled Shang; in that battle, Song distinguished himself, and thereafter was made a commander in the imperial Shence Army. During his service there, he was once favored by the powerful eunuch Tian Lingzi who adopted him as his son with the name Tian Yanbin (田彥賓).

In 886, Emperor Xizong, who had returned to Chang'an after Huang's defeat, was again forced to flee Chang'an, to Xingyuan (興元, in modern Hanzhong, Shaanxi) after his trusted eunuch advisor Tian Lingzi got into a confrontation with the warlords Wang Chongrong the military governor of Huguo Circuit (護國, headquartered in modern Yuncheng, Shanxi) and Li Keyong the military governor of Hedong Circuit (河東, headquartered in modern Taiyuan, Shanxi) and was subsequently defeated by Wang Chongrong and Li Keyong. Two other warlords, Zhu Mei the military governor of Jingnan Circuit (靜難, headquartered in modern Xianyang) and Li Changfu the military governor of Fengxiang, who had previously been allied with Tian, turned against Emperor Xizong as well and supported his distant relative Li Yun the Prince of Xiang as a rival emperor at Chang'an. Zhu subsequently sent his general Wang Xingyu to advance on Xingyuan to try to capture Emperor Xizong, and Wang Xingyu initially defeated the imperial guard general Yang Sheng (楊晟). In response, Emperor Xizong sent Song, Li Chan (李鋋), and Chen Pei (陳佩) to station themselves at Mount Datang (大唐峰, in modern Hanzhong) to defend against Wang Xingyu. Wang Xingyu was unable to advance and later, after enticement by Tian's successor and the leading eunuch Yang Fugong, turned against Zhu and killed him. Li Yun fled to Wang Chongrong's territory but was killed by Wang Chongrong. For Song's accomplishments, Emperor Xizong bestowed the imperial surname of Li on him and gave him a new personal name of Maozhen ("prosperous and faithful") as well as a courtesy name of Zhengchen ("rightful subject"). In spring 887, Emperor Xizong made him the military governor of Wuding Circuit (武定, headquartered in modern Hanzhong).

In 887, when Emperor Xizong stopped at Fengxiang on his way back to Chang'an at the request of Li Changfu (who had also turned against Zhu), the imperial guards got into a confrontation with Li Changfu's troops, which turned into a full battle at Fengxiang. The imperial guards defeated Li Changfu's troops, and Li Changfu fled to Long Prefecture (隴州, in modern Baoji), which was part of Fengxiang Circuit. Emperor Xizong put Li Maozhen in command of an army attacking Long. Later in the year, under Li Maozhen's attack, Li Maozhen's subordinate Xue Zhichou (薛知籌) the prefect of Long slaughtered Li Changfu and his family and then surrendered. Subsequently, Emperor Xizong made Li Maozhen the military governor of Fengxiang and gave him the honorary chancellor title of Tong Zhongshu Menxia Pingzhangshi (同中書門下平章事).

== During reign of Emperor Zhaozong of Tang ==
=== Initial expansion of power ===
In 888, Emperor Xizong died. His younger brother Li Jie the Prince of Shou, supported by Yang Fugong, became emperor (as Emperor Zhaozong). Emperor Zhaozong bestowed a number of honors on military governors, including the greater honorary chancellor title of Shizhong (侍中) on Li Maozhen.

Despite Yang's having supported him to be emperor, Emperor Zhaozong eventually had a fallout with him. In 891, after Emperor Zhaozong suspected Yang of plotting a coup with his adoptive nephew Yang Shouxin (楊守信) and attacked his mansion, Yang fled to Shannan West Circuit (山南西道, headquartered at Xingyuan), which was then governed by his adoptive nephew Yang Shouliang. There he declared a rebellion against Emperor Zhaozong with Yang Shouliang, Yang Shouxin, and other adoptive sons and adoptive nephews including Yang Shouzhong (楊守忠) the military governor of Jinshang Circuit (金商, headquartered in modern Ankang, Shaanxi), Yang Shouzhen the military governor of Longjian Circuit (龍劍, headquartered in modern Mianyang, Sichuan), and Yang Shouhou (楊守厚) the prefect of Mian Prefecture (綿州, in modern Mianyang). In spring 892, Li Maozhen reacted by submitting a joint petition with his older brother Li Maozhuang (李茂莊) the military governor of Tianxiong Circuit (天雄, headquartered in modern Tianshui, Gansu) and allies Wang Xingyu (who had been made the military governor of Jingnan), Han Jian the military governor of Zhenguo Circuit (鎮國, headquartered in modern Weinan, Shaanxi), and Wang Xingyu's brother Wang Xingyue (王行約) the military governor of Kuangguo Circuit (匡國, headquartered in modern Weinan as well), requesting that a campaign be launched against the Yangs and that Li Maozhen be made the commander of the operations. Emperor Zhaozong, concerned that if Li Maozhen defeated the Yangs, he would be even more difficult to control, initially ordered that the sides negotiate. However, Li Maozhen and Wang Xingyu, ignoring the edict, launched the campaign, and Li Maozhen wrote disrespectful letters to the chancellor Du Rangneng and the leading eunuch Ximen Junsui (西門君遂). Emperor Zhaozong, concerned that Li Maozhen may slaughter the people of Shannan West without imperial sanction, made Li Maozhen the commander of the operations against the Yangs. Subsequently, when Emperor Zhaozong killed the imperial guard officer Li Shunjie (李順節) — who had previously been an adoptive son of Yang Fugong's but who had revealed much of Yang Fugong's secrets to Emperor Zhaozong — and Li Shunjie's ally Jia Desheng (賈德晟), Jia's troops fled to Fengxiang and joined Li Maozhen, greatly strengthening Li Maozhen's army.

In fall 892, Li Maozhen captured Feng Prefecture (鳳州, in modern Baoji), forcing Yang Fugong's follower Man Cun (滿存) the military governor of Ganyi Circuit (感義, headquartered at Feng Prefecture) to flee to Xingyuan. Li Maozhen then also captured Xing (興州) and Yang (洋州) Prefectures (both in modern Hanzhong), and had his relatives take over as prefects of those prefectures. Soon thereafter, he captured Xingyuan, forcing Yang Fugong, Yang Shouliang, Yang Shouxin, Yang Shouzhen, Yang Shouzhong, and Man to flee to Lang Prefecture (閬州, in modern Nanchong, Sichuan). He had his adoptive son Li Jimi (李繼密) take over as the acting mayor of Xingyuan. Meanwhile, seeing an opening to further expand his influence when Wang Jian the military governor of Xichuan Circuit (西川, headquartered in modern Chengdu, Sichuan) and Gu Yanhui the acting military governor of Dongchuan Circuit (東川, headquartered in modern Mianyang), who were previously allies, had a break (over Wang's apparent attempt to take over Dongchuan), Li Maozhen also recommended to Emperor Zhaozong that Gu be made full military governor; Emperor Zhaozong followed that recommendation. Thereafter, he sent Li Jimi to try to aid Gu, but after Xichuan troops defeated the joint Dongchuan/Fengxiang troops at Li Prefecture (利州, in modern Guangyuan, Sichuan), Gu sought peace with Wang under the term that he agreed to cut off relations with Li Maozhen; Wang agreed.

=== Confrontations with the imperial government ===
In spring 893, Li Maozhen submitted a petition to Emperor Zhaozong stating that he was willing to be the military governor of Shannan West — apparently believing that Emperor Zhaozong would allow him to govern both Fengxiang and Shannan West. Instead, Emperor Zhaozong, who wanted to take Fengxiang back under imperial control, issued an edict making Li Maozhen the military governor of Shannan West and Wuding Circuits while making the chancellor Xu Yanruo the military governor of Fengxiang. Apparently to placate Li Maozhen, as part of the edict, two prefectures (Lang and Guo (果州, in modern Nanchong)) were made part of Wuding. Still, Li Maozhen, disappointed at being stripped of Fengxiang, refused to comply. He further sent arrogant petitions to Emperor Zhaozong deriding him for being unable to defeat the Yangs and unable to control the warlords, and harshly-worded letters to Du Rangneng. Emperor Zhaozong, in anger, decided to prepare a campaign against Li Maozhen, disregarding Du's analysis that the imperial government had insufficient strength to defeat Li Maozhen at that time and further putting Du in charge of planning the operations. Li Maozhen, however, found out what Emperor Zhaozong was planning, as Du's fellow chancellor, Cui Zhaowei, was an ally of both Li Maozhen and Wang Xingyu and was secretly revealing the events at court to them. Li Maozhen tried to ward of Emperor Zhaozong's plans by mobilizing supporters at Chang'an to protest the campaign, but Emperor Zhaozong was not swayed.

In fall 893, Emperor Zhaozong launched his campaign, putting Li Sizhou (李嗣周) the Prince of Qin in command of a 30,000-men army to escort Xu to Fengxiang. Li Maozhen and Wang, however, gathered 60,000 well-seasoned veterans of their own to defend against the attack. Before the armies could engage each other, Li Sizhou's army, made of new soldiers with no combat experience, collapsed. Li Maozhen approached Chang'an to threaten Emperor Zhaozong, who claimed that the campaign was Ximen Junsui's idea and executed him and fellow eunuchs Li Zhoutong (李周潼) and Duan Xu (段詡). As Cui had falsely informed Li Maozhen that Du was a proponent of the campaign, Li Maozhen insisted that Du must be executed as well before he would withdraw. Emperor Zhaozong was forced to order Du to commit suicide. It was said that from this point on, Emperor Zhaozong could no longer independently govern — that both imperial officials and eunuchs were ingratiating themselves with Li Maozhen and Wang, such that they were able to force Emperor Zhaozong's actions by requesting Li Maozhen and Wang to demand Emperor Zhaozong to carry them out. Emperor Zhaozong also formally made Li Maozhen the military governor of both Fengxiang and Shannan West, as well as acting Zhongshu Ling (中書令). Li Maozhen thus controlled four circuits (Fengxiang, Shannan West, Wuding, and Tianxiong (through Li Maozhuang)), containing 15 prefectures. In spring 894, he went to Chang'an, ostensibly to pay tribute to Emperor Zhaozong, but used the chance to put on a demonstration of the grandeur of his guard troops. He stayed at Chang'an for a few days before returning to Fengxiang.

In fall 894, Li Maozhen attacked Lang Prefecture and captured it. Yang Fugong, Yang Shouliang, and Yang Shouxin were forced to flee. Eventually, in their attempt to flee to Li Keyong's Hedong Circuit, they were intercepted by Han Jian's troops and delivered to Chang'an to be executed.

In 895, Cui informed Li Maozhen and Wang Xingyu that newly commissioned chancellor Li Xi and another chancellor, Wei Zhaodu (who had earlier persuaded Emperor Zhaozong not to bestow the honorary title of Shangshu Ling (尚書令) on Wang), were planning a campaign against them. Wang and Li Maozhen thus submitted repeated petitions insisting on Li Xi's removal, and Emperor Zhaozong was forced to agree.

Later in the year, however, another flareup would occur in the relationship between the imperial government and the Li Maozhen/Wang Xingyu/Han alliance. After the recent death of Wang Chongying (Wang Chongrong's brother and successor) the military governor of Huguo Circuit, the Huguo soldiers had supported Wang Chongying's nephew Wang Ke (the son of his brother Wang Chongjian (王重簡), but who had been adopted by Wang Chongrong) as Wang Chongying's successor, but Wang Chongying's son Wang Gong the military governor of Baoyi Circuit (保義, headquartered in modern Sanmenxia, Henan), who had coveted Huguo, persuaded Wang Xingyu, Li Maozhen, and Han to submit a petition recommending that Wang Gong be given Huguo and Wang Ke be given Baoyi. Emperor Zhaozong, citing Li Keyong's support for Wang Ke's succession (as Wang Ke was his son-in-law), refused. Thereafter, Li Maozhen, Wang Xingyu, and Han marched on the capital and put, against Emperor Zhaozong's orders, Li Xi and Wei to death. They then considered deposing Emperor Zhaozong and replacing him with his brother Li Bao (李保) the Prince of Ji. However, at this point, they heard that Li Keyong had mobilized his army and was preparing to march against them, so they, after leaving 2,000 soldiers each at Chang'an to watch over the emperor, returned to their circuits to prepare to defend against Li Keyong.

=== Confrontation with Li Keyong and recovery therefrom ===
Meanwhile, Li Keyong launched his army and issued a harshly-worded declaration against Li Maozhen, Wang Xingyu, and Han Jian, accusing them of wrongly killing Wei Zhaodu and Li Xi. He quickly defeated and killed Wang Gong's brother Wang Yao (王瑤) the prefect of Jiang Prefecture (絳州, in modern Yuncheng), who was allied with Wang Gong in the Wang Gong/Wang Ke dispute. He then crossed the Yellow River and attacked Kuangguo; Wang Xingyue abandoned the circuit and fled to Chang'an. He then put Han's capital Hua Prefecture (華州) under siege.

Meanwhile, the armies that Li Maozhen and Wang Xingyu left at Chang'an got into a fight between themselves, as both Li Maozhen's adoptive son Li Jipeng (李繼鵬), who commanded the Fengxiang soldiers, and Wang Xingyue and another brother, Wang Xingshi (王行實), who commanded the Jingnan soldiers, wanted to seize the emperor and take him to their circuit. Emperor Zhaozong, as the two armies were engaging themselves, fled into the Qin Mountains to avoid being captured. Meanwhile, Li Keyong, hearing that the two circuits were fighting to control the emperor, quickly advanced on Chang'an and forced the two circuits' soldiers to flee back to their own circuits.

Li Keyong then advanced to Jingnan's Liyuan Camp (黎園寨, in modern Xianyang). Hearing of Li Keyong's victory there, Li Maozhen, fearful, executed Li Jipeng and presented his head to Emperor Zhaozong to beg for forgiveness, and also wrote Li Keyong to seek peace. Emperor Zhaozong thus ordered Li Keyong to concentrate on attacking Wang Xingyu. Emperor Zhaozong then declared a general campaign against Wang Xingyu and stripped him of all of his titles. Li Maozhen, despite sending the emissaries to the emperor and Li Keyong, sent troops to aid Wang. Li Keyong thus asked Emperor Zhaozong to extend the campaign to Li Maozhen as well. Emperor Zhaozong disagreed, but issued an edict ordering Li Maozhen to withdraw. By winter 895, Wang Xingyu abandoned his capital Bin Prefecture and fled; he was killed in flight by his own officers; his head was delivered to Chang'an and presented to Emperor Zhaozong. At Li Keyong's recommendations, Emperor Zhaozong commissioned the imperial guard general Su Wenjian (蘇文建) to be the new military governor of Jingnan.

Li Keyong then secretly suggested to Emperor Zhaozong that a campaign be launched against Li Maozhen, warning the emperor that without Li Maozhen's destruction, the imperial government would not be safe. However, Emperor Zhaozong and the imperial officials were concerned that Li Maozhen's destruction would destroy a power balance and made it impossible to control Li Keyong. Therefore, while Emperor Zhaozong bestowed a number of honors on Li Keyong and his subordinates, including the title of Prince of Jin on Li Keyong, he denied Li Keyong permission to attack Li Maozhen. Li Keyong subsequently withdrew from the Guanzhong region (i.e., Chang'an's environs) and returned to Hedong. It was said that while Li Keyong was in the region, Li Maozhen and Han were respectful to the emperor in their words, but that as soon as Li Keyong withdrew, they returned to arrogance. Li Maozhen also captured some territory in the Hexi Corridor region and made his subordinate Hu Jingzhang (胡敬璋) the military governor of Hexi Circuit.

In 896, Li Maozhen, apprehensive that Emperor Zhaozong was rebuilding the imperial guards and putting the imperial princes in command of them, submitted a number of petitions against doing so, to no avail. Li Maozhen thus launched his army and approached the capital, defeating the army that Emperor Zhaozong sent under Li Sizhou's command to defend against the attack. Emperor Zhaozong thus fled the capital with the imperial princes and officials, initially planning to flee to Hedong, and he sent Li Jiepi (李戒丕) the Prince of Yan to arrange the affairs with Li Keyong. However, as Hedong was far from Chang'an, and Han was then inviting Emperor Zhaozong to head to Hua Prefecture, Emperor Zhaozong decided to accept the invitation and head for Hua Prefecture instead, making it the location of his temporary palace. Li Maozhen entered Chang'an and burned the palace and other office buildings, although he subsequently submitted an apologetic petition and offered to repair the palaces and the offices.

While at Hua Prefecture, Emperor Zhaozong considered a counterattack against Li Maozhen. However, as Han gained great influence over the affairs of the court by virtue of his own army's presence at Hua and had long been an ally of Li Maozhen's, he dissuaded Emperor Zhaozong from launching such a campaign. Meanwhile, Wang Jian resumed his attacks on Dongchuan, and when Li Maozhen sent his adoptive son Li Jihui to assist Gu Yanhui, Li Jihui was repelled by Wang Jian's adoptive son Wang Zongjin (王宗謹). In 897, Li Maozhen's adoptive son Li Jitang (李繼瑭) was made the military governor of Kuangguo, allowing Li Maozhen's further expansion toward the east.

Later in the year, Emperor Zhaozong made another attempt to take back Fengxiang. Li Maozhen had submitted a petition accusing Wang Jian of attacking Dongchuan against imperial orders. Emperor Zhaozong reacted by issuing an edict demoting Wang to be the prefect of Nan Prefecture (南州, in modern Chongqing), making Li Maozhen the military governor of Xichuan to replace Wang, and making Li Sizhou the military governor of Fengxiang to replace Li Maozhen. Both Wang and Li Maozhen refused to follow the edict, and Li Maozhen further refused to let Li Sizhou to reach Fengxiang by putting Li Sizhou under siege at Fengtian. Only after Han wrote Li Maozhen did Li Maozhen lift the siege on Fengtian to allow Li Sizhou to return to Hua. (Li Sizhou — and 10 other princes — however, did not escape death. Soon after Li Sizhou's return to Hua, Li Jiepi returned from Hedong, thus exposing the fact that Li Keyong was in no shape to aid the emperor. With that possibility gone, Han slaughtered the imperial princes, including Li Sizhou, Li Jiepi, and Emperor Zhaozong's uncle Li Zi the Prince of Tong, and then claimed to Emperor Zhaozong that they were plotting treason.) Emperor Zhaozong did make Zhang Lian (張璉) the military governor of Zhangyi Circuit (彰義, headquartered in modern Pingliang, Gansu) the commander of the operations against Li Maozhen, but it appeared that Zhang was either unable or unwilling to attack Li Maozhen, for there was no further record of what Zhang did in the campaign. Emperor Zhaozong also stripped Li Maozhen of his titles and his imperially-bestowed name of Li Maozhen, referring to him as Song Wentong again. (After Emperor Zhaozong's declaration of the campaign against Li Maozhen, Li Jitang abandoned Kuangguo and fled back to Fengxiang; Han thereafter took over Kuangguo as well.)

=== Temporary rapprochement with the imperial government ===
Meanwhile, though, at this point, with Wang Jian continuing to pressure Gu Yanhui and Li Maozhen's being unable to face Wang on one side and the imperial government on the other, and with Zhu Quanzhong the military governor of Xuanwu Circuit (宣武, headquartered in modern Kaifeng, Henan) repairing the palace at Luoyang and repeatedly requesting Emperor Zhaozong to move the capital there, he and Han Jian decided to have their soldiers jointly repair the palace and the imperial offices at Chang'an to beg Emperor Zhaozong for forgiveness. Emperor Zhaozong, in response, issued an edict ending the campaign against Li Maozhen in spring 898 and restoring his imperially-bestowed name of Li Maozhen and his title as military governor of Fengxiang, and later in the year making him additionally the military governor of Zhangyi. Emperor Zhaozong subsequently returned to Chang'an.

In 900, there was an incident where Emperor Zhaozong, after becoming drunk, personally killed a few eunuchs and ladies in waiting. The eunuch commanders of the imperial Shence Army, Liu Jishu and Wang Zhongxian (王仲先), as well as the eunuch directors of palace communications Wang Yanfan (王彥範) and Xue Qiwo (薛齊偓), jointly deposed him and declared his son Li Yu, Prince of De the Crown Prince the new emperor. However, in 901, the Shence Army officers Sun Dezhao (孫德昭), Zhou Chenghui (周承誨), and Dong Yanbi (董彥弼) carried out a countercoup, killing the four top eunuchs and restoring Emperor Zhaozong to the throne. After this incident, Li Maozhen went to Chang'an to pay homage to Emperor Zhaozong. Emperor Zhaozong thereafter bestowed the titles of acting Shangshu Ling and Shizhong on him, and also created him the Prince of Qi. At the request of the chancellor Cui Yin, who was fearful that surviving eunuchs would make a comeback, Li Maozhen left 3,000 Fengxiang soldiers at Chang'an to counteract the Shence Army, which remained under the command of eunuchs Han Quanhui and Zhang Yanhong (張彥弘) (who was formerly the eunuch monitor of the Fengxiang army). Meanwhile, when Zhu attacked Huguo Circuit around the same time, and Wang Ke sought aid from both Li Keyong and Li Maozhen, Li Keyong was unable to save him because his path was cut off by another army of Zhu's, and Li Maozhen did not act at all. Zhu was able to force Wang Ke to surrender, adding Huguo to the territory he controlled.

Meanwhile, to reduce the financial independence of the Shence Army, Cui issued an order that the Shence Army, along with the nearby circuits, no longer be given monopolies on the sale of yeast. Li Maozhen, however, was unwilling to give up the yeast monopoly, and requested to go to Chang'an to explain his reasons to Emperor Zhaozong. At Han Quanhui's request, Emperor Zhaozong permitted him to do so. When Li Maozhen got to Chang'an, Han entered into an alliance with him. Cui, realizing this, began to see Li Maozhen as an enemy and began to ally with Zhu, particularly since Li Maozhen was also displeased at Cui's attempt to have the chancellors take over the Shence Army under the argument that doing so would curb the warlords' power.

By fall 901, the situation had become tense at Chang'an, as Cui and Emperor Zhaozong had been planning a general slaughter of the eunuchs, but Han and Zhang had become aware of the plan, and thereafter had the soldiers surround the palace and claim that Cui was unduly reducing the clothing stipends of the Shence Army. Emperor Zhaozong, while not removing Cui from his chancellor position, removed him from his secondary post as the director of the salt and iron monopolies. This incident, however, made Cui aware that the eunuchs knew what it was up to, and he thus sent a secret letter to Zhu requesting him to come with an army to Chang'an to slaughter the eunuchs. When Han and Zhang became aware that Zhu was coming to Chang'an, they forcibly seized Emperor Zhaozong and took him to Fengxiang.

=== Confrontation with Zhu Quanzhong and recovery therefrom ===
Zhu Quanzhong quickly arrived at Chang'an, took the imperial officials who remained there under his protection, and then headed for Fengxiang. Li Maozhen had Emperor Zhaozong issue an edict ordering Zhu to return to Xuanwu; Zhu initially reacted by leaving Fengxiang, but then instead headed north to attack Jingnan (which was then governed by Li Jihui). Li Jihui surrendered to Zhu, changed his name back to his birth name of Yang Chongben, and was allowed to remain at Jingnan. Yang sent his wife as a hostage to Zhu.

Meanwhile, Li Maozhen and Han Quanhui sent out various calls for help in Emperor Zhaozong's name. A number of eunuchs that Han sent to southeastern circuits were intercepted and executed by Zhu's ally Feng Xingxi the military governor of Rongzhao Circuit (戎昭, i.e., Jinshang). Wang Jian, meanwhile, tried to play both sides, as he publicly denounced Li Maozhen and offered assistance to Zhu, while secretly sending messengers to Fengxiang to encourage Li Maozhen to hold out — yet sent his adoptive sons Wang Zongji (王宗佶) and Wang Zongdi (i.e., Hua Hong, whom Wang had adopted as a son by that point) toward Fengxiang, claiming to want to welcome the emperor to his realm, but instead was intending to capture Shannan West from Li Maozhen. Li Keyong did have his nephew Li Sizhao and officer Zhou Dewei launch an attack on Huguo, to try to divert Zhu's attention, but Zhu reacted by having his officer Shi Shucong (氏叔琮) and nephew Zhu Youning (朱友寧) make a major counterattack that reached all the way to Li Keyong's capital Taiyuan Municipality and had it under siege, with the situation being so desperate that Li Keyong even considered abandoning Taiyuan and fleeing; eventually, Taiyuan's defenses held, but the damage to Li Keyong's army was so severe that it was said for several years Li Keyong did not dare to seriously consider engaging Zhu again.

Zhu subsequently approached Fengxiang again. In summer 902, Li Maozhen tried to take back the initiative by gathering his own troops and exiting the city, to engage Zhu at Guo County (虢縣, in modern Baoji), but was defeated at the loss of thousands of his men. Zhu, after having his officer Kong Qing (孔勍) capture Feng Prefecture, arrived at Fengxiang. He built five camps and had Fengxiang surrounded. Li Maozhen's cousin Li Maoxun (李茂勳), who was then the military governor of Baoda Circuit (保大, headquartered in modern Yan'an, Shaanxi) tried to aid Fengxiang, but was defeated by Kong and another Xuanwu officer, Kang Huaizhen (康懷貞), and forced to withdraw. Meanwhile, Li Jimi, under attack by Xichuan forces, was forced to surrender to Wang Jian, and Shannan West and Wuding (which surrendered soon thereafter) became Wang's territory.

In fall 902, Zhu, with his army troubled by rains and illnesses, considered withdrawing, but was dissuaded by his officers Liu Zhijun and Gao Jichang. Gao further suggested that a decisive victory against Li Maozhen could be had by laying a trap for Li Maozhen. Zhu had his camps go quiet, and then had the soldier Ma Jing (馬景) falsely surrender to Fengxiang forces and claim that the Xuanwu forces were so stricken by illness that they had secretly withdrawn. Li Maozhen, believing Ma's false information, exited the city to try to chase after Zhu to attack him — and fell into the trap that Zhu had set with his hidden armies. The Fengxiang forces suffered great losses. It was said that it was after this point that Li Maozhen became fearful and began to consider surrendering the emperor to Zhu.

By winter 902, Fengxiang had nearly completely exhausted its food supplies, such that the people resorted to cannibalism. Li Maozhen's further attempts to fight out of the siege were repelled. Further, when Li Maoxun made another attempt to aid Fengxiang, Zhu counterattacked and captured Baoda, forcing Li Maoxun to surrender. With his northern territories lost to Zhu and southern territories lost to Wang Jian, Li Maozhen saw no other alternative but to negotiate with Zhu, and he began secret negotiations. In spring 903, Li Maozhen secretly met with Emperor Zhaozong alone (i.e., without eunuchs in attendance) and proposed to slaughter Han and the other leading eunuchs to seek peace with Zhu. Li Maozhen subsequently carried out the slaughter and delivered the heads to Zhu. After negotiating marriages between his son Li Jikan (李繼侃) and Emperor Zhaozong's daughter Princess Pingyuan and between Emperor Zhaozong's son Li Mi (李秘) the Prince of Jing and the daughter of the chancellor Su Jian (an ally of Li Maozhen's), Li Maozhen opened the city gates and surrendered the emperor to Zhu, who escorted the emperor back to Chang'an. (Thereafter, Zhu and Cui Yin carried out a general slaughter of all eunuchs.) Thereafter, Emperor Zhaozong had Zhu send a letter to Li Maozhen demanding the return of Princess Pingyuan; Li Maozhen did not dare another confrontation, and returned her to Emperor Zhaozong. Li Maozhen also offered to be relieved of the title of Shangshu Ling, and was again made Zhongshu Ling.

In spring 904, Zhu, suspecting Cui of planning to reorganize the imperial guards in order to oppose him, killed Cui. Hearing this news, Yang Chongben, who had been angry that Zhu had raped his wife during the time that his wife was a hostage of Zhu's, resubmitted to Li Maozhen and changed his name back to Li Jihui. Their joint forces, claiming that Zhu was about to usurp the Tang throne, then headed toward Chang'an. Zhu, believing that his own hold on Chang'an was tenuous, reacted by destroying the palace and most buildings in Chang'an, and forcing Emperor Zhaozong and the people of Chang'an to relocate east, making Luoyang the new capital. Meanwhile, Wang joined Li Maozhen's call for return of the emperor to Chang'an and entered into a peace agreement with Li Maozhen, and Wang gave a daughter in marriage to Li Maozhen's nephew Li Jichong (李繼崇) the military governor of Tianxiong Circuit to cement the alliance.

By this point, Zhu had concluded that Emperor Zhaozong was a liability to him — as the warlords opposing him all made the public announcement that the emperor should be rescued and returned to Chang'an, and he was fearful that the emperor might secretly coordinate his actions with theirs to oppose Zhu. Believing that a new and younger emperor would be easier to control, in summer 904, Zhu had Shi and his adoptive son Zhu Yougong (朱友恭) assassinate Emperor Zhaozong, and then, blaming the assassination on them, forced them to commit suicide. He had Emperor Zhaozong's son Li Zuo the Prince of Hui declared emperor (as Emperor Ai).

== During reign of Emperor Ai of Tang ==
In 906, Li Maozhen sent Li Jikan to Xichuan as a hostage. Wang Jian made Li Jikan the prefect of Peng Prefecture (彭州, in modern Chengdu).

In 907, Zhu Quanzhong had Emperor Ai yield the throne to him, ending Tang and founding a new Later Liang (as its Emperor Taizu). Li Maozhen, Li Keyong, Yang Wo the military governor of Huainan Circuit (淮南, headquartered in modern Yangzhou, Jiangsu) the Prince of Hongnong, and Wang Jian refused to acknowledge the Later Liang emperor, but after Wang judged it impossible for Tang to be rebuilt, he declared himself the emperor of a new state of Former Shu.

== As independent Prince of Qi ==
=== Initial confrontations with Later Liang and subsequent loss of northern territories ===
Li Maozhen, knowing that his state of Qi was weak, did not dare to declare himself emperor. Nevertheless, he took on many trappings of an emperor, including establishing an Office of the Prince of Qi that had a large number of officials bearing titles akin to imperial officials, referring to his residence as "palace," and having his wife referred to as "empress." It was said that he continued to have the support of his soldiers by being lenient and open with them, but as a result his army lacked military discipline. Indeed, it was said that his army was so weakened by this point that, in 908, when Li Keyong's son and successor Li Cunxu the Prince of Jin tried to lift the siege that Later Liang forces were laying on Li Sizhao at Zhaoyi Circuit (昭義, headquartered in modern Changzhi, Shanxi), Li Maozhen was not able to send any aid at all. (Li Cunxu was subsequently able to defeat Later Liang forces and lift the siege without Qi aid.)

Later in 908, Qi and Former Shu forces jointly tried to capture Chang'an, and Jin also sent an army commanded by the eunuch general Zhang Chengye. However, after Qi forces were defeated by Liu Zhijun at Mu Valley (幕谷, in modern Xianyang), all three states withdrew. Later in the year, Qi's military governor of Baosai Circuit (保塞, headquartered in modern Yan'an), Hu Jingzhang (胡敬璋), tried to attack Later Liang's Shangping Pass (上平關, in modern Lüliang, Shanxi), but was repelled by Liu as well.

Meanwhile, with Yang Wo having been assassinated by his officers Zhang Hao and Xu Wen in 908 and replaced by his brother Yang Longyan, Yang Longyan sent the officer Wan Quangan (萬全感) to Jin and Qi to inform them of the succession. Li Maozhen, thereafter, acting as the representative of the Tang emperor, bestowed on Yang Longyan the titles of Zhongshu Ling and Prince of Wu (a title previously held by Yang Wo's and Yang Longyan's father Yang Xingmi).

After Hu's death in late 908, Li Jihui initially commissioned Hu's officer Liu Wanzi (劉萬子) the new military governor of Baosai. However, hearing that Liu Wanzi was plotting to surrender to Later Liang, he had his officer Li Yantu (李延圖) attack Liu Wanzi and take over Baosai. Soon thereafter, the Baosai officer Gao Wanxing (高萬興) and the Qi military governor of Baoda, Li Yanbo (李彥博), both surrendered to Later Liang, and it appeared that Later Liang took over both Baosai and Baoda.

Through these years, Later Liang's Emperor Taizu had been reliant on Liu Zhijun, who was then the military governor of Zhongwu Circuit (忠武, i.e., formerly Kuangguo), to defend against these Qi and Jin incursions; he had thus bestowed many honors on Liu. Nevertheless, Liu had become apprehensive of the increasing volatility in Emperor Taizu's temper, particularly after, in summer 909, after the false report by Liu Han (劉捍) the military governor of Youguo Circuit (佑國, headquartered at Chang'an) that the former military governor of Youguo, Wang Chongshi (王重師), was in secret communications with Qi, Emperor Taizu ordered Wang to commit suicide and slaughtered Wang's family. When Emperor Taizu subsequently summoned Liu Zhijun so that he could discuss a campaign against Jin with Liu Zhijun, Liu Zhijun became convinced that he would be executed. He therefore surrendered to Qi and made a surprise attack on Chang'an, capturing it and delivering Liu Han to Fengxiang to be executed. Liu Zhijun's subsequent optimistic goal of joining Qi and Jin forces to attack Luoyang, however, was dashed when the Later Liang general Liu Xun quickly arrived at Chang'an and recaptured it from the Qi forces that had taken up defensive positions there. Liu Zhijun was forced to flee to Fengxiang, with his own territory falling back into Later Liang control. Li Maozhen honored Liu Zhijun greatly, but as Qi territories were greatly reduced already, he felt he had no territory to allow Liu Zhijun to govern, and therefore only gave Liu Zhijun the title of Zhongshu Ling and awarded him money.

In winter 908, Li Maozhen sent Liu Zhijun to attack Later Liang's Shuofang Circuit (朔方, headquartered in modern Yinchuan, Ningxia), with the intention of using it to accommodate Liu and to serve as the supplier of horses and other livestock for the Qi army. When Han Xun (韓遜) the military governor of Shuofang sought aid from Later Liang, Emperor Taizu sent Kang Huaizhen to attack Jingnan in order to force Liu to stop the attack. Kang quickly captured three of Jingnan's prefectures, but when Liu returned, he fell into a trap laid by Liu and suffered great losses. After the battle, despite the limited territory he held, Li Maozhen made Liu the military governor of Zhangyi.

In 910, Li Maozhen (with Liu and Li Jihui) all sent forces, joined by Jin forces, to attack Li Renfu the military governor of Later Liang's Dingnan Circuit (定難, headquartered in modern Yulin, Shaanxi). After Emperor Taizu sent the officers Li Yu (李遇) and Liu Wan (劉綰) to aid Li Renfu, however, the Qi and Jin forces withdrew.

=== Confrontation with Former Shu and loss of Jingnan and Tianxiong Circuits ===
In 911, Wang Jian's daughter, who had married Li Jichong and who had been bestowed the title of Princess Puci, sent messengers to Wang, accusing Li Jichong of being arrogant and drunk. Wang thereafter sent a summons to Princess Puci, ostensibly asking her to come home just for a visit. After she arrived in Chengdu, however, Wang kept her at Chengdu and did not send her back to Li Jichong. Li Maozhen, in anger, ended his alliance with Former Shu.

Li Maozhen thereafter gathered his troops, posturing a potential attack against Former Shu. Wang Jian reacted by gathering 120,000 men and putting them under the commands of his adoptive sons Wang Zongyou (王宗祐) and Wang Zonghe (王宗賀) and Tang Daoxi the military governor of Shannan Circuit (i.e., formerly Shannan West), to attack Qi. The Former Shu forces quickly achieved several victories over Qi forces. However, a counterattack by Liu Zhijun and Li Jichong subsequently defeated Former Shu forces; they then approached Xingyuan. The Former Shu forces, in panic, considered abandoning Xingyuan, but Tang refused to do so. Subsequent counterattacks by Former Shu forces repelled the Qi attack, forcing Qi forces to withdraw. Thereafter, due to the false accusations of Li Maozhen's attendant Shi Jianyong (石簡顒), Li Maozhen stripped Liu of his command for some time, but subsequently at Li Jichong's urging, Li Maozhen executed Shi to comfort Liu. Thereafter, at Li Jichong's invitation, Liu relocated his family to Tianxiong's capital Qin Prefecture (秦州). Over the next few years, continued battles were waged between Former Shu and Qi, with Former Shu repeatedly having success and gradually gaining Qi territory.

In 914, Li Jihui was poisoned to death by his son Li Yanlu, who claimed the title of acting military governor. Subsequently, in 915, Li Jihui's adoptive son Li Baoheng (李保衡) killed Li Yanlu and surrendered Jingnan Circuit to Later Liang. Later Liang's emperor Zhu Zhen (Emperor Taizu's son and successor) thereafter transferred Li Baoheng away and made his general Huo Yanwei the new military governor of Jingnan; Qi was unable to regain Jingnan thereafter, as an attempt by Liu to recapture it initially resulted in a stalemate. Subsequently, when the Former Shu general Wang Zonghan (王宗翰) attacked Qin Prefecture, Li Jichong surrendered; Liu, hearing that Tianxiong had fallen, and that his family had been taken to Chengdu, lifted the siege on Bin Prefecture and fled to Former Shu. Meanwhile, Qi's military governor of Yisheng Circuit (義勝, headquartered in modern Tongchuan, Shaanxi), Li Yantao, seeing Qi's weakened state, also surrendered to Later Liang; Zhu Zhen had him restored to his birth family name of Wen and gave him a new name of Zhaotu.

In fall 916, Wang Jian launched another major attack on Fengxiang, this time putting Fengxiang under siege. The Qi forces defended the city and refused to engage Former Shu forces. When a snowstorm hampered the Former Shu attack, Former Shu forces withdrew, but by this point, in effect, Qi's territory was limited to Fengxiang Municipality and its immediate surroundings.

In 918, Li Maozhen sent emissaries to again seek peace with Former Shu. It is not clear how Wang Jian received the peace proposal. However, after Wang Jian's death later that year, his son and successor Wang Zongyan launched another attack on Fengxiang in spring 919. When the Former Shu army ran into rainstorms, however, it withdrew.

In 920, Former Shu launched another attack on Qi and initially achieved victories. However, when the Former Shu army's food supplies ran out, it withdrew.

== Submission to Later Tang ==
In 923, Li Cunxu, who by that point had claimed to be the legitimate successor to Tang and declared a new Later Tang as its Emperor Zhuangzong, finally achieved total victory against Later Liang, capturing its capital Daliang; Zhu Zhen committed suicide before Later Tang forces could capture him, ending Later Liang. Upon hearing the news, Li Maozhen sent emissaries to congratulate Emperor Zhuangzong, but in the letter used an arrogant tone, considering himself an uncle. (That was because when both Li Maozhen and Li Keyong were granted the Tang imperial clan name of Li, they were both adopted into Tang imperial prince heritages in the same generation, and therefore were technically cousins.) However, after Emperor Zhuangzong subsequently entered Luoyang and made it his capital, Li Maozhen became apprehensive that he might become the Later Tang emperor's next target. In spring 924, he thus sent his son Li Jiyan to submit tributes to Emperor Zhuangzong and to submit a petition in which he referred to himself as a Later Tang subject. Emperor Zhuangzong received Li Jiyan warmly and granted the title of Zhongshu Ling on him, while he honored Li Maozhen by referring him only by his formal title of Prince of Qi, not by his name, in edicts. After Li Jiyan returned to Fengxiang, he relayed to Li Maozhen what he saw — that the Later Tang army was great in its strength. Li Maozhen, in fear, submitted another petition in which he requested that he be allowed to be a simple subject — in other words, that Emperor Zhuangzong no longer omit his name in edicts. Emperor Zhuangzong declined. He subsequently created Li Maozhen the Prince of Qin, still not referring to him by name and still not requiring him to bow to the imperial emissaries sent to declare this new creation.

Later in the year, Li Maozhen died. In his final petition to Emperor Zhuangzong, he requested that Li Jiyan be allowed to retain Fengxiang. Emperor Zhuangzong subsequently confirmed Li Jiyan as the military governor of Fengxiang.

== Personal information ==
- Father
  - Song Duan (宋端)
- Mother
  - Lady Lu, Lady Dowager of Yan
- Wife
  - Empress Liu, mother of Li Jiyan, Li Jichang, Li Jizhao, Li Jiwei, and three daughters, later known as Lady Dowager Xiande of Qin
- Children
  - Li Jiyan (李繼曮), name later changed to Li Congyan (李從曮) (changed 926)
  - Li Jichang (李繼昶), name later changed to Li Congchang (李從昶) (changed 926)
  - Li Jizhao (李繼昭), name later changed to Li Congzhao (李從昭) (apparently different than adoptive son Fu Daozhao) (changed 926)
  - Li Jiwei (李繼暐)
  - Li Jikan (李繼侃) or Li Kan (李侃), name briefly changed to Song Kan (宋侃) in 902
  - One other son
  - Four daughters
- Adoptive children
  - Li Jizhen (李繼臻)
  - Li Jimi (李繼密), né Wang Wanhong (王萬弘), surrendered to Wang Jian 902 and changed name back to Wang Wanhong, later committed suicide
  - Li Jipeng (李繼鵬), né Yan Gui (閻珪), executed by Li Maozhen 895
  - Li Jiyóng (李繼顒, note different tone than his adoptive brother), killed by Wang Zongkan (王宗侃) 895
  - Li Jiyōng (李繼雍, note different tone than his adoptive brother)
  - Li Jihui (李繼徽), né Yang Chongben (楊崇本), surrendered to Zhu Quanzhong 901 and changed name back to Yang Chongben, changed name back to Li Jihui and resubmitted to Li Maozhen 904, poisoned to death in 914 by his son Li Yanlu
  - Li Jizhao (李繼昭), né Fu Daozhao (符道昭) (apparently different than biological son Li Congzhao), surrendered to Zhu Quanzhong 902
  - Li Jitang (李繼瑭)
  - Li Jining (李繼寧), captured by Wang Jian 897
  - Li Jipo (李繼溥), surrendered to Wang Jian 897
  - Li Jiyun (李繼筠), executed by Li Maozhen 903
  - Li Jizhong (李繼忠)
  - Li Jiliao (李繼鐐), captured by Zhu Quanzhong 902
  - Li Jiqin (李繼欽)
  - Li Jizhi (李繼直), killed by Han Xun (韓遜) 909
  - Li Jikui (李繼虁)
  - Li Jiji (李繼岌), né Sang Hongzhi (桑弘志), surrendered to Wang Jian 916 and changed name back to Sang Hongzhi
  - Li Jizhi (李繼陟)

== Notes and references ==
- History of the Five Dynasties, vol. 132.
- New History of the Five Dynasties, vol. 40.
- Zizhi Tongjian, vols. 256, 257, 258, 259, 260, 261, 262, 263, 264, 265, 266, 267, 268, 269, 270, 271, 272, 273.

Chinese nobility
New creation	Prince of Qi/Qin; 901–924	Submitted to Later Tang
Preceded by Emperor Ai of Tang	Ruler of China (Western Shaanxi) (de jure); 907–924	Succeeded by Li Cunxu of Later Tang
Preceded by Li Changfu	Ruler of China (Baoji region) (de facto); 887–924	Succeeded by Li Jiyan
