= Qi (Li Maozhen's state) =

10th-century Chinese kingdom

Qi 岐
- 907–924
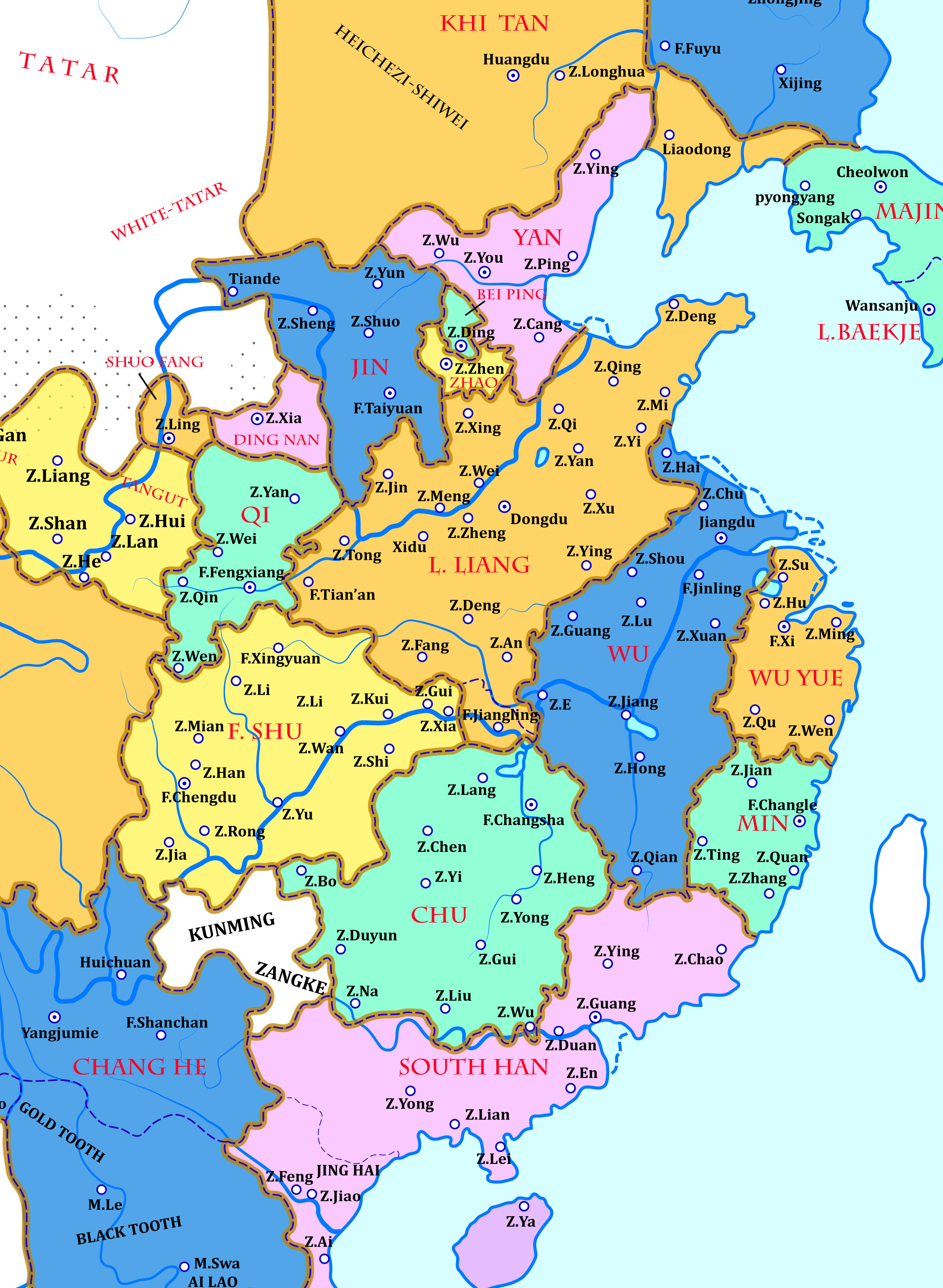
- Capital: Fengxiang
- Government: Principality
- Prince
  - 901/907–924: Li Maozhen
- Historical era: Five Dynasties and Ten Kingdoms Period
  - Li Maozhen created the Prince of Qi: 901
  - Established: 907
  - Disestablished: 924
  - Li Jiyan's removal as military governor of Fengxiang: 926
- Today part of: China

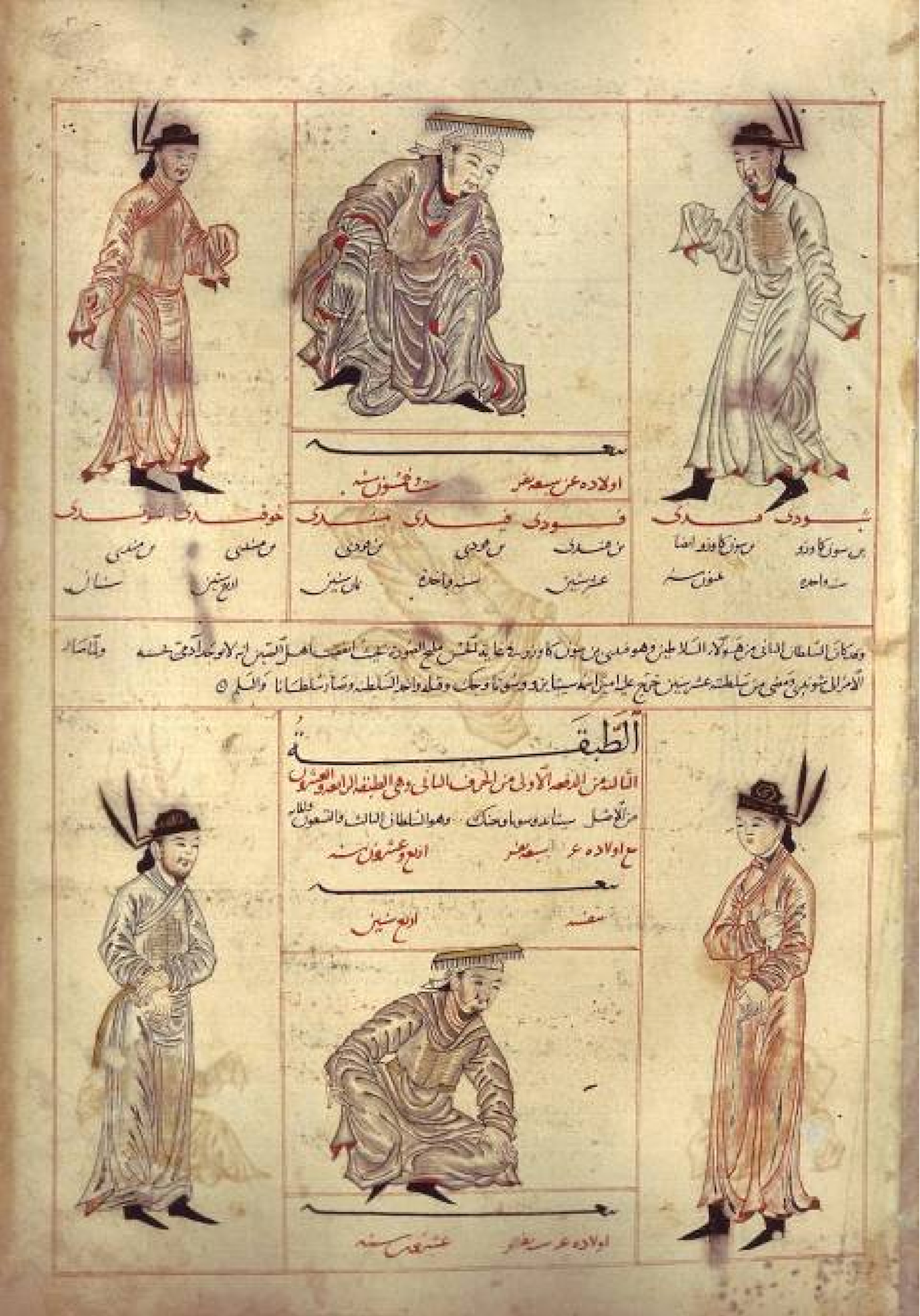
Two Emperors of the Qi and Liang Dynasties, in Jami al-Tawarikh (Compendium of Chronicles), by Rashid al-Din, Iran, 1306 CE

Qi (Chinese: 岐) was a principality during the Five Dynasties and Ten Kingdoms period in Chinese history. The principality, at its prime, covered parts of modern-day Gansu, Shaanxi, and Sichuan provinces, but eventually shrank to only the immediate area around its capital Fengxiang in Shaanxi. Its only ruler was Li Maozhen, who later submitted to Later Tang. (After Li Maozhen's death in 924, his son Li Congyan would continue to govern Fengxiang until 926, when he was removed by the Later Tang's emperor Li Cunxu, although he would serve three later stints as governor of Fengxiang.)

== See also ==
- Gifu which starts with the same character
