= Liu Chongwang =

Liu Chongwang (劉崇望; c. 839? – July 30, 900?), courtesy name Xitu (希徒), formally the Baron of Pengcheng (彭城男), was an official of the Chinese Tang dynasty, serving as a chancellor during the reign of Emperor Zhaozong.

== Background ==
Liu Chongwang was probably born around 839, during the reign of Emperor Wenzong. His ancestors claimed ancestry from the Cao Wei-era Xiongnu prince Qubei, and his traceable ancestors included officials of Northern Qi, Sui dynasty, and Tang dynasties, including the early Tang general Liu Zhenghui (劉政會). Both his grandfather Liu Zao (劉藻) and father Liu Fu (劉符) were Tang officials as well, but neither was particularly prominent—with Liu Zao serving as Mishu Lang (秘書郎), an administrator at the Palace Library, and Liu Fu serving as a prefectural prefect. (According to a later statement by another chancellor, Li Xi, Liu Fu committed suicide after being investigated for bribery.) Liu Chongwang was the third of eight brothers; both of his older brothers Liu Chonggui (劉崇龜) and Liu Chongyi (劉崇彝), as well as three younger brothers, Liu Chonglu (劉崇魯), Liu Chongmo (劉崇謨), and Liu Guī (劉珪), would serve as Tang officials as well; his other younger brothers were Liu Guì (劉瓌, note different tone) and Liu Yu (劉玗). Liu Chongwang passed the imperial examinations in the Jinshi class in 875, during the reign of Emperor Wenzong's cousin Emperor Yizong.

== During Emperor Xizong's reign ==
During the reign of Emperor Yizong's son Emperor Xizong, when the imperial official Wang Ning (王凝) became the governor (觀察使, Guanchashi) of Xuanshe Circuit (宣歙, headquartered in modern Xuancheng, Anhui), Liu Chongwang served on his staff as the surveyor of food supply missions to the capital Chang'an. Later, when the imperial official Cui Anqian served as the military governor (Jiedushi) of Zhongwu Circuit (忠武, headquartered in modern Xuchang, Henan) and then of Xichuan Circuit (西川, headquartered in modern Chengdu, Sichuan), he invited Liu and three of his brothers to serve on staff, and all four became known for being talented. Later, apparently after Cui was recalled to Chang'an, Liu followed him to Chang'an and served as sheriff of Chang'an County (one of the two counties making up the city) and was later made a scholar at Hongwen Pavilion (弘文館). When Cui served as the minister of civil service affairs, Liu served under him with the low-level titles of Sixun Yuanwailang (司勛員外郎) and then Libu Yuanwailang (吏部員外郎), but was said to be instrumental in reforming the state of the ministry of civil service affairs at that time.

Liu's activities during the next few years—which included tumultuous events including the major agrarian rebel Huang Chao's capture of Chang'an and Emperor Xizong's flight to Xichuan and subsequent return to Chang'an after Huang's defeat—were not clear. As of 886, however, Emperor Xizong was caught up in a conflict between the powerful eunuch Tian Lingzi and the warlords Wang Chongrong the military governor of Huguo Circuit (護國, headquartered in modern Yuncheng, Shanxi) and Li Keyong the military governor of Hedong Circuit (河東, headquartered in modern Taiyuan, Shanxi), and was forced to flee Chang'an again when Wang and Li defeated Tian and Tian's allies Zhu Mei the military governor of Jingnan Circuit (靜難, headquartered in modern Xianyang, Shaanxi) and Li Changfu the military governor of Fengxiang Circuit (鳳翔, headquartered in modern Baoji, Shaanxi). After the emperor fled to Xingyuan (興元, in modern Hanzhong, Shaanxi), Zhu declared Li Yun the Prince of Xiang emperor at Chang'an, and for a while, it appeared that Emperor Xizong's court at Xingyuan would be defeated and replaced. With Tian having resigned and been replaced at the imperial court by Yang Fugong, whose late adoptive brother Yang Fuguang had worked closely with Wang, Emperor Xizong had Yang Fugong write a letter to Wang urging him to again support Emperor Xizong; Liu was in charge of carrying this letter to Huguo and persuading Wang, and he was successful in doing so, eventually leading to Emperor Xizong's prevailing over Li Yun and being able to return to Chang'an. For Liu's accomplishments, he was made an imperial scholar (翰林學士, Hanlin Xueshi). He was later promoted to be the chief imperial scholar (翰林學士承旨, Hanlin Xueshi Chengzhi) and the deputy minister of census (戶部侍郎, Hubu Shilang), and later the deputy minister of defense (兵部侍郎, Bingbu Shilang). It was said that he served as an imperial scholar for four years.

== During Emperor Zhaozong's reign ==
In 889, by which time Emperor Xizong had died and been succeeded by his brother Emperor Zhaozong, Emperor Zhaozong made Liu Chongwang Zhongshu Shilang (中書侍郎)—the deputy head of the legislative bureau of government (中書省, Zhongshu Sheng)—and chancellor, with the designation Tong Zhongshu Menxia Pingzhangshi (同中書門下平章事). Liu also successively served, while chancellor, as the minister of defense (兵部尚書, Bingbu Shangshu) and minister of civil service affairs (吏部尚書, Libu Shangshu). In 890, when his chancellor colleague Zhang Jun and Kong Wei advocated a campaign against Li Keyong, Liu and another chancellor, Du Rangneng, opposed, but to no avail. After Li Keyong defeated the imperial troops and forced Emperor Zhaozong to remove Zhang and Kong, Liu remained chancellor, with his other posts changed to Menxia Shilang (門下侍郎)—the deputy head of the examination bureau (門下省, Menxia Sheng) and acting director of the treasury (知度支, Zhi Duzhi); he was also in charge of editing the imperial history.

By 891, the relationship between Emperor Zhaozong and Yang Fugong had deteriorated to such a point that Emperor Zhaozong forced Yang Fugong into retirement but became apprehensive that Yang Fugong and his adoptive nephew (Yang Fuguang's adoptive son) Yang Shouxin (楊守信) the commander of the Yushan Army (玉山軍) were planning a coup. He decided to act against Yang Fugong first by sending imperial guards under the officers Li Shunjie (李順節) and Li Shoujie (李守節) to attack Yang Fugong's mansion. However, the Yangs' soldiers were initially victorious. The other imperial guards, who were initially not involved in the battle, were planning to pillage the Chang'an markets in the confusion, but Liu met with them and persuaded them to be faithful to the emperor and join the battle against the Yangs, leading them personally. When the Yangs' soldiers saw that the other imperial soldiers were joining the battle, they collapsed and fled. Yang Fugong and Yang Shouxin fled to Xingyuan to join Yang Fuguang's adoptive son Yang Shouliang the military governor of Shannan West Circuit (山南西道, headquartered at Xingyuan) in an open revolt against the imperial government, but the Yangs were eventually defeated.

Meanwhile, the warlords Zhu Quanzhong the military governor of Xuanwu Circuit (宣武, headquartered in modern Kaifeng, Henan) and Shi Pu the military governor of Ganhua Circuit (感化, headquartered in modern Xuzhou, Jiangsu) had been locked into years of warfare, and by spring 892, Shi was near defeat, with his capital Xu Prefecture (徐州) under intense siege by Zhu. He sued for peace, and Zhu initially agreed—but demanded, as part of the peace terms, that he leave Ganhua. Zhu thereafter reported the situation to the imperial government and asked the imperial government to send a successor to Shi; in response, Emperor Zhaozong commissioned Liu as the new military governor of Ganhua, still carrying the Tong Zhongshu Menxia Pingzhangshi title as an honorary title, while recalling Shi to Chang'an. After Liu departed Chang'an, however, Shi came to believe that this was a trick by Zhu to get him out of Xu Prefecture to be killed, and so refused to leave the city; Liu turned around at Huayin (華陰, in modern Weinan, Shaanxi) and returned to Chang'an, but apparently did not resume his post as chancellor. (Xu Prefecture subsequently fell to Zhu, and Shi committed suicide.) Liu was later given the post of minister of worship (太常卿, Taichang Qing).

In 895, Wang Chongrong's brother and successor at Huguo, Wang Chongying, died, leading to a succession struggle between Wang Chongrong's adoptive son Wang Ke (biological son of another brother of Wang Chongrong's, Wang Chongjian (王重簡)), whom the soldiers supported as Wang Chongying's successor, and Wang Chongying's son Wang Gong, who was then the military governor of neighboring Baoyi Circuit (保義, headquartered in modern Sanmenxia, Henan) but wanted the more important Huguo Circuit. Li Keyong supported Wang Ke, while Wang Gong was supported by Li Maozhen the military governor of Fengxiang, Han Jian the military governor of Zhenguo Circuit (鎮國, headquartered in modern Weinan), and Wang Xingyu the military governor of Jingnan. Emperor Zhaozong tried to resolve the dispute by commissioning the chancellor Cui Yin as the military governor of Huguo. Upon hearing the remarks, Li Keyong's liaison Xue Zhiqin (薛志勤) publicly stated, "While Lord Cui is honored and virtuous, but if there is to be a replacement to Wang Ke, it is better to name Lord Liu of Guangde, as my lord respects him." (Liu was referred to as Lord Liu of Guangde because he lived at Guangde Block (光德坊).) Later in the year, when Li Maozhen, Wang Xingyu, and Han, upset that Emperor Zhaozong rejected their request, led their armies to Chang'an to force Emperor Zhaozong's hand and killed the chancellors Li Xi and Wei Zhaodu (whom they believed encouraged Emperor Zhaozong to resist them), they also forced Emperor Zhaozong to exile Liu to Zhao Prefecture (昭州, in modern Guilin, Guangxi) to serve as the military advisor to the prefect. After Li Keyong defeated Wang Xingyu later that year and forced Li Maozhen and Han to reconcile with the imperial government, Li Keyong spoke on Liu's behalf, and Liu, who had reached Jingnan Circuit (荊南, headquartered in modern Jingzhou, Hubei, not the same circuit Wang Xingyu ruled) on the way to exile, was recalled to Chang'an to serve as the minister of defense.

In 897, warfare between Wang Jian the military governor of Xichuan Circuit (西川, headquartered in modern Chengdu, Sichuan) and Gu Yanhui the military governor of Dongchuan Circuit (東川, headquartered in modern Mianyang, Sichuan) resulted in Gu's total defeat and suicide. In spring 898, Emperor Zhaozong, hoping to seize control of Dongchuan back, commissioned Liu the military governor of Dongchuan Circuit. However, when Liu was on the way to Dongchuan, the imperial government heard that Wang had already commissioned his adoptive son Wang Zongdi as the acting military governor of Dongchuan. Not wanting to create a conflict with Wang Jian, Emperor Zhaozong recalled Liu to serve as the minister of defense again and made Wang Zongdi the military governor of Dongchuan. Liu probably died in 900 and was given posthumous honors. One of his sons, Liu Jun, later became a chancellor for the Southern Han state of the subsequent Five Dynasties and Ten Kingdoms period.

== Notes and references ==
- Old Book of Tang, vol. 179.
- New Book of Tang, vol. 90.
- Zizhi Tongjian, vols. 256, 258, 259, 260, 261.
