= Wang Zongbi =

Shu general (died 925)

Wang Zongbi (Chinese: 王宗弼) (died 28 December 925) was a Chinese military general and politician of the Former Shu dynasty during the Five Dynasties and Ten Kingdoms period.

Born as Wei Hongfu (魏弘夫), he was a military commander and adoptive son of the founding emperor of the Former Shu kingdom, Wang Jian. He was also known as Gu Chen (顧琛) during the time he served under Gu Yanhui around 895. Wang Zongbi continued his rise in power during the reign of Wang Jian's son Wang Zongyan, first as Prince of Julu and then as Prince of Qi. In 925, after Former Shu suffered a number of key defeats at the hands of an invading Later Tang army, Wang Zongbi forced Wang Yan to surrender, hoping that would allow him to retain power in the Xichuan region (西川, i.e., the region around the Former Shu capital Chengdu). However, the deputy commander of the Later Tang army, Guo Chongtao, viewed Wang Zongbi as untrustworthy and put him to death.

== Early life ==
Wang Zongbi was born Wei Hongfu (魏弘夫). It is not known when Wei Hongfu was born, but it is known that he was from Xu Prefecture (許州) in modern Xuchang, Henan.

At some point he was adopted by Wang Jian – who adopted many officers serving under him as sons – and had his name changed to Wang Zongbi. This was before 887, when Wang Jian ruled Lang Prefecture (閬州, in modern Nanchong, Sichuan) as its self-proclaimed prefect. In 887, Wang Jian decided to answer the summons of his own adoptive father, the eunuch general Tian Lingzi, to serve under Tian's brother Chen Jingxuan, who was the military governor of Xichuan Circuit (西川, headquartered in modern Chengdu, Sichuan). As a result, Wang Jian left most of his family with his ally Gu Yanlang, the military governor of Dongchuan Circuit (東川, headquartered in modern Mianyang, Sichuan). He headed toward Xichuan's capital Chengdu with nephew Wang Zonghui (王宗鐬) and adoptive sons Wang Zongbi, Wang Zongyao (王宗瑤), Wang Zongkan (王宗侃), Wang Zongji, and Wang Zongbian (王宗弁).

Subsequently, when Chen regretted his decision and tried to stop Wang Jian from coming to Chengdu, Wang Jian broke with him, igniting a war that eventually resulted in Wang Jian's victory and seizure of Xichuan Circuit in 891.

== Service under Wang Jian and Gu Yanhui during the Tang dynasty ==
During Wang Jian's campaign to capture Xichuan, Gu Yanlang died and was succeeded by his brother Gu Yanhui at Dongchuan. Wang Jian and Gu Yanlang were friends while both served in the imperial Shence Army; therefore while Gu Yanlang was alive he did not consider seizing Dongchuan, but he began considering so after Gu Yanlang's death while outwardly remaining Gu Yanhui's ally. In late 891, Dongchuan was attacked by Yang Shouliang, the military governor of Shannan West Circuit (山南西道, headquartered in modern Hanzhong, Shaanxi), and Gu Yanhui sought aid from Wang Jian. Wang Jian sent Wang Zongbi, Hua Hong, Li Jian (李簡), and Wang Zongkan to aid Dongchuan, but he secretly instructed them that "After you defeat the enemy, Gu Yanhui will surely invite you to a feast. You should ask that it be held in the military camp, and then use the opportunity to seize him, so that we do not need another campaign." After the Xichuan army defeated the Shannan West army and forced its withdrawal, Gu was indeed planning on holding such a feast. However, Wang Zongbi revealed the plan to Gu, for reasons lost to history. Gu claimed an illness and refused to exit Dongchuan's capital Zi Prefecture (梓州). This incident ended the alliance between Wang's Xichuan and Gu's Dongchuan.

In 895, while Wang Jian and Gu Yanhui were locked in a war, Wang Zongbi was captured while attacking Dongchuan. Gu, remembering what Wang Zongbi had revealed to him, spared him and adopted him as a son, changing his name to Gu Chen. By 897, however, Gu was in desperate straits. His own forces and those of his ally Li Maozhen, the military governor of Fengxiang Circuit (鳳翔, headquartered in modern Baoji, Shaanxi), had been repeatedly defeated by Wang Jian's forces, leaving Zi Prefecture under siege with no forthcoming aid. Gu gathered his family members, including adoptive sons, and prepared for group suicide. Just before his death, however, Gu stated that Gu Chen had not been his adoptive son for a long time and had no need to die with them, so he pointed at the breaches in the city wall and told Gu Chen to leave. Adoptive son Gu Yao (顧瑤) then killed Gu Yanhui and the other Gu family members before committing suicide himself.

Gu Chen returned to the name Wang Zongbi and served under Wang Jian again.

== Former Shu kingdom ==
=== During Wang Jian's reign ===
In 907, the Tang throne was seized by Zhu Quanzhong, the military governor of Xuanwu Circuit (宣武, headquartered in modern Kaifeng, Henan), who started a new Later Liang as its Emperor Taizu. In response, Wang Jian – who carried the title of Prince of Shu at the time – issued declarations to start a campaign against Later Liang and restore Tang. His allies were Yang Wo, the Prince of Hongnong and the military governor of Huainan Circuit (淮南, headquartered in modern Yangzhou, Jiangsu); Li Keyong, the Prince of Jin and the military governor of Hedong Circuit (河東, headquartered in modern Taiyuan, Shanxi); and Li Maozhen, who then carried the title of Prince of Qi. However, Later Liang vassals did not defect in accordance with the declarations, so Wang Jian himself declared a new state of Shu (known historically as the kingdom of Former Shu) with himself as emperor. Wang Zongbi continued to serve in the military of the new Former Shu state, although his initial responsibilities were not recorded in history.

In 911, Li Maozhen's state of Qi, which had been an ally of Former Shu, broke that alliance and attacked Former Shu. Wang Zongbi served in the campaign against Qi and was successful in repelling the Qi general Liu Zhijun. Other Former Shu generals defeated other Qi generals, and Qi forces were forced to withdraw.

As of 918, Wang Zongbi was serving as the commander of the forces against Qi, when Wang Jian became seriously ill. Because Wang Jian considered Wang Zongbi to be calm and full of strategies, he judged Wang Zongbi as an appropriate assistant to his designated heir, the Crown Prince Wang Zongyan, in ruling the state. He thus summoned Wang Zongbi back from the northern border with Qi and put him in command of the palace guards. While Wang Jian was near death, his overseer of imperial stables, Tang Wenyi (唐文扆) tried to start a coup to monopolize power, but Tang's plot was reported to Wang Zongbi and the other senior officials by Tang's subordinate Pan Zaiying (潘在迎). As a result, Tang was exiled (and later executed), and Wang Jian subsequently entrusted Wang Zongyan to four of his adopted sons – Wang Zongbi, Wang Zongyao, Wang Zongwan (王宗綰) and Wang Zongkui (王宗夔) – and the eunuch Song Guangsi (宋光嗣). He then died, and Wang Zongyan took the throne under the name Wang Yan.

=== During Wang Yan's reign ===
Wang Yan created Wang Zongbi the Prince of Julu and also entrusted the governmental affairs to him. Wang Zongbi governed based on the bribes he received and his own likes and dislikes, while Wang Yan did not involve himself in administering the affairs of the state, preferring instead to travel and amuse himself. This was said to be the beginning of the Former Shu state's decline. Subsequently, the eunuch Song Guangsi yielded the command of the military to Wang Zongbi as well. At some point, Wang Zongbi's title was further upgraded to Prince of Qi.

By 923, Former Shu's previous main enemy, the Later Liang to the northeast, had been destroyed by Later Tang's founding emperor Emperor Zhuangzong. In 924, the Later Tang emperor sent his official Li Yan (李嚴) as an emissary to Former Shu, ostensibly to establish peaceful relations, while instead intending to spy on Former Shu's readiness. When Li returned to Later Tang, he reported to Emperor Zhuangzong that the Former Shu government, headed by Wang Zongbi and Song Guangsi, was corrupt and easily defeated, while Wang Yan was himself incompetent. Meanwhile, another of Wang Jian's adoptive son, Wang Zongchou (王宗儔), had become convinced that Wang Yan did not have the ability to govern the state, and he suggested to Wang Zongbi that Wang Yan be removed and replaced. Wang Zongbi hesitated, and Wang Zongchou subsequently died in distress. Wang Zongbi, instead, informed Song and Song's fellow eunuch Jing Runcheng (景潤澄) that Wang Zongchou had wanted to kill them and that he had stopped the plot, to cause them to be grateful to him.

In late 924, Wang Yan named Xu Yanqiong (徐延瓊), a relative of his mother Empress Dowager Xu, to replace Wang Zongbi as the commander of the imperial forces around the capital Chengdu. This caused dissent among the generals, as Wang Jian had left instructions not to let the Xu family members hold military commands, although Wang Zongbi's own reaction is unknown.

As of summer 925, Later Tang's Emperor Zhuangzong was ready to launch a major attack to conquer Former Shu. The campaign was nominally commanded by his son Li Jiji, the Prince of Wei, but actually commanded by the major general Guo Chongtao, nominally Li Jiji's deputy. The Former Shu administration was unaware of the impending attack, and Wang Yan, against the advice by Wang Zongbi and Empress Dowager Xu, insisted on visiting Tianxiong Circuit (天雄, headquartered in modern Tianshui, Gansu); he departed in winter 925, just as the Later Tang forces were entering Former Shu territory. Wang Chengjie (王承捷), the military governor of Wuxing Circuit (武興, headquartered in modern Baoji, Shaanxi), reported the emergency to Wang Yan and, after receiving no response, quickly surrendered. Only after the fall of Wuxing did Wang Yan become alarmed, but pursuant to the advice of Wang Zongbi and Song, he stayed at Li Prefecture (利州, in modern Guangyuan, Sichuan), while sending Wang Zongxun (王宗勳), Wang Zongyan (王宗儼, note different character than Wang Yan's original name), and Wang Zongyu (王宗昱) against the Later Tang forces. They, however, were defeated by the Later Tang forward commander Li Shaochen. Wang Yan fled back to Chengdu in fear, leaving Wang Zongbi in charge at Li Prefecture to continue the resistance. Wang Yan also ordered him to execute Wang Zongxun, Wang Zongyan, and Wang Zongyu. However, Former Shu generals were surrendering in droves – including Song's brother Song Guangbao (宋光葆), the acting military governor of Wude Circuit (武德, i.e., Dongchuan); Wang Chengzhao (王承肇), Wang Zongkan's son and the military governor of Wuding Circuit (武定, headquartered in modern Hanzhong, Shaanxi); and Wang Zongwei (王宗威) the military governor of Shannan Circuit (山南, headquartered in modern Hanzhong). Major general Guo subsequently wrote to Wang Zongbi to persuade him to surrender. Wang Zongbi abandoned Li Prefecture and rendezvoused with Wang Zongxun, Wang Zongyan, and Wang Zongyu at Baitiao (白芀, in modern Chengdu); he showed them the execution order and planned with them to surrender.

Wang Zongbi, resolved to surrender Wang Yan to Guo, thereafter returned to Chengdu. He seized Wang Yan, Empress Dowager Xu, and all of Wang Yan's sons, putting them under house arrest in the western palace. He then claimed the title of acting military governor of Xichuan and sent emissaries with gifts and food to comfort the Later Tang army. He also wrote a letter to emissary Li Yan in Wang Yan's name, stating that Wang Yan was ready to surrender. Li Yan subsequently arrived in Chengdu to meet with Wang Yan, and he also ordered Wang Zongbi to leave Chengdu defenseless to show good faith for surrendering. Meanwhile, Wang Zongbi, blaming the failure to surrender earlier on eunuchs Song Guangsi, Jing, Li Zhoulu (李周輅), and Ouyang Huang (歐陽晃); he executed them and presented their heads to Li Jiji. He also executed a number of other officials that he did not like, and many other officials bribed him to avoid death. Wang Zongbi subsequently sent his son Wang Chengban (王承班) to Li Jiji and Guo with a number of Wang Yan's beautiful concubines and ladies in waiting plus treasure, while making the request to be made the military governor of Xichuan. Li Jiji, however, responded, "These are all things that belong to my family now. It is not up to you to submit them as gifts."

On 15 December 925, Li Jiji and Guo arrived at Chengdu. Wang Yan and the Former Shu officials, with Li Yan leading the procession, formally surrendered to Li Jiji. This ended Former Shu's existence as a state.

== After surrender to Later Tang ==
Meanwhile, Wang Zongbi increased his lobbying of Guo Chongtao – including large bribes – to recommend him as the military governor of Xichuan. Guo pretended to agree, but did not actually do so. Wang Zongbi then conducted a campaign to undermine Guo: as Li Jiji's trusted eunuch Li Congxi (李從襲) whispered doubts of Guo's loyalty in his ear, Wang Zongbi led a group of Former Shu officials to meet with Li Jiji and request that Guo be made the military governor of Xichuan, with the aim of making Li Jiji distrust Guo. Meanwhile, however, Song Guangbao submitted an accusation to Guo that Wang Zongbi had falsely accused Song Guangsi and the others whom he had executed. Furthermore, Wang Zongbi's bribes were not sufficient: Guo was not receiving enough treasure to distribute to the Later Tang soldiers as rewards, and the soldiers were becoming angry that they were not being rewarded to their satisfaction. All of this led Guo to decide that Wang Zongbi was unsafe and must be eliminated.

On 28 December 925, after requesting and receiving permission from Li Jiji, Guo arrested Wang Zongbi, Wang Zongxun, and Wang Zongwo (王宗渥) under the accusations of disloyalty. He then executed the three men and their families. It was said that the Former Shu officials, hating Wang Zongbi for selling out the state, rushed to eat his flesh.

== See also ==
- Five Dynasties and Ten Kingdoms period
- New Book of Tang, presented in 1060
- Zizhi Tongjian ("Comprehensive Mirror to Aid in Government"), presented in 1084
- Spring and Autumn Annals of the Ten Kingdoms, compiled in the 1600s
