= Gu Yanhui =

Gu Yanhui (顧彥暉) (d. November 16, 897) was a warlord late in the Chinese Tang dynasty, who controlled Dongchuan Circuit (東川, headquartered in modern Mianyang, Sichuan) from 891, when he succeeded his brother Gu Yanlang, to 897, when he, facing defeat against one-time ally Wang Jian, committed suicide with his family members.

== Background ==
It is not known when Gu Yanhui was born. According to his biography in the New Book of Tang, he was from Feng Prefecture (豐州, in modern Bayan Nur, Inner Mongolia). Both he and his older brother Gu Yanlang served as junior officers at Tiande (天德, in modern Bayan Nur). The defender of Tiande, Cai Jing (蔡京), considered both of them to have appearances that indicated that they would be later successful, and therefore had his son give them money. During the subsequent major agrarian rebellion led by Huang Chao, Gu Yanlang and Gu Yanhui served in the campaign against Huang and participated in Tang's recapture of the capital Chang'an from Huang. Gu Yanlang was subsequently made a general of the imperial guards.

In 887, then-reigning Emperor Xizong made Gu Yanlang the military governor (jiedushi) of Dongchuan Circuit. Once he reported to his new post, Gu Yanlang made Gu Yanhui the prefect of Han Prefecture (漢州, in modern Deyang, Sichuan).

Meanwhile, a former colleague of Gu Yanlang's in the imperial guards corps, Wang Jian, had seized Lang Prefecture (閬州, in modern Nanchong, Sichuan) and claimed the title of prefect, and was sending the troops under him to raid the nearby regions, but remained in friendly relations with Gu Yanlang. Chen Jingxuan the military governor of Xichuan Circuit (西川, headquartered in modern Chengdu, Sichuan) became apprehensive that Gu and Wang might join their forces and attack Xichuan. Chen's brother, the former paramount eunuch Tian Lingzi, who had previously adopted Wang as a son, suggested that he would be able to summon Wang to serve under Chen. Chen agreed, and Tian subsequently wrote a letter inviting Wang to serve under Chen. Wang, receiving Tian's summons, initially indicated that he agreed, and he left his family at Dongchuan's capital Zi Prefecture (梓州) with Gu, while he himself headed toward Xichuan's capital Chengdu. However, while Wang was on his way, Chen's subordinate Li Ai (李乂) persuaded Chen that Wang could not be trusted, and Chen tried to stop Wang. Wang, however, would not stop, and he defeated officers Chen sent to stop him and proceeded to Chengdu. Gu then launched an army under Gu Yanhui's command to aid Wang. They put Chengdu under siege, but could not capture it, so they lifted the siege.

Wang, however, continued the campaign against Chen, and he raided and seized a number of prefectures of Xichuan Circuit. After Emperor Xizong died in 888 and was succeeded by his brother Emperor Zhaozong—who had despised Tian—Wang submitted a petition to Emperor Zhaozong that argued that Chen and Tian were renegades against imperial rule and that the imperial government should launch a campaign against them, and Gu Yanlang joined Wang's petition as well. Emperor Zhaozong thereafter commissioned the chancellor Wei Zhaodu as the new military governor of Xichuan and summoned Chen back to Chang'an to serve as a general of the imperial guards. When Chen refused, Emperor Zhaozong declared a general campaign against Chen, with Wei in command and Gu, Wang, and Yang Shouliang the military governor of Shannan West Circuit (山南西道, headquartered in modern Hanzhong, Shaanxi) serving as Wei's deputies.

The campaign lasted for years. By 891, Chen was in a desperate state, but the imperial government's resources had become drained due to a recent defeat in a campaign against another warlord, Li Keyong the military governor of Hedong Circuit (河東, headquartered in modern Taiyuan, Shanxi). Emperor Zhaozong decided to end the campaign against Chen; he issued an edict restoring Chen's offices and ordering Gu and Wang to withdraw their troops. Wang, however, saw that Chen was near defeat, and he intimidated Wei into returning to Chang'an and leaving him in command of the operations. Chen and Tian surrendered, and Wang became the military governor of Xichuan. Soon thereafter, Gu died, and Gu Yanhui took over as the acting military governor of Dongchuan.

== As military governor of Dongchuan ==
Later in the year, Emperor Zhaozong was set to make Gu Yanhui full military governor of Dongchuan, and he sent the eunuch Song Daobi (宋道弼) to deliver the staff and banner that showed imperial sanction to Gu. Yang Shouliang, who had by that point turned against the imperial government along with his adoptive father, the once-powerful eunuch Yang Fugong, had his adoptive brother Yang Shouhou (楊守厚) the prefect of Mian Prefecture (綿州, in modern Mianyang) intercept and detain Song, and then attacked Zi Prefecture. Gu sought aid from Wang Jian, who, despite his prior friendship with Gu Yanlang, was not as endeared to Gu Yanhui and was secretly considering seizing Dongchuan. To that end, Wang sent his officers Hua Hong, Li Jian (李簡), Wang Zongkan (王宗侃), and Wang Zongbi to aid Dongchuan, but secretly instructed them that if they defeated the Shannan West troops and Gu held a feast to thank them, they should seize Gu at the feast and take over Dongchuan. After Wang Zongkan defeated Yang Shouhou and forced Yang Shouhou to withdraw, Gu was indeed ready to hold such a feast. For reasons lost to history, Wang Zongbi revealed Wang Jian's instructions to Gu, and Gu cancelled the feast under excuse that he was ill.

However, it appeared that for some time thereafter, there remained the appearance of an alliance between Wang Jian's Xichuan and Gu's Dongchuan, for, in 892, when Wang was attacking Yang Sheng (楊晟) the military governor of Weirong Circuit (威戎, headquartered in modern Chengdu) at Weirong's capital Peng Prefecture (彭州), Yang Sheng sought aid from Yang Shouhou and suggested that Yang Shouhou attack Zi Prefecture to force Wang to aid Dongchuan. Yang Shouhou did so, but when he did so, Gu's officer Dou Xingshi (竇行實), who had agreed to betray Gu from the inside, was discovered, and Gu killed him. Yang Shouhou was thus unable to take Zi. Yang Shouhou and his adoptive brothers Yang Shouzhong (楊守忠) and Yang Shouzhen (楊守貞) were thereafter forced to withdraw after Wang further sent Li Jian to defeat them.

Still, by spring 893, it appeared that the Wang/Gu alliance was over. Hearing that news, Li Maozhen the military governor of Fengxiang Circuit (鳳翔, headquartered in modern Baoji, Shaanxi), who had defeated Yang Shouliang and seized control of Shannan West and Wuding (武定, headquartered in modern Hanzhong) Circuits late in 892, wanted to make Gu an ally. He thus suggested to Emperor Zhaozong that he recommission Gu as full military governor. (Gu's commissioning was never carried out due to Yang Shouhou's seizure of Song, and therefore Gu continued to carry the acting military governor title through these years.) Emperor Zhaozong did so. Li Maozhen also sent his adoptive son Li Jimi (李繼密) with an army to Dongchuan to aid Gu. However, soon thereafter, Wang's forces defeated the joint Dongchuan and Fengxiang forces at Li Prefecture (利州, in modern Guangyuan, Sichuan). Gu sought peace with Wang and promised, as part of the terms, to terminate relations with Li Maozhen. Wang agreed to peace under those terms.

In 895, when Emperor Zhaozong temporarily fled the imperial capital Chang'an due to attempts by Li Maozhen and Wang Xingyu the military governor of Jingnan Circuit (靜難, headquartered in modern Xianyang, Shaanxi), he issued an edict requesting that Wang Jian and Gu come to his aid. Wang used this opportunity to accuse Gu of refusing to do so and seizing his food supplies, and thereafter sent Hua to attack Dongchuan. From this point on, there would be constant warfare between Xichuan and Dongchuan. During one of the battles late in 895, Dongchuan forces captured Wang Zongbi. Gu, remembering how Wang Zongbi had revealed Wang Jian's plot to him earlier, took Wang Zongbi as an adoptive son and changed his name to Gu Chen. Gu sought aid from Li Maozhen, but at that time, Li Maozhen was fearful of an attack from Zhu Quanzhong the military governor of Xuanwu Circuit (宣武, headquartered in modern Kaifeng, Henan) and therefore unable to aid him. Wang Jian, who had by 897 put Zi Prefecture under siege, also paid off a number of former agrarian rebel leaders that Gu had taken under his command and made prefects of various Dongchuan prefectures, such that they abandoned Gu and turned to Wang, making Gu's position further desperate.

In late 897, Gu gathered his family at a feast. He instructed his adoptive son Gu Yao (顧瑤) to kill him and the other Gu family members, and then commit suicide, and Gu Yao did so. Prior to doing so, however, Gu Yanhui stated to Gu Chen that since he had not been in his family long, that he did not have to die with them and should leave, so Gu Chen did so. Wang Jian thereafter took control of Dongchuan.

== Notes and references ==
- New Book of Tang, vol. 186.
- Zizhi Tongjian, vols. 257, 258, 259, 260, 261.
