= Liu Zhenghui =

Tang dynasty politician

- 刘政会
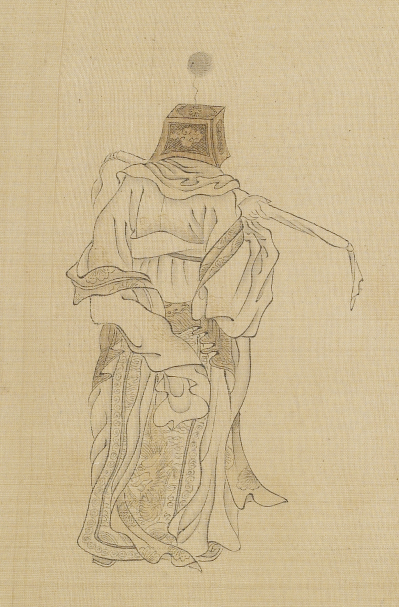

Personal details
- Born: Unknown; Zuocheng of Huazhou
- Died: 635; Hongzhou
- Children: Liu Xuanyi (son); Liu Qi (son)
- Parent: Liu Tan (father)
- Occupation: General, Official
- Title: Duke of Xing (邢国公, original); Duke of Yu (渝国公, posthumous)
- Posthumous name: Xiang (襄)

Liu Zhenghui (Chinese: 刘政会) was a minister and general during the early Tang dynasty. A descendant of Qubei, a Xiongnu prince during the Han dynasty, Liu Zhenghui was born in Huazhou and served as a vice officer (Sima) in the Yingyang Fu (regional military office) of Taiyuan during the Sui dynasty. His grandfather Liu Huanjuan was a chancellor during the Northern Qi dynasty. His father Liu Tan was the chief official of the Court of Judicature and Revision during the Sui dynasty. When Li Yuan rebelled against Sui in 617, Liu Zhenghui joined Li Yuan's rebel army. His first contribution to the establishment of the Tang dynasty was to help Li Yuan and Li Shimin execute Wang Wei and Gao Junya, two of Li Yuan's assistants sent by Emperor Yang of Sui as spies. During the early years of the Tang dynasty, Liu Zhenghui was appointed as a governor to guard and administer the Tang's homeland of Taiyuan. He was captured by Liu Wuzhou, a rival warlord based in northern Shanxi. In Liu Wuzhou's prison, Liu Zhenghui managed to send Li Yuan a letter addressing Liu Wuzhou's military strengths and strategies in detail, and that letter helped Li Shimin defeat Liu Wuzhou eventually. After he was rescued, Li Yuan restored his positions, and later promoted him to be the chief minister of the Ministry of Justice. Li Yuan also rewarded him with the Dukedom of Xing. In the early reign of Emperor Taizong of Tang, Liu Zhenghui was appointed as a regional military chief commander of Hongzhou. He died in 635, and Emperor Taizong acknowledged his great contribution to the establishment of the Tang. He is among the 24 meritorious officials of the Lingyan Pavilion. His elder son Liu Xuanyi inherited his title, which later changed to the Duke of Yu, and he married Emperor Taizong's third daughter Princess Pingnan. His younger son Liu Qi was framed by Wu Zetian's cruel officials in 690s and was executed. One of his 4th generation grandsons, Liu Fangping, was a famous poet, and one of his 7th generation grandsons, Liu Chongwang, was a chancellor during the reign of Emperor Zhaozong of Tang.
