= Feng Xingxi =

Chinese late Tang-era warlord (died 910)

Feng Xingxi (馮行襲) (died 31 July 910), courtesy name Zhengchen (正臣), formally Prince Zhongjing of Changle (長樂忠敬王), was a warlord late in the Chinese Tang dynasty who later became a subject of the succeeding Later Liang state. He was tall and strong and known as "Green Face Feng" for his green birthmark on his face.

== Background ==
It is not known when Feng Xingxi was born, but it is known that he was from Wudang (武當, in modern Shiyan, Hubei), and that he was known in his home territory for his strategies and his bravery. At one point, he became an officer at Jun Prefecture (均州), which Wudang was part of. In or shortly before 884, there was an incident where the agrarian rebel leader Sun Xi (孫喜) gathered several thousand people and prepared to attack Jun Prefecture. The prefect Lü Ye (呂燁) was panicking, but Feng reacted by hiding the troops and then personally, without escort, going to see Sun, to state to him:

The people of the prefecture will be glad to have you as our good prefect. But your followers, Lord, are too numerous. The people of the prefecture fear their pillaging, and therefore are afraid of you. You should leave your army north of the river [(i.e., the Han River)] and just take your closest followers with you on horses. I, Feng Xingxi, will serve as your forward messenger to report to the people of the prefecture. They will surely submit to you.

Sun was pleased and did not suspect Feng. Once Sun crossed the river, the Jun Prefecture soldiers all went to Sun, ostensibly to show respect. The soldiers that Feng had hidden then ambushed Sun, and Feng himself killed Sun and the few followers he had with him. His army, left north of the Han River, collapsed and fled. Following his success Feng also had Lü Ye expelled. When Liu Jurong (劉巨容) the military governor (jiedushi) of Shannan East Circuit (山南東道, headquartered in modern Xiangyang, Hubei), which Jun Prefecture belonged to, reported this to then-reigning Emperor Xizong, who was then at Chengdu (the imperial capital Chang'an having fallen to the agrarian rebel Huang Chao at that time), Feng was commissioned as the prefect of Jun. Meanwhile, there were bandits to the west of Jun who frequently intercepted the tributes that the eastern circuits were submitting to Emperor Xizong at Chengdu. Feng attacked and killed them, to ensure that the tributes would properly reach Emperor Xizong. At one subsequent point, when Li Maozhen the military governor of Fengxiang Circuit (鳳翔, headquartered in modern Baoji, Shaanxi) sent his adoptive son Li Jizhen (李繼臻) to occupy Jin Prefecture (金州, in modern Ankang, Shaanxi), Feng attacked Li Jizhen and took over Jin. The emperor (either Emperor Xizong or his brother and successor Emperor Zhaozong) thereafter made the defender (防禦使, Fangyushi) of a new Zhaoxin Circuit (昭信) with its capital at Jin Prefecture.

== As warlord in the late Tang dynasty ==
In 891, by which time the powerful eunuch Yang Fugong (who had helped Emperor Zhaozong become emperor after Emperor Xizong's death in 888) had a fall out with Emperor Zhaozong and started a rebellion against Emperor Zhaozong with his adoptive sons and nephews Yang Shouliang, Yang Shouzhong (楊守忠), Yang Shouzhen (楊守貞), and Yang Shouhou (楊守厚), Yang Shouliang wanted to try to attack Chang'an (where Emperor Zhaozong was at) through Feng Xingxi's territory, but Feng repelled his attack. (The Yangs were subsequently defeated by Li Maozhen.)

In 898, the status of Zhaoxin Circuit was upgraded, as Feng was made a military governor.

in 901, after a plan by Emperor Zhaozong and the chancellor Cui Yin to slaughter the eunuchs was discovered, the eunuch Han Quanhui forcibly took Emperor Zhaozong to Li Maozhen's Fengxiang Circuit. Cui summoned the powerful warlord Zhu Quanzhong the military governor of Xuanwu Circuit (宣武, headquartered in modern Kaifeng, Henan) to Chang'an, and Zhu subsequently put Fengxiang's capital Fengxiang Municipality under siege. During the siege, Han sent some 20 eunuchs through Jin Prefecture, intending to have them head to the southeastern circuits to order the military governors there to attack Zhu. By this point, though, Feng (whose circuit had been renamed Rongzhao Circuit (戎昭)) had already sent his deputy military governor Lu Chongju (魯崇矩) to Zhu to submit to him, and when the eunuchs got to Jin Prefecture, Feng executed them and delivered the edicts that Han issued in Emperor Zhaozong's name that the eunuchs were carrying to Zhu.

In 904, Feng was additionally appointed military governor of Wuding Circuit (武定, headquartered in modern Hanzhong, Shaanxi). While Zhu Quanzhong later attacked and conquered Shannan East Circuit (山南東道, headquartered in modern Xiangyang, Hubei) and Jingnan Circuit (荊南, headquartered in modern Jingzhou, Hubei), Feng Xingxi sent his son Feng Xu (馮勖) to lead naval troops to Jun and Fang prefectures to gather with Zhu's troops.

In 905, Wang Jian the military governor of Xichuan Circuit (西川, headquartered in modern Chengdu, Sichuan) sent his adoptive son Wang Zonghe (王宗賀) to attack Rongzhao, and after Wang Zonghe achieved repeated victories against him, Feng abandoned Jin Prefecture and fled back to Jun Prefecture. Feng's officer Quan Shilang (全師朗) surrendered Jin to Wang Zonghe. (Wang Jian subsequently made Quan the defender of Jin and adopted him, changing his name to Wang Zonglang (王宗朗).) However, later in the year, after Wang Zonglang came to believe that he could not hold Jin, he burned the city and fled to Wang Jian's capital Chengdu. Feng retook it, but, finding it too damaged to serve as headquarters, received permission (probably from Zhu, as Emperor Zhaozong was well within Zhu's control by that point) to move the capital of the circuit to Jun Prefecture.

In 906, Rongzhao Circuit was abolished by Zhu's order (as Zhu believed that the people of Jin Prefecture did not like Feng as their governor); its prefectures were merged into Zhongyi Circuit (忠義, i.e., Shannan East). Feng himself was transferred to be the military governor of Kuangguo Circuit (匡國, headquartered in modern Xuchang, Henan).

== During Later Liang ==
After Zhu Quanzhong seized the throne in 907, ending Tang and starting a new Later Liang as its Emperor Taizu, Feng Xingxi continued to serve under Later Liang. When Emperor Taizu was set to offer sacrifices to heaven and earth as an emperor, Feng offered to attend to him during the ceremony, and offered a large amount of tribute; in response, Emperor Taizu treated him with great respect. Emperor Taizu also created him the Prince of Changle.

In 910, Feng fell gravely ill. Apparently fearing that Feng's soldiers (many of whom previously served under the major Tang rebel Qin Zongquan) or Feng's own family might try to seize control of Kuangguo Circuit, which was very close to the Later Liang capital Kaifeng, Emperor Taizu sent the imperial scholar Li Ting (李珽) to Kuangguo's capital Xu Prefecture to effectively take control of the circuit. Feng transferred his authorities to Li, and soon thereafter died.

== Notes and references ==
- New Book of Tang, vol. 186.
- History of the Five Dynasties, vol. 15.
- New History of the Five Dynasties, vol. 42.
- Zizhi Tongjian, vols. 256, 258, 261, 262, 265, 267.
