= Wang Zongdi =

Tang dynasty official

Wang Zongdi (王宗滌) (died 902), né Hua Hong (華洪), was an officer who, during the late years of the Chinese dynasty Tang dynasty, served under Wang Jian, the eventual founder of the Five Dynasties and Ten Kingdoms period state Former Shu, who adopted him as a son. Because of his contributions to Wang Jian's cause, he, like few under Wang Jian's command, was given military governorships (jiedushi). Wang Jian eventually became suspicious of his intentions and put him to death.

== Background and initial service under Wang Jian ==
It is not known when Hua Hong was born, but it is known that he was originally from Yingchuan (潁川, in modern Xuchang, Henan). (As Wang Jian himself started his military career at Zhongwu Circuit (忠武), which was headquartered at Yingchuan, Hua probably became Wang's follower while Wang served as an officer there.)

The first reference in history to a campaign involving Hua was in 891, soon after Wang had taken control of Xichuan Circuit (西川, headquartered in modern Chengdu, Sichuan), with the assistance of his ally Gu Yanlang the military governor of Dongchuan Circuit (東川, headquartered in modern Mianyang, Sichuan). That winter, after Gu Yanlang died and was succeeded by his brother Gu Yanhui, Yang Shouliang the military governor of Shannan West Circuit (山南西道, headquartered in modern Hanzhong, Shaanxi), who had recently joined a campaign of resistance against Emperor Zhaozong of Tang headed by his adoptive uncle, the eunuch Yang Fugong, attacked Dongchuan with the intent of seizing it from Gu Yanhui. Gu sought aid from Wang, and Wang sent Hua, along with the officer Li Jian (李簡) and his adoptive sons Wang Zongkan (王宗侃) and Wang Zongbi, to assist Gu against Yang Shouliang's forces. Wang Jian, however, secretly informed the Xichuan officers that he sent that, after they defeated Yang's forces, Gu would invite them to a feast, and that they should seize Gu at the feast so that he could take over Dongchuan without a campaign. After Wang Zongkan subsequently defeated Yang Shouliang's brother Yang Shouhou (楊守厚) to force Shannan West forces' retreat, however, Wang Zongbi leaked Wang Jian's instructions to Gu, and Gu took precautions and so was never seized by the Xichuan forces.

In 892, when Wang Jian sent his nephew Wang Zongyu (王宗裕), Wang Zongkan, and Hua to attack Yang Sheng (楊晟) the military governor of Weirong Circuit (威戎, also headquartered in modern Chengdu) at Weirong's capital Peng Prefecture (彭州), Yang Shouliang tried to come to Yang Sheng's aid by sending his officer Fu Zhao (符昭) to attack Xichuan's capital Chengdu. Wang Jian summoned Hua back to Chengdu to resist against Fu's attack. Hua led his forward troops personally and rushed back toward Chengdu, but pretended to have a much larger army by having his soldiers beat drums loudly. Fu, believing incorrectly that the Xichuan forces had all returned from Peng Prefecture, withdrew. Later in the year, when Wang Jian sent Hua to attack Yang Shouliang's forces at Lang Prefecture (閬州, in modern Nanchong, Sichuan), Hua defeated Yang's forces there.

In winter 895, Wang Jian began his campaign against Gu in earnest. As part of the operations at that time, Hua inflicted a great defeat against Dongchuan forces at Qiulin (楸林, modern location unknown), killing or capturing tens of thousands of Dongchuan soldiers. As Wang continued the campaign, Hua continued to be a major participant, and it was during the campaign, in 896, that Wang formally adopted him as a son (as Wang did with many officers), changing his name to Wang Zongdi.

== After adoption by Wang Jian ==
With Wang Jian's forces capturing Dongchuan's prefectures one by one and eventually putting Dongchuan's capital Zi Prefecture (梓州) under siege, Gu Yanhui committed suicide with his family members in summer 897. Wang Jian took over Dongchuan and made Wang Zongdi the acting military governor. (Emperor Zhaozong initially tried to make the imperial official Liu Chongwang (劉崇望) the new military governor of Dongchuan, but recalled Liu upon hearing that Wang Jian already made Wang Zongdi the acting military governor; he also confirmed Wang Zongdi as acting military governor.) Meanwhile, Wang Zongdi, believing that Dongchuan's territories were too vast to be effectively governed as one circuit, suggested that five prefectures be carved out of Dongchuan and be made into a circuit of their own; subsequently, Wang Jian suggested it to the imperial government, which approved of the proposal, so five prefectures were carved out into a new Wuxin Circuit (武信), with its capital at Sui Prefecture (遂州, in modern Suining, Sichuan).

In winter 898, Emperor Zhaozong officially commissioned Wang Zongdi as the military governor of Dongchuan. In 900, Wang Zongdi was given the honorary chancellor designation of Tong Zhongshu Menxia Pingzhangshi (同中書門下平章事). In 901, Wang Zongdi offered to resign on account of illness, and Wang Jian sent Wang Zongyu to replace him.

Later in 901, after the powerful eunuch Han Quanhui forced then-reigning Emperor Zhaozong of Tang to leave Chang'an to go to the territory of Han's ally Li Maozhen the military governor of Fengxiang Circuit (鳳翔, headquartered in modern Baoji, Shaanxi), Zhu Quanzhong the military governor of Xuanwu Circuit (宣武, headquartered in modern Kaifeng, Henan), whom Emperor Zhaozong's chancellor Cui Yin had just summoned in order to carry out Cui's plot of slaughtering the eunuchs (and whose plot Han was reacting to), attacked Fengxiang to try to recapture the emperor. Both Li and Zhu sought aid from Wang Jian. Wang Jian tried to play both sides by outwardly agreeing with Zhu and rebuking Li, but sent secret messengers to Fengxiang to encourage Li to hold out — while sending Wang Zongdi and another adoptive son, Wang Zongji, north to attack Shannan West Circuit, which Li possessed at the time. In 902, after a siege in which Wang Zongdi and his soldiers scaled the walls of Shannan West's capital Xingyuan (興元), Li's adoptive son Li Jimi (李繼密) the military governor of Shannan West surrendered it, allowing Wang Jian to take it under possession.

== Death ==
Wang Jian initially commissioned Wang Zongdi as the military governor of Shannan West, but Wang Zongji and several other generals, jealous of Wang Zongdi, submitted false accusations against Wang Zongdi. Wang Jian, who was already apprehensive of Wang Zongdi because Wang Zongdi's bravery impressed the soldiers, further was apprehensive that his own headquarters, which were painted red, were referred to by the people as the "Red Paint Tower" (畫紅樓, Hua Hong Lou). Wang Jian thus recalled Wang Zongdi to Chengdu and rebuked him over the accusations that Wang Zongji and the others laid against him. Wang Zongdi responded, "The Three Shus [(i.e., Xichuan, Dongchuan, and Shannan West)] have been pacified, while the Prince [(i.e., Wang Jian, who had been created the Prince of Shu by Emperor Zhaozong)] listens to false accusations. It is time to kill those with accomplishments." Wang Jian subsequently had his close associate Tang Daoxi get Wang Zongdi drunk, and then strangle him to death. It was said that when the people heard of Wang Zongdi's death, the merchants stopped their trades, and the soldiers in the barracks all cried. After Wang Jian established his own state of Former Shu in 907 as its emperor, he issued an edict in which, while continuing to blame Wang Zongdi for having improper ambitions, also recounted his accomplishments and posthumously restored his offices.

== Notes and references ==
- Spring and Autumn Annals of the Ten Kingdoms (十國春秋), vol. 39.
- Zizhi Tongjian, vols. 258, 259, 260, 261, 262, 263.
