= Wang Gong =

Warlord in later years of Tang dynasty

Wang Gong (Chinese: 王珙) (d. 899) was a warlord late in the Chinese Tang dynasty, who controlled Baoyi Circuit (保義, headquartered in modern Sanmenxia, Henan) from 887, when he succeeded his father Wang Chongying, to his death in 899.

== Background ==
Little is known about Wang Gong's early years, and it is not known when he was born. The first historical reference to him was in 887, when his father Wang Chongying was serving as the military governor of Shanguo Circuit (陝虢, i.e., the same circuit that would later be known as Baoyi) and his uncle Wang Chongrong was serving as the military governor of Huguo Circuit (護國, headquartered in modern Yuncheng, Shanxi), which lay across the Yellow River from Shanguo. That year, Wang Chongrong was assassinated by his officer Chang Xingru (常行儒). Shortly after the assassination, then-reigning Emperor Xizong made Wang Chongying the military governor of Huguo and Wang Gong the acting military governor of Shanguo, keeping both circuits in the hands of the Wang family.

== As military governor of Baoyi ==
Wang Chongying died in 895. Wang Gong, who was referred to by that point as the military governor of Baoyi (as Shanguo had been renamed to Baoyi), coveted Huguo. However, the Huguo soldiers supported his cousin Wang Ke—a biological son of his uncle Wang Chongjian (王重簡) who had been adopted as a son by Wang Chongrong—to succeed Wang Chongying. Both Wang Gong and his brother Wang Yao (王瑤) the prefect of Jiang Prefecture (絳州, in modern Yuncheng) objected and attacked Wang Ke. They also wrote the major warlord Zhu Quanzhong the military governor of Xuanwu Circuit (宣武, headquartered in modern Kaifeng, Henan), claiming that Wang Ke was not actually biologically a member of the Wang family, while Wang Ke's father-in-law Li Keyong the military governor of Hedong Circuit (河東, headquartered in modern Taiyuan, Shanxi), who was the main rival to Zhu, supported Wang Ke.

Then-reigning Emperor Zhaozong (Emperor Xizong's brother and successor) tried to send imperial eunuchs to mediate, but the mediation was not successful. Wang Gong and Wang Yao, unable to prevail over Wang Ke, then requested that Emperor Zhaozong send an alternative military governor for Huguo, and Emperor Zhaozong initially commissioned the chancellor Cui Yin to be the military governor of Huguo. However, at Li Keyong's insistence, Emperor Zhaozong then commissioned Wang Ke as military governor of Huguo. When Wang Gong subsequently sent gifts to and persuaded three other warlords — Wang Xingyu the military governor of Jingnan Circuit (靜難, headquartered in modern Xianyang, Shaanxi), Li Maozhen the military governor of Fengxiang Circuit (鳳翔, headquartered in modern Baoji, Shaanxi), and Han Jian the military governor of Zhenguo Circuit (鎮國, headquartered in modern Weinan, Shaanxi) — to propose an alternative, that Wang Gong be given Huguo and Wang Ke be given Baoyi instead, Emperor Zhaozong rejected the proposal based on the fact that he had already granted Li Keyong's request. Subsequently, Wang Xingyu, Li Maozhen, and Han, embarrassed that their request was rejected, marched on to the capital Chang'an to threaten Emperor Zhaozong, and while they were there, they executed two former chancellors whom they perceived to be against them, Wei Zhaodu and Li Xi. Under duress, Emperor Zhaozong was forced to issue an edict making Wang Gong the military governor of Huguo, Wang Xingyu's brother Wang Xingyue (王行約) the military governor of Baoyi, and Wang Ke the military governor of Kuangguo Circuit (匡國, also in modern Weinan, which Wang Xingyue had governed).

The three warlords' actions drew a serious reaction from Li Keyong, who marched south from Hedong and prepared to attack them. When Li Keyong reached Jiang Prefecture, Wang Yao resisted him. Li Keyong quickly defeated and executed Wang Yao, and then marched on to the capital, eventually defeating Wang Xingyu, who fled but was killed in flight, and forcing Li Maozhen and Han into (temporary) submission to Emperor Zhaozong. In the aftermaths of this war, Wang Gong appeared to escape major repercussions, but was also unable to achieve his goal of taking over Huguo; rather, he remained at Baoyi.

In 897, Wang Gong launched another attack on Huguo, and this time he had the assistance from Zhu's generals Zhang Cunjing (張存敬) and Yang Shihou. They initially defeated Wang Ke just south of Yishi (猗氏, in modern Yuncheng), but Li Keyong's nephew Li Sizhao then defeated them, forcing them to stop the siege against Huguo. In 898, Baoyi and Xuanwu forces against attacked Huguo, and Li Keyong again sent Li Sizhao to help Wang Ke repel the attack.

Meanwhile, Wang Gong's rule of Baoyi was said to be violent, and imperial officials who went through Baoyi and who managed to offend him somehow where often arrested and killed. For example, in 898, when Emperor Zhaozong summoned the retired official Wang Zhu (王柷) to Chang'an, it was commonly speculated that Wang Zhu would next be made a chancellor. When Wang Zhu went through Baoyi on his way to Chang'an, Wang Gong initially accorded him great honor and wanted to meet him under ceremony that would make Wang Gong be like a son or nephew to him. When Wang Zhu refused, Wang Gong, in anger, killed Wang Zhu and his families and threw their bodies into the Yellow River, and then claimed to the imperial government that they had drowned when their ship capsized. The seriously weakened imperial government did not dare to investigate. By 899, it was said that Wang Gong had become so violent and paranoid that not even his wife and children could be secure that they could escape his wrath. Thereafter, he was killed in a mutiny, and the soldiers supported the officer Li Fan (李璠) to succeed him. Several months later, Li Fan was himself killed in a mutiny, and the officer Zhu Jian took over.

== Notes and references ==
- Old Book of Tang, vol. 182.
- New Book of Tang, vol. 187.
- Zizhi Tongjian, vols. 257, 260, 261.
