= Yang Shili =

Tang Chinese general

Yang Shili (楊師立) (d. June 29, 884?) was a general of the Chinese Tang dynasty, who came to control Dongchuan Circuit (東川, headquartered in modern Mianyang, Sichuan) as its military governor (jiedushi) due to his association with the powerful eunuch Tian Lingzi. He later had a fall out with Tian and Tian's brother Chen Jingxuan, however, and in a subsequent military confrontation, Chen's forces, under the command of Gao Renhou, defeated his. When his own army turned against him in light of its defeat, he committed suicide.

== Background and commission as military governor of Dongchuan ==
It is not known when Yang Shili was born or where he was from. It is known that he was a general of the eunuch-commanded Left Shence Army as of 880. That year, the powerful eunuch Tian Lingzi, who was in command of the Shence Armies, faced with the prospects that the court of Emperor Xizong would face threats from the ever-growing agrarian rebellions, began to prepare a contingency flight plan from the capital Chang'an to the Shu (蜀, i.e., modern Sichuan and Chongqing) region. Tian thus recommended four close associates—Yang, Tian's brother Chen Jingxuan, Niu Xu (牛勗), and Luo Yuangao (羅元杲)—to be candidates to be military governors of the three circuits covering the region—Xichuan (西川, headquartered in modern Chengdu, Sichuan), Dongchuan, and Shannan West (山南西道, headquartered in modern Hanzhong, Shaanxi). Emperor Xizong held a polo game for the four of them, with the stakes being that the best player would receive Xichuan. Chen did the best during that game, and therefore was given the most important of the three circuits, Xichuan. Later in the year, Yang was made the military governor of Dongchuan and Niu the military governor of Shannan West.

Around the new year 881, the major agrarian rebel Huang Chao captured Chang'an, forcing Emperor Xizong to flee toward Xichuan's capital Chengdu. He issued orders to Chen, Yang, and Niu, to keep the way to Chengdu open for him. Subsequently, when Emperor Xizong went through Mian Prefecture (綿州, in modern Mianyang) toward Chengdu, Yang paid homage to him there. In spring 883, while Emperor Xizong was still at Chengdu, he bestowed on Yang the honorary chancellor title of Tong Zhongshu Menxia Pingzhangshi (同中書門下平章事). At some point, he was also created the Duke of Zhongshan.

== Break with Tian Lingzi and Chen Jingxuan ==
However, although Yang Shili was a close associate of Tian Lingzi's earlier, he eventually became resentful of the tight control that Tian and Chen Jingxuan had of Emperor Xizong. In particular, he had heard rumors that when Chen sent the officer Gao Renhou against the agrarian rebel Han Xiusheng (韓秀升), Chen promised Dongchuan to Gao, and thus became angry that Chen promised his circuits to someone else without consulting with him. In spring 884, Tian, fearing that Yang would rise against him, decided to recall him to the imperial government to serve as You Pushe (右僕射), a highly honored position carrying little actual power. When Yang received the order, he was incensed and refused to follow the order; he executed the eunuch delivering the order as well as the eunuch monitor of Dongchuan, and rose, declaring that he was waging a campaign against Chen and declaring 10 crimes of Chen's. He advanced to Fucheng (涪城, in modern Mianyang) and sent his officer Hao Juan (郝蠲) to try to capture Mian Prefecture but was unable to do so. Emperor Xizong stripped him of his posts and commissioned Gao to be the acting military governor of Dongchuan to attack him.

Gao soon advanced to Deyang (德陽, in modern Deyang, Sichuan). Yang sent his officers Zheng Junxiong (鄭君雄) and Zhang Shi'an (張士安) to defend Lutou Pass (鹿頭關, in modern Deyang) to defend against Gao. Zheng and Zhang launched a night surprise attack against Gao's forces, initially having some successes and causing Gao's deputy, Yang Maoyan (楊茂言), to flee in panic. However, Gao launched his counterattack and crushed Dongchuan forces. He chased them to Lutou Pass and defeated them again there. They fled back to Dongchuan's capital Zi Prefecture (梓州, in modern Mianyang), which Gao put under siege.

Gao made initial attempts to capture the city but could not do so. He then made a declaration to the people in the city that he would stop attacking for 10 days, and that he would resume his attack in 10 days if Yang Shili's head were not delivered. Several days later, Zheng launched a mutiny against Yang and attacked his headquarters. Yang committed suicide; Zheng cut off his head, delivered it to Gao, and surrendered. Gao arrested Yang's family members and delivered them to Chengdu. Chen nailed Yang's son to the city wall. When Chen's sons came out to view him, he yelled, "This will soon happen to you. Be prepared to receive it!" Gao was given Dongchuan Circuit to succeed Yang.

== Notes and references ==
- Zizhi Tongjian, vols. 253, 254, 255, 256.
