= Wang Ke (Tang dynasty) =

Chinese Tang dynasty warlord

Wang Ke (王珂) was a warlord late in the Chinese Tang dynasty, who ruled Huguo Circuit (護國, headquartered in modern Yuncheng, Shanxi) as its military governor (jiedushi) from 895 (when he succeeded his uncle Wang Chongying) to 900 (when he was forced to surrender to Zhu Quanzhong the military governor of Xuanwu Circuit (宣武, headquartered in modern Kaifeng, Henan)).

== Background ==
His biological father Wang Chongjian (王重簡) was an older brother to Wang Chongrong, who would become a powerful warlord as the military governor of Huguo. As Wang Chongrong was sonless, he adopted Wang Ke as his own son. (Wang Ke's cousins Wang Gong and Wang Yao (王瑤) would later accuse Wang Ke of not being actually Wang blood but a servant in origin, but that accusation did not appear reliable even in contemporary times.) After Wang Chongrong was assassinated by his officer Chang Xingru (常行儒) in 887, then-reigning Emperor Xizong commissioned another older brother of Wang Chongrong's, Wang Chongying (Wang Gong's and Wang Yao's father), who was then the military governor of neighboring Shanguo Circuit (陝虢, headquartered in modern Sanmenxia, Henan) as the new military governor of Huguo, while making Wang Gong the acting military governor of Shanguo (and later, full military governor) and Wang Ke the commander of the armed forces (行軍司馬, Xingjun Sima) at Huguo.

In spring 895, Wang Chongying died. The soldiers at Huguo supported Wang Ke to be the acting military governor. However, Wang Gong, then still the military governor of Shanguo (which had been renamed Baoyi at that point), and Wang Yao, then the prefect of Jiang Prefecture (絳州, in modern Yuncheng) objected, and they claimed that Wang Ke was not actually of Wang blood. At Wang Gong's and Wang Yao's urging, then-reigning Emperor Zhaozong initially commissioned the chancellor Cui Yin to be the military governor of Huguo. However, Li Keyong the military governor of Hedong Circuit (河東, headquartered in modern Taiyuan, Shanxi), whose daughter was contracted to marry Wang Ke, submitted a petition to Emperor Zhaozong supporting Wang Ke, and Emperor Zhaozong subsequently agreed to commission Wang Ke military governor. When Wang Gong's allies Li Maozhen the military governor of Fengxiang Circuit (鳳翔, headquartered in modern Baoji, Shaanxi), Wang Xingyu the military governor of Jingnan Circuit (靜難, headquartered in modern Xianyang, Shaanxi), and Han Jian the military governor of Zhenguo Circuit (鎮國, headquartered in modern Weinan, Shaanxi) submitted a contrary proposal—to have Wang Gong made the military governor of Huguo and Wang Ke the military governor of Baoyi—Emperor Zhaozong rejected on the basis that he had already accepted Li Keyong's proposal.

Emperor Zhaozong's rejection of Li Maozhen's, Wang Xingyu's, and Han Jian's proposal brought a violent reaction from them, who marched on the imperial capital Chang'an and killed the chancellors Li Xi and Wei Zhaodu; they subsequently forced Emperor Zhaozong to issue a new edict moving Wang Gong to Huguo, Wang Xingyu's brother Wang Xingyue (王行約) from Kuangguo Circuit (匡國, also headquartered in modern Weinan) to Baoyi, and Wang Ke to Kuangguo. Meanwhile, Wang Xingyue was attacking Huguo, and Wang Ke sought aid from Li Keyong. Li Keyong, denouncing Li Maozhen, Wang Xingyu, and Han for killing Li Xi and Wei, marched south. When Wang Yao tried to block his path, he captured Jiang Prefecture and executed Wang Yao, and subsequently arrived at Huguo to rendezvous with Wang Ke. He then proceeded toward Jingnan. By the end of the year, Wang Xingyu had been defeated and was killed by his own subordinates in flight; Li Maozhen and Han were forced to sue for peace. Emperor Zhaozong then officially commissioned Wang Ke military governor of Huguo.

== As military governor ==
In 896, Emperor Zhaozong gave Wang Ke the honorary chancellor designation of Tong Zhongshu Menxia Pingzhangshi (同中書門下平章事).

In 897, Wang Gong attacked Wang Ke. Wang Ke sought aid from Li Keyong, while Wang Gong sought aid from Li Keyong's archenemy Zhu Quanzhong the military governor of Xuanwu Circuit. The Xuanwu forces, commanded by Zhu's generals Zhang Cunjing (張存敬) and Yang Shihou, were initially successful against Huguo forces, but the Hedong relief forces, commanded by Li Keyong's nephew Li Sizhao, then defeated Baoyi forces and lifted the siege against Huguo.

In 898, Wang Ke went to Hedong's capital Taiyuan to personally marry Li Keyong's daughter. During his absence from Huguo, Li Sizhao defended the circuit. Later in the year, Emperor Zhaozong bestowed the greater honorary chancellor title of Shizhong (侍中) on him. Later in 898, the Baoyi and Xuanwu forces again attacked Huguo; when Wang Ke sought aid from Hedong, Li Sizhao repelled the Baoyi and Xuanwu forces.

In late 900, Emperor Zhaozong was briefly deposed by a group of powerful eunuchs led by Liu Jishu. Wang Ke, when receiving the news, was incensed at the eunuchs, but before he could launch an army against them, Emperor Zhaozong was restored in a countercoup. Hearing of the emperor's restoration, Wang Ke was the first among military governors to submit tributes to the restored emperor, drawing imperial favor for him.

== Defeat and death ==
Meanwhile, though, the bad blood between Wang Ke and Zhu Quanzhong continued to develop. In particular, after Zhu made a major attack on Yang Xingmi the military governor of Huainan Circuit (淮南, headquartered in modern Yangzhou, Jiangsu) but was repelled by Yang, he persuaded Qian Liu the military governor of Zhenhai (鎮海, headquartered in modern Hangzhou, Zhejiang) and Zhendong (鎮東, headquartered in modern Shaoxing, Zhejiang) Circuits, Zhong Chuan the military governor of Zhennan Circuit (鎮南, headquartered in modern Nanchang, Jiangxi), Du Hong the military governor of Wuchang Circuit (武昌, headquartered in modern Wuhan, Hubei), and Wang Shifan the military governor of Pinglu Circuit (平盧, headquartered in modern Weifang, Shandong) to accuse Yang of aggression against them and request Emperor Zhaozong to appoint Zhu the commander of an operation against Yang. Wang Ke reacted by jointly submitting a petition with Li Keyong, Wang Rong the military governor of Chengde Circuit (成德, headquartered in modern Shijiazhuang, Hebei) and Wang Gao the military governor of Yiwu Circuit (義武, headquartered in modern Baoding, Hebei) accusing Zhu of aggression against them and asking that Yang be appointed the commander of an operation against Zhu. This allowed Emperor Zhaozong to decline both petitions. Meanwhile, by 901, Li Keyong had suffered defeats that caused his strength to wane, allowing Zhu to start reconsider another campaign to conquer Wang Ke's domain as a step in ultimately defeating Li Keyong. He stated to his generals:

Wang Ke lacked talent, but is arrogant and lazy because he has Hedong as his backing. I am about to cut this snake in half. May you, lords, tie him up with a rope.

Zhu then launched his attack, with he himself heading toward Huguo's capital Hezhong Municipality (河中), while sending Zhang Cunjing to attack Jin (晉州, in modern Linfen, Shanxi) and Jiang Prefectures to cut off any path of aid that Li Keyong might send. Jin and Jiang Prefectures were caught by surprise, and their prefects, Tao Jianzhao (陶建釗) and Zhang Hanyu (張漢瑜) quickly surrendered, allowing Zhu to cut off communications between Hezhong and Hedong Circuit. Meanwhile, Emperor Zhaozong, receiving words of the attack, tried to intervene by issuing an edict calling for peaceful resolution; Zhu ignored the edict. Li Keyong, receiving repeated calls for help from Wang Ke and Wang Ke's wife Lady Li but hearing that the Jin/Jiang path had been cut off, did not launch a relief force; instead, he suggested to Wang Ke that he abandon Huguo and flee to Chang'an. Wang Ke also sent request to Li Maozhen for aid, offering that, if Li Maozhen could repel Zhu, he would offer Huguo to Li Maozhen. Li Maozhen did not respond.

Unable to withstand Zhu's attack, Wang Ke tried to flee across the Yellow River toward Chang'an, but it happened that the bridge across the Yellow River was unusable at that time due to ice damage. With the morale of his troops low, Wang Ke decided to surrender. Trying to appease the Huguo people, Zhu declined Wang Ke's offer of surrendering in a ceremony in which Wang Ke, as the defeated, would bare his upper body, bind his own hands, and bring sheep out of the city; rather, under Zhu's direction, Wang Ke exited the city in full formal clothing, and was referred to as "Master" by Zhu. (Zhu had previously honored Wang Chongrong as an uncle because Wang Chongrong had been the one accepting his allegiance to Tang when he turned against the agrarian rebel Huang Chao and surrendered to Tang, and because Zhu's mother was surnamed Wang as well.)

After Wang Ke's surrender, Zhu commissioned Zhang as the acting military governor of Huguo, while relocating Wang Ke and his family to Xuanwu's capital Bian Prefecture (汴州). However, Zhu continued to be suspicious of Wang Ke due to Wang Ke's marriage to Li Keyong's daughter. He therefore sent Wang Ke on a journey to Chang'an to pay homage to the emperor but sent assassins to kill Wang when he reached Zhenguo.

== Notes and references ==
- Old Book of Tang, vol. 182.
- New Book of Tang, vol. 187.
- History of the Five Dynasties, vol. 14.
- New History of the Five Dynasties, vol. 42.
- Zizhi Tongjian, vols. 260, 261, 262.
