= Gao Renhou =

Tang Chinese army general

Gao Renhou (Chinese: 高仁厚) (d. 886) was an army general late in the Chinese Tang dynasty who served under the warlord Chen Jingxuan the military governor of Xichuan Circuit (西川, headquartered in modern Chengdu, Sichuan). Serving under Chen, he defeated the rebels Qian Neng (阡能), Han Xiusheng (韓秀升), and Qu Xingcong (屈行從), as well as Chen's rival Yang Shili the military governor of Dongchuan (東川, headquartered in modern Mianyang, Sichuan), after which Chen made him the military governor of Dongchuan. By 886, however, Chen, who had become suspicious of his intentions, attacked him and killed him.

== Background ==
Gao Renhou's origins had been lost to history even by the time that the New Book of Tang, which contained a biography of his, was written. However, it is known that he started his career as an officer under Chen Jingxuan the military governor of Xichuan, and that he became a commander of 2,000 of the 5,000 elite soldiers of Xichuan known as "Crow Corps," after the major agrarian rebel Huang Chao had captured the imperial capital Chang'an, forcing then-reigning Emperor Xizong to flee to Xichuan's capital Chengdu. As part of Chen's operations to prevent Huang from pursuing Emperor Xizong, he sent the Crow Corps north. At that time, many of the hoodlums of Chang'an had also fled Chang'an in light of Huang's attack and had greatly disturbed the lives of the people of the Baoji region. Gao attacked the hoodlums and killed thousands of them, thus pacifying the region.

== Campaign against Qian Neng ==
By 882, there were a number of agrarian rebellions against Chen Jingxuan's governance of Xichuan, with one of the most serious rebellions led by Qian Neng, who was formerly a local administrator who was set for punished for minor errors and thus rose in rebellion. Chen initially sent his officers Yang Xingqian (楊行遷), Hu Honglüe (胡洪略), and Mo Kuangshi (莫匡時) against these rebels, but they were largely ineffective; worse, to avoid being punished themselves, they often killed innocent civilians and claimed that the dead civilians were agrarian rebels. As a result, Qian was not only able to take over Qiong Prefecture where he initially started his rebellion, but advanced into Shu Prefecture (蜀州, in modern Chengdu as well). In winter 882, Chen decided to send Gao Renhou to replace Yang and to attack Qian.

Instead of repeating Yang's failed strategy of intense attacks on the rebels, Gao persuaded a spy that Qian had sent to spy on his troops to instead turn against Qian and persuade Qian's followers that Gao had no ill intent toward them and only wanted them to abandon their support of Qian. Gao then engaged Qian's lieutenant Luo Hunqing (羅渾擎) at Shuangliu (雙流, in modern Chengdu). The rebels under Luo, having been persuaded by the spy, surrendered in droves, and Gao captured Luo. He then had the surrendered rebels serve as his forward troops (to show that Gao was, indeed, not mistreating them) and further attacked Qian's lieutenants Ju Huseng (句胡僧) and Han Qiu (韓求); Ju was captured, and Han committed suicide. Gao then allowed the surrendered rebels to return to their homes safely, further causing the morale of Qian's followers to fail. Qian's remaining followers arrested him; his lieutenant Luo Fuzi (羅夫子) committed suicide. Gao, pursuant to his own promise, only had Qian, Luo Hunqing, and Ju, as well as Qian's propagandist Zhang Rong (張榮), executed, and killed no one else. Because of Gao's accomplishments against Qian, Chen made him the defender (防禦使, Fangyushi) of Mei Prefecture (眉州, in modern Meishan, Sichuan).

== Campaign against Han Xiusheng and Qu Xingcong ==
Meanwhile, Chen Jingxuan had had to deal with another agrarian rebellion, led by Han Xiusheng and Qu Xingcong, that began in summer 882 in the Three Gorges region. Chen sent the officer Zhuang Mengdie (莊夢蝶) against Han and Qu, but Zhuang was defeated by them and had to withdraw to Zhong Prefecture (忠州, in modern Chongqing). As a result, tributes from the circuits in the Yangtze River-Huai River region to the east were all cut off, causing Emperor Xizong's imperial government in exile to run out of funds and the salt supply for the people to run low. In spring 883, Chen sent Gao Renhou to attack Han and Qu instead, promising to have him made the military governor of Dongchuan if he succeeded. Instead of directly attacking Han and Qu immediately, Gao chose soldiers in his army who were good swimmers to scuttle Han and Qu's ships and sent raiders to burn Han and Qu's camps. Only after this did he attack. When Han's and Qu's followers began to surrender, they tried to counterattack by attacking the followers with swords; the angry followers instead captured them and surrendered them to Gao. When Gao interrogated them as to why they rebelled, he was impressed by their bold responses (blaming Tang misrule that started after the death of Emperor Xizong's well-regarded grandfather Emperor Xuānzong) and gave them good food, but still delivered them to Chengdu, where they were executed.

== Campaign against Yang Shili ==
When news of Chen Jingxuan's promise of having Gao Renhou made the military governor of Dongchuan reached Yang Shili the military governor of Dongchuan, however, Yang, who was previously Chen's ally but who had grown resentful of Chen over Chen's monopoly of the emperor's favors (due to Chen's brother Tian Lingzi's domination of the emperor, as the emperor's closest eunuch), became angry. Tian, believing that Yang would act against him and Chen, decided to act first, and in spring 884 recalled Yang to the imperial government to serve as You Pushe (右僕射), a highly honored official position with little power. In anger, Yang declared a campaign against Chen and Tian instead and launched troops to attack Xichuan.

Emperor Xizong issued an edict stripping Yang of his offices and making Gao the acting military governor of Dongchuan, to attack Yang Shili, with the Xichuan officer Yang Maoyan (楊茂言) serving as his deputy commander. Gao built 12 camps around Dongchuan's capital Zi Prefecture (梓州) to wear out Yang Shili's army. Yang Shili's officers Zheng Junxiong (鄭君雄) and Zhang Shi'an (張士安) reacted by launching a surprise attack against Gao's camps at night. Initially, Gao's troops were surprised, and when the Dongchuan forces concentrated their efforts on Yang Maoyan's camp, Yang Maoyan abandoned it and fled, causing many soldiers to panic and flee as well. The Dongchuan forces then attacked Gao's personal camp. Gao counterattacked and defeated them, forcing them back into the Zi city walls. Gao gathered up the soldiers and executed Yang Maoyan, and then resumed his siege of Zi.

Gao's siege, however, was not initially successful. He therefore sent public letters to Yang Shili's officers (by putting the letters on the arrows and then shooting the arrows over the city walls) that stated that he was not interested in killing Dongchuan soldiers, and that as long as they delivered Yang Shili's head, all will be spared. In response, Zheng started a mutiny against Yang Shili, who then committed suicide. Zheng surrendered the city. Thereafter, Gao was made the military governor of Dongchuan.

== Death ==
By 886, however, Chen Jingxuan had become suspicious of Gao Renhou's intentions, as Gao appeared to have cut off his communications with Chen by this point. It happened at that time, Zheng Junxiong, who had been made the prefect of Sui Prefecture (遂州, in modern Suining, Sichuan), attacked and captured Han Prefecture (漢州, in modern Deyang, Sichuan), and then marched on to Chengdu. Chen sent his officer Li Shunzhi (李順之) to defend against Zheng's attack, and Li defeated and killed Zheng. Chen then used this opportunity to mobilize the ethnic Qiang troops of Wei (維州) and Mao (茂州, both in modern Ngawa Tibetan and Qiang Autonomous Prefecture, Sichuan) Prefectures to attack Gao. They defeated and executed Gao. Gao was later posthumously honored in the Qianning (894-898) era of Emperor Xizong's brother Emperor Zhaozong (who had declared and waged a campaign against Chen).

== Bibliography ==
- Old Book of Tang, vol. 189.
- Zizhi Tongjian, vols. 255, 256.
