= Chen Jingxuan =

General of the Tang dynasty of China (died 893)

Chen Jingxuan (陳敬瑄) (d. April 26, 893) was a general of the Tang dynasty of China, who came to control Xichuan Circuit (西川), headquartered in modern Chengdu, Sichuan by virtue of his being an older brother of the eunuch Tian Lingzi, who controlled the court of Emperor Xizong during most of Emperor Xizong's reign. Later, when Emperor Xizong's brother and successor Emperor Zhaozong tried to recall Chen, Chen refused, leading to a general campaign against him. He was eventually defeated and killed by Wang Jian, who took over his territory and later founded the Five Dynasties and Ten Kingdoms period state Former Shu.

== Background and early career ==
It is not known when Chen Jingxuan was born. According to the Zizhi Tongjian, his family was from Xu Prefecture (許州, in modern Xuchang, Henan). He had at least two younger brothers, Chen Jingxun (陳敬珣) and one other who later became known as Tian Lingzi—as that younger brother became a eunuch in his young age and was adopted by a eunuch named Tian. He probably had two older brothers, as, at one point, Tian Lingzi referred to him as the third brother.

As of the start of the reign of Emperor Xizong (r. 873–888), Tian Lingzi became extremely powerful due to his close personal association with Emperor Xizong, such that Emperor Xizong even referred to him as "Father." Tian tried to intercede on Chen Jingxuan's behalf with Cui Anqian the military governor of Zhongwu Circuit (忠武, headquartered at Xu Prefecture) to have Chen made an officer under Cui, but Cui refused. Tian, therefore, had Chen come to the imperial capital Chang'an and made him an officer in the eunuch-commanded Left Shence Army (左神策軍), promoting him all the way to being a major general within a span of a few years.

== As military governor of Xichuan ==
=== Before Emperor Xizong's arrival in Chengdu ===
As of 880, Emperor Xizong's empire was being overrun by agrarian rebels, the strongest of whom was Huang Chao. Tian Lingzi was beginning to fear the possibility that Huang or another agrarian rebel may attack Chang'an, and therefore made a contingency plan to flee to the Shu (蜀, i.e., modern Sichuan and Chongqing) region. He recommended Chen and three other Left Shence Army generals that he trusted, Yang Shili, Niu Xu (牛勗), and Luo Yuangao (羅元杲) as potential military governors (Jiedushi) for the three circuits covering the region—Xichuan, Dongchuan (東川, headquartered in modern Mianyang, Sichuan), and Shannan West (山南西道, headquartered in modern Hanzhong, Shaanxi). Emperor Xizong held a polo game for the four of them, with the stakes being that the best player would receive Xichuan. Chen did the best during the game, and was therefore made the military governor of Xichuan, replacing Cui (who was then at Xichuan). (Yang was given Dongchuan, and Niu was given Shannan West.) As Chen was of humble origins and had no good reputation, when the news arrived in Xichuan that he would be the new military governor, the people of Xichuan were surprised, as they did not know who Chen was. A sorcerer from Qingcheng (青城, in modern Chengdu) thus falsely claimed that he was Chen; he arrived at government offices and began making orders. The officer Qu Dafu (瞿大夫), however, figured out that the sorcerer was fake, and therefore arrested and killed him, before Chen's arrival. Once Chen arrived and took office, it was said that he had a careful and timid character but was good at comforting his subordinates.

Around the new year 881, Huang captured Chang'an, forcing Emperor Xizong to flee to Shannan West's capital Xingyuan (興元), to be protected by Niu. When Chen received report of Emperor Xizong's flight, he summoned the eunuch monitor Liang Chuhou (梁處厚) and tearfully began the plans to welcome Emperor Xizong to Xichuan's capital Chengdu Municipality, including repairing an old palace for Emperor Xizong. He sent 3,000 soldiers to Xingyuan to protect Emperor Xizong. As Xingyuan had little food supplies, Tian persuaded Emperor Xizong to continue on to Chengdu, and Emperor Xizong agreed. He sent some imperial household servants to Chengdu first while he himself slowly progressed. When those servants viewed the palace that Chen was repairing and made insolent remarks about Chengdu being a barbaric place, Chen, in order to try to put the arrogance of the imperial servants in check, had those insolent servants arrested and executed. He then personally went to Lutou Pass (鹿頭關, in modern Deyang, Sichuan) to welcome Emperor Xizong and escort Emperor Xizong back to Chengdu. Emperor Xizong bestowed on him the honorary chancellor title of Tong Zhongshu Menxia Pingzhangshi (同中書門下平章事).

=== During Emperor Xizong's stay in Chengdu ===
After Emperor Xizong arrived at Chengdu, he gave initial rewards to the Xichuan army, but after he settled down, rewards were repeatedly given to the imperial guards who accompanied Emperor Xizong to Chengdu and stopped for the Xichuan army, drawing much resentment from the Xichuan forces. At a feast held by Tian Lingzi, the officer Guo Qi (郭琪) publicly objected and requested that rewards be balanced; Tian reacted by trying to poison Guo to death, but Guo survived. Guo then led a failed mutiny and then fled, but Chen Jingxuan spared his family.

Meanwhile, though, it was said that Chen's rule of Xichuan was becoming increasingly harsh, and he sent out secret police to monitor the local officials, which, on one occasion, led to false accusations against and the subsequent cruel execution of Xie Hongrang (謝弘讓) the defender of Ziyang Base (資陽鎮, in modern Ziyang, Sichuan). The officer Qian Neng (阡能), who had previously rebelled, refused to resubmit in light of Xie's cruel death, and he took over Qiong (邛州, in modern Chengdu) and Ya (雅州, in modern Ya'an, Sichuan) Prefectures and resisted Chen. Chen sent forces against Qian, but initially had no successes. Meanwhile, in summer 882, Emperor Xizong bestowed the greater honorary chancellor title of Shizhong (侍中) on him, and also created him the Duke of Liang and made his brother Chen Jingxun a prefectural prefect.

The Qian rebellion quickly grew, and by fall 882, it had grown out of Chen's control, as the commander Chen sent to suppress Qian's rebellion, Yang Xingqian (楊行遷), not only was unable to defeat Qian but was killing civilians to pretend that he was having success against Qian. Meanwhile, another rebellion led by Han Xiusheng (韓秀升) and Qu Xingcong (屈行從) rose in the Three Gorges region and cut off the supply route for Xichuan from the east. Chen sent the officer Zhuang Mengdie (莊夢蝶) to try to suppress it, with no success.

In winter 882, as the Qian rebellion had by that point grown and entered Shu Prefecture (蜀州, in modern Chengdu), Chen replaced Yang with Gao Renhou. Gao publicized his appeal that those who followed Qian would be pardoned entirely if they surrendered, and Qian's forces collapsed. Gao captured Qian and executed him and four other rebel leaders, as well as Qian's chief strategist Zhang Rong (張榮), but otherwise did not carry out any reprisals, a decision that Chen agreed with. Chen further made Gao the defender of Mei Prefecture (眉州, in modern Meishan, Sichuan).

In spring 883, with Zhuang repeatedly defeated by Han and Qu, cutting off all supplies from the east, Chen sent Gao to the Three Gorges region to attack them. Gao did so and was able to defeat them, reopening the Three Gorges supply route.

During the time that Emperor Xizong was at Chengdu, at Chen's suggestion, Emperor Xizong had agreed to enter a heqin marriage treaty with Hetuo. When the Hetuo emperor Longshun (隆舜) insisted on the treaty's implementation in 883, Emperor Xizong created an imperial clansman's daughter to be the Princess Anhua and married her to Longshun.

Meanwhile, Chen got into a dispute with the chancellor Zheng Tian over Zheng's refusal to allow Chen to have greater honors than the actual chancellors (as Zheng pointed to regulations that honorary chancellors were not to be regarded to be above actual chancellors). Chen and Tian Lingzi thus instigated an insistence by Li Changyan the military governor of Fengxiang Circuit (鳳翔, headquartered in modern Baoji, Shaanxi), who had previously rebelled against Zheng but who had later resubmitted to the Tang imperial government, that Zheng not be allowed through Fengxiang. (Tang forces had recaptured Chang'an from Huang Chao's state of Qi earlier in 883, and Emperor Xizong was then beginning to plan a return to Chang'an.) Faced with this situation, Zheng resigned. After Zheng's resignation, Chen was given the honorary chancellor title of Zhongshu Ling (中書令) and created the Prince of Yingchuan.

Meanwhile, Yang Shili, who had previously been closely associated with Tian Lingzi, had become dissatisfied with the hold that Tian and Chen had on the emperor, particularly becoming displeased when hearing rumors that Chen had promised to have Gao made the military governor of Dongchuan. In spring 884, Tian, knowing Yang's displeasure and worried that he would act militarily, ordered that he be recalled to the imperial government to serve as You Pushe (右僕射)—a highly honored position that carried few actual responsibilities. Yang, receiving the order, rejected it and mobilized against Chen. Emperor Xizong stripped Yang of his titles and ordered Gao to attack. Gao defeated Yang's officer Zheng Junxiong (鄭君雄) and put Dongchuan's capital Zi Prefecture (梓州) under siege. In summer 884, Zheng rose against Yang, and Yang committed suicide, allowing Gao to take Dongchuan. With the Dongchuan campaign over, Emperor Xizong departed Chengdu in spring 885 and headed back to Chang'an. Chen escorted the emperor as far as Han Prefecture (漢州, in modern Deyang) before heading back to Chengdu himself.

=== After Emperor Xizong's departure from Chengdu ===
After Emperor Xizong returned to Chang'an, Tian Lingzi continued to be in control of the imperial government, and he had Chen Jingxuan be officially made the overall overseer of not only Xichuan, but of also Dongchuan, Shannan West, and the Three Gorges region.

Meanwhile, though, by late 885, Tian was embroiled in a major dispute with Wang Chongrong the military governor of Hezhong Circuit (河中, headquartered in modern Yuncheng, Shanxi) over control of the salt ponds at Hezhong, and when he tried to transfer Wang, Wang refused. In a subsequent military confrontation between the forces of Wang and Wang's ally Li Keyong the military governor of Hedong Circuit (河東, headquartered in modern Taiyuan, Shanxi) and the forces of Tian (i.e., the Shence Armies) and his allies Zhu Mei the military governor of Jingnan Circuit (靜難, headquartered in modern Xianyang, Shaanxi) and Li Changyan's brother and successor Li Changfu, Tian and his allies were decisively defeated, causing Tian to again take Emperor Xizong and abandon Chang'an, fleeing to Xingyuan. Subsequently, Zhu and Li Changfu turned against Emperor Xizong as well, with Zhu going as far as supporting Emperor Xizong's distant relative Li Yun the Prince of Xiang as an alternative emperor. As Tian knew that he could not continue to hold on to power in the face of the public anger over his precipitating this confrontation with Wang, he resigned his post as the commander of the Shence Armies and had himself made the eunuch monitor of Xichuan, so that he could join Chen in Xichuan. (Tian's successor Yang Fugong was eventually to reconcile with Wang and Li Keyong. Zhu and Li Yun were killed, and Emperor Xizong was able to return to Chang'an.)

Around the same time, Chen began to suspect Gao Renhou might turn against him. It happened that at that time Zheng Junxiong, who had been made the prefect of Sui Prefecture (遂州, in modern Suining, Sichuan), rose in rebellion, capturing Han Prefecture and attacking Chengdu. Chen had his officer Li Shunzhi (李順之) engage Zheng, killing him. Chen then mobilized his forces and made a surprise attack against Gao, killing him. (Chen was unable to retain control of Dongchuan, however, as Emperor Xizong subsequently named the Shence Army general Gu Yanlang the new military governor of Dongchuan, and Chen appeared to make no attempt to prevent Gu from taking office.)

In spring 887, Emperor Xizong, who had returned to Chang'an, issued an edict stripping Tian Lingzi of his titles and exiling him to Duan Prefecture (端州, in modern Zhaoqing, Guangdong), but as Tian was under Chen's protection, that edict was never carried out.

By winter 887, Chen had become concerned that Gu and the former Shence Army officer Wang Jian—who had previously become an adopted son of Tian's but who had by this point seized Lang Prefecture (閬州, in modern Nanchong, Sichuan) without imperial approval—would ally with each other (as they had become friendly during their service together in the Shence Armies) and attack him. Tian suggested summoning Wang to Chengdu to serve under Chen, and Chen agreed. Tian thus wrote a letter to Wang summoning him. Wang, leaving his family members with Gu at Zi Prefecture, thus headed toward Chengdu. However, when Wang reached Lutou Pass, Chen's staff member Li Ai (李乂) warned Chen that Wang was dangerous, and Chen regretted and tried to stop Wang. Wang refused the order and proceeded all the way to Chengdu, defeating Chen's officers on the way. He captured Han Prefecture and gave control of it to Gu's brother Gu Yanhui, and Gu Yanlang and Wang subsequently attacked Chengdu but could not capture it. When Emperor Xizong sent eunuchs to try to mediate, neither Chen nor Wang accepted the mediation. It was said that Wang's campaign against Chen caused great damage to all 12 prefectures of Xichuan Circuit and that, as a result, Xichuan's routine tributes to the emperor stopped.

Emperor Xizong died in spring 888 and was succeeded by his brother Emperor Zhaozong, who had long hated Tian. Meanwhile, Wang was still unable to capture Chengdu, and therefore submitted a petition to Emperor Zhaozong that the imperial government send a new military governor of Xichuan, offering to serve under that new military governor. Gu Yanlang submitted a petition with a similar proposal as well. Emperor Zhaozong therefore made the chancellor Wei Zhaodu the new military governor of Xichuan and issued an order recalling Chen to serve as a major general of the Shence Armies. Chen, however, refused the order and prepared for battle against Wei. Emperor Zhaozong thus stripped him of all titles. (It was said that, however, after this point, Tian became effectively in control of Xichuan, making all key decisions.) Emperor Zhaozong commissioned Wei as the overall commander against Chen, with Yang Shouliang the military governor of Shannan West, Gu Yanlang, and Wang assisting, and carved out four prefectures of Xichuan to establish a new Yongping Circuit (永平, headquartered at Qiong Prefecture), making Wang the military governor of Yongping.

== Resistance against the imperial government ==
In spring 890, Wang Jian started a siege of Qiong Prefecture, intending to take it as his base of operations. All attempts that Chen Jingxuan made to relieve the siege of Qiong were defeated by Wang. Qiong fell to Wang in fall 890. Wang left his assistant Zhang Lin (張琳) in control at Qiong and returned to Chengdu, resuming the siege there. It was said that, in light of the resistance war that he was waging against the imperial government, Chen increased the tax burden greatly and imposed cruel punishments for those who hid assets, causing the people much grief.

By spring 891, however, given Wei's failure to capture Chengdu by this point and given the imperial government's recent defeat in a campaign against Li Keyong, Emperor Zhaozong decided to end the campaign. He restored Chen's titles and recalled Wei, while ordering Gu Yanlang and Wang to return to their circuits. By this point, though, Chengdu, under siege, was suffering from a serious famine that caused people of the city to resort to cannibalism, and Wang was unwilling to give up the campaign. He initially tried to persuade Wei to continue the campaign despite Emperor Zhaozong's order and, when Wei was unwilling to do so, intimidated Wei (by killing Wei's associate Luo Bao (駱保)) into giving him command of the imperial forces and returning to Chang'an by himself. Wang then resumed the siege against Chengdu.

By fall 891, Chengdu's situation was even more desperate, as Wang cut off the only remaining supply route that it had, from Weirong Circuit (威戎, headquartered in modern Chengdu), whose military governor Yang Sheng (楊晟) was a follower of Tian's. When Chen met with his army to try to encourage them to continue to resist, the soldiers stopped responding to him. Tian personally visited Wang at his camp and offered to surrender, and Wang accepted. Wang, who was then made the military governor of Xichuan, offered to continue to support Tian like a father, while making Chen's son Chen Tao (陳陶) the prefect of Ya Prefecture, having Chen Jingxuan go to Ya Prefecture as well to be with Chen Tao.

== Death ==
In 892, Wang Jian removed Chen Tao of his post as prefect of Ya Prefecture. Wang instead settled Chen Jingxuan at Xinjin (新津, in modern Chengdu), and supported Chen's household with the tax revenues of Xinjin County. However, he was continuously submitting petitions to Emperor Zhaozong requesting the executions of Chen and Tian Lingzi. Emperor Zhaozong never approved his petitions, and he decided to take initiative on his own. In summer 893, he falsely accused Chen and Tian of plotting treason, and he had Chen executed at Xinjin. Chen had long suspected that Wang would have him killed, and therefore carried poison in his belt so that he could commit suicide before an execution could occur, but as he was being arrested, he checked his belt, and the poison was no longer there. He was thereafter beheaded.

== Notes and references ==
- New Book of Tang, vol. 224, part 2.
- Zizhi Tongjian, vols. 253, 254, 255, 256, 257, 258, 259.
