= Yang Shouliang =

Warlord during later years of Tang dynasty

Yang Shouliang (楊守亮) (d. 892), né Zi Liang (訾亮), was a warlord late in the Chinese Tang dynasty, who controlled Shannan West Circuit (山南西道, headquartered in modern Hanzhong, Shaanxi) from 887 to 892. He was initially an agrarian rebel under Wang Xianzhi, but later came to serve under the imperial eunuch general Yang Fuguang, becoming Yang Fuguang's adoptive son. He was gradually promoted in the imperial guard ranks, and was eventually made the military governor (jiedushi) of Shannan West by Emperor Xizong. After his adoptive uncle Yang Fugong broke with Emperor Xizong's brother and successor Emperor Zhaozong in 891, however, Yang Shouliang followed Yang Fugong's lead and resisted the imperial government. He was subsequently defeated by the warlord Li Maozhen the military governor of Fengxiang Circuit (鳳翔, headquartered in modern Baoji, Shaanxi) and executed.

== Background ==
It is not known when Zi Liang was born, but it is known that he was from Cao Prefecture (曹州, in modern Heze, Shandong). Both he and his younger brother Zi Xin (訾信) became followers of the agrarian rebel Wang Xianzhi. After Wang's death in battle, they followed another agrarian rebel, Xu Tangju (徐唐莒), in pillaging Hong (洪州, in modern Nanchang, Jiangxi) and Rao (饒州, in modern Shangrao, Jiangxi) Prefectures. When the imperial eunuch general Yang Fuguang pacified the region, he captured Zi Liang and Zi Xin and made them his adoptive sons, changing their names to Yang Shouliang and Yang Shouxin (楊守信).

== As imperial guard officer ==
Yang Shouliang's activities during the subsequent years under his adoptive father Yang Fuguang were not clear. By 886, when Yang Fuguang had died and Yang Fuguang's adoptive brother Yang Fugong was the most powerful eunuch at the court of then-reigning Emperor Xizong—which was then in exile at Xingyuan (興元, in modern Hanzhong, Shaanxi), trying to fight off the rival claim to the Tang throne by Li Yun at the imperial capital Chang'an—Yang Shouliang was serving as the commander of one of the corps of the imperial guards, the Hubi Corps (扈蹕都); that summer, during the campaign against Li Yun and Li Yun's chief supporter Zhu Mei the military governor of Jingnan Circuit (靜難, headquartered in modern Xianyang, Shaanxi), Emperor Xizong commissioned Yang Shouliang as the military governor of Jinshang Circuit (金商, headquartered in modern Ankang, Shaanxi) and the controller (制置使, Zhizhishi) of the capital region, with the goal of attacking north from Jinshang's capital Jin Prefecture (金州) to recapture Chang'an with the forces of the military governors Wang Chongrong the military governor of Huguo Circuit (護國, headquartered in modern Yuncheng, Shanxi) and Li Keyong the military governor of Hedong Circuit (河東, headquartered in modern Taiyuan, Shanxi) (who had previously battled imperial forces but had returned their allegiance to Emperor Xizong by this point). It is unclear what progress, if any, Yang Shouliang actually made. Regardless, by spring 887, Zhu had been killed by his own subordinate Wang Xingyu; Li Yun fled to Wang Chongrong's domain and was executed by Wang Chongrong, ending his rival claim on the imperial throne. Yang Shouliang was thereafter made the military governor of Shannan West Circuit (headquartered at Xingyuan). (His adoptive brother/cousin Yang Shouzhong (楊守忠) succeeded him at Jinshang.)

== As military governor of Shannan West ==
One of the immediate concerns that Yang Shouliang had was with one of his subordinates, Wang Jian the prefect of Li Prefecture (利州, in modern Guangyuan, Sichuan), whom Yang feared for his might in battle. Yang made several summons of Wang to report to the circuit headquarters at Xingyuan, but Wang, fearing that Yang would take actions against him, refused. Instead, Wang attacked Lang Prefecture (閬州, in modern Nanchong, Sichuan), seized it, and claimed the title of defender of Lang. He also gathered more troops and supplies around him, making it even more difficult for Yang to exercise control over him.

By 888, Wang was locked in a campaign with Chen Jingxuan the military governor of Xichuan Circuit (西川, headquartered in modern Chengdu, Sichuan) and could not achieve victory over Chen. He petitioned then-reigning Emperor Zhaozong (Emperor Xizong's brother and successor, who was supported by Yang Fugong), who had previously grudges against Chen and Chen's brother, the eunuch Tian Lingzi, whom Chen was protecting, for the imperial government to be involved in the campaign. The imperial government, in response, sent the chancellor Wei Zhaodu to command the campaign against Chen, while making Yang, Wang, and Wang's ally Gu Yanlang the military governor of Dongchuan Circuit (東川, headquartered in modern Mianyang, Sichuan) Wei's assistants in the campaign. However, Yang's actual involvement in the campaign, if any, was not clearly stated in historical accounts. (By 891, the imperial government had given up on the campaign, but Wang then proceeded and defeated Chen, seizing Xichuan Circuit.)

Also by 891, Emperor Zhaozong and Yang Fugong had had a falling out, as Emperor Zhaozong despised Yang Fugong for his control of the palace. Yang Fugong particularly had an enmity with Emperor Zhaozong's maternal uncle Wang Gui (王瓌), and when Emperor Zhaozong wanted to make Wang Gui a military governor, Yang Fugong initially refused, causing even more tension between Yang Fugong and Wang Gui. Yang Fugong thus devised a plan to get rid of Wang Gui. He had Wang Gui made the military governor of Qiannan Circuit (黔南). (It is unclear where the headquarters of Qiannan Circuit was located, and, as the modern historian Bo Yang noted, it could have been a circuit that merely existed on paper that Yang Fugong created to get rid of Wang Gui.) As Wang Gui went through Shannan West Circuit on the way to his post, he was taking a ferry across a river at Jibo Ford (吉柏津, in modern Guangyuan, Sichuan), Yang Shouliang had the ferry scuttled, such that Wang Gui and all his family and staff members drowned. Emperor Zhaozong knew that this was Yang Fugong's idea, and his hatred for Yang Fugong intensified. He subsequently tried to make Yang Fugong the eunuch monitor of the army of Fengxiang Circuit (鳳翔, headquartered in modern Baoji, Shaanxi), but Yang Fugong refused, claiming that he was ill and wanted to retire. Emperor Zhaozong subsequently approved of his retirement.

In Yang Fugong's retirement, he met often with Yang Shouxin, who was then the commander of the Yushan Camp (玉山營). This led to rumors and accusations that Yang Fugong and Yang Shouxin were planning a coup against Emperor Zhaozong. In winter 891, Emperor Zhaozong acted preemptively, ordering the imperial guard commanders Li Shunjie (李順節, who had previously been an adoptive son of Yang Fugong's with the name Yang Shouli (楊守立)) and Li Shoujie (李守節) to attack Yang Fugong's mansion. When the chancellor Liu Chongwang subsequently arrived to encourage the imperial guards to attack, the Yangs' guards abandoned them. Yang Fugong and Yang Shouxin fled to Shannan West Circuit, and there, they, along with Yang Shouliang, Yang Shouzhong, and other adoptive sons/nephews of Yang Fugong's Yang Shouzhen (楊守貞) the military governor of Longjian Circuit (龍劍, headquartered in modern Mianyang) and Yang Shouhou (楊守厚) the prefect of Mian Prefecture (in modern Mianyang) in rising against the imperial government.

== In resistance to the imperial government and Li Maozhen ==
Initially, Yang Shouliang tried to attack and seize Dongchuan, which was then under the rule of Gu Yanlang's brother and successor Gu Yanhui, but was repelled by the joint forces of Xichuan and Dongchuan. When he tried to go through Jin Prefecture to attack Chang'an, he was intercepted and repelled by Feng Xingxi at Jin. In spring 892, five nearby military governors—Li Maozhen of Fengxiang, Wang Xingyu of Jingnan, Han Jian of Zhenguo Circuit (鎮國, headquartered in modern Weinan, Shaanxi), Wang Xingyue (王行約, Wang Xingyu's brother) of Kuangguo Circuit (匡國, headquartered in modern Weinan as well), and Li Maozhuang (李茂莊, Li Maozhen's brother) of Tianxiong (天雄, headquartered in modern Tianshui, Gansu)—apparently seeing this as an excellent opportunity to annex the Yangs' territory, submitted a joint petition requesting permission to attack the Yangs and requesting that Li Maozhen be put in command of the operations. Emperor Zhaozong, believing that if Li Maozhen took over the Yangs' territory, he would be even harder to control, ordered mediation, but no one accepted imperial mediation. Subsequently, Emperor Zhaozong felt compelled to agree with Li Maozhen's wishes, and so formally declared Li Maozhen the commander of the operations against the Yangs. Meanwhile, Yang Shouliang also entered into an alliance with Yang Sheng (楊晟), a former follower of Chen's and Tian's who was holding out at Peng Prefecture (彭州, in modern Chengdu) after their defeat, but the alliance did not yield results in subsequent battles with Wang Jian. Indeed, when Yang Shouliang sent his adoptive sons Yang Zishi (楊子實), Yang Ziqian (楊子遷), and Yang Zizhao (楊子釗) to aid Yang Sheng, the three of them, seeing that Yang Shouliang appeared to be headed for defeat, surrendered to Wang.

In fall 892, Li Maozhen captured Xingyuan. Yang Shouliang, along with Yang Fugong, Yang Shouxin, Yang Shouzhen, Yang Shouzhong, and another follower of Yang Fugong's, Man Cun (滿存), fled to Lang Prefecture. Wang Jian then sent his officer Hua Hong to attack them at Lang, and Hua defeated them but did not dislodge them. However, in fall 894, Li Maozhen attacked them at Lang and forced them to flee again—and this time, Yang Shouliang was only described as having fled with Yang Fugong and Yang Shouxin. They tried to go through Mount Shang (商山, in modern Shangluo, Shaanxi) to flee to Hedong Circuit (河東, headquartered in modern Taiyuan, Shanxi) to join Hedong's military governor Li Keyong, but when they got to Qianyuan (乾元, in modern Shangluo), they were captured by Han's troops and delivered to Han. When Yang Shouliang saw that 800 of Han's guards were formerly his soldiers, he stated to Han, "They were among those whom I treated well. None of them was willing to die for me. For you, Lord, to keep them around merely wastes your textiles and food. It is better to kill them." Han agreed. Yang Shouliang then asked to get a chance to plead his case with Emperor Zhaozong, and Han delivered him, Yang Fugong, and Yang Shouxin to Chang'an. However, when Emperor Zhaozong interrogated Yang Shouliang, he could not say anything. Emperor Zhaozong then had them executed.

== Notes and references ==
- New Book of Tang, vol. 186.
- Zizhi Tongjian, vols. 256, 257, 258, 259.
