= Wang Chongying =

Warlord in the Chinese Tang dynasty

Wang Chongying (Chinese: 王重盈) (d. February 12, 895) was a warlord late in the Chinese Tang dynasty who was known for his successive rules of Shanguo Circuit (陝虢, headquartered in modern Sanmenxia, Henan) and Huguo Circuit (護國, headquartered in modern Yuncheng, Shanxi) as military governor (jiedushi).

== Background ==
It is not known when Wang Chongying was born, and the official histories differ as to where his family was from — according to the Old Book of Tang, Hezhong Municipality (河中, in modern Yuncheng, Shanxi), and according to the New Book of Tang, Taiyuan Municipality. His father Wang Zong (王縱) was a successful military officer who reached the position of prefect of Yan Prefecture (鹽州, in modern Yulin, Shaanxi). Because of his father's contributions, both Wang Chongying and his younger brother Wang Chongrong served in the military as well, and both were known for their fierce fighting ability. Wang Chongying had at least one other brother, Wang Chongjian (王重簡), who was older than Wang Chongrong and Wang Chongying.

== Early career ==
At one point, Wang Chongying served as the prefect of Fen Prefecture (汾州, in modern Linfen, Shanxi). By 882 — by which point Wang Chongrong had taken over Hezhong Circuit (河中, headquartered at Hezhong Municipality) as its military governor and by which time the imperial capital Chang'an had fallen to the major agrarian rebel Huang Chao, forcing then-reigning Emperor Xizong to flee to Chengdu — Wang Chongying was serving as the governor (觀察使, Guanchashi) of Shanguo Circuit. That year, when Emperor Xizong put the chancellor Wang Duo in command of the operations against Huang (who had declared himself emperor of a new state of Qi), Wang Chongying was put in charge of supplying Wang Duo's army. After Tang forces defeated Qi forces in 883 and forced Huang to abandon Chang'an, Shanguo was made into a circuit that had a military governor, and Wang Chongying was made its military governor. In 885, Emperor Xizong bestowed the honorary chancellor designation of Tong Zhongshu Menxia Pingzhangshi (同中書門下平章事) on him.

== At Huguo Circuit ==
By 887, Wang Chongrong had grown harsh in his governance of Hezhong Circuit — which by that point had been renamed Huguo Circuit. When he humiliated the officer Chang Xingru (常行儒), Chang started a mutiny and killed him. Chang then requested that Wang Chongying succeed Wang Chongrong, a request that Emperor Xizong granted. Emperor Xizong also made Wang Chongying's son Wang Gong the acting military governor of Shanguo. After Wang Chongying arrived in Huguo and took office, he arrested Chang and put Chang to death.

In 888, faced with the repeated pillaging by Li Hanzhi the military governor of Heyang Circuit (河陽, headquartered in modern Jiaozuo, Henan), Wang Chongying persuaded Li's ally Zhang Quanyi the mayor of Henan Municipality (河南, i.e., the Luoyang region) to turn against Li; Zhang ambushed Li's headquarters at Heyang Circuit's capital Heyang successfully, forcing Li to flee, and thereafter took over the circuit. In 891, Emperor Xizong's brother and successor Emperor Zhaozong bestowed the greater honorary chancellor title of Zhongshu Ling (中書令) on Wang Chongying.

Wang Chongying died in 895. The soldiers supported Wang Chongrong's adoptive son Wang Ke — who was the biological son of Wang Chongjian's and therefore biological nephew to both Wang Chongrong and Wang Chongying — to succeed him, but Wang Gong, who had by that point become military governor of Shanguo, which had been renamed Baoyi (保義), also wished to have Huguo, leading to a succession struggle between them. Emperor Zhaozong, with Li Keyong the military governor of Hedong Circuit (河東, headquartered in modern Taiyuan, Shanxi), who was also Wang Ke's father-in-law, backing Wang Ke's claim, made Wang Ke military governor of Huguo.

== Notes and references ==
- Old Book of Tang, vol. 182.
- New Book of Tang, vol. 187.
- Zizhi Tongjian, vols. 254, 255, 256, 257, 258, 260.
