= Yang Fuguang =

Yang Fuguang (Chinese: 楊復光) (842–883), formally Duke Zhongsu of Hongnong (弘農忠肅公), was a Chinese eunuch, military general, and politician of the Tang dynasty, who was considered a major contributor to the Tang cause in finally defeating Huang Chao's rebellion.

== Background ==
Yang Fuguang was born in 842, during the reign of Emperor Wuzong. He was originally surnamed Qiao (喬) and was from the Min (閩) region—i.e., modern Fujian. At some point, he became an eunuch official and an adopted son of the powerful eunuch Yang Xuanjie (楊玄价), and therefore took the surname of Yang. It was said that Yang Fuguang was strong and self-motivated, impressing Yang Xuanjie. Because Yang Fuguang was considered to have military capabilities, he served several successive terms as eunuch monitor of armies. (Yang Fuguang was thus the adoptive cousin of another later-prominent eunuch, Yang Fugong, as Yang Fugong was the adopted son of Yang Xuanjie's adoptive brother Yang Xuanyi (楊玄翼).)

== During Emperor Xizong's reign ==
=== Before Huang Chao captured Chang'an ===
As of 876, Yang Fuguang was serving as the eunuch monitor of the army under the general Zeng Yuanyu (曾元裕), who was then serving as the deputy commander for Tang forces in the campaign against the agrarian rebel Wang Xianzhi. In 877, Yang sent messengers to Wang and persuaded him to surrender to Tang imperial forces. Wang agreed, and he sent his general Shang Junzhang (尚君長) to further discuss the matter with Yang. Zeng's superior Song Wei (宋威), however, ambushed and captured Shang on his way to Yang's camp. Song then submitted a report claiming that he had captured Shang in battle. Despite Yang's report that Shang was participating in Wang's negotiations to surrender, then-reigning Emperor Xizong believed Song's report and had Shang executed. In anger, Wang broke off negotiations and continued his rebellion. Subsequently, when the chancellor Wang Duo was put in overall command of the operations, Yang served as the eunuch monitor of his army.

By 880, when Wang Xianzhi had already been killed in battle but Huang Chao had in turn become the most powerful agrarian rebel figure, Yang Fuguang was serving as the eunuch monitor of Jingnan Circuit (荊南, headquartered in modern Jingzhou, Hubei), when, in the absence of a military governor (Jiedushi), he commissioned the officer Song Hao (宋浩) to oversee the circuit's affairs. Subsequently, though, when Song had a dispute with the officer Duan Yanmo over Song's punishment of some of Duan's soldiers, Duan killed Song. Yang subsequently submitted a report that indicated that Song's punishment was overly harsh, and Duan was not punished. (According to Yang's biography in the New Book of Tang, Yang encouraged Duan's actions because Song was disrespectful to Yang as well.) Subsequently, Yang was made the eunuch monitor at Zhongwu Circuit (忠武, headquartered in modern Xuchang, Henan).

=== After Huang Chao captured Chang'an ===
Late in 880, Huang Chao captured the imperial capital Chang'an, forcing Emperor Xizong to flee to Chengdu. A number of Tang generals submitted to Huang, who declared himself the emperor of a new state of Qi. Among those was the military governor of Zhongwu, Zhou Ji. One night, when Zhou invited Yang Fuguang to a feast, Yang's attendants, pointing out that Zhou had already submitted to Qi, Yang should fear whether Zhou would kill him. Yang pointed out that he needed to do what he could to persuade Zhou back to the Tang imperial cause and should do so despite dangers to himself, and so attended the feast. At the feast, Yang persuaded Zhou to rejoin the Tang cause, and he further sent his adopted son Yang Shouliang to assassinate Huang's emissary to Zhongwu. Subsequently, Yang organized the Zhongwu troops into eight corps, commanded by eight officers, including Lu Yanhong, Jin Hui (晉暉), Wang Jian, Han Jian, Zhang Zao (張造), Li Shitai (李師泰), and Pang Cong (龐從). The Zhongwu forces were able to repel the Qi forces under Zhu Wen, preserving Zhongwu's ability to resist Qi. In winter 881, Yang further advanced his troops to Wugong (武功, in modern Xianyang, Shaanxi), close to Chang'an, preparing to participate in the operations to recapture Chang'an from Huang. Tang forces subsequently briefly recaptured Chang'an, but Huang subsequently defeated them and took Chang'an again. Yang subsequently joined forces with Wang Chongrong the military governor of Hezhong Circuit (河中, headquartered in modern Yuncheng, Shanxi), and they persuaded Zhu, who then was at Tong Prefecture (同州, in modern Weinan, Shaanxi), to join the Tang cause as well.

However, Huang's army remained powerful, and Wang was apprehensive to directly act against Huang. Yang suggested that they enlist the aid of the Shatuo chieftain Li Keyong—who had previously rebelled against Tang and been branded a renegade. Yang submitted the proposal to Wang Duo (who was then again overseeing the operations against Huang), and Wang issued an edict in Emperor Xizong's name summoning Li Keyong. Li Keyong agreed, and he joined forces with Yang and Wang Chongrong, preparing to again attack Chang'an. In summer 883, with Li Keyong leading the operation, the imperial forces defeated Huang's, forcing Huang to abandon Chang'an and flee east. Subsequently, it was Yang who submitted the public report to Emperor Xizong proclaiming the victory at Chang'an. For his contributions, he was given the honorific title of Kaifu Yitong Sansi (開府儀同三司) and created the Duke of Hongnong.

Yang died later in 883, at Hezhong. It was said that because he had led the troops well, the troops greatly mourned his death. Yang had a large number of adopted sons (who were not eunuchs), and many of them would become key military officers.

== Notes and references ==
- Old Book of Tang, vol. 184.
- New Book of Tang, vol. 207.
- Zizhi Tongjian, vols. 252, 253, 254, 255.
