= Hua Prefecture (Henan) =

Prefecture in imperial China

Hua Prefecture (滑州): Yan Prefecture (兗州); Dong Commandery (東郡); Lingchang Commandery (靈昌郡)
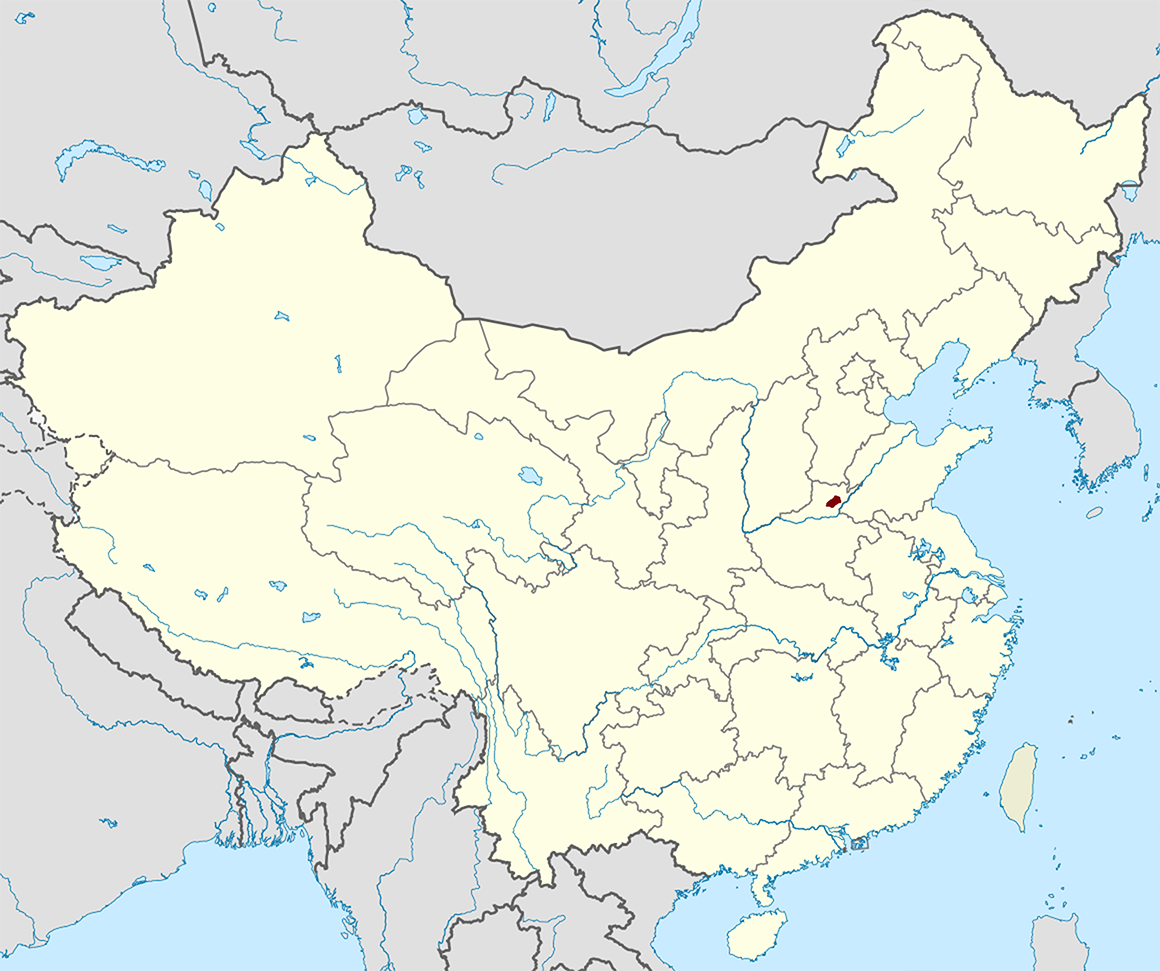
- Population
  - 740s or 750s: 422,790
  - 1100s: 81,988
- History
  - Created: 596 (Sui dynasty)
  - Abolished: 1374 (Ming dynasty)
- Contained within
  - Circuit: Tang dynasty: Henan Circuit; Song dynasty: Jingxi Circuit; Jingxi North Circuit

Hua Prefecture
- Chinese: 滑州
Transcriptions
Standard Mandarin
- Hanyu Pinyin: Huá Zhōu

Huazhou or Hua Prefecture was a zhou (prefecture) in imperial China seated in modern Hua County, Henan, China. It existed (intermittently) from 596 to 1374. Through history it was also known by other names, including Yan Prefecture (606–607), Dong Commandery (607–618) and Lingchang Commandery (742–758).

== Counties ==
During the Song dynasty, Hua Prefecture administered the following counties (縣):

1. Baima (白馬), roughly modern Hua County
2. Weicheng (韋城), also roughly modern Hua County
3. Zuocheng (胙城), Yanjin County
