= Yang Fugong =

Chinese eunuch and military general during the Tang dynasty

Yang Fugong (楊復恭; died 894), courtesy name Zike (子恪), formally the Duke of Wei (魏公), was a Chinese eunuch and military general during the Tang dynasty, playing key roles in the imperial administrations of Emperor Xizong and Emperor Xizong's brother Emperor Zhaozong. He was later suspected by Emperor Zhaozong of power-grabbing and removed, and afterwards encouraged his adopted sons/nephews Yang Shouliang, Yang Shouxin (楊守信), Yang Shouzhen (楊守貞), and Yang Shouzhong (楊守忠) into resisting the imperial government together. They were, however, defeated by the general Li Maozhen and captured while in flight; they were then delivered to the capital Chang'an and executed.

== Background ==
It is not known when Yang Fugong was born. He was originally surnamed Lin (林) until he, who apparently became an eunuch in his youth, became an adopted son of the eunuch Yang Xuanyi (楊玄翼), who was a director of the palace communications (Shumishi) during the middle of Emperor Yizong's Xiantong era (860–874). (He was thus adoptive cousin of another later-prominent eunuch, Yang Fuguang, who was the adopted son of Yang Xuanyi's adoptive brother Yang Xuanjie (楊玄价).) Yang Fugong was literate and well-learned, and subsequently successively served as a eunuch monitor for several imperial armies. During the Pang Xun rebellion of 868–869, Yang Fugong served as the eunuch monitor of the Heyang Circuit (河陽, headquartered in modern JIaozuo, Henan), and after Pang's rebellion was suppressed, Yang was credited and recalled to the capital Chang'an to serve as the palace-government liaison (宣徽使, Xuanhuishi). After Yang Xuanyi died in 870, Yang Fugong left governmental service for some time to observe a mourning period for him, but soon was recalled to serve as a director of palace communications.

== During Emperor Xizong's reign ==
As of 880, when Emperor Yizong's son Emperor Xizong was emperor, Yang Fugong's colleague Tian Lingzi was extremely powerful due to his personal relationship with Emperor Xizong. When the agrarian rebel Huang Chao was approaching Chang'an, Yang Fugong served as Tian's deputy when Tian was commanding the imperial Shence Armies (神策軍), traditionally commanded by eunuchs. Subsequently, under Tian's advice, Emperor Xizong abandoned Chang'an and fled to Chengdu, where Tian's brother Chen Jingxuan served as the military governor (jiedushi) of Xichuan Circuit (西川). It was said that due to Tian's control of the government, few dared to argue with him on policies, but Yang Fugong dared to, apparently partly because Yang Fugong's cousin Yang Fuguang then was in charge of one of the major Tang armies fighting against Huang (who had declared himself the emperor of a new state of Qi). After Yang Fuguang died in 883, however, Tian immediately had Yang Fugong demoted to be the director of the imperial stable (飛龍使, Feilongshi). Yang Fugong thus claimed to be ill and retired to his own mansion in Lantian (藍田, in modern Xi'an, Shaanxi).

In 885, by which time Huang's rebellion had been suppressed and Emperor Xizong had returned to Chang'an, Tian provoked the warlord Wang Chongrong (the military governor of Hezhong Circuit (河中, headquartered in modern Yuncheng, Shanxi)) by ordering Wang's transfer. Wang reacted by aligning himself with Li Keyong the military governor of Hedong Circuit (河東, headquartered in modern Taiyuan, Shanxi), and Wang and Li Keyong's troops defeated those of Tian and Tian's allies Li Changfu the military governor of Fengxiang Circuit (鳳翔, headquartered in modern Baoji, Shaanxi) and Zhu Mei the military governor of Jingnan Circuit (靜難, headquartered in modern Xianyang, Shaanxi). Tian again took Emperor Xizong and fled Chang'an, to Xingyuan (興元, in modern Hanzhong, Shaanxi). It was during this flight that Emperor Xizong made Yang Fugong the director of palace communications again, and soon thereafter, when Tian realized that he was open to condemnation from all sides (with his allies Li Changfu and Zhu having abandoned him, and Zhu going as far as supporting Emperor Xizong's distant relative Li Yun the Prince of Xiang as an alternative claimant to the imperial throne), Tian recommended Yang Fugong to succeed him, while making himself the eunuch monitor of Xichuan so that he could join his brother Chen. Subsequently, because of the friendship that Wang had with Yang Fuguang when both were fighting Huang, Yang Fugong was able to persuade Wang and Li Keyong to resubmit to Emperor Xizong.

Meanwhile, with Zhu's campaign against Emperor Xizong stalled, Yang issued a declaration to the Guanzhong region (i.e., the greater Chang'an region) that anyone who killed Zhu would be made the military governor of Jingnan. After hearing the declaration, Zhu's officer Wang Xingyu turned against him, launched a surprise attack on Chang'an (where Zhu and Li Yun were), and killed Zhu. Li Yun fled to Hezhong and was killed by Wang Chongrong, and his competing claim was extinguished. Subsequently, on the imperial train's return to Chang'an, Emperor Xizong stopped at Fengxiang, when a ceremonial dispute erupted between Li Changfu and Yang's adopted son Yang Shouli (楊守立). This erupted into open battle between the Fengxiang army and imperial guards. The imperial guard general Li Maozhen was able to defeat Li Changfu and force him to flee; Li Changfu was subsequently killed by his own subordinate Xue Zhichou (薛知籌), and Li Maozhen took Fengxiang. Upon Emperor Xizong's return to Chang'an, for Yang Fugong's contributions, he was created the Duke of Wei.

In spring 888, Emperor Xizong grew seriously ill. It was said that most imperial officials hoped that his brother Li Bao (李保) the Prince of Ji, who was considered capable, would succeed him, but that under Yang Fugong's support, another brother of Emperor Xizong's, Li Jie the Prince of Shou, was created the Crown Prince. When Emperor Xizong died soon thereafter, Li Jie (whose name was then changed to Li Min) took the throne (as Emperor Zhaozong).

== During Emperor Zhaozong's reign ==
Because of Yang Fugong's contributions to Emperor Zhaozong's taking the throne, he tried to exert his influence in policy decisions, gradually drawing Emperor Zhaozong's displeasure. He further offended the emperor by being arrogant, including riding a litter all the way into the palace, and adopting many strong military officers to be his sons. This caused both the chancellor Kong Wei and Emperor Zhaozong to openly accuse him of impropriety, and Yang, while initially responding that he adopted many officers in order to help defend the emperor, was unable to respond when Emperor Zhaozong pointed out that those officers, then, should be adopted into the imperial clan of Li rather than Yang's own clan. (Indeed, Emperor Zhaozong subsequently demanded to have Yang Shouli attend to him, and Yang Fugong had to accede to the emperor's wishes; Emperor Zhaozong then bestowed a new name, Li Shunjie (李順節), on Yang Shouli, and made him a commander of his personal guards.)

Meanwhile, Yang Fugong had a deep enmity with the chancellor Zhang Jun—because he had initially recommended Zhang for imperial service, but Zhang, after Yang Fugong's initial retirement, immediately became a follower of Yang's rival Tian Lingzi. Emperor Zhaozong, because of this enmity between Zhang and Yang Fugong, further trusted Zhang in order to counteract Yang. As of 890, Zhang, who had also been displeased with Li Keyong because Li Keyong had criticized him, persuaded Emperor Zhaozong to declare a general campaign against Li Keyong, supported by Li Keyong's rival warlords Zhu Quanzhong the military governor of Xuanwu Circuit (宣武, headquartered in modern Kaifeng, Henan) and Li Kuangwei the military governor of Lulong Circuit (盧龍, headquartered in modern Beijing) but opposed by Yang. Zhang's campaign, however, was unsuccessful, purportedly partly due to Yang's sabotage. After Li Keyong defeated the imperial forces, he demanded that Zhang and Kong (who agreed with Zhang's proposal) be demoted. The two were exiled.

Yang continued to exert influence over the imperial governance, and many of his adopted sons and nephews became powerful generals, including his adopted sons Yang Shouzhen the military governor of Longjian Circuit (龍劍, headquartered in Mianyang, Sichuan) and Yang Shouzhong the military governor of Wuding Circuit (武定, headquartered in modern Hanzhong), as well as Yang Fuguang's adopted son Yang Shouliang the military governor of Shannan West Circuit (山南西道, headquartered in modern Hanzhong as well (at Xingyuan)). Yang Fugong also developed another enmity, with Emperor Zhaozong's maternal uncle Wang Gui (王瓌). In fall 891, Yang thus recommended Wang to be the military governor of Qiannan Circuit (黔南). (Where Qiannan was is unclear; the modern historian Bo Yang believed that it was a fictional circuit that Yang created for the sole purpose of murdering Wang.) As Wang was heading to his post through Shannan West, Yang had Yang Shouliang send soldiers disguised as bandits to ambush Wang and kill his entire train. Emperor Zhaozong, believing Yang Fugong to be behind the killings, became hateful of Yang. Further, Li Shunjie, now with a direct relationship with the emperor, was informing the emperor of Yang's misdeeds. Emperor Zhaozong thus ordered Yang to be the eunuch monitor to Fengxiang, but Yang refused on account of illness. He thereafter ordered Yang's retirement, and Yang retired to his mansion at Lantian.

As Yang's mansion was close to the Yushan Camp (玉山營), Yang Fuguang's adopted son Yang Shouxin, who commanded the Yushan Camp, visited him frequently, and thus rumors developed that Yang Fugong and Yang Shouxin were plotting treason. Emperor Zhaozong preemptively ordered Li Shunjie and another imperial guard officer, Li Shoujie (李守節), to attack Yang Fugong's mansion. Yang Fugong and Yang Shouxin took their families and fled to Xingyuan. There, he, Yang Shouliang, Yang Shouzhong, Yang Shouzhen, and another adopted son, Yang Shouhou (楊守厚) the prefect of Mian Prefecture (綿州, in modern Mianyang), jointly announced a campaign, ostensibly against Li Shunjie.

The imperial government did not immediately engage the Yangs. However, in spring 892, five nearby military governors—Li Maozhen of Fengxiang, Wang Xingyu of Jingnan, Han Jian of Zhenguo Circuit (鎮國, headquartered in modern Weinan, Shaanxi), Wang Xingyue (王行約, Wang Xingyu's brother) of Kuangguo Circuit (匡國, headquartered in modern Weinan as well), and Li Maozhuang (李茂莊, Li Maozhen's brother) of Tianxiong (天雄, headquartered in modern Tianshui, Gansu)—apparently seeing this as an excellent opportunity to annex the Yangs' territory, submitted a joint petition requesting permission to attack the Yangs and requesting that Li Maozhen be put in command of the operations. Emperor Zhaozong, believing that if Li Maozhen took over the Yangs' territory, he would be even harder to control, ordered mediation, but no one accepted imperial mediation. Subsequently, Emperor Zhaozong felt compelled to agree with Li Maozhen's wishes, and so formally declared Li Maozhen the commander of the operations against the Yangs.

Li Maozhen quickly captured much of the Yangs' territory, and in fall 892, he captured Xingyuan, and put his adopted son Li Jimi (李繼密) in acting command of Shannan West circuit. Yang Fugong, along with Yang Shouliang, Yang Shouxin, Yang Shouzhen, Yang Shouzhong, and another follower, Man Cun (滿存), fled to Lang Prefecture (閬州, in modern Nanchong, Sichuan). In fall 894, Li Maozhen further attacked Lang Prefecture and captured it. Around that time, Yang Shouhou died. Yang Fuguang, Yang Shouliang, and Yang Shouxin fought out of the encirclement and tried to flee toward Hedong. When they went through Zhenguo, however, Han's soldiers captured them. Han executed Yang Fugong and Yang Shouxin, and delivered their heads and Yang Shouliang to Chang'an, where Yang Shouliang was executed as well. Another adopted son, Yang Yanbo (楊彥伯), did make it to Hedong. Apparently due to Yang Yanbo's request, Li Keyong submitted a petition in Yang Fugong's defense, and Yang Yanbo was permitted to bury Yang Fugong properly, and Yang Fugong's titles were subsequently restored posthumously.

== Notes and references ==
- Old Book of Tang, vol. 184.
- New Book of Tang, vol. 208.
- Zizhi Tongjian, vols. 252, 254, 255, 256, 257, 258, 259.
