= Wei Zhaodu =

Tang dynasty chancellor (died 895)

Wei Zhaodu (韋昭度) (died June 4, 895), courtesy name Zhengji (正紀), formally the Duke of Qi (岐公), was an official of the Chinese Tang dynasty, serving as a chancellor during the reigns of Emperor Xizong and Emperor Xizong's brother Emperor Zhaozong. With imperial power dwindling, Wei's fellow chancellor Cui Zhaowei, who associated with the warlords Li Maozhen, Wang Xingyu, and Han Jian, encouraged Li, Wang, and Han to march on the capital Chang'an. Once the three warlords arrived there, they put Wei and fellow chancellor Li Xi to death.

== Background ==
It is not known when Wei Zhaodu was born. He was from Jingzhao Municipality (京兆, i.e., the region of the Tang dynasty capital Chang'an). His family was not known to be prominent, as it had no known connections to the families of other chancellors named Wei, and his grandfather Wei Shou (韋綬) and father Wei Pang (韋逄) were not listed with any offices. Wei Zhaodu passed the imperial examinations in the Jinshi class in 867, during the reign of Emperor Yizong, and thereafter entered governmental service.

== During Emperor Xizong's reign ==
In the middle of the Qianfu era (874-879) of Emperor Yizong's son and successor Emperor Xizong, Wei Zhaodu went through a series of promotions — becoming a supervisory official at one of the ministries at the executive bureau of government (尚書省, Shangshu Sheng), then becoming in charge of drafting edicts and being made Zhongshu Sheren (中書舍人), a mid-level official at the legislative bureau (中書省, Zhongshu Sheng). When Emperor Xizong fled from Chang'an to Chengdu in early 881 due to the attack on Chang'an by the major agrarian rebel Huang Chao, Wei followed Emperor Xizong there, and once they arrived in Chengdu he was made deputy minister of defense (兵部侍郎, Bingbu Shilang) as well as chief imperial scholar (翰林學士承旨, Hanlin Xueshi Chengzhi). In fall 881, he was given the designation Tong Zhongshu Menxia Pingzhangshi (同中書門下平章事), making him a chancellor de facto. It was said that the reason why he was made chancellor was that he was an associate of the powerful eunuch Tian Lingzi, with whom he established a relationship through the Buddhist monk Shiche (釋澈). As a result, in 886, when the warlords Wang Chongrong, Li Keyong, Zhu Mei, and Li Changfu rose against Tian (forcing Emperor Xizong to again flee Chang'an, to Xingyuan (興元, in modern Hanzhong, Shaanxi)) and demanded Tian's death, they also demanded Wei's death, although no subsequent actions were taken against Wei, who remained chancellor. Subsequently, when the imperial guards battled Li Changfu, it was said that one of the reasons why the imperial guard soldiers were inspired was that Wei left his family members in the imperial guard camp to show his faith in their ability to defeat Li Changfu. Subsequently, the imperial guards, commanded by Li Maozhen, was able to defeat Li Changfu, who was then killed by his own subordinate Xue Zhichou (薛知籌). After Li Changfu's defeat, Emperor Xizong gave Wei the honorific title of Taibao (太保, one of the Three Excellencies) and also gave him the greater chancellor designation of Shizhong (侍中, head of the examination bureau (門下省, Menxia Sheng)). Yet later, after Emperor Xizong returned to Chang'an, he made Wei Zhongshu Ling (中書令, the head of the legislative bureau).

== During Emperor Zhaozong's reign ==
Emperor Xizong died shortly after arriving in Chang'an in spring 888, and was succeeded by his younger brother Emperor Zhaozong. During Emperor Zhaozong's period of mourning, Wei Zhaodu served as regent. He was also created the Duke of Qi.

Shortly after, Emperor Zhaozong received petitions from Gu Yanlang the military governor (Jiedushi) of Dongchuan Circuit (東川, headquartered in modern Mianyang, Sichuan) and the former imperial guard general Wang Jian, both of whom were attacking Tian Lingzi's brother Chen Jingxuan the military governor of Xichuan Circuit (西川, headquartered in modern Chengdu). As Emperor Zhaozong resented Tian (who was then no longer at the imperial government and evading punishment by putting himself under his brother's protection), he ordered an edict that Chen return to Chang'an to serve as an imperial guard general, while making Wei the military governor of Xichuan, still carrying the Zhongshu Ling title as an honorary title. When Chen subsequently refused to accept the order, Emperor Zhaozong stripped him of all titles and ordered Wei to oversee the operations against Chen, assisted by Gu, Wang, and Yang Shouliang the military governor of Shannan West Circuit (山南西道, headquartered in modern Hanzhong). Wei subsequently put Chengdu under siege.

However, by 891, even though Chengdu was in desperate straits, with serious famine inside the city, Wei was still unable to capture the city. With the imperial government having just been crushed in a failed attempt to defeat Li Keyong, it was running out of resources in the campaign against Chen. In spring 891, therefore, Emperor Zhaozong ordered that Chen's titles be restored, and that Gu and Wang return to their own circuits (Wang's having been made the military governor of Yongping Circuit (永平, headquartered in modern Chengdu as well). Wang, however, did not want to give up the campaign against Chen, and initially tried to persuade Wei to maintain the campaign. However, Wang then decided to intimidate Wei into returning to Chang'an so that he could take over the campaign against Chen himself. He thus provoked Gu's officers into killing Wei's subordinate Luo Bao (駱保) under accusations that Luo was corrupt, to intimidate Wei. Wei, in fear, claimed to be ill and transferred his command to Wang, returning to Chang'an by himself. Upon his return to Chang'an, he was made the defender of the eastern capital Luoyang, no longer chancellor. (Wang was subsequently able to force Chen to surrender and seize Xichuan to be his own domain.)

In 893, after the imperial government had been defeated in an attempt to defeat Li Maozhen (who had been made the military governor of Fengxiang Circuit (鳳翔, headquartered in modern Baoji, Shaanxi) but then was no longer following imperial orders and finding ways to intimidate the imperial government) and Li Maozhen's ally Wang Xingyu the military governor of Jingnan Circuit (靜難, headquartered in modern Xianyang, Shaanxi), Emperor Zhaozong was forced to order the chancellor Du Rangneng, who had overseen the operations, to commit suicide. He then recalled Wei to the imperial government to serve as Situ (司徒, one of the Three Excellencies), Menxia Shilang (門下侍郎, the deputy head of the examination bureau), and chancellor again, with the designation Tong Zhongshu Menxia Pingzhangshi. Later that year, when Wang Xingyu demanded to be given the title Shangshu Ling (尚書令), Wei secretly opposed, pointing out that it was a title that no one had held since the great early Tang emperor Emperor Taizong did so during the reign of his father Emperor Gaozu — and that not even the great general Guo Ziyi had dared to accept the title. At Wei's suggestion, Emperor Zhaozong bestowed the title of Shangfu (尚父, "imperial father"), which Guo did hold late in his career, on Wang, as well as bestowing an iron certificate (鐵券), which was supposed to guarantee that he would never be put to death, to try to placate him.

However, Wang was not placated, particularly because Wei's chancellor colleague Cui Zhaowei was secretly associating with Li Maozhen and Wang, and informing, through his cousin Cui Ting (崔鋌), who was Wang's deputy military governor, that it was Wei who opposed his commission as Shangshu Ling. In spring 895, Wang and Li Maozhen thus submitted petitions accusing Wei of being incompetent and accusing another chancellor that Cui also resented, Li Xi, of being wicked. Emperor Zhaozong was forced to remove Li Xi, but not even that placated Wang and Li Maozhen. In fear, Wei requested retirement, and was allowed to retire as Taifu (太傅, the emperor's teacher). Nevertheless, in summer 895, Li Maozhen and Wang, along with their colleague Han Jian, marched on Chang'an and demanded Wei's and Li Xi's deaths. Emperor Zhaozong, even under duress, initially would not approve, but Wang nevertheless seized Wei and Li Xi and executed them. After Li Keyong defeated Wang later in the year, and Wang was killed in flight, Emperor Zhaozong ordered Wei's titles restored, that he be properly buried, and that he be given posthumous honors.

== Notes and references ==
- Old Book of Tang, vol. 179.
- New Book of Tang, vol. 185.
- Zizhi Tongjian, vols. 254, 256, 257, 258, 259, 260.
