= 905 =

Calendar year

905 in various calendars
- Gregorian calendar: 905; CMV
- Ab urbe condita: 1658
- Armenian calendar: 354; ԹՎ ՅԾԴ
- Assyrian calendar: 5655
- Balinese saka calendar: 826–827
- Bengali calendar: 311–312
- Berber calendar: 1855
- Buddhist calendar: 1449
- Burmese calendar: 267
- Byzantine calendar: 6413–6414
- Chinese calendar: 甲子年 (Wood Rat); 3602 or 3395 — to — 乙丑年 (Wood Ox); 3603 or 3396
- Coptic calendar: 621–622
- Discordian calendar: 2071
- Ethiopian calendar: 897–898
- Hebrew calendar: 4665–4666
- Hindu calendars
- Vikram Samvat: 961–962
- Shaka Samvat: 826–827
- Kali Yuga: 4005–4006
- Holocene calendar: 10905
- Iranian calendar: 283–284
- Islamic calendar: 292–293
- Japanese calendar: Engi 5 (延喜５年)
- Javanese calendar: 804–805
- Julian calendar: 905; CMV
- Korean calendar: 3238
- Minguo calendar: 1007 before ROC 民前1007年
- Nanakshahi calendar: −563
- Seleucid era: 1216/1217 AG
- Thai solar calendar: 1447–1448
- Tibetan calendar: ཤིང་ཕོ་བྱི་བ་ལོ་ (male Wood-Rat); 1031 or 650 or −122 — to — ཤིང་མོ་གླང་ལོ་ (female Wood-Ox); 1032 or 651 or −121

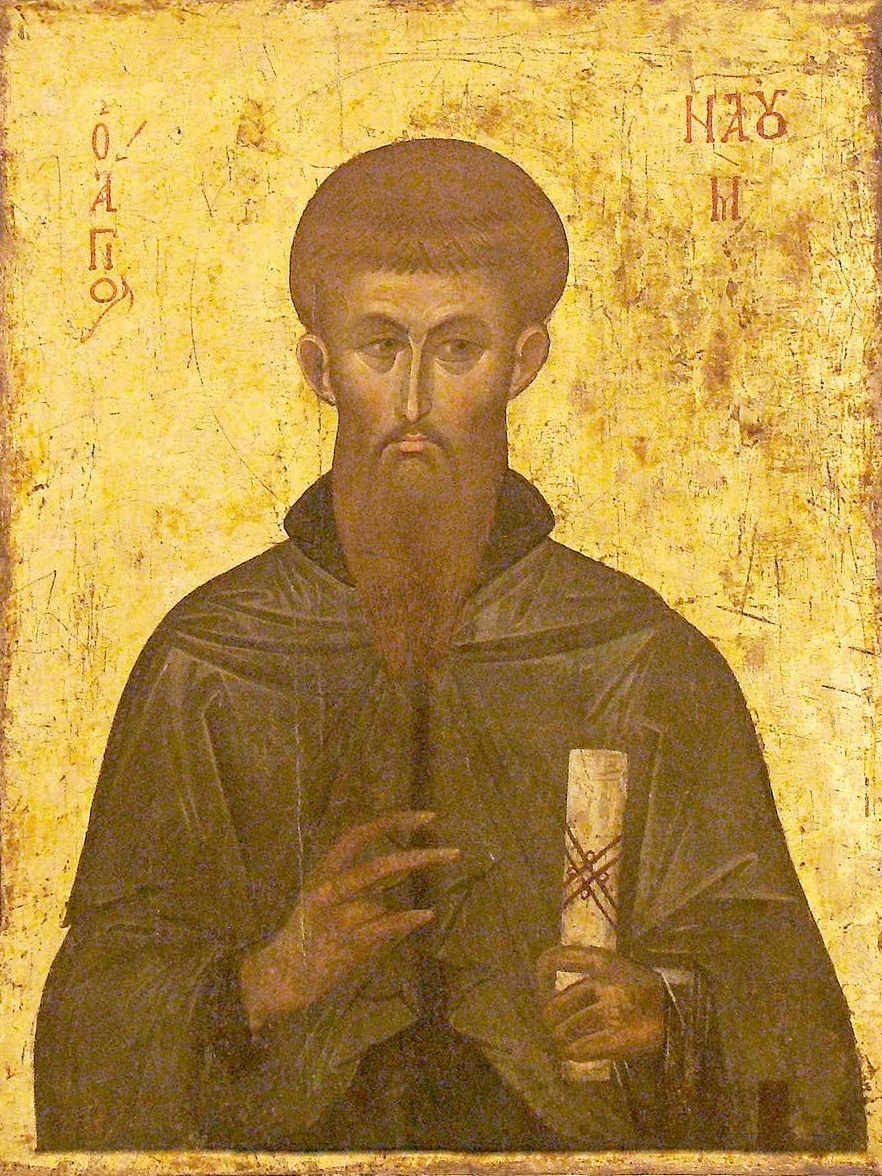
Icon of Naum of Preslav

Year 905 (CMV) was a common year starting on Tuesday of the Julian calendar.

== Events ==
=== By place ===
==== Europe ====
- Spring – King Berengar I of Italy arranges a truce with the Hungarians, on payment of a tribute. Grand Prince Árpád withdraws from Italy, and begins raiding in Bavaria.
- Louis III, Holy Roman Emperor, launches another attempt to invade Italy. A Frankish expeditionary force, led by Adalbert I of Ivrea, captures Pavia, and Berengar I retires to Verona.
- July 21 – Berengar I and a hired Hungarian army defeat the Frankish force at Verona. They take Louis III as prisoner and Berengar blinds him for breaking his oath.
- Louis III returns to Provence. Unable to govern properly, he relinquishes the government of Lower Burgundy to his cousin Hugh, Count of Arles.
- Sancho I succeeds Fortún I as King of Pamplona, and creates a Basque kingdom centered in Navarre (modern-day Spain).

==== Britain ====
- Cadell ap Rhodri, king of Seisyllwg (Wales), makes his 25-year-old son Hywel ap Cadell ruler of Dyfed, having conquered that territory. Rhodri ap Hyfaidd, nominally king of Dyfed, is caught and executed, at Arwystli.
- Norse settlers under the Viking warlord Ingimundr, revolt against the Mercians and try to capture the city of Chester. They are beaten off.

==== Arabian Empire ====
- Summer – Caliph Al-Muktafi sends an Abbasid army (10,000 men) led by Muhammad ibn Sulayman to re-establish control over Syria and Egypt. The campaign is supported from the sea by a fleet from the frontier districts of Cilicia under Damian of Tarsus. He leads his ships up the Nile River, raids the coast, and intercepts the supplies for the Tulunids.
- Ahmad ibn Kayghalagh, an Abbasid military officer, is appointed governor of the provinces of Damascus and Jordan. He is sent to confront a pro-Tulunid rebellion in Egypt under Egyptian general Muhammad ibn Ali al-Khalanji. The latter manages to capture Fustat and proclaims the restoration of the Tulunids, while the local Abbasid commander withdraws to Alexandria.

==== Asia ====
- China loses control over Annam (Northern Vietnam). The village notable Khuc Thua Du leads a rebellion against the Tang Dynasty. The Chinese garrison at Tong Binh (modern Hanoi) is destroyed. Khuc Thua Du declares Annam autonomous.
- Abaoji, a Khitan tribal leader, leads 70,000 cavalry into Shanxi (Northern China) to create a 'brotherhood' with Li Keyong, a Shatuo governor (jiedushi) of the Tang Dynasty.
- Emperor Daigo of Japan orders the selection of four court poets, led by Ki no Tsurayuki, to compile the Kokin Wakashū, an early anthology of Waka poetry.

=== By topic ===
==== Religion ====
- Naum of Preslav, a Bulgarian missionary, founds a monastery on the shores of Lake Ohrid (modern-day North Macedonia), which later receives his name.

== Births ==
- Abu al-Misk Kafur, Muslim vizier (d. 968)
- Al-Mustakfi, Abbasid caliph (d. 949)
- Constantine VII, Byzantine emperor (d. 959)
- Fulk II, Frankish nobleman (approximate date)
- Godfrey, Frankish nobleman (approximate date)

== Deaths ==
- March 17 – Li Yu, Prince of De, prince of the Tang Dynasty
- July 5
  - Cui Yuan, Chinese chancellor
  - Dugu Sun, Chinese chancellor
  - Lu Yi, Chinese chancellor (b. 847)
  - Pei Shu, Chinese chancellor (b. 841)
  - Wang Pu, Chinese chancellor
- Du Hong, Chinese warlord
- Gai Yu, Chinese warlord
- Pei Zhi, Chinese chancellor
- Tribhuvana Mahadevi III, Indian Queen Regnant
- Rhodri ap Hyfaidd, king of Dyfed
- Yahya ibn al-Qasim, Idrisid emir of Morocco
- Yang Xingmi, Chinese governor (b. 852)
