= Wang Pu (Tang dynasty) =

Wang Pu (王溥) (died July 5, 905), courtesy name Derun (德潤), was an official of the Chinese dynasty Tang dynasty, serving as a chancellor from 901 to 903, during the reign of Emperor Zhaozong. He was killed in a purge of high-level Tang officials by the warlord Zhu Quanzhong the military governor (Jiedushi) of Xuanwu Circuit (宣武, headquartered in modern Kaifeng, Henan), who was then preparing to seize the throne.

== Background ==
It is not known when Wang Pu was born. His family was part of the Wang clan of Taiyuan and claimed original ancestry from King Ling of Zhou. Wang Pu's traceable ancestry included officials of Han dynasty, Cao Wei, Jin dynasty (266–420), Northern Wei, Northern Qi, Sui dynasty, and Tang dynasty. Wang Pu's grandfather Wang Kan (王堪) was a county magistrate, but his father Wang Cong (王聰) was not listed with any offices. His biography in the New Book of Tang indicated that his own geographic origin had been lost to history.

== Early career ==
After Wang Pu passed the imperial examinations in the Jinshi (進士) class, he entered governmental service and eventually became Libu Yuanwailang (禮部員外郎), a low-level official at the ministry of rites (禮部, Libu), as well as an editor of the imperial histories. In 896, when the chancellor Cui Yin was commissioned as the military governor (Jiedushi) of Wu'an Circuit (武安, headquartered in modern Changsha), Henan, Cui invited Wang to serve on his staff as his secretary in his role as governor (觀察使, Guanchashi). After Cui's commission was cancelled shortly after and he was allowed to remain as chancellor due to the intercession of his ally Zhu Quanzhong the military governor of Wuanwu Circuit, Wang also remained at the imperial government, becoming a scholar at Jianxian Hall (集賢殿). Thereafter, at the request of Zhao Guangfeng the deputy chief imperial censor, Wang was made Xingbu Langzhong (刑部郎中), a supervisory official at the ministry of justice (刑部, Xingbu), but was also put in charge of the general affairs of the office of censors (御史臺, Yushi Tai).

When Emperor Zhaozong was deposed by a group of powerful eunuchs — Liu Jishu and Wang Zhongxian (王仲先) the commanders of the Shence Armies and the directors of palace communications Wang Yanfan (王彥範) and Xue Qiwo (薛齊偓) — in late 900, in favor of his son Li Yu, Prince of De the Crown Prince, Cui persuaded a group of Shence Army officers to carry out a countercoup in spring 901 to restore Emperor Zhaozong. Wang Pu was involved in Cui's persuasion of the Shence Army officers as well, and soon thereafter was made an imperial scholar (翰林學士, Hanlin Xueshi) and deputy minister of census (戶部侍郎, Hubu Shilang).

== Chancellorship ==
Shortly after Wang Pu's commission as imperial scholar and deputy minister of census, he was further made Zhongshu Shilang (中書侍郎), the deputy head of the legislative bureau of government (中書省, Zhongshu Sheng), and a chancellor, with the designation of Tong Zhongshu Menxia Pingzhangshi (同中書門下平章事), apparently at Cui Yin's recommendation. He was also made the director of taxation (判戶部, Pan Hubu). It was said that there was not much that he could do to improve the imperial governance, however.

In late 901, believing that Emperor Zhaozong and Cui were planning a general slaughter of the eunuchs, the eunuchs, now led by Han Quanhui, seized control of Emperor Zhaozong and took him to Fengxiang Circuit (鳳翔, headquartered in modern Baoji, Shaanxi), then ruled by the eunuchs' ally Li Maozhen. Most imperial officials, led by Cui, stayed at the imperial capital Chang'an, and subsequently, as Zhu Quanzhong, whom Cui had summoned to try to combat the eunuchs, was approaching Chang'an, Cui sent Wang to Chishui (赤水, in modern Weinan, Shaanxi), to rendezvous with Zhu and to discuss the next step in the campaign.

== Removal and death ==
By 903, Zhu Quanzhong had defeated Li Maozhen and forced Li Maozhen to surrender Emperor Zhaozong to sue for peace, and Emperor Zhaozong returned to Chang'an. By this point, Cui Yin had become the most powerful official at the imperial court. It was said that it was Cui's instigation that, shortly after the emperor's return to Chang'an, that Wang Pu was demoted to by Taizi Binke (太子賓客) — an advisor to the Crown Prince, but a completely honorary position at that time since there was no crown prince (Li Yu's having been removed from that title after the 901 countercoup) — and sent out of Chang'an to have his office at the eastern capital Luoyang. (Also at Cui's instigation, two chancellors that Emperor Zhaozong had commissioned at Fengxiang, while under Li Maozhen's and the eunuchs' control, Su Jian and Lu Guangqi, were forced to commit suicide.)

Wang was later recalled to the imperial government to serve as the minister of worship (太常卿, Taichang Qing) and minister of public works (工部尚書, Gongbu Shangshu). After Zhu, who was then intent on seizing the throne, assassinated Emperor Zhaozong in 904 and replaced him with his son Emperor Ai, in 905, Zhu, at the advice of his close associates Liu Can and Li Zhen, began demoting and killing Tang aristocrats en masse. Wang was first demoted to be the census officer at Zi Prefecture (淄州, in modern Zibo, Shandong), and then ordered to commit suicide at Baima Station (白馬驛, in modern Anyang, Henan), with fellow former chancellors Pei Shu, Dugu Sun, Cui Yuan, Lu Yi, as well as the officials Zhao Chong (趙崇) and Wang Zan (王贊). At Li Zhen's request (as Li Zhen, who was unable to pass the imperial examinations, resented these traditional aristocrats for claiming to be free from taint), Zhu had their bodies thrown into the Yellow River (as Li Zhen put it, to taint them).

== Notes and references ==
- New Book of Tang, vol. 182.
- Zizhi Tongjian, vols. 262, 264, 265.
