= Pei Zhi =

Pei Zhi (裴贄) (died 905), courtesy name Jingchen (敬臣), was an official of the Chinese Tang dynasty, serving as a chancellor from 900 to 903 during the reign of Emperor Zhaozong. In 905, as the warlord Zhu Quanzhong the military governor of Xuanwu Circuit (宣武, headquartered in modern Kaifeng, Henan) prepared to seize the throne, Zhu carried out a major purge of high-level Tang officials. Pei, while not targeted in the first wave of the purge, was eventually exiled and then ordered to commit suicide.

== Background and early career ==
It is not known when Pei Zhi was born. He was from the Middle Juan Pei of Pei clan of Hedong, which claimed its ancestry ultimately from the mythical emperor Zhuanxu. The traceable parts of Pei Zhi's ancestry included officials of the Han dynasty, Cao Wei, Northern Wei, Northern Zhou, Sui dynasty, and Tang dynasty. His grandfather Pei Ji (裴稷) was a prefectural prefect, while his father Pei Chu (裴儲) was a secretary general of the supreme court. One of Pei Ji's nephews, Pei Tan, was a chancellor during the reign of Emperor Xizong.

At some point, Pei Zhi passed the imperial examinations in the Jinshi (進士) class. He thereafter successively served as You Bujue (右補闕), a low-level advisory official at the legislative bureau of government (中書省, Zhongshu Sheng); deputy chief imperial censor (御史中丞, Yushi Zhongcheng); and minister of justice (刑部尚書, Xingbu Shangshu).

== Chancellorship ==
In 900, by which time Emperor Xizong's brother Emperor Zhaozong was emperor, Pei Zhi was made Zhongshu Shilang (中書侍郎), the deputy head of the legislative bureau; he was also made a chancellor with the designation Tong Zhongshu Menxia Pingzhangshi (同中書門下平章事). He was also soon given the additional post of minister of census (戶部尚書, Hubu Shangshu). At one point, Emperor Zhaozong suspected that Pei, despite a stern appearance, was actually sexually immoral, and asked the trusted imperial scholar Han Wo for his opinion. Han pointed out that the reason why rumors of immorality may have developed against Pei was that Pei was friendly to his clan members and allowed many of them to live in his mansion, and that it was those people's associations with other people that caused rumors to taint Pei — and, in stating so, Han also referred to Pei Zhi as a nephew of Pei Tan's, knowing that since Pei Tan served Emperor Zhaozong's and Emperor Xizong's father Emperor Yizong, Emperor Zhaozong would be touched by that reference. Emperor Zhaozong thereafter took no action against Pei Zhi. In 901, when Emperor Zhaozong was forcibly seized by the powerful eunuchs led by Han Quanhui and taken to Fengxiang Circuit (鳳翔, headquartered in modern Baoji, Shaanxi), then ruled by the eunuchs' ally, the warlord Li Maozhen, Emperor Zhaozong commissioned Pei as the defender of Daming Palace (大明宮).

== Removal and death ==
In 903, by which time another warlord, Zhu Quanzhong the military governor (Jiedushi) of Xuanwu Circuit (宣武, headquartered in modern Kaifeng, Henan) had defeated Li Maozhen and forced Li to slaughter the eunuchs and deliver the emperor to him, Emperor Zhaozong was returned to Chang'an. Thereafter, Pei Zhi was removed from his chancellor post in favor of Dugu Sun, and was instead made Zuo Pushe (左僕射), one of the heads of the executive bureau (尚書省, Shangshu Sheng). He was then allowed to retire with the honorific title of Sikong (司空, one of the Three Excellencies).

In 905, by which time Zhu, in preparing of seizing the throne, had assassinated Emperor Zhaozong and replaced him with his son Emperor Ai, Zhu's associates Liu Can and Li Zhen persuaded Zhu to carry out a major purge of high-level Tang officials from aristocratic families. Pei was not targeted in the first wave, which claimed the lives of former chancellors Pei Shu, Dugu, Cui Yuan, and Lu Yi, among others. However, soon thereafter, he was exiled to be the census officer at Qing Prefecture (青州, in modern Weifang, Shandong), and then ordered to commit suicide.

== Notes and references ==
- New Book of Tang, vol. 182.
- Zizhi Tongjian, vols. 262, 264, 265.
