= Empress He (Tang dynasty) =

Empress of China (898–900, 901–904)

Empress He 何皇后

Empress Dowager of the Tang dynasty
- Reign: 904 - 22 January 906
- Predecessor: Empress Dowager Zheng
- Successor: None

Empress of the Tang dynasty
- First Reign: 898 - December 4, 900
- Predecessor: Empress Zhaode
- Successor: Herself (Note: As she was restored to the throne)
- Second Reign: January 24, 901 - September 22, 904
- Predecessor: Herself (Note: As she was forcibly made retired empress)
- Successor: None

Retired Empress of the Tang dynasty
- Reign: December 4, 900 - January 24, 901
- Predecessor: Empress Zhuangxian
- Successor: None

Concubine of the Prince of Shou
- Reign: Unknown - 888
- Born: Unknown; Zi Prefecture (modern Mianyang, Sichuan)
- Died: 22 January 906; Luoyang, Tang China
- Cause of death: Strangulation
- Spouse: Emperor Zhaozong of Tang (m. unknown - 904)
- Issue: Li Yu, Prince of De; Princess Pingyuan; Li Zhu, Emperor Ai of Tang
Posthumous name
- Empress Xuanmu (宣穆皇后)
- Clan: He (何) (by birth); Li (李) (by marriage)

Empress He (Chinese: 何皇后; died 22 January 906), formally Empress Xuanmu (宣穆皇后) as honored by Later Tang, semi-formally known as Empress Jishan (積善皇后) (after the palace she resided in, Jishan Palace), was the wife of Emperor Zhaozong near the end of the Tang dynasty of China, and the mother of two of his sons, Li Yu, Prince of De, and Emperor Ai. Her husband, herself, and her sons would all die at the hands of the warlord Zhu Quanzhong, who would eventually take over the Tang throne and establish his own Later Liang.

== Background ==
It was not known when the future Empress He was born. She was from Zi Prefecture (梓州, in modern Mianyang, Sichuan), and her family was not prominent. She became a consort of Li Jie's while he was the Prince of Shou. It was said that she was beautiful and wise, and therefore was favored by Li Jie.

After Li Jie (who then changed his name to Li Min, and then to Li Ye) became emperor (as Emperor Zhaozong) in 888 after the death of his brother Emperor Xizong, he created Consort He an imperial consort with the rank of Shufei (淑妃), the second highest rank for imperial consorts below empress. She was the mother of his oldest son Li You (who was created the Prince of De) and ninth son Li Zuo (who was created the Prince of Hui). (Li You's birth date is unknown, while Li Zuo was born in 892.)

In 897, while Emperor Zhaozong was at Hua Prefecture (華州, in modern Weinan, Shaanxi) after having fled the imperial capital Chang'an in 896 in response to an attack by the warlord Li Maozhen the military governor (Jiedushi) of Fengxiang Circuit (鳳翔, headquartered in modern Baoji, Shaanxi), he created Li You Crown Prince (and changed Li You's name to Li Yu), and then created Consort He empress. (She was the first living empress in a century since Emperor Zhaozong's great-great-great-grandmother Empress Wang, the wife of Emperor Dezong, was briefly empress for three days before her death in 786, even though there had been emperors' mothers who were honored empresses dowager while they were alive after their sons became emperors and/or been honored empresses posthumously.)

== As empress consort ==
Emperor Zhaozong returned to Chang'an in 898 after making peace with Li Maozhen. In 900, Emperor Zhaozong, after getting drunk, killed several eunuchs. This incident led to immediate violent reaction by the powerful eunuch Liu Jishu, one of the two commanders of the eunuch-controlled Shence Armies, who took the Shence Army soldiers into the palace to force the emperor to abdicate and pass the throne to Li Yu. Emperor Zhaozong initially tried to resist, but Empress He, sensing the severity of the situation, convinced him to submit. Liu proclaimed Li Yu emperor (and changed his name to Li Zhen); Emperor Zhaozong and Empress He were given the titles of retired emperor (Taishang Huang) and retired empress (Taishang Huanghou), respectively. Both Emperor Zhaozong and Empress He, and most of their household, were put under house arrest at Shaoyang Pavilion (少陽院). Less than two months later, when a group of Shence Army officers loyal to Emperor Zhaozong, led by Sun Dezhao (孫德昭), Dong Yanbi (董彥弼), and Zhou Chenghui (周承誨), killed Liu and his fellow Shence Army commander Wang Zhongxian (王仲先), it was on Empress He's advice that Emperor Zhaozong first verified that Liu and Wang were dead before exiting Shaoyang Pavilion to resume the throne. He changed Li Zhen's name back to Li Yu but removed the title of Crown Prince from him, making him again the Prince of De.

Emperor Zhaozong, however, subsequently resisted advice from the Tang dynasty chancellor, Cui Yin to wrest control of the Shence Armies from the eunuchs and put them under the command of the chancellors; instead, he commissioned the eunuchs Han Quanhui and Zhang Yanhong (張彥弘) as the new commanders of the Shence Armies. This eventually led to the deepening of the enmity between Cui and the eunuchs. The chief eunuchs entered into an alliance with Li Maozhen, while Cui entered into an alliance with Zhu Quanzhong the military governor of Xuanwu Circuit (宣武, headquartered in modern Kaifeng, Henan). When Cui summoned Zhu to Chang'an to try to use Zhu to wrest control of the Shence Armies from the eunuchs, the eunuchs kidnapped Emperor Zhaozong and Empress He, taking them to Fengxiang Circuit's capital Fengxiang Municipality.

Zhu subsequently attacked Fengxiang Municipality and put it under siege. By 903, Fengxiang was out of food and under dire straits. Li Maozhen sued for peace with Zhu, agreeing to give him the emperor. However, to try to maintain a relationship with Emperor Zhaozong, before he released the emperor, he requested that Emperor Zhaozong marry Empress He's daughter Princess Pingyuan to his son Song Kan (李繼侃), and have Li Mi (李秘), the Prince of Jing, marry the daughter of the chancellor Su Jian, to whom Li Maozhen was aligned. Emperor Zhaozong, eager to be out of Li Maozhen's grasp, agreed to both marriage proposals despite Empress He's misgivings. Li Maozhen subsequently transferred the emperor and his household to Zhu, who took them back to Chang'an. (Subsequently, at Emperor Zhaozong's request, Zhu wrote Li Maozhen, demanding that he return Princess Pingyuan; Li Maozhen, whose military strength was greatly weakened, did not dare to resist, and returned Princess Pingyuan to the emperor.)

Cui subsequently realized that Zhu was leaving soldiers at Chang'an to control the emperor, and he feared the consequences. With the Shence Armies having been disbanded, he tried to reorganize the imperial army to resist Zhu. Zhu, in response, forced Emperor Zhaozong to order Cui's removal; he then put Cui to death. He then, believing that Li Maozhen and Li Maozhen's adoptive son Li Jihui the military governor of Jingnan Circuit (靜難, headquartered in modern Xianyang, Shaanxi) might again attack Chang'an and seize control of the emperor, decided to destroy the city himself and forcibly move the capital to Luoyang, which was firmly under his control. Emperor Zhaozong was forced to agree. However, during the journey to Luoyang, Emperor Zhaozong tried to slow down the trip with the reason that Empress He had just given birth and could not travel fast — so that he could try to send out secret emissaries to other major warlords Wang Jian the military governor of Xichuan Circuit (西川, headquartered in modern Chengdu, Sichuan), Li Keyong the military governor of Hedong Circuit (河東, headquartered in modern Taiyuan, Shanxi), and Yang Xingmi the military governor of Huainan Circuit (淮南, headquartered in modern Yangzhou, Jiangsu) — to no avail, as Zhu forced him to progress quicker to Luoyang. (Empress He probably had a daughter at this time, as Li Yu and Li Zuo were the only sons that she was recorded to have.)

Meanwhile, after the imperial household's arrival in Luoyang, Zhu, despite his having the imperial household under secure control, was disliking the fact that Li Yu was growing up and appearing handsome, worrying that he would become a focus of resistance. (Before Cui's death, he had suggested to Cui that Li Yu, as having improperly taken the throne earlier (albeit under duress) should be put to death; Cui relayed his proposal to Emperor Zhaozong, and when Emperor Zhaozong, who was shocked by the proposal, questioned Zhu, Zhu disavowed having suggested that to Cui.) Emperor Zhaozong and Empress He, under the stress of not knowing what Zhu would do next, spent their days drinking and weeping. After Zhu made his staff member Jiang Xuanhui (蔣玄暉) the director of palace communications in order to have the emperor under his surveillance, Emperor Zhaozong in fact stated to Jiang, on one occasion, "The Prince of De is a beloved son of ours. Why does Quanzhong firmly want him dead?" When Jiang relayed these remarks to Zhu, Zhu became more apprehensive of the emperor, as well as the fact that at this time, the warlords who were resisting him (including Li Maozhen, Li Jihui, Li Keyong, Wang Jian, Yang, Zhao Kuangning the military governor of Zhongyi Circuit (忠義, headquartered in modern Xiangyang, Hubei), and Liu Rengong the military governor of Lulong Circuit (盧龍, headquartered in modern Beijing)) were all ostensibly claiming that they wanted to restore the emperor's powers and return him to Chang'an. With Emperor Zhaozong being an adult and difficult to control, Zhu decided to get rid of the emperor and replace him with someone younger. In the autumn of 904, he sent his adoptive son Zhu Yougong (朱友恭) and the officer Shi Shucong (氏叔琮) with soldiers to the palace. They killed Emperor Zhaozong and the imperial consorts Pei Zhenyi (裴貞一) and Li Jianrong (李漸榮); Empress He was spared only after she begged for her life from Jiang. Zhu declared Li Zuo Crown Prince, and then emperor (as Emperor Ai, with his name changed to Li Zhu). Empress He was honored with the title of empress dowager.

== As empress dowager ==
Shortly after Emperor Zhaozong's death, Zhu Quanzhong also had Jiang Xuanhui invite Li Yu, as well as eight other sons of Emperor Zhaozong's, to a feast. At the feast, under Zhu's orders, Jiang had the nine princes killed by strangulation.

Zhu was soon planning to take over the throne himself, and he had Jiang and the chancellor Liu Can plan the transition. Jiang advocated slowing down the process to try to get the people of the empire to gradually accept the coming transition from Tang to a new dynasty, and this displeased Zhu. Meanwhile, Empress Dowager He was having her ladies in waiting Aqiu (阿秋) and Aqian (阿虔) passing messages between her and Jiang, begging him to have her life and that of the young emperor spared when the transition would occur. This led to Wang Yin (王殷) and Zhao Yinheng falsely accusing Jiang being in a conspiracy with the empress dowager to restore Tang imperial power. In late 905, Zhu had Jiang and Liu put to death and replaced Jiang with Wang and Zhao. Wang and Zhao then accused Empress Dowager He of having carried on an affair with Jiang. Zhu secretly ordered them put the empress dowager to death by strangulation, with Aqiu and Aqian beaten to death, and had Emperor Ai issue an edict claiming that she was having affair with Jiang and committed suicide to offer apology, posthumously demoting her to commoner status. Besides this, Emperor Ai suspended business for three days to show his mourning for her.

In 933, Emperor Mingzong of Later Tang posthumously restored Empress He as Empress Xuanmu.

== Titles ==
- During the reign of Emperor Yizong of Tang (r. 859–873)
  - Lady He (何氏)
  - Concubine of Prince Shou (寿王侍妾)
- During the reign of Emperor Zhaozong of Tang (r. 888–900)
  - Pure Consort (淑妃, from 888)
  - Empress Consort (皇后, from 898)
- During the reign of Emperor Ai of Tang (r. 904–907)
  - Empress Dowager (皇太后, from 904)
  - Commoner (庶人, from 905)
- During the reign of Emperor Mingzong of Later Tang (r. 926–933)
  - Empress Xuamu (宣穆皇后, from 933)

== Issue ==
As Prince Shou's concubine:

- Li Yu, Prince De (德王 李𥙿; d. 905)
- Princess Pingyuan (平原公主)

As Pure Consort:

- Li Zhu, Emperor Ai of Tang (27 October 892 – 26 March 908)

== Notes ==
Chinese nobility
Preceded by Empress Wang	Empress of Tang dynasty 898–900, 901–904	Succeeded by None (dynasty destroyed)
Preceded by Empress Wang	Empress of China (Beijing/Tianjin/Northern Hebei); 898–900, 901–904	Succeeded by Empress Li and Empress Zhu of Yan
Preceded by Empress Wang	Empress of China (Western/Southern Shaanxi); 898–900, 901–904	Succeeded by Empress Liu of Qi
Preceded by Empress Wang	Empress of China (Sichuan/Chongqing); 898–900, 901–904	Succeeded by Empress Zhou of Former Shu
Preceded by Empress Wang	Empress of China (Jiangsu/Anhui/Jiangxi); 898–900, 901–904	Succeeded by Empress Wang of Wu
Preceded by Empress Wang	Empress of China (Shanxi); 898–900, 901–904	Succeeded by Lady Liu of Jin
Preceded by Empress Wang	Empress of China (Eastern Inner Mongolia); 898–900, 901–904	Succeeded by Empress Shulü Ping of Liao dynasty
Preceded by Empress Wang	Empress of China (Zhejiang); 898–900, 901–904	Succeeded by Lady Wu of Wuyue
Preceded by Empress Wang	Empress of China (most regions); 898–900, 901–904	Succeeded by Empress Zhang of Later Liang; Next Empress of united China: Empress Wang (Taizu)
Preceded by Empress Cao of Qi	Empress of China (Guanzhong region); 898–900, 901–904	Succeeded by Empress Zhang of Later Liang; Next Empress of united China: Empress Wang (Taizu)
