= Li Zhen (Later Liang) =

Li Zhen (李振) (died November 20, 923), courtesy name Xingxu (興緒), was an important official of the Chinese Five Dynasties and Ten Kingdoms period state Later Liang. He was a trusted aide of Later Liang's founding emperor Emperor Taizu (Zhu Quanzhong) before the founding of the Later Liang state, and later served as the director of imperial governance (崇政使, Chongzhengshi) during the reigns of Emperor Taizu's sons and successors Zhu Yougui and Zhu Zhen. After Later Liang was destroyed by its rival Later Tang, Later Tang's Emperor Zhuangzong put Li to death.

== Background ==
It is not known when Li Zhen was born. It is known that he was a great-grandson of the mid-Tang general Li Baozhen, and that his grandfather and father, whose names were lost to history, were both prefectural prefects. Li Zhen had submitted himself for imperial examinations in the Jinshi class several times during Emperor Yizong's Xiantong era (860-874) and Emperor Xizong's Qianfu era (874-879), but was unable to pass, and therefore developed a hatred for those officials who passed the Jinshi examinations. He was eventually able to obtain a commission as a general of the imperial guards, and was later commissioned as the prefect of Tai Prefecture (臺州, in modern Taizhou, Zhejiang). However, when he was reporting to the prefecture, the prefecture had become overrun by agrarian rebels, and he was unable to take office. As he headed back toward the imperial capital Chang'an, he went through Bian Prefecture (汴州, in modern Kaifeng, Henan), the capital of Xuanwu Circuit (宣武). He offered strategical advice to Zhu Quanzhong the military governor of Xuanwu; Zhu was impressed, and therefore kept Li at Xuanwu as an assistant to himself.

== Service under Zhu Quanzhong ==
=== During Tang ===
In 898, after Zhu Quanzhong, who was then military governor of not only Xuanwu but also Xuanyi Circuit (宣義, headquartered in modern Anyang, Henan), had further expanded his territory by conquering Tianping (天平, headquartered in modern Tai'an, Shandong) and Taining (泰寧, headquartered in modern Jining, Shandong) Circuits, he sent his deputy military governor Wei Zhen (韋震) to Chang'an to request that Emperor Zhaozong (Emperor Xizong's brother and successor) make him the military governor of Tianping as well. The imperial government, after initial reservations, did so after much lobbying by Wei. Zhu subsequently made Wei the acting military governor and Li Zhen the deputy military governor.

In 900, the powerful eunuchs, led by Liu Jishu, overthrew Emperor Zhaozong and put him under arrest, replacing him with his son Li Yu, Prince of De. Liu sent his adoptive son Liu Xidu (劉希度) and another eunuch, Li Fengben (李奉本), to Bian Prefecture to try to persuade Zhu to support the eunuchs' coup, promising to let him control the imperial court if he did so. Zhu was unsure what to do, and most of his staff members suggested not getting involved with the politics at the imperial court. Li Zhen, however, urged intervention against the eunuchs, pointing out that this was a good opportunity for Zhu to raise his profile among the regional governors, and further pointing out that if the young emperor became firmly in control of the eunuchs, the eunuchs could easily do what they wanted. Zhu agreed, and put Liu Xidu and Li Fengben under arrest, while sending Li Zhen to Chang'an to personally meet with the anti-eunuch chancellor Cui Yin, who was an ally of Zhu's, to consider what to do next. When, shortly thereafter, a countercoup by several Shence Army officers killed Liu Jishu and his coconspirators and restored Emperor Zhaozong, Zhu, who then executed Liu Xidu and Li Fengben, became even more attentive to Li Zhen's advice.

By 904, Zhu had Emperor Zhaozong in his firm control and had forcibly moved the emperor from Chang'an to Luoyang. However, he was still apprehensive that the emperor might coordinate his actions with several other warlords who did not obey him—Li Maozhen the military governor of Fengxiang Circuit (鳳翔, headquartered in modern Baoji, Shaanxi), Li Jihui the military governor of Jingnan Circuit (靜難, headquartered in modern Xianyang, Shaanxi), Li Keyong the military governor of Hedong Circuit (河東, headquartered in modern Taiyuan, Shanxi), Liu Rengong the military governor of Lulong Circuit (盧龍, headquartered in modern Beijing), Wang Jian the military governor of Xichuan Circuit (西川, headquartered in modern Chengdu, Sichuan), Yang Xingmi the military governor of Huainan Circuit (淮南, headquartered in modern Yangzhou, Jiangsu), and Zhao Kuangning the military governor of Zhongyi Circuit (忠義, headquartered in modern Xiangyang, Hubei). He therefore resolved to assassinate the emperor, and therefore sent Li Zhen to Luoyang to coordinate this matter with Jiang Xuanhui (蔣玄暉) the director of palace communications (whom Zhu had put in charge of monitoring the emperor), as well as his adoptive son Zhu Yougong (朱友恭) and officer Shi Shucong (氏叔琮). Zhu Yougong and Shi subsequently assassinated Emperor Zhaozong, who was then replaced with his son Emperor Ai. While Zhu Quanzhong subsequently ordered Zhu Yougong and Shi to commit suicide in order to divert responsibility, no harm came to Li Zhen or Jiang.

In 905, Zhu made Li Zhen the acting military governor of Pinglu Circuit (平盧, headquartered in modern Weifang, Shandong), to replace Wang Shifan, who had previously launched a resistance campaign against Zhu but who had subsequently submitted to Zhu. When Wang received the order, he feared that Zhu would bear past grudges against him, and begged Li Zhen to have at least his family spared. Li Zhen alleviated Wang's fears by citing the example of how Cao Cao had spared Zhang Xiu, and Wang subsequently went to Bian Prefecture along with his family. Zhu soon recalled Li Zhen himself back to Bian Prefecture.

Later in 905, as Zhu was planning on seizing the throne soon, Zhu's ally, the chancellor Liu Can, advocated a mass purge of high-level Tang aristocrats, a proposal that Li Zhen also supported, as Li Zhen still hated these aristocrats, whose careers were largely launched from passing the Jinshi examinations. Zhu therefore had a group of some 30 high-level Tang aristocrats gathered at Baima Station (白馬驛, in modern Anyang), and then forced them to commit suicide. The victims included former chancellors Pei Shu, Dugu Sun, Cui Yuan, Lu Yi, Wang Pu, as well as the prominent officials Zhao Chong (趙崇) and Wang Zan (王贊). Further, at Li Zhen's suggestion—arguing that these aristocrats had considered themselves clean in their origin (i.e., qingliu (清流), literally "clear flow"), they should be thrown into the muddy waters of the Yellow River to taint them—Zhu had their bodies thrown into the Yellow River. (During the purge, because Li Zhen was acting arrogantly toward Tang officials at Luoyang, and it was said that every time that he went from Bian Prefecture to Luoyang, some officials would always get exiled or executed, he became known by the nickname of Chixiao (鴟梟)—a mythical one-head, three-bodied bird.)

=== During Later Liang ===
In 907, Zhu Quanzhong had Emperor Ai yield the throne to him, ending Tang dynasty and establishing a new Later Liang as its Emperor Taizu. Li Zhen was thereafter made the director of palace affairs (殿中監, Dianzhong Jian). Shortly after, it was at his and Jing Xiang's suggestion that the Tang official Su Xun (蘇循), who had submitted petitions in support of the dynastic transition, be forced to retire as a traitor to Tang. Li was later made the minister of census (戶部尚書, Hubu Shangshu).

In 911, when Later Liang's Tianxiong Circuit (天雄, headquartered in modern Handan, Hebei) was under attack by Li Cunxu, the prince of Later Liang's enemy state Jin to the north, Emperor Taizu was concerned that Tianxiong's young military governor, Luo Zhouhan (who had inherited the governorship from his father Luo Shaowei), would not have the ability to stand against a Jin attack, and therefore sent the general Du Tingyin (杜廷隱) to assist Luo in the defense and Li Zhen to serve as Luo's deputy military governor. (It did not appear that Li Zhen remained long at Tianxiong, however, based on subsequent events.)

== Service under Zhu Yougui and Zhu Zhen ==
In 912, Emperor Taizu's son Zhu Yougui the Prince of Ying assassinated Emperor Taizu (who was then at Luoyang), blamed the assassination on his adoptive older brother Zhu Youwen the Prince of Bo and had Zhu Youwen executed, and then took the throne himself. Apprehensive about Jing Xiang, who was then the director of imperial governance and whose office was within the palace, as Jing was a close associate of Emperor Taizu's, Zhu Yougui gave Jing what appeared to be a promotion — to chancellorship — to remove him from the director of imperial governance position and remove his presence from the palace. Li Zhen was made the director of imperial governance.

In 913, Zhu Yougui's younger brother Zhu Youzhen the Prince of Jun, who was then at Daliang (i.e., Bian Prefecture), prepared a coup against Zhu Yougui. Before he could launch it, however, his cousin Yuan Xiangxian (a son of Emperor Taiizu's sister), an imperial guard general, launched a coup and had Zhu Yougui's palace surrounded. Zhu Yougui committed suicide. During this coup, many Later Liang officials were killed or injured, and Li was one of the ones injured. Subsequently, Yuan offered the throne to Zhu Youzhen, who accepted it at Daliang, and subsequently changed his name to Zhu Zhen.

While Li continued to serve as the director of imperial governance, neither he nor Jing was listened to much by Zhu Zhen, even though nominally they were the most honored officials of the state. Instead, Zhu Zhen mostly listened to the advice of Zhao Yan, the husband of one of his sisters, as well as his wife Consort Zhang's brothers Zhang Handing (張漢鼎) and Zhang Hanjie (張漢傑) and cousins Zhang Hanlun (張漢倫) and Zhang Hanrong (張漢融). As a result, Li often claimed to be ill to avoid policy meetings and avoid arguments with Zhao and the Zhangs.

In 923, Li Cunxu, whose Jin state by that point controlled nearly all of the territory north of the Yellow River, claimed imperial title as well, establishing a new Later Tang as its Emperor Zhuangzong. The two states were gearing up for a major confrontation on the battlefield, and Zhu Zhen put the general Duan Ning in command of the Later Liang army, against Jing's and Li's advice and against their subsequent requests to replace him. (It was said that Zhu Zhen stated to Li, "Duan Ning has not committed an error," and Li responded, "When he does so, the empire would already be in danger.") As Duan prepared an ambitious four-prong attack against Later Tang, the new Later Tang emperor bypassed him, crossed the Yellow River, and headed toward Daliang directly. With Daliang defenseless (because all the soldiers had been given to Duan in anticipation for the attack against Later Tang), Zhu Zhen panicked and committed suicide, ending Later Liang.

== Death ==
Upon Emperor Zhuangzong's arrival at Daliang, he issued an edict generally pardoning the Later Liang officials. Hearing of the edict, Li Zhen went to see Jing Xiang and suggested that they go see Emperor Zhuangzong together to beg for pardon. Jing responded, "Both of us were Liang chancellors. We could not correct the emperor's poor governance, and we could not save the dynasty from destruction. If the new emperor questions us on these grounds, how are we going to respond?" The next morning, Jing's servants informed him that Li Zhen had already gone to the palace. Jing sighed and stated, "Li Zhen is no man. The Zhus and the new emperor have been enemies for generations. Now, the empire has been destroyed, and the emperor is dead. Even if the new emperor would spare us, how can we still enter the Jianguo Gate [(建國門, the gate to the Later Liang imperial palace)]?" He therefore hanged himself. Within a few days, Emperor Zhuangzong, at the instigation of Duan Ning and another former Later Liang general, Du Yanqiu, issued another edict which, while generally confirming the pardon, ordered that Jing (whose death he apparently did not know), Li, Zhao, the Zhangs, the Later Liang general Zhu Gui (朱珪), and the Khitan prince Yelü Sala'abo (耶律撒剌阿撥) (the brother of the Khitan emperor Emperor Taizu of Liao, who had previously rebelled against the Khitan emperor and fled to Emperor Zhuangzong, and then re-defected to Later Liang) be put to death, along with their families.

== Notes and references ==
- History of the Five Dynasties, vol. 18.
- New History of the Five Dynasties, vol. 43.
- Zizhi Tongjian, vols. 261, 262, 263, 265, 266, 267, 268, 269, 272.
