= Lu Yi (Tang dynasty) =

Lu Yi (陸扆) (847 – July 5, 905), né Lu Yundi (陸允迪), courtesy name Xiangwen (祥文), formally the Duke of Wu Commandery (吳郡公), was an official of the Chinese Tang dynasty, who served as chancellor twice during the reign of Emperor Zhaozong.

== Background ==
Lu Yi was born in 847, during the reign of Emperor Xuānzong; he was originally named Lu Yundi, and it is not known when his name was changed to Lu Yi. His family was originally from the former Wu Commandery (around modern Suzhou, Jiangsu) but had, by Lu Yi's time, relocated to Shan Prefecture (陝州, in modern Sanmenxia, Henan). His family claimed ancestry from the ruling house of Tian of the Warring States period state Qi, but his traceable ancestry only went back to his great-great-grandfather, the Tang dynasty official Lu Qiwang (陸齊望). (Through Lu Qiwang, Lu Yi was related to an earlier chancellor, Lu Zhi, who was a grandson of Lu Qiwang's and who was chancellor during the reign of Emperor Xuānzong's great-grandfather Emperor Dezong.) Lu Yi's grandfather Lu Shide (陸師德) was an imperial censor, while his father Lu Shan (陸墠) was a secretary for a prefectural prefect.

== Early career ==
Lu Yi passed the imperial examinations in the Jinshi (進士) class in 886, during the reign of Emperor Xuānzong's grandson Emperor Xizong, and later in the year was part of Emperor Xuānzong's procession to Xingyuan (興元, in modern Hanzhong, Shaanxi) when Emperor Xuānzong fled there from the imperial capital Chang'an due to a military confrontation between the powerful eunuch Tian Lingzi and Tian's allies Zhu Mei the military governor of Jingnan Circuit (靜難, headquartered in modern Xianyang, Shaanxi) and Li Changfu the military governor of Fengxiang Circuit (鳳翔, headquartered in modern Baoji, Shaanxi) on one side, and the warlords Wang Chongrong the military governor of Huguo Circuit (護國, headquartered in modern Yuncheng, Shanxi) and Li Keyong, the military governor of Hedong Circuit (河東, headquartered in modern Taiyuan, Shanxi) on the other. Later that year, the chancellor Wei Zhaodu, who also served as the director of the salt and iron monopolies, made Lu a surveyor under him. In 887, another chancellor, Kong Wei, made Lu a copyeditor (校書郎, Xiaoshu Lang) for the imperial histories. Soon thereafter, Lu's mother died, and he left governmental service to observe a mourning period for her.

In 889, by which time Emperor Xizong had died and been succeeded by his brother Emperor Zhaozong, Lu was recalled to government service to serve as the sheriff of Lantian County (藍田, in modern Xi'an, Shaanxi), but also to serve as a scholar at Hongwen Pavilion (弘文館). Thereafter, he was made Zuo Shiyi (左拾遺), an advisory official at the examination bureau of government (門下省, Menxia Sheng), as well as a scholar at Jixian Pavilion (集賢院). Soon thereafter, at the request of Liu Pi (柳玭) the deputy chief imperial censor, Lu was made an imperial censor with the title Jiancha Yushi (監察御史). In 891, he was made an imperial scholar (翰林學士, Hanlin Xueshi) as well as Tuntian Yuanwailang (屯田員外郎), a low-level official at the ministry of public works (工部, Gongbu). In 892, he was made Cibu Langzhong (祠部郎中), a supervisory official at the ministry of rites (禮部, Libu) and put in charge of drafting edicts. In 893, he was made Zhongshu Sheren (中書舍人), a mid-level official at the legislative bureau (中書省, Zhongshu Sheng). It was said that Lu thought and wrote quickly, and his writings were both well-written and well-reasoned. On an occasion when Emperor Zhaozong wrote a poem and asked the imperial scholars to write responses, Lu wrote one quickly, impressing Emperor Zhaozong, who compared him to Lu Zhi and Wu Tongxuan (吳通玄), another talented official who served Emperor Dezong.

In 894, Lu Yi was made the deputy minister of census (戶部侍郎, Hubu Shilang). In 895, he was made the deputy minister of defense (兵部侍郎, Bingbu Shilang); he was also given the honorary title of Yinqing Guanglu Daifu (銀青光祿大夫) and created the Baron of Jiaxing. In 896, he was made the chief imperial scholar (翰林學士承旨, Hanlin Xueshi Chengzhi), and soon thereafter Shangshu Zuo Cheng (尚書左丞), one of the secretaries general of the executive bureau (尚書省, Shangshu Sheng).

== First chancellorship ==
Later in 896, Emperor Zhaozong made Lu Yi the deputy minister of census again, and made him a chancellor with the designation Tong Zhongshu Menxia Pingzhangshi (同中書門下平章事). Traditionally, an officials from one of the three bureaus i.e., the executive, the legislative, and the examination (門下省, Menxia Sheng) were elevated to chancellorship, he would give an amount of money to the officials under him to thank them for their service under him, but that tradition did not include the office of the imperial scholars (翰林院, Hanlin Yuan). Lu, in a break with that tradition, gave money to the officials at the office of the imperial scholars to thank them, and they felt honored.

However, Lu did not remain chancellor long on this occasion. His elevation to chancellorship was intended to replace Cui Yin, and was carried out at a time when Emperor Zhaozong and the imperial officials had fled Chang'an and gone to Zhenguo Circuit (鎮國, headquartered in modern Weinan, Shaanxi) to flee an attack that Li Maozhen the military governor of Fengxiang Circuit was carrying out against Chang'an; once they got to Zhenguo, Zhenguo's military governor Han Jian, with the emperor under his physical control, instigated Cui's removal and exile (to be the military governor of Wu'an Circuit (武安, headquartered in modern Changsha, Hunan)). However, soon thereafter, Cui elicited the aid of the powerful warlord Zhu Quanzhong the military governor of Xuanwu Circuit (宣武, headquartered in modern Kaifeng, Henan), and Zhu submitted a petition protesting Cui's removal and further suggesting that Emperor Zhaozong move the capital to the eastern capital Luoyang (i.e., out of Han's reach and in Zhu's territory). Han, in fear, cancelled Cui's removal and had him made chancellor again. Thereafter, Cui, resenting Lu for replacing him, falsely accused Lu of being an ally of Li Maozhen's and had Lu demoted to be the prefect of Xia Prefecture (硤州, in modern Yichang, Hubei). (Both Lu's biographies in the Old Book of Tang and the New Book of Tang blamed Lu's demotion on, according to them, Lu's opposition to the launching of a campaign against Li Maozhen that led to Li Maozhen's attack on Chang'an; however, as Lu's elevation to the chancellorship came after Li Maozhen's attack, that appears to be unlikely.)

== Between chancellorships ==
In summer 897, Lu Yi was recalled to serve as the minister of public works (工部尚書, Gongbu Shangshu). In fall 897, he was made the minister of defense (兵部尚書, Bingbu Shangshu), and soon thereafter he subsequently accompanied Emperor Zhaozong on the emperor's return to Chang'an.

== Second chancellorship ==
In 899, Lu Yi was again made chancellor, replacing Cui Yin. In 900, he was created the Duke of Wu Commandery. He was subsequently made Menxia Shilang (門下侍郎) — deputy head of the examination bureau — and put in charge of editing the imperial histories. Later in 900, Emperor Zhaozong was forced to abdicate in favor of his son and crown prince Li Yu, Prince of De after a coup by a group of powerful eunuchs led by Liu Jishu, but in spring 901, a group of Shence Army officers loyal to Emperor Zhaozong in turn overthrew the eunuchs and restored Emperor Zhaozong to the throne. Soon thereafter, Cui (who was chancellor again by that point) and Lu submitted a joint proposal to have the two Shence Armies, which were traditionally under the command of eunuch commanders, placed under the two chancellors' command instead. However, this proposal was opposed by the Shence Army officers who restored Emperor Zhaozong, as well as Li Maozhen (who was then in a rapprochement stance with the imperial government), and Emperor Zhaozong rejected it, placing the Shence Armies under the commands of the eunuchs Han Quanhui and Zhang Yanhong (張彥弘) instead. Meanwhile, Emperor Zhaozong secretly suspected that Lu did not support his return to the throne, but the imperial scholar Han Wo spoke in Lu's defense, and Emperor Zhaozong took no action against Lu.

Subsequently, Han and Zhang, fearing that Emperor Zhaozong and Cui were going to slaughter the eunuchs, kidnapped Emperor Zhaozong and took him to Fengxiang. Zhu, at Cui's request, put Fengxiang's capital Fengxiang Municipality under siege. In 903, with Fengxiang in desperate straits, Li Maozhen killed Han, Zhang, and their supporters, and turned Emperor Zhaozong over to Zhu to sue for peace. Lu's actions during the Fengxiang siege were not recorded in history. However, after Zhu returned Emperor Zhaozong to Chang'an, Emperor Zhaozong issued an edict to the circuits — but specifically left Fengxiang out of the edict's distribution list. Lu argued that singling Fengxiang out showed a lack of magnanimity. Cui, in anger, suggested to Emperor Zhaozong that Lu be demoted, and Lu thereafter was made the teacher of Emperor Zhaozong's son Li Yan (李禋) the Prince of Yi, but with his office at Luoyang. He was also reduced in his honorary title of Tejin (特進) down to Zhengyi Daifu (正議大夫).

== After second chancellorship ==
In 904, after Zhu Quanzhong killed Cui Yin and forced Emperor Zhaozong to move the capital to Luoyang, Lu Yi was made the minister of civil service affairs (吏部尚書, Libu Shangshu) and restored to the rank of Tejin, but was not again chancellor. He accompanied Emperor Zhaozong on the journey to Luoyang. Later in the year, Zhu had Emperor Zhaozong assassinated and replaced with his son Emperor Ai. In 905, Zhu, at the advice of his close associates Liu Can and Li Zhen, began demoting and killing Tang aristocrats en masse, and Lu was first demoted to be the census officer at Pu Prefecture (濮州, in modern Heze, Shandong), and then ordered to commit suicide at Baima Station (白馬驛, in modern Anyang, Henan), with fellow former chancellors Pei Shu, Dugu Sun, Cui Yuan, Wang Pu, as well as the officials Zhao Chong (趙崇) and Wang Zan (王贊). At Li Zhen's request (as Li Zhen, who was unable to pass the imperial examinations, resented these traditional aristocrats for claiming to be free from taint), Zhu had their bodies thrown into the Yellow River (as Li Zhen put it, to taint them).

== Notes and references ==
- Old Book of Tang, vol. 179.
- New Book of Tang, vol. 183.
- Zizhi Tongjian, vols. 260, 261, 262, 264, 265.
