= Lu Xisheng =

Lu Xisheng (陸希聲) (d. 895) was an official of the Chinese Tang dynasty, who briefly served as chancellor during the reign of Emperor Zhaozong.

== Background ==
It is not known when Lu Xisheng was born. His family claimed ancestry from the ruling house of Tian of the Warring States period state Qi and traced its subsequent ancestry through officials of the Han dynasty, the Jin dynasty (266–420), Liu Song, Southern Qi, the Liang dynasty, the Chen dynasty, and the Tang dynasty. Both Lu Xisheng's 5th-ancestor Lu Yuanfang and Lu Yuanfang's son Lu Xiangxian served as chancellors – Lu Yuanfang under the female sovereign Wu Zetian, who interrupted Tang and established her own state of Zhou, and Lu Xiangxian under Wu Zetian's son Emperor Ruizong of Tang and grandson Emperor Xuanzong. Lu Xisheng was descended from Lu Xiangxian's younger brother Lu Jingrong (陸景融). His grandfather Lu Mengru (陸孟儒) served under a prefectural prefect, and his father Lu Ao (陸翱) was not listed with any official titles.

== Early career ==
It was said that Lu Xisheng was studious and was good at writing. He particularly understood the I Ching, the Spring and Autumn Annals, and the Tao Te Ching well, and wrote many commentaries. At one point, he served on the staff of Zheng Yu (鄭愚) the prefect of Shang Prefecture (商州, in modern Shangluo, Shaanxi), at Zheng's request. After he left his service under Zheng, he became a hermit in Yixing. After a long period of time, he was summoned by the imperial government to serve as You Shiyi (右拾遺), an advisory official at the legislative bureau of government (中書省, Zhongshu Sheng). It was said that at that time the ruling officials were corrupt, and there had been several years of bad harvests, with the situation being particularly severe in the region of Bian (汴州, in modern Kaifeng, Henan) and Song (宋州, in modern Shangqiu, Henan) Prefectures. Lu realized the severity of the situation and submitted petitions that warned that these conditions would be prime for the appearance of agrarian rebels, but apparently his petition drew no reactions. The next year, as he warned, the agrarian rebel Wang Xianzhi started a major rebellion. Lu later served as the prefect of She Prefecture (歙州, in modern Huangshan, Anhui). Emperor Zhaozong heard of his fame and recalled him to the imperial government to serve as imperial attendant (給事中, Jishizhong).

== Chancellorship and after chancellorship ==
In 895, Emperor Zhaozong made Lu Xisheng the deputy minister of census (戶部侍郎, Hubu Shilang) and a chancellor with the designation Tong Zhongshu Menxia Pingzhangshi (同中書門下平章事). However, it was said that Lu did nothing important while being chancellor. He was removed from chancellorship just three months later and made an advisor to the Crown Prince. Later in the year, when Emperor Zhaozong fled the capital Chang'an into the Qinling Mountains due to the attack by the warlords Li Maozhen the military governor of Fengxiang Circuit (鳳翔, headquartered in modern Baoji, Shaanxi) and Wang Xingyu the military governor of Jingnan Circuit (靜難, headquartered in modern Xianyang, Shaanxi), Lu followed despite his being ill at the time. He apparently died during flight, and was subsequently given posthumous honors and the posthumous name of Wen (文, "civil").

== Notes and references ==
- New Book of Tang, vol. 116.
- Zizhi Tongjian, vol. 260.
