= Emperor Zhaozong of Tang =

Emperor of Tang China from 888 to 904

Emperor Zhaozong of Tang 唐昭宗
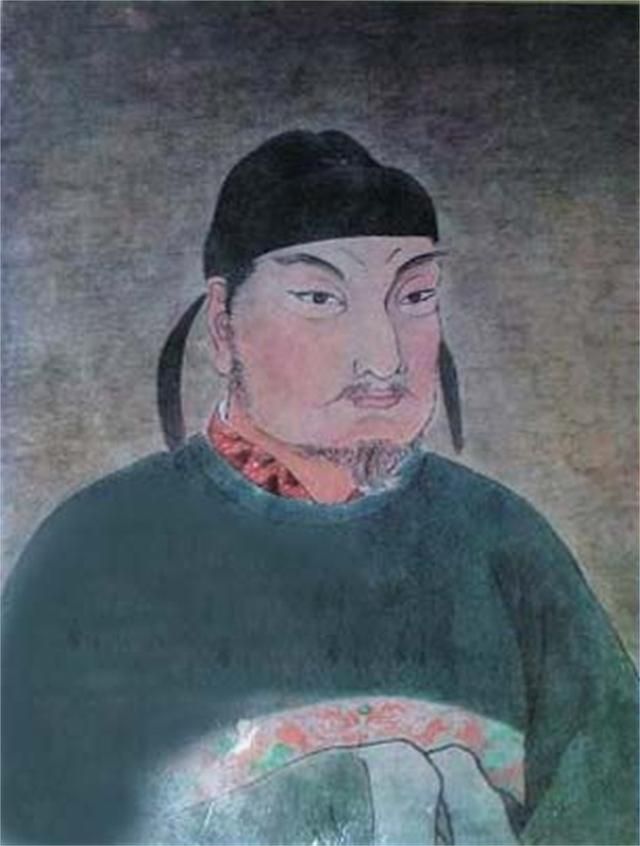

Emperor of the Tang dynasty
- Reign: April 20, 888 – December 1, 900
- Predecessor: Emperor Xizong
- Successor: Emperor Ai
- Reign: January 24, 901 – September 22, 904
- Born: Li Jie; March 31, 867
- Died: September 22, 904 (aged 37)
- Burial: He Mausoleum (和陵)
- Consorts: Empress Xuanmu (m. –904)
Full name
- Family name: Lǐ (李); Given name: Originally Jíe (傑), later Mǐn (敏) (changed 888) later Yè (曄, changed 889)
Era dates
- Lóngjì (龍紀) 889; Dàshùn (大順) 890–891; Jǐngfú (景福) 892–893; Qíanníng (乾寧) 894–898; Guānghùa (光化) 898–901; Tiānfù (天復) 901–904; Tiānyòu (天佑) 904
Posthumous name
- Emperor Shèngmù Jǐngwén Xìao (聖穆景文孝皇帝) (commonly known); Emperor Gōnglíng Zhuāngmǐn Xiào (恭靈莊閔孝皇帝) (used from 905 to ~923)
Temple name
- Zhāozōng (昭宗) (commonly known); Xiāngzōng (襄宗) (used from 905 to ~923)
- House: Li
- Dynasty: Tang
- Father: Emperor Yizong
- Mother: Empress Gongxian

Tang Zhaozong
- Chinese: 唐昭宗
- Literal meaning: "Manifest Ancestor of the Tang"
Transcriptions
Standard Mandarin
- Hanyu Pinyin: Táng Zhāozōng
- Wade–Giles: T'ang Chao-tsung

Li Jie
- Chinese: 李傑
Transcriptions
Standard Mandarin
- Hanyu Pinyin: Lǐ Jíe
- Wade–Giles: Li Chieh

Li Min
- Chinese: 李敏
Transcriptions
Standard Mandarin
- Hanyu Pinyin: Lǐ Mǐn
- Wade–Giles: Li Min

Li Ye
- Chinese: 李曄
Transcriptions
Standard Mandarin
- Hanyu Pinyin: Lǐ Yè
- Wade–Giles: Li Yeh

Emperor Zhaozong of Tang (March 31, 867 – September 22, 904), né Li Jie, name later changed to Li Min and again to Li Ye, was the 22nd and penultimate emperor of China's Tang dynasty. He reigned from 888 to 904 (although he was briefly deposed by the eunuch Liu Jishu in 900 and restored in 901). Emperor Zhaozong was the seventh son of Emperor Yizong and younger brother of Emperor Xizong. Later, Li Jie was murdered by Zhu Wen, who would later become the founding emperor of the Later Liang dynasty.

During Emperor Zhaozong's reign, the Tang dynasty fell into total disarray and rebellions, which had been ongoing since the reign of his older brother, Emperor Xizong, as they erupted throughout the country while the imperial government's authority effectively disappeared. In the midst of all this, Emperor Zhaozong tried to salvage the dying dynasty. However, his efforts to reassert imperial power generally backfired, as his unsuccessful campaigns against Li Keyong, Chen Jingxuan, and Li Maozhen, merely allowed them to re-affirm their power. Eventually, the major warlord Zhu Wen seized control of the imperial government and in 904 had Emperor Zhaozong killed as the prelude of taking over the Tang throne. Zhu also killed many of Emperor Zhaozong's ministers, including the chancellor, Cui Yin. Zhu then placed Zhaozong's 13-year-old son as a puppet emperor (as Emperor Ai). By 907, Zhu himself took over the throne, ending the Tang dynasty and establishing a new Later Liang dynasty. Emperor Zhaozong's reign lasted almost 16 years and he was buried in the He Mausoleum (和陵). He was 37.

== Background ==
Li Jie was born in 867, during the reign of his father Emperor Yizong, in the eastern palace at the imperial capital Chang'an. His mother was Emperor Yizong's concubine Consort Wang, who was said to have come from a humble background and whose rank within the palace was not recorded. She appeared to have died shortly after giving birth to Li Jie. (As Li Jie was also said to have been from the same mother as his older brother Li Yan, whose mother was a different Consort Wang, it might have been that he was raised by Li Yan's mother.)

In 872, Emperor Yizong created Li Jie the Prince of Shou. In 877, by which time Li Yan (named Li Xuan by this point) was emperor (as Emperor Xizong), Li Jie was given the honorary titles of Kaifu Yitong Sansi (開府儀同三司), commandant at You Prefecture (幽州, in modern Beijing), and military governor (Jiedushi) of Lulong Circuit (盧龍, headquartered at Beijing). (At that time, Lulong Circuit was actually governed by the warlord Li Keju.) It was said that Li Jie was particularly close to Emperor Xizong since they shared the same mother, and he followed Emperor Xizong in flight from Chang'an from the attack of the agrarian rebels led by Huang Chao in 880. While on this flight, Li Jie, who was then 13, ran out of energy and requested a horse from the eunuch Tian Lingzi, who dominated Emperor Xizong's court; Tian refused and whipped Li Jie's attendant for the request. Li Jie thereafter bore a deep resentment for Tian.

In 888, by which time Huang's rebellion had been crushed and the imperial court had returned to Chang'an, Emperor Xizong grew gravely ill. It was said that Emperor Xizong's younger brother and Li Jie's older brother Li Bao (李保) the Prince of Ji was the oldest among Emperor Xizong's surviving brothers and was considered wise, and so the imperial officials wanted him to succeed Emperor Xizong, but the powerful eunuch Yang Fugong (who had succeeded Tian as the surveyor of the eunuch-controlled Shence Armies) wanted Li Jie to succeed Emperor Xizong, so Emperor Xizong issued an edict creating Li Jie crown prince. Shortly after, Emperor Xizong died, and Li Jie, changing his name to Li Min, took the throne as Emperor Zhaozong. During the mourning period, the chancellor Wei Zhaodu served as regent.

== Reign ==
=== Campaigns against Chen Jingxuan and Li Keyong ===
Emperor Zhaozong's ascension created great anticipation in the people's minds, as he was considered intelligent, handsome, decisive, and talented, with ambitions to restore imperial power that had been lost during Emperor Xizong's reign. Not long after taking the throne, he changed his name further to Li Ye.

As soon as Emperor Zhaozong took the throne, he received petitions from Wang Jian and Gu Yanlang, advocating that Tian Lingzi's brother Chen Jingxuan the military governor of Xichuan Circuit (西川, headquartered in modern Chengdu, Sichuan), be removed from his post. (Wang, who was allied with Gu (the military governor of neighboring Dongchuan Circuit (東川, headquartered in modern Mianyang, Sichuan), had been fighting Chen for the control of Xichuan but was unable to prevail against Chen by himself.) Still resenting Tian, who was then sheltered by Chen from edicts that Emperor Xizong had previously entered ordering Tian into exile, Emperor Zhaozong ordered Chen back to Chang'an and commissioned Wei Zhaodu as his replacement. When Chen refused to be replaced, Emperor Zhaozong ordered a general campaign against him, with Wei in command, assisted by Wang, Gu, and Yang Fugong's adoptive nephew Yang Shouliang the military governor of Shannan West Circuit (山南西道, headquartered in modern Hanzhong, Shaanxi).

While the campaign against Chen was starting, another campaign that had been ongoing during the latter years of Emperor Zhaozong's reign was ending. Qin Zongquan, formerly the Tang military governor of Fengguo Circuit (奉國, headquartered in modern Zhumadian, Henan), had declared himself emperor at Fengguo's capital Cai Prefecture (蔡州) in 885 and had sent out armies to conquer the nearby Tang circuits. By 888, his power had waned under attacks by Tang's military governor of Xuanwu Circuit (宣武, headquartered in modern Kaifeng, Henan), Zhu Quanzhong, and in late 888 he was overthrown in a coup by his officer Shen Cong (申叢); he was subsequently delivered to Zhu, who then delivered him to Chang'an to be executed.

Even though Yang Fugong had been instrumental in having Emperor Zhaozong made emperor, by 889 conflicts had begun between the emperor and the chief eunuch, leading to a public argument between Yang and the chancellors Kong Wei on one occasion over Kong's accusation that Yang was disrespecting the emperor. Nothing further came of the dispute publicly at this point, however. Nevertheless, at the suggestion of Kong's colleague Zhang Jun, who advocated that a strong imperial army directly under the emperor was essential for the restoration of imperial power to counteract the warlords and the eunuch-commanded Shence Armies, Emperor Zhaozong began recruiting an imperial army that eventually numbered 100,000 by spring 890.

At that point, Kong and Zhang believed that it was time to test this army, to show its strengths in the struggle against Yang at court. Zhang, therefore, advocated a campaign against the warlord Li Keyong the military governor of Hedong Circuit (河東, headquartered in modern Taiyuan, Shanxi)—one of the most powerful warlords of the realm and archrival to the also powerful Zhu Quanzhong—as both Zhu and Li Kuangwei the military governor of Lulong were at that time also requesting an imperial campaign against the expanding Li Keyong. Emperor Zhaozong, despite his reservations, approved the campaign, which got under way in summer 890, with Zhu's army attacking Zhaoyi Circuit (昭義, headquartered in modern Changzhi, Shanxi), then also under Li Keyong's control, from the southeast; Li Kuangwei and Helian Duo the military governor of Datong Circuit (大同, headquartered in modern Datong, Shanxi) attacking from the northeast; and the main imperial army, under Zhang's command and supplemented by the armies of various circuits around Chang'an, attacking from the southwest.

Zhu's army was able to seize Zhaoyi quickly, due to the assassination of Zhaoyi's military governor Li Kegong (李克恭, Li Keyong's brother) by his officer An Jushou (安居受), but the imperial official sent to take over Zhaoyi, Sun Kui (孫揆), was intercepted and captured by Li Keyong's adoptive son Li Cunxiao (and subsequently executed when he would not submit to Li Keyong), badly affecting the imperial army's morale. Li Cunxiao subsequently put Zhaoyi's capital Lu Prefecture (潞州) under siege, forcing Zhu's army to withdraw. Li Kuangwei and Helian's armies were also repelled by Li Keyong's adoptive sons Li Cunxin and Li Siyuan, leaving Zhang's imperial army to face Li Keyong himself. By late 890, the imperial army was suffering repeated defeats at the hands of Li Keyong's Hedong army, and the supplemental troops from Jingnan (靜難, headquartered in modern Xianyang, Shaanxi) and Fengxiang (鳳翔, headquartered in modern Baoji, Shaanxi) Circuits abandoned the imperial army and withdrew by themselves, eventually leading to a total collapse of the imperial army, with Zhang and his deputy, Han Jian the military governor of Zhenguo Circuit (鎮國, headquartered in modern Weinan, Shaanxi) escaping with just a small contingent; the rest of the imperial army was effectively lost. With Li Keyong subsequently threatening an invasion, Emperor Zhaozong was forced to restore Li Keyong to his titles and positions and exile Zhang and Kong, ending the campaign against Li Keyong in disaster.

With the defeat against Li Keyong, and the campaign against Chen in a stalemate—the imperial army had put Xichuan's capital Chengdu under siege and caused a terrible famine within the city, but had not been able to capture it—the imperial treasury was being drained, and Emperor Zhaozong decided to end the Xichuan campaign as well. He pardoned Chen and recalled Wei, while ordering Gu and Wang (for whom he had created a Yongping Circuit (永平) out of parts of Xichuan territory) back to their circuits. Wang was unwilling to accept this result, however, and he intimidated Wei into returning to Chang'an by himself, while Wang continued the siege of Chengdu. In fall 891, Chen and Tian surrendered to Wang, and Wang took over Xichuan Circuit.

=== Initial conflict with Li Maozhen ===
The end of the campaign against Li Keyong, which Yang Fugong had opposed, did not end the tension between Emperor Zhaozong and Yang, but intensified it. In fall 891, Yang sought to retire, and Emperor Zhaozong approved the retirement. Soon thereafter, rumors that Yang was planning a rebellion at Chang'an against the emperor, along with his adoptive nephew Yang Shouxin (楊守信). Emperor Zhaozong sent the imperial guards to preemptively attack Yang Fugong's mansion, and Yang Fugong and Yang Shouxin fled to Yang Shouliang's Shannan West Circuit. Yang Fugong thereafter started a rebellion against the imperial government, along with Yang Shouliang, Yang Shouxin, and other adoptive sons and nephews, including Yang Shouzhong (楊守忠) the military governor of Jinshang Circuit (金商, headquartered in modern Ankang, Shaanxi), Yang Shouzhen (楊守貞) the military governor of Longjian Circuit (龍劍, headquartered in modern Mianyang, Sichuan), and Yang Shouhou (楊守厚) the prefect of Mian Prefecture (綿州, also in modern Mianyang).

In response to the Yangs' rebellion, Li Maozhen the military governor of Fengxiang Circuit (鳳翔, headquartered in modern Baoji, Shaanxi), along with his allies Wang Xingyu the military governor of Jingnan Circuit (靜難, headquartered in modern Xianyang, Shaanxi) and Han Jian, as well as his brother Li Maozhuang (李茂莊) the military governor of Tianxiong Circuit (天雄, headquartered in modern Tianshui, Gansu) and Wang Xingyu's brother Wang Xingyue (王行約) the military governor of Kuangguo Circuit (匡國, headquartered in modern Weinan), submitted a joint petition for Li Maozhen to be made the commander of the forces against the Yangs. Emperor Zhaozong, while inimical to the Yangs, was hesitant to give Li Maozhen more authority and territory, and therefore initially denied the request. However, Li Maozhen and Wang Xingyu launched an attack anyway, forcing Emperor Zhaozong into approving Li Maozhen as the commander against the Yangs. By winter 892, Xingyuan had fallen to Li Maozhen, and the Yangs fled (and were eventually captured by Han and delivered to Chang'an to be executed).

Li Maozhen wanted to add Shannan West to his territory, so he requested to be Shannan West's military governor, fully expecting that Emperor Zhaozong would allow him to retain both Fengxiang and Shannan West. Instead, Emperor Zhaozong issued an edict making him the military governor of Shannan West and Wuding (武定, headquartered in modern Hanzhong) Circuits, while making the chancellor Xu Yanruo the military governor of Fengxiang. Despite the misgivings of the chancellor Du Rangneng, Emperor Zhaozong launched a campaign against Li Maozhen, with Du in charge of the logistics and Li Sizhou (李嗣周) the Prince of Qin in command of the imperial guards, which Emperor Zhaozong had rebuilt with new recruits. The imperial army had low morale and little battle experience, however, and when Li Sizhou set to engage Li Maozhen and Wang Xingyu's experienced armies, the army collapsed. Li Maozhen approached Chang'an, demanding Du's death. Emperor Zhaozong capitulated, ordering Du to commit suicide and allowing Li Maozhen to retain Fengxiang, Shannan West, Wuding, and Tianxiong. It was said that after this point, Li Maozhen and Wang Xingyu, in alliance with the chancellor Cui Zhaowei, were heavily influencing imperial governance, such that the emperor would not dare to carry out any measures that they opposed.

The next point of contention came in 895, when Wang Chongying the military governor of Huguo Circuit (護國, headquartered in modern Yuncheng, Shanxi), died, precipitating a succession struggle between his nephew Wang Ke (the adoptive son of Wang Chongying's brother and predecessor Wang Chongrong and biological son of another brother, Wang Chongjian (王重簡)), whom the Huguo soldiers supported, and his son Wang Gong the military governor of Baoyi Circuit (保義, headquartered in modern Sanmenxia, Henan), who coveted the more prosperous Huguo Circuit. Li Keyong supported Wang Ke, while Li Maozhen, Wang Xingyu, and Han supported Wang Gong, and all of them submitted competing petitions on the behalf of the feuding cousins. Emperor Zhaozong approved Li Keyong's petition and made Wang Ke the military governor of Huguo. In response, Li Maozhen, Wang Xingyu, and Han marched on the capital again, killing the chancellors Wei Zhaodu (who had returned to chancellorship after the Xichuan campaign) and Li Xi, whom they perceived to be behind Emperor Zhaozong's decision.

The actions of Li Maozhen, Wang Xingyu, and Han, in turn, drew a strong reaction from Li Keyong, who launched his army, crossed the Yellow River, and prepared to attack the three of them. Rumors developed that Li Maozhen and Wang Xingyu both wanted to seize the emperor and take him to their domains. Emperor Zhaozong, in response, fled into the Qinling Mountains with his officials, and the people of Chang'an followed in droves. Meanwhile, Li Keyong engaged and defeated Wang's and Li Maozhen's troops, then put Wang's capital Bin Prefecture (邠州) under siege. Wang fled and was killed by his own subordinates in flight. Li Maozhen and Han capitulated, sending apologies and tributes to Emperor Zhaozong. Emperor Zhaozong, who returned to Chang'an, bestowed great honors on Li Keyong and his key subordinates, but hesitated when Li Keyong proposed to attack Li Maozhen, believing that if Li Keyong destroyed Li Maozhen, the balance of power would be lost. He therefore forbade Li Keyong from attacking Li Maozhen. Li Keyong withdrew to Hedong Circuit, and, owing to his eventual defeats at the hands of Zhu Quanzhong, would not be able to return again.

=== Flight to Hua Prefecture ===
With Li Keyong gone from the region, Li Maozhen, who had been intimidated into an apologetic posture to the imperial court, again became arrogant. He became suspicious of Emperor Zhaozong's attempts to rebuild the imperial guards and putting them under the commands of imperial princes, including Li Sizhou, Li Jiepi (李戒丕) the Prince of Yan, and Emperor Zhaozong's uncle Li Zi the Prince of Tong. In summer 896, he launched an attack on Chang'an. Emperor Zhaozong immediately sought aid from Li Keyong, but with Li Keyong being unable to launch an army at that time and Li Maozhen's forces having defeated Li Sizhou's, Li Sizhou recommended fleeing to Hedong. Emperor Zhaozong initially agreed and prepared to head for Fu Prefecture (鄜州, in modern Yan'an, Shaanxi), preparing to cross the Yellow River to Hedong from there; he also sent Li Jiepi to Hedong to prepare for his arrival. However, after he left Chang'an, Han Jian sent emissaries, and then personally arrived to meet with him, to persuade him to go to Zhenguo's capital Hua Prefecture (華州) instead, promising to do all he could to uphold imperial power. As both Emperor Zhaozong and his officials were fearful of the lengthy trek to Hedong, Emperor Zhaozong agreed and headed for Hua Prefecture instead.

Once Emperor Zhaozong arrived at Hua Prefecture, however, he became effectively under Han's control, and Han stopped any real imperial attempt to engage Li Maozhen militarily. Further, he forced Emperor Zhaozong to disband the imperial guards under the imperial princes' control, and, after Li Jiepi returned from Hedong—thus exposing the fact that Li Keyong was in no shape to launch an army to aid the emperor—slaughtered 11 imperial princes.

Emperor Zhaozong made peace with Li Maozhen in spring 898, restoring the titles that he had previously stripped from Li Maozhen. With Zhu Quanzhong urging the emperor to move the capital to the eastern capital Luoyang, Han and Li Maozhen became apprehensive that he would launch an army to seize the emperor, and therefore repaired the palaces and governmental offices at Chang'an (which Li Maozhen's army had destroyed). In fall 898, Emperor Zhaozong returned to Chang'an, but with no army around him now other than the eunuch-controlled Shence Armies.

=== Removal and restoration ===
Meanwhile, also rising in power at court was the chancellor Cui Yin, who hated the eunuchs ardently and who was allied with Zhu Quanzhong. By 900, Emperor Zhaozong, who had come to trust Cui and who would later describe him as "faithful but trickier" (than Han Wo, the official the emperor was making the comment to) was planning with Cui to slaughter the eunuchs. When Cui's fellow chancellor Wang Tuan urged against such action, believing the plans to be too drastic, Cui accused Wang of being in league with the powerful eunuchs Zhu Daobi (朱道弼) and Jing Wuxiu (景務脩), who served as the directors of palace communications (Shumishi). Upon Cui's accusations, Emperor Zhaozong ordered Wang, Zhu Daobi, and Jing to commit suicide, and it was said that from this point Cui became the leading figure at court, with the eunuchs angry at and fearful of him.

The eunuchs also had become fearful of Emperor Zhaozong himself, who, after returning from Hua Prefecture, was described to be depressed, alcoholic, and unpredictable in his temperament. The four top-ranked eunuchs—Liu Jishu and Wang Zhongxian (王仲先) the commanders of the Shence Armies, and Wang Yanfan (王彥範) and Xue Qiwo (薛齊偓) the new directors of palace communications—began plotting to remove him. After an incident in winter 900 in which Emperor Zhaozong, in a drunken rage, killed several attending eunuchs and ladies in waiting, Liu Jishu led Shence Army troops into the palace and forced Emperor Zhaozong to yield the throne to his son Li Yu, Prince of De the Crown Prince. Emperor Zhaozong and his wife (Li Yu's mother) Empress He were honored as retired emperor (Taishang Huang) and retired empress (Taishang Huanghou) but put under house arrest. Li Yu, whose name the eunuchs changed to Li Zhen, was proclaimed emperor, but the eunuchs controlled the court. They wanted to kill Cui, but was fearful that Cui's ally Zhu Quanzhong might react violently, so they only relieved Cui from his secondary posts as the director of finances and the director of salt and iron monopolies.

Cui, in turn, was in communications with Zhu, plotting to restore the emperor. He also persuaded the Shence Army officer Sun Dezhao (孫德昭) to join his cause, and Sun in turn persuaded his fellow officers Dong Yanbi (董彥弼) and Zhou Chenghui (周承誨) to join. In spring 901, they acted. They first ambushed and killed Wang Zhongxian, and captured Liu and Wang Yanfan, who were then killed by caning. Xue tried to commit suicide by drowning, but was taken out of the water and decapitated. Emperor Zhaozong was restored to the throne. In gratitude to the three officers, he bestowed the imperial clan name of Li on them, renaming them Li Jizhao (李繼昭), Li Yanbi (李彥弼), and Li Jihui (李繼誨) respectively.

=== Flight to Fengxiang ===
Shortly after Emperor Zhaozong's restoration, Li Maozhen showed an intent of reestablishing his relationship with the emperor by visiting Chang'an to pay homage to Emperor Zhaozong. While Li Maozhen was still at Chang'an, Cui Yin made a proposal intending to eliminate the control that the eunuchs had over the Shence Armies—that he and fellow chancellor Lu Yi be put in command of the Shence Armies. This proposal was opposed by Li Jizhao, Li Jihui, and Li Yanbi, however, and as Cui cited, as a rationale, the possibility that the Shence Armies could thus counteract the warlords, Li Maozhen was also suspicious of it. Emperor Zhaozong therefore rejected the proposal, and put the eunuchs Han Quanhui and Zhang Yanhong (張彥弘), both of whom had previously served as eunuch monitors of the Fengxiang army, in command of the Shence Armies, and further wanted the retired eunuch Yan Zunmei (嚴遵美) to serve as the overseer of both Shence Armies, but Yan declined and remained in retirement. Cui, apprehensive of allowing the eunuchs to command the Shence Armies again, requested Li Maozhen to leave a corps of Fengxiang troops at Chang'an to counteract the eunuchs; Li Maozhen agreed, and left his adoptive son Li Jiyun (李繼筠) in command of the Fengxiang soldiers at Chang'an.

Despite this setback, Cui continued to try to plan to slaughter the eunuchs. The eunuchs headed by Han eventually became aware of this, and, in order to reduce Cui's power, they had the Shence Army soldiers claim that Cui was not giving them the proper winter uniforms. Emperor Zhaozong was forced to again remove Cui from his post as the director of salt and iron monopolies. Moreover, by this point they had persuaded Li Jiyun and his Fengxiang soldiers to be on their side. Cui, realizing that the eunuchs were intending to destroy him, became fearful, and wrote Zhu Quanzhong, urging him to bring troops to Chang'an to act against the eunuchs. Zhu agreed, and began mobilizing his army.

Han and the other eunuchs, hearing of Zhu's impending arrival, believed that Zhu's forces were intending to slaughter them. They, with the cooperation of Li Jiyun, Li Jihui, and Li Yanbi (but not Li Jizhao, who refused to align with them), seized Emperor Zhaozong and his household, and took them to Fengxiang's capital Fengxiang Municipality. Cui and the imperial officials largely remained at Chang'an, although some followed the emperor and the eunuchs to Fengxiang. After Zhu arrived at Chang'an to confer with Cui, he advanced to Fengxiang and put it under siege. Li Maozhen sought an alliance with Wang Jian. Wang Jian, however, tried to play both sides—outwardly aligning with Zhu, but secretly encouraging Li Maozhen to resist Zhu, while sending an army to head north to attack Li Maozhen's Shannan West Circuit.

With Fengxiang under siege, Li Maozhen's holdings in the Guanzhong region fell one by one to Zhu, while Shannan West and nearby holdings fell to Wang. Still, Fengxiang's defenses were holding, and by fall 902, Zhu, with his attacks hampered by rains and illnesses to the soldiers, was considering a withdrawal. A trap advocated by and set by Zhu's officer Gao Jichang, however, induced Li Maozhen to send his troops outside the city walls to attack Zhu's troops, where they were crushed by Zhu's troops. From this point on, Li Maozhen could not fight back against Zhu any more, and by winter 902, Fengxiang was in such a desperate shape such that the residents were resorting to cannibalism. In spring 903, Li Maozhen sued for peace with Zhu, surrendering Emperor Zhaozong and the imperial household to him while killing Han and the other leading eunuchs, as well as Li Jiyun, Li Jihui, and Li Yanbi. Zhu took the emperor back to Chang'an, where one of the first actions Zhu and Cui carried out was to slaughter the remaining eunuchs, regardless of whether they supported Han's actions. This would be the effective end of the Shence Armies.

=== Control by Zhu Quanzhong and movement to Luoyang ===
After Emperor Zhaozong returned to Chang'an, the capital became under the military control of the Xuanwu contingent; while Zhu Quanzhong himself returned to Xuanwu's capital Daliang, he left his nephew Zhu Youlun (朱友倫) in command at Chang'an. Cui Yin began to see signs that Zhu Quanzhong might be intending to seize the throne and became fearful, and therefore began to rebuild the imperial guards with himself in command, and a rift began to develop between Zhu and Cui. The rift became deeper after Zhu Youlun died in an accident while playing polo late in 903, which Zhu Quanzhong believed to be a murderous plot set up by Cui. He sent another nephew, Zhu Youliang (朱友諒), to succeed Zhu Youlun, and further sent Xuanwu soldiers to infiltrate the imperial guards corps that Cui was trying to rebuild. In spring 904, he acted, writing to Cui and his associates Zheng Yuangui (鄭元規) the mayor of Jingzhao Municipality (京兆, i.e., the Chang'an region) and the officer Chen Ban (陳班), and then sending Xuanwu soldiers to surround Cui's mansion and kill Cui and his associates. Then, citing the possibility that Li Maozhen and his adoptive son Li Jihui (not the same person as the one killed in 903) the military governor of Jingnan Circuit may attack Chang'an, he forced Emperor Zhaozong to abandon Chang'an and move the capital to Luoyang. While on the journey to Luoyang, Emperor Zhaozong sent secret orders to Wang Jian, Yang Xingmi the military governor of Huainan Circuit (淮南, headquartered in modern Yangzhou, Huainan), and Li Keyong, asking them to start a campaign against Zhu Quanzhong, but his orders drew no immediate reactions.

=== Death ===
Meanwhile, Zhu Quanzhong had long wanted to kill Li Yu, outwardly on the account that Li Yu had once improperly taken the throne (albeit under the eunuchs' pressure), but truly because he was apprehensive of Li Yu's status as the emperor's oldest son and his handsome appearance. Emperor Zhaozong resisted Zhu's wishes on this issue. Further, at that time, Li Maozhen, Li Jihui, Li Keyong, Liu Rengong the military governor of Lulong Circuit (盧龍, headquartered in modern Beijing), Wang Jian, Yang Xingmi, and Zhao Kuangning the military governor of Zhongyi Circuit (忠義, headquartered in modern Xiangyang, Hubei) were all issuing declarations calling for the emperor's return to Chang'an. Zhu became apprehensive that, as he battled other warlords in campaigns, Emperor Zhaozong might find a way to rise against him at Luoyang, and therefore resolved to remove the emperor. In fall 904, he had his associate Jiang Xuanhui (蔣玄暉), along with his adoptive son Zhu Yougong (朱友恭) and officer Shi Shucong (氏叔琮), take soldiers to the palace and assassinate Emperor Zhaozong. Jiang initially issued a declaration blaming the assassination on Emperor Zhaozong's concubines Pei Zhenyi (裴貞一) and Li Jianrong (李漸榮), but Zhu later blamed it on Zhu Yougong and Shi and forced them to commit suicide. Emperor Zhaozong's son Li Zuo the Prince of Hui was first declared crown prince, and then emperor (as Emperor Ai). By 907, Emperor Ai would be forced to yield the throne to Zhu, ending Tang and starting Zhu's new Later Liang.

== Chancellors during reign ==
- Wei Zhaodu (888, 893–895)
- Kong Wei (888–891, 895)
- Du Rangneng (888–893)
- Zhang Jun (888–891)
- Liu Chongwang (889–892)
- Cui Zhaowei (891–895)
- Xu Yanruo (891–893, 894–900)
- Zheng Yanchang (892–894)
- Cui Yin (893–895, 896–899, 900–904)
- Zheng Qi (894)
- Li Xi (894, 895)
- Li Zhirou (895)
- Lu Xisheng (895)
- Wang Tuan (895–896, 896–900)
- Sun Wo (895–897)
- Lu Yi (896, 899–903)
- Zhu Pu (896–897)
- Cui Yuan (896–900, 904)
- Pei Zhi (900–903)
- Wang Pu (901–903)
- Pei Shu (901, 903–904)
- Lu Guangqi (901–902)
- Wei Yifan (902, 902)
- Su Jian (902–903)
- Dugu Sun (903–904)
- Liu Can (904)

== Family ==
- Empress Xuanmu, of the He clan (宣穆皇后 何氏; d. 906)
  - Li Yu, Prince of De (德王 李𥙿; d. 905), 1st son
  - Princess Pingyuan (平原公主), 2nd daughter
    - Married Li Jikan (李繼偘, 李继偘), a son of Li Maozhen, in 903
  - Li Zhu, Emperor Ai (哀皇帝 李柷; 892–908), 9th son
- Zhaoyi, of the Li clan (昭儀 李氏, d. 22 September 904), personal name Jianrong (漸榮/渐荣)
- Lady of Zhao, of the Chen clan (赵国夫人陈氏)
- Lady of Jin, of the Ke clan (金国夫人可证), personal name Zheng
- Lady of Wei, personal name Chongyan (魏国夫人 宠颜)
- Lady, of the Pei clan of Hedong (裴氏), personal name Zhenyi (贞一)
- Unknown
  - Li Yu, Prince of Di (棣王 李祤; d. 905), second son
  - Li Xi, Prince of Qian (虔王 李禊; d. 905), third son
  - Li Yin, Prince of Yi (沂王 李禋; d. 905), fourth son
  - Li Yi, Prince of Sui (遂王 李禕，遂王 李祎， d. 905), fifth son
  - Li Mi, Prince of Jing (景王 李秘; d. 905), eighth son
  - Li Qi, Prince of Qi (祁王 李祺; d. 905), tenth son
  - Li Zhen, Prince of Ya (雅王 李禛; d. 905), 11th son
  - Li Xiang, Prince of Qiong (瓊王 李祥; 琼王 李祥， d. 905), 12th son
  - Li Zhen, Prince of Duan (端王 李禎)
  - Li Qi, Prince of Feng (豐王 李祁，丰王 李祁)
  - Li Fu, Prince of He (和王 李福)
  - Li Xi, Prince of Deng (登王 李禧)
  - Li Hu, Prince of Jia (嘉王 李祜)
  - Li Zhi, Prince of Ying (穎王 李禔，颖王 李禔)
  - Li You, Prince of Cai (蔡王 李佑)
  - Princess Xin'an (新安公主)
  - Princess Xindou (信都公主)
  - Princess Yichang (益昌公主), seventh daughter
  - Princess Tangxing (唐興公主/唐兴公主)
  - Princess Deqing (德清公主)
  - Princess Taikang (太康公主)
  - Princess Yongming (永明公主; d. 906)
  - Princess Xinxing (新興公主，新兴公主)
  - Princess Pu'an (普安公主)
  - Princess Leping (樂平公主，乐平公主)

== Succession ==
Emperor Zhaozong of Tang House of Li Born: 31 March 867 Died: 22 September 904
Regnal titles
Preceded by Emperor Xizong of Tang	Emperor of the Tang dynasty 888–900	Succeeded by Li Yu, Prince of De
Preceded by Emperor Xizong of Tang	Emperor of China (most regions (Note: From 895 to 896, a large part of modern Zhejiang was under the rule of Dong Chang, who claimed title of emperor as a new state of Dayue Luoping (大越羅平).)); 888–900	Succeeded by Li Yu, Prince of De
Preceded by Qin Zongquan	Emperor of China (Henan); 888–900	Succeeded by Li Yu, Prince of De
Preceded by Li Yu, Prince of De	Emperor of the Tang dynasty 901–904	Succeeded by Emperor Ai of Tang
