= Pei Shu =

Chancellor in Tang dynasty China

Pei Shu (裴樞) (841-July 5, 905), courtesy name Jisheng (紀聖) or Huasheng (化聖), was an official of the Chinese Tang dynasty, who served two terms as chancellor during the reigns of Emperor Zhaozong and Emperor Zhaozong's son Emperor Ai, near the end of the dynasty. He was killed in a purge of high-level Tang officials by the warlord Zhu Quanzhong the military governor (Jiedushi) of Xuanwu Circuit (宣武, headquartered in modern Kaifeng, Henan), who was then preparing to seize the throne.

== Background ==
Pei Shu was born in 841, during the reign of Emperor Wuzong. He was from the Middle Juan Pei of Pei clan of Hedong, which claimed original ancestry from the mythical emperor Zhuanxu. Pei Shu's traceable ancestry included officials of the Han dynasty, Western Liang, Jin dynasty (266–420), Northern Wei, and Tang dynasty. Pei Shu's great-grandfather Pei Zunqing served as a chancellor during the reigns of Emperor Suzong and Emperor Suzong's son Emperor Daizong. His grandfather Pei Xiang (裴向) served in a number of important imperial offices, including as the chief judge of the supreme court. His father Pei Yin (裴寅) served as a chief imperial censor. He had at least one older brother, Pei Ge (裴格) – although, as he was referred to at one point as "the 14th Pei," that reference may imply that he was the 14th son.

== Early career ==
Pei Shu passed the imperial examinations in the Jinshi (進士) class in 871, during the reign of Emperor Wuzong's cousin Emperor Yizong. When the chancellor Du Shenquan was sent out of the imperial capital Chang'an to serve as the military governor of Hezhong Circuit (河中, headquartered in modern Yuncheng, Shanxi), Du invited Pei to serve as his secretary. Pei thereafter served as a copyeditor (校書郎, Xiaoshu Lang) at the Palace Library, and then the sheriff of Lantian County (藍田, in modern Xi'an, Shaanxi), but was also serving as a scholar at Hongwen Pavilion (弘文館). The chancellor Wang Duo, who headed the operations at Hongwen Pavilion, appreciated his abilities. Later, when Wang was removed from his chancellor position, Pei became stuck at his position and was unable to be promoted. It was only after he accompanied Emperor Yizong's son and successor Emperor Xizong on the flight from Chang'an to Chengdu (due to the attack on Chang'an by the major agrarian rebel Huang Chao in 880) that, at the recommendation of the deputy chief imperial censor Li Huan (李煥) that he was made a censor with the title Duanzhong Shi Yushi (殿中侍御史). He thereafter became an imperial chronicler (起居郎, Qiju Lang).

After Wang Duo became chancellor again in 881 and was put in command of the overall operations against Huang Chao's new state of Qi in 882, due to Pei's long association with Wang, Wang invited him to serve as Wang's secretary in Wang's role as the military governor of Yicheng Circuit (義成, headquartered in modern Anyang, Henan). Pei was later recalled to the imperial government to serve as Bingbu Yuanwailang (兵部員外郎), a low-level official at the ministry of defense (兵部, Bingbu), and then Libu Yuanwailang (吏部員外郎), a low-level official at the ministry of civil service affairs (吏部, Libu).

Early in the Longji era (889), by which time Emperor Xizong had died and been succeeded by his brother Emperor Zhaozong, Pei was made an imperial attendant (給事中, Jishizhong), and then the mayor of Jingzhao Municipality (京兆, i.e., the Chang'an region). He was particularly praised by the chancellor Kong Wei. After Kong was removed from his position in 891 after a failed campaign against the warlord Li Keyong the military governor of Hedong Circuit (河東, headquartered in modern Taiyuan, Shanxi), Pei was also demoted, as a result, to be Taizi You Shuzi (太子右庶子), a member of the Crown Prince's staff — an entirely honorary position as there was no crown prince at that time. He was then sent out of Chang'an to serve as the prefect of She Prefecture (歙州, in modern Huangshan, Anhui).

After being forced to surrender She Prefecture to the warlord Yang Xingmi the military governor of Huainan Circuit (淮南, headquartered in modern Yangzhou, Jiangsu) in 893, Pei was recalled to the imperial government to serve as You Sanqi Changshi (右散騎常侍), a high-level advisory official at the legislative bureau of government (中書省, Zhongshu Sheng). On the way back to Chang'an, he went through Xuanwu Circuit, whose military governor, Zhu Quanzhong, had already become a powerful warlord. He met with Zhu and honored Zhu as an older brother, pleasing Zhu. When Emperor Zhaozong was forced to abandon Chang'an and flee to Hua Prefecture (華州, in modern Weinan, Shaanxi) in 896 due to an attack by Li Maozhen the military governor of Fengxiang Circuit (鳳翔, headquartered in modern Baoji, Shaanxi), Pei followed the emperor to Hua Prefecture, and was subsequently sent as an imperial emissary to Xuanwu. Because of the prior friendly relationship he established with Zhu, Zhu offered much tribute to the imperial court at that time, pleasing Emperor Zhaozong, who promoted Pei to be the deputy minister of defense (兵部侍郎, Bingbu Shilang). As the chancellor Cui Yin was also an ally of Zhu's, Cui and Pei also became allies, and at Cui's recommendation he was made the deputy minister of civil service affairs (吏部侍郎, Libu Shilang).

== Chancellorships ==
In spring 901, shortly after Emperor Zhaozong was deposed in a coup led by the eunuch Liu Jishu and then restored in a countercoup, Pei Shu was made deputy minister of census (戶部侍郎, Hubu Shilang) and chancellor, with the designation Tong Zhongshu Menxia Pingzhangshi (同中書門下平章事). Later in the year, fearing that Emperor Zhaozong and Cui Yin were, in association with Zhu Quanzhong, set on slaughtering them, the eunuchs, then led by Han Quanhui and Zhang Yanhong (張彥弘), forcibly took Emperor Zhaozong to Fengxiang (as the eunuchs were then allied with Li Maozhen). Cui, Pei, and the other chancellors remained at Chang'an, and subsequently, an edict was issued in Emperor Zhaozong's name removing them from their chancellor posts, with Pei keeping his post as deputy minister of census.

In 903, after Zhu had defeated Li and forced him to surrender the emperor, Emperor Zhaozong returned to Chang'an; he subsequently made Pei the military governor of Qinghai Circuit (清海, headquartered in modern Guangzhou, Guangdong), carrying the Tong Zhongshu Menxia Pingzhangshi and You Pushe (右僕射) titles as honorary titles. However, Zhu then submitted a petition arguing that Pei was good at managing the state and should not be sent out of the capital. Emperor Zhaozong therefore made Pei chancellor again with the designation of Tong Zhongshu Menxia Pingzhangshi as well as Menxia Shilang (門下侍郎), the deputy head of the examination bureau of government (門下省, Menxia Sheng). Pei was also put in charge of editing the imperial histories.

While Zhu Quanzhong and Cui were long-time allies, Zhu eventually came to suspect that Cui was organizing a new imperial army to oppose him, and that Cui was behind the death of his nephew Zhu Youlun (朱友倫), whom Zhu Quanzhong had left in command of a Xuanwu contingent at Chang'an to guard the emperor but who died in a polo accident in late 903. In spring 904, Zhu Quanzhong submitted a forceful petition to Emperor Zhaozong accusing Cui of treason, and subsequently killed Cui. Then, he issued an order to Pei that the capital, and the emperor, should be moved to the eastern capital Luoyang, and subsequently had his troops force the emperor and the residents of Chang'an to abandon Chang'an and move to Luoyang. Later in the year, Zhu had Emperor Zhaozong assassinated; Emperor Zhaozong's son Li Zuo the Prince of Hui was declared emperor (as Emperor Ai). Pei continued to serve as chancellor.

== Final removal and death ==
Meanwhile, the long-time association between Zhu Quanzhong and Pei Shu also became strained after Emperor Ai's ascension. Zhu had one of his own associates, Liu Can, made chancellor as well, but Pei, along with chancellors Dugu Sun and Cui Yuan, did not respect Liu, causing Liu to make false accusations against them to Zhu. The matter came to a head when Zhu wanted a performer that he favored, Zhang Tingfan (張廷範), made the minister of worship (太常卿, Taichang Qing). Pei, not wanting to carry this out, tried to deflect Zhu's recommendation by stating, "Zhang Tingfan had great accomplishments and should be a military governor. Why would he happy by merely being a minister? I do not believe that this really is the will of the Generalissimo [(i.e., Zhu)]." He refused to approve Zhang's commission, and Zhu, upon hearing this, stated, "I had long thought that the 14th Pei to be true and pure, not frivolous. His comments have showed his true self." This incident, in combination with Liu's accusations, caused Zhu to have him, as well as Dugu and Cui, removed from chancellorship in spring 905. Pei was made Zuo Pushe (左僕射), one of the heads of the executive bureau (尚書省, Shangshu Sheng).

With Zhu preparing to seize the throne, Liu and another associate of Zhu's, Li Zhen, argued for a general purge of high-level imperial officials who were from aristocratic families. Zhu agreed, and initially a large number of them were demoted and exiled — in Pei's case, to be the prefect of Deng Prefecture (登州, in modern Penglai, Shandong), and then to be the census officer of Shuang Prefecture (瀧州, in modern Yunfu, Guangdong). Soon thereafter, some 30 of these officials — including Pei, Dugu, Cui, fellow former chancellors Lu Yi, Wang Pu, and other officials Zhao Chong (趙崇) and Wang Zan (王贊) — were rounded up at Baima Station (白馬驛, in modern Anyang, Henan) and ordered to commit suicide. At Li Zhen's request (as Li Zhen, who was unable to pass the imperial examinations, resented these traditional aristocrats for claiming to be free from taint), Zhu had their bodies thrown into the Yellow River (as Li Zhen put it, to taint them).

== Notes and references ==
- Old Book of Tang, vol. 113.
- New Book of Tang, vol. 140.
- Zizhi Tongjian, vols. 259, 262, 264, 265.
