= Lu Guangqi =

Lu Guangqi (盧光啟) (died March 6, 903), courtesy name Zizhong (子忠), was an official of the Chinese Tang dynasty, who briefly served as chancellor from 901 to 902, while Emperor Zhaozong was under the physical control of the warlord Li Maozhen the military governor (Jiedushi) of Fengxiang Circuit (鳳翔, headquartered in modern Baoji, Shaanxi) and Li's eunuch allies, led by Han Quanhui. After Li Maozhen was forced to surrender Emperor Zhaozong to another warlord, Zhu Quanzhong the military governor of Xuanwu Circuit (宣武, headquartered in modern Kaifeng, Henan), Lu was forced to commit suicide.

== Background and early career ==
It is not known when Lu Guangqi is born, and it is not known where he, or even his family, was from. All that is known about his family, which was not connected to the families of other Tang dynasty chancellors named Lu, are that his grandfather was named Lu Zhi (盧質), his father was named Lu Zhou (盧晝), and that he had at least one older brother named Lu Guangji (盧光濟); none of the three was listed with any official titles.

Lu Guangqi passed the imperial examinations in the Jinshi (進士) class at some point and was favored by the chancellor Zhang Jun. He went through a series of promotions, eventually reaching the post of deputy minister of defense (兵部侍郎, Bingbu Shilang).

== As chancellor ==
In late 901, the powerful eunuchs, led by Han Quanhui, fearing that then-reigning Emperor Zhaozong and the leading chancellor Cui Yin were about to massacre them, seized Emperor Zhaozong and took him to Fengxiang Circuit, ruled by Han's ally Li Maozhen. All of the chancellors, led by Cui, remained at the imperial capital Chang'an to await the arrival of Cui's ally Zhu Quanzhong, but some imperial officials followed Emperor Zhaozong to Fengxiang. While Emperor Zhaozong was still en route to Fengxiang, he (or the eunuchs, in his name) put Lu Guangqi in charge of the office of the chancellors, thus making him, in effect, a chancellor, albeit without the usual chancellor designation Tong Zhongshu Menxia Pingzhangshi (同中書門下平章事). After Emperor Zhaozong's arrival in Fengxiang, Lu was given the more formalized chancellor designation Canzhi Jiwu (參知機務), but still not Tong Zhongshu Menxia Pingzhangshi; he was also made a You Jianyi Daifu (右諫議大夫), a high-level advisor at the legislative bureau of government (中書省, Zhongshu Sheng). In 902, while Emperor Zhaozong was still at Fengxiang, Lu was removed from his chancellor position and made a senior advisor to the Crown Prince.

== Death ==
In 903, with Fengxiang under siege by Zhu Quanzhong, Li Maozhen was forced to slaughter the eunuchs and sue for peace by agreeing to surrender the emperor to Zhu. Lu accompanied Emperor Zhaozong back to Chang'an, and after arrival in Chang'an, was, at Cui Yin's instigation, forced to commit suicide, along with another chancellor commissioned at Fengxiang, Su Jian.

== Notes and references ==
- New Book of Tang, vol. 182.
- Zizhi Tongjian, vols. 262, 263, 264.
