= Su Jian =

Chinese Tang official

Su Jian (蘇檢) (died March 6, 903), courtesy name Shengyong (聖用), was an official of the Chinese Tang dynasty, who briefly served as chancellor from 902 to 903, while Emperor Zhaozong was under the physical control of the warlord Li Maozhen the military governor (Jiedushi) of Fengxiang Circuit (鳳翔, headquartered in modern Baoji, Shaanxi) and Li's eunuch allies, led by Han Quanhui. After Li Maozhen was forced to surrender Emperor Zhaozong to another warlord, Zhu Quanzhong, the military governor of Xuanwu Circuit (宣武, headquartered in modern Kaifeng, Henan), Su was forced to commit suicide.

== Background ==
Little is known about Su Jian's family background, as he did not have a biography in either of the official histories of the Tang dynasty, the Old Book of Tang and the New Book of Tang, and it is not known when or where he was born. According to the table of the chancellors' family trees in the New Book of Tang, Su's family was described as "from Wugong". His grandfather was named Su Tiao (蘇迢), and his father was named Su Meng (蘇蒙); neither was listed with any official titles.

Little is also known about Su's early career. According to the biography of Su's chancellor colleague Lu Guangqi in the New Book of Tang, Su had, at one point, served as the prefect of Yang Prefecture (洋州, in modern Hanzhong, Shaanxi). When, in late 901, then-reigning Emperor Zhaozong was forcibly taken by the eunuchs led by Han Quanhui to Fengxiang, then ruled by the eunuchs' ally Li Maozhen, with most of the imperial officials remaining at the capital Chang'an, Su and another prefect, Wei Yifan, went to Fengxiang. Su was thereafter made Zhongshu Sheren (中書舍人), a mid-level official at the legislative bureau (中書省, Zhongshu Sheng), while, at Li's recommendation, Wei was made a chancellor.

== As chancellor ==
In spring 902, apparently at Li Maozhen's recommendation, Wei Yifan was made chancellor, even though the commission came at Emperor Zhaozong's disgust. However, several months later, Wei's mother died, and he had to leave governmental service to observe a mourning period. The eunuchs initially wanted the imperial scholar Yao Ji to be made chancellor, but Yao declined the commission at the advice of his imperial scholar colleague Han Wo, who cited the likelihood of eventual retaliation by Zhu Quanzhong, the military governor of Xuanwu Circuit, who had by that point put Fengxiang Circuit's capital Fengxiang Municipality under siege to try to take the emperor from Li. With Yao having declined the commission, Li and the eunuchs feared that Emperor Zhaozong might take this opportunity to commission someone he himself wanted, so they recommended Su. Soon thereafter, Su was made the deputy minister of public works (工部侍郎, Gongbu Shilang) and chancellor, with the designation Tong Zhongshu Menxia Pingzhangshi (同中書門下平章事).

Su remained an ally of Li's thereafter, and when Emperor Zhaozong then initially declined Li's recommendation to return Wei to chancellorship, it was to Su that Li lodged his complaint. (Wei was eventually restored to chancellorship anyway.) Su wanted Han to join him as chancellor and made much effort to persuade Li and the eunuchs to agree; however, Han, in harsh terms, pointed out to Su that he and Wei had absolutely no accomplishments as chancellors and that he would be ashamed to receive such a commission, particularly given the dire conditions that Fengxiang was in then, under Zhu's siege. With food supplies running out and the residents of Fengxiang resorting to cannibalism, in 903, Li sued for peace, agreeing to surrender the emperor to Zhu. As part of his arrangement to try to maintain some form of connection with the emperor, Li had his son Li Jikan (李繼侃) marry Princess Pingyuan, the daughter of Emperor Zhaozong and Empress He, while Emperor Zhaozong's son Li Mi (李秘) the Prince of Jing married Su's daughter. Li thereafter surrendered the emperor to Zhu; subsequently, Zhu and his chancellor ally Cui Yin carried out a massacre of the eunuchs and escorted the emperor back to Chang'an. At Emperor Zhaozong's instruction, Zhu also wrote Li Maozhen and demanded the return of Princess Pingyuan; Li Maozhen was forced to return her as well. There was no historical mention as to whether Li Mi and Su's daughter remained married. Su accompanied the emperor back to Chang'an. However, soon thereafter, apparently at Cui's instigation, Su and Lu Guangqi (who was also commissioned at Fengxiang) were forced to commit suicide.
