= Dugu Sun =

Dugu Sun (Chinese: 獨孤損; Vietnamese: Độc Cô Tồn; died July 5, 905), courtesy name Yousun (又損), was an official of the Chinese Tang dynasty, serving as a chancellor during the reigns of Emperor Zhaozong and Emperor Zhaozong's son Emperor Ai, near the end of the dynasty. He was killed in a purge of high-level Tang officials by the warlord Zhu Quanzhong the military governor (Jiedushi) of Xuanwu Circuit (宣武, headquartered in modern Kaifeng, Henan), who was then preparing to seize the throne.

== Background ==
It is not known when or where Dugu Sun was born, and not much is known about his earlier career as there was no biography of his in either of the official histories of the Tang dynasty, the Old Book of Tang and the New Book of Tang. It is known, from the table of the chancellors' family trees in the New Book of Tang, that his family claimed to have been originally descended from Emperor Guangwu of Han, through Emperor Guangwu's son Liu Fu (劉輔) the Prince of Pei, and that a subsequent ancestor, Liu Jinbo (劉進伯), was captured during a campaign against the Xiongnu; under this claim, Liu Jinbo's descendants later became the Dugu tribe. Subsequent ancestors of Dugu Sun served as leaders of the Dugu tribe, which eventually became part of Northern Wei and followed Emperor Xiaowen of Northern Wei's migration to Luoyang. Subsequent ancestors served as officials of Northern Wei, Northern Zhou, the Sui dynasty, and Tang. Dugu Sun's grandfather Dugu Mi (獨孤密) served as a prefectural prefect, while his father Dugu Yun (獨孤雲) served as a deputy minister. Dugu Sun had at least one older brother, Dugu Hui (獨孤回), and at least two younger brothers, Dugu Chi (獨孤遲) and Dugu Xian (獨孤憲).

== As chancellor ==
As of late 903, Dugu Sun was serving as the minister of rites (禮部尚書, Libu Shangshu), when he was made the deputy minister of defence (兵部侍郎, Bingbu Shilang) and chancellor, with the designation of Tong Zhongshu Menxia Pingzhangshi (同中書門下平章事). Soon thereafter, in spring 904, the powerful warlord Zhu Quanzhong the military governor of Xuanwu Circuit, whose troops had the imperial Chang'an under control, accused the leading chancellor Cui Yin of crimes and had Cui killed, and then had his troops forcibly move then-reigning Emperor Zhaozong, the imperial officials, and the residents of Chang'an to Luoyang, to make Luoyang the new capital. As part of the reshuffling of the imperial government after Cui's death, Dugu was put in nominal command of half of the imperial guards (which had previously been all under Cui's command and which Cui was trying to rebuild to counter Zhu's army when Zhu preemptively killed him) and made the director of finances.

== Removal and death ==
Later in 904, Zhu assassinated Emperor Zhaozong and replaced him with his son Emperor Ai. At that time, Dugu and the other chancellors Pei Shu and Cui Yuan all were senior officials who came from aristocratic families, and they despised their colleague Liu Can for associating with Zhu. By spring 905, Pei had offended Zhu by refusing to commission another associate of Zhu's, Zhang Tingfan (張廷範), as the minister of worship (太常卿, Taichang Qing)—trying to deflect Zhu by stating that Zhang should serve as a military governor rather than be bothered with the responsibilities of minister of worship. Liu thus took the opportunity to accuse Cui and Dugu, as well as Pei, of disrespecting Zhu. Zhu thus had all three removed from chancellor positions; in Dugu's case, he was made the military governor of the remote Jinghai Circuit (靜海, headquartered in modern Hanoi, Vietnam).

With Zhu preparing to seize the throne, Liu and another associate of Zhu's, Li Zhen, argued for a general purge of high-level imperial officials who were from aristocratic families. Zhu agreed, and initially a large number of them were demoted and exiled—in Dugu's case, to be the prefect of Di Prefecture (棣州, in modern Binzhou, Shandong), and then to be the census officer of Qiong Prefecture. Soon thereafter, some 30 of these officials—including Dugu, Cui, Pei, fellow former chancellors Lu Yi, Wang Pu, and other officials Zhao Chong (趙崇) and Wang Zan (王贊)—were rounded up at Baima Station (白馬驛, in modern Anyang, Henan) and ordered to commit suicide. At Li Zhen's request (as Li Zhen, who was unable to pass the imperial examinations, resented these traditional aristocrats for claiming to be free from taint), Zhu had their bodies thrown into the Yellow River (as Li Zhen put it, to taint them).
