= Li Yu, Prince of De =

Imperial prince of Tang dynasty

Emperor of the Tang Dynasty
- Reign: December 4, 900 – January 24, 901
- Predecessor: Emperor Zhaozong
- Successor: Emperor Zhaozong

Crown Princee of the Tang Dynasty
- Reign: 897 - December 4, 900
- Born: unknown
- Died: March 17, 905
Full name
- Family name: Lǐ (李); Given name: Originally Yòu (祐), later Yù (裕) (changed 897), briefly Zhēn (縝) (900–901)
- Dynasty: Tang dynasty
- Father: Emperor Zhaozong
- Mother: Empress Xuanmu

Li Yu (李裕; died March 17, 905), né Li You (李祐; name changed 897), briefly Li Zhen (李縝; from 900 to 901), formally the Prince of De (德王), was an imperial prince of the Chinese Tang dynasty. He was the oldest son of the penultimate emperor Emperor Zhaozong and Empress He and was crown prince from 897 to 900. In 900, Emperor Zhaozong was briefly forced by the eunuch Liu Jishu to abdicate in Li Yu's favor; after Emperor Zhaozong was restored, Li Yu was no longer Crown Prince but remained a favored son. After Emperor Zhaozong was assassinated by the powerful warlord Zhu Quanzhong in 904, Li Yu, whom Zhu was apprehensive of, was bypassed in favor of his younger brother Emperor Ai (Li Zuo/Li Zhu), and in 905, Zhu had Li Yu, along with eight of his younger brothers, killed. As Li Yu's brief reign was under duress from a eunuch, he is not typically considered a true emperor of Tang.

== Background ==
It is not known when Li You was born—including whether he was born before or after his father Emperor Zhaozong became emperor in 888—but it would be before his younger brother Li Zuo was born in 892, particularly since both he and Li Zuo were born of Empress He. He was Emperor Zhaozong's oldest son. In 891, Emperor Zhaozong created him the Prince of De.

== As crown prince under Emperor Zhaozong ==
After Emperor Zhaozong and his court were forced to flee from the imperial capital Chang'an to Hua Prefecture (華州, headquartered in modern Weinan, Shaanxi) after an attack by the warlord Li Maozhen the military governor (jiedushi) of Fengxiang Circuit (鳳翔, headquartered in modern Baoji, Shaanxi) in 896, Emperor Zhaozong came under effective control of Han Jian the military governor of Zhenguo Circuit (鎮國, headquartered at Hua Prefecture). Han soon became apprehensive of the fact that Emperor Zhaozong arrived at Hua Prefecture along with a number of new imperial soldiers that Emperor Zhaozong had recruited and put under the commands of a number of imperial princes (who were not his sons), and he pressured Emperor Zhaozong to force the imperial princes to give up the commands. Under Han's duress, Emperor Zhaozong was forced to have the imperial princes give up the commands and subject to house arrest by Han. Han, knowing that this displeased Emperor Zhaozong, wanted to placate the emperor, so he suggested to the emperor that he create Li You crown prince. In spring 897, Emperor Zhaozong did so, and also changed Li You's name to Li Yu. Shortly after, Li Yu's mother Consort He was created empress. (Subsequently, when Han ascertained that if he acted against the imperial princes that he arrested that he would not face retaliation from Li Keyong the military governor of Hedong Circuit (河東, headquartered in modern Taiyuan, Shanxi), whom Emperor Zhaozong was still awaiting rescue from, Han slaughtered those imperial princes.)

== Briefly as emperor ==
Emperor Zhaozong subsequently made peace with Li Maozhen and returned to Chang'an in 899. It was said, however, that after the ordeal at Hua Prefecture, he became depressed, drank frequently, and had unpredictable moods. The powerful eunuchs (Liu Jishu and Wang Zhongxian (王仲先) the commanders of the Shence Armies and Wang Yanfan (王彥範) and Xue Qiwo (薛齊偓) the directors of palace communications) became considering deposing him. Late in 900, after an incident where Emperor Zhaozong personally killed a few eunuchs and ladies-in-waiting after being drunk, Liu acted. He took the Shence soldiers and entered the palace, forcing Emperor Zhaozong to turn over the imperial seal and putting the emperor under house arrest. He brought Li Yu to the palace and, issuing an edict in Emperor Zhaozong's name passing the throne to Li Yu, declared Li Yu emperor and changed his name to Li Zhen. Emperor Zhaozong was honored as Retired Emperor (Taishanghuang) while Empress He was honored as Retired Empress, but they were effectively kept under house arrest.

Less than two months later, a group of Shence officers loyal to Emperor Zhaozong (led by Sun Dezhao (孫德昭), Dong Yanbi (董彥弼), and Zhou Chenghui (周承誨)) killed Liu and Wang Zhongxian. They restored Emperor Zhaozong to the throne. A group of eunuchs, in the disturbance, escorted Li Zhen to the Left Shence Army. They offered the imperial seal back to Emperor Zhaozong. Emperor Zhaozong accepted it and stated that Li Yu was not responsible, since he was young. He returned Li Yu to the Crown Prince's palace, but still removed the title of Crown Prince from him and made him the Prince of De again.

== After Emperor Zhaozong's restoration ==
There was no reference to Li Yu's activities after becoming Prince of De again. Presumably, when Emperor Zhaozong was subsequently kidnapped by the eunuchs led by Han Quanhui to Fengxiang (as they were allied with Li Maozhen) in 901, Li Yu was taken to Fengxiang as well. At the instigation of the chancellor Cui Yin, Zhu Quanzhong the military governor of Xuanwu Circuit (宣武, headquartered in modern Kaifeng, Henan) took an army to Fengxiang, put its capital Fengxiang Municipality under siege, and forced Li Maozhen to surrender the emperor to him. He took the emperor and the imperial household back to Chang'an.

By this point, Li Yu was growing up and was said to be handsome. Zhu, who wanted to eventually take over the throne himself, was apprehensive of him, and stated to Cui that he believed that Li Yu, having taken the throne improperly earlier, should not be allowed to live. When Cui relayed this to Emperor Zhaozong, Emperor Zhaozong was shocked and confronted Zhu; Zhu then disavowed having told that to Cui. Subsequently, when Zhu had Cui killed and forced the emperor to relocate to Luoyang, which was firmly in his control, Emperor Zhaozong became fearful that Zhu wanted Li Yu killed, once stating to Zhu's assistant Jiang Xuanhui (蔣玄暉), whom Zhu made the director of palace communications to keep the emperor under watch, "The Prince of De is a beloved son of ours. Why does Quanzhong firmly want him dead?" Zhu became more apprehensive, and, in 904, he had his adoptive son Zhu Yougong (朱友恭) and officer Shi Shucong (氏叔琮) assassinate the emperor. Li Yu, even though he was the oldest son, was bypassed, and his younger brother Li Zuo, then the Prince of Hui, was made emperor (as Emperor Ai, with his name changed to Li Zhu).

In spring 905, at the She Festival (社日, i.e., the festival dedicated to the Tudi), Zhu had Jiang invite Li Yu and eight of his younger brothers to a feast at Jiuqu Pond (九曲池). At the feast, Zhu had the soldiers seize the imperial princes and strangle them to death. Their bodies were thrown into the pond.

== Notes and references ==
- Old Book of Tang, vol. 175.
- New Book of Tang, vol. 82.
- Zizhi Tongjian, vols. 258, 261, 262, 265.

Chinese nobility
Preceded by Emperor Zhaozong of Tang	Emperor of the Tang dynasty 900–901	Succeeded by Emperor Zhaozong of Tang
