= Liu Can (Tang dynasty) =

Chancellor during the reigns of Emperor Zhaozong of Tang and his son

Liu Can (柳璨; died January 27, 906), courtesy name Zhaozhi (炤之 or 昭之), formally the Baron of Hedong (河東男), nicknamed Liu Qiezi (柳篋子, "Liu the File Folder"), was an official of the Chinese Tang dynasty, serving as a chancellor during the reigns of Emperor Zhaozong and Emperor Zhaozong's son Emperor Ai, near the end of the dynasty.

He was an associate of warlord Zhu Quanzhong, the military governor (jiedushi) of Xuanwu Circuit (宣武, headquartered in modern Kaifeng, Henan). He assisted Zhu in the process of usurping the Li family to seize the Tang throne. However, eventually, Zhu became impatient of the pace that Liu and his other associates Jiang Xuanhui (蔣玄暉) and Zhang Tingfan (張廷範) were taking in that process and became suspicious that they had turned against him. Zhu then executed Liu Can and all his associates.

== Background ==
It is not known when Liu Can was born. His family claimed ancestry from the ruling house of the Spring and Autumn period state Lu — specifically, from the nobleman Liu Xiahui. The traceable ancestry of Liu Can's included officials of Northern Wei, the Sui dynasty, and the Tang dynasty. Liu Can's grandfather Liu Qi (柳器) was a cousin of the famed official and calligraphy Liu Gongquan, and his father was named Liu Zhongzun (柳仲遵); neither Liu Qi nor Liu Zhongzun were listed with any official titles. (Liu Can's biography in the Old Book of Tang gave alternative names of Liu Gongqi (柳公器) and Liu Zun (柳遵) for Liu Can's grandfather and father, respectively.) Liu Can had at least two younger brothers, Liu Yu (柳瑀) and Liu Jian (柳瑊).

Liu Can lost his father early, and, in his youth, was said to be poor but studious. For some time, he lived in a forest; during the day, he collected wood, while he studied at night using light from burning wood and leaves. It was said that he was straightforward in his personality, but this was looked down by his clansmen Liu Bi (柳璧) and Liu Ci (柳玼) (the grandsons of Liu Gongquan's brother Liu Gongchuo (柳公綽), himself a renowned official and general), who were prominent officials at the imperial court, and Liu Bi and Liu Ci did not even refer to him as a clansman.

== Early career ==
During the Guanghua era (898–901) of Emperor Zhaozong, Liu passed the imperial examinations in the Jinshi class. He was considered an expert on the history of the Han dynasty and particularly impressed the imperial official Yan Rao (顏蕘). When Yan was put in charge of the imperial history institute, he then invited Liu to serve as a scholar under him. Believing that the earlier Tang historian Liu Zhiji was overly critical of ancient Confucian classics and history texts, Liu Can wrote a 10-volume work criticism Liu Zhiji's work and entitled it, Liu's Commentary on History (柳氏釋史), and this work was much praised by scholars. The imperial officials, impressed with his writing style, often asked him to draft petitions for them, causing him to gain the nickname of "Liu the File Folder" (柳篋子).

Emperor Zhaozong favored those who wrote well, and he initially treated Li Xi well, eventually making Li a chancellor in 895; however, the warlords Li Maozhen, Wang Xingyu, and Han Jian attacked the imperial capital Chang'an later in the year, killing Li Xi and another chancellor, Wei Zhaodu. Emperor Zhaozong was much saddened by Li Xi's death, and often wanted to seek another scholar of similar talent to Li Xi. Someone recommended Liu for his literary talent; Emperor Zhaozong thus summoned Liu to his presence and was impressed when Liu was able to write poems to his request. He soon thereafter made Liu an imperial scholar (翰林學士, Hanlin Xueshi).

== As chancellor ==
In spring 904, at the demand of the powerful warlord Zhu Quanzhong the military governor of Xuanwu Circuit, whose troops then controlled Chang'an, the leading chancellor Cui Yin was put to death. The next day, Emperor Zhaozong, citing Liu's talent, made Liu a chancellor with the designation Tong Zhongshu Menxia Pingzhangshi (同中書門下平章事), even though Liu still, even after the chancellor commission, carried the relatively low position of You Jianyi Daifu (右諫議大夫), an advisor at the legislative bureau of government (中書省, Zhongshu Sheng), reflecting his lack of seniority. It was said that Liu's promotion to chancellorship after just less than four years of service in the imperial administration and was unprecedented in its quickness. He was therefore viewed lowly by his chancellor colleagues Pei Shu, Dugu Sun, and Cui Yuan, all of whom were senior officials.

Shortly thereafter, Zhu forced Emperor Zhaozong to move the capital to Luoyang. After the imperial court relocated to Luoyang, Zhu had even tighter control of the emperor, as all of the emperor's attendants and guards were Zhu's subordinates. Liu cultivated relationships with them, particularly with Jiang Xuanhui, whom Zhu made the director of palace communications, and Zhang Tingfan, whom Zhu put in charge of the imperial guards. Through them, he also established a close relationship with Zhu, and therefore became the most powerful chancellor at court. He was there made Zhongshu Shilang (中書侍郎), the deputy head of the legislative bureau, the acting director of taxation (Pan Hubu, 判戶部), and created the Baron of Hedong.

Later in the year, Zhu had Emperor Zhaozong assassinated and replaced with his son Emperor Ai. Liu continued to serve as chancellor. In 905, Zhu became unhappy with Pei, whom he had previously had a good relationship with, when Pei refused to approve a commission of Zhang as the minister of worship (太常卿, Taichang Qing). Liu took this opportunity to falsely accuse Pei, as well as Dugu and Cui, all of whom he resented for disrespecting him. As a result, all three were removed from their chancellorships.

At that time, Zhu was preparing to seize the throne himself, and there happened to be astrological signs that appeared to call for a slaughter. Both Liu and Zhu's close associate Li Zhen advocated slaughtering Tang officials who might oppose him. At their instigation, Zhu had Pei, Dugu, Cui, and some 30 other prominent Tang officials gathered at Baima Station (白馬驛, in modern Anyang, Henan) and ordered them to commit suicide. Their bodies were thrown into the Yellow River. It was said that Liu Can still had tens of officials on his list of executions, but fellow chancellor Zhang Wenwei persuaded him not to carry out those executions.

== Removal and death ==
Meanwhile, Liu Can, along with Jiang Xuanhui and Zhang Tingfan, were meeting daily, preparing for plans to transition from Tang to Zhu Quanzhong's new dynasty. Believing that historical traditions called for the gradual promotion of Zhu to greater and greater honors, until eventually he receives the imperial throne, they first had Emperor Ai issue an edict making Zhu the generalissimo over all circuits. Zhu, who wanted the transition to proceed even quicker, was incensed. Jiang's deputies Wang Yin (王殷) and Zhao Yinheng, who were jealous of Zhu's trust (up to that point) of Jiang, then falsely accused Jiang and Liu of planning to extend the Tang dynasty's life. In particular, they accused Jiang, Liu, and Zhang of meeting with Emperor Ai's mother (Emperor Zhaozong's wife) Empress Dowager He to plan for Tang's revival, and also Jiang of having an affair with Empress Dowager He. Zhu himself was also becoming tired of Liu's incessant executions of Tang officials. Zhu therefore had Jiang, Liu, and Zhang arrested. Jiang was executed immediately, with his body burned on the street; Empress Dowager He was also killed. Liu was initially demoted to be the prefect of Deng Prefecture (登州, in modern Yantai, Shandong). Soon thereafter, Liu and Zhang were also executed — Liu by decapitation, and Zhang by drawing and quartering. It was said that Liu, regretting his association with Zhu, yelled, as he was to be executed, "The treasonous Liu Can should die!" His brothers Liu Yu and Liu Jian were also killed.

== Notes and references ==
- Old Book of Tang, vol. 179.
- New Book of Tang, vol. 223, part 2.
- Zizhi Tongjian, vols. 264, 265.
