= Liu Jishu =

Liu Jishu (劉季述) (died January 24, 901) was a eunuch late in the Chinese Tang dynasty who, as a powerful commander of the Shence Armies, briefly deposed Emperor Zhaozong in 900 and replaced Emperor Zhaozong with Emperor Zhaozong's son Li Yu, Prince of De, but was soon killed in a countercoup, allowing Emperor Zhaozong to return to the throne.

== Background ==
It is not known when or where Liu Jishu was born. It was said that he was not a prominent eunuch early in his career, but was gradually promoted during the reigns of Emperor Xizong and Emperor Xizong's brother and successor Emperor Zhaozong, eventually becoming one of the directors of palace communications (Shumishi) and then one of the commanders (中尉) of the Shence Armies. However, the main sources on his rise — the New Book of Tang and the Zizhi Tongjian — disagree with each other (and somewhat internally) as to his career progression and actions. The Zizhi Tongjian referred to Liu Jishu as the commander of the Right Shence Army in 888, at the time of Emperor Xizong's death and Emperor Zhaozong's ascension to the throne (which was supported by Yang Fuguang), but then referred to him as acting director of palace communications in 897, further stating that he cooperated with the warlord Han Jian the military governor of Zhenguo Circuit (鎮國, headquartered in modern Weinan, Shaanxi) when Emperor Zhaozong was at Zhenguo's capital Hua Prefecture (華州) when Han, over Emperor Zhaozong's protest, killed 11 imperial princes whom Emperor Zhaozong had put in command of some of the imperial forces. Emperor Zhaozong was then at Hua Prefecture after fleeing the imperial capital Chang'an with his court after coming under attack by the warlord Li Maozhen the military governor of Fengxiang Circuit (鳳翔, headquartered in modern Baoji, Shaanxi). According to the New Book of Tang, however, it appeared that Liu was director of palace communications when Emperor Zhaozong, at the instigation of the chancellor Cui Yin, killed the commanders of the Shence Armies Zhu Daobi (朱道弼) and Jing Wuxiu (景務脩) in 900 and replaced them with Liu and Wang Zhongxian (王仲先) — whereas the Zizhi Tongjian referred to Zhu and Jing, at their deaths, as directors of palace communications. Regardless, it appeared that by late 900, when Emperor Zhaozong had returned to Chang'an after making peace with Li Maozhen, Liu and Wang were the commanders of the Shence Armies and in enmity with Cui over Cui's role in instigating Zhu's and Jing's deaths.

== Removal of Emperor Zhaozong ==
It was said that Emperor Zhaozong's mood became unpredictable and depressed after his return from Hua Prefecture, and he was often drunk. His attendants became fearful of him. Liu Jishu, in response, began plotting with Wang Zhongxian, as well as the directors of palace communications Wang Yanfan (王彥範) and Xue Qiwo (薛齊偓), to overthrow him and replace him with his son, the Crown Prince Li Yu, Prince of De.

The eunuchs' plot was put into action after, one night late in 900, Emperor Zhaozong, in a drunken rage, killed several eunuch attendants and ladies in waiting. Liu, hearing of the incident, went to confront Cui Yin the next morning, arguing that Emperor Zhaozong was no longer fit to be emperor. Cui, fearing that Liu would kill him, did not dare to openly oppose Liu. Liu drafted a petition that he then forced Cui and other imperial officials to sign, asking Emperor Zhaozong briefly transfer imperial authorities to the Crown Prince; he and Wang Zhongxian then took Shence Army soldiers to enter the palace to confront Emperor Zhaozong. Emperor Zhaozong initially resisted the eunuchs' attempt to remove him, but his wife Empress He, fearful that the eunuchs would kill him, persuaded him to yield to the eunuchs and turn the imperial seals over to them. Liu and Wang escorted Emperor Zhaozong to Shaoyang Pavilion (少陽院) and put him under house arrest here; Liu went as far as rebuking the emperor for not following his advice on many prior occasions, using a silver cane to draw lines on the ground to count off the times. He then had Li Yu escorted to the palace, had his name changed to Li Zhen, and declared him emperor. Emperor Zhaozong was declared Retired Emperor and Empress He Retired Empress.

With Liu in power, he executed Emperor Zhaozong's younger brother Li Yi (李倚) the Prince of Mu, as well as the attendants and Buddhist and Taoist monks that Emperor Zhaozong favored. He also considered killing Cui, but was fearful of a violent reaction by Cui's ally Zhu Quanzhong the military governor of Xuanwu Circuit (宣武, headquartered in modern Kaifeng, Henan), only removing Cui from his secondary post as director of the salt and iron monopolies.

Cui, meanwhile, was in secret communications with Zhu, thinking of ways to restore Emperor Zhaozong. Liu also tried to communicate with Zhu, sending his adoptive son Liu Xidu (劉希度) and another eunuch, Li Fengben (李奉本), to Xuanwu's capital Daliang, offering to let him take over the Tang throne. Zhu was initially unsure of what to do, but the advice of his staff member Li Zhen (not to be confused with the prince-emperor), Zhu put Liu Xidu and Li Fengben under arrest and sent his staff member Jiang Xuanhui (蔣玄暉) to Chang'an to confer with Cui.

Cui was, at the same time, trying to undermine the eunuchs by persuading Shence Army officers to turn against the eunuchs. He persuaded Sun Dezhao (孫德昭) to work with him to restore the emperor. Sun then persuaded fellow officers Dong Yanbi (董彥弼) and Zhou Chenghui (周承誨) to join the plot as well. On lunar new year's day in 901, Sun assassinated Wang Zhongxian and went to Shaoyang Pavilion to free Emperor Zhaozong and Empress He. Meanwhile, Zhou captured Liu and Wang Yanfan and took them to the emperor's presence. Before Emperor Zhaozong could interrogate them, however, Liu and Wang Yanfan were battered to death by the soldiers. Xue committed suicide by jumping into a well. The four eunuchs' family members were slaughtered.

== Notes and references ==
- Old Book of Tang, vol. 184.
- New Book of Tang, vol. 208.
- Zizhi Tongjian, vols. 257, 261, 262.
