= Han Quanhui =

Han Quanhui (韓全誨) (died February 6, 903) was a eunuch late in the Chinese Tang dynasty. The struggles by the eunuchs, led by him, against the chancellor Cui Yin, who wanted to eliminate the powerful eunuchs, led to the eunuchs' kidnapping of Emperor Zhaozong and then a major military confrontation between two powerful warlords — the eunuchs' ally Li Maozhen the military governor of Fengxiang Circuit (鳳翔, headquartered in modern Baoji, Shaanxi) and Cui's ally Zhu Quanzhong the military governor of Xuanwu Circuit (宣武, headquartered in modern Kaifeng, Henan). Eventually, Li, unable to stand up to Zhu's military pressure, surrendered the emperor to him and slaughtered Han and the other eunuchs. After this, Zhu was in firm control of the imperial court, leading to the dynasty's end four years later and its replacement by Zhu's Later Liang.

== Background ==
It is not known when Han Quanhui was born. It is known that at one point, both he and fellow eunuch Zhang Yanhong (張彥弘) served as monitors of the Fengxiang army, but Han was later recalled to the imperial capital Chang'an to serve as a director of the palace communications (Shumishi) and was serving in that post as of early 901, during the reign of Emperor Zhaozong.

Earlier (in late 900), Emperor Zhaozong had been briefly deposed and imprisoned by the eunuch commanders of the Shence Armies, Liu Jishu and Wang Zhongxian (王仲先) and the directors of palace communications Wang Yanfan (王彥範) and Xue Qiwo (薛齊偓), but was restored in early 901 in a countercoup led by the Shence Army officers Sun Dezhao (孫德昭), Dong Yanbi (董彥弼), and Zhou Chenghui (周承誨). (For their contributions, Sun, Dong, and Zhou were all bestowed the imperial surname of Li, and Sun and Zhou were given new names of Jizhao (繼昭) and Jihui (繼誨) respectively.) After the countercoup, the chancellor Cui Yin suggested transferring the command of the Shence Armies from eunuchs (which had traditionally been the case) to the chancellors — himself and Lu Yi — to permanently end the eunuchs' hold on the armies. When Emperor Zhaozong asked Li Jizhao, Li Jihui, and Li Yanbi for their opinions, however, they opposed. Emperor Zhaozong thereafter decided to put Han and Zhang in command of the Shence Armies. He initially tried to make the retired eunuch Yan Zunmei (嚴尊美) the overseer of both Shence Armies, but Yan declined. Cui, apprehensive of this development, secretly requested Fengxiang's military governor Li Maozhen, who was in Chang'an at that time to pay tribute to Emperor Zhaozong, to leave a detachment of 2,000 men at Chang'an, to counterbalance the Shence Armies. Li Maozhen agreed, and left his adoptive son Li Jiyun (李繼筠) in charge of the Fengxiang detachment.

== Kidnapping of Emperor Zhaozong ==
Meanwhile, Cui Yin tried to cut down on the independent financial resources of the Shence Armies by ending the yeast monopoly that the army (which included the Shence Armies) held and allowing the general population to sell yeast. This also ended the monopoly that the circuit armies held. Li Maozhen did not want to give up the Fengxiang army's hold on the yeast monopoly, and went to Chang'an to try to dissuade Emperor Zhaozong from implementing Cui's proposal. After Li Maozhen arrived at Chang'an to discuss this matter with Emperor Zhaozong, Han Quanhui did all he could to foster a relationship with Li Maozhen, and Cui, seeing this, began to fear a Han/Li Maozhen alliance. He thus strengthened his alliance with Zhu Quanzhong the military governor of Xuanwu Circuit.

Emperor Zhaozong had believed that after the countercoup that restored him to the throne, the eunuchs would be held in check in his restored administration. However, that turned out to be not the case — with Han and Zhang Yanhong in command of the Shence Armies, they got Li Jihui and Li Yanbi (who, along with Li Jizhao, received independent commands after the countercoup), in addition to Li Maozhen, on their side as well. Cui suggested to Emperor Zhaozong that all eunuchs be slaughtered and replaced with ladies in waiting. Emperor Zhaozong was initially resistant to the proposal, and the eunuchs eventually found out. Fearing that Emperor Zhaozong would eventually accept Cui's proposal, they had the Shence Army soldiers surround the palace and claim that Cui had been refusing to provide them with winter clothes. Emperor Zhaozong had to remove Cui from his secondary post as the director of salt and iron monopolies to placate the soldiers.

Cui became aware that the eunuchs knew of his proposal. Fearing that the eunuchs would attack and kill him, he wrote to Zhu, requesting that he bring an army to Chang'an to wipe out the eunuchs. After receiving the letter in fall 901, Zhu mobilized his troops and headed toward Chang'an. Han, hearing of Zhu's impending arrival, had Li Jihui and Li Yanbi take their soldiers to the palace to force Emperor Zhaozong and his household to head for Fengxiang. The imperial officials, led by Cui, remained at Chang'an, protected by Li Jizhao (who refused to side with the eunuchs). The eunuchs and their allies then took the emperor to Fengxiang after setting the palace on fire.

== At Fengxiang ==
Zhu Quanzhong quickly put Fengxiang's capital Fengxiang Municipality under siege, despite Han Quanhui's issuance of edicts in Emperor Zhaozong's name claiming that his visit to Fengxiang was a voluntary one and ordering him to return to Xuanwu. In addition, Zhu attacked Li Maozhen's other holdings in the Guanzhong region, gradually forcing them to surrender to him. Later in 901, Han sent eunuchs with edicts in Emperor Zhaozong's name, ordering the southeastern circuits to attack Zhu; those eunuchs were intercepted and killed by Feng Xingxi the military governor of Rongzhao Circuit (戎昭, headquartered in modern Ankang, Shaanxi) and never reached their destination. Li Maozhen sought aid from Wang Jian the military governor of Xichuan Circuit (西川, headquartered in modern Chengdu, Sichuan); Wang reacted by outwardly claiming to rebuke Zhu, but instead sending secret messengers to Zhu to encourage him to continue the campaign, while he himself attacked Li Maozhen's possessions south of the Qinling Mountains, taking them one by one.

By late 902, Fengxiang was in a dire strait — with Li Maozhen's Guanzhong possessions having fallen into Zhu's hands and southern possessions into Wang's hands, Fengxiang was running out of food, causing the people to resort to cannibalism. Li Maozhen began making secret overtures to Zhu, offering to kill the eunuchs and surrender the emperor to him while blaming Han for seizing the emperor. In spring 903, after Li Maozhen presented the proposal to Emperor Zhaozong, Emperor Zhaozong issued an order to have Han, Zhang Yanfan, the directors of palace communications Yuan Yijian (袁易簡) and Zhou Jingrong (周敬容), a group of other high-level eunuchs, Li Jihui, Li Yanbi, and Li Jiyun all executed. Their heads were presented to Zhu, who eventually agreed to peace with Li Maozhen.

== Notes and references ==
- New Book of Tang, vol. 208.
- Zizhi Tongjian, vols. 262, 263.
