= Luo Zhouhan =

Luo Zhouhan (Chinese: 羅周翰), formally the Duke of Changsha (長沙公), was a teenage general of the Chinese state Later Liang of the Five Dynasties and Ten Kingdoms period. He inherited Tianxiong Circuit (天雄, headquartered in modern Handan, Hebei) from his grandfather Luo Hongxin and father Luo Shaowei, who controlled Tianxiong in a semi-independent manner late in Later Liang's predecessor state Tang dynasty as military governor (Jiedushi). Luo Zhouhan, however, was in a position of weakness due to his young age after inheriting the circuit, and soon, the Later Liang general Yang Shihou, who had coveted Tianxiong, forcibly seized it. Luo was transferred to Xuanyi Circuit (宣義, headquartered in modern Anyang, Henan) and died there shortly after.

== Background ==
It is not known which year Luo Zhouhan was born — although, as referred to below, he died some time from 913 to 915 at the age of 13, so he must have been born sometime between 900 and 902. His grandfather Luo Hongxin had taken over Tianxiong Circuit, then also known as Weibo Circuit (魏博), late in the Tang dynasty after a successful rebellion against then-ruling military governor Le Yanzhen. His father Luo Shaowei would later inherit the circuit and become a reliable ally of the major warlord Zhu Quanzhong the military governor of Xuanwu Circuit (宣武, headquartered, in modern Kaifeng, Henan), allowing the Luo family to safely hold Tianxiong after Zhu seized the Tang throne and started a new Later Liang as its Emperor Taizu. Luo Zhouhan had one older brother, Luo Tinggui (羅廷規), who died early, and two younger brothers, Luo Zhoujing (羅周敬) and Luo Zhouyin (羅周胤).

In 909, Luo Shaowei, who then held the title of Prince of Ye, suffered a paralysis to his limb(s). He wrote Later Liang's Emperor Taizong, in an explicit offer to surrender physical control of the circuit:

Wei Prefecture is an important post, surrounded by enemies. Your Imperial Majesty should send an official with accomplishments here to defend it. I, your subject, seek to retire to my mansion.

Emperor Taizu was touched, and, while appreciative of Luo's offer, commissioned Luo Zhouhan as the deputy military governor and put Luo Zhouhan in temporary command, stating to Luo Shaowei's messenger:

Return with these words to your lord: Try to eat for me. If the unspeakable happens to him, I will return his loyalty by letting his descendants be honored for generations. I am putting Zhouhan in charge of the headquarters and hoping that he will recover soon.

Luo Shaowei did not recover, however, and died in 910. Emperor Taizu made Luo Zhouhan acting military governor, and full military governor in 911. Concerned that Luo Zhouhan was too young and his officers too independent to control against an attack by Later Liang's northern rival Jin, Emperor Taizu temporarily assigned the official Li Zhen to Tianxiong as its deputy military governor and also sent the officer Du Tingyin (杜廷隱) to Tianxiong's capital Wei Prefecture (魏州) to assist Luo and Li in defending the city.

== As military governor of Tianxiong and Xuanyi ==
As Wei Prefecture remained the most important city north of the Yellow River still in Later Liang hands against the expansion of Jin's prince Li Cunxu, the Later Liang major general Yang Shihou was eventually stationed there, too, to defend it. He was impressed by its wealth and wanted to take Tianxiong for himself, but was apprehensive of Emperor Taizu's strictness toward generals, and therefore did not dare to do so. In 912, however, Emperor Taizu was assassinated by his son Zhu Yougui the Prince of Ying, who then took the throne. Yang took this opportunity to take action. He summoned the Tianxiong officer Pan Yan (潘晏), who had been the key decision maker at Tianxiong headquarters due to Luo Zhouhan's youthfulness, and then killed Pan at the meeting. He then entered the headquarters and took over. Zhu Yougui, then new to the throne, did not dare to act against Yang, and instead made Yang the military governor of Tianxiong. Luo was moved to Xuanyi Circuit (which Yang had been the military governor of) to serve as its military governor.

Luo was said to have died shortly after while still serving as the military governor of Xuanyi — but the year was not completely clear. He was still alive in 913, when Zhu Yougui's younger brother Zhu Youzhen the Prince of Jun instigated a countercoup and took over the throne himself, because he married Zhu Zhen's daughter Princess Shouchun and was referred to in an edict later in 913 in which he was given, inter alia, the title of Fuma Duwei (駙馬都尉), a title common to princesses' husbands. However, he must die in 914, as the epitaph of his younger brother Luo Zhoujing indicted.

== Notes and references ==
- History of the Five Dynasties, vol. 14.
- New History of the Five Dynasties, vol. 39.
- Zizhi Tongjian, vols. 267, 268.
