= Ge Congzhou =

Ge Congzhou (Chinese: 葛從周) (died 916), courtesy name Tongmei (通美), formally the Prince of Chenliu (陳留王), was a general serving under Zhu Wen (Zhu Quanzhong) while Zhu Quanzhong was a warlord and military officer (Xuanwu jiedushi, seat in Bianzhou) late in the Tang dynasty. Ge's health problems later forced him into retirement, but he remained in honored status after Emperor Taizu established Later Liang.

== Background ==
It is not known when Ge Congzhou was born, but it is known that he was from Pu Prefecture (濮州, in modern Heze, Shandong). All that are recorded in traditional histories about his great-grandfather Ge Ruan (葛阮), grandfather Ge Yuxian (葛遇賢), and father Ge Jian (葛簡) are their names. It is said that Ge Congzhou, in his youth, was decisive and intelligent. At one point, he became a follower of the agrarian rebel Huang Chao and became a key officer in Huang's army during the time that Huang claimed the title of Emperor of Qi.

In 884, by which time Huang was near total defeat under attack by Tang forces, Huang was attacking a former subordinate who had turned Tang general — Zhu Quanzhong, then the military governor (jiedushi) of Xuanwu Circuit (宣武, headquartered, in modern Kaifeng, Henan), but was crushed by the joint forces of Zhu and Li Keyong the military governor of Hedong Circuit (河東, headquartered in modern Taiyuan, Shanxi). In the aftermaths of the defeat, Ge, along with other Qi officers Li Dang (李讜), Huo Cun (霍存), Zhang Guiba (張歸霸), and Zhang's brother Zhang Guihou (張歸厚), surrendered to Zhu and became officers in his army. (Allies this time, Zhu and Li Keyong would soon turn mortal enemies after a failed attempt by Zhu to assassinate Li Keyong after Li Keyong insulted him.)

Ge apparently did not initially achieve a high position in the Xuanwu army. However, later that year, when Zhu was engaging Qin Zongquan — a former Tang military governor of Fengguo Circuit (奉國, headquartered in modern Zhumadian, Henan) who had turned against Tang and was pillaging nearby circuits — Zhu became trapped after his horse fell with Qin's soldiers pursuing him. Ge helped Zhu back onto a horse, while he himself battled the soldiers chasing Zhu. He suffered wounds to his face, his hips were hit by arrows, and he was speared several times, but he fought Qin's soldiers off and saved Zhu's life. Subsequently, both he and Zhu were saved by the officer Zhang Yanshou (張延壽). As a result of the battle, Zhu demoted a number of officers but promoted both Ge and Zhang.

== Campaigns under Zhu Quanzhong in late Tang times ==
In 887, when Zhu Quanzhong decided to turn against his former allies Zhu Xuan the military governor of Tianping Circuit (天平, headquartered in modern Tai'an, Shandong) and Zhu Jin the military governor of Taining Circuit (泰寧, headquartered in modern Jining, Shandong) (who were cousins to each other), he sent Zhu Zhen (朱珍) and Ge Congzhou to attack Tianping's Cao Prefecture (曹州, in modern Heze); they captured it and killed the prefect Qiu Hongli (丘弘禮). They then engaged Zhu Xuan and Zhu Jin at Pu Prefecture, defeating Zhu Xuan and Zhu Jin, who fled barely alive. This started a war between Zhu Quanzhong and the Zhu cousins.

In spring 888, when Qin Zongquan sent his general Shi Fan (石璠) to pillage Chen (陳州, in modern Zhumadian) and Bo (亳州, in modern Bozhou, Anhui), Zhu Quanzhong sent Zhu Zhen and Ge to engage him; they defeated and captured him.

Later in spring 888, when Zhang Quanyi, the mayor of Henan Municipality (河南, i.e., the Luoyang region), turned against Li Hanzhi the military governor of Heyang Circuit (河陽, headquartered in modern Jiaozuo, Henan) and seized control of Heyang, Li Hanzhi sought aid from Li Keyong, who sent Kang Junli, commanding Li Cunxiao, Xue Atan (薛阿檀), Shi Yan (史儼), An Quanjun (安全俊), and An Xiuxiu (安休休), to siege Heyang Circuit's capital Heyang. Zhang sought aid from Zhu Quanzhong, who sent Ding Hui, Ge, and Niu Cunjie (牛存節) to aid Zhang. The Xuanwu forces defeated the Hedong forces, causing An Xiuxiu to fear punishment and desert the Hedong forces. With the Xuanwu forces posturing to cut off the Hedong forces' return path to Hedong, Kang abandoned the campaign and returned to Hedong, allowing Zhang to retain control of Heyang.

In 890, when then-reigning Emperor Zhaozong declared a general campaign against Li Keyong, under the command of the chancellor Zhang Jun, Zhu was one of the warlords that the imperial government relied to fight Hedong forces from the east side. After the campaign was launched, Li Keyong's brother Li Kegong (李克恭) the military governor of Zhaoyi Circuit (昭義, headquartered in modern Changzhi, Shanxi) was assassinated in a mutiny, and his officer Feng Ba (馮霸) seized control of the circuit, claiming the title of acting military governor. Subsequently, the imperial government named Zhang's deputy, the imperial official Sun Kui (孫揆), military governor of Zhaoyi. Hedong forces subsequently put Zhaoyi's capital Lu Prefecture (潞州) under siege. Zhu, hearing the news, sent Ge to Lu Prefecture to help Feng defend against the Hedong forces' siege, while fellow Xuanwu officers Li Dang and Li Chongyin (李重胤) put Ze Prefecture (澤州, in modern Jincheng, Shanxi), where Li Hanzhi was, under siege. However, Li Keyong's adoptive son Li Cunxiao then captured Sun in a surprise attack as Sun was heading to Lu, and then defeated Li Dang and Li Chongyin, forcing them to withdraw. Hearing of Li Dang and Li Chongyin's defeat, Ge also withdrew, allowing Hedong forces to retake Zhaoyi. Zhu executed Li Dang and Li Chongyin in light of the defeat, but there was no record of his punishing Ge. With the Xuanwu forces largely withdrawn from the campaign, Li Keyong subsequently defeated Zhang Jun, forcing the imperial government to end the campaign against him.

In late 890, Zhu requested permission from Luo Hongxin the military governor of Weibo Circuit (魏博, headquartered in modern Handan, Hebei) to allow his forces through Weibo to attack Hedong and to contribute food and horses to the effort. Luo refused. Zhu thereafter sent Ding and Ge to attack Weibo. They took several Weibo cities quickly, and Zhu himself followed up with a larger force and defeated Luo in several battles. Luo, in fear, submitted a tribute and sought peace. Zhu agreed to peace, and thereafter Weibo became a vassal to Zhu.

In late 893, Zhu Quanzhong sent Ge to attack Zhu Wei (朱威) the prefect of Qi Prefecture (齊州, in modern Jinan, Shandong), which belonged to Tianping. Zhu Xuan and Zhu Jin arrived to try to save Zhu Wei. Zhu Quanzhong himself arrived thereafter and defeated Zhu Xuan and Zhu Jin.

In late 895, Zhu Quanzhong sent Ge to attack Zhu Jin's capital Yan Prefecture (兗州), and he himself followed and put Yan under siege. Zhu Quanzhong soon thereafter left Yan and left Ge in charge of the siege. Zhu Jin initially defended the city and refused to engage Ge, so Ge spread rumors that relief forces from Hedong and Tianping were arriving and that he was going to engage them. Hearing the news, Zhu Jin, believing that Ge's elite forces would have left to fight Hedong and Tianping forces, attacked Ge's siege camp at night. Ge surprised him and defeated him, capturing his officer Sun Hanyun (孫漢筠). Ge, however, subsequently ended the siege of Yan and returned to Xuanwu.

In summer 896, Ge was apparently attacking Tianping's capital Yun Prefecture (鄆州) when Li Keyong, whose request to Luo to allow his forces through to relieve Tianping and Taining was rebuffed, attacked Weibo. Luo sought aid from Zhu Quanzhong, and Zhu recalled Ge from Yun to aid Weibo. Ge dug many pits on the battlefield and, as the armies engaged, Li Keyong's son Li Luoluo (李落落) fell into one of the pits along with his horse. When Li Keyong tried to personally save Li Luoluo, he also fell into a pit and was nearly captured by the Xuanwu/Weibo forces. Li Luoluo, however, was captured. Li Keyong offered to ransom Li Luoluo, but Zhu instead delivered Li Luoluo to Luo, who executed him. Li Keyong, after the defeat, was forced to withdraw, leaving Tianping and Taining without hope of aid from him. Ge thereafter returned to Yun and continued his siege against Yun.

In fall 896, Li Keyong again sent Li Cunxin to attack Weibo. After Li Cunxin initially defeated Ge, Li Keyong himself advanced to Weibo as well, but after Zhu Quanzhong himself mobilized his main forces and headed for Weibo as well, Li Keyong withdrew.

After Li Keyong's withdrawal, Zhu again sent Pang Shigu (龐師古) and Ge to attack Yun. In spring 897, Yun's defenses failed, and Zhu Xuan fled, but were captured by the people in the countryside and offered to Ge. Ge delivered him to Zhu Quanzhong, who executed him. Meanwhile, Zhu Jin was running low on food supplies himself, so left his officer Kang Huaizhen (康懷貞) in defense of Yan and went to pillage Xu Prefecture (徐州, in modern Xuzhou, Jiangsu) with the Hedong officers Shi Yan and Li Chengsi (李承嗣), whom Li Keyong had sent to aid him before the Weibo path was cut off. Hearing that Zhu Jin was not at Yan, Zhu Quanzhong sent Ge to attack Yan, and Kang surrendered. Zhu Jin tried to counterattack but was repelled, and therefore fled to Huainan Circuit (淮南, headquartered in modern Yangzhou, Yangzhou) with Shi and Li Chengsi to submit to Huainan's military governor Yang Xingmi. Zhu thereafter made Ge the acting military governor of Taining.

Having seized Tianping and Taining, Zhu Quanzhong turned his attention against Huainan in fall 897. He gathered his available forces and sent Pang with 70,000 soldiers from Xuanwu and Ganhua (感化, headquartered in modern Xuzhou) Circuits to Qingkou (清口, in modern Huai'an, Jiangsu), posturing to head toward Huainan's capital Yang Prefecture (揚州); Ge with the forces from Tianping and Taining Circuits to Anfeng (安豐, in modern Lu'an, Anhui), posturing to head to Shou Prefecture (壽州, in modern Lu'an); and Zhu Quanzhong himself with his main forces to Su Prefecture (宿州, in modern Suzhou, Anhui). The people of Huainan Circuit was greatly shocked and dismayed by Zhu's forces. However, Pang, because he had such an impressive force, underestimated Yang Xingmi's army. Yang Xingmi had Zhu Jin serve as his advance commander, and Zhu constructed a dam on the Huai River. When Yang Xingmi attacked Pang, Zhu released the waters to flood Pang's army, and then attacked Pang with Yang. Pang's army was crushed by the waters and the Huainan forces, and Pang was killed. Yang's officer Zhu Yanshou also defeated Ge's army. Hearing that both of his generals had been defeated, Zhu Quanzhong also retreated. The Battle of Qingkou thus affirmed Yang's control of the territory between the Huai and the Yangtze Rivers.

In 898, Zhu Quanzhong sent Ge to attack Xingming Circuit (邢洺, headquartered in modern Xingtai, Hebei), then under Li Keyong's control. Ge quickly captured Ming Prefecture (洺州, in modern Handan) and killed its prefect Xing Shanyi (邢善益). He then attacked Xing Prefecture (邢州, in modern Xingtai), and its prefect Ma Shisu (馬師素) fled. The prefect of Ci Prefecture (磁州, in modern Handan), Yuan Fengtao (袁奉韜) then committed suicide, allowing Zhu to take over the circuit. Zhu gave Ge the title of acting military governor of Zhaoyi (as these three prefectures of Xingming were originally part of Zhaoyi) and left him in charge of the three prefectures. In winter 898, when Li Keyong sent his nephew Li Sizhao and officer Zhou Dewei to try to recapture the three prefectures, Ge defeated them, although his attempt to cut off their escape path and annihilate them was thwarted by Li Keyong's adoptive son Li Siyuan, although his grasp on the three prefectures was affirmed.

In spring 899, Liu Rengong the military governor of Lulong Circuit (盧龍, headquartered in modern Beijing) launched a major attack on Weibo, and Luo Hongxin's son and successor Luo Shaowei sought aid from Xuanwu. Ge and He Delun (賀德倫), an officer from Xuanyi Circuit (宣義, headquartered in modern Anyang, Henan), which was also under Zhu's control, joined with Weibo forces to engage the Lulong forces, defeating them decisively — such that it was said that Liu no longer had the strength thereafter to reattempt the attack on Weibo, and Zhu's hegemony over the region was affirmed. Ge thereafter made an attempt to advance into Hedong, but soon thereafter, when Li Hanzhi seized Lu Prefecture and submitted to Zhu, and then suffered a major illness, Zhu sent Ge to take over Lu, while replacing him at Xing with Zhang Guiba. Zhu subsequently recalled Ge and replaced him with He Delun; after He Delun was soon thereafter defeated by Li Sizhao, however, he abandoned Lu, allowing Hedong forces to retain control of Lu.

In summer 900, Zhu sent Ge, commanding forces from Xuanwu, Tianping, Xuanyi, and Weibo, to attack Liu Rengong's son Liu Shouwen the military governor of Yichang Circuit (義昌, headquartered in modern Cangzhou, Hebei). Ge quickly captured Yichang's De Prefecture (德州, in modern Dezhou, Shandong) and killed its prefect Fu Gonghe (傅公和). He then put Liu Shouwen under siege at Yichang's capital Cang Prefecture (滄州). When Liu Rengong himself tried to come to Liu Shouwen's aid, Ge left Zhang Cunjing (張存敬) and Shi Shucong (氏叔琮) in charge of the siege and engaged Liu Rengong himself, defeating Liu Rengong. Wang Rong the military governor of Chengde Circuit (成德, headquartered in modern Shijiazhuang, Hebei) then tried to mediate, and with Ge's army running into unfavorable weather, Zhu recalled Ge.

Meanwhile, Li Keyong tried to aid Liu Rengong and Liu Shouwen by having Li Sizhao attack Ming Prefecture to divert Zhu's forces. He was able to capture Ming, but Ge then engaged and defeated him, forcing him to withdraw. After this victory, Zhu made Ge the military governor of Taining.

In spring 901, with Li Keyong's strength dwindling, Zhu launched a major six-pronged attack on Hedong's capital Taiyuan — with Weibo officer Zhang Wengong (張文恭) attacking through Xinkou (新口, in modern Handan); Ge, commanding Taining and Tianping forces, along with supplements from Chengde (which had become a Zhu vassal by that point as well) attacking through Tumen (土門, in modern Shijiazhuang); Zhang Guihou (張歸厚) attacking through Maling (馬嶺, in modern Xingtai); Wang Chuzhi the military governor of Yiwu Circuit (義武, headquartered in modern Baoding, Hebei) through Feihu (飛狐, in modern Zhangjiakou, Hebei); Hou Yan (侯言) through Yindi (陰地, in modern Jinzhong, Shanxi); and Shi Shucong commanding the main forces through Tianjing Pass (天井關, in modern Jincheng). Hedong's border defenses largely failed, and the six commanders converged at Taiyuan and put it under siege. However, after the combined forces suffered some losses in skirmishes and suffered from the lack of food supplies and illnesses, Zhu ordered a withdrawal.

It was soon after this withdrew that Ge became chronically ill. In 903, when Zhu Quanzhong was attacking Li Maozhen the military governor of Fengxiang Circuit (鳳翔, headquartered in modern Baoji, Shaanxi) — under the declared rationale of rescuing Emperor Zhaozong, whom the eunuch Han Quanhui had forcibly taken to Fengxiang — Han and the other eunuchs issued an edict in Emperor Zhaozong's name ordering the other circuits to rise against Zhu. When Wang Shifan the military governor of Pinglu Circuit (平盧, headquartered in modern Weifang, Shandong), a long-time Zhu vassal, received the edict, he decided to do so, and he sent many of his officers, disguised as merchants, to a number of circuits, hoping to surprise Zhu's garrisons at those circuits and take them over by surprise. However, most of these Pinglu officers were discovered, with the only successful one being Liu Xun, who was able to seize Yan, with Ge away at that time at Ming. Liu Xun decided to try not to alienate Ge, and he did so by treating Ge's mother and wife with respect, and allowing Ge's family members to remain in the posts that they were in at Yan. Subsequently, hearing what happened, Zhu's nephew Zhu Youning (朱友寧), whom he had left in charge at Xuanwu's capital Bian Prefecture, recalled Ge and jointly attacked Pinglu with Ge. Ge subsequently put Yan under siege, but with Liu treating his family well, Ge did not dare to attack with great fervor. After Wang suffered repeated defeats and decided to resubmit to Zhu, however, Liu surrendered to Ge. Ge treated him well and sent Liu to Bian to meet with Zhu; Zhu, impressed by how Liu had taken Yan, made Liu a major general.

Meanwhile, Ge continued to suffer from his illness, so Zhu decided to relieve him of his command at Taining; Zhu replaced him with Kang Huaizhen.

== Retirement ==
After Ge Congzhou was relieved of his command at Taining, there was no further record of his being involved in a campaign. After Zhu Quanzhong seized the throne in 907 and established Later Liang as its Emperor Taizu, he gave Ge a major general title and had Ge retire to Yanshi (偃師, in modern Luoyang). After Emperor Taizu was assassinated in 912 and subsequently succeeded by his son Zhu Youzhen, Ge was given the title of military governor of Zhaoyi (an honorary title, as Zhaoyi was then under the control of Jin (which was then ruled by Li Keyong's son and successor Li Cunxu the Prince of Jin)) and created the Prince of Chenliu, but he remained in retirement at home. Ge died in 916 and was given posthumous honors.

== Notes ==
- History of the Five Dynasties, vol. 16.
- New History of the Five Dynasties, vol. 21.
- Zizhi Tongjian, vols. 255, 257, 258, 259, 260, 261, 262, 263, 264.
