= Battle of Qingkou =

897 battle

Date	29 November 897
Location	Qingkou
Result	Yang Xingmi victory

Belligerents
Zhu Quanzhong	Yang Xingmi

Commanders and leaders
Pang Shigu †	Yang Xingmi; Zhu Jin

Strength
50,000–70,000	Unknown, smaller

Casualties and losses
Majority of army	Minimal

The Battle of Qingkou (清口之戰) was fought in 897, during the period of constant warfare in China that preceded the collapse of the Tang dynasty. The battle was fought between armies loyal to the warlords Zhu Quanzhong (Zhu Wen) and Yang Xingmi, with Yang's army gaining victory.

== Background ==
Starting with the reign of Emperor Muzong, the Tang dynasty of China began to decline. Regional military governors (jiedushi) began to gain more autonomy from the imperial government and eunuchs within the Tang court began to exercise more control over the emperor, especially after the Sweet Dew incident of 835. This meant the government was ineffective and local peasants began to get angry. In the year 874, following major floods in which there was very little government response, mass rebellions occurred throughout Tang China. The most successful of these rebellions was led by Huang Chao, who captured the capital and declared himself emperor in 881. Huang was eventually defeated but the imperial government had lost all remaining power. Many jiedushi had already warred against each other before, but now all of them fought constantly, sending Tang China into chaos.

== Prelude ==
It was at this time the warlord Zhu Quanzhong began to gain power. Previously, he had served as a major officer under Huang Chao; however, he defected to the Tang and was given command of Xuanwu circuit. From there, he took over several more circuits, and also defeated Qin Zongquan, who had become leader of Huang's rebellion after the latter's death. This made him very popular with the Tang court so when Gao Pian, governor of Huainan, died in 887, Emperor Xizong granted Zhu Quanzhong control of the circuit. However, one of Gao Pian's generals, Yang Xingmi, took over the circuit and refused to submit to Zhu Quanzhong. Zhu was involved with other wars, and so Yang was able to get away with this without any reaction from Zhu. However, in the following years, Zhu began to win all his wars and became one of the most powerful jiedushi within China. In early 897, Zhu defeated his longtime enemies, the cousins Zhu Xuan and Zhu Jin, subsequently seizing all their territory. Zhu Xuan was captured and executed; however, Zhu Jin and the remainder of his and Zhu Xuan's armies fled to Yang Xingmi. Yang Xingmi's armies were inexperienced in land warfare, and so he welcomed the trained soldiers with open arms. However, Zhu Quanzhong was extremely angered by this and resolved to finally conquer Huainan.

== Battle ==
In late 897, Zhu sent a massive army numbering between 50 and 70 thousand men led by the general Pang Shigu to capture Huainan's capital Yang prefecture, with Zhu and another general called Ge Congzhou also leading smaller armies to other parts of Yang's territory. The size of Yang's force is unknown but he wouldn't have been able to field nearly as many as Zhu had. However, Yang had some advantages. Pang Shigu was made so overconfident by his numbers that he failed to look out for any threats. This allowed Yang to send his vanguard under Zhu Jin (who was now serving as general to Yang) to dam the Huai River. When Pang began to cross the river at a place called Qingkou, Zhu Jin broke the dam and a wave of water flooded over Pang's army, killing many. The disorganised army was then attacked on two sides by Yang and Zhu Jin and nearly the full army was killed, including Pang himself. Ge Congzhou was also defeated and Zhu Quanzhong retreated upon hearing of the annihilation of his army.

== Aftermath ==
While this battle didn't end the conflict between the warlords, Zhu wouldn't launch as large of a campaign against Yang again and the war became a stalemate. Zhu's expansion south was stopped, but he continued to grow in power in other areas, overthrowing the Tang and declaring himself the emperor of the new Later Liang Dynasty, beginning the Five Dynasties and Ten Kingdoms Period. Yang Xingmi's son and successor, Yang Wo, didn't accept this, becoming ruler of the independent Yang Wu Kingdom, which the later Liang and its successors never gained control of, in large part thanks to the Battle of Qingkou. The independence of Yang Wo also allowed other states in the south to further assert their independence from the northern dynasties.
