= Luo Hongxin =

Luo Hongxin (Chinese: 羅弘信) (836-898), courtesy name Defu (德孚), formally Prince Zhuangsu of Beiping (北平莊肅王), was a warlord in the late Tang dynasty, who controlled Weibo Circuit (魏博, headquartered in modern Handan, Hebei) as its military governor (Jiedushi) after seizing control in 888 after taking advantage of the soldiers' discontent with the prior military governor Le Yanzhen and Le's son Le Congxun (樂從訓). He started a three-generation control by his family over Weibo (with his son Luo Shaowei and grandson Luo Zhouhan), spanning into the post-Tang Later Liang.

== Background ==
Luo Hongxin was from Guixiang (貴鄉), one of the two counties making up the main city of Weibo Circuit's capital Wei Prefecture (魏州). His great-grandfather Luo Xiu (羅秀), grandfather Luo Zhen (羅珍), and father Luo Rang (羅讓) all served as officers at Weibo Circuit. Luo Hongxin himself did so as well from his youth, and he successively served under the military governors Han Jian and Le Yanzhen.

== Takeover of Weibo Circuit ==
As of spring 888, a tension had developed between the elite headquarters guard corps and Le Yanzhen, over attempts by Le Yanzhen's son Le Congxun to recruit troops to replace the critical role that the headquarters guards played in Weibo's military. At one point, Le Congxun became so fearful of the headquarters guards that he fled from Wei Prefecture; Le Yanzhen subsequently made him the prefect of nearby Xiang Prefecture (in modern Handan) and allowed him to retrieve armors and weapons from Wei Prefecture to equip his own army, which made the headquarters guards even more apprehensive.

Le Yanzhen, sensing the tension and fearing that the headquarters guards were about to mutiny, tried to avoid the mutiny by resigning and becoming a Buddhist monk. The headquarters guards supported the officer Zhao Wenbian (趙文㺹) as acting military governor. Le Congxun, however, had amassed 30,000 troops by this point and tried to contest this succession by marching on Wei Prefecture. Zhao refused to engage Le Congxun in battle, and the soldiers killed him. With there having been a rumor spread around that a god had foretold that Luo would be the new military governor, Luo stepped forward to take the leadership role. He engaged Le Congxun and defeated Le Congxun. Le Congxun withdrew to Neihuang (內黃, in modern Anyang, Henan). Luo put Neihuang under siege.

Le Yanzhen and nearby warlord Zhu Quanzhong the military governor of Xuanwu Circuit (宣武, headquartered in modern Kaifeng, Henan) had been friendly with each other, however, and during the disturbance the Weibo soldiers killed Zhu's emissary Lei Ye (雷鄴). Le Congxun thus sought aid from Zhu. Zhu sent his officer Zhu Zhen (朱珍) north, capturing three Weibo cities and advancing to Neihuang, where he initially defeated Weibo forces. However, when Le Congxun subsequently tried to fight out of the siege, Luo's officer Cheng Gongxin (程公信) attacked and killed him. Subsequently, Le Yanzhen was also executed, and both his head and his son's were publicly displayed on the gate to the Weibo camp. Luo subsequently sent messengers to apologize to Zhu Quanzhong and offer him gifts, so Zhu Quanzhong withdrew his forces, allowing Luo to take over Weibo without further opposition. Then-reigning Emperor Zhaozong issued an edict making Luo acting military governor.

== Early rule ==
Later in 888, Emperor Zhaozong made Luo Hongxin full military governor of Weibo, and created him the Duke of Yuzhang in 889. Emperor Zhaozong also bestowed on him the honorary titles of acting Sikong (司空, one of the Three Excellencies) and chancellor (同中書門下平章事, Tong Zhongshu Menxia Pingzhangshi).

At that time, Luo's Weibo Circuit sat between the regions of control by the major warlords Zhu Quanzhong the military governor of Xuanwu Circuit (宣武, headquartered in modern Kaifeng, Henan) and Li Keyong the military governor of Hedong Circuit (河東, headquartered in modern Taiyuan, Shanxi), who had a heated rivalry with each other. Luo appeared to initially try to stay out of the fray in the rivalry between Zhu and Li. For example, in 889, when Li attacked Meng Fangli the military governor of the eastern half of Zhaoyi Circuit (昭義), who was then at Xing Prefecture (邢州, in modern Xingtai, Hebei), causing Meng to commit suicide in distress, Meng's brother and temporary successor Meng Qian (孟遷) sought aid from Zhu. When Zhu sought permission to send relief troops through Weibo territory, however, Luo denied permission, causing Zhu to be able to send only a small contingent to aid Meng Qian; Meng Qian eventually was forced to surrender to Li. However, in 890, after Luo again denied Zhu permission to mount an offensive against Hedong through his territory, Zhu attacked Weibo, and after five defeats at Zhu's hand in spring 891, Luo sued for peace, and thereafter he was submissive to Zhu.

== Late rule ==
However, Luo Hongxin, even though he submitted to Xuanwu, did not break off his relations with Hedong initially. For example, in 894, when Li Keyong's allies Zhu Xuan the military governor of Tianping Circuit (天平, headquartered in modern Tai'an, Shandong) and Zhu Xuan's cousin Zhu Jin the military governor of Taining Circuit (泰寧, headquartered in modern Jining, Shandong) were under Xuanwu attack and sought aid from Li, Li obtained permission from Luo to send relief troops through Weibo (commanded by his officer An Fushun (安福順)) and again did so in 895 (commanded by his officers Li Chengsi (李承嗣) and Shi Yan (史儼)).

In 896, Li Keyong again sent relief troops for Tianping and Taining through Weibo, commanded by his adoptive son Li Cunxin, initially with Luo's permission. However, Zhu Quanzhong wrote Luo to warn him that Li Keyong had the ambition of ruling all of the territory north of the Yellow River and that he believed that Li Cunxin was intending an attack once the Tianping/Taining campaign was over. Further, Li Cunxin aggravated Luo by pillaging Weibo's countryside. Luo, in anger, ambushed Li Cunxin's troops in the night, forcing him to flee. (This was considered the turning point in Zhu Quanzhong's campaign against Zhu Xuan and Zhu Jin, as from this point Li Keyong was no longer able to aid Zhu Xuan and Zhu Jin through Weibo territory. Zhu Quanzhong further cemented his relationship with Luo by respectfully referring to Luo, as if he were an older brother.)

Later in 896, Li Keyong launched a major attack on Weibo and was initially successful in defeating Weibo troops and reaching Wei Prefecture. However, Zhu Quanzhong sent his general Ge Congzhou to aid Weibo, and defeated Li Keyong in battle, capturing Li Keyong's son Li Luoluo (李落落) and nearly capturing Li Keyong himself. When Li Keyong sought to ransom Li Luoluo from Zhu Quanzhong, Zhu Quanzhong instead gave Li Luoluo to Luo and had Luo execute Li Luoluo, to further complete the break between Weibo and Hedong. After Li Luoluo's death, Li Keyong withdrew. Another subsequent attack by Li Keyong in winter 896 also ended in failure, with Luo aided by Zhu Quanzhong, and Li Keyong ended all attempts to go through Weibo territory after Tianping and Taining fell to Xuanwu troops in spring 897.

In 898, Zhu Quanzhong, with aid from Weibo, attacked the three prefectures of Zhaoyi Circuit east of the Taihang Mountains that Li Keyong still held. The Xuanwu/Weibo troops quickly achieved victory and captured those prefectures, removing Li Keyong's remaining military presence east of the Taihang. At some point, Luo was created the Prince of Linqing.

Later in 898, Luo died. The Weibo soldiers supported his son Luo Shaowei as acting military governor, and this was later confirmed by Emperor Zhaozong. Luo Hongxin was posthumously honored and created the Prince of Beiping.

== Notes and references ==
- Old Book of Tang, vol. 181.
- New Book of Tang, vol. 210.
- Zizhi Tongjian, vols. 257, 258, 259, 260, 261.
