= Li Sizhao =

Chinese military general and politician

- Chinese: 李嗣昭
Transcriptions
Standard Mandarin
- Hanyu Pinyin: Lǐ Sìzhāo

Han
- Traditional Chinese: 韓
- Simplified Chinese: 韩
Transcriptions
Standard Mandarin
- Hanyu Pinyin: Hán

Li Jintong
- Traditional Chinese: 李進通
- Simplified Chinese: 李进通
Transcriptions
Standard Mandarin
- Hanyu Pinyin: Lǐ Jìntōng

Yiguang
- Chinese: 益光
Transcriptions
Standard Mandarin
- Hanyu Pinyin: Yìguāng

Prince of Longxi
- Traditional Chinese: 隴西王
- Simplified Chinese: 陇西王
Transcriptions
Standard Mandarin
- Hanyu Pinyin: Lǒngxī Wáng

Li Sizhao (Chinese: 李嗣昭) (died May 23, 922), né Han (韓), known at one point as Li Jintong (李進通), courtesy name Yiguang (益光), formally the Prince of Longxi (隴西王), was a Chinese military general and politician. He served as major general under Li Keyong and Li Keyong's son and successor Li Cunxu, the princes of the Chinese Five Dynasties and Ten Kingdoms period state Jin. He was an adoptive nephew of Li Keyong's, and served Li Keyong both before and after the destruction of the Tang dynasty.

== Background ==
It is not known when Li Sizhao was born. He was originally a son of a family named Han in Taigu (太谷, in modern Jinzhong, Shanxi). When he had just been born, the warlord Li Keyong the military governor of Hedong Circuit (河東, headquartered in modern Taiyuan, Shanxi), which included the area, happened to be on a hunt and went near the house. Believing that the house was exuding an unusual aura, he conversed with Li Sizhao's father, who indicated that he had just had a son. Li Keyong purchased the infant by giving his father gold and silk, and took the infant back. He gave the child to his younger brother Li Kerou (李克柔), who adopted the child as a son. Li Sizhao's original personal name was Jintong, but was later changed to Sizhao. As he grew, he became a brave soldier even though he had a diminutive stature. He initially favored drinking, but after Li Keyong gave him a mild rebuke, no longer drank for the rest of his life. Li Keyong favored Li Sizhao for his carefulness and tolerance, and made Li Sizhao a commander of his guard corps, often having Li Sizhao accompany him on campaigns.

== Service under Li Keyong ==
The first campaign in which historical sources described Li Sizhao as himself leading an army was in 897, when Li Keyong's ally Wang Ke the military governor of Huguo Circuit (護國, headquartered in modern Yuncheng, Shanxi) was attacked by his cousin Wang Gong the military governor of Baoyi Circuit (保義, headquartered in modern Sanmenxia, Henan), who was allied with Li Keyong's archenemy Zhu Quanzhong the military governor of Xuanwu Circuit (宣武, headquartered in modern Kaifeng, Henan). Both Li Keyong and Zhu sent forces in support of their respective allies, with Li Keyong's army commanded by Li Sizhao. The Xuanwu generals Zhang Cunjing (張存敬) and Yang Shihou were initially able to defeat Wang Ke and put Huguo's capital Hezhong Municipality (河中) under siege, but Li Sizhao was able to then defeat the Baoyi forces at Yishi (猗氏) and then at Zhangdian (張店, both in modern Yuncheng) and lift the siege on Hezhong.

In 898, when Wang Ke was set to marry a daughter of Li Keyong's and went from Hezhong to Hedong's capital Taiyuan Municipality to do so, Li Keyong sent Li Sizhao to defend Huguo in Wang Ke's absence.

Later in 898, when Li Keyong sent Li Sizhao and Zhou Dewei to try to recover three prefectures east of the Taihang Mountains that he had previously lost to Zhu (Xing (邢州, in modern Xingtai, Hebei), Ci (磁州, in modern Handan, Hebei), and Ming (洺州, also in modern Handan)). However, they were defeated by Zhu's general Ge Congzhou, who subsequently cut off their escape path back into the Taihang. It was due to the effort of Li Keyong's adoptive son Li Siyuan in fighting through Ge's blockade that the Hedong army was able to escape. Yet later in the year, Wang Gong made another attack on Huguo, but when Li Sizhao went to Wang Ke's aid, Li Sizhao was able to repel Wang Gong.

Around the new year 899, Li Keyong's subordinate Li Hanzhi the prefect of Ze Prefecture (澤州, in modern Jincheng, Shanxi) seized Lu Prefecture (潞州, in modern Changzhi, Shanxi), then turned against Li Keyong and submitted to Zhu. Li Keyong ordered Li Sizhao to attack Li Hanzhi, and Li Sizhao was able to immediately capture Ze and take Li Hanzhi's family members captive, sending them to Taiyuan. However, Li Keyong subsequently diverted Li Sizhao to try to aid Luo Shaowei the military governor of Weibo Circuit (魏博, headquartered in modern Handan), who was then under attack from Liu Rengong the military governor of Lulong Circuit (盧龍, headquartered in modern Beijing). However, as Liu was subsequently repelled by the Xuanwu generals Ge Congzhou and He Delun (賀德倫) (as Luo also requested aid from Zhu) before Li Sizhao could arrive in Weibo territory, Luo again cut off relations with Hedong, and Li Sizhao withdrew.

In Li Sizhao's absence, Li Keyong sent Li Junqing (李君慶) to attack Li Hanzhi at Lu Prefecture, but Li Junqing was defeated by the Xuanwu generals Zhang Cunjing and Ding Hui. Li Keyong executed Li Junqing and again commissioned Li Sizhao to attack Li Hanzhi. Li Sizhao first recaptured Ze (which Ding had captured) and then put Lu under siege. With Ge having been recalled by Zhu by that point, He Delun abandoned Lu, allowing Li Sizhao to recapture it for Li Keyong. Li Keyong commissioned Meng Qian (孟遷) as the acting military governor of Zhaoyi Circuit (昭義, headquartered at Lu Prefecture).

In late 899, Zhu sent Ge to launch a punitive campaign against Liu, putting Liu's son Liu Shouwen under siege at Cang Prefecture (滄州, in modern Cangzhou, Hebei). In spring 900, Li Keyong sent Li Sizhao to attack Xing and Ming Prefectures to try to relieve the pressure on the Lius. Subsequently, though, Zhu recalled Ge, as Wang Rong the military governor of Chengde Circuit (成德, headquartered in modern Shijiazhuang, Hebei) mediated the dispute, and Ge's army was also itself stalled by rainstorms. By that point, Li Sizhao had captured Ming Prefecture. Zhu sent Ge against Li Sizhao, and subsequently arrived himself with reinforcements. Li Sizhao withdrew but suffered substantial losses.

In fall 900, Zhu himself launched a major attack on Chengde and Yiwu Circuit (義武, headquartered in modern Baoding, Hebei), whose military governor Wang Gao was an ally of Li Keyong's. He first forced Wang Rong to submit, and then attacked Wang Gao. When Zhu defeated Wang Gao's uncle Wang Chuzhi, Wang Gao abandoned Yiwu and fled to Hedong. The Yiwu soldiers subsequently supported Wang Chuzhi to take over the circuit and sue for peace with Xuanwu by submitting to Zhu. During Zhu's campaign, Li Keyong tried to relieve the pressure on Yiwu by sending Li Sizhao to attack Zhu's Heyang Circuit (河陽, headquartered in modern Jiaozuo, Henan). Li Sizhao quickly captured Heyang's Huai Prefecture (懷州, in modern Jiaozuo, Henan) and then put Heyang Circuit's capital Heyang under siege. However, he was subsequently repelled by the Xuanwu officer Yan Bao (閻寶) and forced to withdraw.

In spring 901, Li Sizhao recaptured Ze, which had again fallen to Xuanwu forces. However, in a subsequent major attack by Xuanwu forces, commanded by Shi Shucong (氏叔琮), against Hedong, the Xuanwu forces advanced all the way to Taiyuan and put it under siege. The city almost fell, and it was said that it was due to nightly counterattacks by Li Sizhao and Li Siyuan that the siege was unsuccessful. With Xuanwu forces bogged down by rain and running out of food supplies, Zhu recalled Shi. Further, Zhaoyi Circuit was, for the time being, lost to Zhu, as Meng surrendered to Xuanwu forces during the campaign. Zhu commissioned Ding as Zhaoyi's military governor. Later in the year, Li Keyong did send Li Sizhao and Zhou to capture Xi (隰州) and Ci (慈州, both in modern Linfen, Shanxi, not the same prefecture as the one east of the Taihang Mountains) Prefectures, which had become under Zhu's control when Zhu conquered Huguo earlier in 901.

Later in 901, the powerful eunuchs at the Tang imperial court at Chang'an, believing that then-reigning Emperor Zhaozong of Tang and the chancellor Cui Yin were able to slaughter them, forcibly seized Emperor Zhaozong and took him to Fengxiang Circuit (鳳翔, headquartered in modern Baoji, Shaanxi), then reigned by the eunuchs' ally Li Maozhen. Cui, who was allied with Zhu, summoned Zhu to attack Fengxiang. Li Maozhen wrote Li Keyong to request aid. Li Keyong sent Li Sizhao to attack Jin Prefecture (晉州, in modern Linfen), and Li Sizhao defeated Xuanwu forces at Jin Prefecture. Subsequent battles in spring 902 in which Li Sizhao and Zhou engaged Shi and Zhu's nephew Zhu Youning (朱友寧), however, could not produce conclusive Hedong victories, and Shi was eventually able to defeat Li Sizhao and Zhou at Pu County (蒲縣, in modern Linfen). They tried to withdraw, but the Xuanwu forces chased them. In the subsequent engagement, Li Keyong's son Li Tingluan (李廷鸞) was captured by Xuanwu forces, who then again advanced to Taiyuan and put it under siege. The situation became so dire that Li Keyong, under the advice of his adoptive son Li Cunxin, considered abandoning Taiyuan and fleeing to the north; only at the urging of his wife Lady Liu, as well as Li Sizhao, Li Siyuan, and Zhou, did Li Keyong resolve to defend the city. Li Sizhao and Li Siyuan again led nightly counterattacks against the sieging Xuanwu forces, and eventually, the Xuanwu forces withdrew. Even though Hedong forces were in fact then able to further recapture Ci, Xi, and Fen (汾州, in modern Linfen), it was said that Li Keyong did not dare to again engage Zhu for several years. (Li Maozhen was subsequently forced to sue for peace by surrendering the emperor to Zhu.)

In 903, Li Keyong's officer Wang Jinghui (王敬暉) the prefect of Yun Prefecture (雲州, in modern Datong, Shanxi) rebelled against Li Keyong and submitted to Liu Rengong. Li Keyong sent Li Sizhao and an adoptive son, Li Cunshen, to attack Wang. Liu Rengong sent an army to aid Wang, forcing Li Sizhao and Li Cunshen to hold off on their attack and allowing Wang to take his army and flee to Liu. Even though Li Sizhao and Li Cunshen subsequently defeated another officer who rebelled against Li Keyong, Qibi Rang (契苾讓), who then committed suicide, and retake Zhenwu (振武, in modern Hohhot, Inner Mongolia), which Qibi had seized, Li Keyong was still angry at them for allowing Wang to escape. He caned them and, for the time being, stripped them of their offices.

In 906, Luo Shaowei, who distrusted the Weibo headquarters guards corps – as they had a history of assassinating or rebelling against past military governors – slaughtered the headquarters guards with support from Zhu. The other troops were outraged by this slaughter, and the officer Shi Renyu (史仁遇) rebelled and occupied Gaotang (高唐, in modern Liaocheng, Shandong), seeking aid from Li Keyong and Liu Shouwen. He was soon under attack by Xuanwu forces. Li Keyong sent Li Sizhao to attack Xing Prefecture to try to relieve the pressure on Shi, but Li Sizhao was unable to capture Xing, defended by Niu Cunjie (牛存節), and was forced to withdraw. Xuanwu forces was then able to capture Gaotang and slaughter Shi and the population of Gaotang.

Later in 906, Zhu advanced north and again put Liu Shouwen under siege at Cang Prefecture. Liu Rengong sought aid from Li Keyong to try to save Liu Shouwen. Under Li Keyong's demand, Liu Rengong sent troops to join Hedong forces under Li Sizhao and Zhou in attacking Lu Prefecture, to try to recapture Zhaoyi Circuit. When the joint Hedong/Lulong forces reached Lu Prefecture, Ding, who had been mourning Emperor Zhaozong (whom Zhu had assassinated in 905 and replaced with his son Emperor Ai), surrendered Lu to them. Li Keyong made Li Sizhao the acting military governor of Zhaoyi. However, a subsequent attack by Hedong forces on Ze Prefecture was unable to capture it, and therefore only Lu Prefecture was in Hedong hands by that point.

In 907, Zhu forced Emperor Ai to yield the throne to him, ending Tang and starting a new Later Liang with him as its Emperor Taizu. Li Keyong, along with Li Maozhen (whose territory became Qi), Yang Wo the military governor of Huainan Circuit (淮南, headquartered in modern Yangzhou, Jiangsu) (whose territory became Wu), and Wang Jian the military governor of Xichuan Circuit (西川, headquartered in modern Chengdu, Sichuan) (whose territory became Former Shu), refused to recognize the Later Liang emperor, and thereafter was effectively the ruler of his own state of Jin (as he had been previously created the Prince of Jin by Emperor Zhaozong). Shortly thereafter, the Later Liang emperor sent the general Kang Huaizhen (康懷貞) to put Lu Prefecture under siege. After a conventional siege failed to capture the city after half a month, Kang built a centipede-like encampment around the city to try to starve it while also using it defensively against any Hedong relief troops. Li Keyong subsequently sent Zhou to command a relief army to try to lift the siege, but while both Li Sizhao and Zhou were able to disrupt the siege operations, Kang's encampment held, and Zhou was unable to lift the siege. By spring 908, with Li Keyong having fallen gravely ill, Zhou withdrew to Luanliu (亂柳, in modern Changzhi). Li Keyong entrusted his oldest biological son, Li Cunxu, whom he designated as his heir, to his brother Li Kening, the eunuch monitor of the army Zhang Chengye, the officers Li Cunzhang and Wu Gong (吳珙), and the secretary Lu Zhi (盧質). Before dying, he stated to Li Cunxu:

Sizhao is stuck in a precarious city, and he is in all kinds of danger. I regret not being able to see him again. After you bury me, you and Dewei need to immediately, with all your strength, try to save him.

Li Keyong, knowing that there was a rivalry between Li Sizhao and Zhou, also told Li Cunxu:

Jintong is both faithful and filially pious, and I love him deeply. But the siege against him cannot be lifted. Is it that Dewei cannot forget their old grudges? Tell Dewei this for me: if the siege on Lu cannot be lifted, I would not be able to close my eyes even in death.

Li Keyong then died, and Li Cunxu succeeded him as the Prince of Jin.

== Service under Li Cunxu ==
It was said that, because of the siege, Lu Prefecture was in a precarious position, with its supplies nearly exhausted. During the siege, on an occasion when Li Sizhao held a feast on the city walls for his officers, a stray arrow hit Li Sizhao's foot, but Li Sizhao, without expressing any commotions, quietly removed the arrow, such that no one realized that he was injured. Several times, Later Liang's Emperor Taizu, who had himself joined the siege, sent messengers with his edicts to try to persuade Li Sizhao to surrender; each time, Li Sizhao executed the messenger and burned Emperor Taizu's edict. Eventually, Emperor Taizu, believing that Lu Prefecture would fall anyway soon without aid (as Zhou Dewei had by that point withdrawn back to Taiyuan, to pay tribute to the new prince), left the siege, and further had his general Liu Zhijun return to the Qi front, where Liu had been stationed.

Li Cunxu himself had, immediately after becoming prince, had to deal with a conspiracy by Li Kening and an adoptive son of Li Keyong's, Li Cunhao (李存顥), to overthrow him, but after executing Li Kening and Li Cunhao, he prepared for a campaign to save Li Sizhao. He put Ding Hui in nominal command of the operation, while he himself, Zhou, and Li Siyuan led the main attacks against the Later Liang centipede encampment. They attacked it under the cover of fog, and the Later Liang forces collapsed and fled. When Zhou subsequently arrived at the city walls and announced that the siege had been lifted, Li Sizhao initially did not believe him, but when Li Cunxu subsequently arrived, wearing white armor (thus signifying that Li Keyong had died), Li Sizhao realized what had occurred and fell into deep mourning before opening the gates to let Li Cunxu enter. (Before the battle, Li Cunxu had told Zhou what Li Keyong had said before his death, and Zhou, in response, fought particularly fiercely during the battle. After the battle, he relayed what occurred to Li Sizhao, and the two reformed a friendship.) In the aftermaths of the siege, it was said that Lu had lost over half of its population due to cold and hunger, and the economy had collapsed. Li Sizhao, in response, encouraged farming and caring for silkworms, and lessened the tax burden on the people. It was said that within several years, Lu was back to prosperity.

In fall 908, Li Sizhao and Zhou attacked Later Liang's Jin Prefecture and put it under siege. Later Liang's Emperor Taizu personally went to aid Jin Prefecture, and when Li Sizhao and Zhou heard that the Later Liang emperor would be soon arriving, they withdrew.

In 914, after Li Cunxu had conquered the territory (then known as Yan) of Liu Rengong's son and successor Liu Shouguang, he advanced south to attack Xing Prefecture. Li Sizhao took his army and joined Li Cunxu in the attack. However, when Yang Shihou arrived to aid the Later Liang garrison of Xing, the Jin army withdrew.

In 916, while Li Cunxu was in a standoff with the Later Liang general Liu Xun at Wei Prefecture (魏州, Weibo's capital, which had by that point fallen to Jin), the Later Liang general Wang Tan (王檀) launched a surprise attack on Taiyuan, which was caught without preparation and nearly fell, escaping that fate only due to the effort of the retired officer An Jinquan (安金全), who commanded a group of retired officers' family members in defending the city. When Li Sizhao heard that Taiyuan was under attack, he immediately sent his officer Shi Junli (石君立) with a detachment of cavalry soldiers to head for Taiyuan to aid in its defense. Shi arrived within a day and announced that Li Sizhao's main army was on its way, and then conducted raids on the Later Liang army with An. The next day, Wang withdrew, allowing Taiyuan to remain uncaptured.

In 918, Li Sizhao accompanied Li Cunxu during a major battle at Huliu Slope (胡柳陂, in modern Heze, Shandong), in which Jin forces were initially crushed by Later Liang forces (with Zhou killed in the battle), but subsequently, under advocacy by Li Sizhao, Li Jianji (李建及), and Yan Bao (who had surrendered to Jin by that point), he counterattacked, with Li Sizhao and Li JIanji leading the charge, crushing Later Liang forces, allowing the battle to be an overall draw in which both armies lost two thirds of their soldiers. In the aftermaths, Li Cunxu initially sent Li Sizhao to Lulong (where Zhou had been serving as military governor) to oversee it, before later taking the military governorship of Lulong himself and having the eunuch Li Shaohong overseeing the Lulong headquarters.

In 920, Later Liang forces under Liu Xun attacked Zhu Youqian the military governor of Huguo, a Later Liang general who had recently submitted to Jin. Li Cunxu sent Li Sizhao, Li Cunshen, Li Jianji, and Li Cunxian (李存賢) to aid Zhu Youqian. Jin forces defeated Liu's army, causing him to withdraw with substantial losses.

In 921, Wang Rong, who had by that point become independent of Later Liang as the Prince of Zhao and was allied with Li Cunxu, was assassinated by his adoptive son Wang Deming, who then took over his domain and changed his name back to the birth name of Zhang Wenli. Li Cunxu, wanting to avenge Wang Rong, launched a campaign against Zhang. Zhang sought aid from the Khitan's Emperor Taizu (Yelü Abaoji), who quickly advanced into Jin's Lulong Circuit. Li Cunxu himself headed north to engage the Khitan emperor, but his army, terrified at the Khitan cavalry strength, had low morale, and Li Cunxu considered, pursuant to some officers' request, lifting the siege on Zhao's capital Zhen Prefecture (鎮州) and withdrawing. Li Sizhao pointed out that doing so would merely cause the army to collapse. Li Cunxu therefore resolved to engage the Khitan army head-on, and defeated the Khitan army in a battle in which Li Sizhao led successful Jin cavalry maneuvers to save Li Cunxu when Li Cunxu was, at one point, surrounded by Khitan's Xi soldiers.

Meanwhile, Li Cunxu had put Yan Bao in command of the siege of Zhen Prefecture, but after Yan suffered a defeat by Zhang Wenli's son and successor Zhang Chujin (Zhang Wenli's having died at the start of the siege), Li Cunxu sent Li Sizhao to replace Yan. Li Sizhao initially had success against raids by Zhang Chujin's soldiers, but during one encounter, a Zhao soldier fired an arrow and hit Li Sizhao in his head. Li Sizhao, who was out of arrows at that point, pulled the arrow off his own head and fired it at the soldier, killing the soldier. However, that night, he died from the wound. Under his final order, the Zhaoyi soldiers at the siege remained under the command of his secretary Ren Huan, and the Zhao army did not find out about Li Sizhao's death.

Meanwhile, Li Cunxu, who was mourning Li Sizhao's death, ordered that Li Sizhao's sons escort Li Sizhao's escort back to Taiyuan for burial. Li Sizhao's son Li Jineng (李繼能), however, disobeyed the order, took several thousand Zhaoyi soldiers, and headed back to Lu Prefecture with Li Sizhao's casket. When Li Cunxu sent his brother Li Cunwo (李存渥) after Li Jineng to get him to change his mind, Li Jineng and his brothers not only refused but threatened to kill Li Cunwo, causing Li Cunwo to flee. Subsequently, Li Sizhao's son Li Jitao took control of Zhaoyi Circuit. After Li Cunxu later declared himself emperor of a new Later Tang (as Emperor Zhuangzong), he posthumously created Li Sizhao the Prince of Longxi. Yet later, after Li Siyuan succeeded Li Cunxu (as Emperor Mingzong), he ordered that Li Sizhao be worshipped at the temple for Emperor Zhuangzong.

== Notes and references ==
- History of the Five Dynasties, vol. 52.
- New History of the Five Dynasties, vol. 36.
- Zizhi Tongjian, vols. 261, 262, 263, 264, 265, 266, 267, 268, 269, 270, 271.
