= Luo Shaowei =

Chinese warlord

Luo Shaowei (Chinese: 羅紹威; 877 – July 4, 910), courtesy name Duanji (端己), formally Prince Zhenzhuang of Ye (鄴貞莊王), was a warlord who ruled Weibo Circuit (魏博, headquartered in modern Handan, Hebei), also known as Tianxiong Circuit (天雄), as its military governor (Jiedushi), late in the Chinese Tang dynasty and early in Tang's successor state Later Liang. His rule over Weibo was originally largely independent, but toward the end of his life increasingly integrated with the Later Liang state, in large part due to his massacre of his unruly headquarters guard corps, which lessened the danger of an overthrow but also decreased the strength of the Weibo army and forced its reliance on the Later Liang state.

== Background ==
Luo Shaowei was born in 877, during the reign of Emperor Xizong. His family was from Guixiang (貴鄉), one of the two counties making up Weibo's capital Wei Prefecture (魏州). At the time of his birth, his father Luo Hongxin was not yet the military governor of Weibo, but was likely an officer in the Weibo army. In 888, the Weibo soldiers mutinied against the military governor Le Yanzhen, due to their anger at the mistreatment by Le's son Le Congxun (樂從訓), forced Le Yanzhen into retirement as a Buddhist monk, and initially supported the officer Zhao Wenbian (趙文㺹) to succeed Le Yanzhen. When Le Congxun, who was then at Xiang Prefecture (相州, in modern Handan), attacked with his own army, Zhao refused to engage Le Congxun, so the soldiers killed him and supported Luo Hongxin instead. Luo Hongxin subsequently defeated and killed Le Congxun, and then killed Le Yanzhen as well. He took over as military governor.

At some port during Luo Hongxin's rule, Luo Shaowei became the deputy military governor. When Luo Hongxin died in 898, the soldiers supported him to succeed Luo Hongxin. He initially took the title of acting military governor, which then-ruling Emperor Zhaozong (Emperor Xizong's brother and successor) confirmed. Later in the year, Emperor Zhaozong commissioned him full military governor, and created him the Prince of Changsha.

== As military governor ==
=== During Tang ===
Luo Shaowei was said to be decisive and intelligent in his youth, and capable of administration. At some point, Emperor Zhaozong gave him the honorary title of acting Taiwei (太尉, one of the Three Excellencies).

In 899, Liu Rengong the military governor of Lulong Circuit (盧龍, headquartered in modern Beijing), who had ambitions of taking over the entire region north of the Yellow River, attacked Weibo with his son Liu Shouwen the military governor of Yichang Circuit (義昌, headquartered in modern Cangzhou, Hebei). Liu Rengong first captured Weibo's Bei Prefecture (貝州, in modern Xingtai, Hebei) and slaughtered its population, and then headed for Wei Prefecture. Luo sought aid from his long-time ally Zhu Quanzhong the military governor of Xuanwu Circuit (宣武, headquartered in modern Kaifeng, Henan), who sent his generals Li Si'an (李思安) and Zhang Cunjing (張存敬) to aid Luo. Li subsequently defeated Liu Rengong and forced him to withdraw. (During Liu's attack, Luo also sought aid from Zhu's archenemy Li Keyong the military governor of Hedong Circuit (河東, headquartered in modern Taiyuan, Shanxi), notwithstanding his father's previous enmity with Li Keyong; Li Keyong sent his nephew Li Sizhao to aid Weibo, but before Li Sizhao actually arrived, Lulong forces had already been repelled by Xuanwu forces, so Luo cut off relations with Hedong again.) Late in the year, Emperor Zhaozong gave Luo the honorary chancellor designation of Tong Zhongshu Menxia Pingzhangshi (同中書門下平章事).

In 901, Emperor Zhaozong gave Luo the greater honorary chancellor title of Shizhong (侍中).

In 904, Zhu, who had Emperor Zhaozong under his physical control, forced Emperor Zhaozong to vacate the imperial capital Chang'an and move the capital to Luoyang. Zhu ordered his allied circuits to contribute in constructing palaces and various imperial restitutions in Luoyang, and Luo sent his army to build the imperial ancestral temples at Luoyang. In response to this, later in the year, Weibo Circuit was renamed Tianxiong Circuit. Also that year, Luo's noble title was upgraded from Prince of Changsha to Prince of Ye.

In 905, Li Gongquan (李公佺), an officer of the Tianxiong headquarters guard corps (牙軍, Ya Jun), was plotting a mutiny. When Luo discovered this, Li Gongquan burned some of the headquarters buildings and pillaged the city, and then fled to Yichang Circuit.

Li Gongquan's mutiny caused Luo to become increasingly apprehensive of the headquarters guard corps, which had a 200-year history and had long been key players in the overthrows of past military governors. He thus secretly informed the situation to Zhu and requested Zhu's aid in destroying the headquarters guard corps. In 906, Zhu sent a 70,000-men army commanded by Li Si'an, claiming to be ready to attack Yichang in conjunction with troops from Weibo and Chengde (成德, headquartered in modern Shijiazhuang, Hebei) Circuits to punish it for accepting Li Gongquan. At that time, it happened that Zhu's daughter, who had married Luo's son Luo Tinggui (羅廷規), had died. Zhu sent his officer Ma Sixun (馬嗣勳) into the city with an apparently small contingent, claiming to be preparing for Zhu's daughter's funeral — but was in fact a much larger contingent, with soldiers hidden in the containers supposedly containing funereal supplies. Luo then secretly sent soldiers to damage the headquarters guard corps' bows and armors. That night, Luo and Ma jointly attacked the headquarters guard corps. When the headquarters guards tried to fight back, their bows and their armors had been damaged, and therefore they could not fight back and were slaughtered, along with their families, some 8,000 households.

The slaughter of the headquarters guard corps shocked and angered the other Tianxiong troops, despite Luo's attempt to explain to them the reasons. A group of soldiers supported the officer Shi Renyu (史仁遇), who took over Gaotang (高唐, in modern Liaocheng, Shandong) and claimed the title of acting military governor. He sought aid from Hedong and Yichang. However, he was quickly defeated and killed by Zhu's officers Li Zhouyi (李周彝) and Fu Daozhao (符道昭), before those circuits could aid him. Still, even with Zhu's aid, it took Luo half a year to quell all of the mutinies. During that period, with the Xuanwu army present and Luo forced to supply it well, the Tianxiong supplies were exhausted. It was aid that the destruction of the headquarters guard corps ended much of the threat against Luo's rule, but the fighting abilities of the Tianxiong army was thereafter permanently damaged. Luo, in regret, stated, "Even with all the iron from the six prefectures and 43 counties of this circuit, I could not have forged a greater error."

Later that year, when Zhu launched a punitive campaign against Yichang, Luo became the main supplier for his army. He also built a mansion for Zhu at Wei Prefecture, supplying luxurious items for Zhu. After Zhu was forced to abandon the campaign due to a rebellion by Ding Hui the military governor of Zhaoyi Circuit (昭義, headquartered in modern Changzhi, Shanxi), he returned to Wei Prefecture in spring 907 and stayed there for some time to recover from an illness. Luo, fearing that Zhu was contemplating seizing Tianxiong, met Zhu and suggested to Zhu that he should seize the Tang throne. Zhu declined at that time, but was secretly thankful to Luo. Later in the year, he forced Emperor Zhaozong's son and successor Emperor Ai to yield the throne to him, ending Tang and starting a new Later Liang as its Emperor Taizu.

=== During Later Liang ===
The new Later Liang emperor bestowed the title of acting Taifu (太傅, "the emperor's teacher") on Luo Shaowei. Meanwhile, the Later Liang regime, while recognized by most regional governors, was unrecognized by several key warlords — Li Keyong, Li Maozhen the military governor of Fengxiang Circuit (鳳翔, headquartered in modern Baoji, Shaanxi), Yang Wo the military governor of Huainan Circuit (淮南, headquartered in modern Yangzhou, Jiangsu), and Wang Jian the military governor of Xichuan Circuit (西川, headquartered in modern Chengdu, Sichuan). Liu Rengong and Liu Shouwen did not take clear actions to recognize or not to recognize the new regime. Later in the year, though, after Liu Rengong was overthrown and put under house arrest by another son, Liu Shouguang, Liu Shouguang submitted to the Later Liang emperor. Liu Shouwen thereafter attacked Liu Shouguang, trying to free their father, but his campaign stalemated. Luo, believing that this would be an opportune time to persuade Liu Shouwen to submit to Later Liang, wrote him to persuade him to do so. Liu Shouwen agreed, and thereafter submitted to Emperor Taizu as a subject.

In 909, Luo suffered a paralysis in his limb(s), and wrote to Emperor Taizong, in an explicit offer to surrender physical control of the circuit:

Wei Prefecture is an important post, surrounded by enemies. Your Imperial Majesty should send an official with accomplishments here to defend it. I, your subject, seek to retire to my mansion.

Emperor Taizu was touched, and, while appreciative of Luo's offer, commissioned his second son Luo Zhouhan (Luo Tinggui having died earlier) as the deputy military governor and put Luo Zhouhan in temporary command, stating to Luo Shaowei's messenger:

Return with these words to your lord: Try to eat for me. If the unspeakable happens to him, I will return his loyalty by letting his descendants be honored for generations. I am putting Zhouhan in charge of the headquarters and hoping that he will recover soon.

Luo Shaowei did not recover, however, and died in 910. Emperor Taizu made Luo Zhouhan acting military governor, and later full military governor.

Luo Shaowei was said to be capable in writing. He had a large book collection, and he established schools at the circuit. Whenever he held feasts for his staff, he would write poems. As he admired the poetry of Luo Yin, a staff member of a fellow Later Liang vassal, Qian Liu the Prince of Wuyue, he sent Luo Yin gifts and referred to Luo Yin as a kinsman (as they were both surnamed Luo). Luo Yin returned the favor by sending his poems to Luo Shaowei. Therefore, when Luo Shaowei collected his own poems into a collection, he entitled the collection, The Collection of My Thefts from Jiangdong (偷江東集). (Jiangdong refers to the region south of the Yangtze River, where Wuyue was.)

== Notes and references ==
- New Book of Tang, vol. 210.
- History of the Five Dynasties, vol. 14.
- New History of the Five Dynasties, vol. 39.
- Zizhi Tongjian, 261, 262, 264, 265, 266, 267.
