= Li Hanzhi =

Chinese Buddhist monk, military general, politician and warlord

Li Hanzhi (Chinese: 李罕之; 842 – July 26, 899), formally the Prince of Longxi (隴西王), nickname Li Moyun (李摩雲), was a Chinese Buddhist monk, military general, politician, and warlord of the late medieval Tang dynasty. He was initially a follower of the major agrarian rebel Huang Chao, and later became a Tang general, mostly known for his service under Li Keyong. He was known for ferocity in carrying out raids.

== Background ==
Li Hanzhi was born in 842, during the reign of Emperor Wuzong. He was from Xiangcheng (項城, in modern Zhoukou, Henan). His father Li Wen (李文) was, and his family had been, farmers for generations. It was said that in his youth, Li Hanzhi was strong and dextrous, and he was capable of fighting several people at the same time. He initially studied Confucian doctrines, but could not achieve much in doing so, and thereafter became a Buddhist monk. However, because his behavior was not proper, wherever he went, he found no acceptance; in particular, when he begged for food at Suanzao (酸棗, in modern Xinxiang, Henan), no one would give him any food. In anger, he abandoned his monk clothing and became a bandit in the region. At that time, as Huang Chao had risen in rebellion against then-reigning Emperor Xizong, Li joined Huang and became a key general in Huang's army. In 879, however, when Gao Pian the Tang military governor (Jiedushi) of Huainan Circuit (淮南, headquartered in modern Yangzhou, Jiangsu) sent his officers Zhang Lin (張璘) and Liang Zuan (梁纉) to attack Huang, the Huainan army initially prevailed, and Li surrendered to the Huainan army, along with Qin Yan, Bi Shiduo, and Xu Qing (許勍). (It was after this defeat that Huang took his army south to the Lingnan region.)

== Initial service under Gao Pian and Zhuge Shuang ==
Gao Pian made Li Hanzhi an officer in his army, and later commissioned as the prefect of Guang Prefecture (光州, in modern Xinyang, Henan). At a later point, when Qin Zongquan the military governor of Fengguo Circuit (奉國, headquartered in modern Zhumadian, Henan) rebelled against Tang and seized nearby territory, Li was pressured by the Fengguo army and abandoned Guang Prefecture. He returned home to Xiangcheng and gathered his forces there, and submitted to Zhuge Shuang the military governor of Heyang Circuit (河陽, headquartered in modern Jiaozuo, Henan). Zhuge made him the prefect of Huai Prefecture (懷州, in modern Luoyang, Henan).

In 883, Han Jian the military governor of Weibo Circuit (魏博, headquartered in modern Handan, Hebei), who had captured Heyang at one point but then lost it to Zhuge, attacked Heyang again. Zhuge sent Li to engage Han, and Li defeated Han at Wuzhi (武陟, in modern Jiaozuo, Henan) and repelled his attack. (As a result of the defeat, Han was subsequently overthrown by his officer Le Xingda, and was killed shortly after.) Subsequently, when Emperor Xizong commissioned Zhuge as one of the commanders of the forces against Qin, Zhuge commissioned Li as his deputy, as well as the defender of the Tang eastern capital Luoyang. As Luoyang had been laid waste by the wars by that point, Li made Shengshan Temple (聖善寺) his headquarters. Meanwhile, when Li Keyong, the ethnically Shatuo military governor of Hedong Circuit (河東, headquartered in modern Taiyuan, Shanxi), went through Luoyang on the way back to Hedong after a campaign against Huang, Li welcomed him and formed a friendship with him.

In 885, Qin sent his general Sun Ru to attack Luoyang. Li battled Sun for several months, but eventually ran out of food supplies, so he abandoned Luoyang and set up his headquarters at Mianchi (澠池, in modern Sanmenxia, Henan), allowing Sun to seize Luoyang. However, Sun abandoned Luoyang after a month (after burning the palaces at Luoyang), and Li was able to take his army and return to Luoyang.

In 886, Zhuge died, and initially the officers Liu Jing (劉經) and Zhang Quanyi supported Zhuge's son Zhuge Zhongfang (諸葛仲方) as the acting military governor, but Liu held the actual authorities. He feared that Li would not easily be controllable, so he entered Luoyang himself and attacked Li at Mianchi. Li defeated him and slaughtered most of his army. Li then prepared to give chase across the Yellow River (as Heyang's capital, the city of Heyang, was just north of the Yellow River). Liu sent Zhang to resist Li, but by this point, Zhang was also alienated by Liu's domination of the circuit, and then instead joined Li in attacking Heyang. They were, however, defeated by Liu, and withdrew to Huai Prefecture.

However, Sun soon returned to the region and captured Heyang, forcing Zhuge Zhongfang to flee to Xuanwu Circuit (宣武, headquartered in modern Kaifeng, Henan). Sun himself claimed the title of military governor of Heyang, but Zhang, who was then still at Huai Prefecture, and Li, who by that point was at Ze Prefecture (澤州, in modern Jincheng, Shanxi), held out and refused to submit to Sun. In 887, after Xuanwu's military governor Zhu Quanzhong defeated Qin when Qin attacked him, the generals that Qin sent out to the surrounding territory, including Sun, all abandoned their campaigns. After Sun abandoned Heyang, Li and Zhang entered Heyang, and jointly sought aid from Li Keyong. Li Keyong sent his officer An Jinjun (安金俊) to aid them and commissioned An the prefect of Ze, Li the military governor of Heyang, and Zhang the mayor of Luoyang.

== Loss of Heyang Circuit ==
Li Hanzhi and Zhang Quanyi had a close friendship initially, but the friendship gradually waned over Li's lack of respect for Zhang's campaign to rebuild Luoyang. Further, even though Zhang tried to supply Li's army well, Li often seized Zhang's subordinates and tortured them if they could not satisfy Li's demands. In 888, while Li was preparing a campaign against Wang Chongying the military governor of Huguo Circuit (護國, headquartered in modern Yuncheng, Shanxi), Wang secretly persuaded Zhang to turn against Li. Zhang thus took his forces and attacked Heyang, capturing it and taking Li's family captive. Zhang then claimed the title of military governor of Heyang. Li fled to Ze Prefecture and sought aid from Li Keyong.

Li Keyong sent his officer Kang Junli to assist Li Hanzhi to try to recapture Heyang, with Li Cunxiao, Xue Atan (薛阿檀), Shi Yan (史儼), An Jinjun, and An Xiuxiu (安休休) assisting Kang. Zhang defended against the siege, but soon ran out of food. He thus sought aid from Zhu Quanzhong. Zhu sent Ding Hui, Ge Congzhou, and Niu Cunjie (牛存節) to aid Zhang. They inflicted losses on the Hedong army, causing An Xiuxiu to desert (as he feared punishment for the defeat). When the Xuanwu forces next acted as if they were going to cut off Hedong forces' escape path through the Taihang Mountains, Kang took the Hedong forces and withdrew. Zhu commissioned Ding as the acting military governor of Heyang, while returning Zhang to Luoyang as its mayor. Li Hanzhi, meanwhile, withdrew to Ze Prefecture and continued to claim the title of military governor of Heyang; he also sent his son Li Qi (李頎) to Hedong to serve under Li Keyong. It was said that he spent his days raiding the region as far east as Huai and Meng (孟州, in modern Luoyang) Prefectures and as far west as Jin (晉州, in modern Jincheng) and Jiang (絳州, in modern Yuncheng) Prefectures, such that the region became completely depopulated. In particular, there was a fort built by the people on Mount Moyun (摩雲山, in modern Yuncheng) to defend themselves during the wars. In the past, no army was able to come close to the fort, but Li Hanzhi captured it, earning him the nickname of Li Moyun. When he subsequently tried to again join forces with Hedong troops later that year to recapture Heyang, however, he was repelled by Ding.

== Service under Li Keyong ==
Li Hanzhi thereafter often served under Li Keyong in Li Keyong's campaigns. In 889, for example, Li Keyong sent him and Li Cunxiao to attack Meng Fangli the military governor of Zhaoyi Circuit (昭義, long headquartered in modern Changzhi, Shanxi, although Meng was then having his headquarters at Xing Prefecture (邢州, in modern Xingtai, Hebei)). They defeated Meng's forces, and Meng committed suicide. Meng Fangli's brother Meng Qian tried to hold out against the Hedong forces with aid from Xuanwu, but soon was forced to surrender.

In 890, when Emperor Xizong's brother and successor Emperor Zhaozong, at the instigation of the chancellor Zhang Jun, as well as Zhu Quanzhong, Li Kuangchou the military governor of Lulong Circuit (盧龍, headquartered in modern Beijing), and Helian Duo the military governor of Datong Circuit (大同, headquartered in modern Datong, Shanxi), announced a general campaign against Li Keyong, one of the prongs of the imperial/Xuanwu/Lulong joint attacks at Heyong was aimed at Li Hanzhi at Ze Prefecture, and as part of the announcement, Emperor Zhaozong stripped Li Hanzhi, as well as Li Keyong, of all offices and titles. Li Keyong sent Li Cunxiao to aid Li Hanzhi; Li Cunxiao, after capturing Zhang Jun's deputy Sun Kui (孫揆) in a surprise attack, defeated the Xuanwu forces sieging Ze Prefecture, forcing them to withdraw. After Li Keyong subsequently defeated Zhang's main forces, Emperor Zhaozong was forced to exile Zhang and fellow chancellor Kong Wei in 891 and restore Li Keyong's and Li Hanzhi's offices.

In 895, when Li Maozhen the military governor of Fengxiang Circuit (鳳翔, headquartered in modern Baoji, Shaanxi), Wang Xingyu the military governor of Jingnan Circuit (靜難, headquartered in modern Xianyang, Shaanxi), and Han Jian (not the same Han Jian who had been the military governor of Weibo) the military governor of Zhenguo Circuit (鎮國, headquartered in modern Weinan, Shaanxi) attacked the imperial capital Chang'an and executed two former chancellors whom they had perceived to be against them (Wei Zhaodu and Li Xi) against Emperor Zhaozong's orders, Li Keyong, assisted by Li Hanzhi, went to the Chang'an region to aid the emperor. They subsequently attacked Jingnan, and Li Hanzhi defeated the forces Li Maozhen sent to aid Wang, causing Wang to flee and be killed by his subordinates in flight, allowing the imperial government to temporary resume control of Jingnan Circuit. For his accomplishments, Li Hanzhi was given the honorary chancellor title of Shizhong (侍中). Emperor Zhaozong also created him the Prince of Longxi.

== Submission to Zhu Quanzhong ==
However, the Jingnan campaign also sowed the seed of Li Hanzhi's dissatisfaction toward Li Keyong. After Jingnan fell to Li Keyong, Li Hanzhi requested that he be given the circuit, which Li Keyong refused — citing the fact that he had promised to turn the circuit to the imperial government and had already recommended the imperial general Su Wenjian (蘇文建) as the new military governor. Li Hanzhi complained bitterly to Li Keyong's strategist Gai Yu, claiming that all he wanted was a small circuit at which he and his army could rest. Gai tried to speak on his behalf, to no avail — and, over the next few years, whenever Li Keyong conquered a circuit or one of the circuits under his control needed a military governor, Li Keyong would refuse to consider Li Hanzhi. Gai feared that Li Hanzhi would be resentful, but when he spoke with Li Keyong, Li Keyong stated that the reason why he did not want to give a circuit to Li Hanzhi was that he feared that if Li Hanzhi had a circuit, he would no longer follow Li Keyong's orders.

Around the new year 899, one of Li Keyong's subordinates, Xue Zhiqin (薛志勤) the military governor of Zhaoyi, died. A replacement was not quickly announced. Li Hanzhi decided to preempt Li Keyong; he entered Zhaoyi's capital Lu Prefecture (潞州), taking it over, and then submitted a report to Li Keyong asking to be made military governor. Li Keyong, in anger, sent messengers to rebuke him. Li Hanzhi then turned against Li Keyong, arresting the Hedong officers at Lu Prefecture and delivering them, with his son Li Hao (李顥), to Zhu Quanzhong, asking for aid. Li Keyong launched an attack on Li Hanzhi, with his nephew Li Sizhao quickly capturing Ze Prefecture and taking Li Hanzhi's family members prisoner. (Li Keyong also wanted to put Li Qi to death, but Li Keyong's son Li Cunxu, who was friendly with Li Qi, gave Li Qi a horse to escape on.) Zhu thereafter commissioned Li Hanzhi as the military governor of Zhaoyi.

Li Keyong then sent Li Junqing (李君慶) to siege Lu Prefecture. Zhu himself headed to Heyang to prepare further operations, but sent Zhang Cunjing (張存敬) to give immediate aid to Li Hanzhi. Zhang defeated Li Junqing and forced him to withdraw. Li Keyong put Li Junqing to death, and replaced him with Li Sizhao. At that time, Li Hanzhi fell ill, and Zhu decided to swap his and Ding Hui's circuits, making him the military governor of Heyang and Ding the military governor of Zhaoyi. Li Hanzhi thus headed south to Heyang Circuit, and he died after reaching Huai Prefecture.

== Notes and references ==
- New Book of Tang, vol. 187.
- History of the Five Dynasties, vol. 15.
- New History of the Five Dynasties, vol. 42.
- Zizhi Tongjian, vols. 253, 255, 256, 257, 258, 260, 261.
