= Zhuge Shuang =

Tang Chinese general

Zhuge Shuang (Chinese: 諸葛爽) (d. 886) was a general of the Chinese Tang dynasty, who controlled Heyang Circuit (河陽, headquartered in modern Jiaozuo, Henan) for some time and who vacillated between allegiance to Tang and to the Qi state of the agrarian rebel Huang Chao.

== Background and early career ==
It is not known when Zhuge Shuang was born, but it is known that he was from Bochang (博昌, in modern Binzhou, Shandong). He was a local militia soldier at one point and served at his home county of Bochang, but after he was caned by the county magistrate for reasons lost to history, he deserted and became a beggar. When Pang Xun rebelled and took over Xu Prefecture (徐州, in modern Xuzhou, Jiangsu) in 868, Zhuge joined his army and became a low-level officer. When the imperial troops subsequently attacked Pang and Pang's strength was fading, Zhuge took some 100 soldiers and surrendered to the imperial army, along with fellow officer Yang Qun (陽群). He was eventually made the defender of Ru Prefecture (汝州, in modern Pingdingshan, Henan).

In 880, the Tang imperial government was facing a rebellion led by the Shatuo chieftain Li Guochang and Li Guochang's son Li Keyong, and the Shatuo rebels were threatening Taiyuan Municipality, the capital of the important Hedong Circuit (河東). At that time, Zhuge, who was still serving as the defender of Ru Prefecture, was ordered to take the troops defending the eastern capital Luoyang north to help relieve Taiyuan. He was also made the deputy to the overall commander of the operations, Li Zhuo (李涿). He was also subsequently made the military governor (jiedushi) of Zhenwu Circuit (振武, headquartered in modern Hohhot, Inner Mongolia), replacing Wu Shitai (吳師泰), who was summoned back to the capital Chang'an to serve as an imperial guard general, but Wu resisted the order. Then-reigning Emperor Xizong could not force Wu to accept the order, and thereafter allowed Wu to remain at Zhenwu while making Zhuge the military governor of Xiasui Circuit (夏綏, in modern Yulin, Shaanxi).

In late 880, with the major agrarian rebel Huang Chao approaching Chang'an, Emperor Xizong ordered the military governor of Hedong, Zheng Congdang, to give his troops to Zhuge and Zhu Mei, to have them take them to Chang'an to help stop the Huang attack, but it did not appear that Zhuge and Zhu had the opportunity to do so before Chang'an fell to Huang, forcing Emperor Xizong to flee to Chengdu. Huang declared himself the emperor of a new state of Qi. Zhuge subsequently camped his troops at the site of modern Xi'an, near Chang'an, opposing those of Huang's general Zhu Wen. Huang had Zhu Wen send overtures to Zhuge to persuade Zhuge to submit to Qi, and Zhuge subsequently did.

== Takeover of Heyang Circuit ==
After Zhuge Shuang submitted to Qi, Huang Chao commissioned him the military governor of Heyang Circuit (河陽, headquartered in modern Jiaozuo, Henan) and sent him to Heyang to try to take it over. The Tang-commissioned military governor Luo Yuangao (羅元杲) tried to resist him, but Luo's soldiers deserted Luo and surrendered to Zhuge, and Luo was forced to abandon Heyang and flee to Emperor Xizong. Zhuge thus took over Heyang. In spring 881, however, he submitted a petition to Emperor Xizong, offering to resubmit to Tang. Emperor Xizong accepted and commissioned him the military governor of Heyang. Emperor Xizong further bestowed on him the honorary chancellor designation of Tong Zhongshu Menxia Pingzhangshi (同中書門下平章事) in 882.

== Campaign against Han Jian and aftermaths ==
In fall 882, Han Jian the military governor of nearby Weibo Circuit (魏博, headquartered in modern Handan, Hebei), who had ambitions of seizing nearby circuits' territory, attacked Heyang, defeating Zhuge Shuang at Xiuwu (修武, in modern Jiaozuo, Henan), and Zhuge abandoned Heyang and fled. Han subsequently left an army commanded by his officer Zhao Wenbian (趙文弁) at Heyang to defend it, while he himself headed east and attacked Tianping Circuit (天平, headquartered in modern Tai'an, Shandong). In winter 882, however, the people of Heyang sent overtures to Zhuge to ask him back. At that time, Zhuge had gone as far as Jinshang Circuit (金商, headquartered in modern Shangluo, Shaanxi), but upon receiving this news returned to Heyang and entered the capital Meng Prefecture (孟州), surprising the Weibo garrison. He politely parlayed with them, gave them rewards, and sent them away. Meanwhile, Li Hanzhi the prefect of Guang Prefecture (光州, in modern Xinyang, Henan) was attacked by Qin Zongquan, who had submitted to Huang Chao (who had by that point, under Tang pressure, abandoned Chang'an and headed back east), and fled to Zhuge. Zhuge commissioned him as the prefect of Huai Prefecture (懷州, in modern Jiaozuo).

Meanwhile, Han was unable to capture Tianping's capital Yun Prefecture (鄆州), and eventually entered into a peace agreement with Tianping's acting military governor Zhu Xuan in spring 883. He then returned to Heyang and tried to attack it. Zhuge sent Li Hanzhi to defend against the Weibo attack, and Li Hanzhi defeated Han at Wuzhi (武陟, in modern Jiaozuo). (Subsequently, Han was killed by his soldiers in a mutiny led by Le Xingda.)

At this time, Huang was still posing a threat to many Tang circuits south of the Yellow River, and several of those military governors (Zhou Ji the military governor of Zhongwu Circuit (忠武, headquartered in modern Xuchang, Henan), Shi Pu the military governor of Ganhua Circuit (感化, headquartered at Xu Prefecture), and Zhu Wen (who had by this point submitted to Tang and changed his name to Zhu Quanzhong) the military governor of Xuanwu Circuit (宣武, headquartered in modern Kaifeng, Henan)) sought aid from Li Keyong (who had resubmitted to Tang and was instrumental in Tang's recapture of Chang'an). In spring 884, Li Keyong, who was then the military governor of Hedong, sought passage through Zhuge's territory, but Zhuge was apprehensive of Li Keyong's intentions, and therefore refused on the excuse that the Yellow River bridge near Luoyang had not been repaired. He further stationed his troops at Wanshan (萬善, in modern Jiaozuo) to guard against Li Keyong. Li Keyong thus bypassed Heyang and went through Hezhong Circuit (河中, headquartered in modern Yuncheng, Shanxi) instead.

Zhuge died in winter 886. His officers Liu Jing (劉經) and Zhang Quanyi supported his son Zhuge Zhongfang (諸葛仲方) to be the acting military governor. Soon, however, Liu suspected Li Hanzhi's intentions and attacked him. Zhang, however, was also unhappy about Liu's control of Zhuge Zhongfang's administration, and therefore joined forces with Li Hanzhi to battle Liu. Liu initially defeated them, but subsequently, Qin's officer Sun Ru attacked Heyang, and Zhuge Zhongfang abandoned Heyang and fled to Xuanwu, ending the possibility of the Zhuge family's intergenerational hold on Heyang.

It was said that while Zhuge rose from the ranks of rebels, his rulings were logical, and the territory he governed had clear laws that were easy to follow, and therefore the people supported him.

== Notes and references ==
- Old Book of Tang, vol. 182.
- New Book of Tang, vol. 187.
- Zizhi Tongjian, vols. 253, 254, 255, 256.
