= Han Jian (Weibo warlord) =

Han Jian (Chinese: 韓簡) (died 883), formally the Prince of Changli (昌黎王) or Prince of Wei Commandery (魏郡王), was a warlord late in the Chinese Tang dynasty, who controlled Weibo Circuit (魏博, headquartered in modern Handan, Hebei). When imperial authority disintegrated in the aftermaths of the Huang Chao Rebellion, Han tried to conquer several nearby circuits by force, but after his endeavors failed, his subordinates supported his officer Le Xingda to replace him. Han then either died in distress or was killed.

== Background ==
It is not known when Han Jian was born. His father Han Yunzhong (who was then named Han Junxiong) was a long-time officer at Weibo Circuit and seized control of the circuit when the soldiers mutinied in 870 against then-military governor (Jiedushi) He Quanhao and killed He Quanhao because of He Quanhao's harsh discipline. Han Jian became deputy military governor after his father became military governor.

== Initial service as military governor of Weibo ==
After Han Yunzhong died in 874, the Weibo soldiers supported Han Jian to succeed him, and then-ruling Emperor Xizong agreed, making Han Jian acting military governor initially, and then full military governor in 875. He gave Han Jian the 2nd-class de facto chancellor designation of Tong Zhongshu Menxia Pingzhangshi (同中書門下平章事) in 876 and the position of Palace Attendant in 882. He was also either created the Prince of Changli (per the Old Book of Tang) or the Prince of Wei Commandery (per the New Book of Tang).

== Attempts to conquer nearby circuits, failure, and death ==
By that point, however, Tang imperial authority had collapsed in the aftermaths of the major agrarian rebellion led by Huang Chao — who had captured the Tang imperial capital Chang'an and claimed the throne as the emperor of a new state of Qi, forcing Emperor Xizong to flee to Chengdu — and generals were freely attacking each other over territory. In fall 882, Han Jian, wanting to seize nearby Heyang Circuit (河陽, headquartered in modern Jiaozuo, Henan), took 30,000 soldiers and attacked Heyang's military governor Zhuge Shuang at Xiuwu (修武, in modern Jiaozuo). Zhuge abandoned Xiuwu, and Han left forces to defend Xiuwu, before turning north to pillage Xing (邢州, in modern Xingtai, Hebei) and Ming (洺州, in modern Handan) Prefectures (both belonging to Zhaoyi Circuit (昭義, headquartered in modern Changzhi, Shanxi)); he then returned to Weibo.

Later in the year, Han attacked Yun Prefecture (鄆州, in modern Tai'an, Shandong), the capital of Tianping Circuit (天平), and Tianping's military governor Cao Cunshi (曹存實) died in battle. Cao's officer Zhu Xuan took over the Tianping forces and defended Yun against Han's siege, and Han was unable to capture it for some half a year. During his siege of Yun, Zhuge recaptured the Heyang territory that he had previously lost to Han. In early 883, when Zhu sought peace, Han agreed and withdrew from Tianping, in order to attack Zhuge again at Heyang. Zhuge sent his officer Li Hanzhi to intercept Han at Wuzhi (武陟, in modern Jiaozuo), defeating him. After the battle, Han's officer Le Xingda headed directly back to Weibo's capital Wei Prefecture (魏州) and entered it. The soldiers supported Le's takeover. Thereafter, Han either died in anger or was killed by his own officers.
