= Zhu Xuan =

Chinese warlord during the Tang dynasty

Zhu Xuan (朱瑄 or 朱宣) (d. 897) was a warlord late in the Chinese Tang dynasty, who, from 882 to 897, controlled Tianping Circuit (天平, headquartered in modern Tai'an, Shandong) as its military governor (jiedushi). He formed a power bloc with his cousin Zhu Jin, who ruled neighboring Taining Circuit (泰寧, headquartered in modern Jining, Shandong), and subsequently, they, along with their ally Shi Pu the military governor of Ganhua Circuit (感化, headquartered in modern Xuzhou, Jiangsu), engaged in a lengthy war with their former ally Zhu Quanzhong the military governor of Xuanwu Circuit (宣武, headquartered in modern Kaifeng, Henan) that ravaged the countryside. By 897, all three had been defeated, and Zhu Xuan was captured and executed by Zhu Quanzhong.

== Background ==
It is not known when Zhu Xuan was born, but it is known that he was from Xiayi (下邑, in modern Suzhou, Anhui). As of 882, he was serving under Cao Cunshi (曹存實) the military governor of Tianping Circuit, when Cao was killed in battle when Tianping came under attack by Han Jian the military governor of neighboring Weibo Circuit (魏博, headquartered in modern Handan, Hebei). Zhu took over the defense of Tianping's capital Yun Prefecture (鄆州) after Cao's death and was able to prevent it from falling to Han. Then-reigning Emperor Xizong thereafter made Zhu the acting military governor.

== Initial rule of Tianping ==
In 883, Emperor Xizong made Zhu Xuan full military governor of Tianping. Meanwhile, Han Jian continued his siege of Yun Prefecture, but after six months of failing to capture it and Zhu's peace overture to him, abandoned the Yun siege to engage, instead, Zhuge Shuang, whose Heyang Circuit (河陽, headquartered in modern Jiaozuo, Henan) Han had captured previously but who had recaptured Heyang while Han was sieging Yun. Zhuge defeated Han, who was subsequently assassinated by his own soldiers. Le Xingda succeeded Han at Weibo.

In 884, when Zhu Quanzhong the military governor of Xuanwu Circuit was under attack by Qin Zongquan the military governor of Fengguo Circuit (奉國, headquartered in modern Zhumadian, Henan), Zhu Quanzhong sought aid from Zhu Xuan. Zhu Xuan sent his cousin Zhu Jin, who was said to be the most ferocious officer in Zhu Xuan's army, to aid Zhu Quanzhong. After Zhu Jin repelled Qin's attack, Zhu Quanzhong, thanking Zhu Xuan, honored Zhu Xuan as an older brother.

In winter 884, Zhu Xuan made an unsuccessful bid to take over Yicheng Circuit (義成, headquartered in modern Anyang, Henan). At that time, An Shiru (安師儒) the military governor of Yicheng had alienated his soldiers by overly entrusting authorities to his officers Xiahou Yan (夏侯晏) and Du Biao (杜標). In response, the officer Zhang Xiao (張驍) raised a group of 2,000 soldiers, rebelled against An, and attacked Yicheng's capital Hua Prefecture (滑州), forcing An to placate the soldiers by executing Xiahou and Du. Zhu Xuan, wanting to work on seizing Yicheng, sent his cousin Zhu Yu (朱裕) to induce Zhang into a military confrontation and kill him. Meanwhile, however, Zhu Quanzhong preempted Zhu Xuan by sending his officers Zhu Zhen (朱珍) and Li Tangbin (李唐賓) to launch a surprise attack on Yicheng. Zhu Zhen and Li were able to surprise An and capture him. Zhu Quanzhong took over Yicheng and made his officer Hu Zhen (胡真) acting military governor.

In 886, Zhu Jin, under the guise of marrying the daughter of Qi Kerang the military governor of Taining Circuit, ambushed Qi and expelled him, and then took over Taining, allowing Zhu Xuan and Zhu Jin to each control one circuit.

In 887, Qin launched another major attack on Zhu Quanzhong, who again sought aid from Zhu Xuan and Zhu Jin. Both of them personally led troops to aid Zhu Quanzhong. Zhu Quanzhong thus was able to engage Qin with the armies of four circuits (Xuanwu, Yicheng, Tianping, and Taining) and defeat Qin. In gratitude, Zhu Quanzhong again honored Zhu Xuan and also honored Zhu Jin as older brothers.

However, just later that year, the Zhu Xuan/Zhu Jin alliance with Zhu Quanzhong would break up. Zhu Quanzhong had long had designs on capturing both Tianping and Taining, but found no excuse to attack Zhu Xuan and Zhu Jin, given that they had aided him. He thus made up accusations that they had induced Xuanwu soldiers to desert and sent a harshly worded accusation to Zhu Xuan. Zhu Xuan responded with a harsh letter. Zhu Quanzhong used this as an excuse to send Zhu Zhen and Ge Congzhou to attack Tianping's Cao Prefecture (曹州, in modern Heze, Shandong); they captured it and executed Cao's prefect Qiu Hongli (丘弘禮). He then attacked Pu Prefecture (濮州, in modern Heze). Zhu Xuan and Zhu Jin engaged him but were defeated, barely escaping with their lives. This thus started a war that would not end until Zhu Xuan's death. Later that year, when Zhu Xuan sent his brother Zhu Han (朱罕) to try to lift the siege on Pu, Zhu Zhen defeated and killed Zhu Han. Zhu Zhen subsequently captured Pu, forcing Zhu Yu (who was then the prefect of Pu) to flee to Yun Prefecture. Zhu Zhen then attacked Yun. Zhu Xuan had Zhu Yu send a letter to Zhu Zhen, falsely claiming to be ready to surrender Yun to him. When Zhu Zhen sent soldiers to enter the city on Zhu Yu's signal, the Xuanwu soldiers fell into a trap set by Zhu Xuan and were massacred. Having suffered this loss, Zhu Zhen retreated. Zhu Xuan subsequently recaptured Cao as well.

== War with Zhu Quanzhong ==
Meanwhile, Zhu Xuan had also entered into an alliance with Zhu Quanzhong's archrival Li Keyong the military governor of Hedong Circuit (河東, headquartered in modern Taiyuan, Shanxi). In 891, when Li Keyong's subordinate An Zhijian (安知建) began to have secret communications with Zhu Quanzhong, Li Keyong found out and tried to replace him with his adoptive son Li Cunxiao. An, in fear, fled to Pinglu Circuit (平盧, headquartered in modern Weifang, Shandong). Then-reigning Emperor Zhaozong (Emperor Xizong's brother and successor) then gave An a commission as an imperial guard general. When An led his soldiers to try to head to the imperial capital Chang'an, Zhu Xuan, as he was in alliance with Li Keyong, ambushed him and killed him, delivering his head to Li Keyong.

In 892, Zhu Quanzhong launched another attack on Zhu Xuan, with Zhu Quanzhong's son Zhu Youyu (朱友裕) serving as the forward commander. Zhu Xuan engaged Zhu Youyu and defeated him, forcing him to flee. Zhu Xuan then took over the camp that Zhu Youyu abandoned. When Zhu Quanzhong arrived, he did not realize that Zhu Youyu had fled, and he sent soldiers into the camp with no precautions. Zhu Xuan then attacked, killing a large number of surprised Xuanwu soldiers. Zhu Quanzhong barely escaped with his life, while his deputy military governor Li Fan (李璠) was killed. However, despite this major defeat, Zhu Quanzhong was still subsequently able to defeat Zhu Xuan's and Zhu Jin's ally Shi Pu the military governor of Ganhua Circuit (despite Zhu Xuan's, Zhu Jin's, and Li Keyong's attempts to save Shi), forcing Shi to commit suicide and allowing Zhu Quanzhong to take over Ganhua.

Late in 893, Ge Congzhou attacked Qi Prefecture (齊州, in modern Jinan, Shandong). Zhu Xuan and Zhu Jin came to the aid of Qi's prefect Zhu Wei (朱威). In spring 894, however, Zhu Quanzhong personally engaged them and defeated them, killing more than 10,000 Tianping and Taining soldiers. Zhu Xuan and Zhu Jin were forced to seek aid from Li Keyong, who sent a small group of elite cavalry soldiers, commanded by his officer An Fushun (安福順) and An Fushun's brothers An Fuqing (安福慶) and An Fuqian (安福遷), to aid Zhu Xuan and Zhu Jin. However, in 895, when Zhu Quanzhong sent his adoptive son Zhu Yougong (朱友恭) to put Taining's capital Yan Prefecture (兗州) under siege and Zhu Xuan tried to aid Zhu Jin, they were ambushed by Zhu Yougong, and An Fushun and An Fuqing were captured. Zhu Quanzhong then personally arrived and defeated Zhu Xuan, forcing Zhu Xuan to return to Yun.

Later in the year, Zhu Xuan attempted to again force Zhu Quanzhong to lift the siege on Yan, by sending his officers He Gui and Liu Cun (柳存), along with Li Keyong's officer He Huaibao (何懷寶), to attack Cao Prefecture, which had fallen into Zhu Quanzhong's hands by this point. Zhu Quanzhong heard this, and, without Tianping forces' knowledge, set a trap for them and ambushed them; he slaughtered the Tianping soldiers and captured He Gui, Liu, and He Huaibao. He showed them to Zhu Jin and stated to Zhu Jin, "Your cousin has already been defeated. Why not surrender?" Zhu Jin offered to do so, but requested that Zhu Quanzhong send Zhu Xuan's and Zhu Jin's cousin Zhu Qiong (朱瓊), who earlier that year had surrendered Qi Prefecture to Zhu Quanzhong, to take control of the Taining circuit seal (signifying surrender of authority). When Zhu Qiong prepared to enter the city, however, Zhu Jin ambushed him and killed him. With his morale deflated, Zhu Quanzhong withdrew. By this point, however, with the constant campaigns against Zhu Quanzhong, it was said that both Tianping and Taining Circuits had been laid waste, with the people unable to grow crops and the circuit treasuries expended. Zhu Xuan and Zhu Jin again thought aid from Li Keyong, and Li Keyong sent the officers Shi Yan (史儼) and Li Chengsi (李承嗣) to aid them, getting permission from Le Xingda's successor Luo Hongxin for passage through Weibo Circuit. In 896, Li Keyong tried to send more reinforcement through Weibo again, commanded by his adoptive son Li Cunxin. However, Li Cunxin angered Luo by allowing his soldiers to pillage the Weibo countryside, and Luo ambushed and defeated him. When Li Keyong personally attacked Luo, a joint force of Luo's and Zhu Quanzhong's defeated Li Keyong. With the path from Hedong thus cut off, no further reinforcement from Li Keyong could arrive, and it was said that thereafter, the situation became hopeless for Tianping and Taining.

== Defeat and death ==
In 897, Zhu Quanzhong's officers Ge Congzhou and Pang Shigu (龐師古) jointly again sieged Yun Prefecture. Zhu Xuan ran out of food supplies and decided to dig a deep moat around the city for defensive purposes only, not intending to again engage Zhu Quanzhong's forces. However, Pang soon built a mobile bridge over the moat and crossed it in the dark. He captured the city, forcing Zhu Xuan to flee. When Zhu Xuan reached Zhongdu (中都, in modern Tai'an), the people in the countryside captured him and his wife Lady Rong, and surrendered them to Ge. Zhu Quanzhong subsequently executed Zhu Xuan at Xuanwu's capital Bian Prefecture (汴州) and took Lady Rong as a concubine. Zhu Jin, meanwhile, could also not hold Taining, and he fled, along with Shi and Li Chengsi, south to Huainan Circuit (淮南, headquartered in modern Yangzhou, Jiangsu) to submit to Huainan's military governor Yang Xingmi, allowing Zhu Quanzhong to take over the entire Yellow River-Huai River region.

== Notes and references ==
- Old Book of Tang, vol. 182.
- New Book of Tang, vol. 188.
- History of the Five Dynasties, vol. 13.
- New History of the Five Dynasties, vol. 42.
- Zizhi Tongjian, vols. 255, 256, 257, 258, 259, 260, 261.
