= Le Yanzhen =

Le Yanzhen (Chinese: 樂彥禎) (d. 888), né Le Xingda (樂行達), was a warlord late in the Chinese dynasty Tang dynasty, who ruled Weibo Circuit (魏博, headquartered in modern Handan, Hebei) as its military governor (Jiedushi) from 883 to 888.

== Background ==
It is not known when Le Xingda was born, but it is known that he was from Weibo Circuit's capital Wei Prefecture (魏州). His father Le Shaoji (樂少寂) was also a Weibo officer, and had successively served as prefect of three of Weibo's prefectures — Chan (澶州, in modern Anyang, Henan), Bo (博州, in modern Liaocheng, Shandong), and Bei (貝州, in modern Xingtai, Hebei). Le Xingda became a Weibo officer in his youth. After Han Jian became military governor, Le Xingda was promoted, and later became the prefect of Bo Prefecture. After Han briefly captured Heyang Circuit (河陽, headquartered in modern Jiaozuo, Henan) in 882 and forced Heyang's military governor Zhuge Shuang to flee, as Le contributed to the victory, Han made him the prefect of Chan Prefecture.

In 883, while Han was attacking Tianping Circuit (天平, headquartered in modern Tai'an, Shandong), Zhuge took the opportunity to retake Heyang by surprise. Han, hearing of this, made peace with Tianping's acting military governor Zhu Xuan and attacked Heyang again, but was defeated by Zhuge's general Li Hanzhi. After Han's defeat, Le surprised Han by heading for Wei Prefecture in advance of Han and occupying it. The Weibo soldiers supported him to replace Han, who was subsequently killed by his own soldiers. Then-reigning Emperor Xizong thereafter confirmed Le as the acting military governor, and later in the year full military governor.

== As military governor ==
In 884, Emperor Xizong gave Le Xingda a new name of Yanzhen. Emperor Xizong also granted him the honorary title of Zuo Pushe (左僕射) and the honorary chancellor designation of Tong Zhongshu Menxia Pingzhangshi (同中書門下平章事).

It was said that Le Yanzhen was arrogant and unrestrained in his behavior. Once he was firm in his position as military governor of Weibo, he conscripted the people to build an inner city wall in Wei Prefecture and to rebuild the Yellow River levee, requiring both projects to be done within a month and drawing resentment from the people. Further, his son Le Congxun (樂從訓) was said to be violent and greedy. Late in 884, when the former chancellor Wang Duo was set to report to Yichang Circuit (義昌, headquartered in modern Cangzhou, Hebei) to serve as its military governor, Wang went through Weibo Circuit. Le Congxun, enticed by the large group of women accompanying Wang and the display of wealth, gathered several hundred men and laid an ambush for Wang, killing him and some 300 staff members, seizing Wang's wealth and women. Le Yanzhen reported to the imperial government that Wang had been killed by bandits, and the imperial government, having been recently severely weakened by the rebellion of the agrarian rebel Huang Chao, was unable to investigate further. It was said that the people of Weibo had long heard of Wang's good reputation and regretted his death, and thereafter viewed Le Congxun poorly. Still, despite Wang's death, the imperial government thereafter granted the honorary titles of Kaifu Yitong Sansi (開府儀同三司) and Situ (司徒, one of the Three Excellencies) on Le Yanzhen.

In 885, Ma Shuang (馬爽), an officer at neighboring Zhaoyi Circuit (昭義, then-headquartered in modern Xingtai), rose in rebellion against Zhaoyi's military governor Meng Fangli, trying to force Meng to kill fellow officer Xi Zhongxin (奚忠信), with whom Ma had a dispute. However, Ma was soon defeated and forced to flee to Weibo. Xi thereafter bribed Le Yanzhen to have Ma killed.

== Retirement and death ==
By 888, the people of Weibo had become disgruntled about Le Yanzhen's rule, and the veteran Weibo soldiers were apprehensive that Le Congxun had gathered a group of several hundred soldiers to serve as his personal guards, calling them "the Son's officers" (子將). Le Congxun detected the Weibo soldiers' apprehensions about him, and became so insecure that he fled out of Wei Prefecture. Le Yanzhen thereafter made him the prefect of Xiang Prefecture (相州, in modern Handan). Le Congxun thereafter frequently sent messengers to Wei Prefecture to take armors and treasures from Wei to Xiang, drawing further apprehension from the Weibo veterans. Le Yanzhen, fearing that the veterans would mutiny, offered to resign and become a Buddhist monk at Longxing Temple (龍興寺). (In this disturbance, Lei Ye (雷鄴), an emissary from Zhu Quanzhong the military governor of neighboring Xuanwu Circuit (宣武, headquartered in modern Kaifeng, Henan), who was at Weibo to negotiate a purchase of food supplies from Le Yanzhen, was killed.)

The soldiers thereafter supported the officer Zhao Wenbian (趙文㺹) to serve as acting military governor. Le Congxun, meanwhile, hearing about his father's forced retirement, took some 30,000 soldiers and advanced to Wei Prefecture. Zhao refused to engage Le Congxun. The Weibo soldiers, uncertain of what Zhao's intentions were, killed him and supported another officer, Luo Hongxin. Luo engaged Le Congxun and defeated him, forcing him to retreat to Neihuang (內黃, in modern Anyang). The Weibo forces put Neihuang under siege. Because the Weibo soldiers had killed Lei, Le Congxun decided to seek aid from Zhu. Zhu sent his officer Zhu Zhen (朱珍) north, capturing three Weibo cities and advancing to Neihuang, where he initially defeated Weibo forces. However, when Le Congxun subsequently tried to fight out of the siege, Luo's officer Cheng Gongxin (程公信) attacked and killed him. Subsequently, Le Yanzhen was also executed, and both his head and his son's were publicly displayed on the gate to the Weibo camp. Luo subsequently sent messengers to apologize to Zhu Quanzhong and offer him gifts, so Zhu Quanzhong withdrew his forces, allowing Luo to take over Weibo without further opposition.

== Notes and references ==
- Old Book of Tang, vol. 181.
- New Book of Tang, vol. 210.
- Zizhi Tongjian, vols. 255, 256, 257.
