= Old History of the Five Dynasties =

Official history of Song dynasty China

- Author: Xue Juzheng et al.
- Original title: 五代史
- Language: Classical Chinese
- Genre: Chinese historiography
- Publication date: 974
- Publication place: China (Song dynasty)
- Original text: 五代史 at Chinese Wikisource

Old History of the Five Dynasties
- Traditional Chinese: 舊五代史
- Simplified Chinese: 旧五代史
Transcriptions
Standard Mandarin
- Hanyu Pinyin: Jiù Wǔdài Shǐ
Southern Min
- Hokkien POJ: Kū Ngó͘-tāi-sú

The Old History of the Five Dynasties (Chinese: 舊五代史; pinyin: Jiù Wǔdài Shǐ) was an official history of the Five Dynasties era (907–960), which controlled much of northern China. It was compiled by the Song dynasty official-scholar Xue Juzheng in the first two decades of the Song dynasty, which was founded in 960. It is one of the Twenty-Four Histories recognized through Chinese history.

The book comprises 150 chapters, and was in effect divided into 7 books, they are: Book of Liang (24 volumes), Book of Tang (50 volumes), Book of Jin (24 volumes), Book of Han (11 volumes), Book of Zhou (22 volumes), Liezhuan (7 volumes) and Zhi (12 volumes), respectively. After the New History of the Five Dynasties by Ouyang Xiu was published, it was no longer popular. In the 12th century it was removed from the Imperial Library and was no longer published by order of the Jin dynasty. The book was lost during this period.

During the 18th century, Qing dynasty scholars found many complete quotes of the book in Yongle Da Dian. They extracted them and together with other sources of the same period, they were able to largely reconstruct the book, although missing a few chapters. Despite rumours that copies of the original book exist, none have been found.

== Purpose ==
The primary purpose of The Five Dynasties History was to establish the claim of the Song dynasty to the Mandate of Heaven, essentially the divine right to rule the Chinese realm. The Song dynasty took over control of northern China from the last of the Five Dynasties, the Later Zhou. From there, they conquered southern China to eventually rule all but the northern fringe of China known as the Sixteen Prefectures, which was under the control of the Khitan Liao dynasty. Xue sought to establish the claim of the Song dynasty to the Mandate of Heaven through the succession of the Five Dynasties.

Xue argued that as each of these five dynasties controlled the traditional heart of China and held territory vastly larger than any of the kingdoms to the south, the Mandate naturally flowed through these dynasties.

=== Issues ===
In establishing the path of the Mandate through from the Tang dynasty to the Song dynasty through the Five Dynasties, there are several issues that Xue Zhucheng had to address. The first of these was the brutality exercised by the Later Liang, the first of the five dynasties. Zhu Wen's brutality led many to want to exclude that dynasty from the Mandate of Heaven due to the requirement that the leader work with benevolence.

Another issue had to do with the middle three, the Later Tang, Later Jin, and Later Han respectively. None of these were Han Chinese ruled dynasties, but were led by Shatuo.

The final major hurdle was related to the ability to rule all of China. While each of these five dynasties held more territory than any of the other Chinese polities of the era, none of them had a realistic chance of conquering the southern kingdoms and uniting the entire realm.

== Legacy ==
Xue's work provides valuable historical information regarding the Five Dynasties that ruled most of northern China from 907 to 960, relied on by historians today for much of what is known about this period of Chinese history.

However, another legacy of the book is the use of official histories to strengthen claims to the Mandate of Heaven, including the bending of historical fact to suit the needs of the patron dynasty. Although this was not the first instance of distorting history to legitimize ruling claims (both within and outside China), the work strengthened this trend in Chinese history.

In addition, the book was used to legitimize foreign dynasties, which set up the justification for later conquest dynasties that would control much of China's destiny for most of the next millennium.

== Catalogue ==
=== Book of Liang ===
- Volume 001 Book of Liang 1 Taizu Benji 1 – Zhu Wen
- Volume 002 Book of Liang 2 Taizu Benji 2 – Zhu Wen
- Volume 003 Book of Liang 3 Taizu Benji 3 – Zhu Wen
- Volume 004 Book of Liang 4 Taizu Benji 4 – Zhu Wen
- Volume 005 Book of Liang 5 Taizu Benji 5 – Zhu Wen
- Volume 006 Book of Liang 6 Taizu Benji 6 – Zhu Wen
- Volume 007 Book of Liang 7 Taizu Benji 7 – Zhu Wen
- Volume 008 Book of Liang 8 Modi Benji 1 – Zhu Youzhen
- volume009 Book of Liang 9 Modi Benji 2 – Zhu Youzhen
- Volume 010 Book of Liang 10 Modi Benji 3 – Zhu Youzhen
- Volume 011 Book of Liang 11 Consort Liezhuan 1 – Empress Dowager Wenhui of the Wang clan (文惠王太后, Empress Yuanzhen of the Zhang clan, Consort De of the Zhang clan (张德妃)
- Volume 012 Book of Liang 12 Imperial family Liezhuan 2 – The Prince of Guang, Zhu Quanyu (朱全昱); the Prince of Heng, Zhu Youliang (朱友谅); the Prince of Hui, Zhu Youneng (朱友能); the Prince of Shao, Zhu Youhui (朱友诲); the Prince of An, Zhu Youning (朱友宁); the Prince of Mi, Zhu Youlun (朱友伦); the Prince of Chen, Zhu Youyu (朱友裕); the Prince of Bo, Zhu Youwen (朱友); Shuren (commoner) Zhu Yougui; the Prince of Fu, Zhu Youwen (朱友璋); the Prince of He, Zhu Youyong (朱友雍); the Prince of Jian, Zhu Youhui (朱友徽); the Prince of Kang, Zhu Younzi (朱友徽)
- Volume 013 Book of Liang 13 Liezhuan 3 – Zhu Xuan, Zhu Jin, Shi Pu, Wang Shifan, Liu Zhijun, Yang Chongben, Jiang Yin, Zhang Wanjin (张万进)
- Volume 014 Book of Liang 14 Liezhuan 4 – Luo Shaowei, Zhao Xun, Wang Ke
- Volume 015 Book of Liang 15 Liezhuan 5 – Han Jian, Li Hanzhi, Feng Xingjian (冯行袭), Sun Dezhao (孙德昭), Zhao Keyu (赵克遇), Zhang Shensi (张慎思)
- Volume 016 Book of Liang 16 Liezhuan 6 – Ge Congzhou, Xie Yanzhang (谢彦章), Hu Zhen (胡真), Zhang Guiba, Zhang Guihou, Zhang Guibian
- Volume 017 Book of Liang 17 Liezhuan 7 – Cheng Rui, Du Hong, Zhong Chuan, Tian Jun, Zhu Yanshou, Zhao Kuangning, Zhang Ji, Lei Man
- Volume 018 Book of Liang 18 Liezhuan 8 – Zhang Wenwei, Xue Yiru, Zhang Ce, Du Xiao, Jing Xiang, Li Zhen
- Volume 019 Book of Liang 19 Liezhuan 9 – Shi Shucong, Zhu Yougong, Wang Chongshi, Zhu Zhen, Li Si'an, Deng Jiyun, Huang Wenjing, Hu Gui, Li Dang, Li Chongyin, Fan Jushi
- Volume 020 Book of Liang 20 Liezhuan 10 – Xie Xie, Sima Ye, Liu Han, Wang Jingmai, Gao Shao, Ma Jixun, Zhang Cunjing, Kou Yanqing
- Volume 021 Book of Liang 21 Liezhuan 11 – Pang Shigu, Huo Cun, Fu Daozhao, Xu Huaiyu, Guo Yan, Li Tangbin, Wang Qianyu, Liu Kangzhang, Wang Yanzhang, He Delun
- Volume 022 Book of Liang 22 Liezhuan 12 – Yang Shihou, Niu Cunjie, Wang Tan
- Volume 023 Book of Liang 23 Liezhuan 13 – Liu Xun, He Gai, Kang Huaiying, Wang Jingren
- Volume 024 Book of Liang 24 Liezhuan 14 – Li Ting, Lu Zeng, Sun Lian, Zhang Jun, Zhang Yan, Du Xunhe, Luo Yin, Qiu Yin, Duan Shen

=== Book of Tang ===
- Volume 025 Book of Tang 1 Wuhuang Benji 1 – Li Keyong
- Volume 026 Book of Tang 2 Wuhuang Benji 2 – Li Keyong
- Volume 027 Book of Tang 3 Zhuangzong Benji 1 – Li Cunxu
- Volume 028 Book of Tang 4 Zhuangzong Benji 2 – Li Cunxu
- Volume 029 Book of Tang 5 Zhuangzong Benji 3 – Li Cunxu
- Volume 030 Book of Tang 6 Zhuangzong Benji 4 – Li Cunxu
- Volume 031 Book of Tang 7 Zhuangzong Benji 5 – Li Cunxu
- Volume 032 Book of Tang 8 Zhuangzong Benji 6 – Li Cunxu
- Volume 033 Book of Tang 9 Zhuangzong Benji 7 – Li Cunxu
- Volume 034 Book of Tang 10 Zhuangzong Benji 8 – Li Cunxu
- Volume 035 Book of Tang 11 Mingzong Benji 1 – Li Siyuan
- Volume 036 Book of Tang 12 Mingzong Benji 2 – Li Siyuan
- Volume 037 Book of Tang 13 Mingzong Benji 3 – Li Siyuan
- Volume 038 Book of Tang 14 Mingzong Benji 4 – Li Siyuan
- Volume 039 Book of Tang 15 Mingzong Benji 5 – Li Siyuan
- Volume 040 Book of Tang 16 Mingzong Benji 6 – Li Siyuan
- Volume 041 Book of Tang 17 Mingzong Benji 7 – Li Siyuan
- Volume 042 Book of Tang 18 Mingzong Benji 8 – Li Siyuan
- Volume 043 Book of Tang 19 Mingzong Benji 9 – Li Siyuan
- Volume 044 Book of Tang 20 Mingzong Benji 10 – Li Siyuan
- Volume 045 Book of Tang 21 Mindi Benji 1 – Li Conghou
- Volume 046 Book of Tang 22 Zhuangzong Benji 1 – Li Congke
- Volume 047 Book of Tang 23 Zhuangzong Benji 2 – Li Congke
- Volume 048 Book of Tang 24 Zhuangzong Benji 3 – Li Congke
- Volume 049 Book of Tang 25 Consort Liezhuan 1 – Empress Zhenjian, of the Cao clan; Consort Liu; Lady Wei, of the Chen clan; Empress Shenmin, of the Liu clan; Consort Shu, of the Han clan; Consort Yide; Empress Zhaoyi, of the Xia clan; Empress Hewu, of the Cao clan; Empress Xuanxian, of the Wei clan; Empress Kong; Empress Liu
- Volume 050 Book of Tang 26 Liezhuan 2 – Imperial family 1
- Volume 050 Book of Tang 27 Liezhuan 3 – Imperial family 2
- Volume 052 Book of Tang 28 Liezhuan 4 – Li Sizhao, Peiyue, Li Siben, Li Sien
- Volume 053 Book of Tang 29 Liezhuan 5 – Li Cunxin, Li Cunxiao, Li Cunjin, Li Cunzhang, Li Cunxian
- Volume 054 Book of Tang 30 Liezhuan 6 – Wang Rong, Wang Zhaohui, Wang Chuzhi
- Volume 055 Book of Tang 31 Liezhuan 7 – Kang Junli, Xue Zhiqin, Shi Jianjian, Li Chengsi, Shi Yan, Gai Yu, Yi Guang, Li Chengxun, Shi Jingrong
- Volume 056 Book of Tang 32 Liezhuan 8 – Zhou Dewei, Fu Cunshen
- Volume 057 Book of Tang 33 Liezhuan 9 – Guo Chongtao
- Volume 058 Book of Tang 34 Liezhuan 10 – Zhao Guangfeng, Zheng Jue, Cui Xie, Li Qi, Xiao Qin
- Volume 059 Book of Tang 35 Liezhuan 11 – Ding Hui, Yan Bao, Fu Xi, Wu Zhen, Wang Zan, Yuan Xianxian, Zhang Wen, Li Shaowen
- Volume 060 Book of Tang 36 Liezhuan 12 – Li Xiji, Wang Jian, Li Jingyi, Lu Rupil, Li Dehuo, Su Zhuan
- Volume 061 Book of Tang 37 Liezhuan 13 – An Jinquan, An Yuanxin, An Chongba, Liu Xun, Zhang Jingxun, Liu Yanzong, Yuan Jianfeng, Xifang Ye, Zhang Zunhui, Sun Zhang
- Volume 062 Book of Tang 38 Liezhuan 14 – Meng Fangli, Zhang Wenli, Dong Zhang
- Volume 063 Book of Tang 39 Liezhuan 15 – Zhang Quanyi, Zhu Youqian
- Volume 064 Book of Tang 40 Liezhuan 16 – Huo Yanwei, Wang Yanqiu, Dai Siyuan, Zhu Hanbin, Kong Qian, Liu Jang, and Zhou Zhiyu
- Volume 065 Book of Tang 41 Liezhuan 17 – Li Jianhe, Shi Junli, Gao Xinggui, Zhang Tingyu, Wang Sitong, Suo Zitong
- Volume 066 Book of Tang 42 Liezhuan 18 – An Chongzhi, Zhu Hongzhao, Zhu Hongsi, Kang Yicheng, Yayanchou, Song Lingxun
- Volume 067 Book of Tang 43 Liezhuan 19 – Doulu Ge, Wei Shao, Lu Cheng, Zhao Feng, Li Yu, Ren Huon
- Volume 068 Book of Tang 44 Liezhuan 20 – Xue Tinggui, Cui Yi, Liu Yue, Feng Shunqing, Dou Mengbi, Li Boyin, Gui Ai, Kong Miao, Zhang Wenbao, Chen Miao, Liu Zan
- Volume 069 Book of Tang 45 Liezhuan 21 – Zhang Xian, Wang Zhengyan, Hu Zhan, Cui Yisun, Meng Gong, Sun Yue, Zhang Yanlang, Liu Yanhao, Liu Yanlang
- Volume 070 Book of Tang 46 Liezhuan 22 – Yuan Xingqin, Xia Luqi, Yao Hong, Li Yan, Li Renru, Kang Sili, Zhang Jingda
- Volume 071 Book of Tang 47 Liezhuan 23 – Ma Yu, Sikong Ting, Cao Tingyin, Xiao Xifu, Yao Zhongzhi, Jia Fu, Ma Yai, Luo Guan, Chunyu Yan, Zhang Ge, Xu Sil, Zhou Xuanbao
- Volume 072,Book of Tang 48 Liezhuan 24 – Zhang Chengye, Zhang Juhan, Ma Shaohong, Meng Hanqiong
- Volume 073 Book of Tang 49 Liezhuan 25 – Mao Zhang, Nie Yu, Wen Tao, Duan Ning, Kong Qian, Li Ye
- Volume 074 Book of Tang 50 Liezhuan 26 – Kang Yanxiao, Zhu Shuyin, Yang Li, Dou Tingwan, Zhang Qizhao, Yang Yanwen

=== Book of Jin ===
- Volume 075 Book of Jin 1 Gaozu Benji 1 – Shi Jingtang
- Volume 076 Book of Jin 2 Gaozu Benji 2 – Shi Jingtang
- Volume 077 Book of Jin 3 Gaozu Benji 3 – Shi Jingtang
- Volume 078 Book of Jin 4 Gaozu Benji 4 – Shi Jingtang
- Volume 079 Book of Jin 5 Gaozu Benji 5 – Shi Jingtang
- Volume 080 Book of Jin 6 Gaozu Benji 6 – Shi Jingtang
- Volume 081 Book of Jin 7 Shaodi Benji 1 – Shi Chonggui
- Volume 082 Book of Jin 8 Shaodi Benji 2 – Shi Chonggui
- Volume 083 Book of Jin 9 Shaodi Benji 3 – Shi Chonggui
- Volume 084 Book of Jin 10 Shaodi Benji 4 – Shi Chonggui
- Volume 085 Book of Jin 11 Shaodi Benji 5 – Shi Chonggui
- Volume 086 Book of Jin 12 Consort Liezhuan 1 – Empress Li, Taifei (Imperial consort, similar to dowager) An, Empress Zhang, Empress Feng
- Volume 087 Book of Jin 13 Liezhuan 2 – Imperial family
- Volume 088 Book of Jin 14 Liezhuan 3 – Jing Yanguang, Li Yantao, Zhang Xichong, Wang Tingyin, Shi Kuanghan, Liang Hanyong, Yang Siquan, Yin Hui, Li Congzhang, Li Congwen, Zhang Wanjin
- Volume 089 Book of Jin 15 Liezhuan 4 – Sang Weihan, Zhao Ying, Liu Zhu, Feng Yu, Yin Peng
- Volume 090 Book of Jin 16 Liezhuan 5 -Zhao Zaili, Ma Quanjie, Zhang Yun, Hua Wenqi, An Chongruan, Yang Yanxun, Li Chengyue, Lu Siduo, An Yuanxin, Zhang Lang, Lee Deliu, Tian Wu, Li Chengfu Chengfu Sangrijin
- Volume 090 Book of Jin 17 Liezhuan 6 – Fang Zhiwen, Wang Jianli, Kangfu, An Yanwei, Li Zhou, Zhang Congxun, Li Jizhong, Li Qing, Zhou Guangfu, Fu Yan, Luo Zhoujing, Zheng Cong
- Volume 090 Book of Jin 18 Liezhuan 7 – Yao Yi, Lu Qi, Liang Wenju, Shi Gui, Pei Zuo, Wu Chengfan, Lu Dao, Zheng Taoguang, Wang Quan, Han Yun, Li Yi
- Volume 090 Book of Jin 19 Liezhuan 8 – Lu Zhi, Li Zhuanmei, Lu Zhan, Cui Chan, Xue Rong, Cao Guozhen, Zhang Renyuan, Zhao Xi, Li Xie, Yin Yuyu, Zheng Yunshou
- Volume 090 Book of Jin 20 Liezhuan 9 – Chang Congjian, Pan Huan, Fang Tai, He Jian, Zhang Tingyun, Guo Yanlu, Guo Jinhai, Liu Churang, Li Qiong, Gao Hanyun, Sun Yantao, Wang Bao, Miqiong, Li Yanxun
- Volume 090 Book of Jin 21 Liezhuan 10 – Huangfu Yu, Wang Qing, Liang Hanzhang, Bai Fengjin, Lu Shunmi, Zhou Huan, Shen Yun, Wu Yan, Zhai Zhang, Cheng Fuyun, Guo Lin
- Volume 096 Book of Jin 22 Liezhuan 11 – Kong Chongbi, Chen Baoji, Wang Yu, Zhang Jizuo, Zheng Ruan, Hu Rao, Liu Suiqing, Fang Hao, Meng Chengxun, Liu Jixun, Zheng Yiyi, Cheng Xun, Li Yu, Zheng Xuansu, Ma Chongji, Chen Xuan
- Volume 097 Book of Jin 23 Liezhuan 12 – Fan Yanguang, Zhang Congbin, Zhang Yanbo, Yang Guangyuan, Lu Wenjin, Li Jinquan
- Volume 098 Book of Jin 24 Liezhuan 13 – An Chongrong, An Congjin, Zhang Yanze, Zhao Dejun, Zhang Li, Xiao Han, Liu Xi, Cui Tingxun

=== Book of Han ===
- Volume 099 Book of Han 1 Gaozu Benji 1 – Liu Zhiyuan
- Volume 100 Book of Han 2 Gaozu Benji 2 – Liu Zhiyuan
- Volume 101 Book of Han 3 Yindi Benji 1 – Liu Chengyou
- Volume 102 Book of Han 4 Yindi Benji 2 – Liu Chengyou
- Volume 103 Book of Han 5 Yindi Benji 3 – Liu Chengyou
- Volume 104 Book of Han 6 Consort Liezhuan 1
- Volume 105 Book of Han 7 Imperial family Liezhuan 2
- Volume 106 Book of Han 8 Liezhuan 3 – Wang Zhou, Liu Shenjiao, Wu Hanqiu, Zhang Rong, Li Yin, Liu Zaiming, Ma Wan, Li Yancong, Guo Jin, Huangfu Li, Bai Zairong, Zhang Peng
- Volume 107 Book of Han 9 Liezhuan 4 – Shi Hongzhao, Yang Fei, Wang Zhang, Li Hongjian, Yan Jinqing, Nie Wenjin, Hou Zan, Guo Yunming, Liu Zhu
- Volume 108 Book of Han 10 Liezhuan 5 – Li Song, Su Fengji, Li Lin, Long Min, Liu Ding, Zhang Yun, Ren Yanhao
- Volume 109 Book of Han 11 Liezhuan 6 – Du Chongwei, Li Shouzhe, Zhao Siwan

=== Book of Zhou ===
- Volume 110 Book of Zhou 1 Taizu Benji 1 – Guo Wei
- Volume 111 Book of Zhou 2 Taizu Benji 2 – Guo Wei
- Volume 112 Book of Zhou 3 Taizu Benji 3 – Guo Wei
- Volume 113 Book of Zhou 4 Taizu Benji 4 – Guo Wei
- Volume 114 Book of Zhou 5 Shizong Benji 1 – Chai Rong
- Volume 115 Book of Zhou 6 Shizong Benji 3 – Chai Rong
- Volume 116 Book of Zhou 7 Shizong Benji 3 – Chai Rong
- Volume 117 Book of Zhou 8 Shizong Benji 4 – Chai Rong
- Volume 118 Book of Zhou 9 Shizong Benji 5 – Chai Rong
- Volume 119 Book of Zhou 10 Shizong Benji 6 – Chai Rong
- Volume 120 Book of Zhou 11 Gongdi Benji 1 – Chai Zongxun
- Volume 121 Book of Zhou 12 Consort Liezhuan 1
- Volume 122 Book of Zhou 13 Imperial Liezhuan 2
- Volume 123 Book of Zhou 14 Liezhuan 3 – Gao Xingzhou, An Shenqi, An Shenhui, An Shenxin, Li Congmin, Zheng Renhui, Zhang Yancheng, An Shuqian, Song Yanyun
- Volume 124 Book of Zhou 15 Liezhuan 4 – Wang Yin, He Fujin, Liu Ci, Wang Jin, Shi Yanchao, Shi Yi, Wang Lingwen, Zhou Mi, Li Huaizhong, Bai Wenke, Bai Yanyu, Tang Jingsi
- Volume 125 Book of Zhou 16 Liezhuan 5 – Zhao Hui, Wang Shouen, Kong Zhijun, Wang Jihong, Feng Hui, Gao Yunquan, Zhecong Ruan, Wang Rao, Sun Fangjian
- Volume 126 Book of Zhou 17 Liezhuan 6 – Feng Dao
- Volume 127 Book of Zhou 18 Liezhuan 7 – Lu Wenji, Ma Yisun, He Ning, Su Yugui, Jing Fan
- Volume 128 Book of Zhou 19 Liezhuan 8 – Wang Pu, Yang Ningshi, Xue Renqian, Xiao Yuan, Lu Xie, Wang Renyu, Pei Yu, Duan Xiyao, Situ Xu, Bian Wei, Wang Min
- Volume 129 Book of Zhou 20 Liezhuan 9 – Chang Si, Zhai Guangye, Cao Ying, Li Yan, Li Hui, Li Jianchong, Wang Chongyi, Sun Hanying, Xu Qian, Zhao Feng, Qi Zangzhen, Wang Huan, Zhang Yanchao, Zhang Ying, Liu Rengan
- Volume 130 Book of Zhou 21 Liezhuan 10 – Wang Jun, Murong Yanchao, Yan Honglu, Cui Zhoudu
- Volume 131 Book of Zhou 22 Liezhuan 11 – Liu Zuo, Zhang Gan, Zhang Kefu, Yu Dechen, Wang Yan, Shen Wenbing, Hu Zai, Liu Gang, Jia Wei, Zhao Yanyi, Shen Yan, Li Zhiyu, Sun Sheng

=== Liezhuan ===
- Volume 132 Hereditary successors Liezhuan 1 – Li Maozhen, Gao Wanxing, Han Xun, Li Renfu
- Volume 133 Hereditary successors Liezhuan 2 – Gao Jixing, Ma Yin, Liu Yan, Qian Liu
- Volume 134 Jiewei (literally 'illegal independent Kingdom') Liezhuan 1 – Yang Xingmi, Li Bian, Wang Shenzhi
- Volume 135 Jiewei Liezhuan 2 – Liu Shouguang, Liu Zhi, Liu Chong
- Volume 136 Jiewei Liezhuan 3 – Wang Jian, Meng Zhixiang
- Volume 137 Foreign Liezhuan 1 – Khitan
- Volume 138 Foreign Liezhuan 2 – Tibet, Uighur, Goryeo, Bohai Mohe, Heishui Mohe, Silla, Dangxiang, Kunming Tribe, Khotan, Kingdom of Khotan, Zangke Tribe (牂柯蛮)

=== Zhi (Document) ===
- Volume 139 Astronomy Zhi
- Volume 140 Calendar Zhi
- Volume 141 Wuxing Zhi
- Volume 142 Etiquette Zhi 1
- Volume 143 Etiquette Zhi 2
- Volume 144 Music Zhi
- Volume 145 Music Zhi
- Volume 146 Food and freight Zhi
- Volume 147 Criminal law Zhi
- Volume 148 Xuanju (Selecting Juren) Zhi
- Volume 149 Zhiguan (official) Zhi
- Volume 150 Commandery and county Zhi
