= The Heroic Ones =

1970 Hong Kong film by Chang Cheh

- Movie poster
- Chinese: 十三太保
- Literal meaning: Thirteen Grand Guardians
- Hanyu Pinyin: Shísān Tàibǎo
- Directed by: Chang Cheh
- Written by: Chang Cheh; Ni Kuang
- Produced by: Run Run Shaw
- Starring: David Chiang; Chin Han; Ti Lung; Lily Li; Nam Seok-hun; Wang Chung; Ku Feng; Chan Sing
- Cinematography: Kung Mu-to
- Edited by: Chiang Hsing-lung
- Music by: Wang Fu-ling
- Distributed by: Shaw Brothers Studio
- Release date: 14 August 1970
- Running time: 121 minutes
- Country: Hong Kong
- Language: Mandarin

The Heroic Ones (Chinese: 十三太保; pinyin: Shísān Tàibǎo; lit. 'Thirteen Grand Guardians') is a 1970 Hong Kong Shaw Brothers Studio martial arts film directed by Chang Cheh. It was originally released on 14 August 1970 in Hong Kong and was one of the top grossing Hong Kong films between the years of 1970 and 1972.

== Plot ==
In 880s imperial China, the Tang dynasty court no longer had effective control of its empire, and the national capital Chang'an was sacked by Huang Chao's anti-government army. Li Keyong, a Shatuo chieftain loyal to the Tang cause, led his troops to suppress the rebellion. His 13 generals—essentially all adopted sons—helped expel Huang from Chang'an, although a rift between some of them became more and more apparent in the process. Following the victory, Li Keyong accepted an invitation for a banquet at military governor Zhu Wen's territory of Bianliang, unaware that it was a trap to assassinate him.

== Cast and characters ==
- Ku Feng as Li Keyong, Prince of Jin
- Chin Han as Li Siyuan, Li Keyong's 1st general
- Pao Chia-win as Li Sizhao, Li Keyong's 2nd general
- Lo Wei as Li Cunxu, Li Keyong's 3rd general
- Nam Seok-hun as Li Cunxin, Li Keyong's 4th general
- Liu Kang as Li Cunzhi, Li Keyong's 5th general
- Sung Yuan as Li Cunke, Li Keyong's 6th general
- Huang Pei-chi as Li Cunjin, Li Keyong's 7th general
- Wang Kuang-yu as Li Cunzhang, Li Keyong's 8th general
- Chen Chuan as Li Cunshen, Li Keyong's 9th general
- Lau Kar-wing as Li Cunshou, Li Keyong's 10th general
- Ti Lung as Shi Jingsi, Li Keyong's 11th general
- Wang Chung as Kang Junli, Li Keyong's 12th general
- David Chiang as Li Cunxiao, Li Keyong's 13th general
- Chan Sing as Zhu Wen, the Bianliang governor (he was an officer under Huang Chao before he surrendered to the Tang government)
- Lee Hae-ryong as Huang Chao, the rebel leader, self-proclaimed Qi emperor
- Bolo Yeung as Meng Juehai, Huang's general
- Jin Bong-jin as Zhang Quan, Huang's general
- Lily Li as Cuiyan, a young woman in Chang'an

== Deviations from history ==
Some events in the film are loosely based on history, such as Li Keyong's troops expelling Huang Chao from Chang'an in the summer of 883, and Zhu Wen's failed assassination attempt of Li Keyong a year later that took the lives of Shi Jingsi and many others. However, many other events have been fictionalized. While Li Cunxiao did in fact have a strained relationship with Li Cunxin and Kang Junli and did die by dismemberment, he was actually the one who betrayed Li Keyong, who eventually executed him. Except for Kang who was killed by Li Keyong in relation to Li Cunxiao's death, no other general died from infighting.

In history, Shi and Kang were not adopted sons of Li Keyong, hence their different surnames from the other generals, in fact Kang was Li Keyong's senior by 9 years. Li Cunjin was one of the oldest adopted sons, and both Li Cunxin and Li Cunshen were older than Li Siyuan, and quite possibly Li Sizhao and Li Cunzhang as well. Li Cunxu, a few dozen years younger than most of his adoptive brothers, was not even born in 883-884. Li Keyong was not created "Prince of Jin" until 895, a good 12 years after expelling Huang Chao from Chang'an. Zhu Wen (who since 882 bore the name Zhu Quanzhong) was actually called the Xuanwu governor instead of the "Bianliang governor"—Bianliang being a much later name of Xuanwu's capital Bianzhou.

The film got one detail right: according to historical records, Li Keyong had one eye smaller than the other.

== Reception ==
Empire Online gave The Heroic Ones four out of five stars, saying that although the film was "occasionally uneven in pace, [it] nonetheless delivers spectacular action and earns its rep as a must-have." Far East Films remarked that it was a "worthwhile addition to anyone's collection though, but is not among Cheh's finest works". The film has experienced some success since its original release in 1970 and has been screened at the 2004 Melbourne International Film Festival.
