= Li Kening =

Li Kening (Chinese: 李克寧) (died March 25, 908) was a younger brother of the late Chinese Tang dynasty warlord Li Keyong, the Prince of Jin. After Li Keyong's death, Li Kening initially served as a key advisor to Li Keyong's son and successor Li Cunxu (the future Emperor Zhuangzong of Later Tang), but soon was persuaded by his wife Lady Meng to try to take over from Li Cunxu. His plot was discovered, and Li Cunxu put him to death.

== Background ==
It is not known where or when Li Kening was born, but it is known that he was Li Keyong's youngest brother and therefore would have been born after 856, when Li Keyong was born. Their father was the ethnic Shatuo general Li Guochang, whose name was originally Zhuye Chixin but was later bestowed the Tang dynasty imperial clan name of Li and a new name of Guochang, but because Li Kening's birth year is unknown, it is not known whether he would have been born with the name of Li or Zhuye. He was said to be kind and filially pious, and (despite his eventual fate) described to be the most virtuous among Li Keyong's brothers and cousins.

== Service under Li Keyong ==
When Li Keyong rose in rebellion against Duan Wenchu (段文楚) the Tang defender of Datong Circuit (大同, headquartered in modern Datong, Shanxi) in 878, Li Kening served under him and carried the title of commander of Fengcheng Base (奉誠軍). When Li Keyong's enemy Helian Duo subsequently attacked the Shatuo base Huanghua (黃花, in modern Shuozhou, Shanxi), Li Kening helped defend the city and protect Li Keyong and the other brothers, and also participated in the later defense of Li Keyong's then-power base of Wei Prefecture (蔚州, in modern Zhangjiakou, Hebei). Presumably, when Li Keyong subsequently was defeated and forced to flee to the Dada (達靼) tribes, then in the Yin Mountains region, Li Kening followed him, for later, when Li Keyong returned from Dada to aid the Tang cause against the major agrarian rebel Huang Chao's state of Qi in 881, Li Kening was said to be part of that army; he followed Li Keyong in Li Keyong's subsequent campaigns against Huang.

After Li Keyong was made the military governor (Jiedushi) by then-reigning Emperor Xizong of Tang in 883 for his contributions against Huang, Li Kening was made the prefect of Liao Prefecture (遼州, in modern Jinzhong, Shanxi), and then the defender of Yun Prefecture (雲州, in modern Datong). Early in the Qianning era (894-898) of Emperor Xizong's brother and successor Emperor Zhaozong, Li Kening was made the prefect of Xin Prefecture (忻州, in modern Xinzhou, Shanxi). He served under Li Keyong when Li Keyong defeated the warlord Wang Xingyu (the military governor of Jingnan Circuit (靜難, headquartered in modern Xianyang, Shaanxi)) in 895, and for this achievement was given the honorary title of acting Situ (司徒, one of the Three Excellencies). There was an incident in 902 when Hedong's capital Taiyuan came under siege by Li Keyong's archrival Zhu Quanzhong the military governor of Xuanwu Circuit (宣武, headquartered in modern Kaifeng, Henan); at that time, Li Kening was set to return from Taiyuan to his post at Xin Prefecture, but hearing of Zhu's attack, returned to Taiyuan and showed determination in helping in the defense by stating, "This city is where I will die. Where else can I go from here?" Li Kening's remarks helped the morale of the soldiers, and the city's defenses held.

Early in the Tianyou era (904 and on — used by Emperor Zhaozong, Emperor Zhaozong's son and successor Emperor Ai, as well as post-Tang regimes that refused to recognize the subsequent Later Liang, founded by Zhu), Li Kening was made the commander of all Han and non-Han soldiers within Li Keyong's realm, acting Taibao (太保), and the military governor of Zhenwu Circuit (振武, headquartered in modern Shuozhou, Shanxi), and he made the decisions that did not needed to be submitted to Li Keyong.

In 908, Li Keyong — who was then the prince of his own state of Jin after Zhu usurped the Tang throne in 907 and established Later Liang, which he refused to recognize — became deathly ill. He entrusted his son and heir Li Cunxu to Li Kening, the eunuch monitor of the army Zhang Chengye, the generals Li Cunzhang and Wu Gong (吳珙), and the secretary Lu Zhi (盧質), before dying, on February 23.

== After Li Keyong's death ==
After Li Keyong's death, Li Kening initially took over the discipline of the army, and no one dared to create a disturbance. By contrast, the officers and the soldiers did not then respect the young (then 22) Li Cunxu, and they were constantly commenting about him. Li Cunxu, in fear, offered the command of the army to Li Kening, but Li Kening declined, pointing out that he was Li Keyong's lawful heir. Under Li Kening's and Zhang Chengye's insistence, Li Cunxu took the titles of Prince of Jin and military governor of Hedong.

Many of Li Keyong's adoptive sons who served as officers, however, were older and more accomplished militarily than Li Cunxu, and they did not respect him; many refused to meet him to pay homage, and some refused to bow to him. One of those, Li Cunhao (李存顥), tried to persuade Li Kening to take over the command himself, but Li Kening refused Li Cunhao's overture, going as far as to threaten him with execution. However, Li Cunhao and several other adoptive sons sent their wives to persuade Li Kening's wife Lady Meng. (Lady Meng was a sister to the Jin officer Meng Zhixiang, who would later become the founding emperor of Later Shu.) Lady Meng agreed with their idea, and therefore urged Li Kening to go with the idea, causing Li Kening's resolve to support Li Cunxu to be shaken. Further, he was also encountering policy disagreements with Zhang and Li Cunzhang and argued with them frequently. He thereafter killed an officer, Li Cunzhi (李存質), without Li Cunxu's approval, and also requested to be made the military governor of Datong Circuit. Li Cunxu agreed.

Despite Li Cunxu's agreement with Li Kening, the conspiracy around Li Kening continued. Li Cunhao specifically planned, with Li Kening's understanding, to seize Li Cunxu when Li Cunxu would visit Li Kening's mansion, deliver Li Cunxu and his mother Lady Dowager Cao to the Later Liang emperor, and take over Hedong Circuit. Li Kening met the officer Shi Jingrong (史敬鎔) to try to get Shi to join the plot and to surveil Li Cunxu. Shi pretended to agree, and then informed the plot to Li Cunxu. Li Cunxu met with Lady Dowager Cao and Zhang and initially offered to resign to try to avoid a conflict, but Zhang persuaded him to act against Li Kening. Zhang summoned Li Cunzhang, Wu Gong, as well as the officers Li Cunjing (李存敬) and Zhu Shouyin to prepare against Li Kening.

On March 25, 908, Li Cunxu held a feast at his own mansion, and all the high-level officers attended. At the feast, soldiers that Li Cunxu had previously hidden seized Li Kening and Li Cunhao. Li Cunxu, weeping, stated to Li Kening:

I, your child, was ready to yield the headquarters to you, Uncle, and you declined. Now, the command has settled, but so why are you plotting against me, preparing to deliver me and my mother to our enemy?

Li Kening responded, ambiguously:

This is all due to rabble-rousing by other people. What can I say?

That day, Li Cunxu executed Li Kening and Li Cunhao.

== Notes and references ==
- History of the Five Dynasties, vol. 50.
- New History of the Five Dynasties, vol. 14.
- Zizhi Tongjian, vols. 263, 266.
