= Consort Dowager Liu =

- Born: 853
- Died: 30 May 925 (aged 72)
- Spouse: Li Keyong

Consort Dowager Liu (劉太妃, personal name unknown) (died May 30, 925?) was the wife of Li Keyong, the founder of the Five Dynasties and Ten Kingdoms period state Jin. However, despite this status, after Li Keyong's son Li Cunxu later defeated Jin's rival Later Liang and established Later Tang as its Emperor Zhuangzong, she was not honored as empress dowager, but only given the lesser title of consort dowager.

== During Li Keyong's life ==
It is not known when Lady Liu was born, and all that is known about her background is that she was from the Daibei (代北, i.e., the region around and north of modern Xinzhou, Shanxi) region. It is not known when she married Li Keyong other than that it was before he initially rebelled against the reign of Emperor Xizong in 878. Throughout the campaigns that Li Keyong subsequently waged through the years, both as a rebel against and later as a Tang dynasty vassal, Lady Liu often accompanied him on campaigns. She was said to be intelligent, dextrous, and capable of strategies; she also often taught Li Keyong's concubines horsemanship and archery.

In 884, when Li Keyong, then a Tang vassal as the military governor (jiedushi) of Hedong Circuit (河東, headquartered in modern Taiyuan, Shanxi), was on a campaign south of the Yellow River against Huang Chao, Lady Liu accompanied him. One night when Li Keyong was attending a feast that Zhu Quanzhong the military governor of Xuanwu Circuit (宣武, headquartered in modern Kaifeng, Henan) held in his honor at Xuanwu's capital Bian Prefecture (汴州) inside the city, Lady Liu remained outside the city at the Hedong army camp. At the feast, Li Keyong, who became drunk, insulted Zhu in his stupor, and Zhu reacted by having the mansion that Li Keyong was staying at surrounded and attacked. Li Keyong had to fight his way out of the encirclement and out of the city, but his guard commander Shi Jingsi was killed during the attack. While the battle was going on, one of Li Keyong's attendants fled back to the Hedong camp and reported the ambush to Lady Liu. Lady Liu, fearing that the news would leak, executed the attendant while calmly planning a plan to withdraw. Li Keyong was able to fight his way out of the city and arrive back in the Hedong camp in the morning, and he then prepared an attack on Zhu. Lady Liu, pointing out that he would have no way of showing the imperial government that he was the victim of Zhu's treachery if he attacked Zhu, counseled against the attack, and Li Keyong agreed, withdrawing from the area. (This assassination attempt would set in motion the rivalry that Li Keyong and Zhu had for the rest of their lives.)

In 894, when Li Keyong was sieging his adoptive son Li Cunxiao, who had rebelled against him, at Xing Prefecture (邢州, in modern Xingtai, Hebei), when Li Cunxiao offered to surrender, it was Lady Liu that Li Keyong sent into the city to make sure that Li Cunxiao was, in fact, surrendering, and it was she who brought Li Cunxiao out to surrender. In 895, when Li Keyong defeated Wang Xingyu the military governor of Jingnan Circuit (靜難, headquartered in modern Xianyang, Shaanxi), who had threatened Emperor Xizong's brother and successor Emperor Zhaozong, and temporarily restored Jingnan to imperial control, Li Keyong was created the Prince of Jin, and Lady Liu was created the Lady of Qin.

By 902, however, much of Li Keyong's direct possessions and allied territories had been seized by Zhu. Zhu then took the opportunity to have Li Keyong's headquarters at Taiyuan put under siege, and the city nearly fell. Li Keyong considered a suggestion from his adoptive son Li Cunxin to abandon Taiyuan and flee to Yun Prefecture (雲州, in modern Datong, Shanxi). Lady Liu pointed out that if he abandoned Taiyuan, he might not be able to return later, and urged him to defend Taiyuan. With Lady Liu's advice (and those of his adoptive nephew Li Sizhao, adoptive son Li Siyuan, and officer Zhou Dewei), Li Keyong decided against abandoning Taiyuan. Eventually, the Xuanwu troops were forced to withdraw after suffering from illnesses, although for several years after Li Keyong did not dare to confront Zhu again.

Lady Liu was sonless, so Li Keyong's oldest son Li Cunxu, by his concubine Lady Cao, became the apparent heir. Lady Cao thus gained much favor from Li Keyong. Instead of being jealous of Lady Cao, Lady Liu treated her well, drawing greater respect from Li Keyong. Li Keyong thus also had her raise the sons of other concubines, and she treated them like they were her own. It was said that Lady Liu and Lady Cao thus developed a friendly relationship.

== During Li Cunxu's reign ==
In 907, Zhu Quanzhong forced Emperor Zhaozong's son and successor Emperor Ai to yield the throne to him, ending the Tang dynasty, with Zhu establishing a new Later Liang as its Emperor Taizu. Several months later, Li Keyong, who refused to recognize the new dynasty and still carried his Tang title as Prince of Jin, died, and was succeeded by Li Cunxu. Little is known about Lady Liu's activities during the subsequent 15-year war between Jin and Later Liang, as it was said that Li Cunxu often accepted counsel from his mother Lady Cao, but no reference was made to Lady Liu.

In 923, Li Cunxu, who had by that point taken all of the Later Liang territory north of the Yellow River, declared himself the emperor of Tang at Daming (大名, in modern Handan, Hebei) and thus establishing a new dynasty (commonly referred to as the Later Tang, even though Li Cunxu claimed to be the legitimate successor to Tang), as its Emperor Zhuangzong. He honored his mother Lady Cao as empress dowager and honored Lady Liu only with the lesser title of consort dowager, despite the fact that Lady Liu was Li Keyong's wife and Lady Cao was his concubine. When the news arrived at Taiyuan, where Lady Cao and Lady Liu were at, the new Consort Dowager Liu went to congratulate the new Empress Dowager Cao. Empress Dowager Cao was embarrassed that she was given a greater title than Consort Dowager Liu. Consort Dowager Liu stated to her:

May our son [(i.e., Emperor Zhuangzong)] have a long reign, such that after we both die and are buried, there will be people who can attend to our graves. Other than this, what can we wish for?

Later in the year, Emperor Zhuangzong captured the Later Liang capital Daliang (大梁, i.e., Bian Prefecture). Later Liang's last emperor Zhu Zhen committed suicide as the city fell, ending Later Liang. Later Tang took over all of Later Liang's territory, and Emperor Zhuangzong made the old Tang eastern capital Luoyang his capital. In spring 924, he sent his brother Li Cunwo (李存渥) and his son Li Jiji to Taiyuan to escort Empress Dowager Cao and Consort Dowager Liu to Luoyang. Consort Dowager Liu refused to leave Taiyuan, stating that she needed to remain to attend to the graves and the temples of the deceased emperors (i.e., Li Keyong and his father Li Guochang), and so Empress Dowager Cao headed to Luoyang by her own.

This was, according to traditional accounts, devastating to both Empress Dowager Cao and Consort Dowager Liu, however, as they missed each other bitterly, and both grew sad. Consort Dowager Liu fell ill in summer 925, and Empress Dowager Cao sent a stream of doctors to Taiyuan to treat her, but she did not get better. Empress Dowager Cao considered returning to Taiyuan to care for her, but Emperor Zhuangzong dissuaded her on account of the summer heat; instead, Li Cunwo was dispatched to Taiyuan to attend to Consort Dowager Liu. Soon thereafter, Consort Dowager Liu died. Mourning her, Empress Dowager Cao fell ill as well, and would die a few months later. Consort Dowager Liu did not receive a posthumous name and was buried at Wei County (魏縣, i.e., Daming).

== Notes and references ==
- Old History of the Five Dynasties, vol. 49.
- New History of the Five Dynasties, vol. 14.
- Zizhi Tongjian, vols. 255, 259, 263, 272, 273.

Chinese nobility
Preceded by None	Consort to Prince of Jin; 896–908	Succeeded by Consort Han
Preceded by Empress He of the Tang dynasty	Consort to Sovereign of China (Shanxi); 907–908	Succeeded by Consort Han
