= Zhu Shouyin =

Zhu Shouyin (朱守殷) (died November 7, 927), nickname Hui'er (會兒), was a Chinese military general and politician of the Five Dynasties and Ten Kingdoms Period state Later Tang (and Later Tang's predecessor state Jin). He was a close associate of Later Tang's first emperor Li Cunxu, having served as Li Cunxu's attendant ever since both were children. After Li Cunxu's death in a mutiny, Zhu served the succeeding emperor, Li Cunxu's adoptive brother Li Siyuan, but later, fearing that Li Siyuan was ready to act against him, rebelled. His rebellion was quickly defeated, and he killed his family and then had his attendants kill him.

== Background and service during Jin ==
It is not known when Zhu Shouyin was born, and his background was not stated in detail in the historical records, although it is known that he was a child servant/attendant to Li Cunxu while both were children (specifically, when Li Cunxu began his studies), suggesting that he was close to Li Cunxu in age. After the death of Li Cunxu's father Li Keyong the Prince of Jin in 908, Li Cunxu became prince, and he made Zhu the commander of the Chengzhi Army (成直軍), but it was said that Zhu did not actually participate in campaigns but was (at that point) only carrying the military title. (However, later that year, when Li Cunxu's uncle Li Kening unsuccessfully plotted against Li Cunxu, Zhu was one of the officers that Li Cunxu, his mother Lady Dowager Cao, and the leading eunuch Zhang Chengye summoned to plan for a counterplot, and subsequently, Li Cunxu and the other main co-conspirator, Li Cunhao (李存顥), were arrested and executed.) It was said that throughout the years, Zhu informed on other officials/officers to Li Cunxu, garnering his trust.

== During Li Cunxu's reign as emperor ==
In 923, Li Cunxu, whose Jin state was then locked into a long-term military campaign against its archrival Later Liang with the Yellow River as their border, declared himself the emperor of a new Later Tang. However, at that time, the Later Tang state was facing a number of economic and logistical problems, as well as threats from its northern neighbor Khitan Empire, such that its people were beginning to lose faith over whether it could actually prevail over Later Liang. Li Cunxu decided to try to change the status quo by having the major general Li Siyuan (his adoptive brother) launch a surprise attack on Later Liang's Tianping Circuit (天平, headquartered in modern Tai'an, Shandong), south of the Yellow River, and Li Siyuan was quickly able to capture it. This shocked the Later Liang emperor Zhu Zhen, who removed the supreme commander of his army against Later Tang, Dai Siyuan, and replaced Dai with Wang Yanzhang. Meanwhile, in light of the victory, Li Cunxu, anticipating a Later Liang counterattack to try to cut off communications between Later Tang proper and Tianping's capital Yun Prefecture (鄆州), positioned armies at various Later Tang-controlled forts on the Yellow River. At that time, Zhu Shouyin was serving in the position of surveyor of the Han and non-Han cavalry and infantry and Li Cunxu had him take up position at the key strategic city of Desheng (德勝, in modern Puyang, Henan), particularly warning him to guard against Wang's possible attack. Zhu, however, was not vigilant, and when Wang then attacked Desheng's southern city (i.e., the part of the city south of the Yellow River), Zhu was caught off guard, allowing Wang to capture the southern city quickly. Li Cunxu was forced to order Zhu to abandon the northern city as well to reinforce another key strategic fort on the river, Yangliu (楊劉, in modern Liaocheng, Shandong), and Li Cunxu then subsequently went to aid the city against Wang's attack. After a fierce battle between the two armies, Later Tang was able to hold Yangliu, allowing the supply lines to Yun to remain open. In light of Zhu's inattentiveness, Li Siyuan submitted a secret petition to Li Cunxu, urging him to punish Zhu, but Li Cunxu did not act on it, as he considered Zhu a close associate.

After Li Cunxu, later in the year, captured the Later Liang capital Daliang in a surprise attack, causing Zhu Zhen to commit suicide and ending Later Liang, he made Zhu Shouyin the military governor of Zhenwu Circuit (振武, headquartered in modern Shuozhou, Shanxi) in 924, but did not have Zhu Shouyin go to Zhenwu to take up command; rather, he kept Zhu Shouyin at the new capital Luoyang to continue to oversee the soldiers both Han and non-Han. He was put in charge of the capital guards. It was said that because of his close association with the emperor, he looked down on generals with greater achievement and was in alliance with Li Cunxu's favorite performer, Jing Jin (景進). He also pretended to think and speak slowly, to try to take on the form of someone who is tolerant and quiet.

By 926, Li Cunxu and his wife Empress Liu had come to suspect his chief of staff Guo Chongtao and Guo's ally, the major general Li Jilin, although Li Cunxu was initially not willing to act against Guo. Empress Liu, however, acted on her own and ordered their son Li Jiji the Prince of Wei to kill Guo. (Both Li Jiji and Guo were then at Chengdu, as Li Jiji was in titular command of a Later Tang army that had just destroyed Later Tang's southwestern neighbor Former Shu, with Guo in actual command of the operations.) After Guo's death, Li Cunxu went ahead and had Zhu Shouyin surround Li Jilin's mansion and kill him. Further, also suspecting Li Siyuan, LI Cunxu ordered Zhu to put Li Siyuan under surveillance, but Zhu secretly informed Li Siyuan about the surveillance and urged him to try to leave the capital to avoid consequences.

In light of the deaths of Guo and Li Jilin, many mutinies rose against Li Cunxu throughout the empire. Li Siyuan became involved in one that originally started at Yedu (鄴都, in modern Handan, Hebei) after he was sent to suppress it but was instead forced by his soldiers into joining it. Eventually, a mutiny rose at Luoyang as well. When the palace came under attack, Li Cunxu summoned Zhu to try to defend against the attack, but Zhu ignored his orders, and Li Cunxu was subsequently killed in the attack. Upon hearing of Li Cunxu's death, Zhu then entered the palace and took a number of palace women and treasures with him, and then sent a messenger to Li Siyuan (who by that point had advanced to Daliang), urging him to quickly come to Luoyang to settle the situation. Li Siyuan agreed, and after he arrived at Luoyang, he first claimed the title of regent, ordering Zhu to keep order in the city and wait for Li Jiji to arrive. However, Li Siyuan eventually decided not to simply yield the throne to Li Jiji and claimed it himself. (Li Jiji, who by that point was facing mutinies in his own ranks, committed suicide before he could arrive to contend with Li Siyuan.)

== During Li Siyuan's reign ==
Soon after Li Siyuan became emperor, he made Zhu Shouyin the mayor of Henan Municipality (河南, i.e., the Luoyang region) as well as the acting overall commander of the palace guards; he also gave Zhu the honorary chancellor designation of Shizhong (侍中). He later made Zhu the military governor of Xuanwu Circuit (宣武, headquartered in modern Kaifeng, Henan).

In fall 927, Li Siyuan, apparently without explaining a reason, departed the capital Luoyang and headed toward Xuanwu's capital Bian Prefecture (汴州), leading to all kinds of rumors — the chief among which were that he was intending to attack Later Tang's southeastern neighbor Wu, or that he was intending to act against one the rebellious military governors to the east. Zhu became fearful that Li Siyuan was targeting him. His secretary Sun Sheng suggested that he resist, and so he closed the city and prepared for siege. Li Siyuan, at the urging of his general Fan Yanguang, had Fan take 500 men to head toward Bian Prefecture to make an initial raid to unsettle the city, and then sent his son-in-law Shi Jingtang with a larger force to follow up. Fan's attack surprised the people at Bian Prefecture, as intended, and once Shi, and then Li Siyuan himself, arrived at Bian, the people surrendered in droves. Zhu knew that he was near defeat and killed his family before ordering his followers to cut off his head.

== Notes and references ==
- History of the Five Dynasties, vol. 74.
- New History of the Five Dynasties, vol. 51.
- Zizhi Tongjian, vols. 266, 272, 274, 275, 276.
