= Empress Dowager Cao (Li Cunxu's mother) =

Later Tang Dynasty figure (died 925)

Empress dowager of Later Tang Dynasty
- Tenure: 923–925
- Born: 854
- Died: 3 August 925 (aged 70–71)
- Spouse: Li Keyong
- Issue: Emperor Zhuangzong of Later Tang; Li Cunba, Prince of Yong; Li Cunwo, Prince of Shen; Li Cunji, Prince of Ya; Grand Princess Qionghua
Posthumous name
- Empress Zhenjian 貞簡皇后

Empress Dowager Cao (曹太后, personal name unknown) (died 3 August 925), formally, Empress Zhenjian (貞簡皇后, "virtuous and humble"), was a concubine to the late Tang dynasty warlord Li Keyong. She was the mother of his son, Li Cunxu, who went on to establish the Later Tang dynasty as its Emperor Zhuangzong. After the establishment of Later Tang, she was honored as empress dowager.

== Background ==
It is not known when Lady Cao was born, but it is known that she was from Taiyuan, then the capital of the Tang dynasty Hedong Circuit (河東), and that she was of commoner, but of respectable birth. It is not known when she became Li Keyong's concubine, but it was said that she was beautiful, humble, and intelligent, and thus, was respected by Li Keyong's wife Lady Liu. The lady was without a son and encouraged Li Keyong to treat Lady Cao well. She gave birth to Li Keyong's oldest son, Li Cunxu, in 885.

It was said that Li Keyong had many concubines and that he particularly favored Lady Zhang, who had previously been the wife of the warlord Li Kuangchou, whom he defeated in 894. Li Keyong no longer favored other women, but Lady Cao remained an exception. He was harsh and impatient in his character, and whenever his attendants had faults, they often would be punished. Lady Cao often interceded on their behalf, and it was with her intercession that many were spared.

At some point, Lady Cao received the title of Lady of Jin from the Tang imperial government.

== During Li Cunxu's reign as Prince of Jin ==
At a time by which time Tang's last emperor Emperor Ai had been forced to yield the throne to Li Keyong's archrival, Zhu Quanzhong, who established a new Later Liang as its Emperor Taizu, but whose legitimacy Li Keyong refused to recognise. In 908 Li Keyong died. Li Cunxu succeeded him as the Prince of Jin. Under Li Keyong's will, Li Keyong's brother Li Kening, the eunuch monitor Zhang Chengye, Li Keyong's adoptive son Li Cunzhang, the officer Wu Gong (吳珙), and the secretary general Lu Zhi (盧質) were to assist Li Cunxu in his rule. Li Cunxu initially offered the Prince of Jin position to Li Kening, but Li Kening pointed out that it was Li Keyong's will that he inherit the title, so Li Cunxu accepted that. Lady Cao thereafter was known as the Lady Dowager of Jin.

Li Kening soon ran into conflicts with Zhang and Li Cunzhang, however. He thus requested that he be allowed to leave the Jin capital Taiyuan and be made the military governor of Datong Circuit (大同, headquartered in modern Datong, Shanxi), which would be carved out of Hedong Circuit. Li Cunxu agreed. However, during the meantime, Li Keyong's adoptive son Li Cunhao (李存顥), as well as other adoptive sons of Li Keyong who did not want to submit to the new prince, were lobbying Li Kening and Li Kening's wife Lady Meng that Li Kening take over the Jin throne. Li Kening finally agreed, and he and Li Cunhao plotted to kill Zhang and Li Cunzhang during a feast at his house, and then submit to Later Liang and deliver Li Cunxu and Lady Dowager Cao to the Later Liang capital Daliang (大梁, in modern Kaifeng, Henan).

They tried to engage the officer Shi Jingrong (史敬鎔) in the plot, but Shi revealed the plot to Lady Dowager Cao. Lady Dowager Cao, initially not sure who the plotters were and apparently believing that Zhang might be part of the plot, summoned Zhang and confronted him. Zhang denied any knowledge, and Li Cunxu thereafter summoned Li Cunzhang, Wu, Li Keyong's adoptive son Li Cunjing (李存敬), and the officer Zhu Shouyin to plan a counterplot. Thereafter, at a feast, they seized and killed Li Kening and Li Cunhao, ending their plot.

Li Cunxu subsequently waged a 15-year campaign against Later Liang's Emperor Taizu and his son and successor Zhu Zhen, gradually seizing all of Later Liang's territory north of the Yellow River. It was said that he was filially pious to his mother, such that despite his constant campaigns, he often returned to Taiyuan to see her. On an occasion in 917 when Li Cunxu got into a violent argument with Zhang, who was in charge of the principality's treasury and urged against wasteful spending, Li Cunxu threatened to kill Zhang. When Lady Dowager Cao heard this, she immediately summoned Li Cunxu to her palace and rebuked him. She also sent a messenger to Zhang, stating: "My young son has offended the Tejin [(特進, the Tang title that Zhang carried)]. I have already whipped him for this offense." The next day, she took Li Cunxu to see Zhang to apologize to him. When Zhang died in 922, she went to his mansion to mourn him and she put on mourning clothes fit for a daughter or a niece.

== During Later Tang ==
In 923, Li Cunxu, who had by that time taken all of the Later Liang territory north of the Yellow River, declared himself the emperor of Tang at Daming (大名, in modern Handan, Hebei) and thus establishing a new dynasty (commonly referred to as the Later Tang, even though Li Cunxu claimed to be the legitimate successor to Tang), as its Emperor Zhuangzong. He honored his mother Lady Cao as empress dowager and honored Lady Liu only with the lesser title of consort dowager, despite the fact that Lady Liu was Li Keyong's wife and Lady Cao was his concubine. When the news arrived at Taiyuan, where Lady Cao and Lady Liu were, the new Consort Dowager Liu went to congratulate the new Empress Dowager Cao. Empress Dowager Cao was embarrassed that she was given a greater title than Consort Dowager Liu. Consort Dowager Liu stated to her:

May our son [(i.e., Emperor Zhuangzong)] have a long reign, such that after we both die and are buried, there will be people who can attend to our graves. Other than this, what can we wish for?

Later in the year, Emperor Zhuangzong captured the Later Liang capital Daliang (大梁, i.e., Bian Prefecture). Zhu Zhen committed suicide as the city fell, ending Later Liang. Later Tang took over all of Later Liang's territory, and Emperor Zhuangzong made the old Tang eastern capital, Luoyang, his capital. In spring 924, he sent his brother Li Cunwo (李存渥) and his son Li Jiji to Taiyuan to escort Empress Dowager Cao and Consort Dowager Liu to Luoyang. Consort Dowager Liu refused to leave Taiyuan, stating that she needed to remain to attend to the graves and the temples of the deceased emperors (i.e., Li Keyong and his father Li Guochang). So, only Empress Dowager Cao was escorted to Luoyang.

Meanwhile, Emperor Zhuangzong had wanted to create his favorite concubine, Lady Liu (not related to Consort Dowager Liu), empress, over his wife Lady Han, but had hesitated because Empress Dowager Cao had disliked Lady Liu. Lady Liu's candidacy also was opposed by Emperor Zhuangzong's army chief of staff Guo Chongtao. By spring 924, however, Guo, who had feared that many of Emperor Zhuangzong's favorite eunuchs and performers (as Emperor Zhuangzong had a serious interest in acting) were submitting false accusations against him, decided to make Lady Liu an ally, and therefore endorsed her candidacy to be empress. Emperor Zhuangzong agreed, and created Lady Liu empress. It was said that after Empress Liu's creation, the orders that Empress Dowager Cao and Empress Liu issued were considered to carry the same legal weight as Emperor Zhuangzong's edicts, and the circuits followed them equally.

According to traditional accounts, the separation between Empress Dowager Cao and Consort Dowager Liu was devastating to both of them, as they missed each other bitterly and both grew sad. Consort Dowager Liu fell ill in summer 925. Empress Dowager Cao sent a stream of doctors to Taiyuan to treat her, but she did not get better. Empress Dowager Cao considered returning to Taiyuan to care for her, but Emperor Zhuangzong dissuaded her on account of the summer heat. Instead, Li Cunwo was dispatched to Taiyuan to attend to Consort Dowager Liu. Soon thereafter, Consort Dowager Liu died. Mourning her, Empress Dowager Cao fell ill as well, and died a few months later.

== Notes and references ==
- Old History of the Five Dynasties, vol. 49.
- New History of the Five Dynasties, vol. 14.
- Zizhi Tongjian, vols. 263, 266, 269, 270, 271, 272, 273.
