= Helian Duo =

Tang Chinese warlord

- Traditional Chinese: 赫連鐸
- Simplified Chinese: 赫连铎
Transcriptions
Standard Mandarin
- Hanyu Pinyin: Hèlián Duó
- Wade–Giles: Ho-lien To

Helian Duo (died 894) was a chieftain of Tuyuhun and a warlord of the Tang dynasty. Often assisting or serving the Tang dynasty, he had a long-running enmity with the similarly sinicized Shatuo warlord Li Keyong, who killed him in 894.

== Life ==
=== Early years ===
Little is known about Helian Duo's background, including his birth year. He is first noted as a Tuyuhun chief during the reign of Emperor Yizong (r. 859–873), by which time he had received the title of commandant of the Yin Mountains from the Tang. He assisted the empire in its campaign against Pang Xun's rebellion in 868–869. The New History of the Five Dynasties claimed that he was made military governor (jiedushi) of Datong in modern Shanxi for his work against Pang but, as that is inconsistent with the other accounts of his advancement, it was probably a mistaken remark.

=== Conflicts with Li Keyong ===
In 878, the Shatuo officer Li Keyong rebelled against Emperor Yizong's son and successor Emperor Xizong at Datong in modern Shanxi and was soon joined by his father Li Guochang, a chieftain overseeing Zhenwu (振武) around modern Hohhot in Inner Mongolia. Emperor Xizong ordered Helian and his fellow Tuyuhun chieftain Bai Yicheng (白義誠) to help end the uprising alongside Mi Haiwan (米海萬), a Sage (薩葛) chieftain; Li Jun (李均), military governor of Zhaoyi (昭義) around modern Changzhi, Shanxi; and Li Keju, military governor of Lulong (盧龍) around modern Beijing.

In the summer of 879, Li Keyong positioned his main force to defend against Li Keju, leaving his officer Gao Wenji (高文集) in command of Shuozhou (朔州) in modern Shanxi. Helian persuaded Gao to submit to the lawful newly commissioned military governor for Datong, Li Zhuo (李琢). Gao imprisoned his fellow officer Fu Wenda (傅文達) and surrendered the city, along with Mi, Shi Jingcun, and the Shatuo chieftain Li Youjin (李友金). Li Keyong attempted to return and retake Shuozhou but was defeated by Li Keju. Li Zhuo and Helian then defeated the father Li Guochang in Wei Prefecture (蔚州) in modern Zhangjiakou, Hebei. The father and son fled to the Dada (達靼) tribe, then near the Yin Mountains.

For his work against the rebellion, Helian was made prefect of Yun (雲州) and the defender of Datong. Helian soon sent bribes to the Dada chiefs, asking them to kill the two Lis. Finding out about this, Li Keyong was able to impress the Dada chiefs with his skill at archery at a banquet and further proclaimed that he had no intent to stay in Dada lands long, alleviating their fears about him.

Helian, Li Keju, and Qibi Zhang (契苾璋), the new military governor of Zhenwu, attempted to block Li Keyong from recapturing Wei Prefecture in 882 but were unable to defeat him. Li Keyong subsequently redeemed himself to the Tang by greatly assisting in suppressing the agrarian rebel Huang Chao and was formally confirmed as the military governor of Hedong (河東) around modern Taiyuan, Shanxi. He reinforced his new position through an alliance with Wang Chucun, the military governor of Yiwu around modern Baoding, Hebei.

In 885, Helian agreed to attack Li Keyong to keep his forces occupied while Li Keju and Wang Rong, the military governor of Chengde (成德) around modern Shijiazhuang, Hebei, assaulted Yiwu, planning to divide it between themselves. Helian launched his attack but was unable to prevent Li Keyong from breaking through to aid Wang Chucun in fighting off the invasion. Li Keju then committed suicide after his defeated officer Li Quanzhong successfully mutinied and assaulted his capital Youzhou rather than returning to face severe punishment. Li Quanzhong was then confirmed to replace him as the military governor of Lulong.

In 890, Li Keyong launched a major attack against Helian and initially captured the eastern part of Yun Prefecture. Helian sought aid from Li Quanzhong's son and successor Li Kuangwei, who came to his aid. Li Keyong's officer An Jinjun (安金俊) was killed by an arrow and another officer Shen Xin (申信) surrendered to Helian, forcing Li Keyong to withdraw.

Helian and Li Kuangwei then submitted petitions to Emperor Xizong's brother and successor Emperor Zhaozong asking him to declare a new general campaign against Li Keyong. The idea was supported by Zhu Quanzhong, the military governor of Xuanwu (宣武) around modern Kaifeng, Henan, himself another rival of Li Keyong's, as well as by the chancellors Zhang Jun and Kong Wei. The emperor approved the petition, placing Zhang in command over a campaign to remove Li Keyong. Helian and Li Kuangwei were ordered to attack Li Keyong from the north. They were successful at first, with Li Kuangwei capturing Wei Prefecture and Helian killing the defender Liu Huzi (劉胡子) in an attack on Zhelu (遮虜軍) around modern Xinzhou, Shanxi, in which he was joined by Tibetan and Xiajiasi tribesmen. However, they were forced to withdraw after being defeated by a major force under Li Keyong's adopted sons Li Cunxin and Li Siyuan. Meanwhile, Zhang's main force was defeated by Li Keyong as well. His position having collapsed, Emperor Zhaozong then accepted the restoration of all of Li Keyong's titles.

Li Keyong then attacked Yun Prefecture again in 891, putting its capital Yunzhou under siege. Without adequate supplies, Helian abandoned the city and fled first to his fellow Tuyuhun tribesmen and then to Youzhou.

Helian and Li Kuangwei launched an attack to try to recapture Yun Prefecture in the fall of 892. Li Keyong was at Tianning (天寧) in modern Xinzhou and immediately ordered his officer Li Junqing (李君慶) to repulse the invasion with an army from his headquarters at Taiyuan. Li Keyong himself made a surprise attack against Helian and Li Kuangwei, capturing around 300 Tuyuhun scouts. After joining with Li Junqing's force, Li Keyong entered Yun Prefecture and again attacked and defeated Helian and Li Kuangwei, forcing their retreat.

In the summer of 893, Li Keyong launched an attack on the Tuyuhun tribes, killing Helian, capturing Bai Yicheng, and ending the tribes' resistance against him.
