= Li Cunxiao =

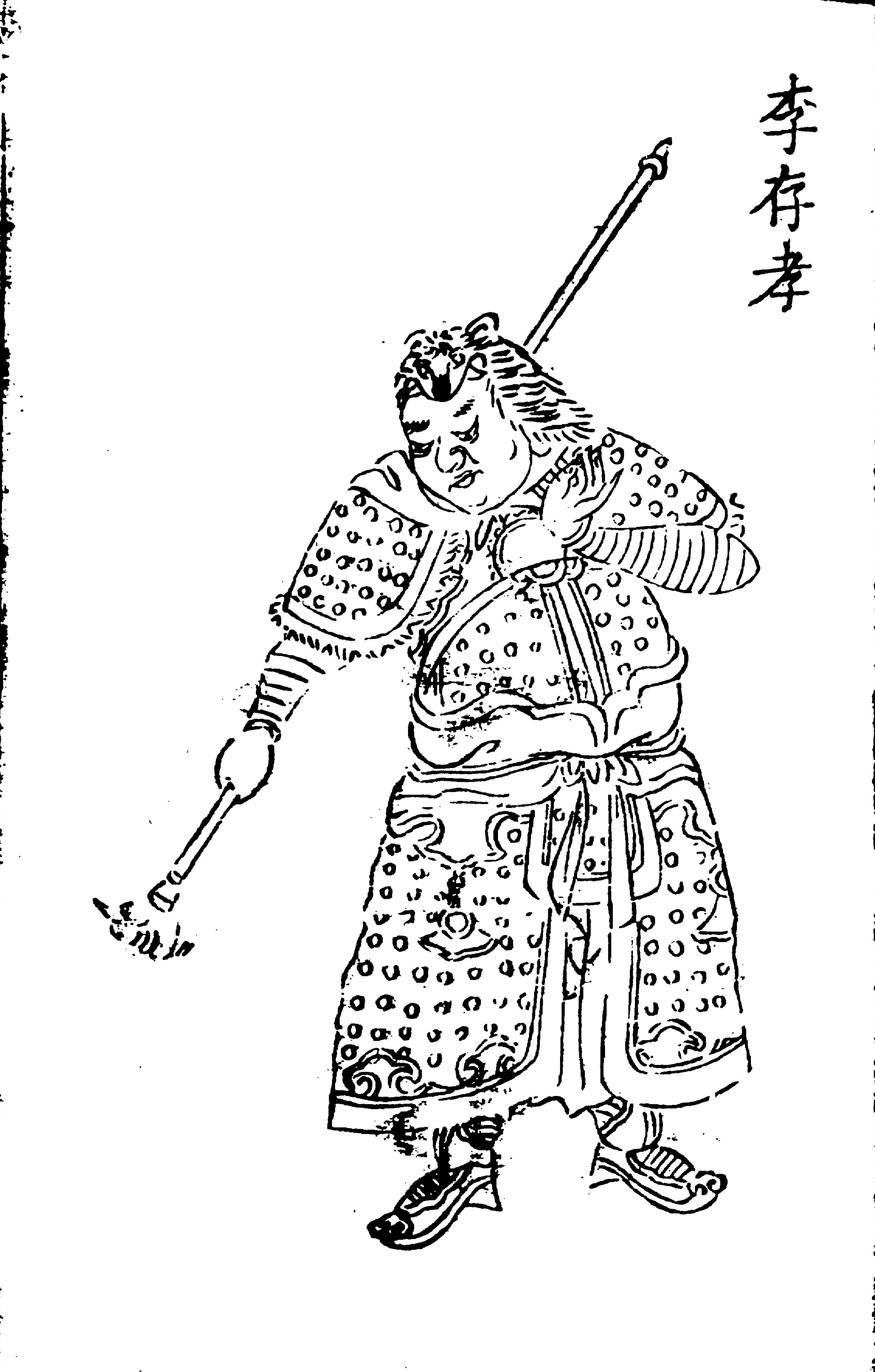
Li Cunxiao

Li Cunxiao (李存孝) (d. 894), né An Jingsi (安敬思), was an adoptive son of the late-Tang dynasty warlord Li Keyong who contributed much to Li Keyong's campaigns, but who later rebelled against his adoptive father. He subsequently was defeated by Li Keyong and executed by dismemberment after he surrendered, although Li Keyong soon regretted his death.

== Background ==
It is not known when An Jingsi was born, but it is known that he, or his family, was originally from Feihu (飛狐, in modern Zhangjiakou, Hebei). He was taken captive by Li Keyong during one of Li Keyong's raids in the region, and Li Keyong raised him as an adoptive son, changing his name to Li Cunxiao. He thereafter became a cavalry officer in Li Keyong's army. It was said that after he grew up, he was capable in horsemanship and archery, and no officer in Li Keyong's army rivaled him in ferocity. He often served as Li Keyong's forward commander, and during Li Keyong's campaigns against the agrarian rebel Huang Chao, he served with distinction.

== Campaigns under Li Keyong ==
In 888, when Zhang Quanyi the mayor of Henan Municipality (河南, i.e., the Luoyang region) turned against his ally Li Hanzhi the military governor of Heyang Circuit (河陽, headquartered in modern Jiaozuo, Henan) and captured Heyang Circuit's capital Heyang, Li Hanzhi sought aid from Li Keyong. Li Keyong had Kang Junli command Li Cunxiao and four other officers (Xue Atan (薛阿檀), Shi Yan (史儼), An Quanjun (安全俊), and An Xiuxiu (安休休)) in aiding Li Hanzhi to put Heyang under siege. However, Li Keyong's major rival Zhu Quanzhong the military governor of Xuanwu Circuit (宣武, headquartered in modern Kaifeng, Henan) sent his officers Ding Hui, Ge Congzhou, and Niu Cunjie (牛存節) to aid Zhang. The Xuanwu forces defeated the Hedong forces, causing An Xiuxiu to desert the army in fear of being punished. When the Xuanwu forces then threatened to cut off the Hedong forces' path back to Hedong, Kang withdrew, leaving Zhang in control of Heyang Circuit.

In 889, Li Keyong sent Li Hanzhi (who by that point was serving under Li Keyong) and Li Cunxiao to attack Meng Fangli, who then controlled the eastern half of Zhaoyi Circuit (昭義) with his headquarters at Xing Prefecture (邢州, in modern Xingtai, Hebei). (Li Keyong's brother Li Kexiu (李克脩) controlled the western half, with its headquarters at Lu Prefecture (潞州, in modern Changzhi, Shanxi).) Li Hanzhi and Li Cunxiao quickly captured the other two prefectures under Meng's control — Ci (磁州) and Ming (洺州, both in modern Handan, Hebei), and then put Xing under siege. Meng committed suicide. His brother Meng Qian (孟遷) subsequently surrendered Xing to Li Keyong, allowing Li Keyong to control Zhaoyi in its entirety.

In 890, then-reigning Emperor Zhaozong declared a general campaign against Li Keyong, with the chancellor Zhang Jun in command. With Li Kexiu having died recently, another brother of Li Keyong's, Li Kegong (李克恭), was in command at Zhaoyi, but was soon assassinated. His officer Feng Ba (馮霸) took over Lu Prefecture and soon received aid in defending the city from Zhu's officer Ge Congzhou. Li Keyong sent Kang and Li Cunxiao to put Lu under siege. Meanwhile, the imperially-commissioned new military governor, Zhang's deputy Sun Kui (孫揆), was also heading to Lu to take command. Li Cunxiao, receiving this news, laid a trap for Sun near Lu and captured Sun, whom he delivered to Li Keyong and whom Li Keyong executed. Feng and Ge subsequently abandoned Lu, allowing Li Keyong to regain control of Zhaoyi. Li Keyong made Kang the acting military governor of Zhaoyi and Li Cunxiao the prefect of Fen Prefecture (汾州, in modern Linfen, Shanxi). (Li Cunxiao was displeased with this, as he believed that due to his accomplishment in capturing Sun, he should be given Zhaoyi. It was said that for several days he did not eat well and killed a number of people, and thereafter began to harbor thoughts of turning against Li Keyong.)

In winter 890, Li Keyong sent Li Cunxiao to engage Zhang Jun. Zhang's ally Han Jian tried to ambush Li Cunxiao at night, but Li Cunxiao repelled his attack. After this failure, some of Zhang's army deserted him. Zhang and Han were forced to retreat to Jin Prefecture (晉州, in modern Linfen) to defend it. Li Cunxiao initially put it under siege, but then, concluding that it was not a good idea to capture a chancellor and slaughter the imperial army, opened up one side of the siege to allow Zhang and Han to escape. Li Cunxiao thereafter captured Jin and Jiang (絳州, in modern Yuncheng, Shanxi) Prefectures. With the imperial army defeated, Emperor Zhaozong was forced to abandon the campaign and seek peace with Li Keyong.

In 891, An Zhijian (安知建), whom Li Keyong had commissioned as the military governor of Xingming Circuit (邢洺, i.e., formerly the eastern half of Zhaoyi), was secretly communicating with Zhu. When Li Keyong realized this, he commissioned Li Cunxiao to replace An. An, in fear, fled, and was killed in flight by Li Keyong's ally Zhu Xuan the military governor of Tianping Circuit (天平, headquartered in modern Tai'an, Shandong).

Later in 891, Li Cunxiao tried to persuade Li Keyong to launch a campaign to capture Chengde Circuit (成德, headquartered in modern Shijiazhuang, Hebei), then ruled by Wang Rong. Li Keyong initially agreed. However, Li Cunxiao's adoptive brother Li Cunxin, a rival for Li Keyong's favor, then dissuaded Li Keyong from the plan. Thereafter, when Wang and his ally Li Kuangwei the military governor of Lulong Circuit (盧龍, headquartered in modern Beijing) attacked Yaoshan (堯山, in modern Xingtai) in spring 892, Li Keyong sent Li Cunxiao and Li Cunxin to try to lift the siege, but as Li Cunxiao and Li Cunxin despised each other, neither was willing to attack first, forcing Li Keyong to further send Li Sixun (李嗣勳) to repel Wang's and Li Kuangwei's attack. After this event, Li Cunxin falsely accused Li Cunxiao of being in communications with Wang and Zhu. When Li Cunxiao heard this, in anger, he in fact entered into an alliance with Wang and Zhu, and further submitted a petition to Emperor Zhaozong, offering his domain to imperial control and further requesting to attack Li Keyong. Emperor Zhaozong commissioned Li Cunxiao as the military governor of Xingming Circuit, but forbade him from attacking Li Keyong.

== Rebellion against Li Keyong ==
In 893, when Li Keyong attacked Wang Rong, Li Cunxiao personally led his troops to aid Wang; however, Li Keyong's attack was not repelled until Li Kuangwei also came to Wang's aid and defeated Li Keyong, forcing him to withdraw.

As of fall 893, Li Keyong's army had Li Cunxiao's capital Xing Prefecture under siege. Li Keyong had his soldiers dig ditches around Xing's walls, but Li Cunxiao disrupted the operation by frequently attacking the soldiers digging the ditches. The Hedong officer Yuan Fengtao (袁奉韜) then sent a secret message to Li Cunxiao, stating that Li Keyong would return to Hedong's capital Taiyuan as soon as the ditches were complete and that Li Cunxiao should let the ditches be finished, as none of the other Hedong officers could stand up to him. Li Cunxiao, agreeing with Yuan, held off on attacking the ditch-digging soldiers. Soon thereafter, the ditches were complete, but to Li Cunxiao's surprise, the ditches were done so well that no one could cross them, and they trapped Li Cunxiao inside the city without aid.

By spring 894, the food supply in Xing Prefecture had been exhausted. Li Cunxiao ascended the city walls and begged Li Keyong for mercy. Li Keyong sent his wife Lady Liu inside the city to check on Li Cunxiao, and she came out with him. Li Cunxiao again begged for mercy, stating that it was due to Li Cunxin's false accusations that he turned against Li Keyong. Li Keyong rebuked him for allying with Wang Rong and Zhu Quanzhong, and then took him back to Taiyuan and executed him by dismemberment. (Li Keyong had originally intended to release Li Cunxiao, and believed incorrectly that as Li Cunxiao was to be executed, other officers would beg on his behalf, and then he could release Li Cunxiao without losing face; instead, none of the other officers, who were all jealous of Li Cunxiao's ferocity, spoke on his behalf, so the execution was carried out.) Li Keyong was said to be so saddened by Li Cunxiao's death that he did not oversee matters of the military for a number of days. Soon thereafter, Xue Atan, who had been in secret communications with Li Cunxiao since the other officers were also jealous of him, committed suicide. It was said that Li Cunxiao's and Xue's deaths so weakened Li Keyong's army that he was not able to contend with Zhu thereafter.

== In fiction ==
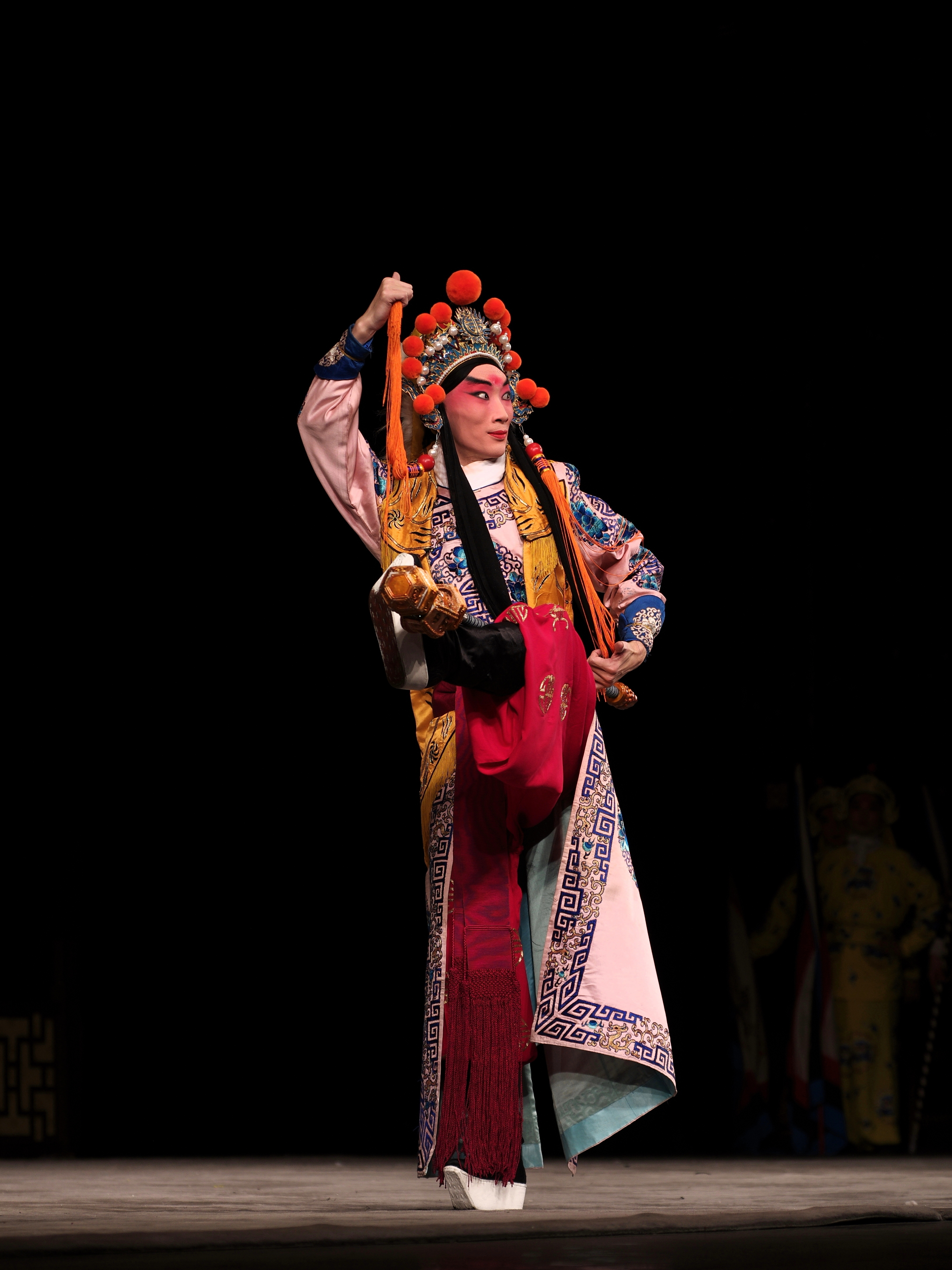
A Peking opera actor portraying Li Cunxiao during a performance by Shanghai Jingju Theatre Company on December 21, 2014, in Tianchan Theatre, Shanghai, China.

The Yuan dynasty master playwright Guan Hanqing wrote a play titled "A Grieving Lady Deng Painfully Laments Cunxiao" (鄧夫人苦痛哭存孝), which was translated as "Death of the Winged-Tiger General" by Yang Hsien-yi and Gladys Yang in 1958. (Lady Deng was the name of Li Cunxiao's wife in the play.) According to the play, Li Cunxiao was extremely loyal to Li Keyong and never intended to rebel, but was falsely accused of that by the treacherous Li Cunxin and Kang Junli, who had him cruelly executed behind Li Keyong's back. Influential Ming dynasty novelist Luo Guanzhong's classic novel Romance of the End of Tang and Five Dynasties Histories (殘唐五代史演義) expanded on this account and exaggerated Li Cunxiao's heroic prowess. Several modern dramas were in turn based on these largely fictional stories and deviated even more from history, including:

- The Heroic Ones, a 1970 Hong Kong film starring David Chiang as Li Cunxiao
- General Stone, a 1976 Hong Kong film starring Tan Tao-liang as Li Cunxiao
- The Wild Bunch, a 1982 Hong Kong TV series starring Felix Wong as Li Cunxiao

== Notes and references ==
- History of the Five Dynasties, vol. 53.
- New History of the Five Dynasties, vol. 36.
- Zizhi Tongjian, vols. 255, 257, 258, 259.
