= Kang Junli =

Tang Chinese military general

Kang Junli (Chinese: 康君立; 847–894) was a military general in imperial China's Tang dynasty, serving the Shatuo leader Li Keyong.

He was eventually killed by Li Keyong for speaking ill of the already deceased Li Cunxiao, with whom he did not get along.

== Biography ==
Kang Junli was from a powerful family in Yuzhou (蔚州; in modern Yu County, Hebei) near Tang dynasty's northern border. Some time in the 870s, he was serving as an assistant captain (牙校) under Duan Wenchu (段文楚), the Yunzhou (雲州; modern Datong, Shanxi) defense commissioner (防禦使). At that time the Tang dynasty was overran by bandits, and Duan did not treat his soldiers well, even reducing their salaries. In 878, Kang, as well as Xue Zhiqin (薛志勤), Cheng Huaixin (程懷信), Wang Xingshen (王行審) and Li Cunzhang plotted with Li Jinzhong (李盡忠), Yunzhou's Shatuo armed commander (兵馬使), to join Li Keyong. Kang was sent to Yuzhou to persuade Li Keyong to mutiny. When Li Keyong expressed he needed to report this to his father Li Guochang in Zhenwu Circuit (振武, headquartered in modern Hohhot, Inner Mongolia), Kang uttered: "Now that the secret is out, delays may bring trouble. How could (we) afford the time to report this to (someone) thousands of li away?" Li Keyong then agreed to act, resulting in the overthrow and execution of Duan.

In 888, Kang was named the "southern bandit suppression commissioner" (南面招討使) and given 20,000 soldiers to assist Li Keyong's ally Li Hanzhi recover his former territory Heyang (河陽; headquartered in modern Luoyang, Henan). Li Cunxiao, Xue Atan (薛阿檀), Shi Yan (史儼), An Quanjun (安全俊) and An Xiuxiu (安休休) were under his command. They were defeated by Zhu Quanzhong's forces and withdrew after An Xiuxiu fled.

In 890, the imperial court declared war on Li Keyong. Li Keyong's brother Li Kegong (李克恭) was killed by a subordinate in Zhaoyi Circuit (昭義, headquartered in modern Changzhi, Shanxi), who then surrendered to Zhu. Li Keyong then sent Kang and Li Cunxiao to surround the Zhaoyi capital of Luzhou (潞州). Kang was on good terms with Li Cunxin, whose relationship with adoptive brother Li Cunxiao was sour at best. After the defeat of the imperial court and the recapture of Luzhou, Kang was named the military governor of Zhaoyi Circuit, but Li Cunxiao believed he deserved the post more and went into a jealous rage.

In 893, Li Cunxiao rebelled in Xingzhou (邢州; in modern Xingtai, Hebei), prompting Li Keyong to send Kang in a counterattack. Kang performed well in the campaign and was promoted to inspecting grand-guardian (檢校太保). In spring 894, Li Cunxiao was captured and begged for mercy, claiming that he rebelled only because of Li Cunxin's false accusations. Li Keyong valued Li Cunxiao and wanted to spare his life. Even as he sentenced Li Cunxiao to death, he believed that other generals would beg on Li Cunxiao's behalf, but nobody did. After Li Cunxiao's death, Li Keyong became very depressed. Later that year, during a banquet in Jinyang (晉陽; modern Taiyuan, Shanxi), Li Keyong happened to mention Li Cunxiao during a conversation and cried uncontrollably. Kang responded by insulting Li Cunxiao's character. Furious, Li Keyong drew his sword and seriously injured Kang, also ordering his imprisonment. Kang was already dead when Li Keyong decided to release him.

== In fiction ==
In the Yuan dynasty play "A Grieving Lady Deng Painfully Laments Cunxiao" (鄧夫人苦痛哭存孝) by Guan Hanqing, which was translated as "Death of the Winged-Tiger General" by Yang Hsien-yi and Gladys Yang in 1958, Kang Junli was along with Li Cunxin one of the antagonists who were blamed for Li Cunxiao's unjustified death. (Lady Deng was the name of Li Cunxiao's wife in the play.) In this fictional play, Kang and Li Cunxin had Li Cunxiao cruelly executed behind Li Keyong's back out of jealousy. Influential Ming dynasty novelist Luo Guanzhong's classic novel Romance of the End of Tang and Five Dynasties Histories (殘唐五代史演義) was also based on this account.
