= Shi Jingsi =

Shi Jingcun (史敬存) (died 11 June 884), known as Shi Jingsi (史敬思) in Chinese historiography likely for naming taboo reasons, was a minor general in imperial China under the Shatuo military leader Li Keyong near the end of the Tang dynasty. He sacrificed his life to help his inebriated lord escape an assassination attempt by Zhu Wen (Zhu Quanzhong) in Zhu's territory.

== Biography ==
Shi Jingsi was from Yanmen (雁門; around modern Datong, Shanxi) and started his career as an assistant captain (牙校) there. Once the Shatuo leader Li Keyong took over Yanmen, Shi was named the protector-general (都督) of nine districts (府). He was further promoted to an assistant general (裨將) in the major city of Taiyuan (in modern Shanxi), the capital of Li Keyong's administrative territory.

In early 884, Li Keyong led his troops to attack the anti-government rebel force of Huang Chao, and Shi was the vanguard general to assist the besieged cities of Chenzhou (陳州; in modern Zhoukou, Henan) and Xuzhou (許州; in modern Xuchang, Henan). Huang then besieged Bianzhou (汴州; modern Kaifeng, Henan) as Bianzhou's Xuanwu (宣武; headquartered at Bianzhou) military governor Zhu Wen (Zhu Quanzhong) sought emergency aid from Li Keyong. Li soundly defeated Huang near Bianzhou, and Shi chased the enemy until Xuzhou (in modern Jiangsu) and Yanzhou (兗州; around modern Jinxiang County, Shandong). He would often fight at the forefront and was well known for his bravery.

On 11 June 884, Shi accompanied Li as the latter accepted an invitation from Zhu for a feast in Bianzhou to celebrate the victories. At the banquet, Li got very drunk and verbally offended Zhu, although Zhu, an ambitious man in a time of almost nonexistent imperial control, possibly already had unspeakable intentions all along. After Li retreated to the so-called Shangyuan Lodging (上源驛), Zhu dispatched hundreds of soldiers to kill him. The assassins placed felled trees, fences and wagons around the place to prevent anyone from escaping. With Li taking a long time to wake up, Shi, who also consumed much wine, climbed a tower and killed dozens of assassins using arrows. While other guards including Li Siyuan helped Li Keyong escape in the downpour of the night, Shi stayed behind and fended off Zhu's soldiers at a bridge until he was tragically butchered. Li Keyong climbed the city wall to escape to safety, mourned Shi deeply, and began (although not immediately) a warfare with Zhu that would span several decades. Shi Jingsi's son Shi Jiantang (史建瑭) would become a notable general under Li Keyong and Li's successor Li Cunxu.

== Modern reference ==
Shi Jingsi's heroics were reenacted in the 1970 Hong Kong martial arts film The Heroic Ones, where he was portrayed by Ti Lung. He was portrayed by Wai Tin-chi in the 1982 Hong Kong TV series The Wild Bunch.
