= Li Cunxin (Tang dynasty) =

Tang Chinese military general

Personal details
- Born: 862 or early 863 likely modern Inner Mongolia
- Died: late 902 or early 903 likely modern Taiyuan, Shanxi

Li Cunxin
- Chinese: 李存信
Transcriptions
Standard Mandarin
- Hanyu Pinyin: Lǐ Cúnxìn
- Wade–Giles: Li^{3} Ts'un^{2}-hsin^{4}
Yue: Cantonese
- Jyutping: Lei^{5} Cyun^{4}-seon^{3}

Former Chinese name
- Traditional Chinese: 張污落
- Simplified Chinese: 张污落
Transcriptions
Standard Mandarin
- Hanyu Pinyin: Zhāng Wūluò

Li Cunxin (李存信) (862–902), originally Zhang Wuluo (張污落), was a military general in imperial China's Tang dynasty, serving the Shatuo military leader Li Keyong, who adopted him as a son.

Li Cunxin had a sour relationship with Li Cunxiao, another of Li Keyong's many adopted sons, and indirectly caused Li Cunxiao's defection.

== Biography ==
Zhang Wuluo was most definitely not a Han Chinese — he could speak 4 "barbarian" languages and read 6. He may possibly be a Uyghur, as his father, carrying the Chinese name of Zhang Junzheng (張君政), had been a follower of Li Sizhong, a Uyghur who submitted to the Tang dynasty after the collapse of the Uyghur Khaganate in 840. The family moved southward in the late 840s or early 850s, settling in Heluochuan (合羅川; probably around the Juyan Lake Basin in modern Inner Mongolia).

Adept at mounted archery, he first served the elderly Shatuo commander Li Guochang, and in 882 followed Li Guochang's son Li Keyong on the southern campaign against the anti-government rebel leader Huang Chao. Through military merit, he rose to the position of chief director of armed forces (馬步軍都指揮使) and was adopted by Li Keyong with the new name of Li Cunxin.

In 890, Li Kuangwei from Lulong (盧龍, headquartered in modern Beijing) invaded and conquered Yuzhou (蔚州, in modern Yu County, Hebei) from Li Keyong, while the Xianbei chieftain Helian Duo from Yunzhou (雲州, in modern Datong, Shanxi) also attacked with joint Tibetan and Yenisei Kirghiz forces. Li Cunxin was tasked to resist the invasion without much success. Li Keyong then sent another adopted son Li Siyuan to assist Li Cunxin, and the Shatuo forces secured a victory. With Li Keyong's main force arriving, Li Kuangwei and Helian Duo's forces withdrew.

Li Cunxin was jealous of Li Cunxiao and tried hard to impede all of Li Cunxiao's actions. In 891, when Li Cunxiao asked for permission to attack the warlord Wang Rong, Li Keyong initially agreed, but changed his mind when Li Cunxin advised against it. In 892, Li Cunxin was sent with Li Cunxiao for a joint attack on Wang, but as they deeply distrusted each other, neither attacked. Li Cunxin then falsely accused Li Cunxiao of being in communications with Wang. This led to Li Cunxiao's defection and eventual death.

In 896, Li Cunxin was allocated 30,000 men to reinforce the warlord cousins Zhu Xuan and Zhu Jin against Li Keyong's archenemy Zhu Wen. Instead, Li Cunxin stayed behind in Weizhou (魏州) and sent Li Siyuan to the front line with only 300 cavalrymen. Li Cunxin's soldiers were not disciplined and pillaged Weizhou, resulting in Weizhou/Bozhou's military governor Luo Hongxin turning against the Shatuo army and defeating Li Cunxin. Later Li Cunxin attacked Luo again and defeated Zhu Wen's general Ge Congzhou.

In 897, Li Cunxin suffered a large defeat at the hands of Liu Rengong. Furious, Li Keyong almost executed him. Afterwards, Li Cunxin often used illness as an excuse to avoid battles. In 902, when Li Keyong's capital of Taiyuan was besieged by Zhu Wen's forces, Li Cunxin had proposed that they desert Taiyuan and flee to Yunzhou in the north, but Li Keyong decided against it. Li Cunxin died that year at the age of 40.

== In fiction ==
Due to the role he played in Li Cunxiao's death, Li Cunxin was particularly vilified in the Yuan dynasty play "A Grieving Lady Deng Painfully Laments Cunxiao" (鄧夫人苦痛哭存孝) by Guan Hanqing, which was translated as "Death of the Winged-Tiger General" by Yang Hsien-yi and Gladys Yang in 1958. (Lady Deng was the name of Li Cunxiao's wife in the play.) In this fictional play, Li Cunxiao's death was entirely brought about by Li Cunxin and Kang Junli, who had him cruelly executed behind Li Keyong's back. Influential Ming dynasty novelist Luo Guanzhong's classic novel Romance of the End of Tang and Five Dynasties Histories (殘唐五代史演義) was also based on this account.
