= Li Cunzhang =

Personal details
- Born: unknown likely modern Datong, Shanxi
- Died: April or May 922 modern Datong, Shanxi
- Children: Li Yanqiu (李彥球), son; 2 other sons
- Full name: Surname: Lǐ (李); Given name: Cúnzhāng (存璋); Courtesy name: Déhuáng (德璜)

Li Cunzhang
- Chinese: 李存璋
Transcriptions
Standard Mandarin
- Hanyu Pinyin: Lǐ Cúnzhāng
- Wade–Giles: Li^{3} Ts'un^{2}-chang^{1}

Li Cunzhang (李存璋) (died 922) was a military general in imperial China's Tang dynasty, and later the Jin territory in the ensuing Five Dynasties and Ten Kingdoms period after Tang's collapse. He served the Shatuo leaders Li Keyong — who adopted him as a son — and Li Keyong's biological son and successor Li Cunxu.

He originally joined Li Keyong along with Kang Junli and Xue Zhiqin (薛志勤). After many battles, first against the rebel Huang Chao and later against Zhu Wen, he was eventually named commissioner of the Army of Righteous Sons (義兒軍使). When Li Keyong fell seriously ill, Li Cunzhang supported eunuch Zhang Chengye and others in installing Li Keyong's son Li Cunxu as his successor. The new Prince of Jin named Li Cunzhang commissioner of armed forces (馬步軍使) in Hedong (河東; roughly modern Shanxi) in charge or reorganizing the unregulated troops. Li Cunzhang imposed strict law in all military matters and disciplined the troops. When Li Cunxu fought against Liu Xun in 915, the Later Liang sent an army to attack Jin's capital of Taiyuan, but Li Cunzhang defended the city well. He was promoted to defense commissioner (防禦使) and later the military governor of Datong Command (大同軍).
