= Xue =

- Xue in regular script
- Pronunciation: Xuē (Pinyin); Sih (Pe̍h-ōe-jī)
- Language: Chinese

Origin
- Language: Old Chinese

Other names
- Variant forms: Hsüeh (Wade-Giles, Taiwan); Sit (Cantonese); Sih，Siek (Hokkien, Teochew); Setsu (Japanese); Seol (Korean); Tiết (Vietnamese)

Xue ([ɕɥé]) is the pinyin romanization of the Chinese surname 薛 (Xuē). It is romanized as Hsüeh in Wade-Giles. In Hong Kong and Macau it is usually romanized through its Cantonese pronunciation Sit. In Korean, it corresponds to Seol (설), in Japanese to Setsu and in Vietnamese to Tuyết. in Indonesia and Netherlands, it is commonly spelled as Siek. According to the 2010 Chinese Census, it is the 76th most common surname in China, a sharp decline from 48th in 1982. In a study by geneticist Yuan Yida on the distribution of Chinese surnames, people who carry the name Xue are dispersed throughout the country and is most heavily concentrated in Shanxi. It is the 68th name on the Hundred Family Surnames poem.

== Origin ==
The surname traces back to the State of Xue in what is modern-day Shandong. Yu the Great (大禹), founding emperor of the Xia dynasty, bestowed upon his minister Xi Zhong the title Marquis of Xue in gratitude for his invention of the Chinese chariot; Xi Zhong's descendants subsequently bore Xue as their clan name.

Sinicized descendants of various non-Han Chinese peoples also adopted Xue as their surname, including the Turkic Tiele Xueyantuo tribe, the Xianbei Chigan clan, and several Manchu clans such as Sakda Hala, Sue Hala, Sunit Hala, etc.

== In literature ==
In the classical novel Dream of the Red Chamber by Cao Xueqin, the Xue family is one of the four noble families of Jinling. The socially graceful debutante Xue Baochai, a literary embodiment of ideal traditional Chinese femininity, is one of the principal characters in the novel.

== Notable people with this surname ==
=== Academics and science ===
- Xue Juzheng, Song Dynasty historian and scholar
- Xue Muqiao, Chinese economist

=== Arts, media and entertainment ===
- Xue Fei, former China Central Television news anchor
- Xue Ji, Tang dynasty calligrapher
- Nancy Sit Ka Yin, Hong Kong actress
- Xue Jiye, Chinese painter and sculptor
- Xue Jinghua, the prima ballerina of the ballet Red Detachment of Women
- Fiona Sit Hoi Kei, Hong Kong actress/singer
- Xue Tao, Tang dynasty poet
- Xue Xiaolu, Chinese director and screenwriter
- Xue Xinran, British-Chinese broadcaster, journalist and author
- Xue Yongjun, Chinese artist
- Xue Zhi Qian (Joker Xue), Chinese Singer and actor
- Francis Hsueh and Steven Hahn, film-making duo
- Amy Sit Ying Yi, Hong Kong actress

=== Athletics ===
- Xue Bing, Chinese canoe sprinter
- Xue Changrui, Chinese pole vaulter, Asian Champion 2013
- Xue Chen, Chinese professional beach volleyball player
- Xue Enhui, Chinese para-athlete
- Xue Haifeng, archer who competed in the 2004 and 2008 Summer Olympics
- Xue Juan, Chinese javelin thrower
- Xue Ming, Chinese volleyball player
- Xue Ya'nan, Chinese footballer
- Xue Yuyang, Chinese basketball player
- Xue Zhiwen, Chinese speed skater

=== Business ===
- Xue Manzi (Charles Xue), Chinese American entrepreneur, son of Xue Zizheng
- ShaoLan Hsueh, entrepreneur born in Taiwan who developed a new method to teach Chinese characters.
- Albino SyCip (Xue Minlao), co-founder of Filipino bank, Chinabank
- Alfonso SyCip (Xue Fenshi) Chairman, Philippine Chinese General Chamber of Commerce, 1934–41.

=== Criminals ===
- Sek Kim Wah (1964–1988), Singaporean convicted serial killer who was sentenced to death for five murders in Singapore
- Seet Cher Hng, Singaporean convicted murderer who killed his wife in 2018

=== Government, politics, law and military ===
- Hsueh Hsiang-chuan (1944-), politician in Taiwan
- Hsueh Jui-yuan, former Minister of Health and Welfare
- Shieu Fuh-sheng, former Minister of Environment
- Hsueh Ling (1954-), member of the Democratic Progressive Party, in Taiwan
- Seet Ai Mee, former Acting Minister of Community Development in Singapore
- Xue Daoheng, official in Northern Qi, Northern Zhou and Sui dynasty
- Xue E, Tang dynasty general, grandson of Xue Rengui
- Xue Feng, American geologist held in China on espionage charges
- Xue Fucheng, Qing dynasty diplomat
- Xue Hanqin, judge at International Court of Justice
- Xue Ji, Tang dynasty chancellor, great-grandson of Xue Daoheng
- Xue Ju, founding emperor of a short-lived state of Qin at the end of the Sui dynasty
- Xue Ping, Tang dynasty general, son of Xue Song
- Hsueh Chi, Taiwanese economist and politician
- Xue Ne, early Tang dynasty general, son of Xue Rengui,
- Xue Rengao, emperor of the short-lived state of Qin before surrendering to the founder of the Tang dynasty, Emperor Taizong of Tang
- Xue Rengui, early Tang dynasty general, most known for his campaigns against Goguryeo, the Western Turkic Khaganate, and the Tibetan Empire
- Xue Song, Tang dynasty general, grandson of Xue Rengui
- Xue Wanche, early Tang dynasty general
- Xue Wenjie, Min official
- Xue Xu, Eastern Wu official, son of Xue Zong
- Xue Yiju, Tang dynasty and Later Liang dynasty chancellor
- Xue Ying, Eastern Wu official, son of Xue Zong
- Xue Yuanchao, Tang dynasty chancellor
- Xue Yue, Kuomintang army general during the Second Sino-Japanese War and the Chinese Civil War
- Xue Zizheng, former Deputy Head of the United Front Work Department
- Xue Zong, Minister of State of Eastern Wu during the Three Kingdoms
- Alfred Sit Wing Hang, former Secretary for Innovation and Technology in Hong Kong
- Kingsley Sit Ho Yin, Member of the Legislative Council of Hong Kong.

=== Fiction ===
- Xue Baochai, one of the protagonists of the classic Chinese novel Dream of the Red Chamber

== See also ==
- Xue (given name)
