= 912 =

Calendar year

912 in various calendars
- Gregorian calendar: 912; CMXII
- Ab urbe condita: 1665
- Armenian calendar: 361; ԹՎ ՅԿԱ
- Assyrian calendar: 5662
- Balinese saka calendar: 833–834
- Bengali calendar: 318–319
- Berber calendar: 1862
- Buddhist calendar: 1456
- Burmese calendar: 274
- Byzantine calendar: 6420–6421
- Chinese calendar: 辛未年 (Metal Goat); 3609 or 3402 — to — 壬申年 (Water Monkey); 3610 or 3403
- Coptic calendar: 628–629
- Discordian calendar: 2078
- Ethiopian calendar: 904–905
- Hebrew calendar: 4672–4673
- Hindu calendars
- Vikram Samvat: 968–969
- Shaka Samvat: 833–834
- Kali Yuga: 4012–4013
- Holocene calendar: 10912
- Iranian calendar: 290–291
- Islamic calendar: 299–300
- Japanese calendar: Engi 12 (延喜１２年)
- Javanese calendar: 811–812
- Julian calendar: 912; CMXII
- Korean calendar: 3245
- Minguo calendar: 1000 before ROC 民前1000年
- Nanakshahi calendar: −556
- Seleucid era: 1223/1224 AG
- Thai solar calendar: 1454–1455
- Tibetan calendar: ལྕགས་མོ་ལུག་ལོ་ (female Iron-Sheep); 1038 or 657 or −115 — to — ཆུ་ཕོ་སྤྲེ་ལོ་ (male Water-Monkey); 1039 or 658 or −114

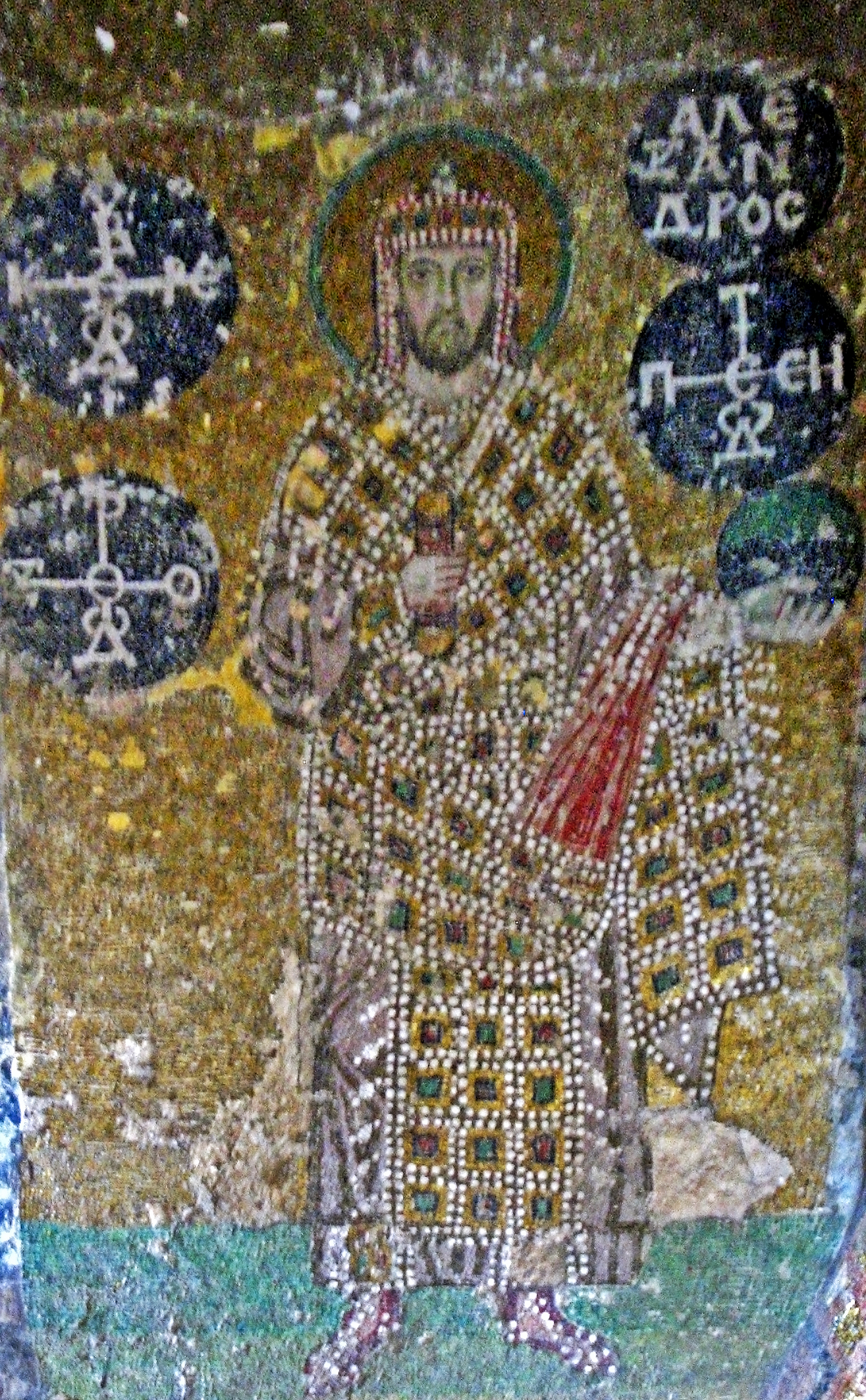
Emperor Alexander III (870–913)

Year 912 (CMXII) was a leap year starting on Wednesday of the Julian calendar.

== Events ==
=== By place ===
==== Byzantine Empire ====
- May 11 – Emperor Leo VI (the Wise) dies after a 26-year reign, in which he has completed the Byzantine code of laws (Basilika). He is succeeded by his brother Alexander III as emperor (basileus) alongside Leo's 6-year-old son Constantine VII. Alexander becomes de facto ruler of the Byzantine Empire and expels Empress Zoe Karbonopsina, the mother of Constantine, from the palace and exiles her to a nunnery.

==== Europe ====
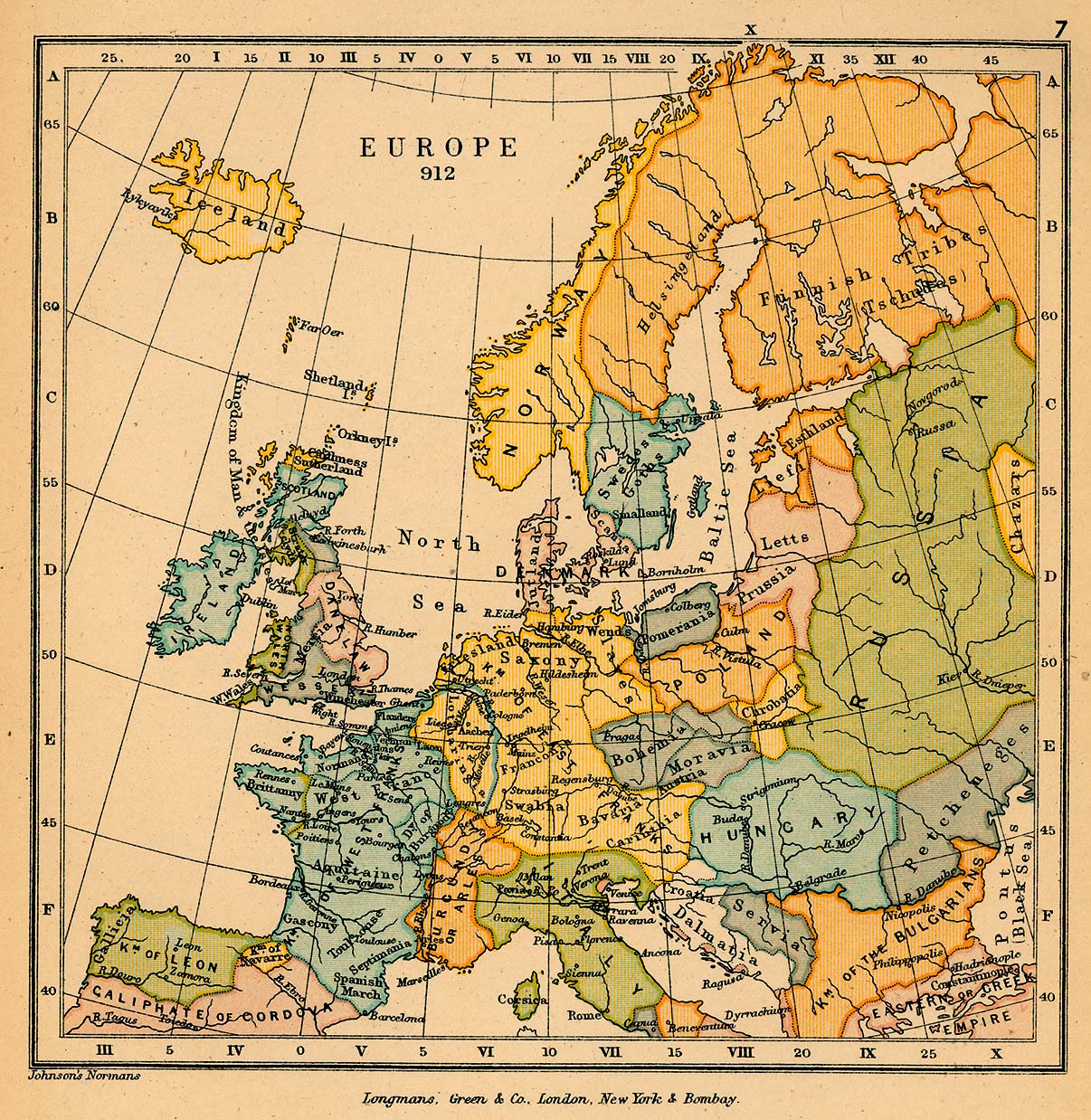
Europe in 912 AD, around the start of the saeculum obscurum

- German dukes Henry the Fowler of Saxony and Arnulf I (the Bad) of Bavaria claim themselves to be sovereign princes, not recognizing the authority of their overlord, King Conrad I of the East Frankish Kingdom, as he is not a Carolingian. Duke Erchanger II of Swabia and Conrad's brother, Duke Eberhard III of Franconia, support the Conradines.
- Orso II Participazio becomes the doge of Venice. He sends his son Pietro to Constantinople in order to re-establish the relationship with Alexander III.
- King Ordoño II of Galicia continues his expansion of the Christian polity. He sacks the cities of Mérida and Évora.

==== Britain ====
- Lady Æthelflæd expands her policy by building defensive burghs at Shrewsbury and Bridgnorth. The fortifications are needed to protect Mercia against plundering Vikings from the Danelaw (Danish territory in England).

==== Arabian Empire ====
- October 16 – Abd al-Rahman III succeeds his grandfather Abdullah ibn Muhammad (after his execution) and becomes emir of Córdoba (Al-Andalus).
- The second rebellion in two years, of the Kutama tribesmen against the Fatimid Caliphate, occurs.

==== China ====
- July 18 – Emperor Taizu (Zhu Wen) is murdered in the imperial palace at Kaifeng by his eldest living son Zhu Yougui after a 5-year reign. He succeeds his father as the ruler of Later Liang.

=== By topic ===
==== Religion ====
- Euthymius I is deposed as Patriarch of Constantinople, and Nicholas Mystikos is restored.

== Births ==
- November 23 – Otto I, emperor of the Holy Roman Empire (d. 973)
- Alberic II, princeps and duke of Spoleto (d. 954)
- Frederick I, duke of Upper Lorraine (approximate date)
- Hyejong, king of Goryeo (Korea) (d. 945)
- Ma Xichong, governor and ruler of Chu (d. 951)
- Minamoto no Mitsunaka, Japanese nobleman and samurai (d. 997)
- Nakatsukasa, Japanese waka poet (d. 991)
- Nikephoros II, emperor of the Byzantine Empire (d. 969)
- Pelagius of Córdoba, Christian martyr (d. 926)
- Ryōgen, Japanese monk and abbot (d. 985)
- Willa of Tuscany, queen consort of Italy (or 911)
- Xue Juzheng, Chinese scholar-official and historian (d. 981)

== Deaths ==
- May 11 – Leo VI, emperor of the Byzantine Empire (b. 866)
- May 25 – Xue Yiju, chancellor of Later Liang
- July 18 – Zhu Wen, emperor of Later Liang (b. 852)
- August 15 – Han Jian, Chinese warlord (b. 855)
- October 15 – Abdullah ibn Muhammad, Muslim emir (b. 844)
- October 25 – Rudolph I, king of Burgundy (b. 859)
- November 30 – Otto I, duke of Saxony
- Ahmad ibn Yusuf, Muslim mathematician (b. 835)
- Guanxiu, Chinese Buddhist monk and poet (b. 832)
- Hermenegildo Gutiérrez, Galician nobleman
- Hyogong, king of Silla (Korea) (b. 885)
- Ibn Khordadbeh, Persian geographer
- Notker the Stammerer, Benedictine monk
- Oleg of Novgorod, Varangian prince
- Pietro Tribuno, doge of Venice (approximate date)
- Qusta ibn Luqa, Syrian Melkite physician (b. 820)
- Rudalt, Breton nobleman (approximate date)
- Smbat I, king of Armenia (approximate date)
- Wilferth, bishop of Lichfield (approximate date)
- Zhang Ce, chancellor of Later Liang
- Zhu Youwen, prince of Later Liang
