= Yang Ningshi =

Chinese calligrapher

- 楊凝式

Personal details
- Born: 873 AD Huayin, China
- Died: 957 AD China
- Occupation: Poet, Calligrapher

Yang Ningshi (楊凝式) (873 AD – 957 AD) was a Chinese calligrapher who lived and worked in the 9th and 10th centuries. He has been described as the most famous calligrapher of the chaotic Five Dynasties period (906 – 960 AD).

== Life ==
His Chinese name was 楊凝式.

He belonged to the Yang clan of Hongnong. His father Yang She was a well known government official who served as a chancellor during the reigns of Tang's final emperor Emperor Ai.

He was born in 873 AD in Huayin, China during the late Tang dynasty (618 – 907).

He died in 957 AD in China.

== Career ==
=== Bureaucratic career ===
He qualified in the imperial examination (jinshi) in 905 AD, when he was around 32 or 33 years old.

He then went on to serve in his country's government as a financial inspector, secretary, and censor.

=== Calligraphy career ===
His talent as a skilled calligrapher of the Chinese language was noticed by powerful politicians, including Zhang Quanyi (852 AD – 926 AD) and the then prime minister Zhao Guangyin.

Zhao Guangyin appointed him to the position of Upright Scholar.

== Bibliography ==
Very little of his work survives today. Most of his surviving work varies in scripts used, because of which contemporary experts and historians are unable to gain a complete picture of his work.

His calligraphy style in the Chinese language has been described as being robust and uninhibited.

His Notable Works include:

- The Jiuhua tie 韭花帖, or "Scallion Flower Manuscript," or "Leek Flower Post" is a letter written on paper to an unknown recipient, traditionally believed to be the Chinese emperor

== See also ==
- Mi Fu
- Chinese calligraphy
