= Tianyou =

Tianyou (天祐) was a Chinese era name used by several emperors of China. It may refer to:

- Tianyou (904–907), era name used by Emperor Ai of Tang, later continued by various warlords after the fall of Tang in 907 (in particular, used until 919 in Wu (Ten Kingdoms))
- Tianyou (?–1094), era name used by Duan Zhengming, emperor of Dali
- Tianyou (1354–1357), era name used by Zhang Shicheng
