= Chineasy =

Internet startup

- Headquarters: London, UK
- Founder: ShaoLan Hsueh
- CEO: ShaoLan Hsueh
- Industry: Online education, Chinese Language, Graphic Design, Education
- Services: Second language acquisition (Chinese)
- Website: chineasy.com
- Advertising: No
- Registration: No
- Launched: 14 February 2013; 13 years ago
- Current status: Online and publications

Chineasy is a company that publishes Chinese language-learning material, using illustrations to help memorize Chinese characters. It was created by entrepreneur Shaolan Hsueh, with offices based in the UK and Taiwan. The 2014 book Chineasy: The New Way to Read Chinese contains about 400 characters. It was based on her 2013 TED talk and funded via a crowdfunding campaign through Kickstarter.

While the book introduces common Chinese characters, it does not teach pronunciation or grammar, and thus does not teach how to read or use the language, although it does use voice recordings for the users to mimic.

Chineasy's first app, Chineasy, launched in 2018, provides interactive flashcards and quizzes. Recognized as an Apple App Store Editor's Choice, the app reached #2 in the UK and #6 in the US in the education category. Chineasy was also featured during the keynote address at Apple’s 2019 Worldwide Developers Conference (WWDC) in San Jose. In 2022, the app was a finalist in the Apple Design Awards for its emphasis on Delight & Fun.

In 2024, Chineasy released the Talk Chineasy app.

== Set of characters ==
Chineasy teaches sometimes traditional and sometimes simplified forms. Hsueh argued that traditional and simplified forms of Chinese still share a great number of characters, and in real life – just as in the case of British English and American English – one will come across both forms. Where they differ, she shows the other version as well.

== Reception ==
Chineasy has been featured in the Financial Times, the Wall Street Journal, Time magazine, and National Public Radio. It won Wallpaper’s 2014 Design Award. Hsueh's book uses illustrations and storytelling. Characters are illustrated by various illustrators including Noma Bar.

According to sinologist and linguist Victor H. Mair, "anyone who deceives him/herself into thinking that using Chineasy is a magic bullet for learning Chinese will simply be wasting his/her time." He wrote:

"First of all, if you employ Ms. Hsueh’s methods, you won’t learn any real Chinese language. You won’t know the sound of a single Chinese word. You won’t even know the sound of a single Chinese character. You won’t learn anything about Chinese grammar or syntax. You won’t be able to speak or write a single Chinese sentence. If you doggedly persist, you might learn to recognize a hundred or so individual characters, but you wouldn’t know how to pronounce them or use them in any meaningful context.
What is worse, you will be subjected to a lot of assertions that are wrong."
