= Military-Political Academy =

Soviet military academy (1919–1991)

Lenin Military-Political Academy
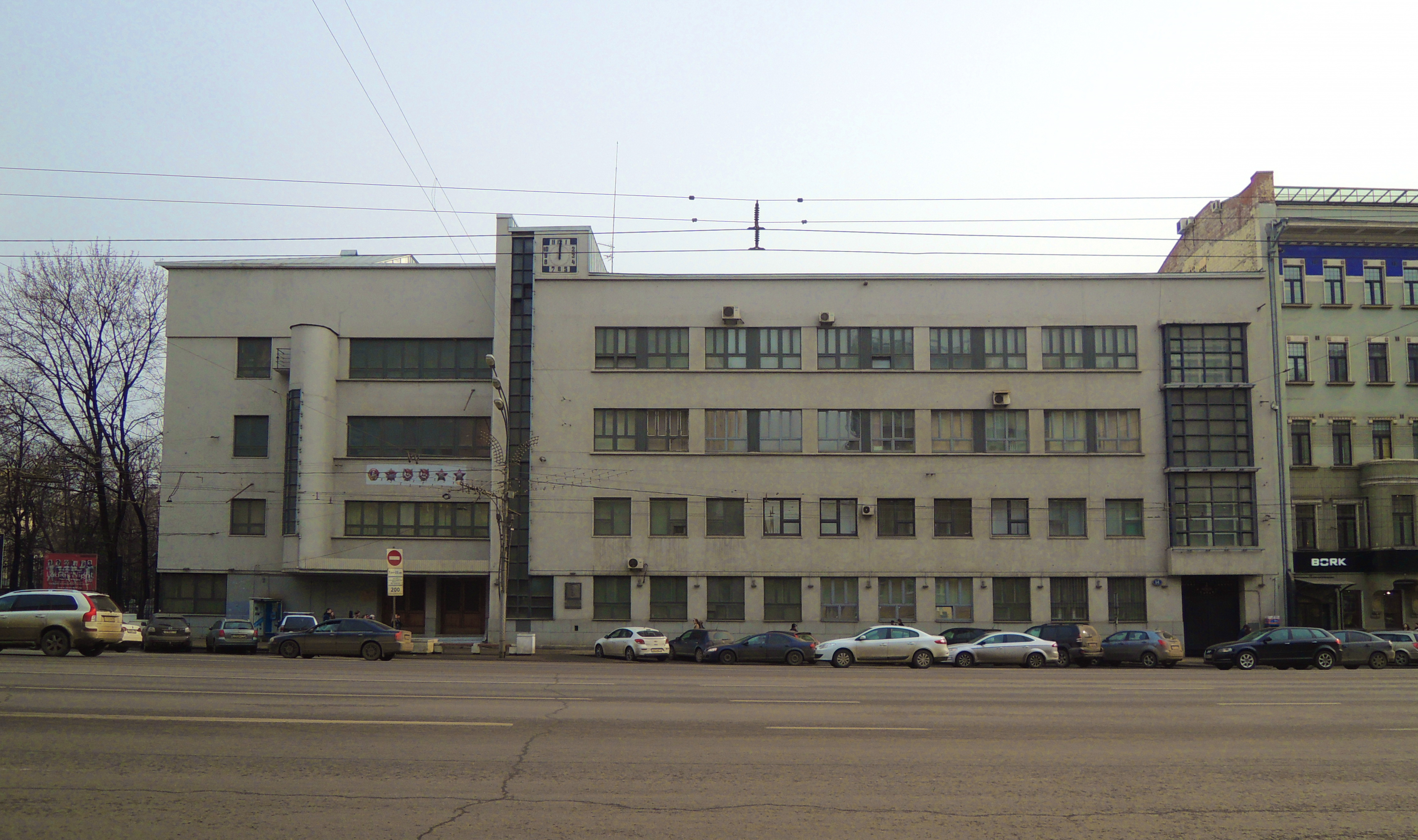
- The former official building on Bolshaya Sadovaya Street in Moscow
- Active: 1919–1991

The V. I. Lenin Military-Political Academy (Russian: Военно-политическая академия имени В. И. Ленина, romanized: Voyenno-politicheskaya akademiya imeni V. I. Lenina), abbreviated as VPA, was a higher military educational institution of the Soviet Armed Forces from 1919 to 1991 that provided advanced training to political officers.

== History ==
The predecessor of the academy was the Teachers' Institute of the Red Army, which was established on 5 November 1919 from the Courses for Agitators at the Smolny Institute in Petrograd. The institute was named after Nikolay Tolmachyov, a political worker who was killed at the front; the academy continued to carry the name of Tolmachev in subsequent renamings until 1938. The institute carried the mission of training teachers for Red Army schools and political workers for the army. It was renamed the Petrograd Red Army University on 14 April 1920 and was transferred to the Political Directorate (PUR), being renamed the Petrograd Instructors' Institute by orders of 10 and 12 March 1921.

The institute was combined with the 16th Army Red Army University (formed by the Western Front on 5 July 1920), which had absorbed the party schools of the 8th and 17th Rifle Divisions in August 1920, on 3 March 1922. The Higher Military-Political Course was created as a result of the merger. The course was soon renamed to the Military-Political Institute of the Red Army and Fleet on 14 February 1923 and made equivalent to a military academy. It became the N. G. Tolmachev Military-Political Academy on 14 May 1925 and was subordinated to the chief of higher educational institutions under the PUR. The VPA was tasked with providing higher education to political workers. Awarded the Order of Lenin on 31 October 1934, the academy was renamed in honor of Vladimir Lenin on 11 January 1938, assuming its longtime name: V. I. Lenin Military-Political Academy. The academy was also relocated to Moscow in 1938.

The academy was awarded the Order of the Red Banner on 13 December 1944 and the Order of the October Revolution in 1969. The academy was reorganized as the Humanitarian Academy on 7 December 1991 as a result of the elimination of political workers in the armed forces.

== Structure of the Academy ==
=== Faculties ===
- Combined Arms
- Naval
- Air Force
- Military pedagogical
- Military Law (operating from 1957–1974)
- Faculty of distance learning
- Faculty for the training of officers of the countries of popular democracy
- Higher academic courses

=== Departments ===
- Department of History of the CPSU
- Department of dialectical and historical materialism
- Department of political economics
- Department of Soviet History
- Department of pedagogy
- Department of the History of International Workers and National Liberation Movement
- Department of party work
- Department of political and military geography
- Department of Journalism
- Department of Theory and History of State and Law and State Law
- Department of Criminal Law
- Department of Judicial Law and Criminalistics
- Department of military administration and administrative law
- Department of Tactics
- Department of Artillery
- Department of the Air Force
- Department of the Navy
- Department of the history of wars and military art
- Department of Communications and Radar
- Department of atomic and chemical weapons
- Department of Engineering Troops
- Department of military topography
- Department of physical fitness

=== Support and service units ===
- Club Academy
- Guard Company
- Military Band
- Medical Service and Clinic
- Automotive Department
- Artillery Repair Shop
- Independent Combined Battalion (Military Unit 21212)

== Awards ==
- Order of Lenin (1934)
- Order of the Red Banner (1944)
- Order of the October Revolution (1969)

== Notable graduates ==
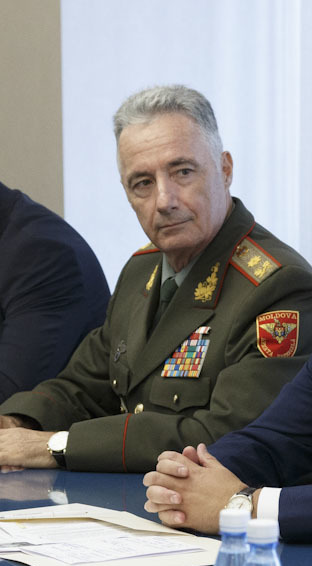
Victor Gaiciuc

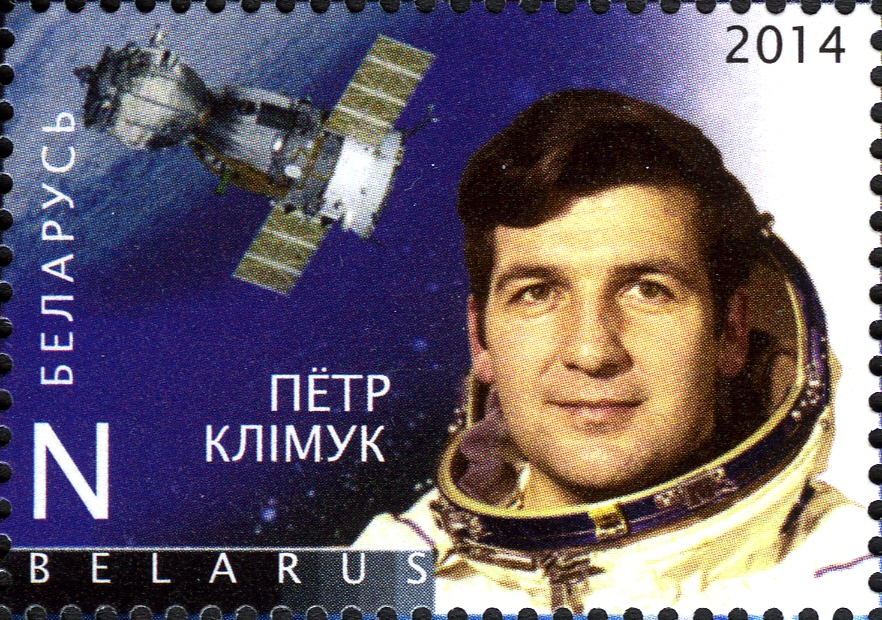
Pyotr Klimuk

- Pyotr Klimuk – A former Soviet cosmonaut and the first Belarusian to perform space travel.
- Nikolai Vedeneyev – Former head of faculty at the Military Academy of Mechanization and Motorization.
- Alexander Moiseyevsky – Major general and Hero of the Soviet Union.
- Semyon Rudniev – A leader of Soviet partisan movement during World War II.
- Alexey Sorokin – An Admiral of the Fleet and former member of the Congress of People's Deputies of the Soviet Union.
- Victor Gaiciuc – National Security Advisor to Moldovan President Igor Dodon. He was also the Secretary of the Supreme Security Council and was a two time Moldovan Minister of Defense.
- Igor Alekseyev – A People's Deputy of Ukraine
- Xue Zizheng – Former deputy head of the United Front Work Department of the Central Committee of the Chinese Communist Party.
- Levan Sharashenidze – A Soviet and Georgian general who formerly served as the Defense Minister of Georgia.
- João Lourenço – President of Angola

== See also ==
- Military University of the Ministry of Defense of the Russian Federation
- KUVNAS
- Counter-Japanese Military and Political University
- Kiev Naval Political College
- Riga Higher Military Political School
- Minsk Higher Military-Political School
- Tallinn Higher Military-Political Construction School
