= Igor Alekseyev (politician) =

Ukrainian politician

Ihor Alekseyev
- Ігор Алексєєв
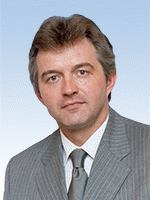

Member of the Verkhovna Rada
- In office March 31, 2002 – October 26, 2014

Personal details
- Born: January 10, 1960 (age 66) Donetsk, Ukrainian SSR, USSR
- Party: Communist Party of Ukraine (1993-); Communist Party of Ukraine (Soviet Union) (1987-1991); Communist Party of the Soviet Union (1983-1991)
- Education: Lenin Military-Political Academy; Diplomatic Academy of the Ministry of Internal Affairs
- Occupation: Military officer, diplomat, politician

Military service
- Allegiance: Ukraine; Soviet Union
- Branch/service: Ukrainian Ground Forces; Soviet Army
- Years of service: 1991-1996 (Ukrainian Army); 1981-1991 (Soviet Army)
- Battles/wars: Cold War

Ihor Viktorovych Alekseyev (Ukrainian: Ігор Вікторович Алексєєв; born 10 January 1960), is a Ukrainian politician and former army officer who served as a Member of the Verkhonva Rada from 2002 to 2014.

== Biography ==
Alekseyev was born in Donetsk.

=== Education ===
Alekseyev attended the Donetsk higher military-political school for engineer troops and signal corps. In 1991 he attended the Lenin Military-Political Academy. In 1998 he completed a Master's degree in Foreign Policy at the Diplomatic Academy affiliated with Ministry of Internal Affairs of Ukraine.

=== Career ===
Alekseyev served in the Soviet and Ukrainian military from 1981-1996. From 1981-1983 he was a Signal company executive officer in Kiev. From 1983-1985 he was Secretary of the Komsomol committee, agitator of political section at the Kiev Higher Military-Engineering School. From 1985-1988 he was the agitator of a military unit in Magadan. From 1988-1991 he was a student at the Lenin Military-Political Academy in Moscow. From 1991-1994 he taught at the Kyiv Army Institute. From 1994-1996 he served as 1st Secretary of the Munitions and Disarmament Control Office, Ministry of Foreign Affairs of Ukraine. From 1996-1998 he studied at the Diplomatic Academy, Ukraine. From 1998-2002 he was Consul of Diplomatic Mission of Ukraine to the Kingdom of Denmark

Igor Alekseyev joined the Communist Party of Ukraine in 1987.

=== Plenary ===
In 2002 Alekseyev began serving as an elected People's Deputy. He was in the 4th, 5th and 6th Verkhovna Rada (2002 - 2006]), as No. 50 in the party list. He was a member of the Communist Party fraction (May 2002). He was a member of the Committee on Foreign Affairs (June 2002) and chairman of the subcommittee on International Treaties. In the 5th Verkhovna Rada he was 14 in the party list, serving as Chairman of the Subcommittee of International and Legal Affairs of the Committee on Foreign Affairs (July 2006).

== See also ==
- List of Ukrainian Parliament Members 2007
- Verkhovna Rada
