= Yang She =

Chinese Tang chancellor

Yang She (楊涉), courtesy name Wenchuan (文川), was an official of the Chinese Tang dynasty and Tang's successor Later Liang, serving as a chancellor during the reigns of Tang's final emperor Emperor Ai and Later Liang's both commonly recognized emperors, Emperor Taizu (Zhu Quanzhong) and Emperor Taizu's son Zhu Zhen.

== During Tang dynasty ==
=== Background and early career ===
It is not known when Yang She was born. His family was originally from Tong Prefecture (同州, in modern Weinan, Shaanxi), and claimed ancestry from the Sui dynasty general Yang Su. His grandfather Yang Yizhi (楊遺直) served as a personnel officer at Hao Prefecture (濠州, in modern Chuzhou, Anhui). At one point, Yang Yizhi became a teaching scholar at Su Prefecture (蘇州, in modern Suzhou, Jiangsu), and therefore settled there, making it the childhood home of Yang She's father Yang Yan (楊嚴), who would eventually serve as the deputy minister of defense and the acting director of finances by the time of his death in 878. (Yang Yan's older brother (Yang She's uncle) Yang Shou had been earlier a chancellor during the reign of then-reigning Emperor Xizong, who was eventually removed and executed in exile for corruption; Yang Yan's career had been thus itself derailed by demotions due to taint by his relationship with Yang Shou but had been resumed by that point.) Yang She had at least two younger brothers, Yang Zhu (楊注) and Yang Dong (楊洞).

Yang She himself passed the imperial examinations in the Jinshi (進士) class in 875. During the subsequent reign of Emperor Xizong's brother and successor Emperor Zhaozong, he successively served as Libu Langzhong (吏部郎中), a supervisory official at the ministry of civil service affairs (吏部, Libu); the deputy minister of rites (禮部侍郎, Libu Shilang); and deputy minister of justice (刑部侍郎, Xingbu Shilang). In 897, he became the deputy minister of civil service affairs (吏部侍郎, Libu Shilang). In early 904, he became Shangshu Zuo Cheng (尚書左丞), one of the secretaries general of the executive bureau of government (尚書省, Shangshu Sheng). When Emperor Zhaozong was forced by the major warlord Zhu Quanzhong the military governor (Jiedushi) of Xuanwu Circuit (宣武, headquartered in modern Kaifeng, Henan) to move the capital from Chang'an to Luoyang later that year, Yang accompanied the emperor to Luoyang. He was distressed by the physical hold that Zhu had over the emperor and the imperial government, but did not dare to leave governmental service. After the emperor's arrival in Luoyang, he was made the minister of civil service affairs (吏部尚書, Libu Shangshu).

=== Chancellorship ===
Later in the year, Zhu Quanzhong had Emperor Zhaozong assassinated and replaced with his son Emperor Ai. In spring 905, Zhu further removed the chancellors Pei Shu, Dugu Sun, and Cui Yuan, believing the accusations of their fellow chancellor Liu Can that they would not be obedient to Zhu. In their place, Zhang Wenwei and Yang She were named chancellors, with the designations Tong Zhongshu Menxia Pingzhangshi (同中書門下平章事). It was said that Yang, who was peaceful and humble in disposition, wept with his family members upon hearing that he was commissioned a chancellor, and stated to his son Yang Ningshi (楊凝式) that this commission would surely bring disaster on Yang Ningshi. At that time, his younger brother Yang Zhu was an imperial scholar, and chose to resign to avoid appearance of impropriety.

In 907, Emperor Ai was preparing to yield the throne to Zhu. As part of the ceremonial passage of the throne, Yang, acting as Shizhong (侍中), the head of the examination bureau of government (門下省, Menxia Sheng), was put in delivering the main imperial seal to Zhu. (Yang Ningshi, pointing out that ceremonial, Yang would be terminating Tang dynasty, suggested that Yang She resign and let someone else carry out the duty; Yang She, fearful that this would bring disaster on the whole family, did not do so.) Yang She, as well as Zhang (who was to announce the passage of the throne to Zhu) and Xue Yiju (who was to deliver the secondary imperial seals), went in a grand procession from Luoyang to Daliang (i.e., the capital of Xuanwu Circuit), where Zhu was at the time, for the ceremony. Zhu accepted the throne, ending Tang and starting a new Later Liang (as its Emperor Taizu).

== During Later Liang ==
=== During Emperor Taizu's reign ===
Yang She continued as a chancellor of the new Later Liang until 908, when he was removed from the chancellor position and made You Puye (右僕射), one of the heads of the executive bureau. Later in the year, however, when he was Zuo Puye (左僕射) (also head of the executive bureau, but considered higher than You Puye), he was again made chancellor with the designation Tong Zhongshu Menxia Pingzhangshi, when one of the chancellors who replaced him, Zhang Ce, retired. He was again removed from his chancellor position in 909 and kept only the position of Zuo Puye. He apparently was also in charge of the imperial examinations, but was said to have had few accomplishments otherwise.

=== During Zhu Zhen's reign ===
At some point, Yang She must have returned to chancellorship, for he was described by the History of the Five Dynasties (which did not contain a biography for him) as a chancellor as of 915, by which point Emperor Taizu had died and his son Zhu Zhen was emperor. That year—when Yang, in addition to being chancellor, was said to be You Puye, Menxia Shilang (門下侍郎, the deputy head of the examination bureau), and the director of salt and iron monopoly, was removed from his chancellor post (after he had requested to resign due to illness) and made only Zuo Puye. In 916, he further retired from the Zuo Puye post and made a senior advisor to the Crown Prince—an entirely honorary post as there was no crown prince at the time. This was the last historical reference to Yang, and it is not known when he died.

== Notes and references ==
- Old Book of Tang, vol. 177.
- New Book of Tang, vol. 184.
- New History of the Five Dynasties, vol. 35.
- Zizhi Tongjian, vols. 265, 266, 267.
