= ShaoLan Hsueh =

Entrepreneur, investor and Chinese teacher

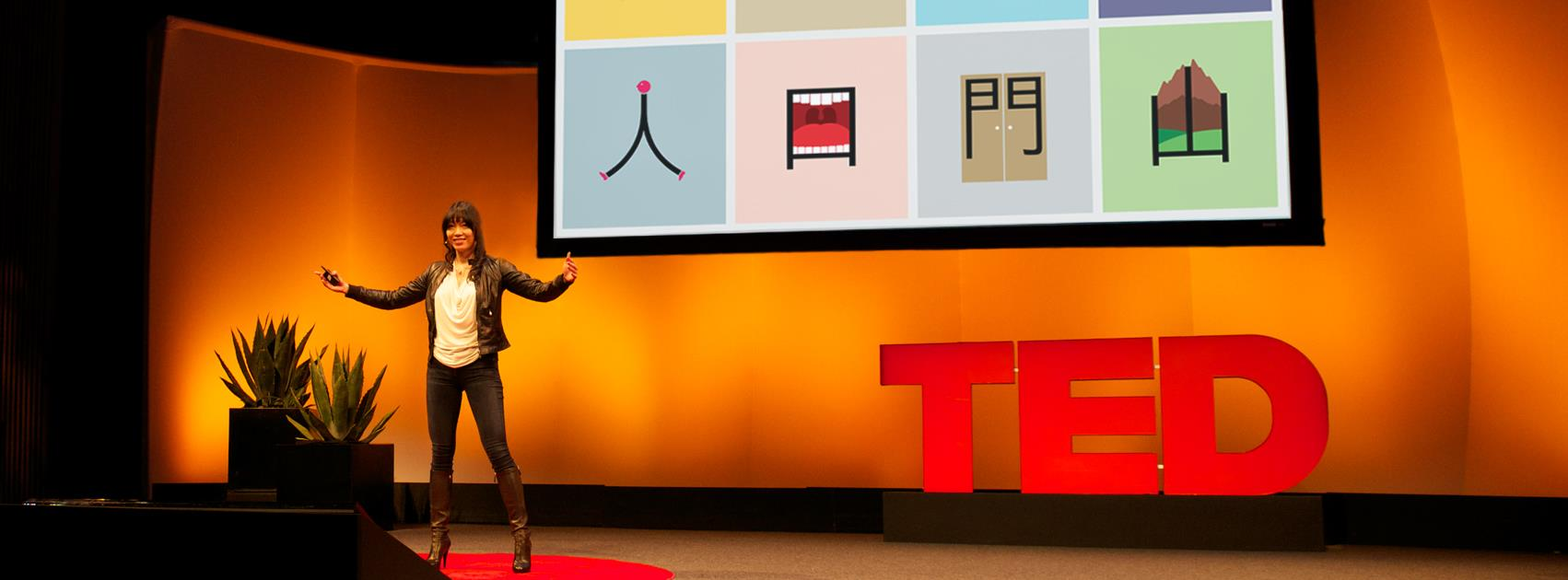
- Born: 薛曉嵐; Taipei, Taiwan
- Education: University of Cambridge; National Chengchi University; National Taiwan University
- Occupations: Author, designer, entrepreneur, venture capitalist
- Known for: Creator of Chineasy; podcasts
- Website: shaolan.com

ShaoLan Hsueh (also known as Heidi Hsueh; Chinese: 薛曉嵐; pinyin: Xuē Xiǎolán) is a London-based Taiwanese author, designer, venture capitalist, tech entrepreneur, podcast host, speaker, and the creator of Chinese language learning system Chineasy. As a college undergraduate in Taiwan, she wrote several bestselling software books that were widely distributed by Microsoft, and co-founded Internet company pAsia. In 2005, while studying for a master's degree at Cambridge, she founded Caravel Capital. Hsueh introduced Chineasy during a 2013 TED Talk, and subsequently authored several books and other learning tools to distribute the method.

== Early life and education ==
Hsueh was born in Taipei, to designers Hsueh RuiFang, a mathematician and engineer who became a noted ceramicist, and Lin FangZi, a calligrapher. She was raised in Taiwan with her sisters, Josephine and Anchi.

She received a Master of Business Administration from National Chengchi University in 1993, before moving to the United Kingdom, where she earned a MPhil from Newnham College, University of Cambridge.

== Career ==
While studying for her MBA, Hsueh wrote a Microsoft user manual, then three additional software books. These four best-selling books were bundled and distributed by Microsoft, with each awarded "book of the year" in Taiwan.

She co-founded pAsia, a major Internet company in Asia, with offices in Taipei and Beijing, that operated auction site Coolbid and social websites LoveTown and 8D8D, and developed and licensed proprietary technology, during the 1990s. PAsia investors included Intel, Goldman Sachs, and Citigroup. While obtaining a second master's degree, at the University of Cambridge, Hsueh founded technology startup advisory and investment firm Caravel Capital, in 2005.

=== Chineasy ===
While trying to teach Chinese to her two British-born children, Hsueh designed a pictogram-based learning system by analysing results of an algorithm to determine the most common "building blocks" in thousands of Chinese characters. In February 2013, she was invited to California to give a TED Talk, "Learn to read Chinese … with ease!", to introduce the method.

A subsequent, audience-generated blog then resulted in over 8,000 direct inquiries to Hsueh. A Kickstarter crowdfunding campaign followed, resulting in the March 2014 publication of her book, Chineasy: The New Way to Read Chinese, a collaboration with graphic artist Noma Bar, followed by a mobile app. The book has been translated and published in 19 languages.

Following the publication of her first Chineasy book, Hsueh authored Chineasy Everyday: The World of Chineasy Characters (2016), Chineasy Travel (2018), and Chineasy for Children (2018), as well as a workbook, flash cards, and other learning tools. Her mother has contributed calligraphy to Hsueh's publications.

In 2018, Chineasy launched its first app, Chineasy, teaching Chinese words on-the-go through flashcards and quizzes. The app was awarded as Editor's Choice and has reached number 2 in the UK and number 6 in the US Apple App Store's education category. It was featured on the new Apple Watch App Store during the keynote address at the 2019 Worldwide Developers Conference in San Jose. The Chineasy app is a 2022 Apple Design Award finalist for Delight & Fun.

== Media ==
Following her first TED Talk, in 2013, Hsueh gave a second one, in 2016, "The Chinese Zodiac Explained". She is a public speaker, and appeared on The Guilty Feminist, which was recorded live at Leicester Square Theatre, London. Hsueh also hosts the Talk Chineasy podcast, and hosts an eight-part Thrive Global podcast, How to Thrive: Lessons From Ancient Chinese Wisdom.

Named as one of 21 "Leading Ladies in Tech in 2015" by The Sunday Times, and as "The Woman uniting you with China", by Apple Inc.; on International Women's Day 2018, she was also noted as a "Person of Action" by Microsoft, which has twice featured her on Times Square billboard advertisements, in 2018 and 2019. Hsueh was named by Entrepreneur magazine as "one of the Six Women with Asian roots Redefining Creative Entrepreneurship" in 2019.

== Memberships ==
Hsueh is a member of Founders Pledge, and has served as a board member of various non-profit organisations in the UK, including Victoria and Albert Museum and Asia House. She has also been a member of the Business Advisory Council of Oxford University Saïd Business School. In 2021, she was appointed as the External Governor of the University of the Arts London (UAL).

== Personal life ==
Hsueh resides in London with her two children and is an avid skier. "Tennis, weight training, and hand-copying the Heart Sutra" is cited by Hsueh as the basis of her daily routine.
