= Zhang Ce =

Official of the Tang dynasty

Zhang Ce (張策) (died 912), courtesy name Shaoyi (少逸), was an official of the Chinese dynasty Tang dynasty and the succeeding Later Liang of the Five Dynasties and Ten Kingdoms period, serving as a chancellor during the reign of Later Liang's founding emperor Zhu Wen (Zhu Quanzhong).

== Background ==
It is not known when Zhang Ce was born. His family was originally from Dunhuang. His father Zhang Tong (張同) served as a Tang dynasty official and at one point reached the position of governor of Rong District (容管, headquartered in modern Yulin, Guangxi).

At one point, Zhang Ce lived with his family at a mansion in Luoyang. At that time, an ancient-looking ornate ding was found in a well, that bore, in seal script, the inscription, "Sculpted by Ji Qian [(吉千)] in the spring, the second month, of the first year of Wei's Huangchu [(黃初)] era [(i.e., 220)]." Zhang Tong much valued the find, but Zhang Ce, who was then only 12 years old, calmly stated to his father:

In the 25th year of the Jian'an [(建安))] era, the Lord Cao died. The era name was changed to Yankang [(延康)]. The 10th month of that year, Emperor Wen accepted Han Dynasty's offer of the throne, and at that point he declared the era name Huangchu. Therefore, there was no second month in the first year of Huangchu. How wrong this text was!

Zhang Tong was surprised by his son's assertion, and checked with the records of the Cao Wei portion of the Records of the Three Kingdoms, which verified what Zhang Ce stated. The entire clan was amazed at Zhang Ce's knowledge. However, instead of going into Confucian studies and preparing for an official career, Zhang Ce was devoted to Buddhism in his youth. Even before he took adult clothes, he decided to take tonsure and became a monk at Ci'en Temple (慈恩寺) at the Tang imperial capital Chang'an.

Late in the Guangming (880-881) era of Emperor Xizong of Tang, the Chang'an region came under attack by the major agrarian rebel Huang Chao. Hearing of the attack, Zhang Ce returned to civilian status so that he could take his parents to flee the disaster, and was much praised by the gentry who heard of this action. His father died soon thereafter, and he observed a period of mourning. Even after the period of mourning was over, however, for over a decade he did not seek an official appointment, but rather effectively became a hermit in the wilderness.

== Governmental career ==
=== During the Tang dynasty ===
After spending the time in the wilderness for over a decade, Zhang Ce entered imperial government service and served as a scholar at Guangwen Pavilion (廣文館), and later Mishu Lang (秘書郎), an assistant at the Palace Library. When the warlord Wang Xingyu served as the military governor (Jiedushi) of Jingnan Circuit (靜難, headquartered in modern Xianyang, Shaanxi), he invited Zhang to serve on his staff, as Guangcha Zhishi (觀察支使), an assistant to him in his role as governor (觀察使, Guanchashi). Later, when Wang ran into disputes with the imperial government and was attacked and defeated by Li Keyong the military governor of Hedong Circuit (河東, headquartered in modern Taiyuan, Shanxi), Zhang, along with a servant girl, personally bore a litter to put his mother on, so that they could flee Jingnan's capital Bin Prefecture (邠州), through the snow. Fellow refugees sympathized with him, and this news spread. When Li Keyong's archrival Zhu Quanzhong the military governor of Xuanwu Circuit (宣武, headquartered in modern Kaifeng, Henan) heard of this, he invited Zhang to serve as his assistant in his role as governor of Xuanyi Circuit (宣義, headquartered in modern Anyang, Henan). However, soon thereafter, Zhang's mother died, so he left governmental service to observe a period of mourning for her.

After Zhang's period of mourning was over, he returned to the imperial government to serve as Guozi Boshi (國子博士), a professor at the national university (國子監, Guozi Jian), and then Shanbu Yuanwailang (膳部員外郎), a low-level official at the ministry of rites (禮部, Lǐbu). After less than a year, the warlord Han Jian the military governor of Zhenguo Circuit (鎮國, headquartered in modern Weinan, Shaanxi) invited Zhang to serve as his secretary, and later, when Han became the military governor of Zhongwu Circuit (忠武, headquartered in modern Xuchang, Henan), Zhang served as chief secretary. During the Tianfu (901-904) era of Emperor Xizong's brother and successor Emperor Zhaozong, there was an occasion when Han had Zhang bear letters and gifts from Han to Zhu; when Zhu saw Zhang, he gladly stated, "Professor Zhang is here." He retained Zhang to serve as chief secretary on his own staff. Early in the Tianyou era (starting 904, shared between Emperor Zhaozong and his son and successor Emperor Ai), Zhu recommended Zhang to serve as Zhifang Langzhong (職方郎中), a supervisory official at the ministry of civil service affairs (吏部, Lìbu, note different tone than the ministry of rites) and an editor of imperial histories. He was soon thereafter made an imperial scholar (翰林學士, Hanlin Xueshi) and Bingbu Langzhong (兵部郎中), a supervisory official at the ministry of defense (兵部, Bingbu); he was also in charge of drafting edicts and editing the imperial history. Shortly after, he was made Zhongshu Sheren (中書舍人), a mid-level official at the legislative bureau (中書省, Zhongshu Sheng), but bore much of the same responsibilities. In 907, when Zhu had Emperor Ai yield the throne to him, ending Tang and starting a new Later Liang as its Emperor Taizu, Zhang served as the assistant to the chancellor Yang She in bearing the imperial seal to Xuanwu's capital Daliang for the ceremony.

=== During Later Liang ===
After Emperor Taizu took the throne as Later Liang emperor, Zhang Ce was made the deputy minister of public works (工部侍郎, Gongbu Shilang) as well as chief imperial scholar (翰林學士承旨, Hanlin Xueshi Chengzhi). Later that year, he was made the deputy minister of rites (禮部侍郎, Lǐbu Shilang). In 908, he accompanied Emperor Taizu on his campaign against rival state Jin (then ruled by Li Keyong's son and successor Li Cunxu). Shortly after, he was made deputy minister of justice (刑部侍郎, Xingbu Shilang) and a chancellor, with the designation Tong Zhongshu Menxia Pingzhangshi (同中書門下平章事), along with Yu Jing (于兢), replacing Yang She. He was also put in charge of the directorate of taxation (判戶部, Pan Hubu) and shortly after made Zhongshu Shilang (中書侍郎), the deputy head of the legislative bureau.

== Retirement and death ==
In late 908, Zhang Ce sought retirement due to illness. He returned to Luoyang. He spent the rest of his years on his garden planting trees, and enjoying books, music, and wine. He died in the fall of 912. He left a collection of his works — three volumes of his policy arguments in front of the emperor, 20 volumes of poetry and songs he wrote, and 30 volumes of his communiques.

== Notes and references ==
- History of the Five Dynasties, vol. 18.
- New History of the Five Dynasties, vol. 35.
- Zizhi Tongjian, vols. 266, 267.
