= Charles Xue =

Chinese-American entrepreneur (born 1953)

- Born: February 18, 1953 (age 73); Guangdong, China
- Citizenship: United States
- Education: Chinese Academy of Social Sciences; UC Berkeley
- Occupation: Entrepreneur
- Years active: 1991–present
- Spouses: Hu An (former); Ding Wei (current)
- Children: 2
- Parent: Xue Zizheng

Chinese name
- Chinese: 薛必群
Transcriptions
Standard Mandarin
- Hanyu Pinyin: Xuē Bìqún

Xue Manzi
- Traditional Chinese: 薛蠻子
- Simplified Chinese: 薛蛮子
Transcriptions
Standard Mandarin
- Hanyu Pinyin: Xuē Mánzǐ

Charles Bi-chuen Xue (Chinese: 薛必群; pinyin: Xuē Bìqún) is a Chinese-American entrepreneur and angel investor, better known by his screen name Xue Manzi. He was one of the founders of UTStarcom, the Chairman of 8848 Electronic Commerce Network, the Chairman of Prcedu.

== Biography ==
Xue was born in Guangdong Province in 1953. His father, Xue Zizheng, was the vice minister of the United Front Work Department. During his childhood, Xue lived in Toufa Hutong, Beijing. In 1966 when Xue was thirteen years old, the Cultural Revolution was launched by Mao Zedong, during which his father Xue Zizheng was isolated and jailed.

Two years later, Xue went to Urad Front Banner to work as a Sent-down youth in the Down to the Countryside Movement.

In 1976, Xue worked at Wenwu Publisher as an editor, and started to learn English from Xiao Qian, Shen Congwen and Li Jianwu. He translated the White House Guard into Chinese with his friend and got 468 yuan.

In 1978, Xue was accepted to the Chinese Academy of Social Sciences, he entered UC Berkeley in 1980, and he made the acquaintance of Masayoshi Son, Lu Hongliang, and Stan Lai. Before graduating, Xue was employed in New York City. After graduating, Xue worked in ThyssenKrupp. In June 1991, Xue returned to Beijing, he founded Unitech with Lu Hongliang and Wang Zuguang.

In 2011, Xue founded 8848 Electronic Commerce Network. In 2008, Xue settled back in Beijing with his wife and children. In August 2013, Xue attended a meeting which was convened by Lu Wei, the Chairman of the State Council Information Office.

On 23 August 2013, Xue was arrested for soliciting a prostitute by the Beijing Municipal Public Security Bureau. But Xue's real offense was his custom of sharing his ideas about corruption and political reform with his more than twelve-million followers on Weibo. Xue's arrest is regarded as part of China authority's plan to take back control of public opinion online. Later Xue apologized on CCTV, explaining that he came across prostitution while working abroad in countries like Thailand and the Netherlands. In his public apology, he explained that he often "did not verify the facts very thoroughly," "did not give constructive advice or opinion," and "focused simply on spreading the message" in his Weibo posts that he said were "full of emotion." Xue was released on bail in April 2014 "because he was sick," according to the Beijing police.
