= Xue Yiju =

Tang dynasty politician

Xue Yiju (Chinese: 薛貽矩; died May 25, 912), courtesy name Xiyong (熙用) or Shizhan (式瞻), was an official of the Chinese Tang dynasty and the subsequent Later Liang, serving as a chancellor during Later Liang.

== Background ==
It is not known when Xue Yiju was born. His family claimed ancestry from Wenxi (聞喜, in modern Yuncheng, Shanxi) and original descent from the mythical emperor Zhuanxu. Xue Yiju's traceable ancestry included officials of the Han dynasty, Shu Han, Cao Wei, Jin dynasty (266–420), and the Tang dynasty—including a line of relatively minor officials. Xue Yiju's grandfather Xue Cuncheng (薛存誠) served as an imperial attendant, while his father Xue Tingwang (薛廷望) served as a prefectural prefect. both were said to have had good reputations.

== During Tang dynasty ==
Xue Yiju himself was said to be known for elegance and handsomeness. He also associated with other people known for intelligence and elegance and became known as a writer of some renown. He passed the imperial examinations in the Jinshi class during the Qianfu era (874–879) of Emperor Xizong of Tang. He thereafter served in a progression of low-level offices in the imperial government – surveyor of budgetary matters (度支巡官, Duzhi Xunguan), assistant at Jixian Institute (集賢院), Shiyi (拾遺, low-level advisory official), Dianzhong Shiyushi (殿中侍御史, imperial censor), and Qiju Sheren (起居舍人, imperial chronicler). He later was made an imperial scholar (翰林學士, Hanlin Xueshi), along with Libu Yuanwailang (禮部員外郎), a low-level official at the ministry of rites (禮部, Lǐbu), and put in charge of drafting imperial edicts. He was later promoted to be Sixun Langzhong (司勳郎中), a supervisory official at the ministry of civil service affairs (吏部, Lìbu, note different tone than the ministry of rites).

When Emperor Xizong's brother and successor Emperor Zhaozong fled the imperial capital Chang'an in 895 as he was fearful of an attack by the warlords Li Maozhen the military governor (Jiedushi) of Fengxiang Circuit (鳳翔, headquartered in modern Baoji, Shaanxi) and Wang Xingyu the military governor of Jingnan Circuit (靜難, headquartered in modern Xianyang, Shaanxi), Xue, instead of immediately following the emperor in flight, was gathering up family members and therefore did not catch up with the emperor; for this reason, he was removed from his offices. However, he was shortly recalled to the imperial government to serve as Zhongshu Sheren (中書舍人), a mid-level official at the legislative bureau of government (中書省, Zhongshu Sheng) and again became an imperial scholar. He subsequently successively served as the deputy minister of census (戶部侍郎, Hubu Shilang) and of defense (兵部侍郎, Bingbu Shilang), and became chief imperial scholar (翰林學士承旨, Hanlin Xueshi Chengzhi). When Emperor Zhaozong, at the behest of the chancellor Cui Yin and the powerful warlord Zhu Quanzhong the military governor of Xuanwu Circuit (宣武, headquartered in modern Kaifeng, Henan), slaughtered the eunuchs in 903, Xue was found to have painted portraits for some of the slaughtered eunuchs, including Han Quanhui, and therefore was exiled.

Early in the Tianyou era (904–907, overlapping the reigns of Emperor Zhaozong and Emperor Zhaozong's son and successor Emperor Ai), by which time Zhu had forced the imperial government to relocate from Chang'an to Luoyang, an edict was issued commissioning Xue as the deputy minister of civil service affairs (吏部侍郎, Libu Shilang), but Xue did not report to Luoyang to take office. Zhu was said to have respected Xue, and therefore had another edict issued making Xue the minister of civil service affairs (吏部尚書, Libu Shangshu); Xue apparently accepted this office. He was subsequently made chief imperial censor (御史大夫, Yushi Daifu).

In spring 907, by which time it was becoming clear that Zhu would eventually take over the throne, Emperor Ai sent Xue to Zhu's headquarters at Daliang to greet Zhu. Xue requested to meet Zhu as if he were a subject of Zhu's—i.e., treating Zhu as an emperor. Zhu initially declined, but ascended stairs. Xue then stated:

Your Royal Highness has shown your accomplishments and virtues to men, and therefore the hearts of Heaven, Earth, and men have turned to you. The Emperor is about to carry out what Shun did to Yu [(i.e., yield the throne to Zhu)]. How can I dare to disobey these directives?

He, therefore, pursuant to ceremony due an emperor at the time, danced to show respect to Zhu toward the north. Zhu only turned his body sideways to show slight humility. Once Xue returned to Luoyang, he reported to Emperor Ai that Zhu was ready to accept the throne, so Emperor Ai prepared to yield the throne. Two months later, with a grand procession from Luoyang to Daliang, Xue (in charge of the secondary imperial seals), along with the chancellors Zhang Wenwei (who was to announce the passage of the throne to Zhu) and Yang She (who was to deliver the primary imperial seal), led the ceremony where Zhu accepted the throne, ending Tang and starting Later Liang, with Zhu as its Emperor Taizu. It was said that when Emperor Taizu held a feast for the Tang officials who participated in the ceremony, most Tang officials were humiliated and did not speak, but Xue, Su Xun (蘇循), and Zhang Yi (張禕) spoke in praising the new emperor for his accomplishments.

== During Later Liang ==
Shortly after the dynastic transition, Emperor Taizu made Xue Yiju Zhongshu Shilang (中書侍郎, deputy head of the legislative bureau) and gave him the designation Tong Zhongshu Menxia Pingzhangshi (同中書門下平章事), making him a chancellor. He also served as the director of taxation. In 908, he was made Menxia Shilang (門下侍郎, deputy head of the examination bureau (門下省, Menxia Sheng)), and put in charge of editing the imperial history; he also served as the director of budget. He was later given the additional title of imperial scholar at Hongwen Institute (弘文館) and director of salt and iron monopolies. It was said that during his years as chancellor, however, he had no particular accomplishments. In 912, after accompanying Emperor Taizu on a campaign against Later Liang's rival state Jin, he fell ill, and died shortly after returning to Luoyang. He was given posthumous honors.

== Notes and references ==
- History of the Five Dynasties, vol. 18.
- New History of the Five Dynasties, vol. 35.
- Zizhi Tongjian, vols. 266, 268.
