= Seol (surname) =

Korean surname

- Pronunciation: Seol, Sul, Sol
- Language: Korean

Origin
- Region of origin: Korea

- Seol
- Hangul: 설
- Hanja: 薛; 偰
- RR: Seol
- MR: Sŏl

Seol (also spelled as Sul or Sol) is a Korean family name, spelled 설 in Hangul and 薛 or 偰 in Hanja.

== People who have this name include ==
- Amy Sol (born 1981), American artist
- Seol Chong (650–730), Silla Dynasty scholar
- Sul Hoon (born 1953), South Korean activist and politician
- Seol In-ah (born 1996), South Korean actress
- Seol Jae-min (born 1990), South Korean tennis player
- Seol Jung-hwan (born 1985), South Korean actor and model
- Sol Kyong (born 1990), North Korean judoka
- Sul Kyung-gu (born 1968), South Korean actor
- Seol Ki-hyeon (born 1979), South Korean former professional footballer
- Seol Min-kyung (born 1960), South Korean former tennis player
- Seol Sa (Won Hyo) (617–686), Silla Dynasty monk
- Seol Ye-eun (born 1996), South Korean curler
- Seol Young-woo (born 1998), South Korean professional footballer
- Seol Yoon-ah (born 2004), known as Sullyoon, South Korean singer and member of girl group Nmixx

== Lineages ==
The Korean family name Seol can be written with either of two homophonous hanja. Each of those three are broken down into a number of clans, identified by their bongwan (clan hometown, not necessarily the actual residence of the clan members), which indicate different lineages.

- More common: 薛 (맑은대쑥 설 malgeundaessuk seol)
- Less common: 偰 (맑을 설 malgeul seol)
