= Xue Zizheng =

Chinese politician

- 薛子正

Deputy Head of the United Front Work Department of the CCP Central Committee
- In office March 1958 – December 1966
- Head: Li Weihan → Xu Bing

Personal details
- Born: 1905 Lirang Town, Liangshan County, Sichuan, Qing China
- Died: 1980 (aged 74–75) Beijing, China
- Party: Chinese Communist Party
- Children: Charles Xue (adopted son)
- Education: Shanghai University; Communist University of the Toilers of the East; Lenin Military-Political Academy

Xue Zizheng (Chinese: 薛子正; pinyin: Xuē Zǐzhèng; 1905 - 1980) was a Chinese politician who served as deputy head of the United Front Work Department of the Central Committee of the Chinese Communist Party between 1958 and 1966.

== Biography ==
Xue was born in Lirang Town of Liangshan County in Sichuan Province of China in 1905, which was during the Qing Dynasty. In his early years, he studied at school in Wuchang and Nanjing. He is a graduate of Shanghai University, Communist University of the Toilers of the East, and Lenin Military-Political Academy.

In 1926, Xue joined the Chinese Communist Party (CCP). He took part in the Third Rebellion of Shanghai Workers (上海工人第三次武装举事). Xue worked in Eastern Jiangxi Communist-controlled China (赣东东北革命根据地) in 1930, then worked in Minbei Communist-controlled China (闽北革命根据地), he was transferred to Jiangxi Military District (江西军区) in 1934.

After 1949, Xue served as the deputy mayor of Beijing, the vice chairman of State Economic and Trade Commission, the deputy head of the United Front Work Department of the CCP Central Committee, the deputy secretary general of the Chinese People's Political Consultative Conference, and member of the Central Commission for Discipline Inspection.

In July 1980, Xue died in Beijing.

== Personal life ==
Xue has an adopted son named Charles Xue who acquired American citizenship.
