= Noma Bar =

Israeli graphic designer, illustrator and artist

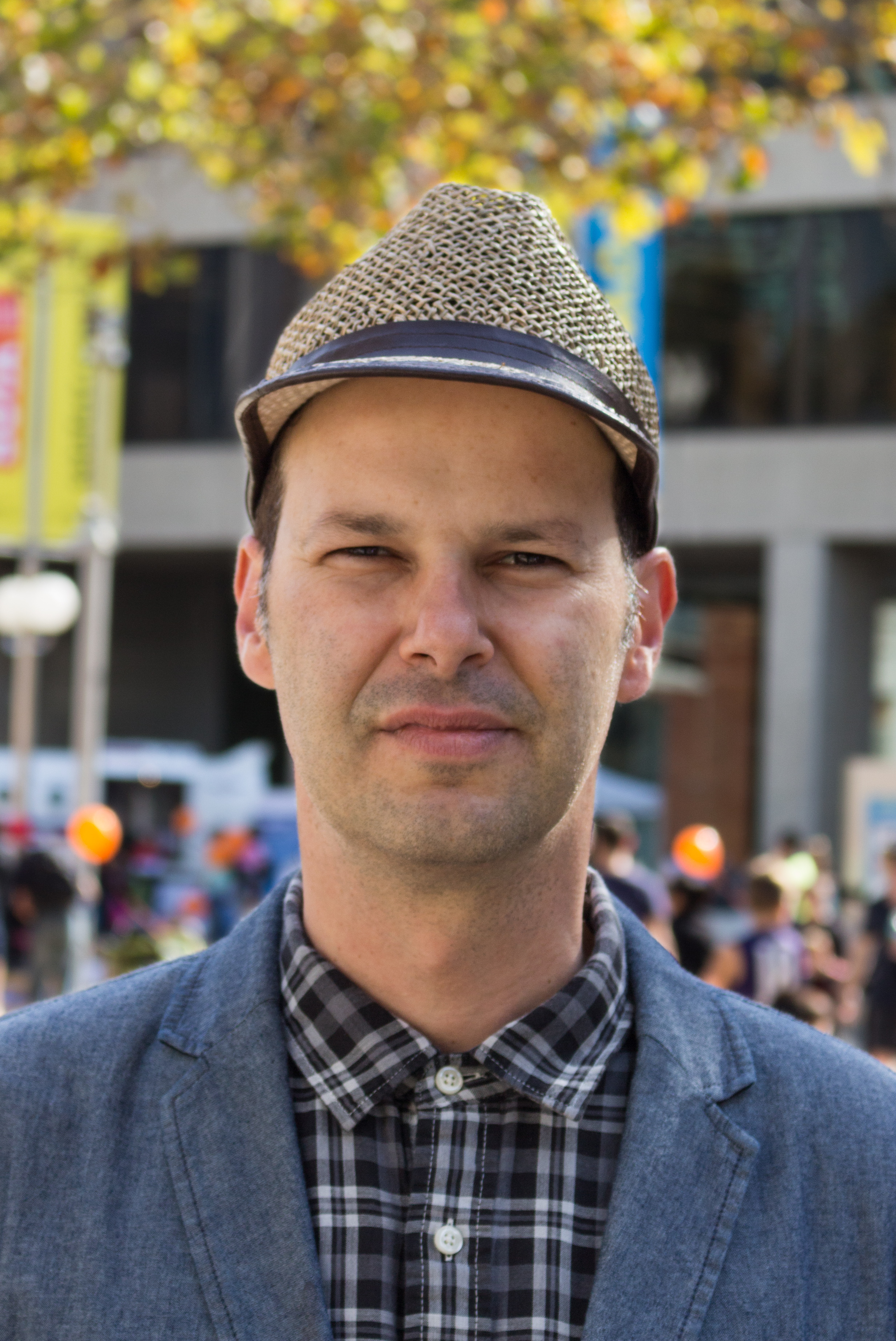
- Noma Bar
- Born: 1973 (age 52–53)
- Education: Bezalel Academy of Arts and Design
- Occupations: Graphic designer, illustrator and artist
- Years active: 2001–present
- Known for: Negative Space

Noma Bar (born 1973) is a graphic designer, illustrator and artist. Bar's work has been described as "deceptively simple", featuring flat colours, minimal detail and negative space to create images that often carry double meanings that are not immediately apparent. Bar himself outlines his approach as avoiding unnecessary detail or decoration that might detract from an image's message, instead aiming for 'maximum communication with minimal elements.'

Based in London since 2000, his illustrations appear internationally in newspapers, magazines, book covers and advertising campaigns. Publications that have featured his work include The New Yorker, The Guardian, The New York Times, Time Out London, GQ, The Economist, Wallpaper* and Esquire. Bar works on campaigns for companies such as Apple, Google, Sony, Nike, IBM and Coca-Cola, as well as for public institutions like the V&A, the BBC, NewYork–Presbyterian Hospital and BAFTA. He also designs book covers, including covers for book series by the authors Don DeLilo and Haruki Murakami, as well as releasing three books of his own work: Guess Who?: The Many Faces of Noma Bar (2008), Negative Space (2009), and Bittersweet (2017), a five-volume retrospective.

As well as appearing in print, Bar's work has also been featured in exhibitions, talks and festivals and, in recent years, has branched out to include prints, 3D sculpture, architecture and animation. He has been the recipient of a Gold Clio award, a D&AD Yellow Pencil, Cannes Lions Gold and Silver prizes, a Gold Epica Award and won 'Life-enhancer of the Year' at the Wallpaper* Design Awards.

== Career ==
=== Early work and influences ===
Bar began drawing as a child, making caricatures of his teachers at school. His childhood neighbour made sculptures out of spare farm machinery; he later recalled how it showed him that 'you could take something and make it into something radically different, just by composition. That is the basis of all my work now.'

His first notable portrait in the style for which he would later become recognised was made as a teenager; whilst taking refuge in a bomb shelter during the 1990-91 Gulf War, he noticed a similarity in appearance between a radioactivity symbol in a newspaper he was reading and the face of the then President of Iraq, Saddam Hussein, and used this resemblance to create a minimalist portrait of the Iraqi leader.

Bar went on to study graphic design, calligraphy and typography at the Jerusalem Academy of Art where he developed his simple, pared down signature style, taking inspiration from the art of Russian Constructivism, Soviet-era propaganda posters, Art Deco film posters and the designs of the Bauhaus, amongst others. He has also later cited the influence of several individual artists and designers on his work, including Milton Glaser, Paul Rand, Saul Bass, Gary Hume, and Constantin Brâncuși. Outside of fine art and design, Bar has talked about his love for the silent movies of Charlie Chaplin, saying Chaplin's ability to 'tell stories without words' is something he tries to emulate in his own work.

=== Professional career ===
After graduating in 2000, Bar moved to London, settling in Highgate. Bar's work was published for the first time shortly after, a full page illustration of William Shakespeare, accompanying an article in Time Out London.

Over the next years, Bar was commissioned to produce dozens of illustrations that appeared in a number of different major publications, including a portrait of George W. Bush that referenced the Abu Ghraib torture scandal, for The Guardian, and an image of Adolf Hitler, for an Esquire UK article on the growing market for books on Nazism, that replaced the dictator's infamous moustache with a barcode. In 2007, Bar published his first book, Guess Who?: The Many Faces of Noma Bar, which featured a selection of previously published images of well-known famous figures, past and present.

A year later, this was followed up with a second book, Negative Space (2009), which looked more broadly at Bar's other illustrations as well as his portraits, focusing on his technique of utilising negative space to create images with hidden double meanings relating to their original subjects.

In 2010, Bar began showing his work internationally in exhibitions, turning some of his works into 3D sculptures for the first time. For the major show Cut It Out, part of the 2011 London Design Festival celebrations, he created an innovative print cutting machine that members of the public could use to create their own personalised artworks using Bar's designs. The size of a human adult, the imposing, dog-shaped machine was hugely popular, with people queuing to make a cut-out print with a wide variety of materials that they chose to bring along. In 2013, he took the successful concepts from Cut It Out further, developing a whole new project and exhibition in 2013, called Cut the Conflict, in which people affected by wars around the world were invited to send in materials to be printed with Bar's designs based on motifs of peace. These cut-outs were then combined to make works that contained only materials from two countries in conflict with one another, making Cut the Conflict a celebrated project which has personally stood out for Bar.

By 2011, Bar was receiving industry recognition for his work, collecting awards from, amongst others, the Cannes Lions and New York Festivals International Advertising Awards for his work on IBM's Smarter Planet campaign, and being awarded a D&AD Yellow Pencil for his series of Don Delilo book covers. For his involvement with the two language learning books, Chineasy: The New Way to Read Chinese, he won 'Life-enhancer of the Year' at the Wallpaper* Design Awards 2014, as well as two further D&AD Wood Pencils, a European Product Design Award and a nomination for 'Design of the Year' by the Design Museum.

In recent years, Bar's work has expanded further beyond print. In 2012, The Guardian released a range of notebooks featuring Bar's designs and his illustrations have since featured on limited edition drinks cans and London Underground Oyster card holders. Also in 2012, Bar created a number of room installations that were then photographed to create a series of trompe-l'œil covers for Wallpaper* magazine. In 2015, Bar translated his illustrations into architecture for the first time, when invited by the Momofuku Centre to create a viewhouse in the wooded area near the Centre, in Komoro, Japan. The bird-shaped design was influenced by falling leaves in the surrounding forest and provided a spectacular 'bird's eye' view of the countryside. Since that year, Bar has also made a number of animated shorts in his trademark style: one for Mercedes Benz, another for the World Food Programme and a Gold Clio award-winning short for the NewYork–Presbyterian Hospital's immunotherapy cancer treatment programme, that was shown during the 2016 Super Bowl and was seen by over 40 million people. This last animation was added to MoMA's permanent collection in 2016.

2017 saw the release of Bar's third and most recent book, Bittersweet. A overview of all the work of his career to date, the book comes in two versions, a 395-page paperback edition and a 680-page, 5 volume monograph, published by Thames & Hudson.

== Publications ==
=== Publications by Bar ===
- Guess Who?: The Many Faces of Noma Bar. Brooklyn, New York: Mark Batty, 2008. ISBN 978-0977985074. With an introduction by Steven Heller.
- Negative Space. Brooklyn, New York: Mark Batty, 2009. ISBN 978-0981780559.
- Bittersweet (Limited Edition). London: Thames & Hudson, 2017. ISBN 978-0500094006. 5 volumes. Edition of 1000 copies. A retrospective.

=== Publication with contributions by Bar ===
- Chineasy: The New Way to Read Chinese. London: Thames & Hudson, 2014. By Shaolan Hsueh. ISBN 978-0500650288.

== Exhibitions ==
=== Solo exhibitions ===
- 2010: Bitter/Sweet, KK Outlet, London.
- 2011: Cut It Out, Outline Editions gallery, London, part of London Design Festival 2011. Following the London Design Festival, 'Cut It Out' travelled to the BALTIC Centre, Gateshead, for the 2011 Design Event Festival.
- 2013: Cut the Conflict, Rook & Raven Gallery, London.
- 2014: Look Out, Noma Bar, L'Imprimerie gallery, Paris. Artwork and sculpture.
- 2017: Bittersweet, Gallerie d'Italia, Vicenza.

=== Group exhibitions ===
- 2009: Paper City: Urban Utopias, Royal Academy of Arts, London.
- 2009: Tart Cards, KK Outlet, London.
- 2009: Just What I Never Wanted, KK Outlet, London.
- 2010: What's Up With Illustration II, Mauger Modern Art, London.
- 2010: More is a Bore, Ship of Fools gallery, The Hague.
- 2011: Object Abuse, KK Outlet, London.
- 2012: Cut Out The Light, Scin Gallery, London.
- 2012: Deck the Walls, Lomography Gallery, London.
- 2013: Moleskine Sketch Relay, V&A museum, London, part of London Design Festival 2013.
- 2013: Un homme juste est quand même un homme mort, Palais de Tokyo, Paris.
- 2015: The Art of Ping Pong, Fivefootsix charity auction for BBC Children in Need.
- 2015: Group exhibition, Berga Urban Museum, Vicenza.
- 2016: A Smile in the Mind, Foyles Gallery, London, part of London Design Festival 2016.
- 2016: Where do ideas come from?, Assembly House, Newcastle upon Tyne, part of Northern Design Festival 2016.

== Awards ==
- 2010: Wood Pencil, D&AD Professional Awards, Illustration/Book Design category, for his book Negative Space.
- 2010: Gold, Epica Awards, Press Campaign category, for his IBM poster campaign.
- 2011: Silver, Clio Award, Design category; Silver & Bronze, London International Awards; Gold & Silver, Cannes Lions International Festival of Creativity; Bronze, New York Festivals International Advertising Awards; for his IBM poster campaign.
- 2011: Wood Pencil, D&AD Professional Awards, Illustration category, for Ethnic Multicultural Media Academy (EMMA) Trust campaign.
- 2011: Bronze & Merit, Clio Award; Merit, One Show award; Bronze, New York Festivals International Advertising Awards; for his Der Spiegel magazine and poster campaign.
- 2012: Nominated, Design Museum's Designs of the Year 2012, Graphics Category, for his Cut It Out exhibition.
- 2012: Gold & Silver, Creative Circle, for his V&A Museum of Childhood poster and ITV Injustice poster respectively.
- 2012: Winner, British Book Design & Production Awards, Brand/Series Identity category; Yellow Pencil, D&AD Professional Awards, Book Design: Book Front Covers category, for his Don DeLillo book covers.
- 2013: Best Cover Design, Society of Publication Designers award, for his De Volkskrant cover.
- 2013: Best Cover list, New York Times, for his Fear of Flying book cover.
- 2013: Included in AdAge Creative 50, a list of influential industry figures.
- 2014: Award of Excellence, Society for News Design, for his Financial Times Weekend Magazine cover.
- 2014-2017: 'Life-enhancer of the Year', Wallpaper* Design Awards 2014; 2 Wood Pencils, D&AD Professional Awards 2015; Gold Bar, YCN (You Can Now) Award 2015; 3 Gold & 1 Silver, European Product Design Award 2017; Silver, Parent's Choice Award 2017; Gold, Tillywig Brain Child Award 2017; for his illustration for Chineasy: The New Way to Read Chinese.
- 2015: Selected Winner, American Illustration Awards, for his illustration for Reader's Digest.
- 2016: Silver Medal & Award of Excellence, Society for News Design, for his David Ortiz Boston Globe cover.
- 2016: 2 Gold, Clio Awards; Best Design, Association of Independent Commercial Producers AICP Awards, entered into MoMA permanent collection; Winner, Brand Film Festival, Healthcare category; Second Prize Award, New York Festivals International Advertising Awards, Film Craft category; for his work on NewYork–Presbyterian's Unmasking a Killer animation short.
- 2017: Gold Prize, Brand Impact Awards, for his Alvogen Iceland ad campaign.
- 2017: Award of Excellence, Society for News Design, for his Guardian Brexit cover.
- 2018: Winner, The Academy of British Cover Design, Sci-Fi/Fantasy category, for his book cover for The Handmaid's Tale.
