= Xue Jiye =

Chinese painter and sculptor (born 1965)

Xue Jiye (Chinese: 薛继业; pinyin: Xuē Jìyè; born in 1965 in Dalian, Liaoning) is a Chinese painter and sculptor. He graduated from Guangzhou Academy of Fine Arts in 1988 and currently lives and works in Beijing.

Xue Jiye and his work have been featured in various art exhibitions both in China and abroad, including the Guangdong Art Museum, National Gallery of Indonesia, Kunstverein Manneim, etc. His contemporary artworks reflect human struggle in a surrealist style.
