= Xue (given name) =

Xue is the Mandarin Pinyin spelling of a Chinese given name. People with this name include:

- Bai Xue (born 1988), Chinese long-distance runner
- Han Xue (swimmer) (born 1981), Chinese Swimmer
- Han Xue (actress) (born 1983), Chinese Singer and actress
- Ju Xue (born 1968), Chinese actress
- Lam Suet (林雪; born 1964), or Lin Xue, Hong Kong film actor
- Li Xue (born 1985), Chinese-born French table tennis player
- Shen Xue (born 1978), Chinese retired pair skater
- Tan Xue (born 1984), Chinese fencer
- Wang Xue (gymnast) (born 1992), Chinese rhythmic gymnast
- Wang Xue (speed skater) (born 1993), short track speed skater
- Wu Xue (born 1980), Chinese-born table tennis player
- Zhang Xue (born 1964), Chinese geneticist
- Zhao Xue (born 1985), is a Chinese chess player

== Fictional characters ==
- Chen Xue (陈雪), a character in the Chinese television series You Are My Glory.
