= Francis Hsueh and Steven Hahn =

American filmmaking duo

Francis Hsueh and Steven Hahn (both born in October 1973) are a filmmaking duo based in New York City. Hsueh and Hahn were former corporate lawyers from large New York firms who met in 2004 after becoming solo practitioners. While working on their first case together, they realized that they shared the same dream of making movies. Later that year, they opened Omerice Works Inc., a film production company named after the Korean dish that their first client served them for lunch.

== Party ==
In fall 2005, Hsueh and Hahn completed their first film, Party, a feature-length documentary about New York's Asian nightlife. They shot, directed, edited, scored, produced and financed it themselves. The film features intersecting stories of several party promoters and partygoers, as well as a voiceover narration provided by Prof. Gary Okihiro of Columbia University. Party appeared at the 2007 Rotterdam Asiascope Overseas Asian Film Festival and was chosen for distribution by Pathfinder Pictures in 2006.

=== Screenings ===
- February 28, 2006 – University of North Carolina at Chapel Hill
- March 25, 2006 – Chinatown, NY Teabag Film Workshop
- April 18, 2006 – University of Virginia, Charlottesville
- April 26, 2006 – Barnard College, New York
- April 27, 2006 – State University of New York, Stony Brook
- April 29, 2006 – Carnegie Mellon University, Pittsburgh
- October 12, 2006 – Northeastern University, Boston
- October 18, 2006 – Columbia University, New York
- November 12, 2006 – Boston Asian American Film Festival
- April 2007 – Rotterdam Asiascope Overseas Asian Film Festival

== Pretty to Think So ==
In early 2006, Hsueh and Hahn began writing their first narrative script, Pretty to Think So, a love triangle story set in New York City in 2000. Based on the moderate success of Party, Hahn and Hsueh obtained financing from a Google executive, Michael Zee. In April 2007, they successfully completed photography on the film, which was premiered in March 2008 at the San Francisco International Asian American Film Festival. The film toured subsequent Asian American film festivals in Chicago, Los Angeles, Philadelphia and Austin, and had its East Coast premiere at the New York Asian American International Film Festival in July 2008.

Pretty to Think So, set in the post-internet boom, pre-9/11 limbo period of October 2000, tells the story of a tragic love triangle between Hanna (Pia Shah), a recently laid-off investment banker, Jiwon (Louis Ozawa Changchien), a corporate lawyer, and Alex (Rob Yang), a former street hustler turned youth pastor.

== Leo of St. George and the Air Galactic ==
In late 2006, inspired by news of Richard Branson's Virgin Galactic space tourism company (scheduled to be launched in 2009), Hsueh and Hahn completed their second feature-length script, Leo of St. George and the Air Galactic. In April 2008, the script was a finalist in the Beverly Hills Film Festival screenplay competition. In June 2008, the script won a prestigious fellowship from the Korean Film Council's Filmmakers Development Lab which promotes works by overseas Korean filmmakers (Hahn is Korean-American). The script also placed as a Semi-Finalist in the StoryPros 4th Annual International Screenplay Contest (2010).

== Festivals and awards ==
=== Party (Pathfinder Pictures) ===
Official Selection:

- 2007 Rotterdam Asiascope Overseas Asian Film Festival

=== Pretty to Think So ===
Official Selection:

- 2008 San Francisco International Asian American Film Festival
- 2008 Chicago Asian American Showcase
- 2008 Los Angeles Asian Pacific Film Festival
- 2008 New York Asian American International Film Festival
- 2008 Austin Asian American Film Festival
- 2008 Philadelphia Asian American Film Festival

=== Leo of St. George and the Air Galactic ===
- Quarter finalist, 15th Annual Writer's Network Screenplay & Fiction Competition
- Finalist, Beverly Hills Film Festival Screenplay Competition
- Fellow, Korean Film Council Development Lab
