= Emperor Ai of Tang =

Emperor of Tang China from 904 to 907

Emperor Ai of Tang 唐哀帝

Emperor of the Tang dynasty
- Reign: 26 September 904 – 12 May 907
- Predecessor: Emperor Zhaozong
- Successor: Dynasty abolished
- Born: Li Zuo; 27 October 892
- Died: 26 March 908 (aged 15)
- Burial: Wen Mausoleum (溫陵)
Full name
- Family name: Lǐ (李); Given name: Initially Zuò (祚), later Zhù (柷) (changed 904)
Era name and dates
- Tiānyòu (天祐) (inherited from Emperor Zhaozong): 28 May 904 – 12 May 907 (Note: However, after the end of Tang, the regional states Jin, Wu, and Qi continued to use Tang's Tianyou era name to show their refusal to recognize Later Liang. One can therefore also consider the end of the Tianyou era to be sometime early in 924, when Li Maozhen the Prince of Qi became a subject to Jin's successor state Later Tang and switched to Later Tang's Tongguang era.)
Posthumous name
- Emperor Ai (哀皇帝) (conferred by Later Liang) or Emperor Zhaoxuan (昭宣皇帝) (conferred by Later Tang) (short); Emperor Zhaoxuan Guanglie Xiao (昭宣光烈孝皇帝) (conferred by Later Tang) (full)
Temple name
- Jǐngzōng (景宗) (not commonly used)
- House: Li
- Dynasty: Tang
- Father: Emperor Zhaozong
- Mother: Empress Xuanmu

Tang Aidi
- Chinese: 唐哀帝
- Literal meaning: "Pitious Emperor of the Tang"
Transcriptions
Standard Mandarin
- Hanyu Pinyin: Táng Āidì

Li Zuo
- Chinese: 李祚
- Literal meaning: (personal name)
Transcriptions
Standard Mandarin
- Hanyu Pinyin: Lǐ Zuò

Emperor Ai of Tang (27 October 892 – 26 March 908), also known as Emperor Zhaoxuan of Tang (唐昭宣帝), born Li Zuo, later known as Li Zhu or Li Chu (李柷; Lǐ Chù), was the 23rd and last emperor of the Tang dynasty of China. He reigned—as a puppet ruler—from 904 to 907. Emperor Ai was the son of Emperor Zhaozong. He was murdered by Zhu Wen.

Emperor Ai ascended the throne at the age of 11 after his father, the Emperor Zhaozong, was assassinated on the orders of the paramount warlord Zhu Quanzhong in 904, and while Emperor Ai reigned, the Tang court, then at Luoyang, was under the control of officials Zhu put in charge. In 905, under the instigation of his associates Liu Can and Li Zhen, Zhu had Emperor Ai issue an edict summoning some 30 senior aristocrats at Baima Station (白馬驛, in modern Anyang, Henan), near the Yellow River; the aristocrats were thereafter ordered to commit suicide, and their bodies were thrown into the Yellow River. He could do nothing to stop Zhu from murdering his brothers and mother in the same year. Less than two years later in 907, Zhu made his final move against Emperor Ai himself, forcing the young emperor to abdicate to him. In Zhu's new Later Liang dynasty, the former Tang emperor carried the title of Prince of Jiyin, but in 908, Zhu had the prince poisoned, at the age of 15.

== Background ==
Li Zuo was born in 892, at the main palace at the Tang imperial capital Chang'an. His father Emperor Zhaozong was already emperor at that point, and he was Emperor Zhaozong's ninth son. His mother was Consort He, who had previously given birth to an older brother of his, Li Yu, Prince of De, who was Emperor Zhaozong's oldest son.

In 897, Li Zuo was created an imperial prince, along with his brothers Li Mi (李秘) and Li Qi (李祺); Li Zuo's title was Prince of Hui. Later in the year, with Li Yu having been created Crown Prince earlier in the year, their mother Consort He was created empress.

By 903, Zhu Quanzhong the military governor (Jiedushi) of Xuanwu Circuit (宣武, headquartered in modern Kaifeng, Henan), already previously one of the most powerful warlords in the Tang realm, had taken Emperor Zhaozong's court at Chang'an under control, in alliance with the chancellor Cui Yin. That year, Emperor Zhaozong was prepared to give Zhu the title of Deputy Generalissimo of All Circuits, with one of his sons serving, titularly, as Generalissimo, and he initially wanted to give that title to Li Yu as Li Yu was older. However, Zhu wanted a younger prince to serve as Generalissimo to avoid diverting the focus of authority, so Cui, under Zhu's orders, recommended Li Zuo. Emperor Zhaozong agreed and made Li Zuo Generalissimo.

In 904, Zhu forced Emperor Zhaozong to move the capital from Chang'an to Luoyang, which was even more firmly under his control. Later that year, fearing that the adult Emperor Zhaozong would try to rise against him while he was away on campaigns against other warlords, he had Emperor Zhaozong assassinated. Bypassing Li Yu and the other older princes, he had an edict issued in Emperor Zhaozong's name creating Li Zuo crown prince and changing his name to Li Chu. Shortly after, Li Chu took the throne (as Emperor Ai). Empress He, who survived the assassination, was honored empress dowager.

== Reign ==
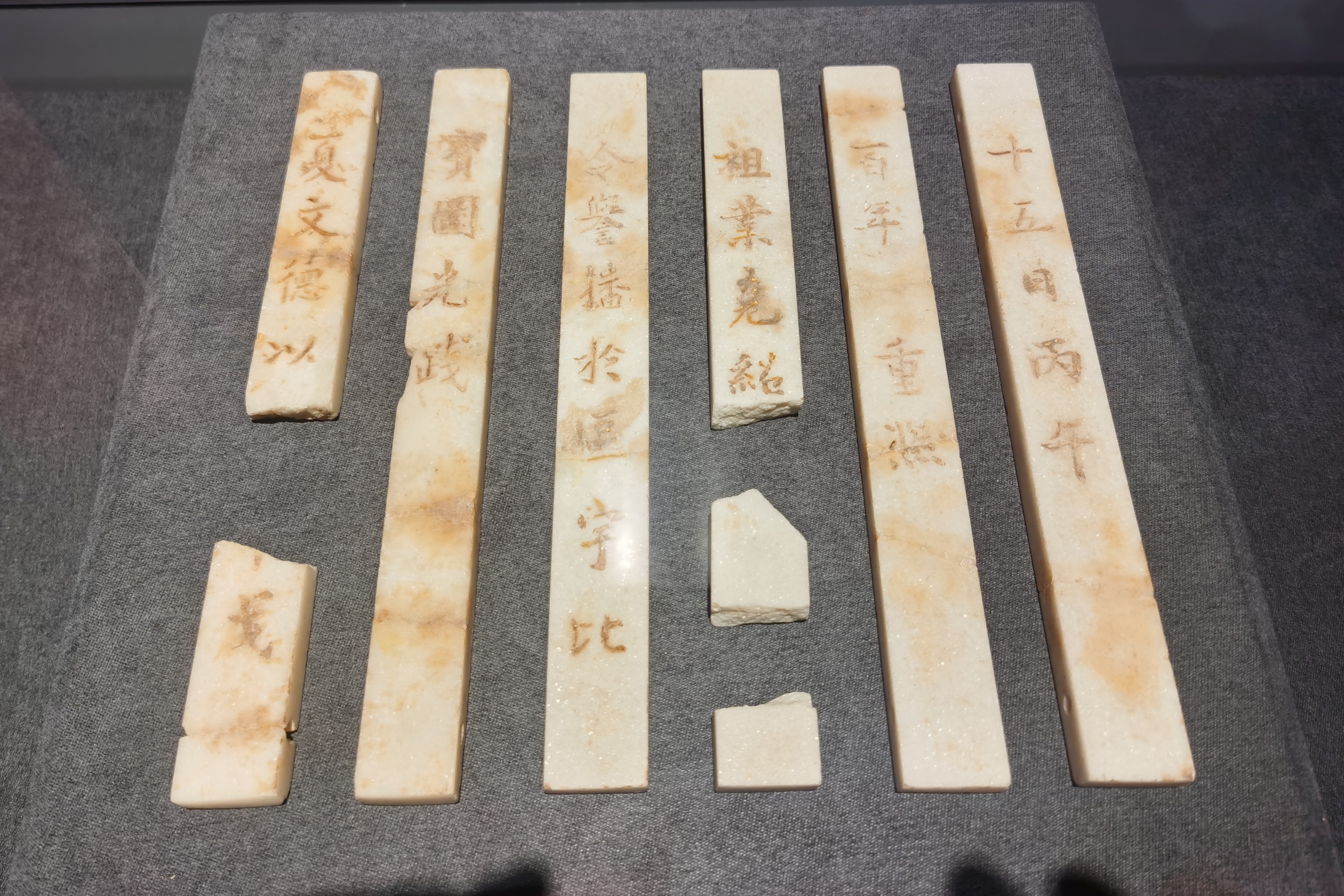
Jade documents commemorating the accession of Emperor Ai, recovered from the foundations of the Yingtian Gate, Luoyang

At the time Emperor Ai took the throne, one of the chancellors was Zhu Quanzhong's close associate Liu Can. Liu, not from an aristocratic family, resented the traditional aristocrats, and he advocated to Zhu that the senior aristocrats should be slaughtered to prevent them from resisting Zhu. Zhu agreed, and in 905, under edicts issued in Emperor Ai's name, some 30 of them were gathered at Baima Station and ordered to commit suicide; their bodies were then thrown into the Yellow River. The victims included the former chancellors Pei Shu, Dugu Sun, Cui Yuan, Lu Yi, and Wang Pu, as well as the senior officials Zhao Chong (趙崇) and Wang Zan (王贊). Around the same time, nine of Emperor Ai's brothers, including Li Yu, were also killed on Zhu's orders.

Meanwhile, Liu, as well as Zhu's other close associates at the Luoyang court, Jiang Xuanhui (蔣玄暉) the director of palace communications and Zhang Tingfan (張廷範) the commander of the imperial guards, were preparing ceremonies to have Emperor Ai yield the throne to Zhu. Pursuant to past precedents on dynastic transitions, they first had Emperor Ai issue edicts to create Zhu the Prince of Wei (魏王) and bestow on him the nine bestowments—but Zhu, wanting the throne even faster and believing false accusations by Wang Yin (王殷) and Zhao Yinheng that Jiang, Liu, and Zhang were intentionally slowing the transition down with these ceremonial formalities, then had Jiang, Liu, and Zhang put to death. Wang and Zhao then falsely accused Empress Dowager He, who had been cooperating with Jiang in the hopes that she and the young emperor would be spared, of carrying on an affair with Jiang. She was therefore also killed, and Emperor Ai was forced to posthumously have her defamed and demoted to commoner rank, although he was still allowed to mourn for her.

In 907, under advice from his ally Luo Shaowei the military governor of Weibo Circuit (魏博, headquartered in modern Handan, Hebei), Zhu finally resolved to take the throne. Later in the year, he had the young emperor yield the throne to him, ending Tang and starting a new Later Liang as its Emperor (Taizu)—although several regional warlords, including Li Keyong, Li Maozhen, Yang Wo, and Wang Jian, refused to recognize him, and effectively became rulers of their own states (Jin, Qi, Wu, and Former Shu, respectively). Of those new states, Jin, Qi, and Wu continued to use Emperor Ai's Tianyou era name, implicitly still recognizing him as emperor.

== Death ==
The new Later Liang emperor created Li Chu the Prince of Jiyin and moved him from Luoyang to Cao Prefecture (曹州, in modern Heze, Shandong), and put his mansion under heavy guard, with a fence of thorns surrounding it.

In 908, he had Li Chu poisoned to death and gave Li Chu the posthumous name of Ai (哀, "lamentable"). In 928, by which time Li Keyong's adoptive son Li Siyuan was ruling as the emperor of Jin's successor state Later Tang (as Emperor Mingzong), which claimed to be the legitimate continuation of the Tang dynasty and which had earlier destroyed Later Liang, Emperor Mingzong's officials suggested that a temple be built to honor Emperor Ai. Emperor Mingzong had such a temple built at Cao Prefecture. In 929, Emperor Mingzong's officials further suggested giving Emperor Ai a more proper (i.e., more Tang-traditional) posthumous name of Emperor Zhaoxuan Guanglie Xiao, with a temple name of Jingzong, but they also pointed out that since Emperor Ai's temple was not among the imperial ancestral temples, a temple name was not proper. Therefore, only the new posthumous name was adopted, and the temple name was not. Traditional histories thus referred to him mostly as Emperor Ai but also at times as Emperor Zhaoxuan.

== Chancellors during reign ==
- Cui Yuan (904–905)
- Pei Shu (904–905)
- Dugu Sun (904–905)
- Liu Can (904–905)
- Zhang Wenwei (905–907)
- Yang She (905–907)

== Family ==
No family recorded in official histories; Song dynasty general Li Gang was claimed to be a descendant through a son named Li Xizhao (李熙照)

Emperor Ai of Tang Tang dynasty Born: 892 Died: 908
Regnal titles
Preceded by Emperor Zhaozong	Emperor of Tang; 904–907	Succeeded by (none)
Preceded by Emperor Zhaozong	Emperor of China (most regions); 904–907	Succeeded by Zhu Wen
Preceded by Emperor Zhaozong	Emperor of China (Sichuan/Chongqing); 904–907	Succeeded by Wang Jian (Emperor of (Former) Shu)
Preceded by Emperor Zhaozong	Emperor of China (Shanxi); 904–907	Succeeded by Li Keyong (Prince of Jin)
Preceded by Emperor Zhaozong	Emperor of China (Jiangsu/Jiangxi/Anhui); 904–907	Succeeded by Yang Wo (Prince of Hongnong (Wu))
Preceded by Emperor Zhaozong	Emperor of China (Eastern Inner Mongolia); 904–907	Succeeded by Emperor Taizu of Liao
Preceded by Emperor Zhaozong	Emperor of China (Western Shaanxi); 904–907	Succeeded by Li Maozhen (Prince of Qi)
Preceded by Emperor Zhaozong	Emperor of China (Zhejiang); 904–907	Succeeded by Qian Liu (Prince of Wuyue)
